= Adolf Hoffmeister =

Czech writer and illustrator (1902–1973)

JUDr. Adolf Hoffmeister
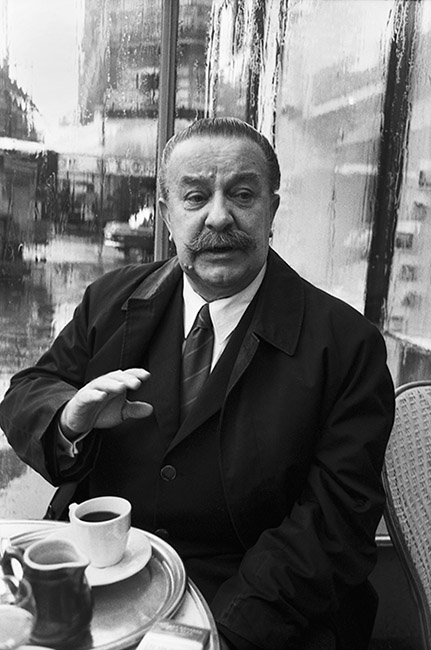
- Hoffmeister at Café les Deux Magots, Paris, 1969
- Born: 15 August 1902; Prague, Bohemia, Austria-Hungary
- Died: 24 July 1973 (aged 70); Říčky v Orlických horách, Czechoslovakia
- Education: Faculty of Law, Charles University
- Known for: illustration, caricatures, poetry, journalism, diplomacy, librettist, typographer, chairman of the Union of Czechoslovak Artists (1964–1968)
- Movement: Devětsil
- Spouses: Marie Prušáková–Honzíková, writer (1926–1930), Lilly Strich, actor (1946–1973)
- Children: Martin Hoffmeister, Adam Hoffmeister
- Parents: Adolf Hoffmeister (1870–1936) (father); Marie Schnöbling (1881–1967) (mother)
- Relatives: Karel Hoffmeister (pianist, uncle), Ferdinand Hoffmeister (philologist, uncle)
- Awards: Gold medal at the World Exhibition in Paris (1937), Legion of Honour (1946), Order of the Crown of Romania, Order of Polonia Restituta (1947), Chevalier de l'Ordre des Arts et Lettres (1958), Order of the Republic (Czechoslovakia) (1960), Meritorious Artist (Czechoslovakia) (1962)

Adolf Hoffmeister (15 August 1902 – 24 July 1973) was a Czech writer, playwright, painter, draughtsman, scenographer, cartoonist, translator, diplomat, lawyer, university professor and traveller. During the war, he served as editor of the radio station Voice of America, and after the war the Czechoslovak ambassador to France. In 1951 he became a professor at the Academy of Arts and Crafts in Prague. He was a founding member of Devětsil (1920), chairman of the Union of Czechoslovak Visual Artists (1964–1967, 1968–1969), and a member of International Association of Art Critics. Hoffmeister represented Czechoslovakia at UNESCO, the PEN Club and other international organizations. Hoffmeister's career was ended by the Warsaw Pact invasion of Czechoslovakia in August 1968 and the subsequent occupation.

== Life ==
=== Youth and studies ===
Adolf Hoffmeister was born in Prague, Bohemia, Austria-Hungary (now the Czech Republic) on 15 August 1902. He was born into the family of the Prague lawyer Adolf Hoffmeister (1870–1936) and his wife Marie, née Schnöbling (1881–1967). He grew up in a cultivated intellectual environment – his uncles were the composer and teacher Karel Hoffmeister and the classical philologist Ferdinand Hoffmeister. From 1914 the Hoffmeister family lived in the cubist house Diamant at the corner of Spálená Street No. 4, which was commissioned by Adolf Hoffmeister.

In 1912–1921 he studied at the Masaryk Ist State Czechoslovak Real Gymnasium in Křemencova Street in Prague, where most of the future members of the avant-garde group Devětsil met. When Devětsil was founded on 5 October 1920, Adolf Hoffmeister became its youngest member and its managing director. In 1919 he met the Čapek brothers and S. K. Neumann. After graduating from high school, he continued his studies at the Faculty of Law of Charles University in Prague, which he completed in 1925 with a doctorate (JUDr). In the summer semester of 1924 he studied Egyptology at Cambridge University. He joined his father's law firm as a law clerk, becoming one of three partners between 1930 and 1939. After Hitler came to power, this law firm represented a number of German exiles, including Thomas Mann.

From 1917 onwards, he wrote poems, which he initially published in magazines under various pseudonyms, and devoted himself to drawing and linocutting. In 1922, he published his first book of poems and prose, participated with seventeen works in the spring exhibition of the Devětsil, and in the same year made a trip to Paris. He became acquainted with Man Ray and Ossip Zadkine. He became a member of the New Group, which split from the Devětsil, and exhibited with it at the Mánes Hall in 1923. Members of the New Group were accepted into the Mánes Union of Fine Arts, but Hoffmeister stopped painting at that time and did not apply for admission. In the following period he devoted himself to caricatures, which he sent to Lidové noviny newspaper.

From autumn 1925 he became a core collaborator of the publishing house Aventinum and contributed cartoons, illustrations, articles about artists and interviews with important foreign authors to Rozpravy Aventina (Aventinum Talks).

=== 1926–1930 ===
After graduating in law, he travelled abroad regularly and worked as a correspondent for many magazines. In addition to information on cultural events, he also sent his own sketches of personalities he had met in person (G.B. Shaw, G. K. Chesterton, London 1926). In 1926 he published a novel, The Tropic of Capricornus, and a collection of poems, The Alphabet of Love. As editor of the magazine Pestrý týden he became close to the magazine's editor-in-chief, Staša Jílovská.

In 1926–1930 he was married to the prose writer and art theoretician Maria Prušáková (1903–2004, later remarried Honzíková, wife of the architect Karel Honzík).

In 1927 he had his first solo exhibition in the gallery of the publishing house Odeon. In April 1927, the poet Vladimir Mayakovsky stayed at his home during his visit to Prague. At Jiří Frejka's Dada Theatre, E.F. Burian presented a Voice-band programme with choral recitation of verses by several poets, including A. Hoffmeister. Together with Nezval, he accompanied the French poet Philippe Soupault and the publisher Léon Pierre-Quint around Prague. Miroslava Holzbachová performed Hoffmeister's ballet Park to music by Jaroslav Ježek at the Umělecká beseda. His merry play The Bride, directed by Jindřich Honzl, premiered at the Osvobozené divadlo. The photographer of the performance was Jaroslav Rössler. Hoffmeister began a permanent collaboration with Voskovec, Werich and Ježek, for whom he prepared programmes and posters and drew numerous cartoons. The Mánes Union of Fine Arts organised a large exhibition of Hoffmeister's drawing portraits and accepted him as a full member, and the publishing house Aventinum, for which he prepared an advertising campaign for the opening of the Aventinum Mansard sales gallery, published a book of his feuilletons illustrated with drawings. He also illustrated books by G. K. Chesterton for the publishing house L. Kuncíř.

In 1928–1930 he worked as an editor at Lidové noviny and in 1930–1932 at Literární noviny. He illustrated his own satirical page, Pestrý týden / The Colourful Week, for the magazine Kmen, which was directed by Julius Fučík. As a cover designer and illustrator, he collaborated with the publishing houses L. Kuncíř, V. Petr, A. Srdce, Odeon J. Fromka, Kvasnička and Hampl, Aventinum. He arranged with James Joyce the Czech edition of his Ulysses (V. Petr, 1930).

In 1928, he had his first solo exhibition in Paris (Visages par Adolf Hoffmeister) at the Galerie d'Art Contemporain and a reprise of this exhibition at the Galerie l'Epoque in Brussels. The success of this exhibition opened up the possibility of collaboration with the foreign press, especially with the newspaper L'Intransigeant. He became a member of the committee of the PEN Club in Prague.

From 1929 he was a member of the progressive organisation of Czech intellectuals, the Left Front. He exhibited 149 portraits in the Aventine Mansard (catalogue with introduction by Karel Teige, opening George Voskovec and Jan Werich) and prepared a series of Czech likenesses for Rozpravy, which was printed on the front page. He participated in an exhibition of caricatures in Louisville. He illustrated Gulliver's Travels, Eliška Junková's Auto-compass calendar and his own Calendar published by Aventinum (1930) and created covers for the Aventinum publishing house. He was one of the members of the Mánes Union of Fine Arts who left the association in protest against conservative trends (the so-called Secessionists of Mánes) and took part in a joint exhibition of secessionists in 1930. He opened Josef Šíma's exhibition in the Aventinum Mansard.

In 1930, the publisher Otakar Štorch-Marien sent him on a tour of Europe to make interviews with important figures of European culture and illustrate them with his caricatures. Hoffmeister met with Tristan Tzara, James Joyce, Le Corbusier, André Gide, Paul Valéry and George Grosz. After returning to Prague, he passed the bar exam and became a partner in the law firm of Hoffmeister Sr., Tonder, Hoffmeister Jr.

=== 1931–1939 ===
In 1931, the artists of the so-called Secession from Mánes returned to the Mánes union when they were offered full artistic freedom. Hoffmeister temporarily returned to painting and exhibited two paintings at the 162nd Mánes Members' Exhibition in the autumn. In the summer he travelled with Bedřich Feuerstein to the Soviet Union and met Luncharsky, Tatlin, Tairov, Piscator, Meyer, and on the way back to Leningrad also G. B. Shaw and A. Huxley. He published his experiences in the book The Surface of the Five-Year Plan. He proposed the set for the V. Dyk's play Forgetful at the National Theatre.

Hoffmeister's caricatured map of Europe was used on stage and in print in a new play Caesar by the Osvobozené divadlo (1932). Hoffmeister's critical comedy Singing Venice (published in book form by Melantrich, 1946) was staged at the Estates Theatre. Hoffmeister's reworking of Carlo Goldoni's play La bottega del café was successfully staged at the National Theatre and then in theatres throughout the country. He participated in an exhibition of surrealist art at the Mánes (Poetry 1932), and visited Egypt and Palestine.

In 1933, he exhibited 106 caricatures in České Budějovice (together with Antonín Pelc) and was elected to the committee of the Mánes union. Together with Nezval, he visited James Joyce in Paris and brought him his Czech translation of Anna Livia Plurabella. He was involved in replacing the editorial board and securing funding for the magazine Volné směry and as a lawyer in the drafting of the new statutes of Mánes union. He contributed to the play The World Behind Bars by the Osvobozené divadlo.

In 1934, he prepared an international exhibition of cartoons and humour at the Mánes union, which he himself took part in. The exhibited anti-fascist works of John Heartfield, who lived in Prague as a German exile, aroused the displeasure of the German ambassador Walter Koch, who demanded their removal. The building was attacked by right-wing students, and at the time the Mánes union eventually succumbed to police pressure, 60,000 people saw the exhibition thanks to the diplomatic scandal. In August, as a member of the delegation to the First Congress of Soviet Writers, Hoffmeister captured images of Gorkij, Pasternak, Babel, Bukharin, Bedny and Radek, which were then published by the magazines Ogoniok, Svět práce, Doba, exhibited at the Mánes Members' Exhibition and published as the album Images. At the end of the year he visited Spain, where the civil war was about to break out.

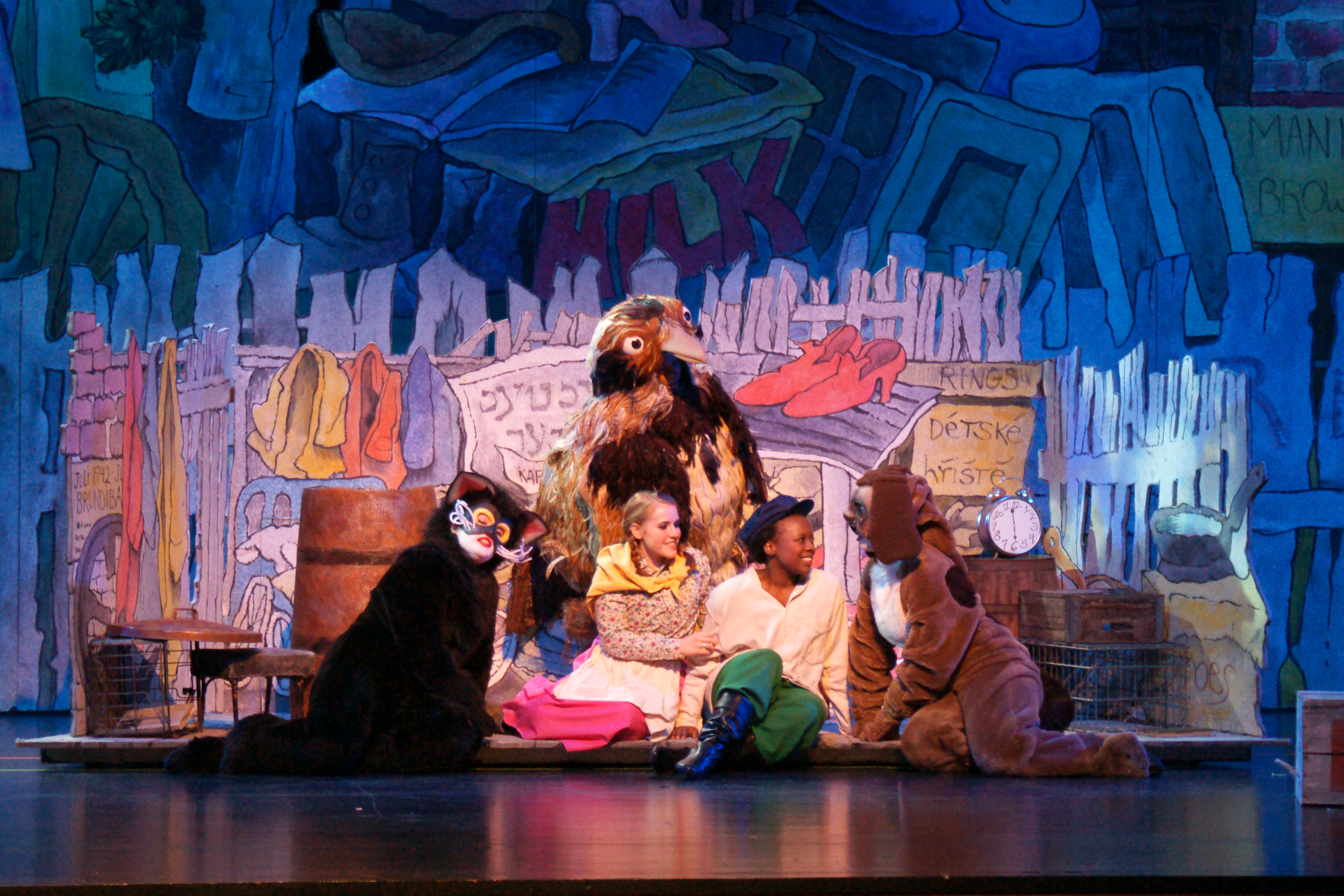
Brundibár, performed by Opera Theater of Pittsburgh in 2010

In 1935 he exhibited cartoons with the Mánes union in Ostrava, Bratislava and Košice, and with A. Plec in Benešov. He became a member of the anti-fascist Club of Czech-German Theatre Workers, where he became acquainted with a circle of Prague Germans and the composer Hans Krása, for whom he later wrote the libretto of the children's opera Brundibár (1938). In 1938, his comedy Youth in a Play with music by Hans Krása was staged by the Prague Kleine Bühne Theatre, directed by E.F. Burian, and the same year it was performed in German translation (Anna sagt nein). In the March issue of Teige's journal Doba he published a critical article Socialist realism on the need for creative freedom, and he also criticised the conditions in the USSR in a series of articles in Volné směry (1935–1936). In Prague he accompanied André Breton and Paul Éluard. He created an updated map of Europe for the stage of the Osvobozené divadlo performance Reverse and Obverse (1936).

After the death of his father in 1936, he became head of the law firm Hoffmeister, Tonder, Pacák. E. F. Burian´s Theatre D 36 presented the Matinee of Caricatures, a screening of caricatures by Hoffmeister, Bidlo, Pelc and Heartfield, accompanied by stage performances. In the fall, he traveled with arch. Jaroslav Fragner around the US and published the drawings and texts in the book American Swings. He became a member of the Committee for the Relief of Democratic Spain.

In 1937, he participated in the jubilee exhibition of the Mánes union on the occasion of the 50th anniversary of its foundation and lectured on art at an Mánes union event and at the Exhibition of the Czechoslovak Avant-Garde at the House of Art Industry in Prague (Národní 38). Together with A. Pelc, he exhibited caricatures at an exhibition at the House of Art in Ostrava. The fascists in the leadership of the gallery tried unsuccessfully to have the drawings of Hitler and Mussolini removed, and the scandal was widely reported in the press. He led the Mánes union tour to the Soviet Union. Soviet censorship excluded the works of many artists, including Hoffmeister, from an exhibition of Czechoslovak art in Moscow. Further censorship crackdowns also affected the Today's Mánes exhibition in Prague, and Emil Filla suggested that Mánes union members create special works for the Artists Accuse exhibition.

Adolf Hoffmeister was awarded a Gold medal at the World Exhibition in Paris.

In January 1938, with an article in Tvorba entitled "NO!", he defined himself against S.K. Neumann's earlier attack and defended the artist's right to freedom not subject to the dictates of socialist realism. He participated in the Mánes union member exhibition Black and White. The writers' community delegated him to anti-fascist writers' meetings in Paris and London to defend Czechoslovak interests against W. Runciman's plans to annex the Sudetenland to the Third Reich. Throughout the year he was involved in anti-fascist activities – in Paris he had an exhibition of anti-fascist cartoons at the Maison de la Culture, which was introduced by Louis Aragon, and he proposed a fund-raising campaign among the members of the Mánes union. He participated in the PEN Club congress in Prague and in the activities of the Association of Czechoslovak Writers.

In early 1939, his cartoons were exhibited in the Topič Salon at the posthumous exhibition of Karel Čapek and at an exhibition of likenesses of Mánes union members.

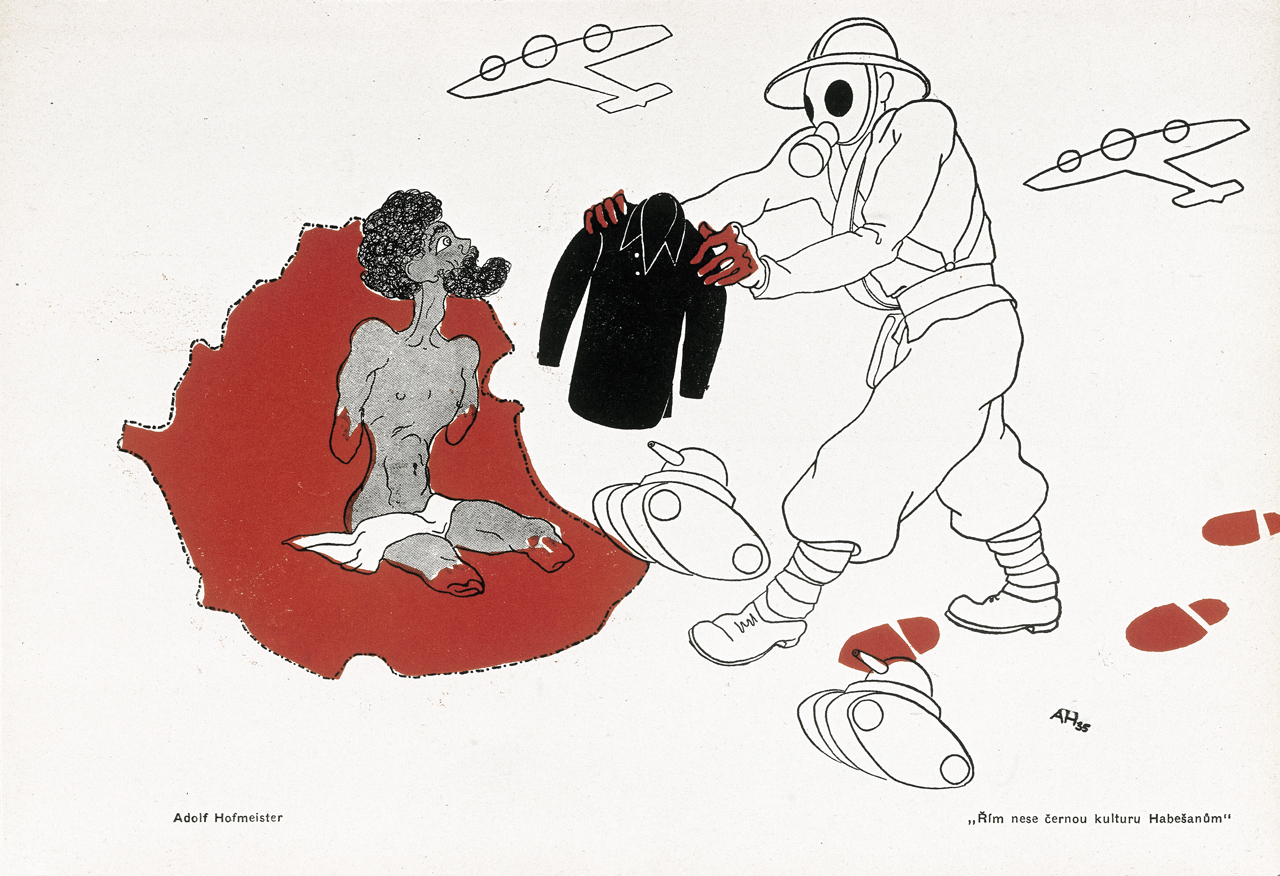
Adolf Hoffmeister, Rome brings black culture to the Abyssinians, 1936

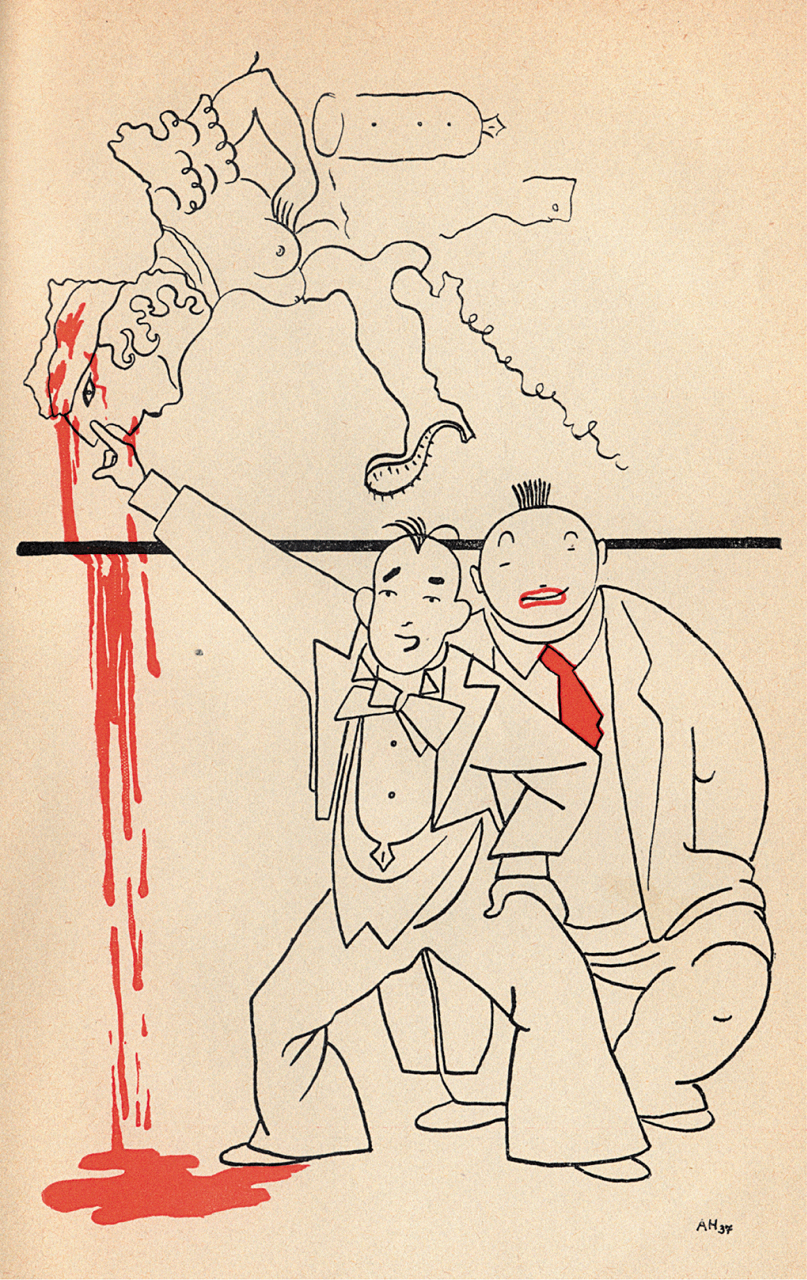
Adolf Hoffmeister, I love the Spanish country so much, 1936 (Voskovec and Werich)

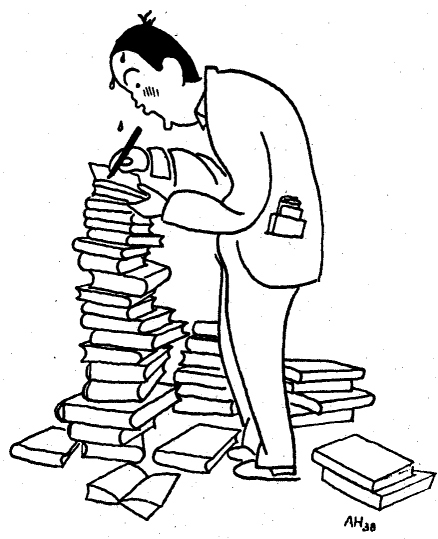
Adolf Hoffmeister, Karel Čapek, 1938

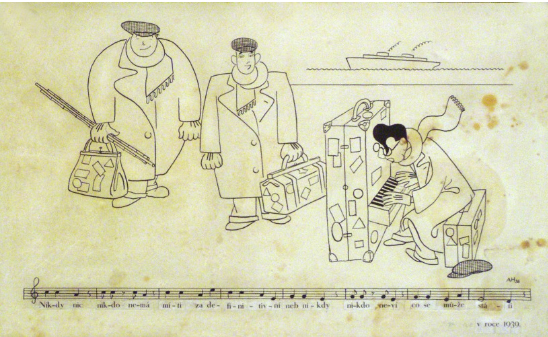
New Year's card for Voskovec, Werich and Ježek for 1939, (1938)

=== Emigration ===
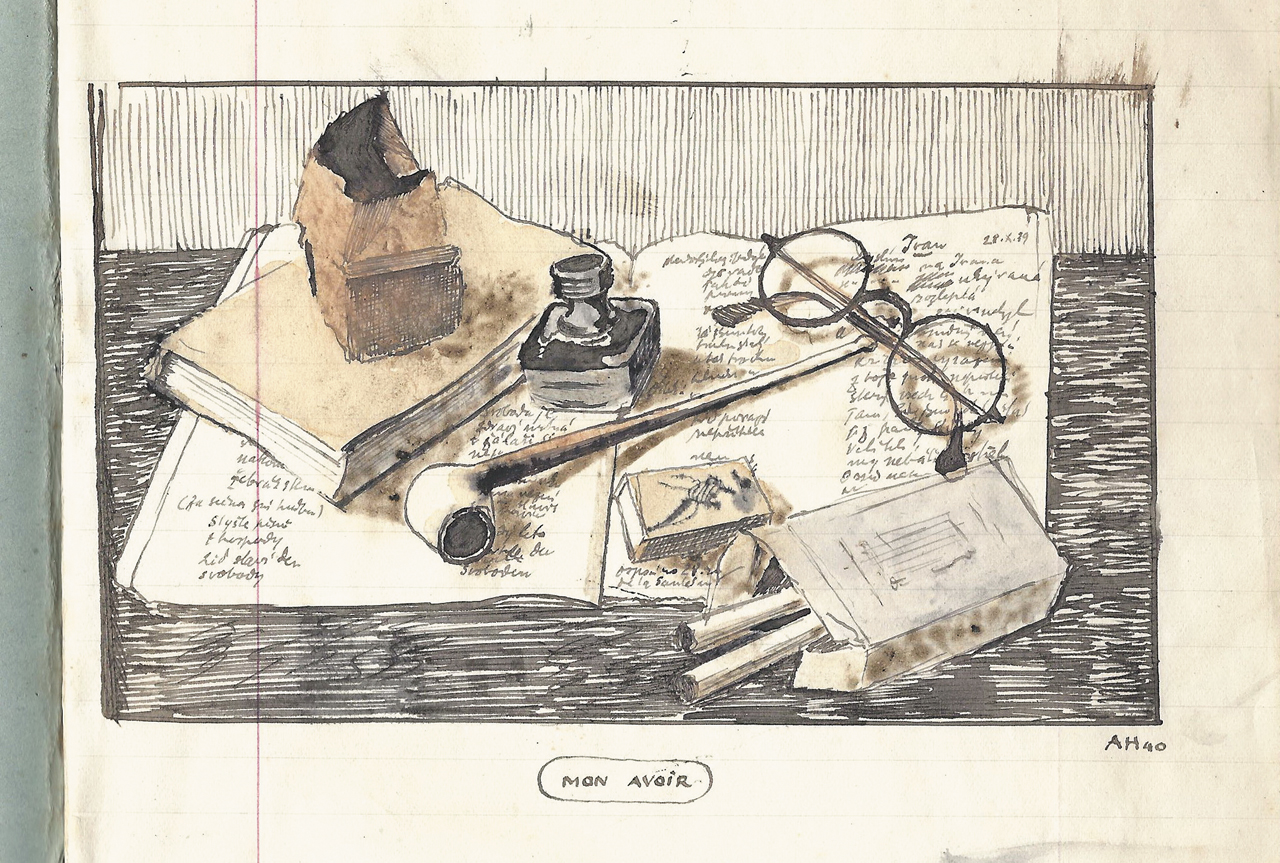
Adolf Hoffmeister, Mon Avoir, drawing from La Santé Prison, coloured with chocolate, tobacco, wall dirt and ink, 9 x 15 cm, 1940

Two days after the occupation of Czechoslovakia by German troops and the declaration of the Protectorate, he received an invitation to France on 18 March 1939, arranged by Aragon. He was granted an extraordinary French visa and fled to Paris on 23 April. There he made contacts with resistance organisations and, with the help of French communists, founded the Maison de la Culture Tchécoslovaque. In September 1939, after the occupation of eastern Poland by Soviet troops, he was arrested on the basis of an anonymous denunciation and accused, along with many other Czechoslovak citizens (Pelc, Diviš, Reinerová, Kopf, etc.), as an agent of Moscow. He was imprisoned for seven months in solitary confinement in La Santé Prison. There he wrote a puppet play, The Tramp or King Famine, for his nieces and nephews, which was brought out of prison by his lawyer.

In 1940, a military tribunal acquitted him of anti-French activities, but he continued to be interned in the concentration camps of Roland Garros (Paris), Damigny (Normandy) and Bassens (Bordeaux). On the day of the French surrender, he escaped to Casablanca but was again interned. On the guarantee of his compatriots living in Morocco, he was released and went by boat to Tangier, where he was again interned for a week and finally reached Lisbon with a cargo ship.

In January 1941, with the help of Jan Werich and George Voskovec, he sailed to New York City via Havana. In the United States, he stayed first with J. Ježek and J. Werich and then, in return for a fee for his drawings of factory workers, he went with Voskovec and Werich to Hollywood, where he translated the account of his anabasis into English. A book accompanied by drawings was published in 1941 in New York City as The Animals are in Cages and in London as Unwilling Tourist (1946).

He returned to New York City in 1942 and began contributing to the newspapers. He printed articles and drawings in The Nation, Zítřek (New York) and Obzor (London). On behalf of the International Workers Order (IWO), he lectured at expatriate centers throughout the United States, and then was invited by the U.S. Office of War Information to serve as a broadcaster and editor for the Voice of America. He also hosted the Voskovec and Werich programs (as Prof. Peony). In New York City, he participated in an exhibition of Czechoslovak art and published a play, The Blind Man's Whistle or Lidice, which was performed the following year by the IWO Committee in New York City, directed by Voskovec, and in Polish translation by Polski Dom Narodowy NY. Lilly Strich, whom he had known from the pre-war Prague German Theatre, came to him from London exile.

In 1943, he participated in the Art in Exile exhibition at the New York Public Library and, together with Antonín Plec, had an exhibition of political cartoons at the Museum of Modern Art, which was opened by Edvard Beneš. The collection of cartoons then travelled to other cities in the USA and Canada until 1944. Another exhibition, Cartoons by Hoffmeister, Pelc, Trier, Stephen and Z.K., opened in London and toured English cities the following year. In 1944, the cartoons were published in book form as Jesters in Earnest in London. The Sunday edition of The New York Times Magazine printed Hoffmeister's drawings Anti-Axis Algebra, the cartoons of Hitler The Prisoner of Stalingrad, The Leader, and the allegory of the Tehran Conference.

From March 1944, Hoffmeister headed the Czechoslovak section of the Voice of America.

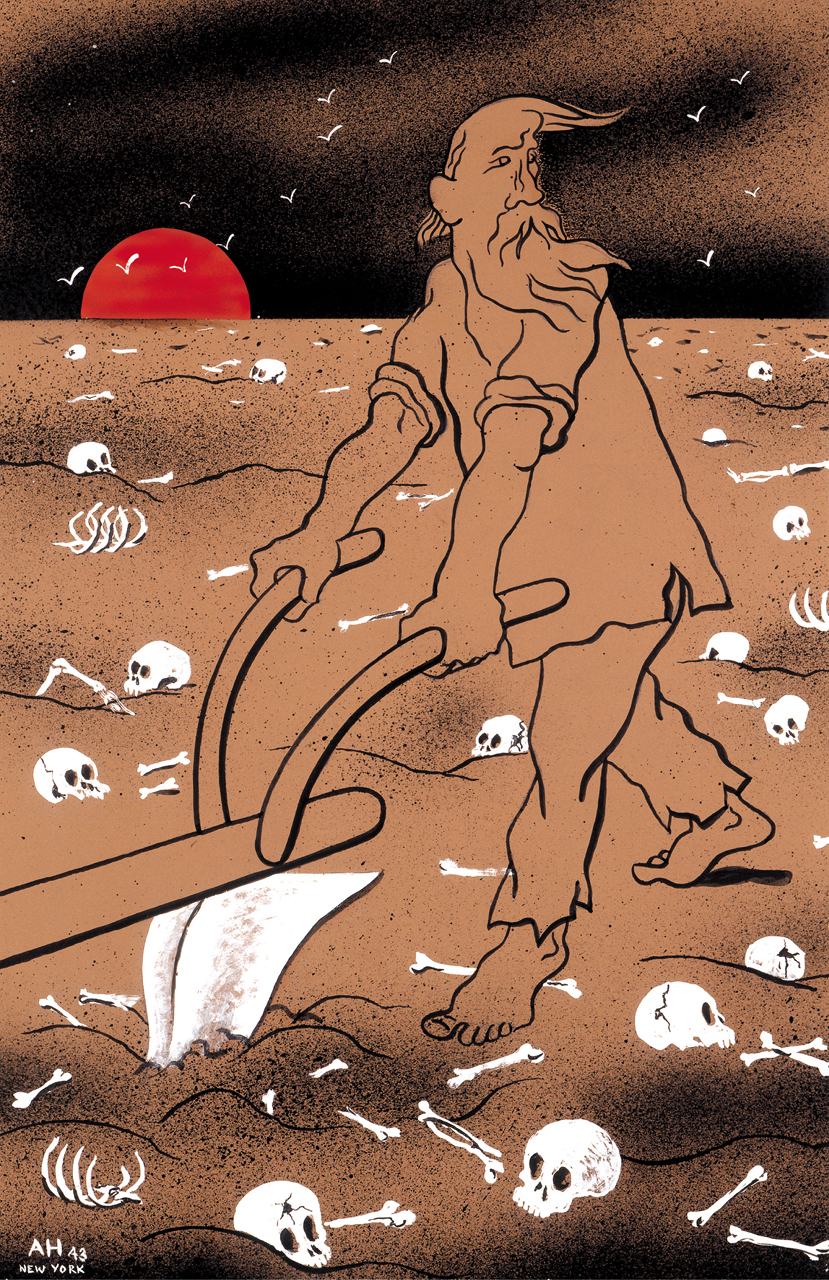
Adolf Hoffmeister, Ukraine, 1943

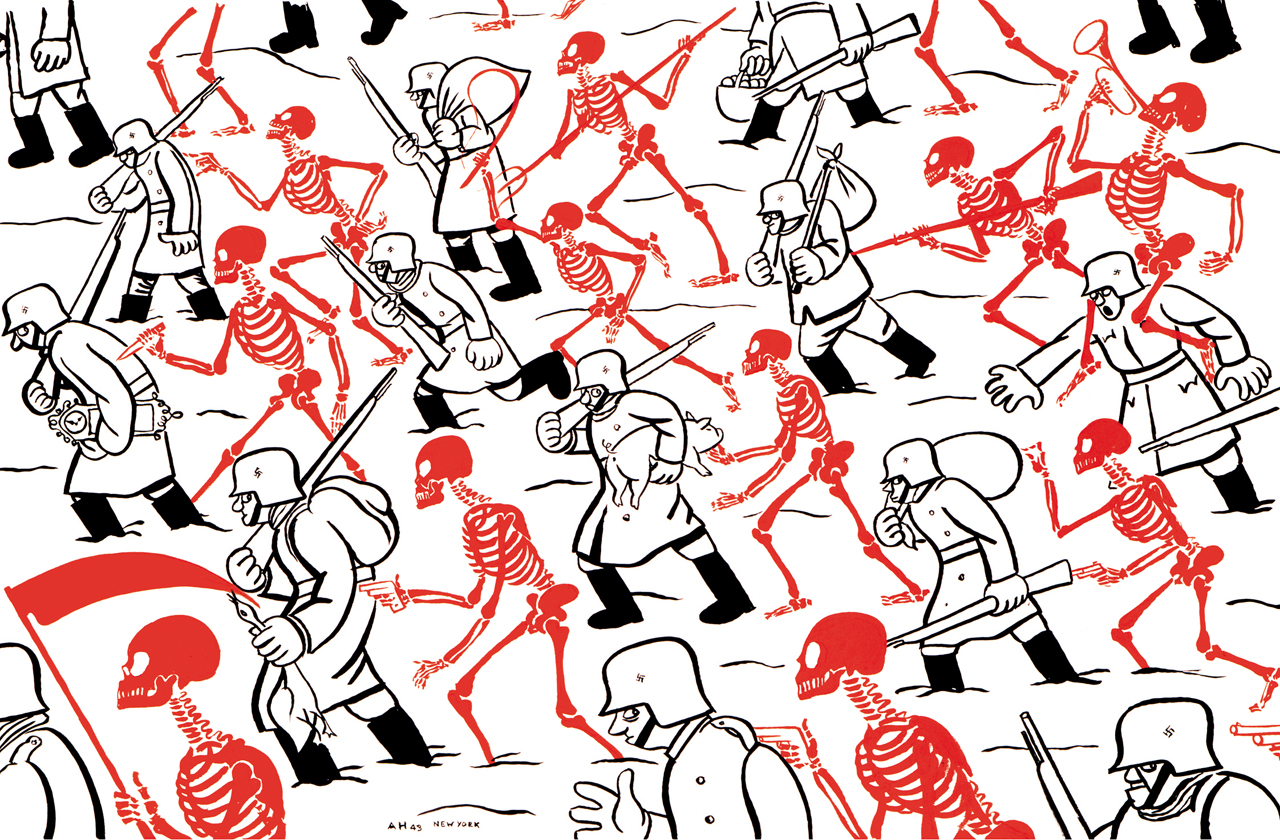
Adolf Hoffmeister, Tapestrier´s Wallpaper, 1943

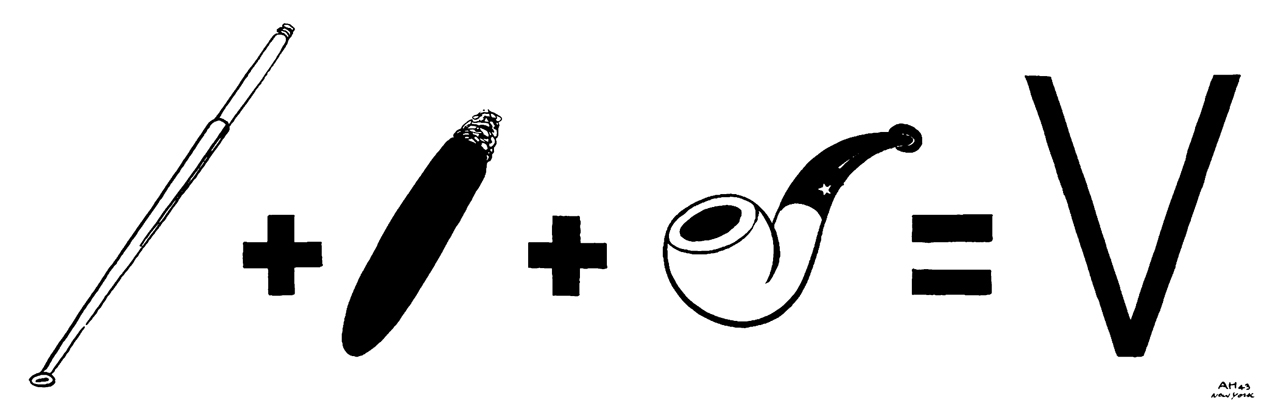
Adolf Hoffmeister, Teheran Conference, 1943

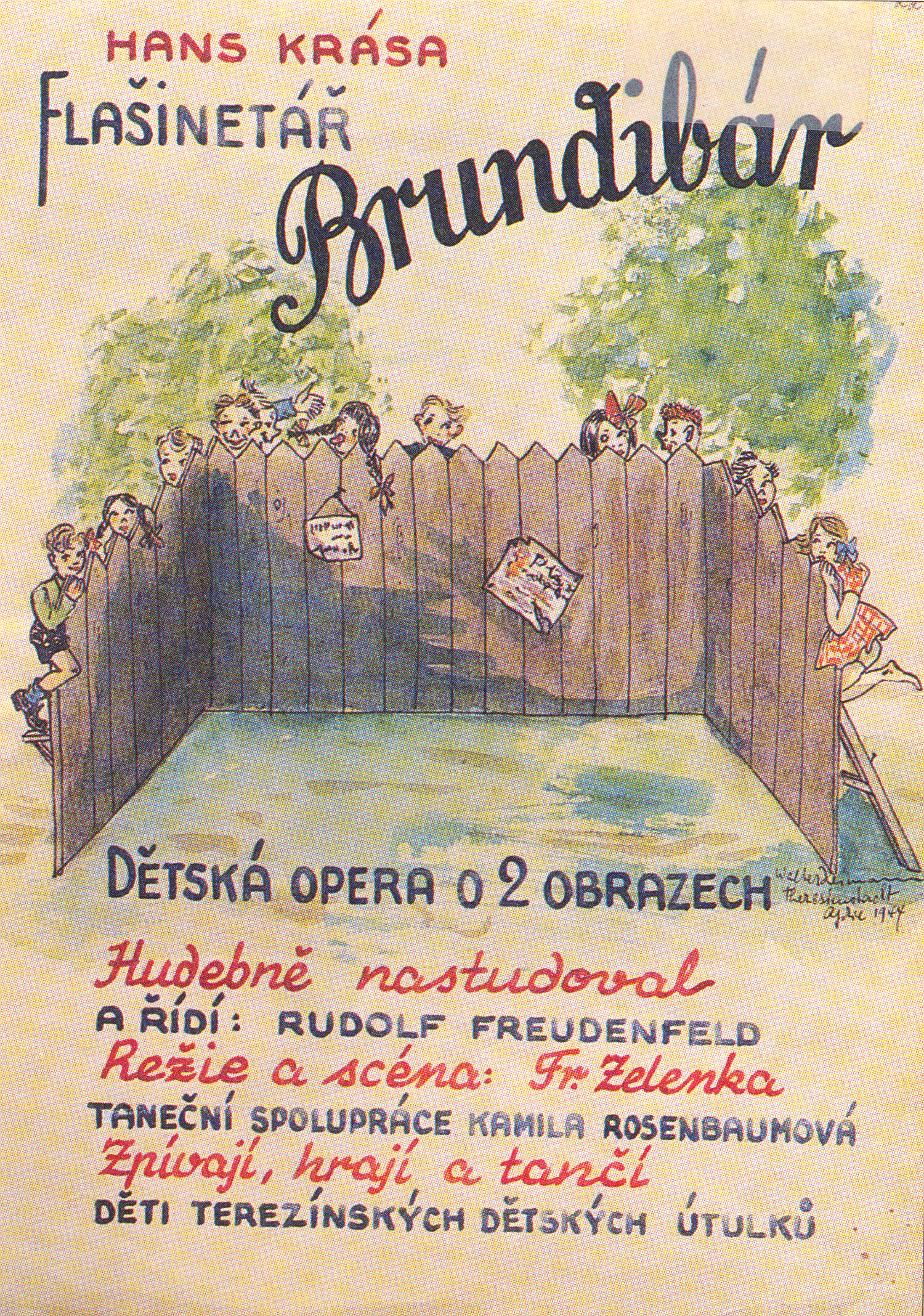
Adolf Hoffmeister, Hans Krása - Brundibár opera, Poster by František Zelenka (1943)

=== 1945–1959 ===
In June 1945 he was invited by the Minister of Culture Václav Kopecký to return to Czechoslovakia. Hoffmeister joined the Communist Party of Czechoslovakia (KSČ) and in November 1945 became head of the VI Department of the Ministry of Information and Education, where he was put in charge of foreign cultural relations. He served in this position until March 1948.

In 1946, he married Lilly Strich, who had lived with him in the US during the war. From his marriage he had sons Martin David (director, * 1947) and Adam (artist, * 1953). He bought a cottage in Říčky v Orlických horách, where he often worked and rested until the end of his life. At the Mánes union exhibition, he exhibited a drawing of J. Stalin entitled "Even if the ravens would wrap themselves in peacock feathers, they would not cease to be ravens". As a member of the Czechoslovak delegation he participated in the First General Assembly of UNESCO and took part in the preparation of the exhibition Art tchécoslovaque 1938–1946 in Paris. The French government awarded him the Order of the Legion of Honour.

The following year he was a member of the delegation to the Second General Assembly of UNESCO in Mexico and then travelled with Norbert Frýd through Mexico and met Diego Rivera, Frida Kahlo and J. C. Orozco. He was appointed Commander of the Order of the Crown of Romania and Commander of the Order of Polonia Restituta.

In February 1948, he became chairman of the action committee of the Union of Czechoslovak Artists. In March, he led the Czechoslovak delegation to the International Conference on Freedom of Information in Geneva. From the Foreign Ministry he was offered to join the diplomatic service and in June he was appointed Czechoslovak ambassador in Paris. He worked with Josef Šíma, who served as an advisor on Czechoslovak-French cultural relations from 1945 to 1950. He became Czechoslovakia's permanent delegate to UNESCO and deputy head of the Czechoslovak delegation to the Third and Fourth General Assembly of the United Nations in New York City (1948, 1949).

In the second half of 1950, he spent three months in New York City as a delegate to the Fifth General Assembly of the United Nations and described the proceedings together with Miroslav Galuska in a strongly ideologically oriented report, which he illustrated with cartoons. He was the candidate of Czechoslovakia and other socialist countries for the UN Security Council.

In 1951 he was dismissed from his post as ambassador and was not allowed to return to Paris. He was appointed professor of the Cartoon and Puppet Studio at the Academy of Arts and Crafts in Prague. Pablo Neruda and David Afaro visited him in Prague. In January 1952, Lidové noviny published his article "Critique of art criticism" against the dogmatic interpretation of socialist realism and in defence of Czech modern art.

In 1953, he participated in the preparation of the exhibition of Jean Effel in the Mánes union and the publication of his book of political drawings. At the end of the year he took part in a trip of cultural workers to China and Mongolia and visited Chinese painters (Qi Baishi, Jie Chengyu, Li Keran) and then took a "friendship train" trip around China. From this trip came the travelogue Postcards from China, a book on Chinese Kuohua art, and drawings that he exhibited the following year at the Book Gallery.

In 1955 he was sent to Beijing and Shanghai as a commissioner for the cultural part of the exhibition Ten Years of Building Czechoslovakia and included his experiences in the 2nd edition of Postcards from China. In his book One Hundred Years of Czech Caricature, he was the first art historian to elaborate the history of this genre. He published a monograph on the inventor of the intaglio press, Karel Klíč. He accompanied Tristan Tzara and Fernand Léger during their visit to Czechoslovakia.

At the beginning of 1956 he visited Jean Effel and Louis Aragon in Paris, and on his return to Prague he met Diego Rivera, who was returning from the Soviet Union. In May he was a member of the first Czechoslovak cultural delegation to Egypt, which included egyptologists František Lexa and Zbyněk Žába. He published a report from his stay under the title A View from the Pyramids (1957). He attended the 6th Assembly of the European Committee for Culture in Venice and became a member of the Bureau of the Czechoslovak National Commission for Cooperation with UNESCO. In December he visited India with a Czechoslovak cultural delegation.

In 1957 he participated in the meetings of the UNESCO Friends Clubs in Paris and Chamonix and in June he was the general commissioner of the representative exhibition of Czech medieval art, L'art ancien en Tchécoslovaquie, at the Musée des arts décoratifs in Paris. In September he was a delegate of Czechoslovakia at the 29th International Congress of PEN Clubs in Tokyo and then travelled around Japan (an illustrated book Made in Japan was published in 1958). In Japan he met John Steinbeck, Alberto Moravia and John Dos Passos.

He wrote the commentary and lyrics for Jean Effel's feature film The Creation of the World, which was made in Prague and premiered in 1958. In May, he met with Polish artists and intellectuals in Warsaw and then attended a meeting of the All-Union Association of Visual Artists (VSVU) in Moscow and signed a cultural agreement between the VSVU and the Czechoslovak Union of Visual Artists. He met with Lilya Brik, Leonid Martynov, Ilya Ehrenburg and visited Konstantin Fedin, Chairman of the Russian-German Friendship Union (USSR-GDR), and Boris Pasternak in Peredelkino.

He participated in the conception of the Czechoslovak pavilion at Expo 58 in Brussels and served as a member of the international jury. On behalf of Czechoslovakia, he participated in the preparation of documents for the Congress for Disarmament and Cooperation of Nations, held in Stockholm in July 1958, as well as in the editing of the final documents of the Congress. He was a delegate to the UNESCO General Conference in Paris and a candidate for the Executive Board. The French government awarded him the Chevalier de l'Ordre des Arts et Lettres.

The Czechoslovak Writer publishing house began publishing The Selection from the Works of Adolf Hoffmeister. He edited the commemorative anthology Café Union, published by the Publishing House of Czechoslovak Artists.

In 1959 he organised an exhibition of Jiří Trnka at the Musée des arts décoratifs in Paris and created the script for the exhibition Czechoslovakia 1960 in Prague. He wrote the preface to the edition of Effel's Creation of the World-Creation of Man (SNKLHU, 1959) and illustrated Verne's book Around the World in Eighty Days (Czech 1959, English 1965) with collages. Hoffmeister's illustrations and cartoons were exhibited in Bratislava and Warsaw.

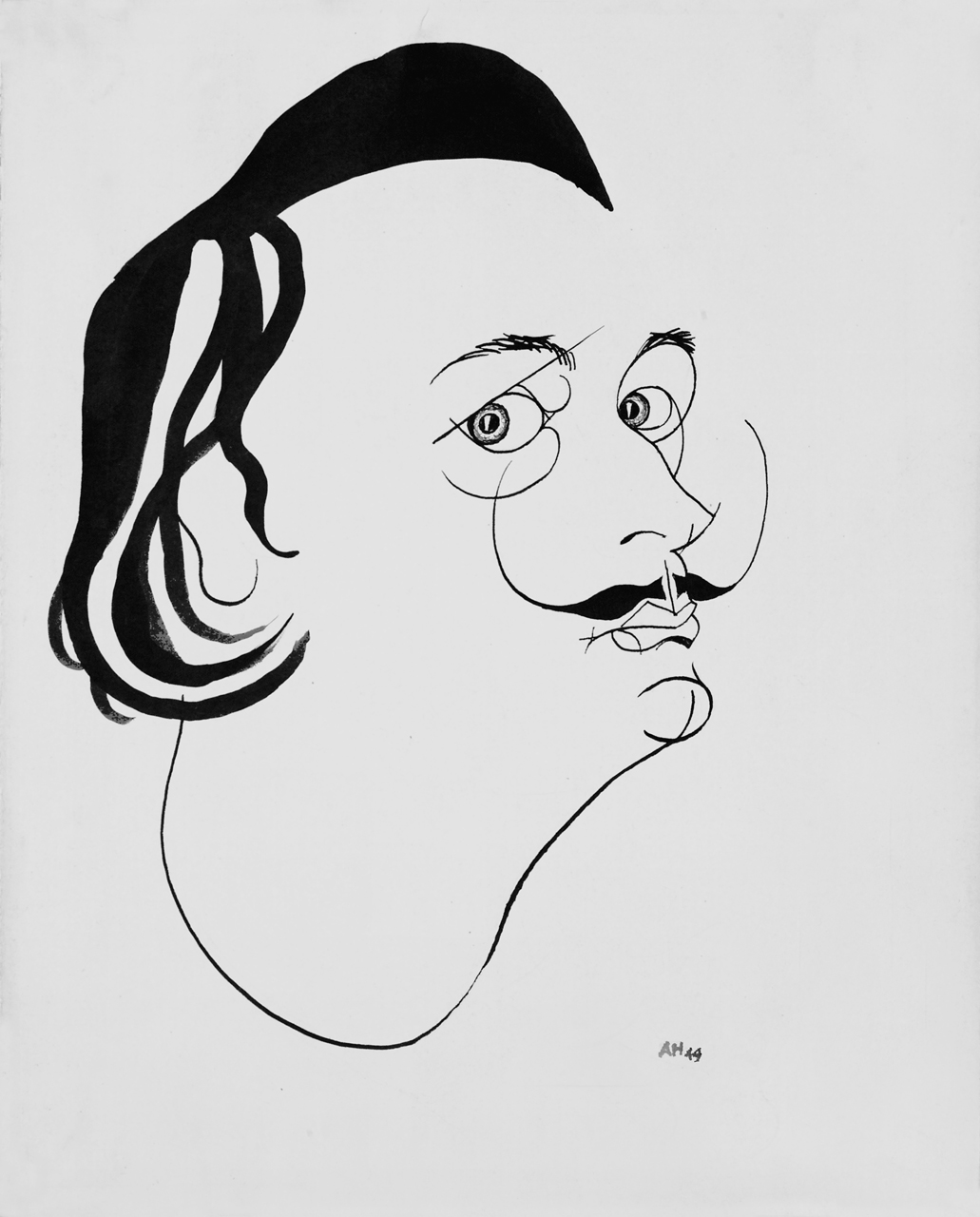
Adolf Hoffmeister, Antennas of the Genius - Salvador Dalí, 1949

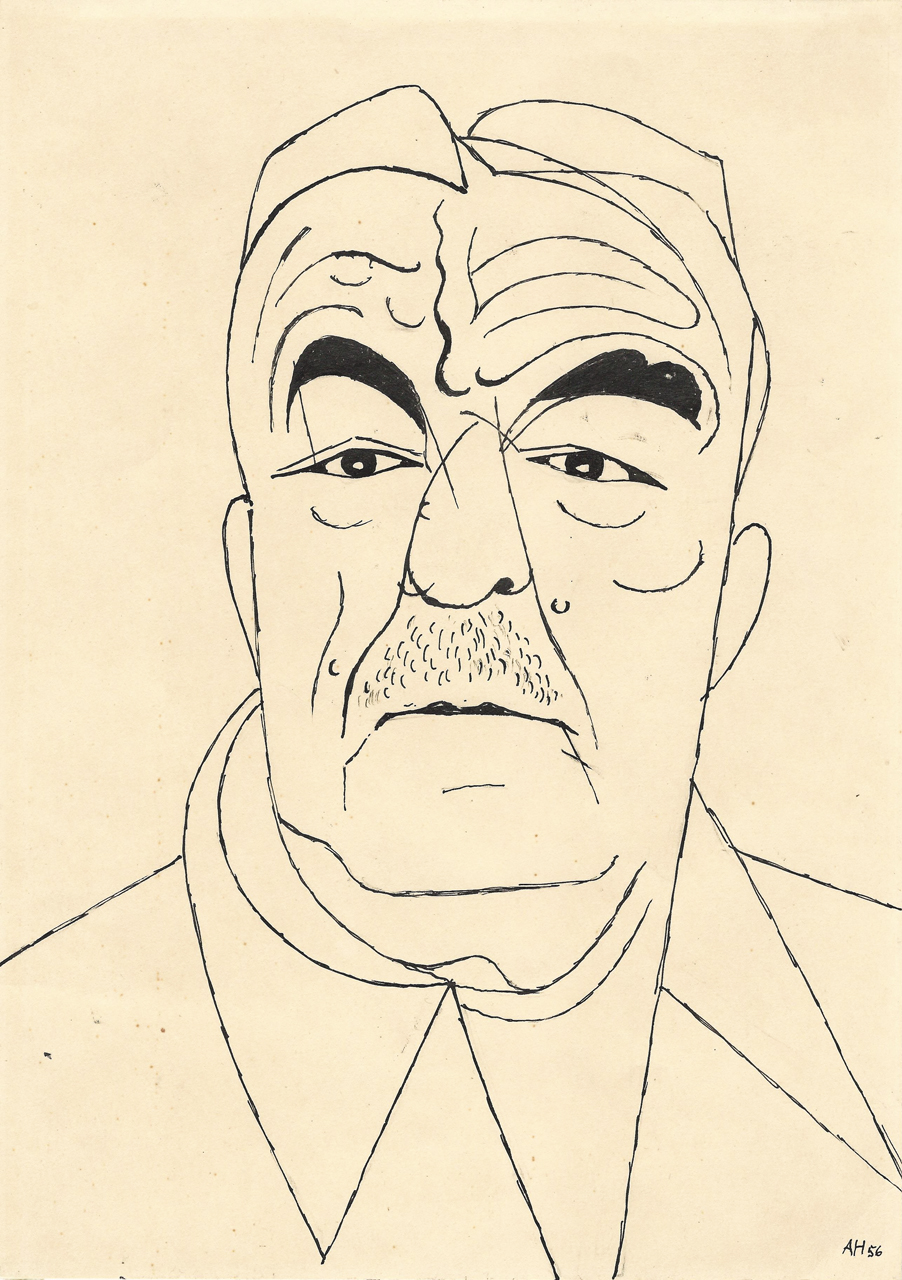
Adolf Hoffmeister, Fernand Léger, 1956

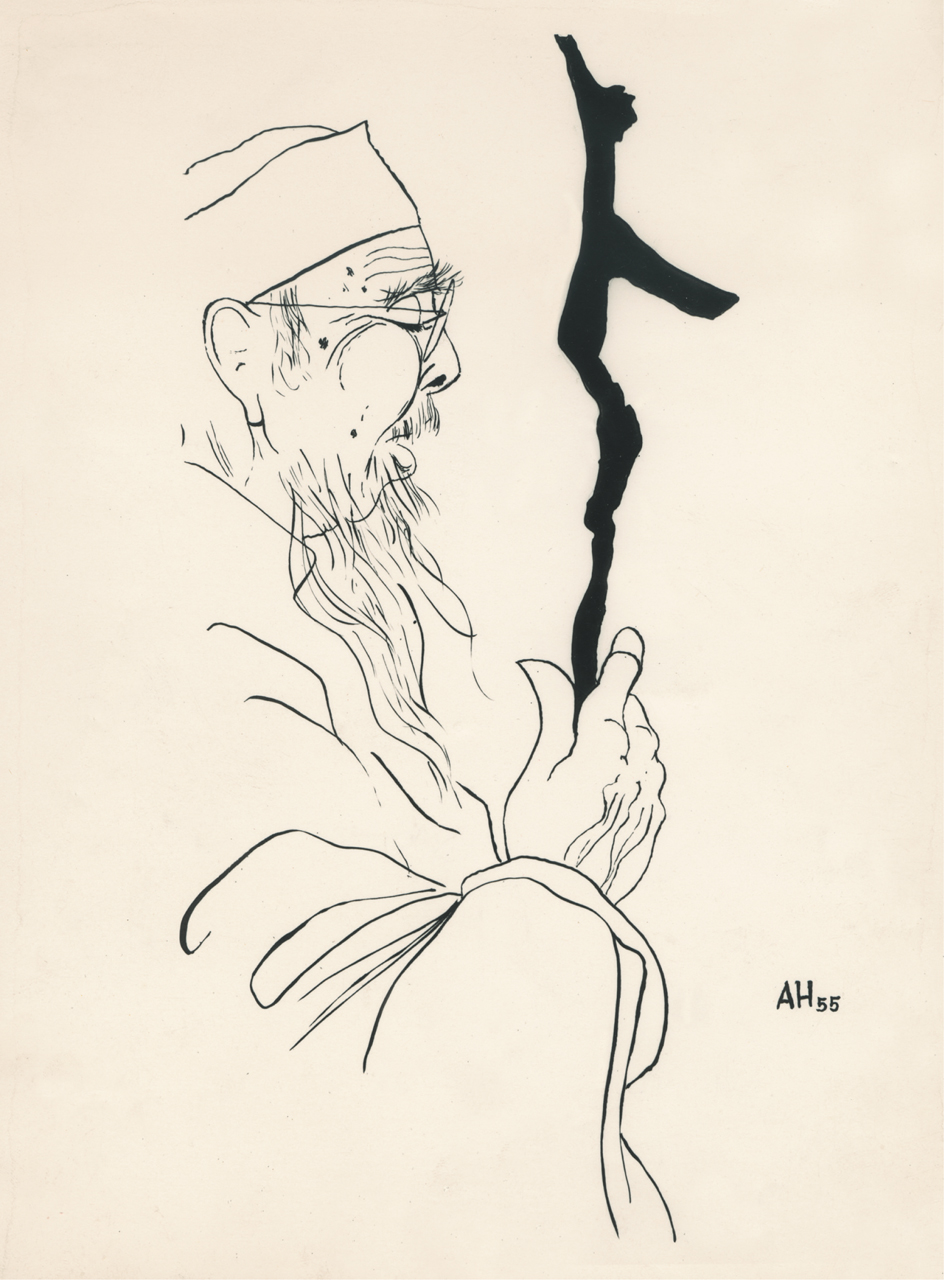
Adolf Hoffmeister, Qi Baishi, 1955

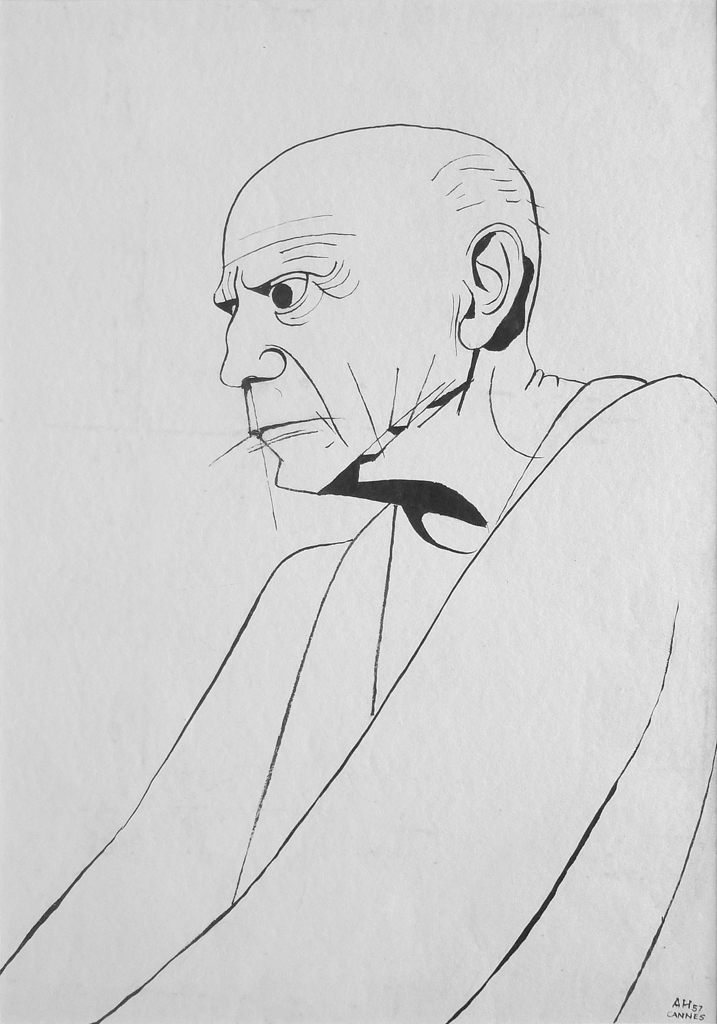
Adolf Hoffmeister, Picasso, Cannes 1957

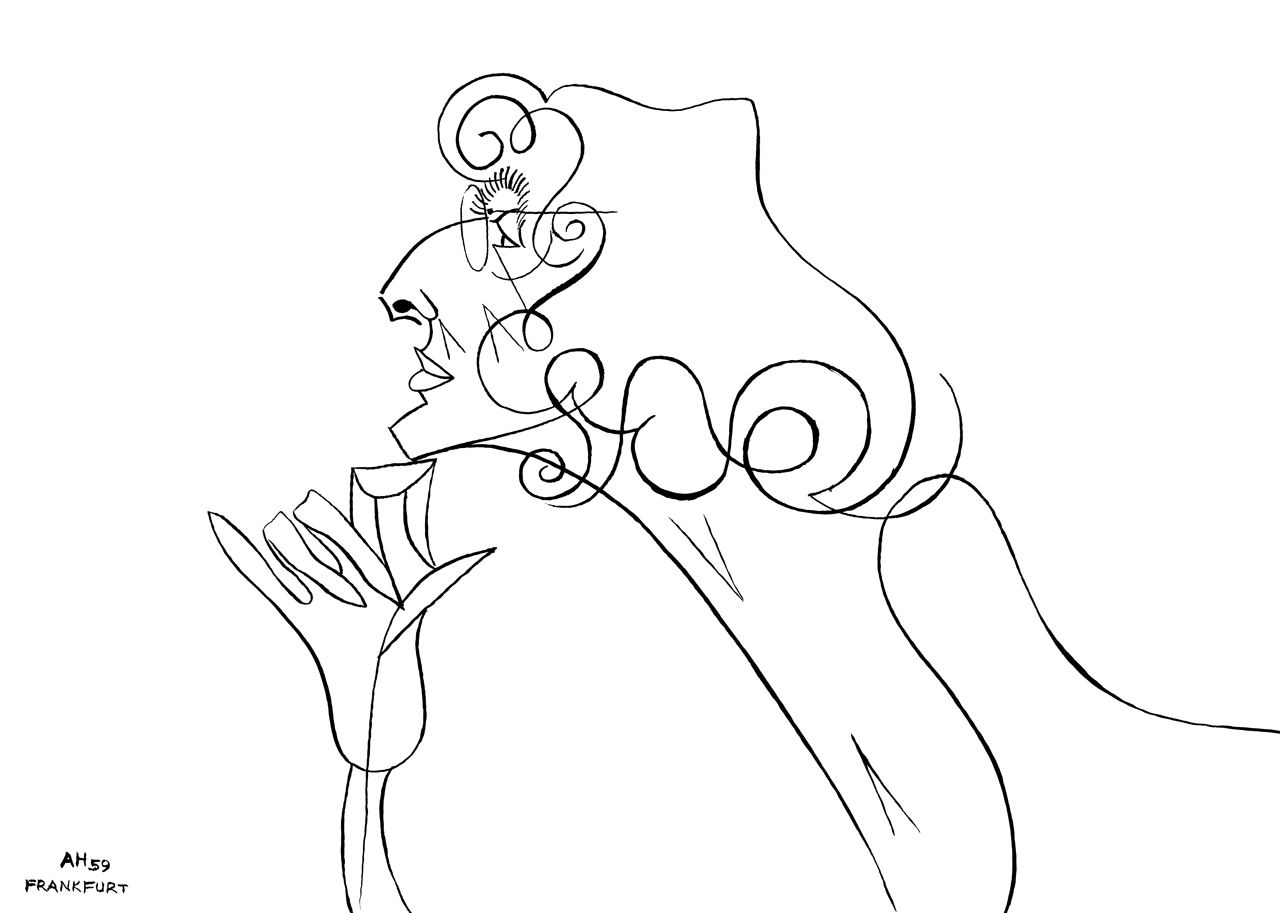
Adolf Hoffmeister, Claire Goll, 1959

=== 1960–1963 ===
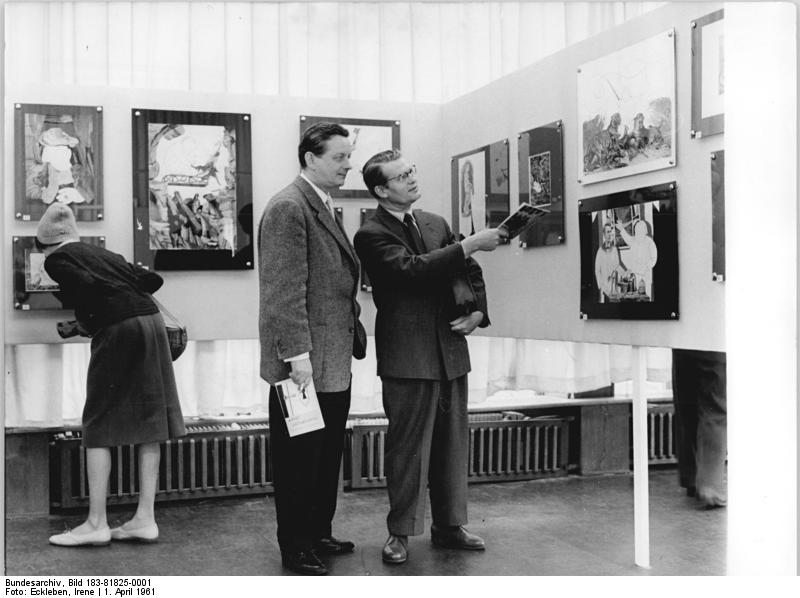
Hoffmeister's exhibition in Berlin (1961)

On 1 May 1960 Adolf Hoffmeister was awarded the Order of the Republic. He was involved in the cause of the imprisoned Laco Novomeský, who was granted amnesty in 1960. As a member of the Central Committee of the Union of Czechoslovak Visual Artists (1960–1964), he participated in the revival of art associations and attended the first exhibition of the Mánes creative group. In November 1960 he exhibited cartoons and illustrations at the Václav Špála Gallery. He was a Czechoslovak delegate to the Conference of European Commissions of UNESCO in Turin, to the 11th General Conference of UNESCO and in 1961 to the UNESCO meeting in Paris.

In 1961 he exhibited in Litoměřice, Hradec Králové, East Berlin, Paris, the following year in Ostrava and Pardubice.

At a solo exhibition at the Brno House of Art (1962) he exhibited 788 works. In 1962, thanks to his efforts, the Spring 1962 exhibition was held at Mánes, where the new Block of Creative Groups was also presented, bringing together independent and opposition artists. In April, as a member of a government delegation, he took part in a tour of Central and South America (Brazil, Chile, Bolivia, Mexico, Cuba). He met the poet Nicolás Guillén, Jorge Amado, Che Guevara and Fidel Castro, and used the illustrations he made during the trip for his book Skyscrapers in the Rainforest (1964).

On his sixtieth birthday in 1962, he received the title of Meritorious Artist. For the 4th volume of his collected works, Pre-Pictures, he wrote a preface on the founding of Devětsil and the artistic avant-garde of the time. Further reminiscences of Devětsil were then published in Literarni noviny. He organized and presented a collection of Western science fiction stories called Labyrint (SNKLU) with his own collages and illustrations by artists such as Jiří Balcar, Mikuláš Medek and Josef Istler. The State Pedagogical Publishing House published the Calculus for the 3rd year of primary school with his drawings and collages. A solo exhibition of Hoffmeister's cartoons, collages and illustrations was held in Moscow in October 1962 (presented by Boris Yefimov, Nâzım Hikmet). At the end of the year, he attended the UNESCO meeting in Paris.

In 1963, a retrospective exhibition AH 17–63 was held at the Mánes, which brought together 890 works by Adolf Hoffmeister and was accompanied by a catalogue with a text by Miroslav Lamač. The exhibition was introduced by a poem by Miroslav Holub and Jean-Paul Sartre attended as guest of honour. He also exhibited in West Berlin-Charlottenburg and at the Rychnov 1963 exhibition.

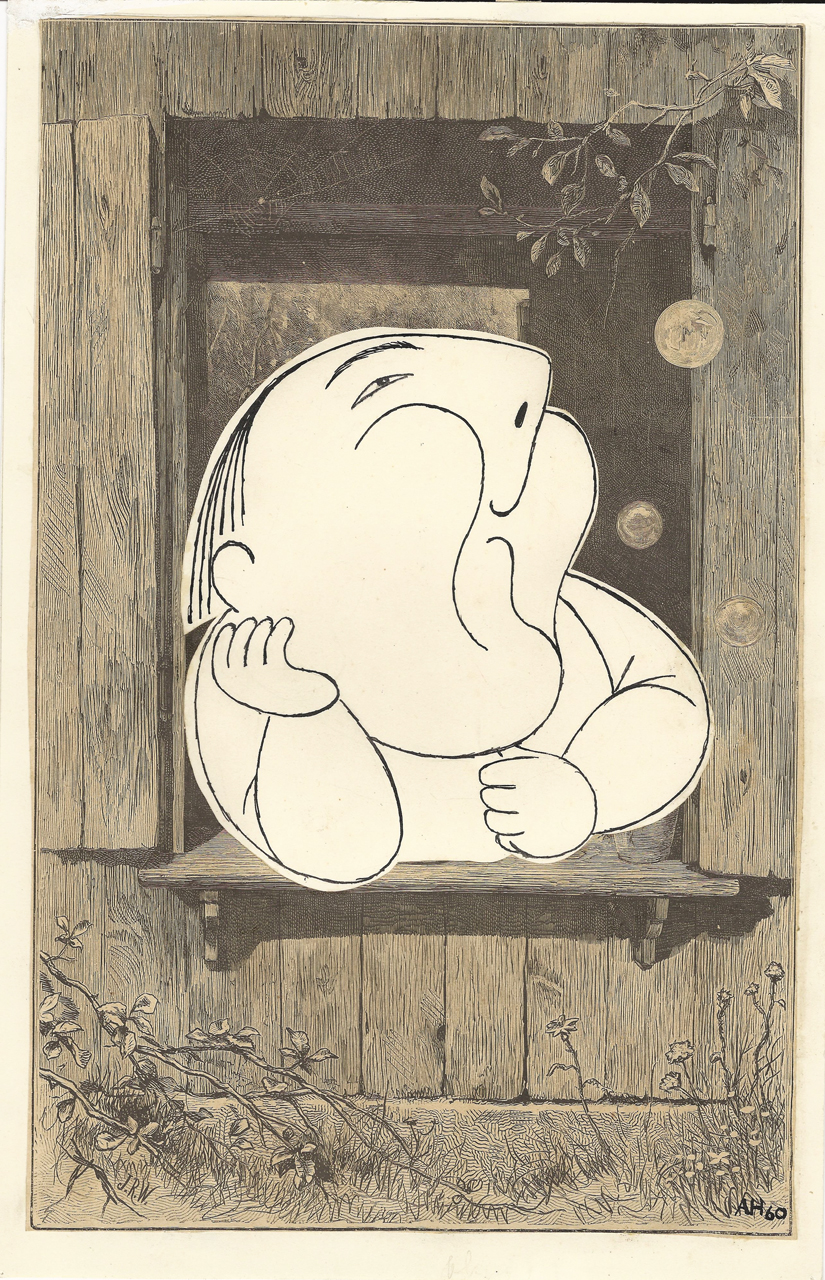
Adolf Hoffmeister, Nezvaliad - Nezval in the Window, 1960

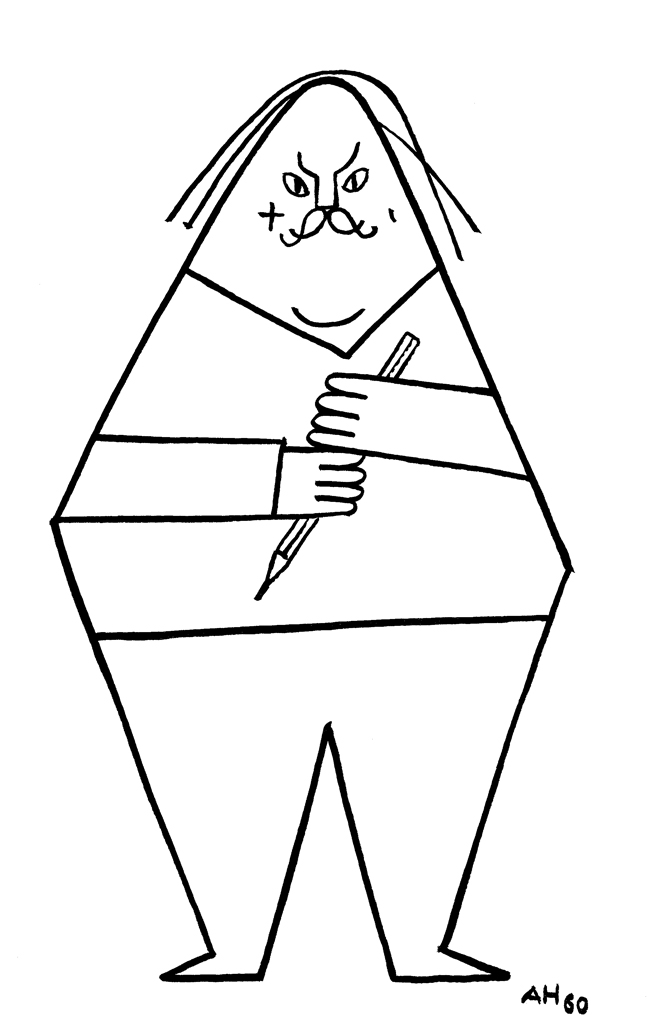
Adolf Hoffmeister, Jiří Trnka, 1960

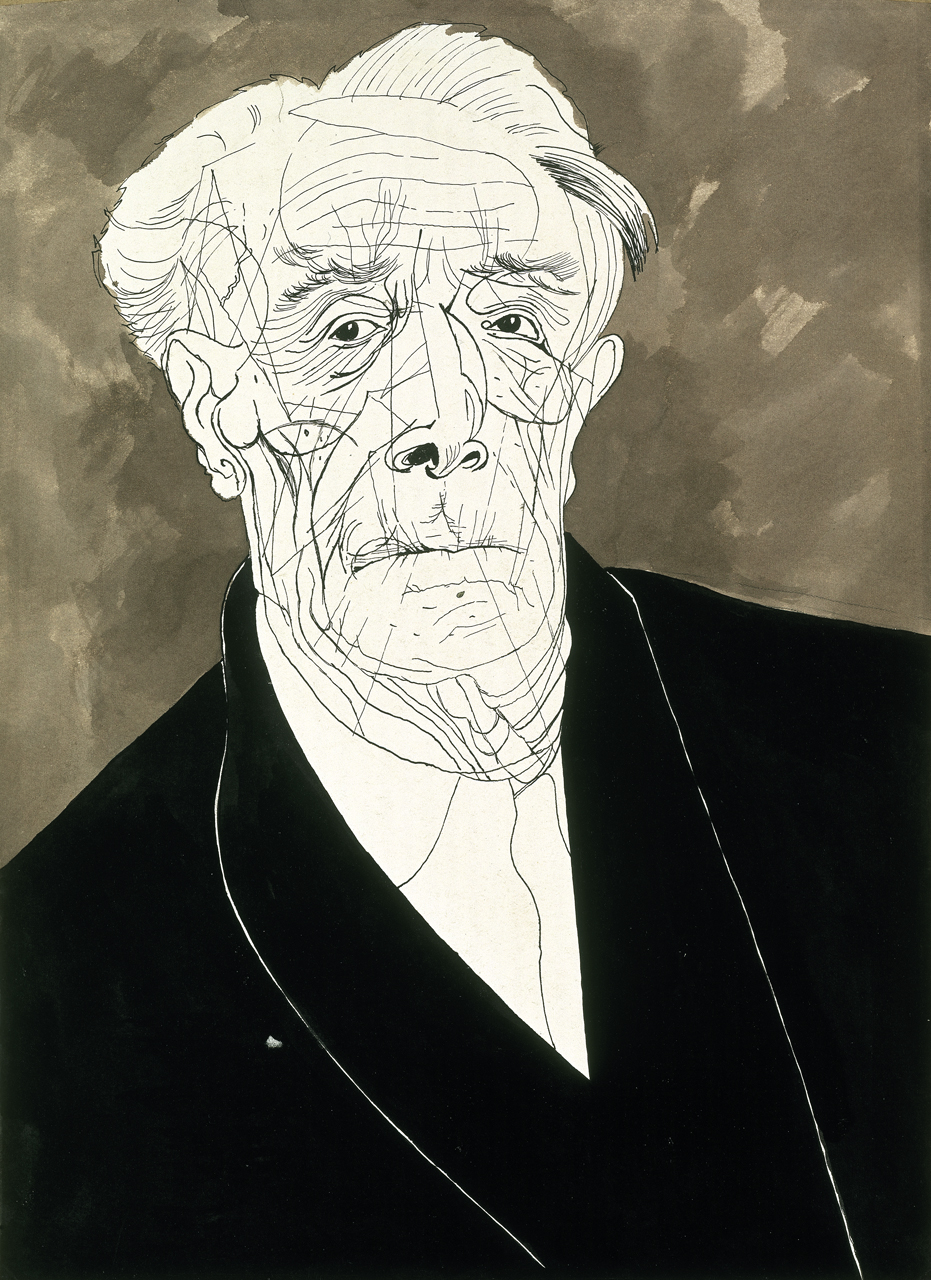
Adolf Hoffmeister, František Kupka, 1960

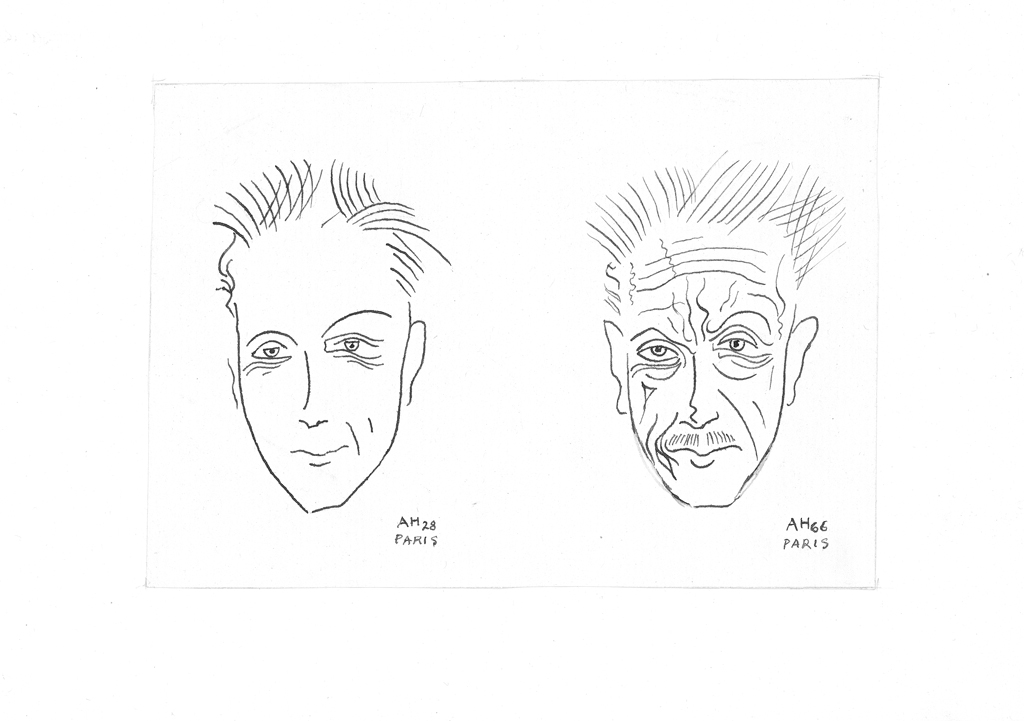
Adolf Hoffmeister, Josef Šíma, 1928, 1966

=== 1964–1968 ===
In 1964 he exhibited in London, Mannheim and Cairo, at the Venice Biennale and at several places in Czechoslovakia. He participated in the Cannes Film Festival and was chairman of the Karlovy Vary International Film Festival.

At the Second Congress of the Union of Czechoslovak Visual Artists, held in December 1964, where 3/4 of the leadership of the Union was replaced, Adolf Hoffmeister won the secret ballot for chairman against a candidate nominated by the Communist Party of Czechoslovakia (Stanislav Libenský). During the congress the Union was reformed and in the following years Czech art flourished thanks to the foreign contacts that Hoffmeister supported and facilitated. The Communist Party of Czechoslovakia did not count on his election at all, as he even figured as the so-called main object in the State Security action called Snob, in which the police tried to compromise some influential artists who seemed to be sympathetic to Western culture.

In 1965–1967, as chairman of the Union of Czechoslovak Visual Artists (SČVU), he ensured cooperation with Bloc officials, the Ministry of Culture, and the Cultural Department of the Communist Party of Czechoslovakia, took care of the social and intermediary activities of the Fine Arts Fund, and supervised the activities of the newly established Artcenter, which was in charge of selling artworks abroad and establishing normal market relations. He proposed to build a network of small galleries in Husova Street on the model of Paris. Together with Jindřich Chalupecký, he tried to encourage publishing by changing the editorial boards of magazines and the publishing house of the SČVU. He supported the first International Sculpture Symposium in Vyšné Ružbachy. As early as 1965, he succeeded in reforming the leadership of the SČVU and abolishing the positions of some secretaries controlled by the Central Committee of the Communist Party of Czechoslovakia and decentralizing the management of the exhibition program.

In 1965, he exhibited in Havana, Bochum, Baden-Baden, Liberec (catalogue text by Ludmila Vachtová), Bratislava, and the Brothers Čapek Gallery in Prague (catalogue text by Václav Havel).

In 1966 he arranged the second part of the congress of the International Association of Art Critics in Czechoslovakia, including accompanying exhibitions. He developed official contacts with France, Italy and East Germany, Poland and Austria. On the initiative of J. Chalupecký, he established contacts with the unofficial art scene in the Soviet Union. He was a member of the jury at the Tours Film Festival, where Macourek's award-winning film Who Wants to Kill Jessie? was presented for the first time (it also won prizes at Trieste and Locarno in 1966). In February 1966 he opened exhibitions of Czechoslovak graphic artists in Essen and Bochum, and in March he was general commissioner of the joint exhibition of Czech and French Cubism at the Musée national d'art moderne in Paris (Paris-Prague 1906–1930).

He participated as head of the delegation in the symposium of Czechoslovak and Soviet artists organized in Moscow at the initiative of the Soviet Union, visited Armenia, Azerbaijan, and in May and June visited the exhibition prepared for the 1967 World Exhibition in Montreal. He then attended a meeting of the PEN Club in New York City, where Arthur Miller and Saul Bellow were the speakers. He visited Jiří Voskovec and Edward Albee. He exhibited at the Spring Exhibition at the Mánes Gallery and the exhibition Current Tendencies in Czech Art, organized by the Czechoslovak section of the AICA. He was a delegate of the Czechoslovak Republic to the UNESCO General Conference in Paris.

In 1967, as the chairman of the Union of Czechoslovak Visual Artists, he proposed the establishment of the Coordination Committee of Creative Unions. At the Prague Congress of the AICA he was elected a full member. He has exhibited in London, at the University of Political Sciences of the Communist Party of Czechoslovakia, in Jindřichův Hradec, České Budějovice, at the Museum Folkwang in Essen and in Prešov. He travelled to Paris and Venice.

In January 1968 he was re-elected chairman of the Union of Czechoslovak Visual Artists and actively participated in the revival activities of the Prague Spring. He attempted to revive the ideals of the avant-garde while at the same time suppressing radical views. (For an example of his political activity at the time, see his signature on a letter from cultural workers to the Central Committee of the Communist Party of Czechoslovakia in March 1968.) In May, he represented visual artists at the first meeting of the Coordinating Committee of Creative Unions. He became a member of the Communist Party's advisory commission chaired by Jan Werich and participated in the artists-communists' meeting at the Wallenstein Palace (5 June 1968). He was given judicial expungement by the Ministry of Foreign Affairs on 14 June. At the end of June he was a representative of the national commission at the UNESCO conference in Monte Carlo.

In July he attended a meeting of the Czech National Council, where he spoke with Dubček and was appointed a member of the Cultural Commission of the Communist Party of Czechoslovakia. After the invasion of the occupation troops on 21 August, he fell into depression. He perceived the collapse of his ideals of the cultural and political avant-garde as a defeat in his life. He was offered a professorship at the newly founded experimental university Centre Universitaire in Vincennes, France. He was elected president of the jury of the International exhibition of tapestries in Lausanne. Jean-Paul Sartre and Simone de Beauvoir visited him in Prague. Throughout the year he drew images of contemporary Czech writers for A.J. Liehm's forthcoming book of interviews Generation, to be published by Československý spisovatel publishing house in 1969 (published in Czech in 1988 by the exile publishing house Index on Censorship and in 1990 in the publishing house of the Czech Republic). He created several collages on the invasion of Czechoslovakia in August 1968.

During 1968 he exhibited his collages in Rome, Cheb, Prague, Havlíčkův Brod and was represented at the exhibitions 50 Years of Czechoslovak Painting (Aleš South Bohemian Gallery in Hluboká nad Vltavou) and Fifty Years of Czechoslovak Painting 1918–1968 – 300 Painters, Sculptors and Graphic Artists of Five Generations (National Gallery Prague, Slovak National Gallery in Bratislava).

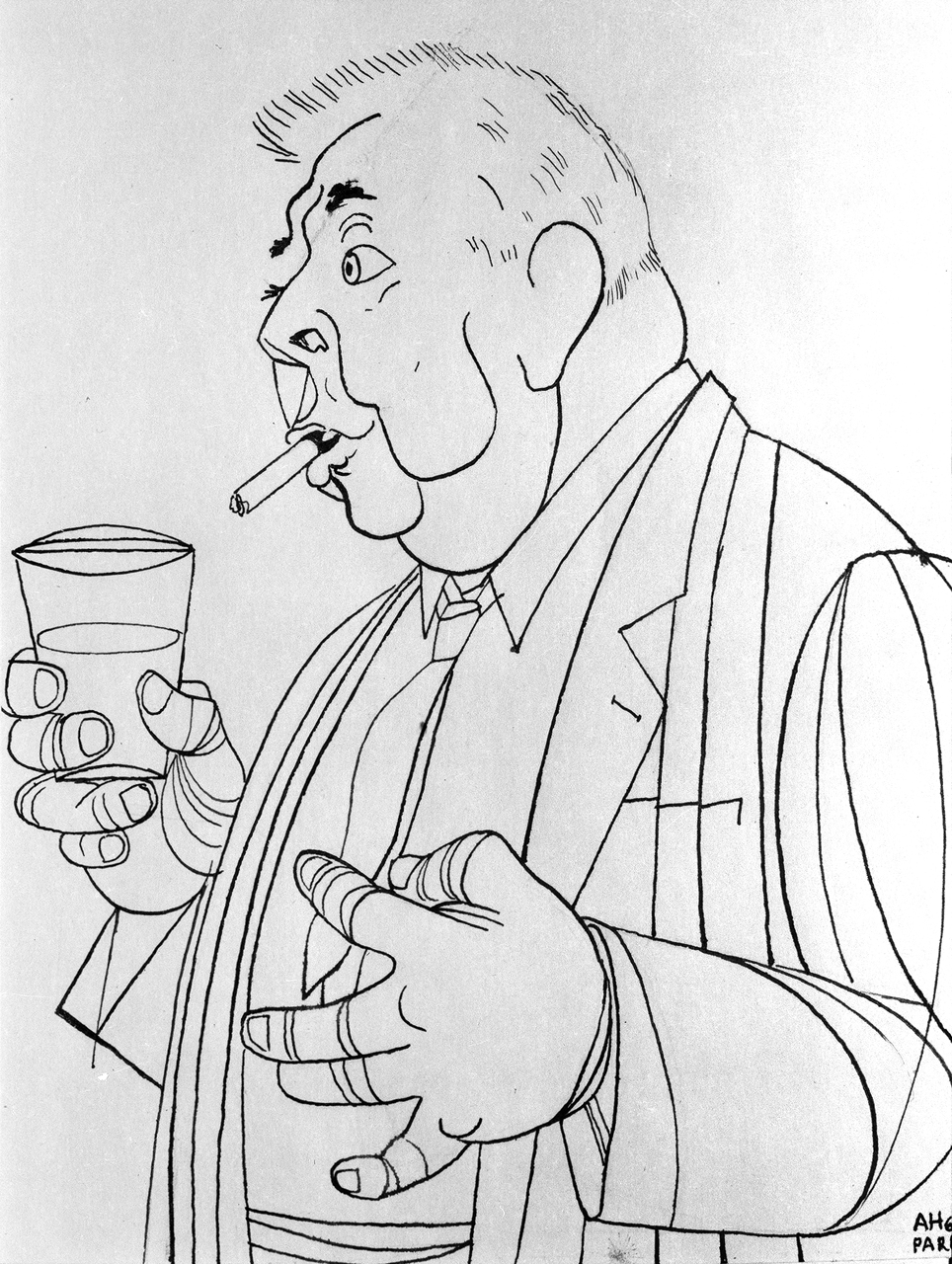
Adolf Hoffmeister, Jacques Prévert, 1960

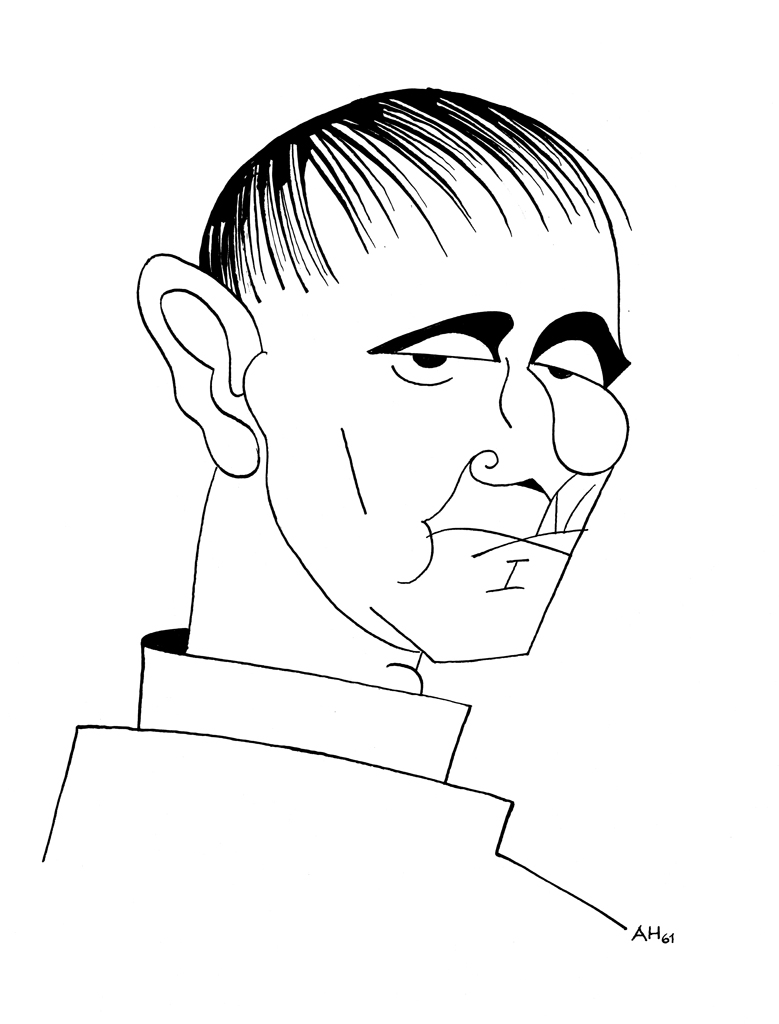
Adolf Hoffmeister, Bertolt Brecht, 1961

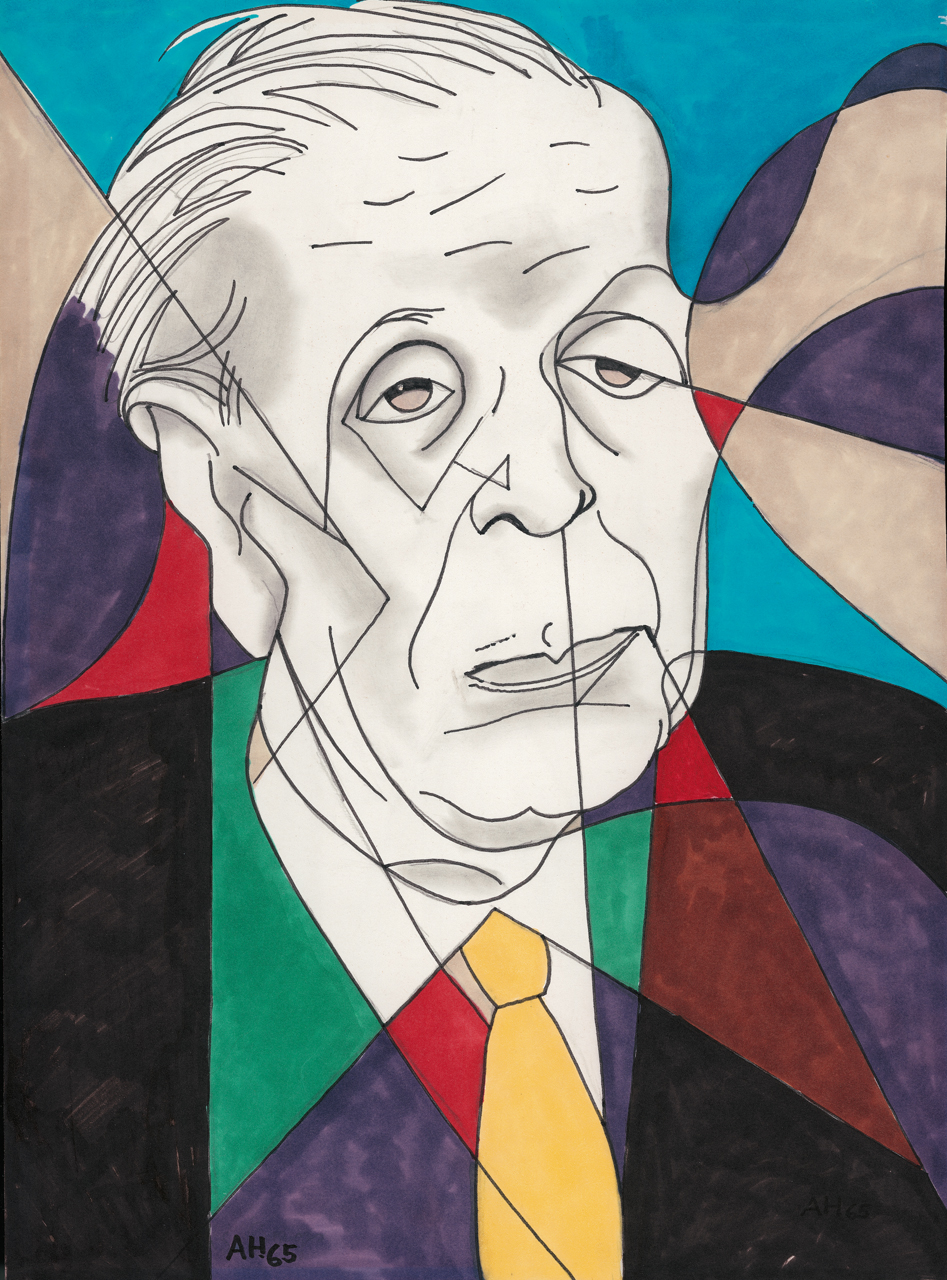
Adolf Hoffmeister, Jorge Luis Borges, 1965

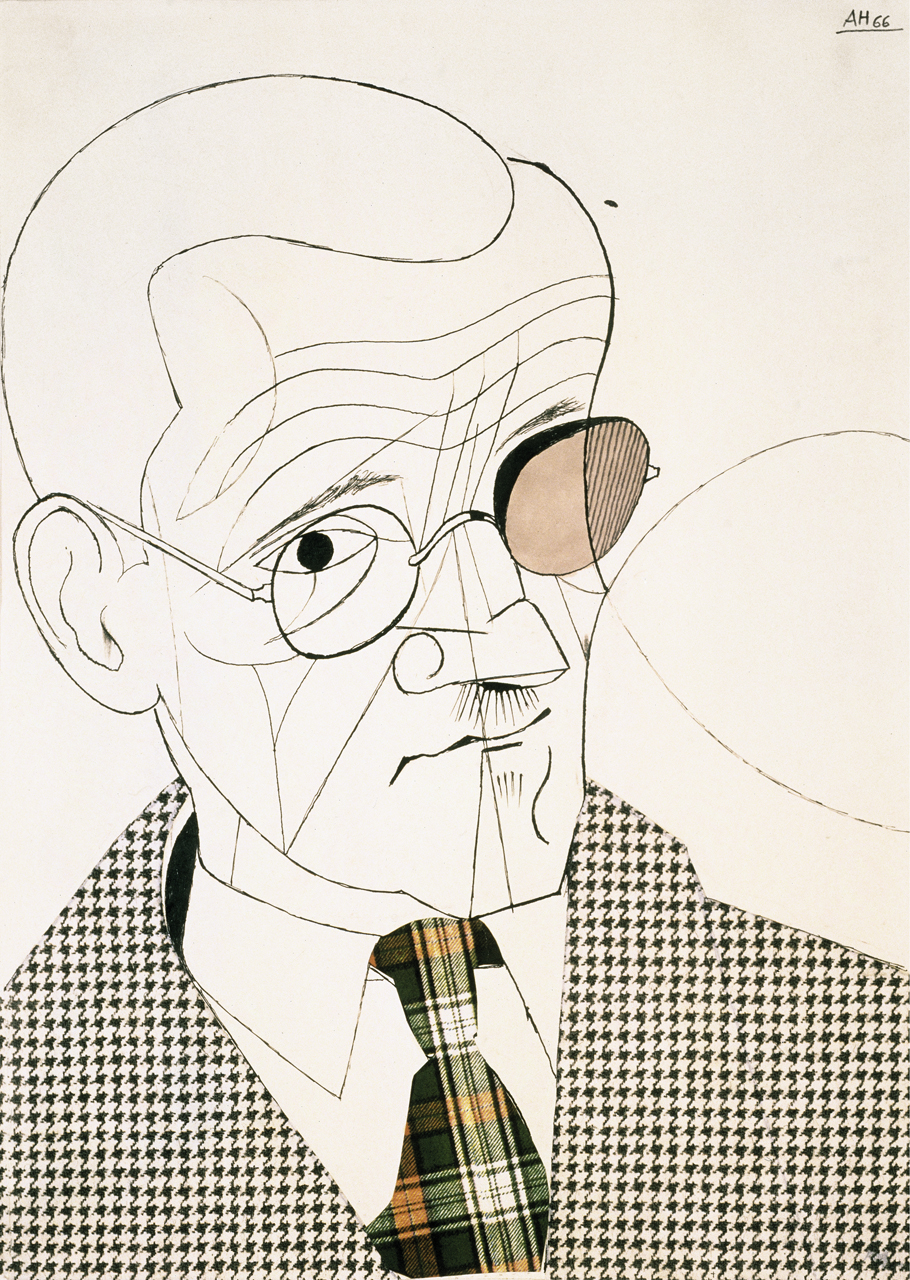
Adolf Hoffmeister, James Joyce, 1966

=== 1969–1973 ===
In 1969, as chairperson of the Union of Czechoslovak Artists, he supported the exhibition Sculpture and the City, organized by Hana Seifertová in Liberec (Kaddish by Aleš Veselý was exhibited). In connection with the federalization of the state, the Union of Czechoslovak Artists was dissolved and two national associations were established in its place. Hoffmeister spoke at the founding meeting of the Union of Czech Visual Artists in April 1969 and announced at the same time his intention not to run for chairman. The Ministry of the Interior of the Czech Socialist Republic subsequently refused to approve the statutes of the Union. This act was the pretext for a large-scale purge and, along with Hoffmeister, members of the former presidium lost their positions. Subsequently, in May 1969, at its last (and officially banned) meeting, the Coordinating Committee of Czech Creative Unions decided to terminate its function due to obstacles preventing normal activity.

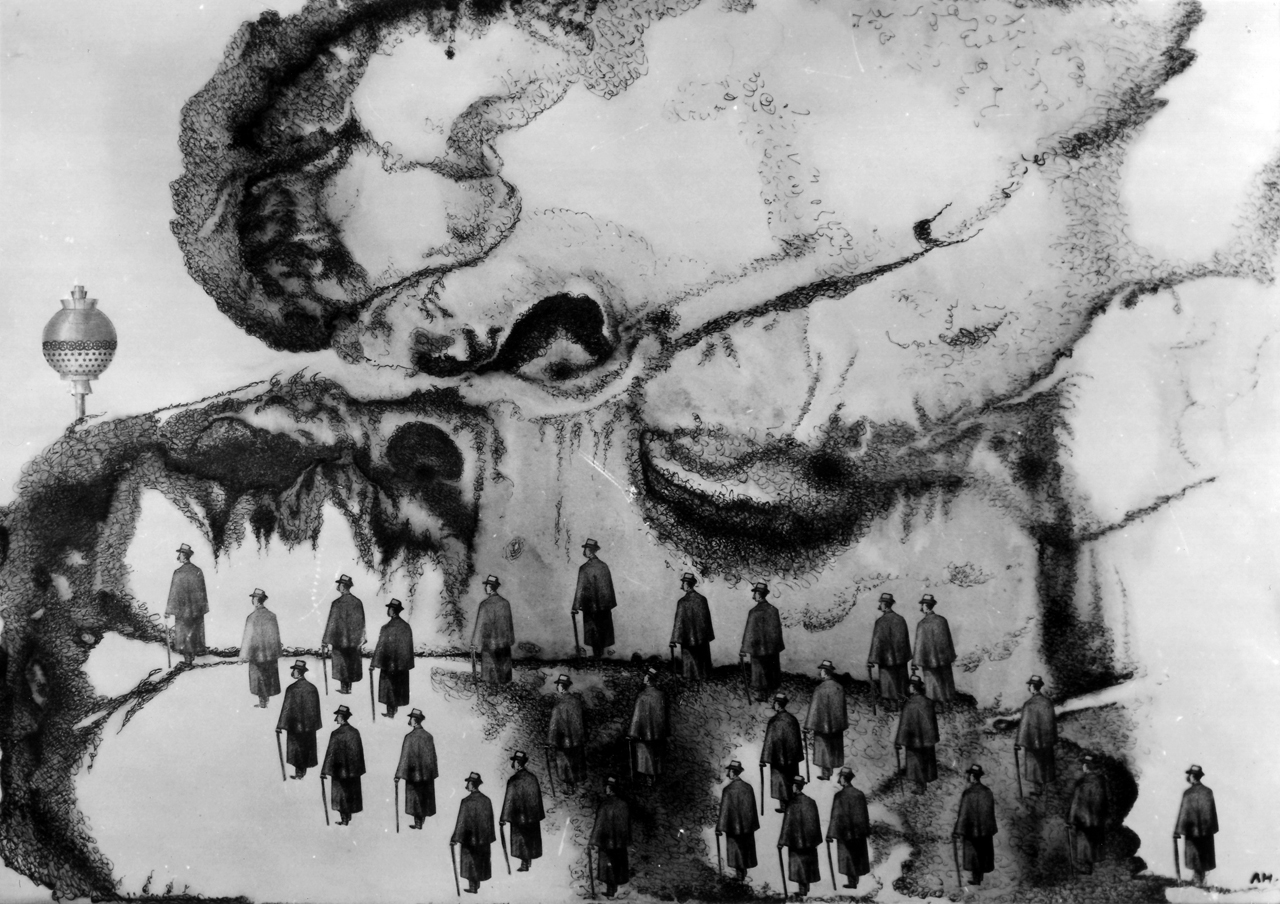
Adolf Hoffmeister, Where are we heading, 1967

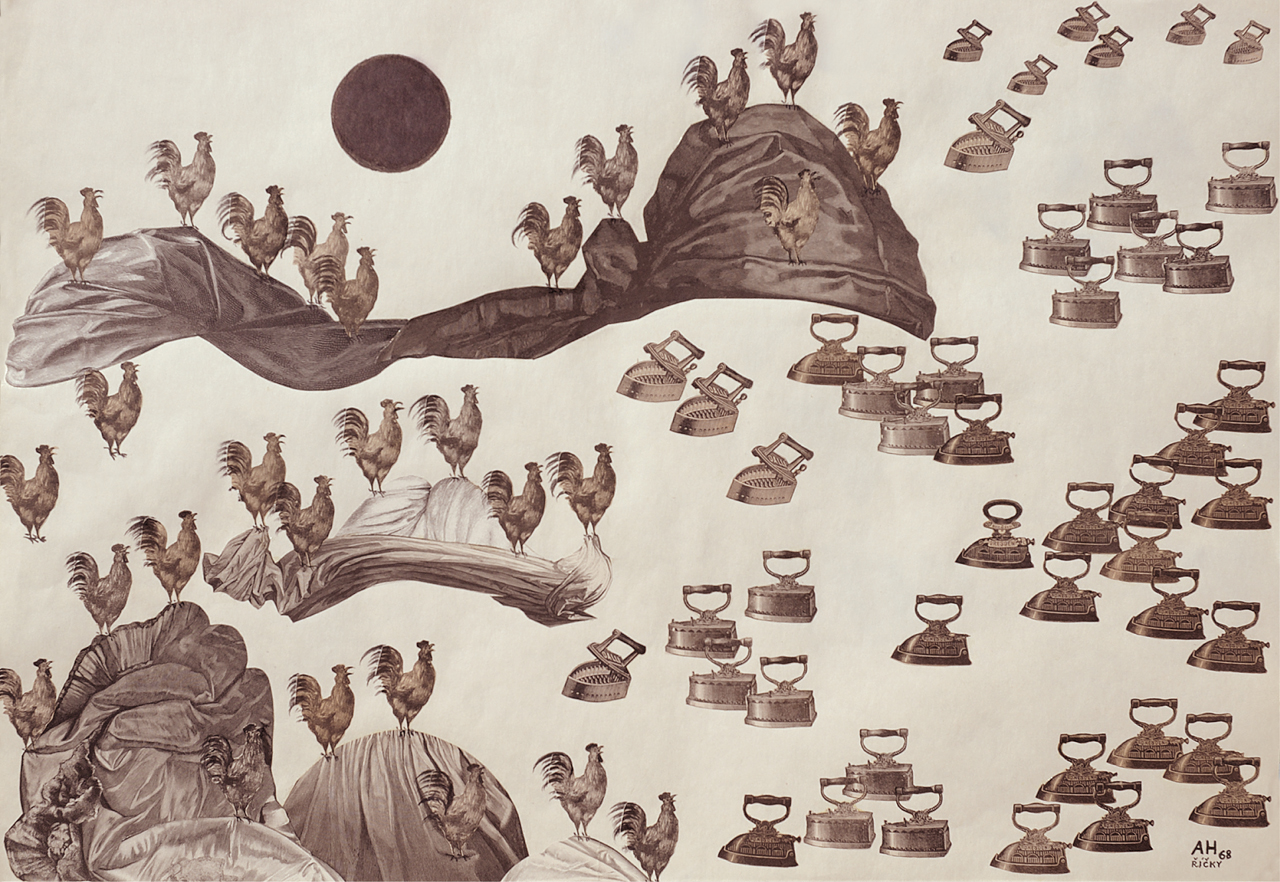
Adolf Hoffmeister, The internal political struggle of the irons against the roosters, 1968

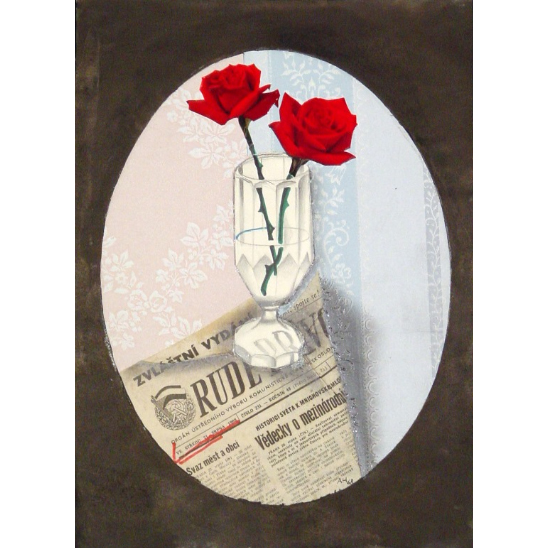
Adolf Hoffmeister, Still life, 21 August 1968

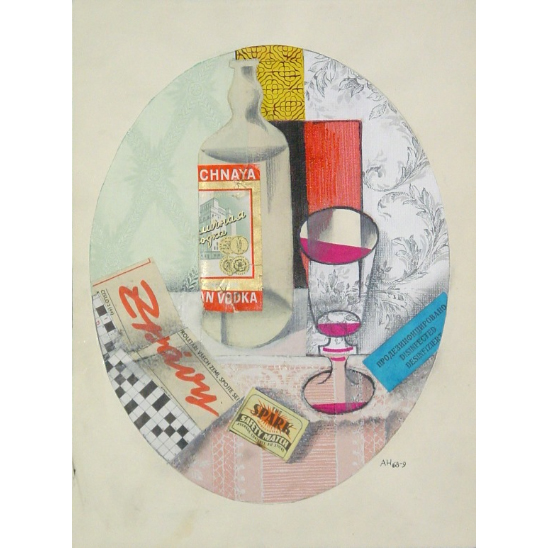
Adolf Hoffmeister, Collaborator's Still Life, 1968-1969

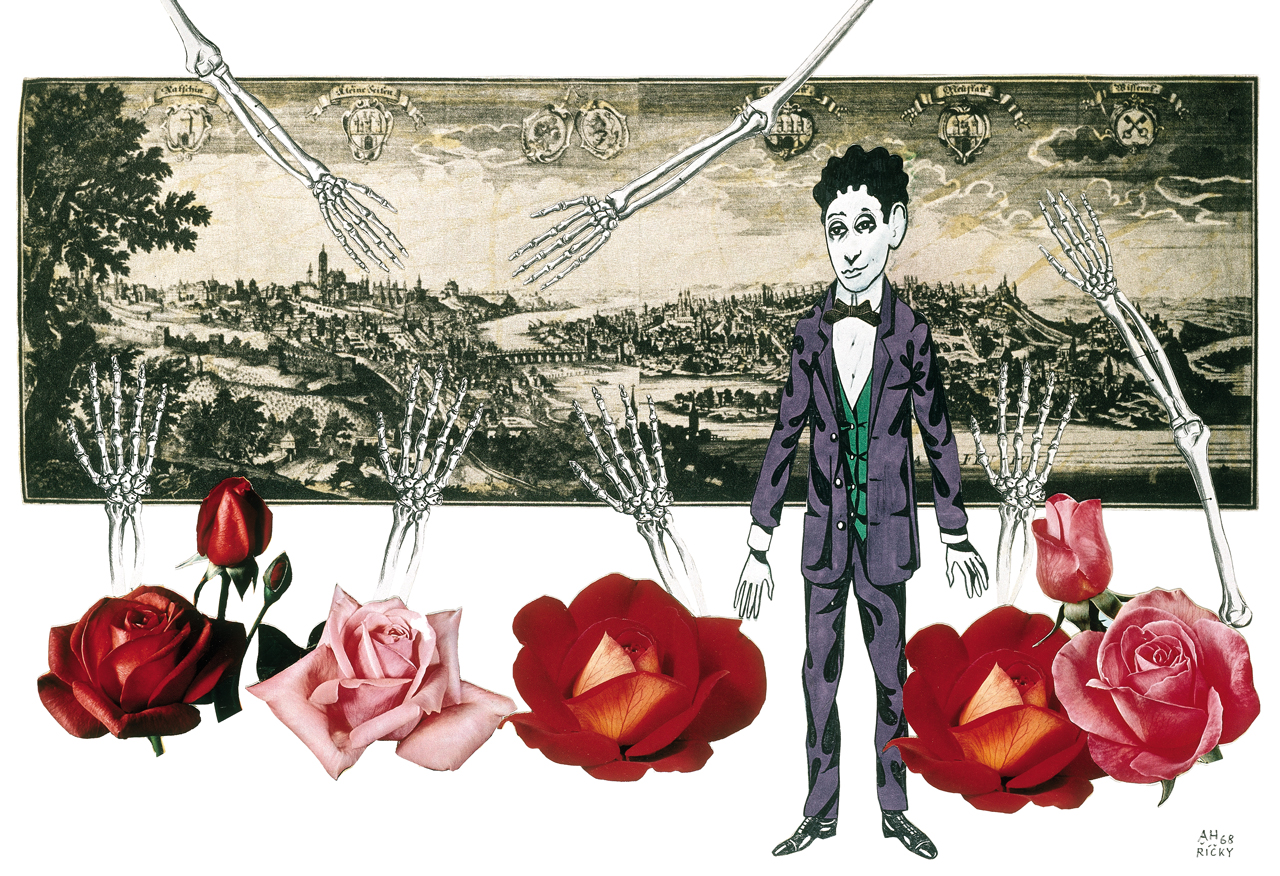
Adolf Hoffmeister, Franz Kafka, Ever threatened Prague, 1968

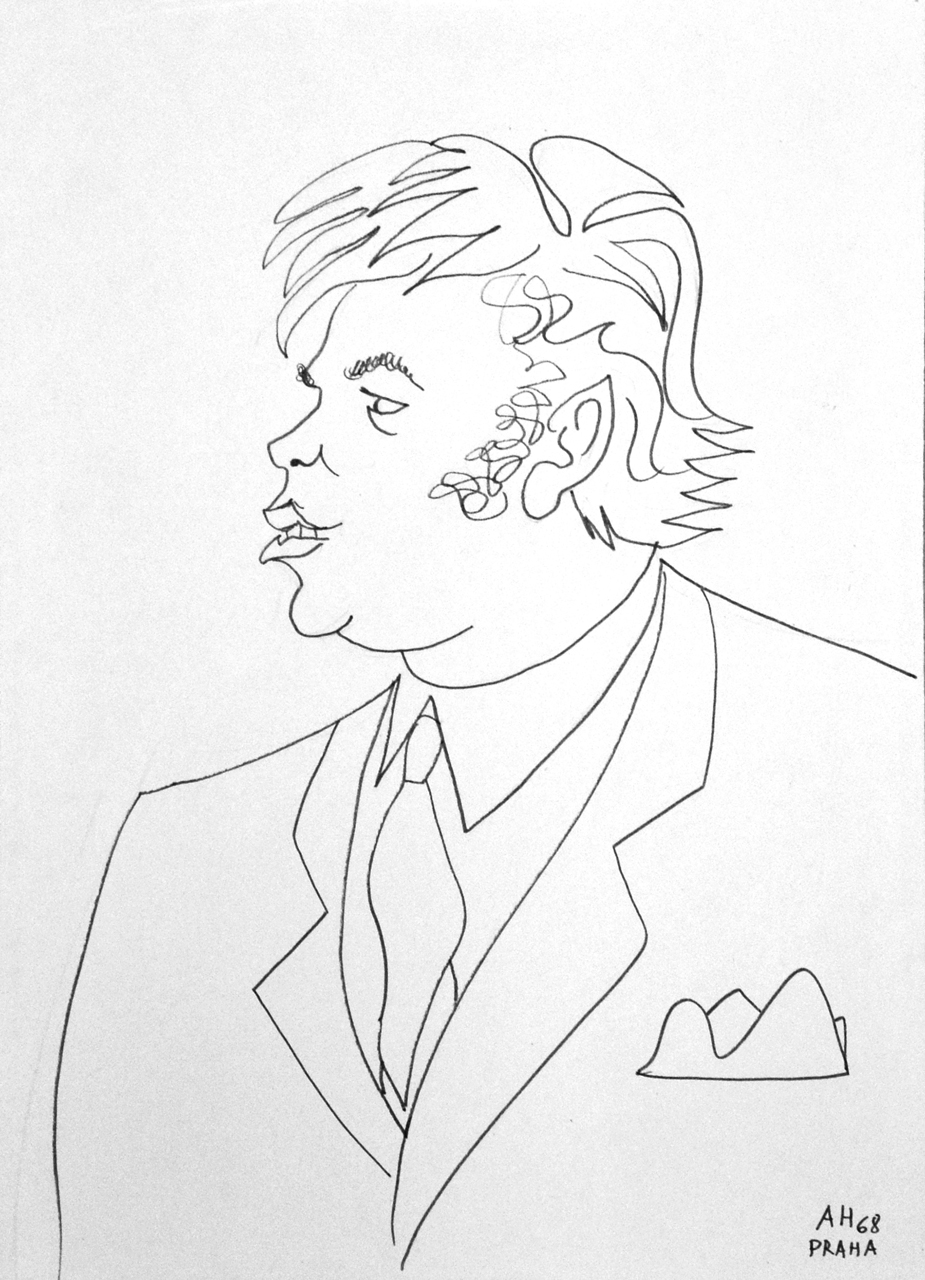
Adolf Hoffmeister, Václav Havel, 1968

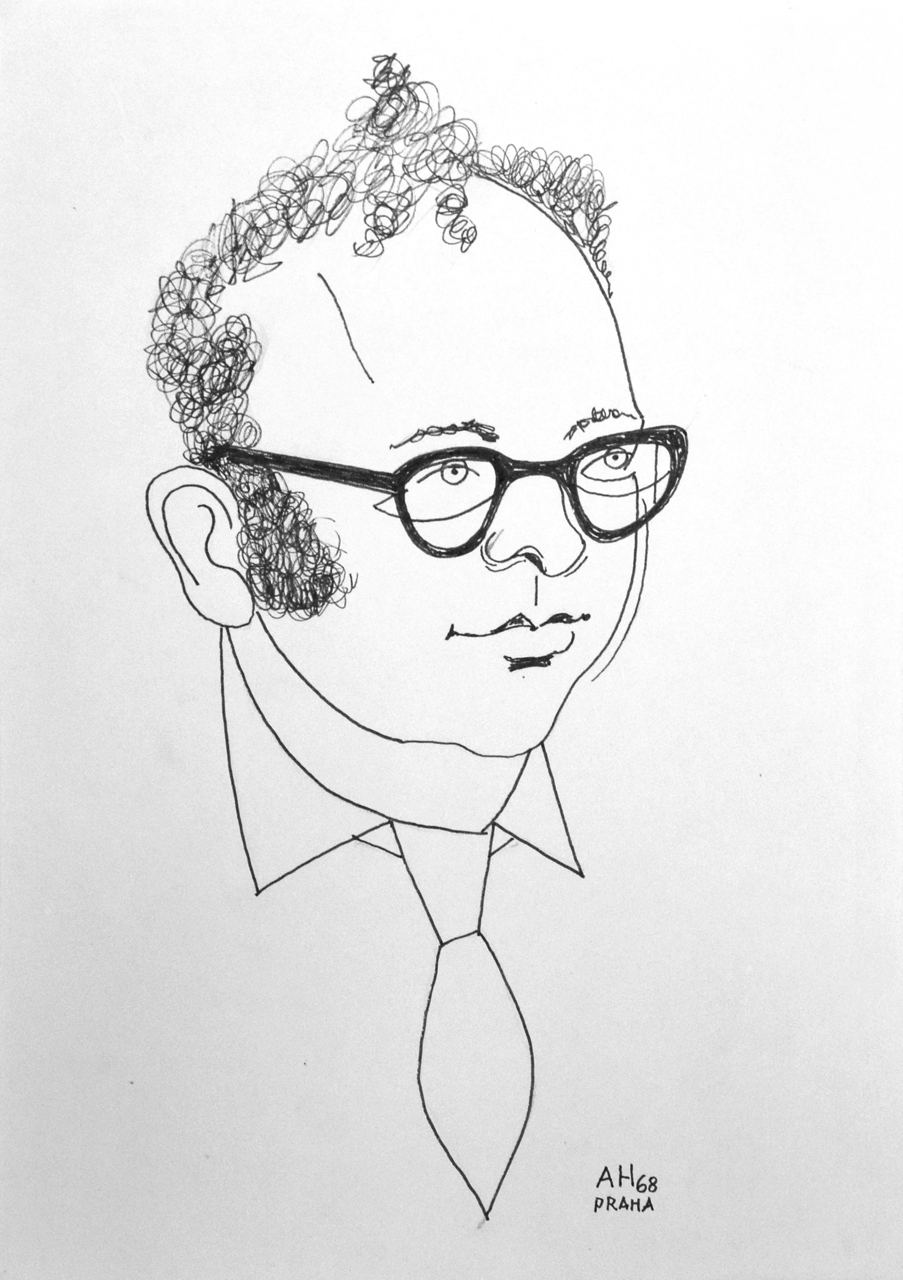
Adolf Hoffmeister, Josef Škvorecký, 1968

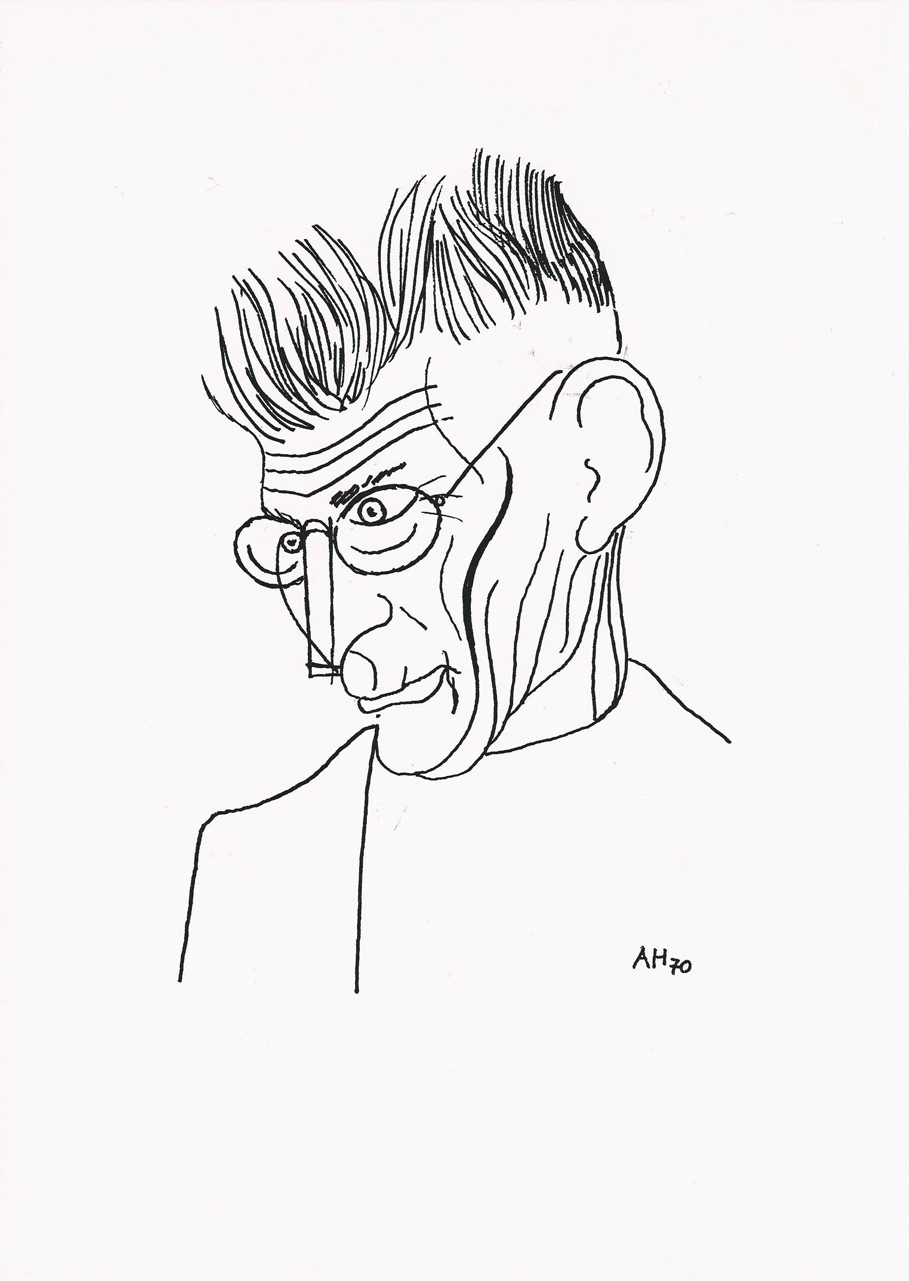
Adolf Hoffmeister, Samuel Beckett, 1970

Adolf Hoffmeister hosted Graham Greene in Prague in February 1969, visited Max Ernst in Paris in March and attended a PEN Club meeting in London. He gave a series of lectures on Czech culture in Vincennes, and after completing his semester at the Academy of Arts, Architecture and Design in Prague he went to Sweden to lecture on Czech avant-garde theatres and Czech scenography before the war. In October, he was preparing as general commissioner the exhibition Thousand Years of Czech and Slovak Culture, which was to be held in 1970 at the Grand Palais in Paris, but under the new normalization circumstances the exhibition was cancelled. His next series of lectures in Vincennes was interrupted by strikes of left-wing students. He met Ernst, Chagall, Malraux, Effel and Aragon. He exhibited at the Palais des Beaux-Arts in Brussels, in Hamburg, Karlovy Vary and prepared an exhibition of Jiří Trnka.

In 1970 he was retired after his application for an extension of his employment at the Academy of Arts, Architecture and Design in Prague was rejected. Until May he was still lecturing in Vincennes. He was summoned to the Central Committee of the Communist Party of Czechoslovakia for an inquiry and subsequently expelled from the Communist Party of Czechoslovakia and from all public, publishing and exhibition activities.

He retreated into seclusion and devoted himself to drawings and collages and returned to writing plays (Greek Tragedy, 1970, Execution, 1971, Pissoir, 1973). In 1971 he created illustrations for the book Alice's Surprise, a paraphrase of Lewis Carroll's work.

In 1972 he received long-term treatment after a myocardial infarction. The Mars Bar in Kladno hosted a ceremony for columns with Hoffmeister's collages created the previous year. At the founding congress of the normalization Union of Czech Artists in December 1972, Adolf Hoffmeister was mentioned most often in connection with criticism of the past reform years. He was accused of "calling into question the foundations of socialist art culture." The report of the presidium of the new normalization preparatory committee of the Union for the Constituent Congress of 20 December 1972 states about him that "after January 1968 he intensified his revisionist and increasingly clear anti-party aggressive efforts."

In 1973 he wrote a short play, Pissoir, dedicated to Edward Albee (not published until 1990) and held a private exhibition of his last collages in his apartment in Pod Bruskou Street. He died of a heart attack on 24 July 1973 at his cottage in Říčky v Orlických horách. He was buried at Olšany Cemetery.

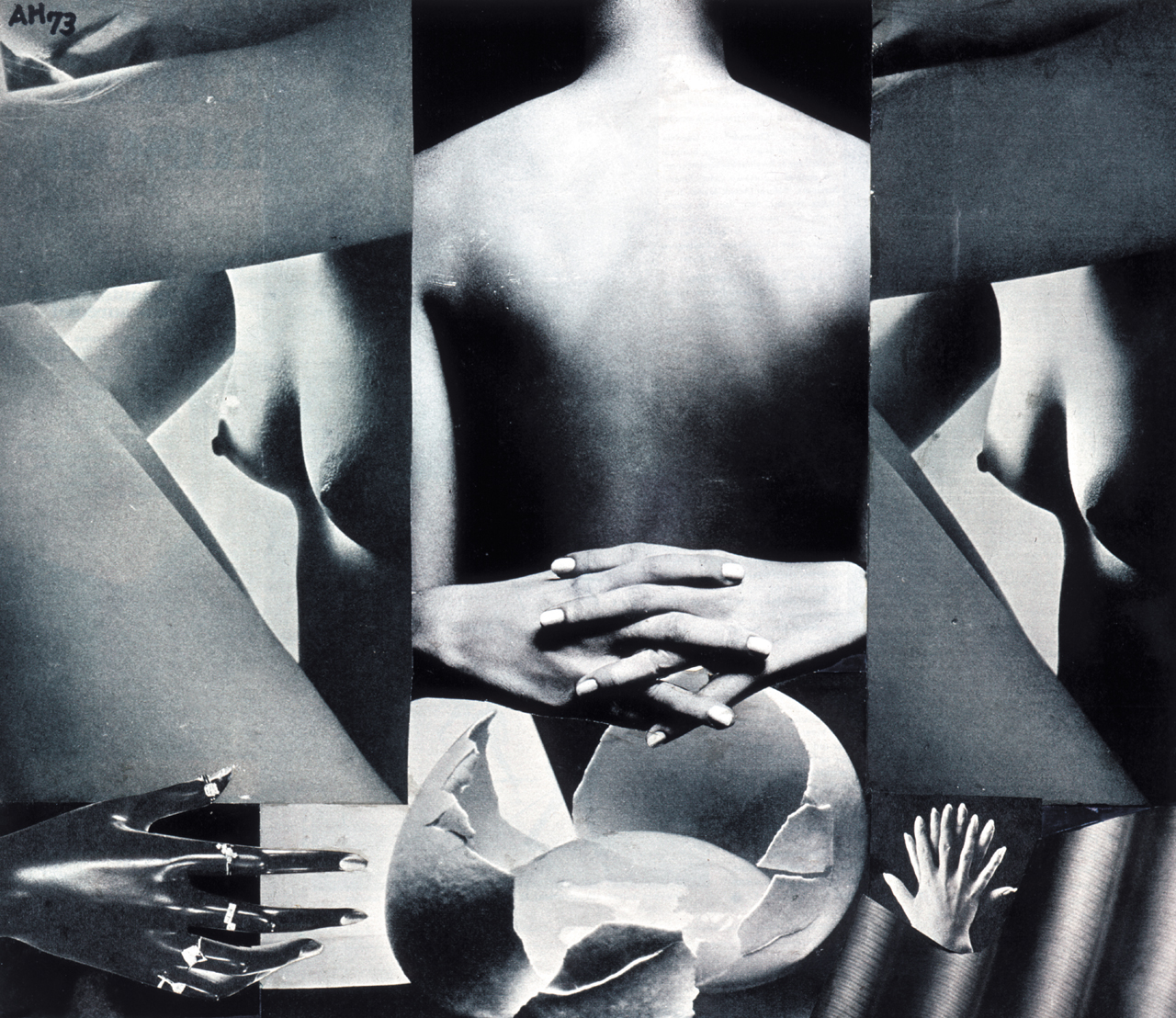
Adolf Hoffmeister, Broken Life, 1973

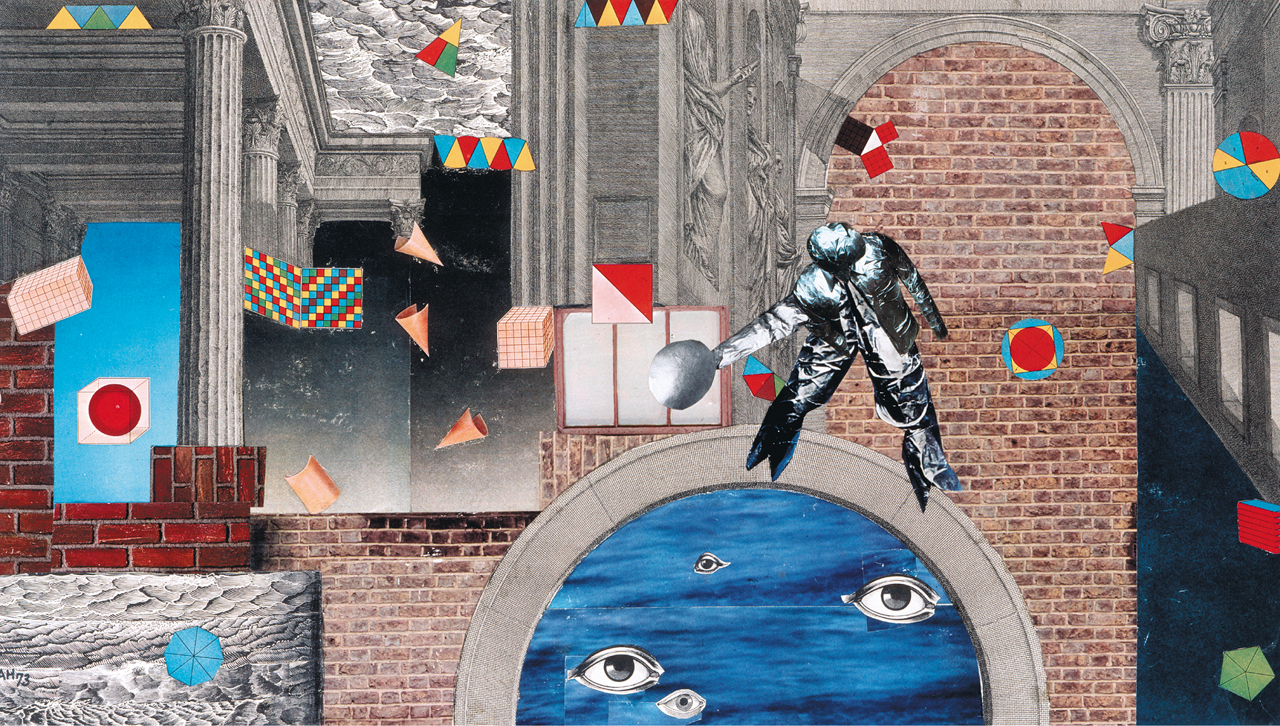
Adolf Hoffmeister, Remains of Human Civilization. Details outlive man, 1973

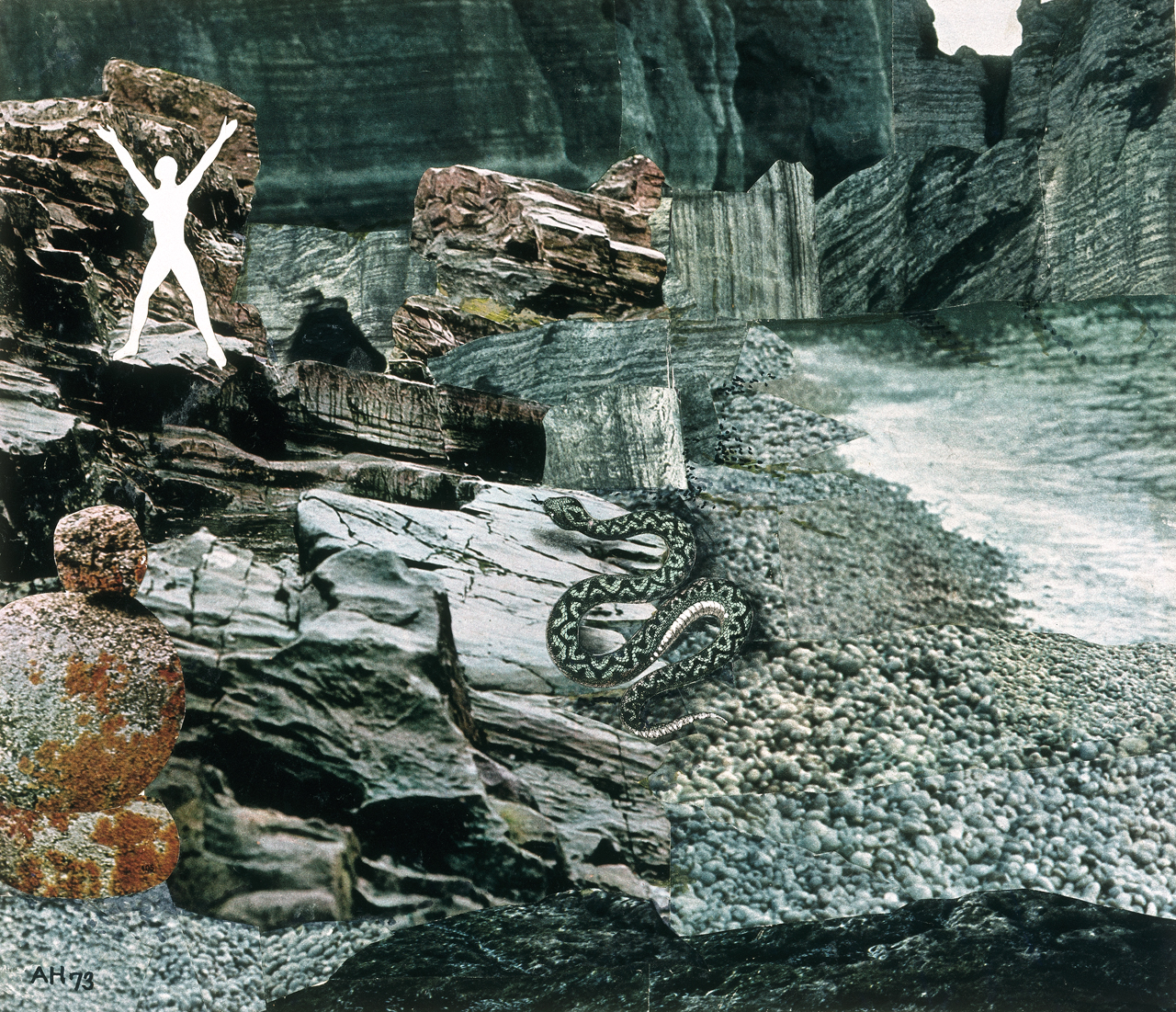
Adolf Hoffmeister, There are white places left on Earth by humans, 1973

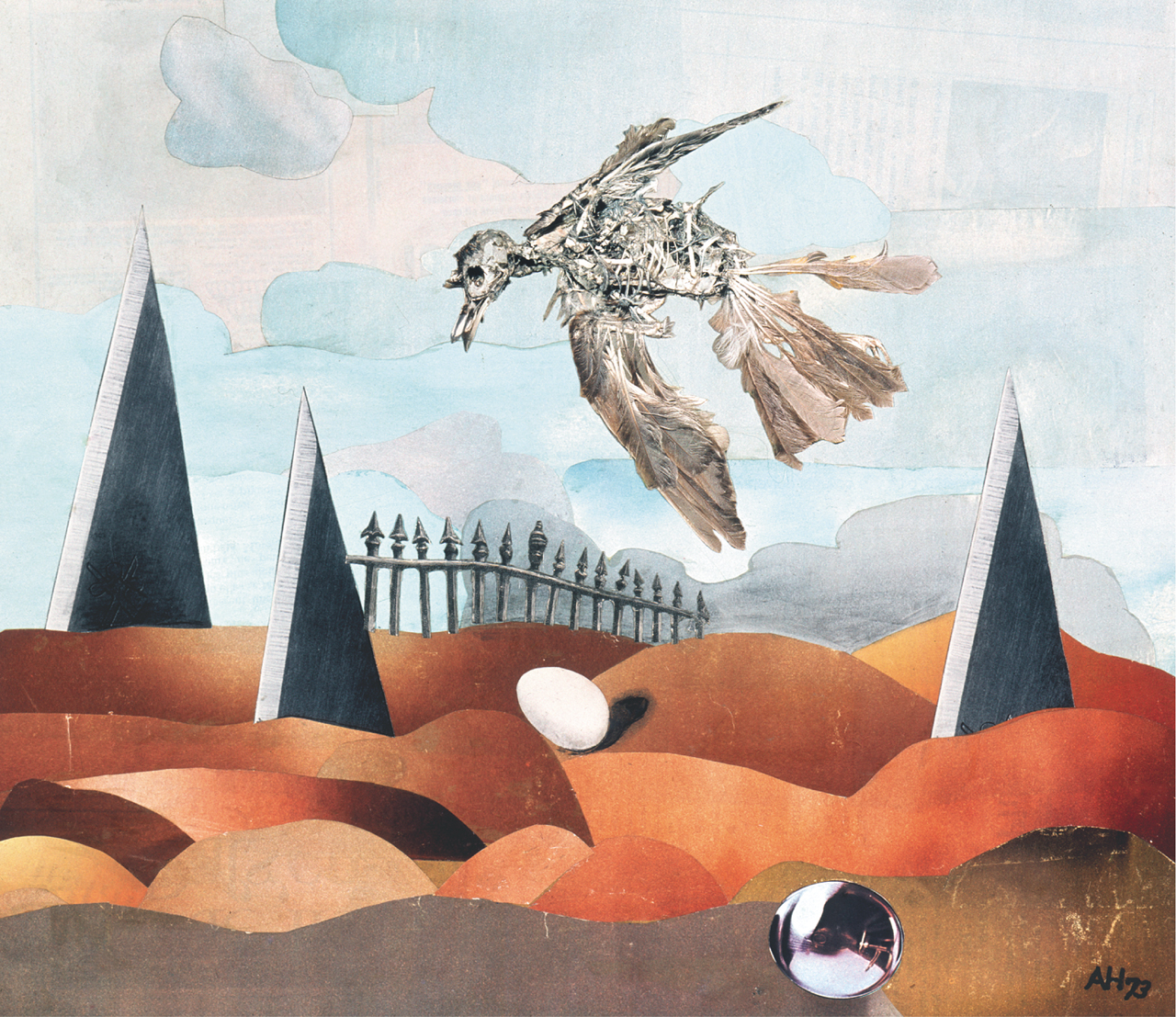
Adolf Hoffmeister, Life and Death II, 1973

== Cultural and political engagement ==
In 1920 he co-founded the Union of Modern Culture – Devětsil, was a member of the Mánes Union of Fine Arts, and a member of cultural and political organisations (Left Front, Society for Economic and Cultural Rapprochement with New Russia, Club of Czech and German Theatre Workers). After emigrating to France, he was in contact with resistance organisations and founded the centre of Czechoslovak cultural workers in exile. Since March 1944, Hoffmeister headed the Czechoslovak section of the Voice of America.

From 1945 until his expulsion in 1970 he was a member of the Communist Party of Czechoslovakia. In 1945–1948 he was the head of the VI Department of the Ministry of Information and Education, where he was in charge of foreign cultural relations.

In February 1948 he became chairman of the action committee of the Union of Czechoslovak Visual Artists. From 1948 he was Czechoslovakia's permanent delegate to UNESCO and in 1948–1950 he served as Czechoslovak ambassador in France. He was deputy head of the Czechoslovak delegation to the Third and Fourth General Assembly of the United Nations in New York City (1948, 1949) and a candidate for the UN Security Council. As a commissioner he organised a number of foreign exhibitions.

In 1964–1968 he was chairman of the Union of Czechoslovak Visual Artists and chairman of the Czechoslovak PEN Club. At the Prague Congress in 1967 he was elected a full member of the International Association of Art Critics. During the Prague Spring he was appointed a member of the Cultural Commission of the Central Committee of the Communist Party of Czechoslovakia.

From 1951 he was a professor at the Cartoon and Puppet Film Studio at the Academy of Arts and Crafts in Prague, and from 1968 a professor at the newly founded experimental college Centre Universitaire in Vincennes.

== Awards ==
- 1937 Gold medal at the World Exhibition in Paris.
- 1946 French Order of the Legion of Honour
- 1947 Commander of the Order of the Crown of Romania
- 1947 Commander of the Order of Polonia Restituta
- 1958 French Chevalier de l'Ordre des Arts et Lettres
- 1960 Order of the Republic (Czechoslovakia)
- 1962 Meritorious Artist (Czechoslovakia)

== Work ==
Adolf Hoffmeister was a lawyer, politician, cartoonist, illustrator, collage artist, writer, poet, playwright, and organizer of foreign exhibitions and art collector. Some of his texts have the authentic contemporary testimony or historical documentary, most of what he drew or edited and pasted as collages retains the lasting validity of a living work of art. Philippe Soupault described Hoffmeister on the occasion of his 1961 exhibition in Paris as one of the most famous portraitists of our time.

=== Paintings ===
Hoffmeister was one of the leading figures of the second generation of the pre-war Czech avant-garde, who had the opportunity to experience Western modern art before the outbreak of the First World War and published his artistic and literary experiments while still at grammar school. At the "Real Gymnasium in Křemencova Street" he learned to draw according to the model under Camillo Stuchlík and in drawing classes taught by Ladislav Šíma. His first drawings and linocuts, based on Czech cuboexpressionism, were made between 1917 and 1919 (Still Life at the Window, linocut, 1917). In the following series of pastels, his desire to express reality with simple synthetic symbols led him to the verge of abstraction (Landscape at the Lake, 1918). From 1920 onwards, social themes became important to him, which demanded more dramatic expressionist means of articulation (War, 1920).

He gradually absorbed the influences of Kubišta, Morandi, Rousseau and synthetic cubism and integrated them into his own style of poetic naivism, which was more of an intellectual construction or a particular primitivist form of Dada. Devětsil consciously gravitated towards creators outside the currents of contemporary modernism, such as Henri Rousseau and Jan Zrzavý, while the post-war primitivizing idiom was meant to bring about a revival of the original feeling destroyed by civilization. Rousseau attracted Hoffmeister throughout his life, and he never stopped returning to him (The Ship of Columbus, 1921–1922, The Bridge, 1922). Rousseau's vision of Eden was intertwined with the idea of a classless society promoted by the Communist party.

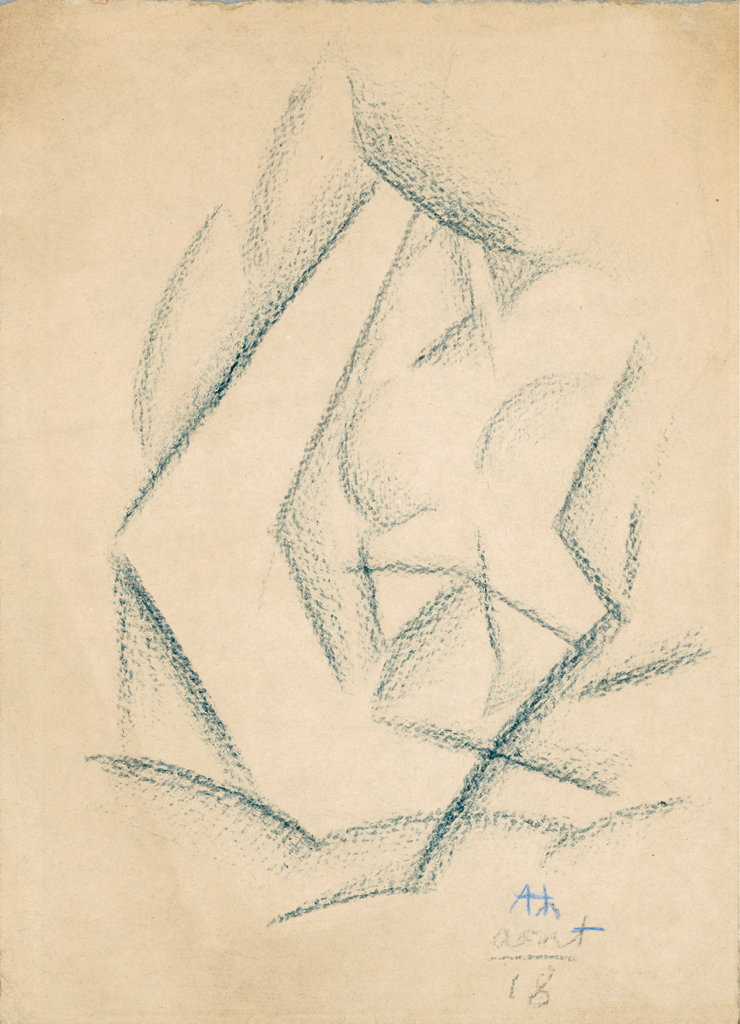
Adolf Hoffmeister, Path, 1918

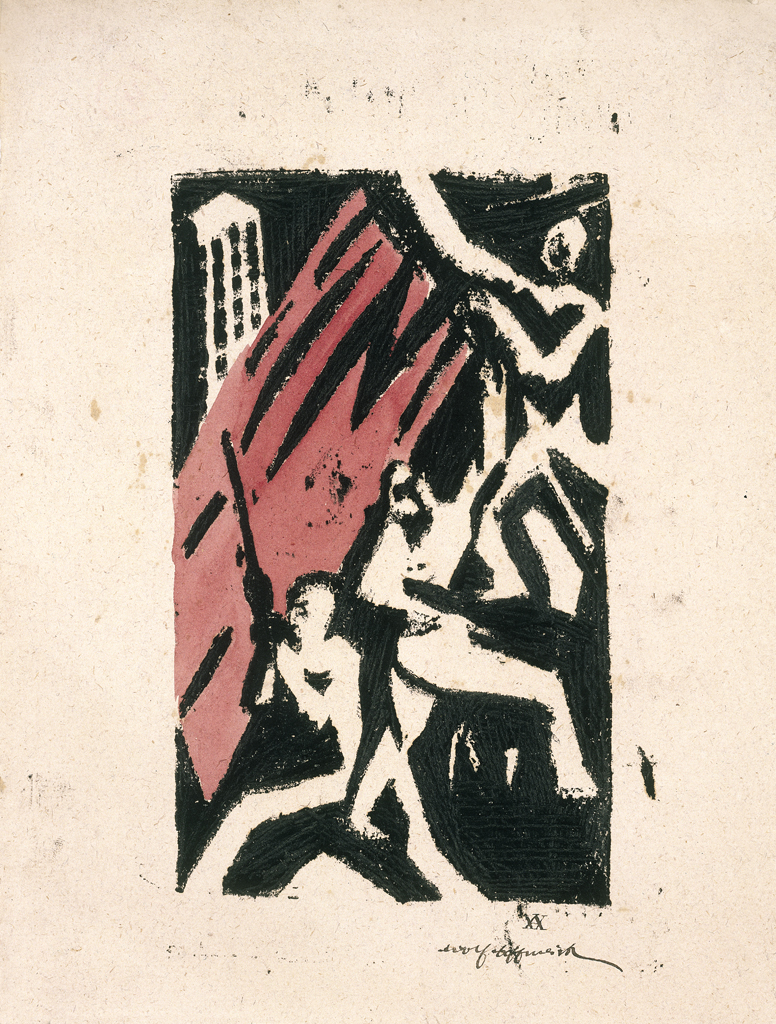
Adolf Hoffmeister, Revolution, 1920

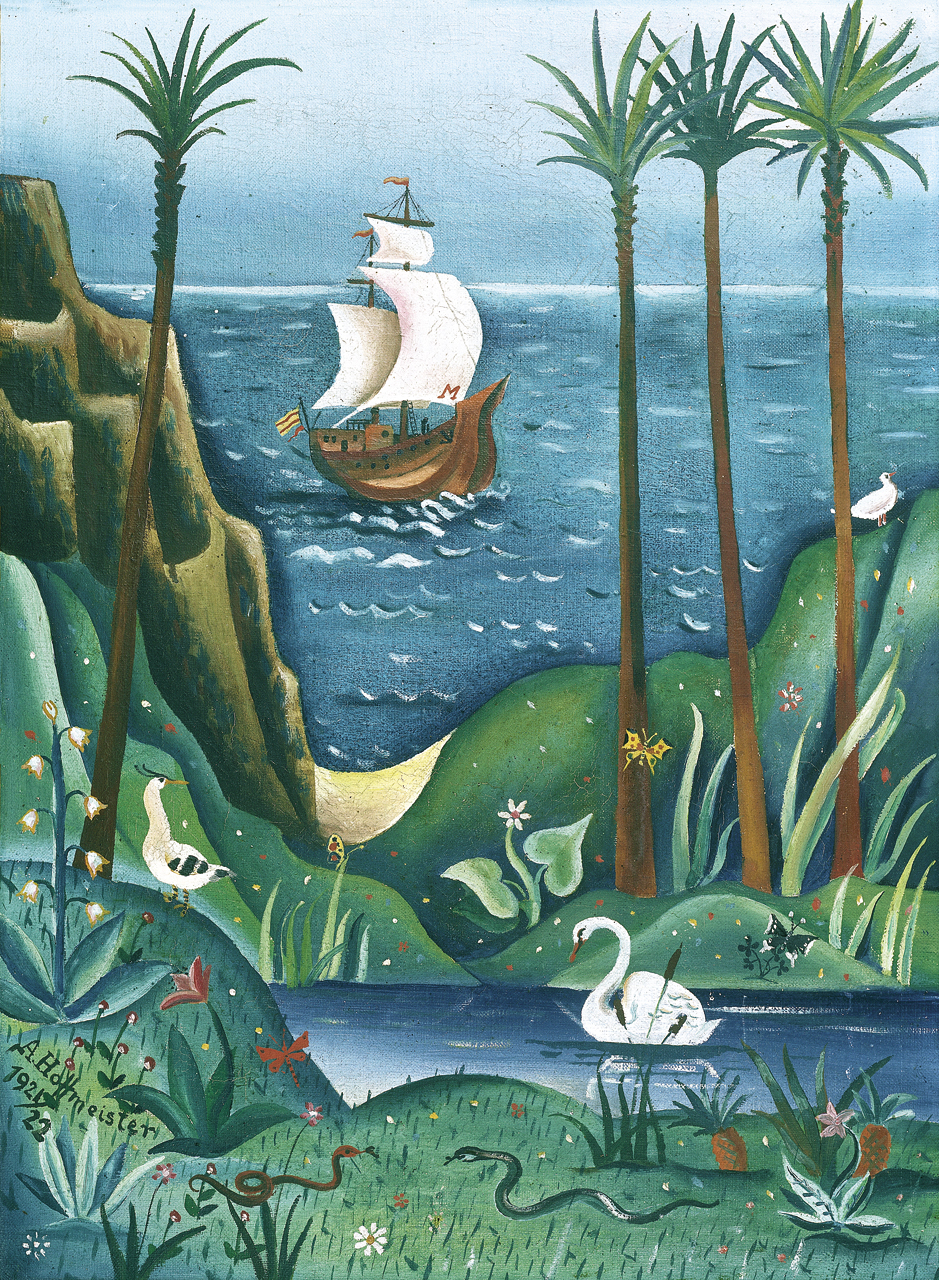
Adolf Hoffmeister, The Ship of Columbus, 1921–1922

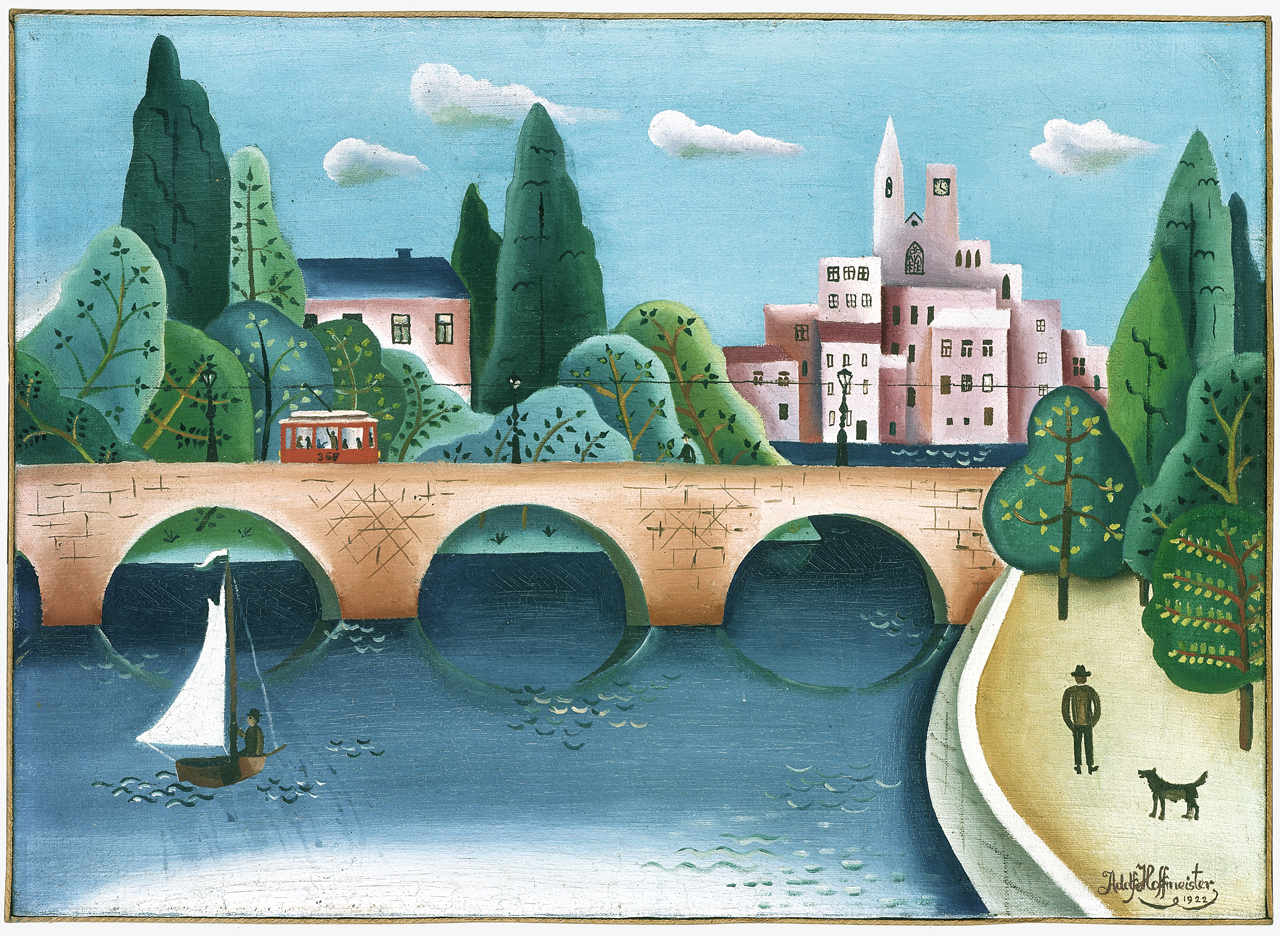
Adolf Hoffmeister, Landscape with Bridge, 1922

During his first trip to Paris (1922), he met Tristan Tzara in person and grasped the liberating function and absurdist humour of Dadaism and its ability to devalue the traditional fetishes of civilisation. Another source of Hoffmeister's avant-garde works was Soviet Constructivism, which was promoted in Bohemia especially by Karel Teige. It replaced painting and sculpture with "utilitarian" disciplines such as photography and photomontage, engaged caricature, industrial design, typography, scenic art, fashion and architecture.

=== Likenesses ===
Hoffmeister began publishing his first cartoons in 1924 in Lidové noviny and from 1927 used them to illustrate his own texts published in books.

As a cartoonist, Hoffmeister had a developed sense of the dignity of man, reflecting the democratic traditions in which he grew up and whose roots he absorbed, not the socialist way of life to which he later subscribed, without accepting it wholeheartedly. In his work, caricature is neither a descriptive imitation nor a psychologizing introspective insight. He was always striving for simplicity and the attainment of an unchanging standard – a type that could be repeated at any time, and that emphasized generalizable qualities of character and physiognomy.

Hoffmeister's drawing style, based on delicate, economical and precise pen-drawing, emerged in a more or less definitive form between 1925 and 1927. He almost never used hatching, shading or laving, and had a pronounced aversion to the technique of brush drawing. Hoffmeister's earliest cartoons (1924–1925) show that once he found an adequate artistic expression, he did not change it later. The basic technique was linear ink drawing, sometimes supplemented by collage after 1928. The drawing was spare, economical, expressive, concise, purist and disciplined (Masaryk by One Stroke, 1936). Although the influence of poetism and surrealism is evident in the drawings, they are more parallel to constructivism and functionalism. According to Hoffmeister's own aphorism, "A drawing is at once a poem, a telegram and an architectural construction."

Hoffmeister's cartoons, with the exception of political ones during the Second World War, are rarely mocking and merge with generalized portrait drawing. His drawing of the " Friday gathering" and his portraits of T.G. Masaryk are well known.

The most important and numerous component of his work are the Likenesses (Visages), which were created over a span of more than half a century, first as stenographic sketches based on a live model, usually taken during a conversation. Hoffmeister uses the standard techniques of caricature, such as exaggeration, abbreviation, distortion, or highlighting characteristic details to get at a deeper truth. He strips public figures of the nimbus of revered geniuses and depicts them in civilian or comic situations that humanize them. The definitive portrait emerges as a reconstruction of the model's mental and physical form by emphasizing the characteristic details and suppressing the extraneous. If certain personalities are repeatedly returned to, the body or life situation may undergo surprising transformations, but the facial form remains almost constant. This is how, for example, Hoffmeister's portrait of G. K. Chesterton – from a lovable, funny fat man at a desk full of scattered papers transformed to a comic apostle of Catholicism and traveller, depicted as a floating balloon with a cross in the middle of his forehead.

Hoffmeister's first small exhibition of drawings at the publisher Fromek in 1927 attracted such attention that he was soon given the opportunity to exhibit at the Mánes Gallery and was accepted as a full member of the Mánes Union of Fine Arts. The following year he exhibited at the Galerie d'Art contemporain in Paris and, after favourable reviews in the foreign press, began to print his drawings in some French periodicals. In 1929, the spokesman for Devětsil, Karel Teige, wrote an introduction to the catalogue for an exhibition of his drawings in the Aventine Mansard, recognizing them as a legitimate part of Czech avant-garde art. The following year, the publisher Otakar Štorch-Marien commissioned him to interview and draw important cultural figures for the magazine Rozpravy Aventina. This resulted in portraits of Tzara, Joyce, Le Corbusier, Valéry, Meyer, Piscator, Lunacharsky and others.

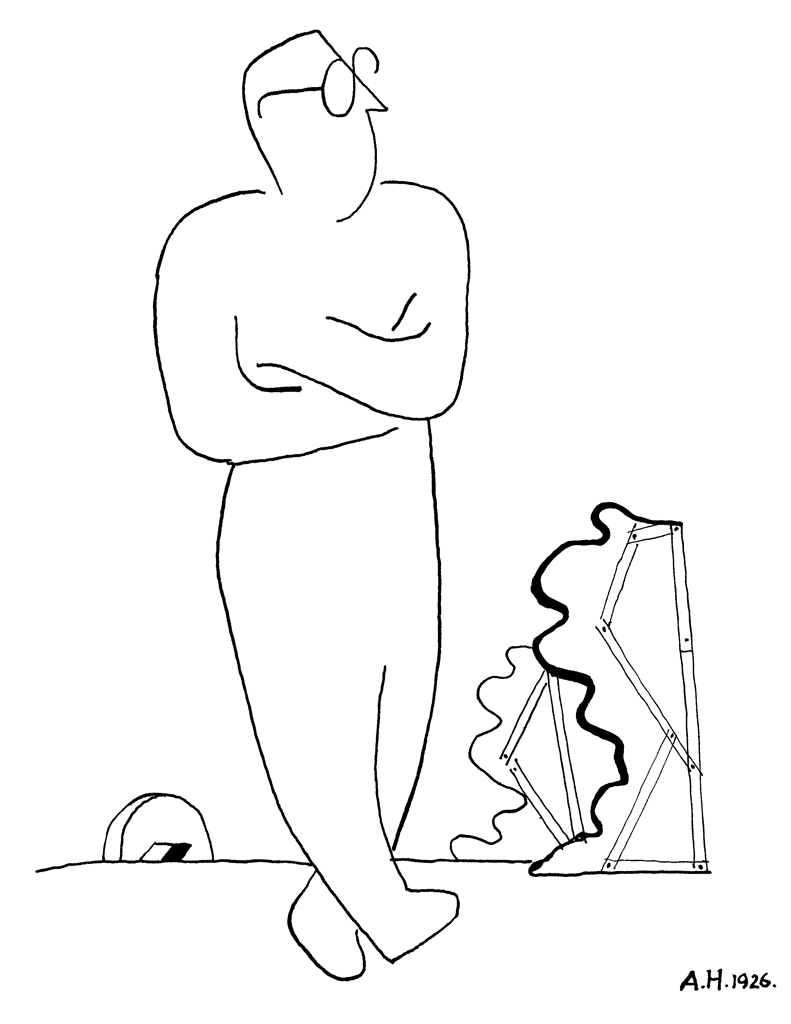
Adolf Hoffmeister, Josef Čapek, 1924

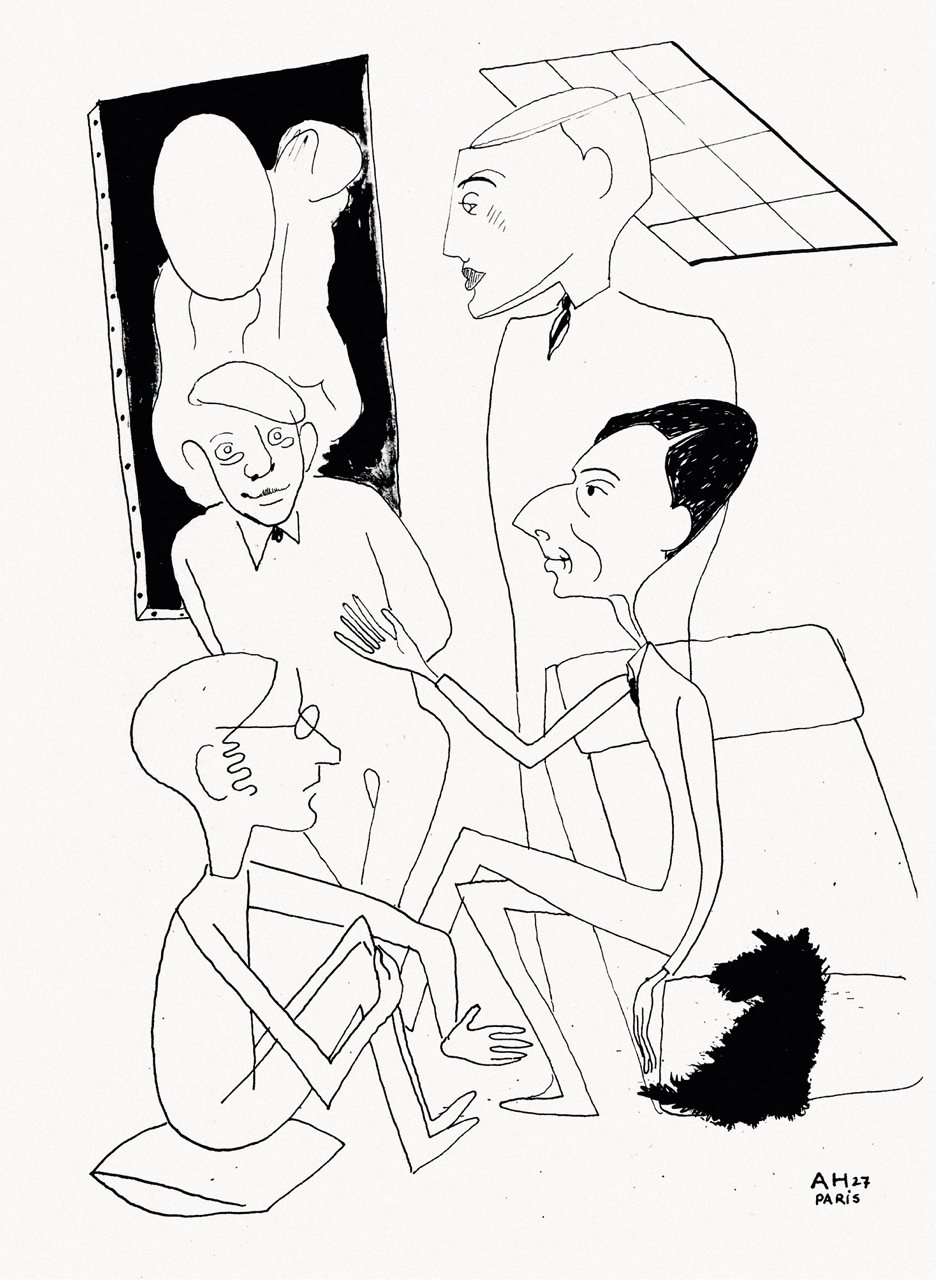
Adolf Hoffmeister, Meeting of Le Grand Jeu group in Josef Šíma's studio (R. Daumal, A. Harfaux, R. Gilbert-Lecomte, R. Vailand), 1927

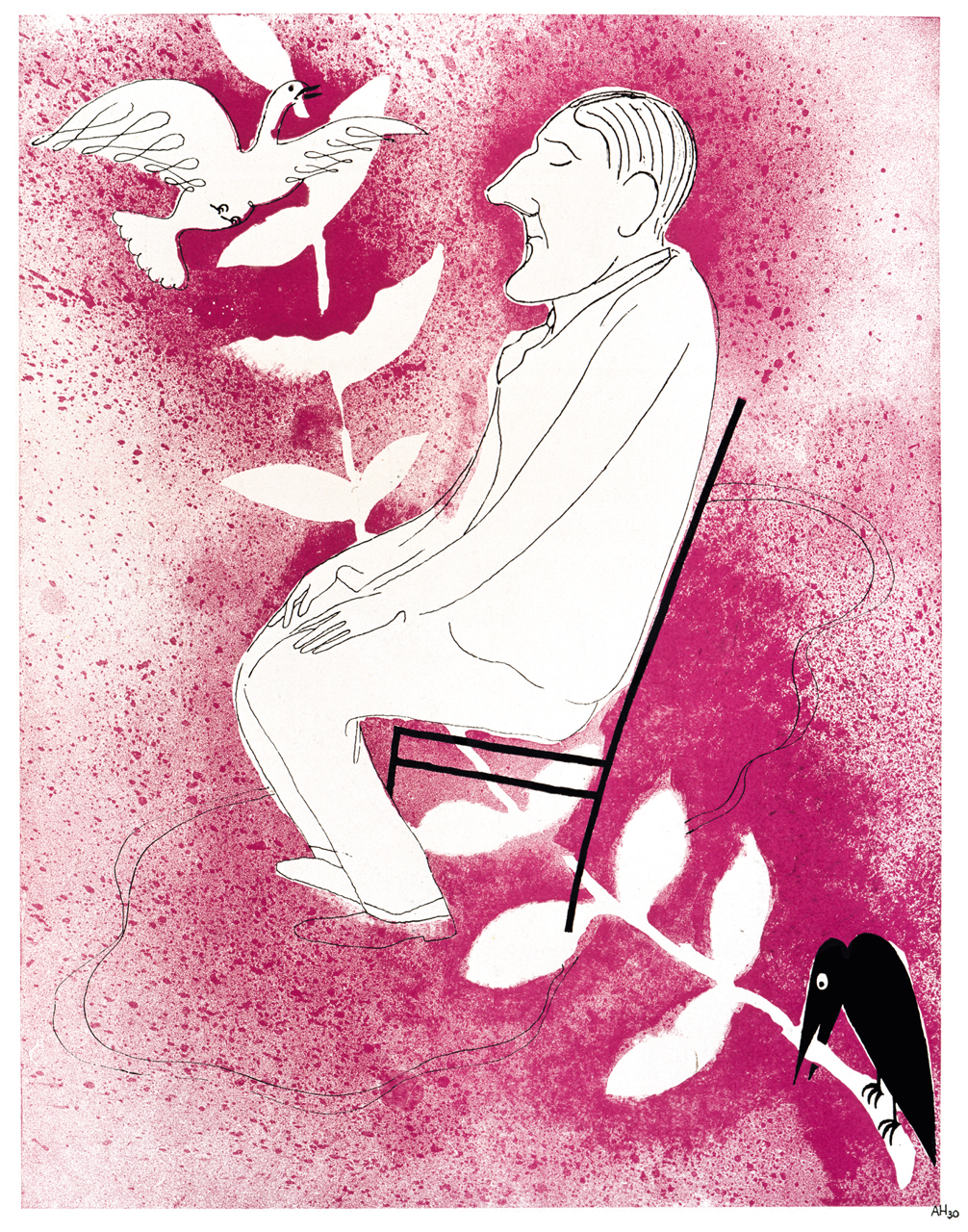
Adolf Hoffmeister, Jindřich Štyrský, 1930

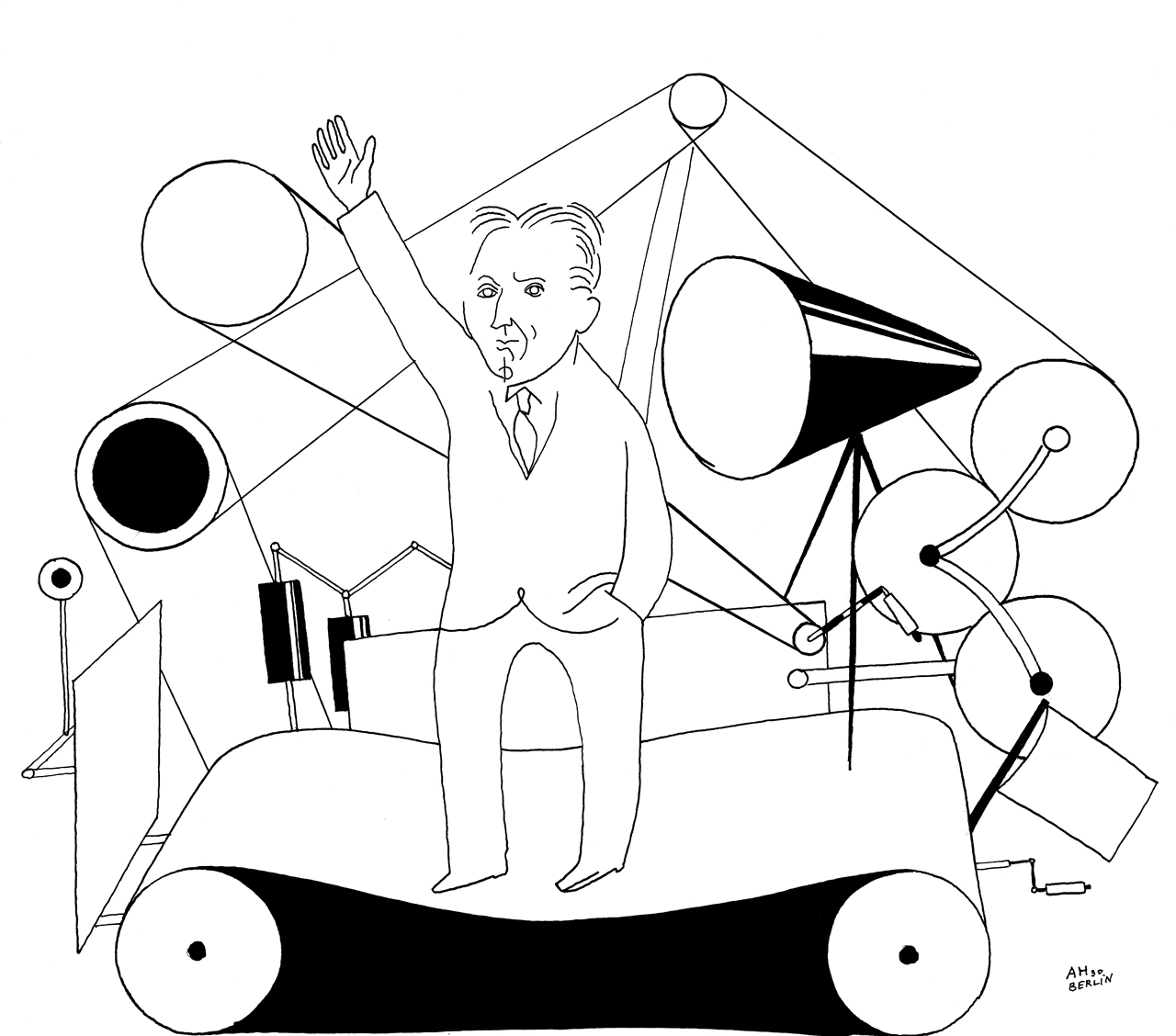
Adolf Hoffmeister, Erwin Piscator, 1930

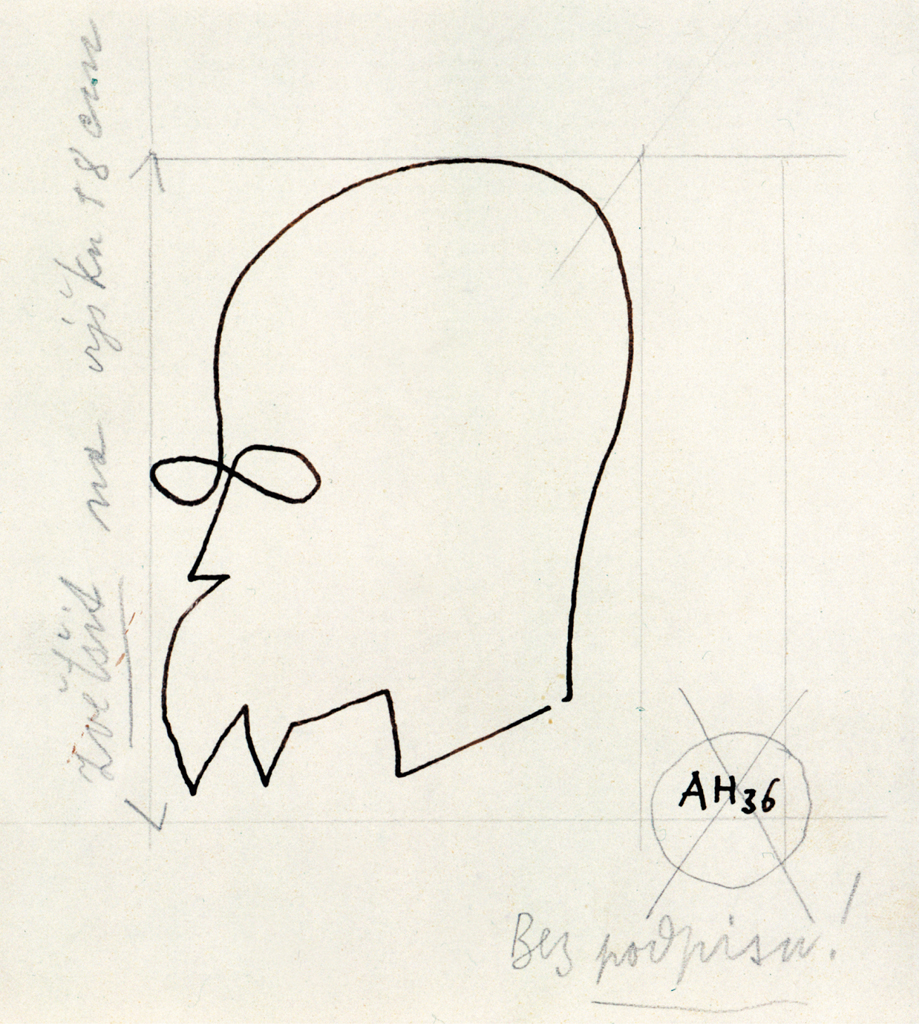
Adolf Hoffmeister, Masaryk by One Stroke, 1936

Hoffmeister's likenesses were created in parallel with his other works throughout his life. In the 1960s, he again drew personalities he had known before the war (Josef Šíma, Pablo Picasso, Salvador Dalí, Louis Aragon, etc. ), and also new faces he caught during his travels abroad at UNESCO congresses or conferences (Fernand Léger, Alberto Giacometti, Ernest Hemingway, John Steinbeck, Ray Bradbury, Oskar Kokoschka, etc.) The style of the portraits varies, however, and Hoffmeister more often adds collage or coloured areas. His pen-and-ink drawings are also characterized by a stronger geometric stylization of forms. Physiognomic features are depicted with great draughtsmanship as intersecting straight lines and curves, but the result is a vivid personality of the sitter (James Joyce, 1966, Dylan Thomas, 1966).

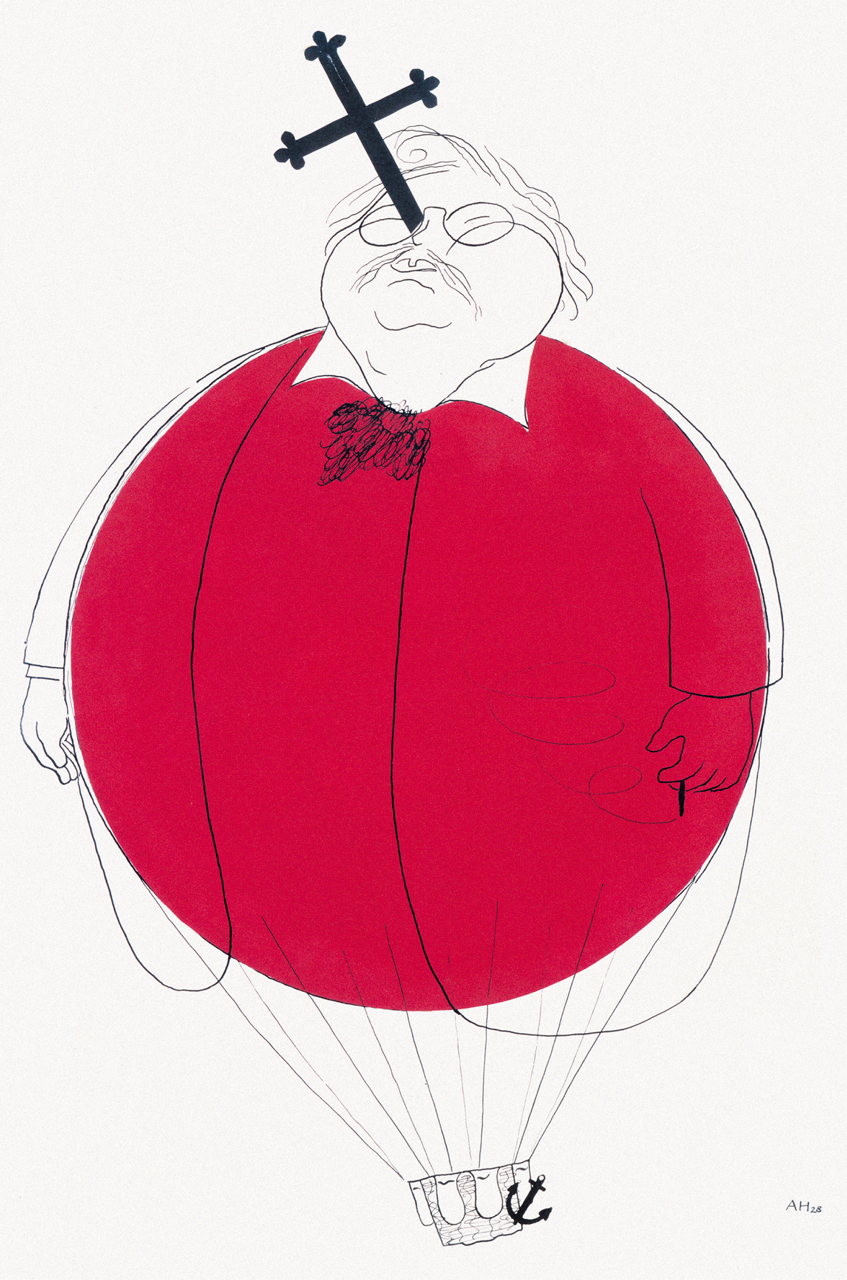
Adolf Hoffmeister, Ball and Cross, G. K. Chesterton, 1928

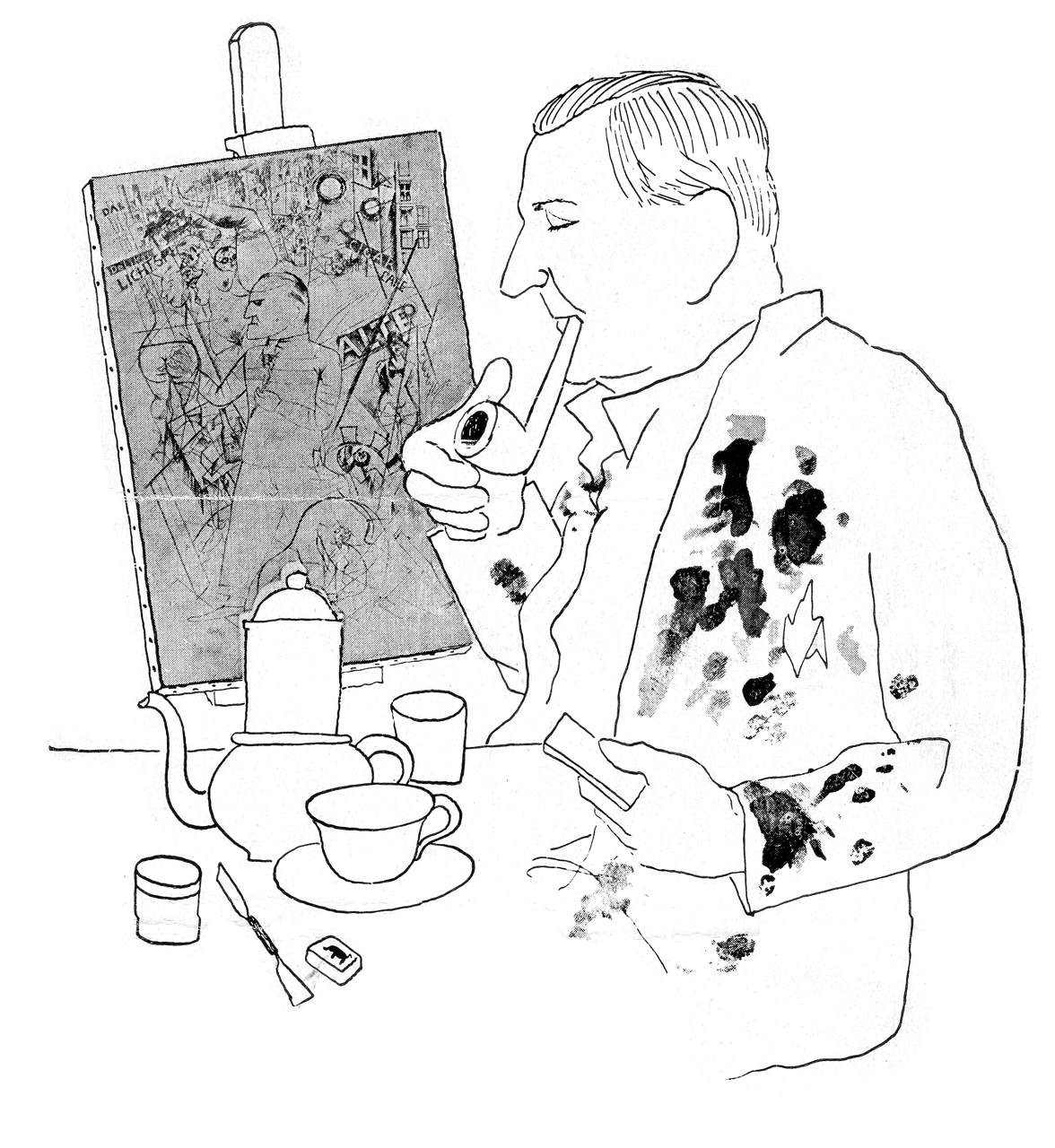
Adolf Hoffmeister, George Grosz, 1930

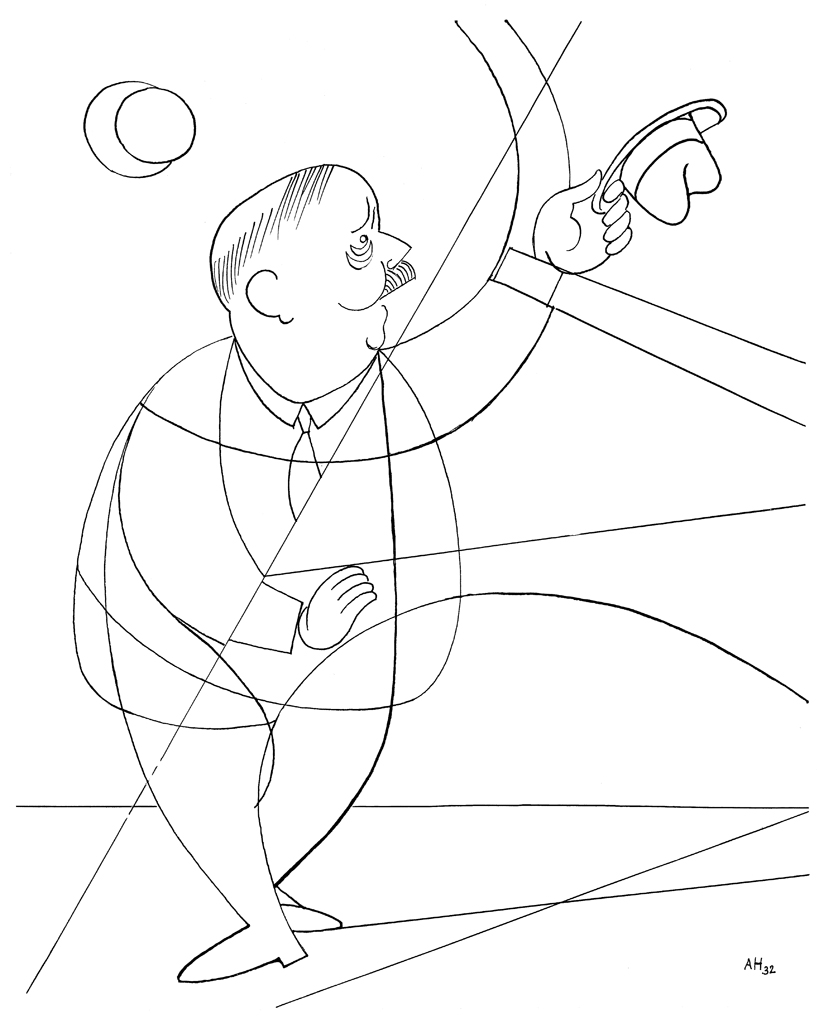
Adolf Hoffmeister, H. G. Wells, 1932

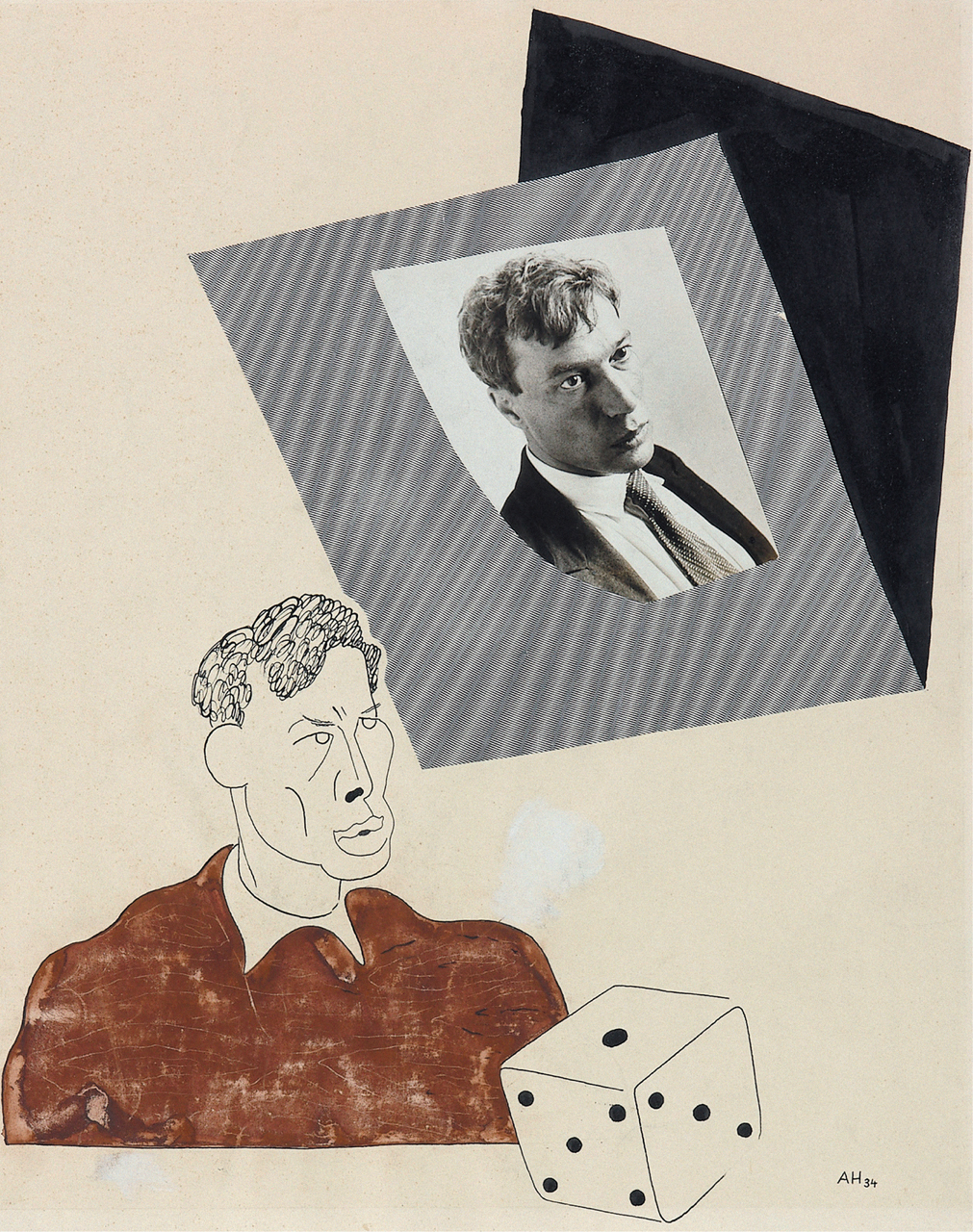
Adolf Hoffmeister, Boris Pasternak, 1934

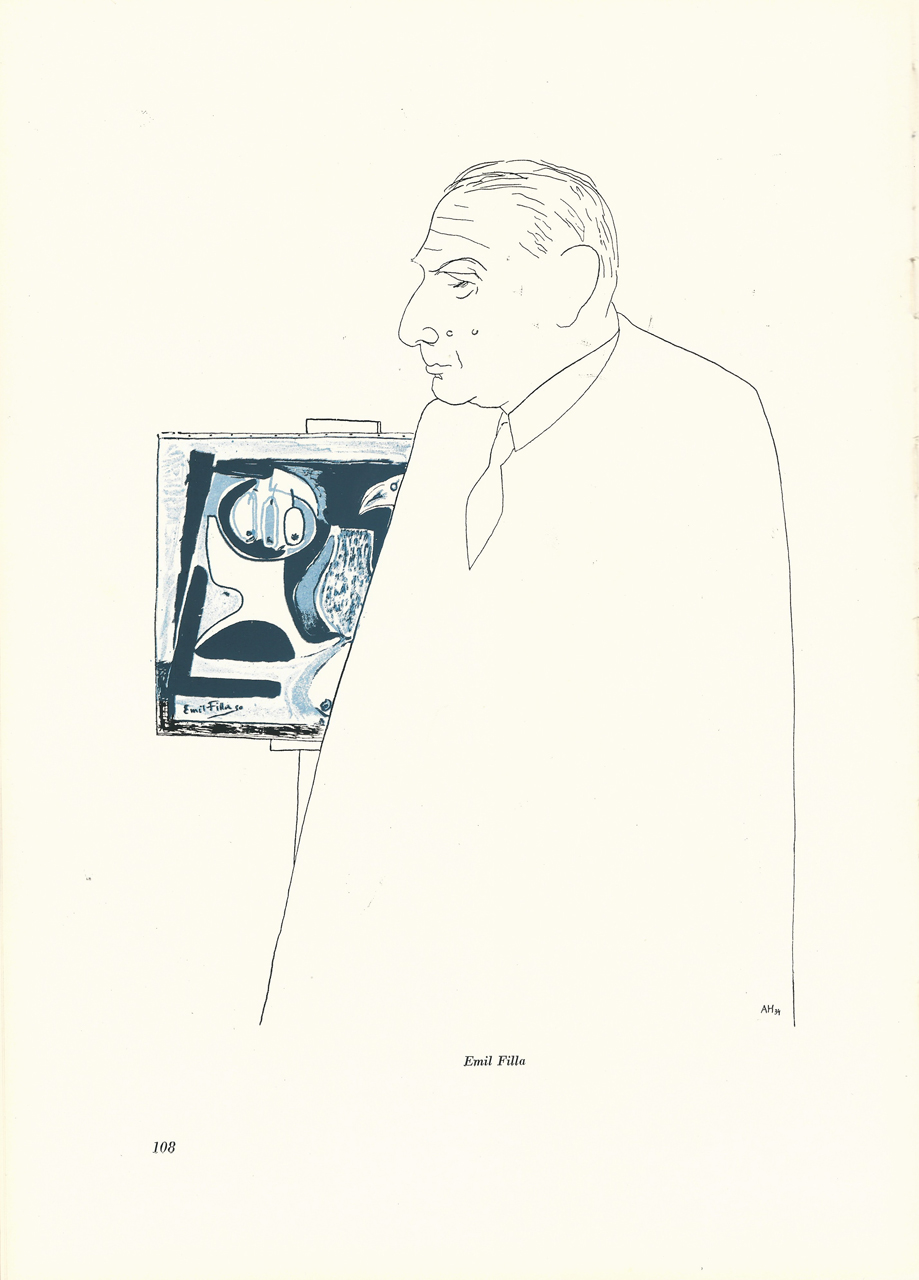
Adolf Hoffmeister, Emil Filla, 1934

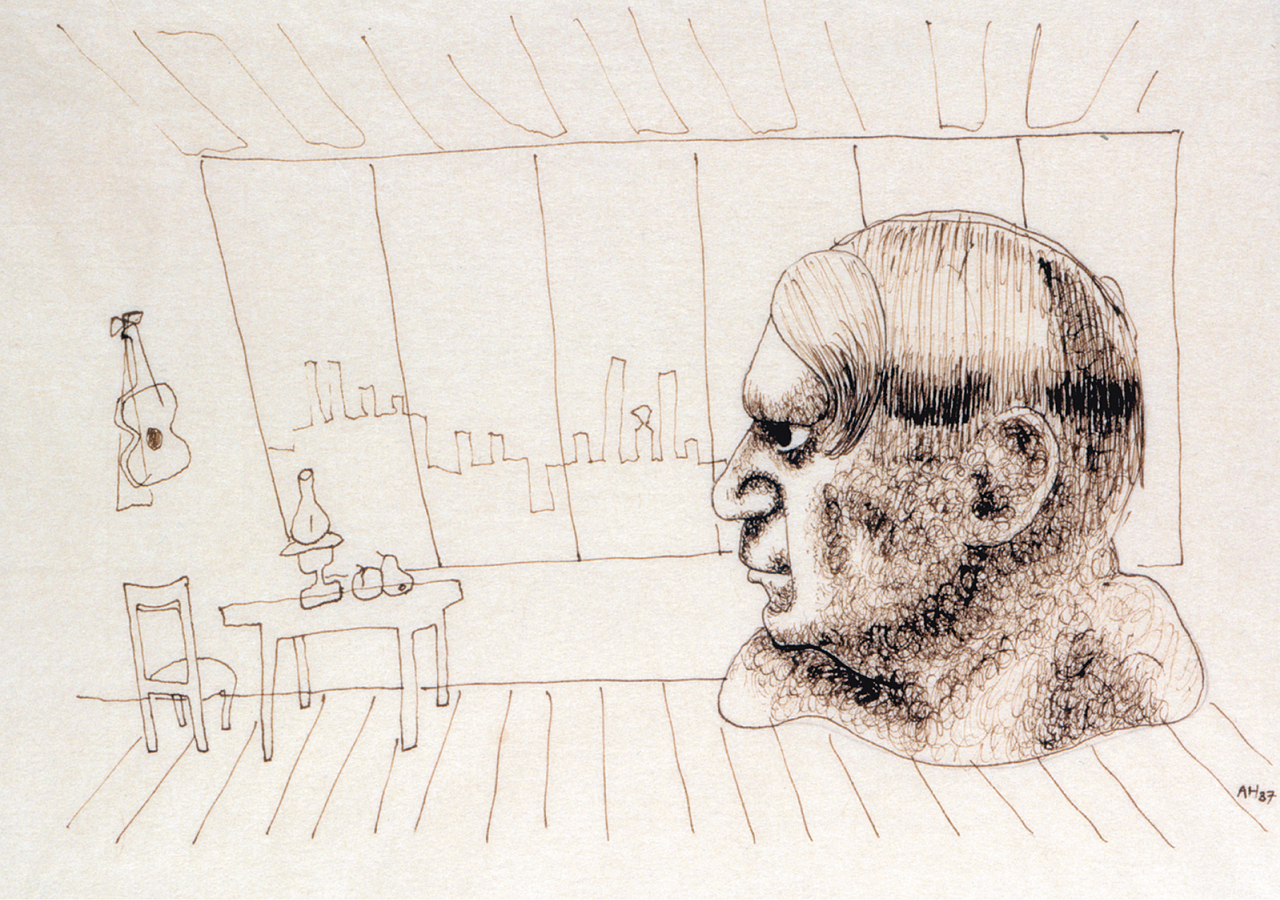
Adolf Hoffmeister, Pablo Picasso, 1937 - National Gallery Prague

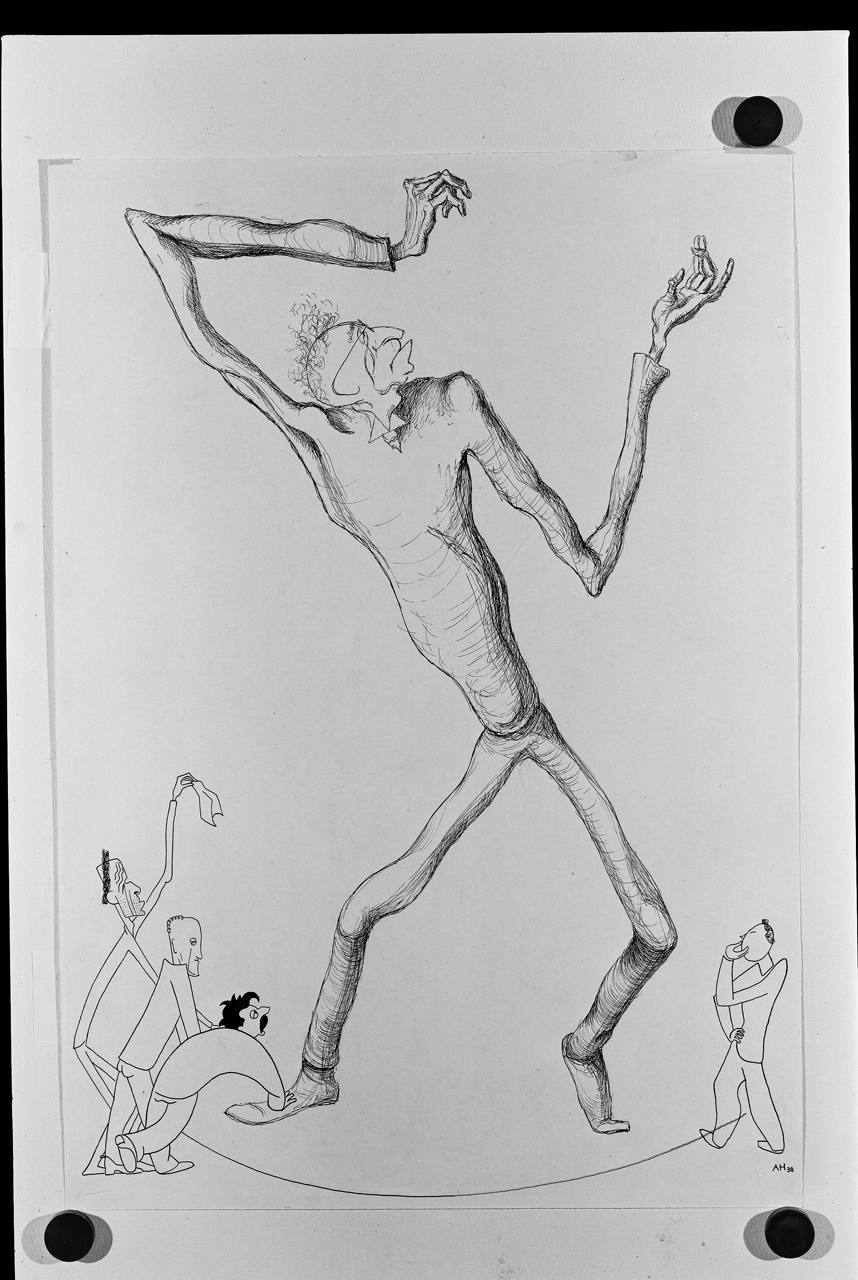
Adolf Hoffmeister, Vsevolod Meyerhold and his Czech admirers, 1938

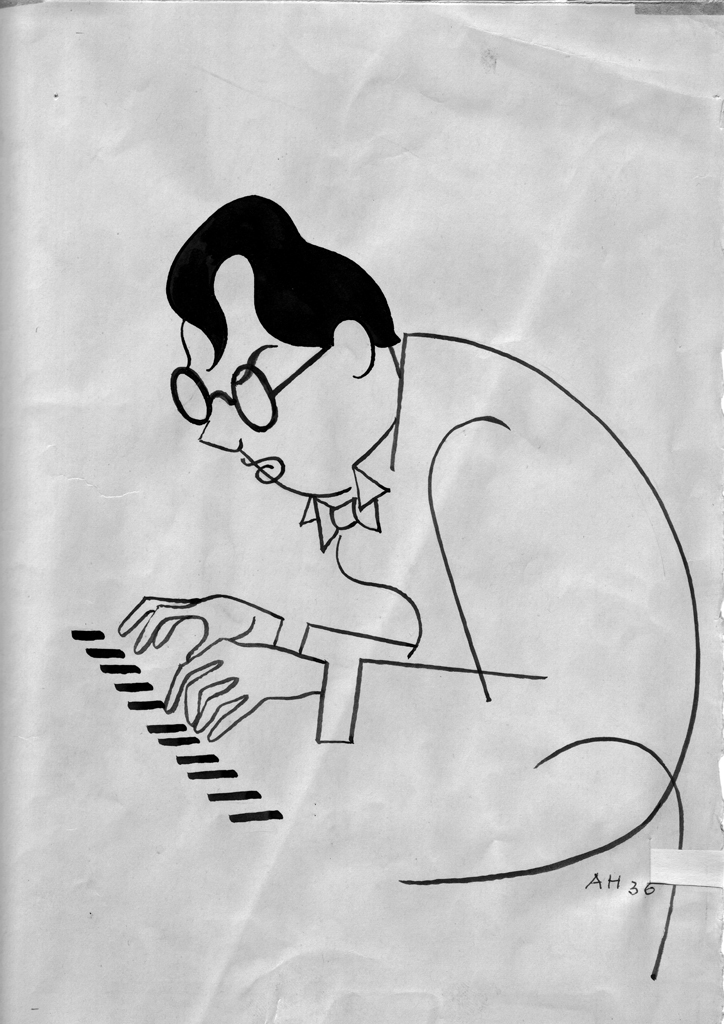
Adolf Hoffmeister, Jaroslav Ježek, 1936

Hoffmeister was already in contact with Prague Germans in his twenties and knew Franz Kafka and his surroundings from his early youth. However, his Kafka cycle was not created until 40 years after the writer's death, during the gradual rehabilitation of his work in the 1960s. Between 1963 and 1973 he produced a series of imaginary portraits of Franz Kafka, comprising several dozen drawings and collages, which became the last part and the culmination of his portrait work (FK, Proposal for a Postage Stamp, 1967) The Kafka series also reflected the actual political situation and the occupation in August 1968 – as a collage with Kafka and the menacing skeleton claws over Prague (Franz Kafka – Still Threatened Prague, 1968).

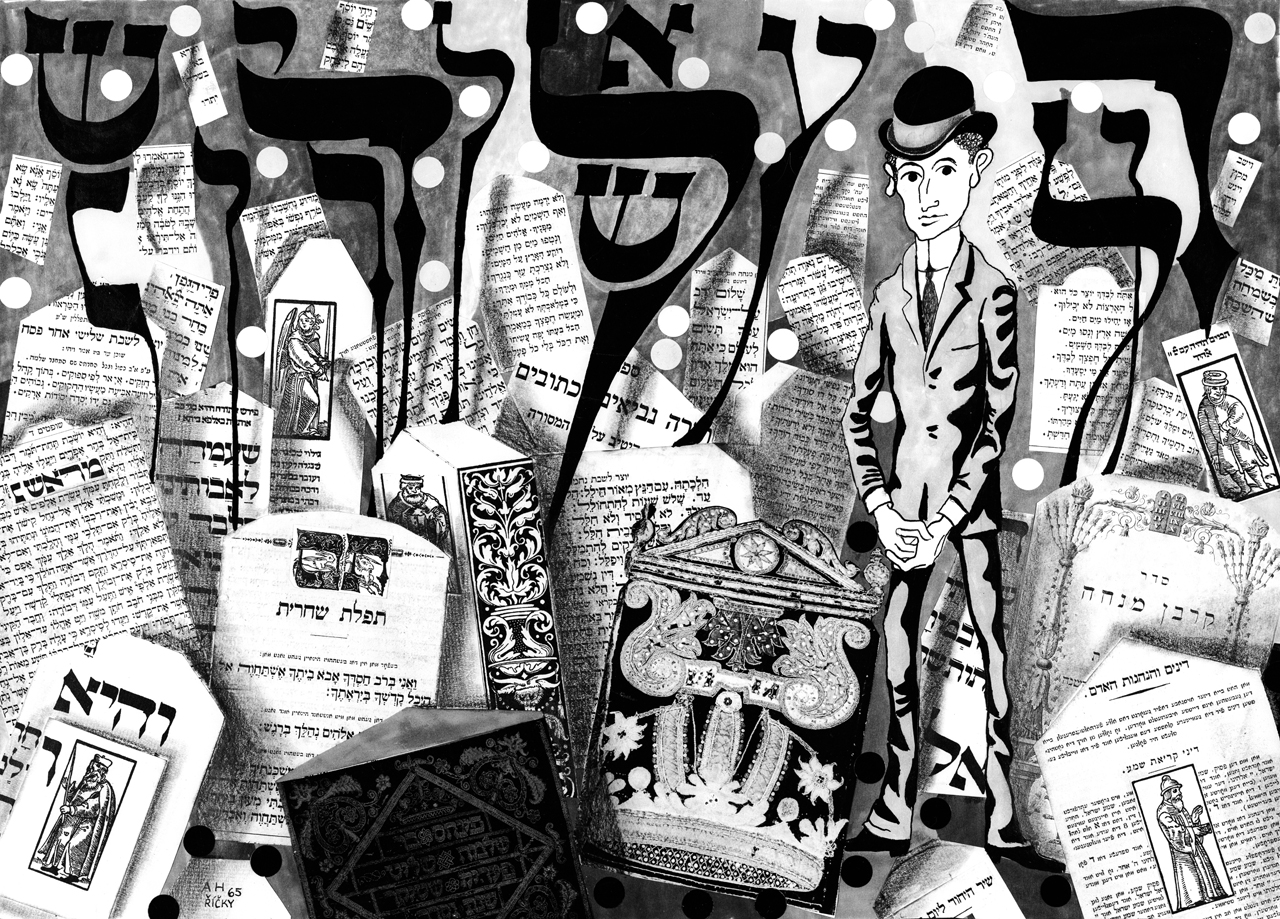
Adolf Hoffmeister, Franz Kafka in the old Jewish cemetery, 1965

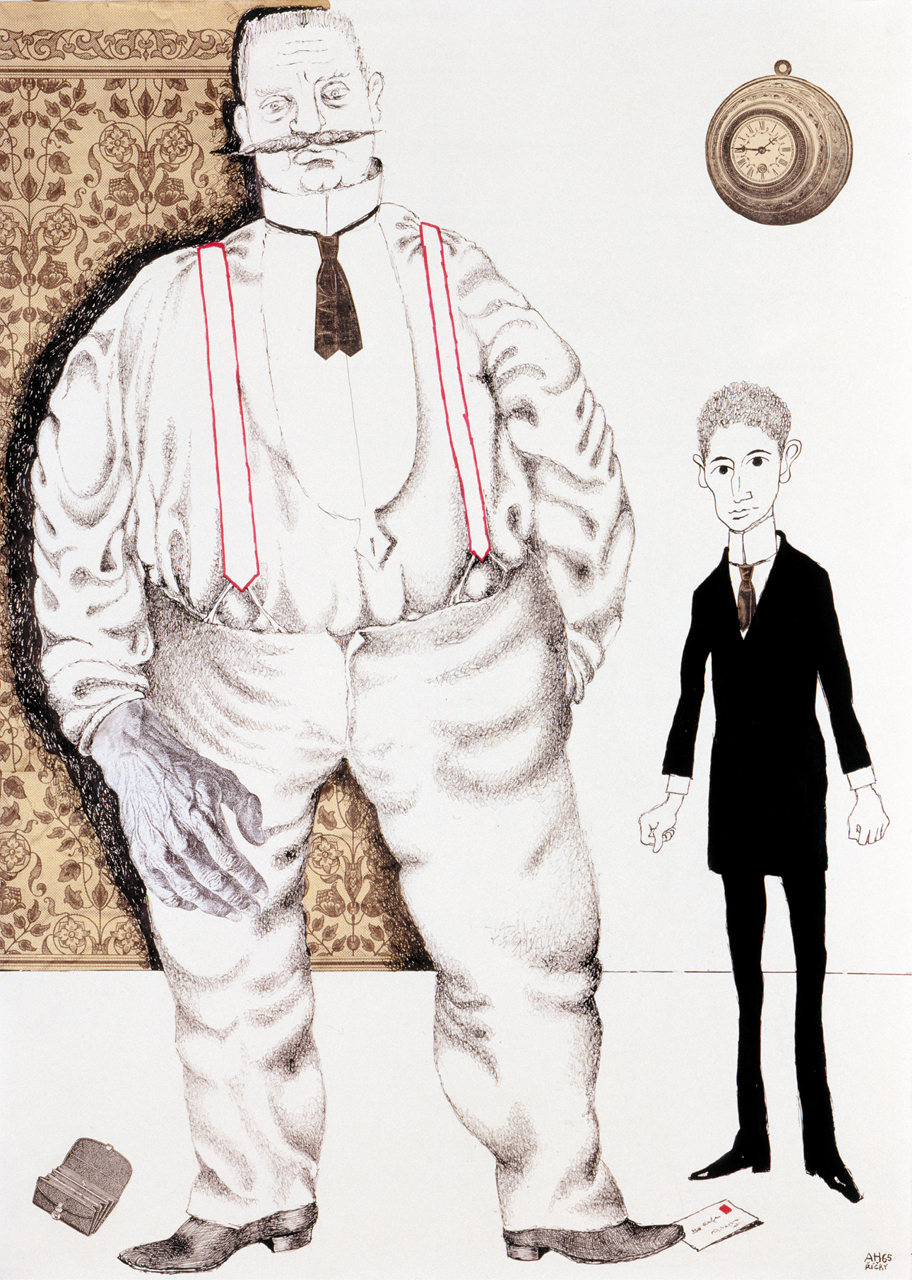
Adolf Hoffmeister, Franz Kafka - Letter to his father, 1965

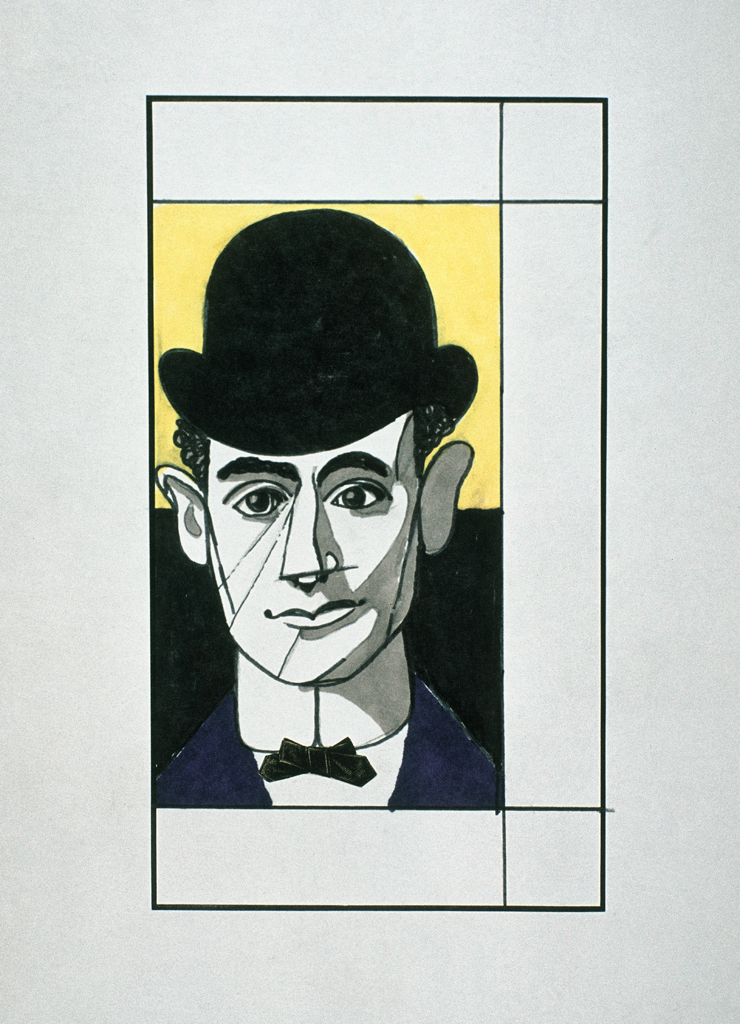
Adolf Hoffmeister, Franz Kafka (stamp design), 1967

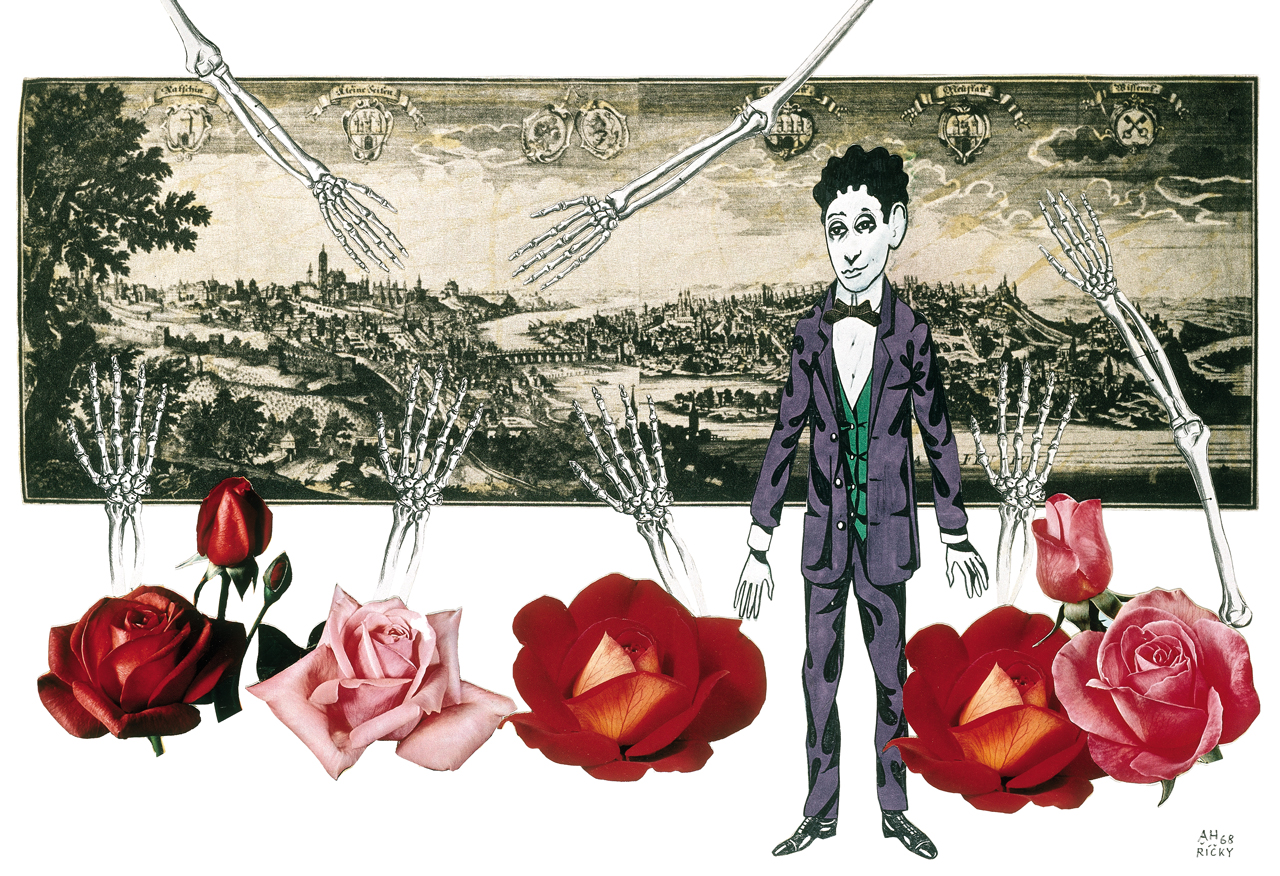
Adolf Hoffmeister, Franz Kafka - Still threatened Prague, 1968

=== Scenic design ===
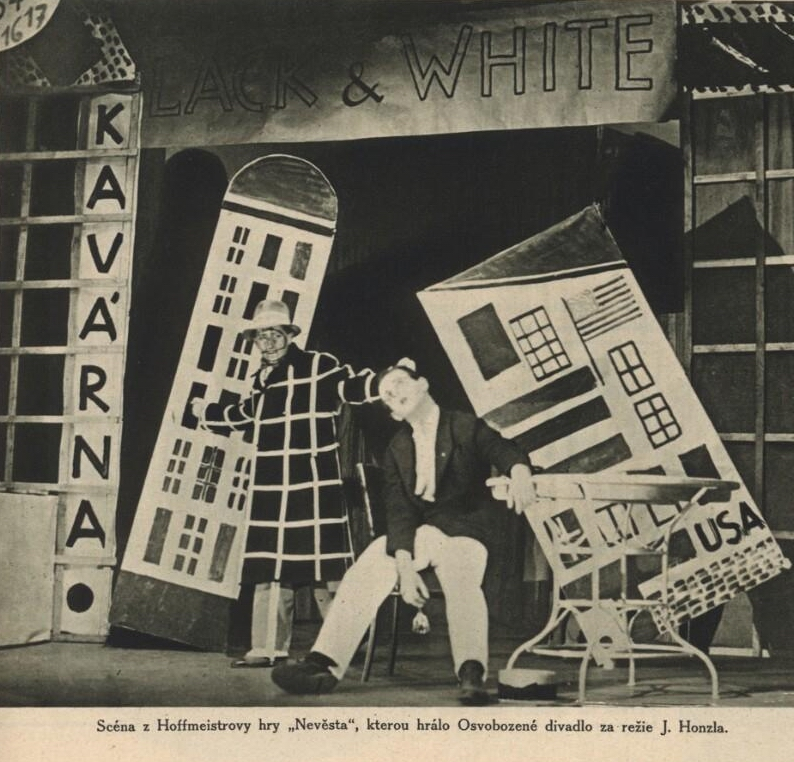
Hoffmeister stage design for The Bride (1927)

In 1926, the Osvobozené divadlo (Liberated Theatre) was founded on the grounds of the Devětsil as its theatre section. From the beginning Hoffmeister participated in its programme as author (The Bride, 1927) and co-author of plays (The World Behind Bars, 1935) and especially as cartoonist and set designer (Caesar, 1932, Reverse and Obverse, 1936). Voskovec and Werich's writing gradually changed from pure humour and absurdist Dadaist comedy to anti-fascist comedies in the late 1930s, and Hoffmeister's stage design changed along with it (Map of Europe for the play Reverse and Obverse).

=== Surrealist painting ===
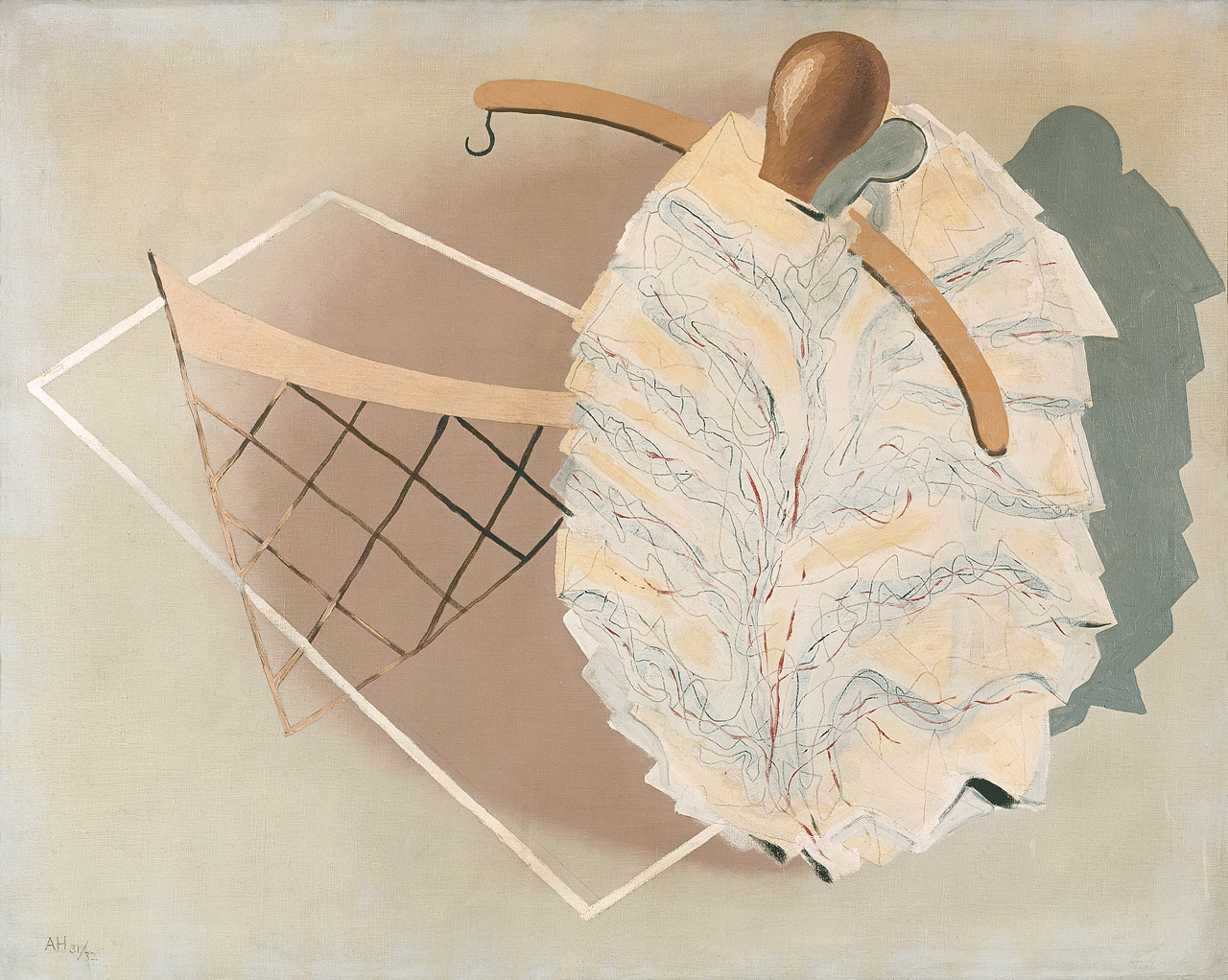
Adolf Hoffmeister, A fever dream, 1931–32

In the early 1930s, influenced by Surrealism, Hoffmeister briefly returned to painting (A Fever Dream, 1931–1932) and participated in the important 1932 Poetry exhibition at the Mánes, where the Paris Surrealist group was also represented. However, he did not become a member of the Prague Surrealist group (founded in 1934). Hoffmeister continued to uncompromisingly defend freedom and the principles of modern art even in the pre-war left-wing environment, and in 1937 he took part in the Exhibition of the Czechoslovak Avant-Garde in Burian's Theatre D 37.

=== Political caricature ===
Influenced by world events, he returned to drawing before the mid-1930s and began to devote himself mainly to political caricature. In Prague, he collaborated mainly with the magazine Simplicus (later Simpl, 1934–1935) and after being forced to emigrate to the USA, he drew for Compatriot and American newspapers. In American exile, where he created his best cartoons (Tehran Conference, 1943, the series Anti-Axis Algebra, 1943), he had a solo exhibition with Antonín Pelc at the Museum of Modern Art in New York City at the end of the war.

=== Illustration ===
In the 1950s, travelogues with his own illustrations became a major component of Hoffmeister's literary output. His Postcard from China (1953) was accompanied by more or less realistic pen drawings, but under the influence of Oriental calligraphy, his drawings abandoned the descriptive and took on a sign-like character. In Made in Japan (1958) the drawing is a free play of linear arabesques and contrasts of geometrically structured surfaces. In The View from the Pyramids (1957), collage was employed alongside further simplification and geometrization of the drawing, which then became his main artistic device.

He returned to illustration after 1970, when he created a large series of pictures for the book Alice's Surprise.

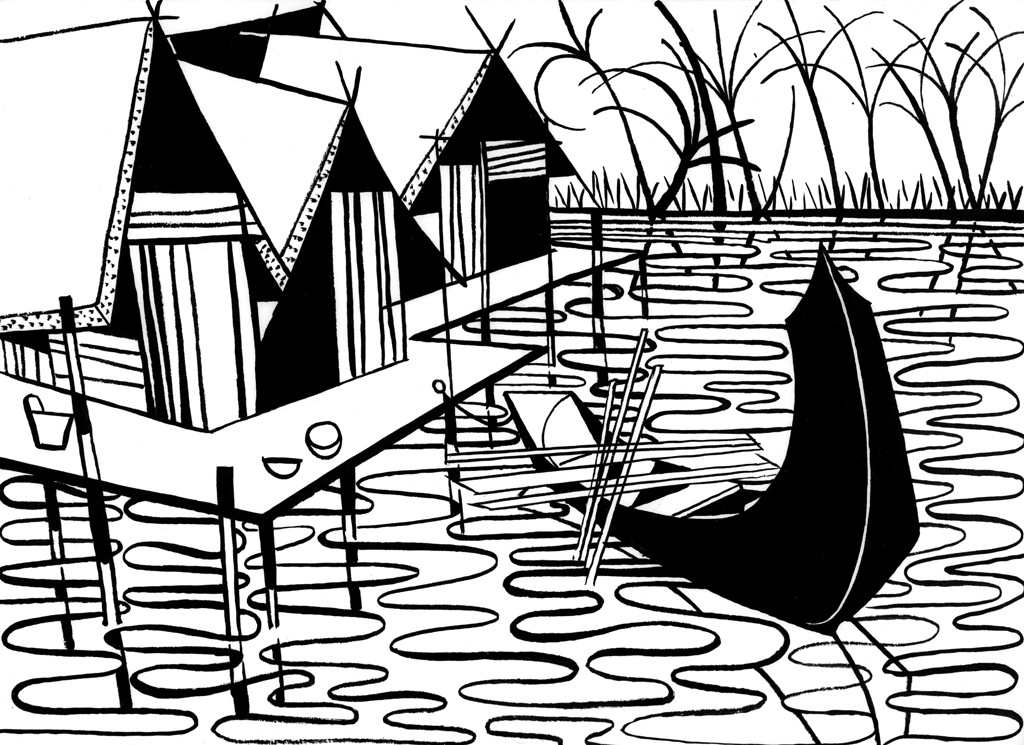
48. Adolf Hoffmeister, illustration Made in Japan, 1958

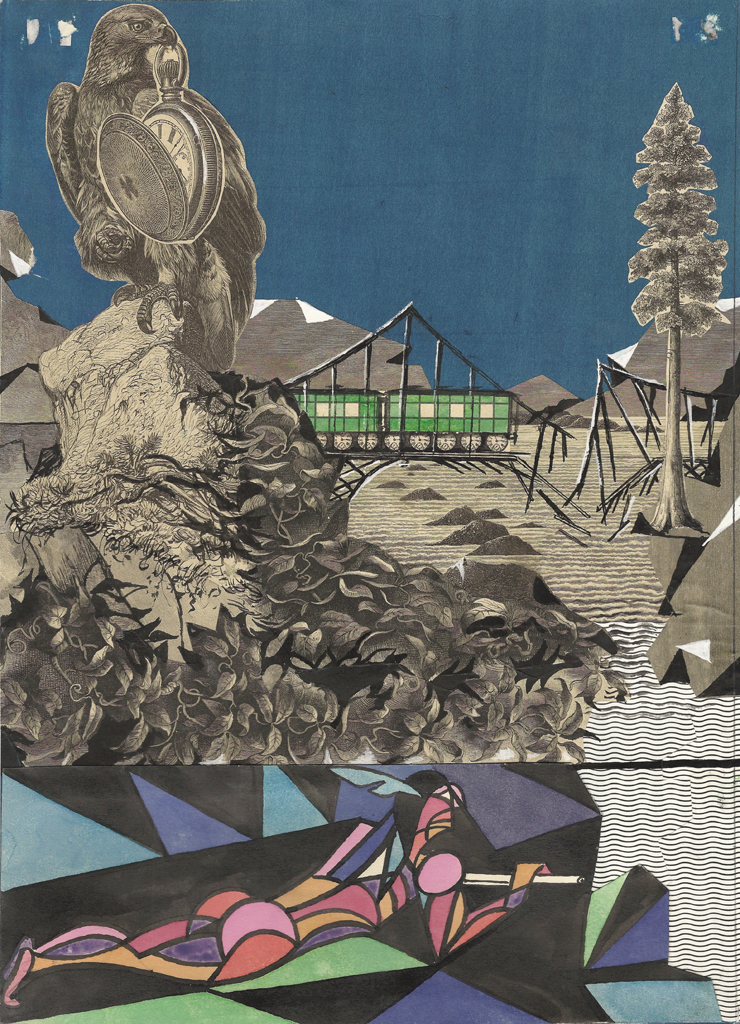
Adolf Hoffmeister, illustration for Verne's Around the World in 80 Days, 1959

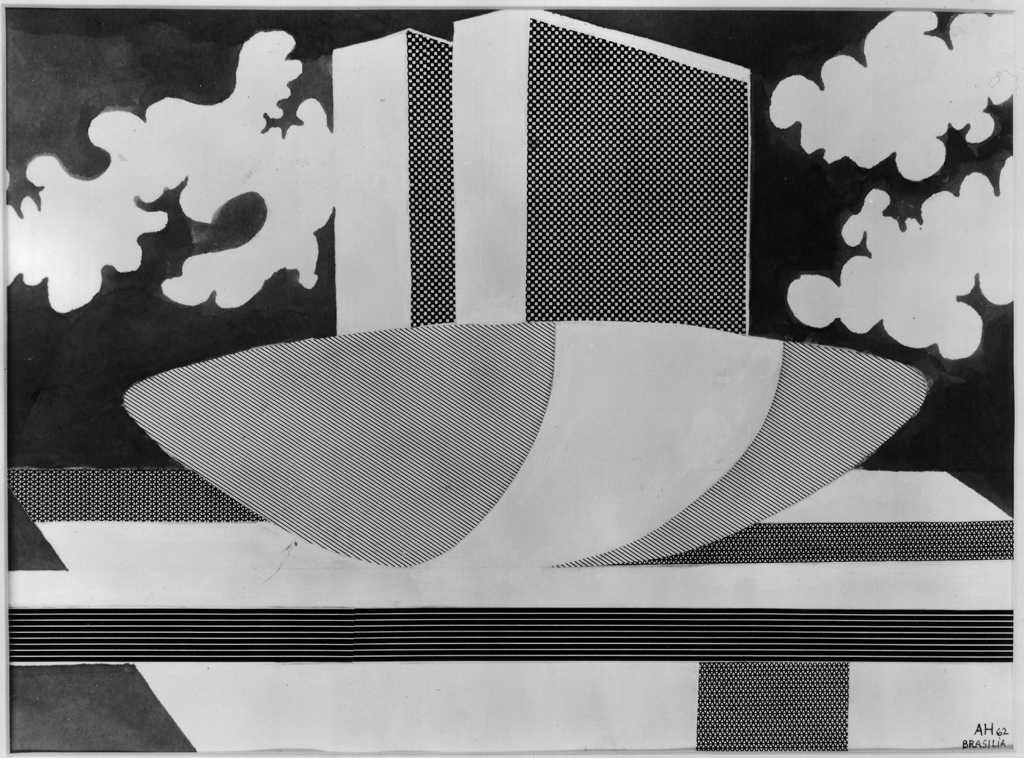
Adolf Hoffmeister, illustration Skyscrapers in the Rainforest, 1964

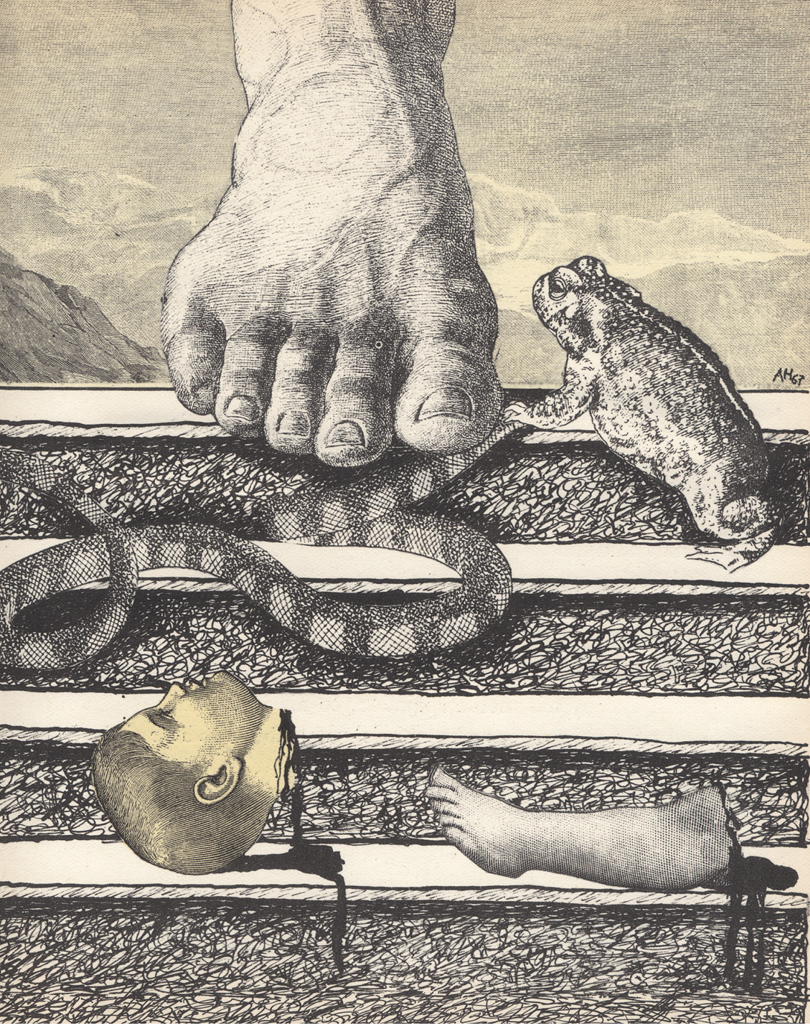
Adolf Hoffmeister, illustration, Lautréamont poetry, 1967

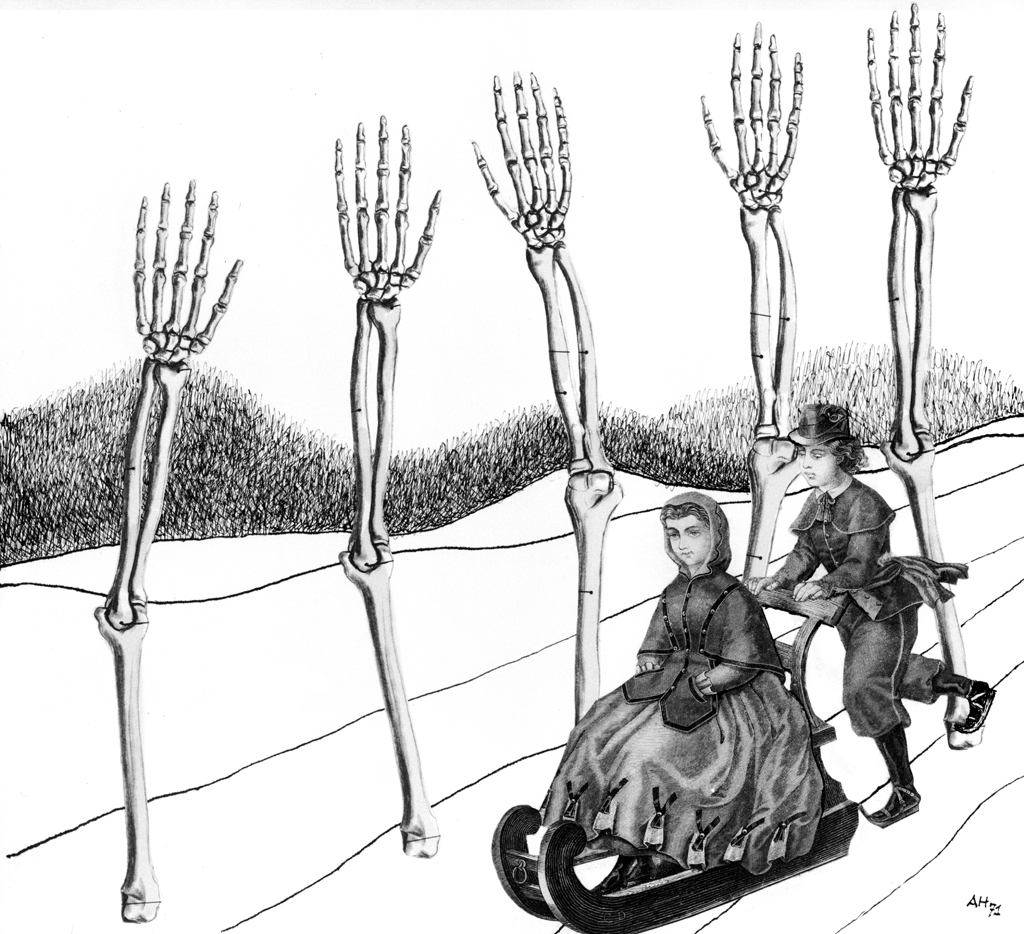
Adolf Hoffmeister, illustration of Alice's Surprise, 1971

=== Collages ===
A new direction in Hoffmeister's work in 1959 is represented by illustrations for his favourite childhood book, Around the World in Eighty Days, by which he attempted to update Jules Verne's book for contemporary readers. Alongside clippings of old-fashioned xylographic reproductions, tinged with humorous exaggeration and evoking a strange old-world charm, he applied his own drawings, which, through the use of geometric grids, coloured surfaces and spare literary signs, clearly refer to the interwar avant-garde. As a full counterpart to the image, the collages feature typographic compositions assembled from various types of fonts. Hoffmeister also seeks to rehabilitate the legacy of the Czech left-wing avant-garde, such as Devětsil or Surrealism and Dada, in his texts.

In his illustrations for the anthology of Western science fiction Labyrinth (1961) and Wells's First Men on the Moon (1963), he combined clippings from old prints and photographs with drawings (in the case of Wells, the drawings are inspired by František Hudeček's Nightwalker). He illustrated Cendrars's Gold (L'Or) (1964) with collaged frottage. His other illustrations are mostly collages with ink drawings (AH, Skyscrapers in the Rainforest, 1964, Lautréamont, Poetry, 1967, AH, Alice's Surprise, 1971–1973).

During his trip to Abkhazia (1959), he used the artistic potential of script as an independent element in his typographic collages and created the first of his "landscape sketchbooks" there. The calligraphic qualities of the Abkhazian script, which associated the shapes of the surrounding nature, gave the collages a dynamic movement, and the newspaper clippings with their unintelligible characters became abstract material to create a new concrete reality. However, the artist respected the certain semantic information of the typeface, and on subsequent trips abroad to Greece, Sicily or the Côte d'Azur, London and Montreal, he always used clippings from local newspapers and magazines. Drawing in these landscapes is limited to the outline and emphasis of spatial plans, composed according to the cubist principle (plans superposés). In addition to writing, Hoffmeister made use of many real elements of local architecture, advertising signs and abstract colour surfaces. In the collage Karlovy Vary (1961), where the echoes of Dadaism survive most strongly, the historicist style of spa colonnades is evoked by cut-outs from chessboards, dominoes or card games, set in ornamental frames. Hoffmeister's typographic landscapes include the large-scale series Old Jewish Cemetery in Prague (1963–1966), in which he reused drawing alongside the calligraphic quality of Hebrew script.

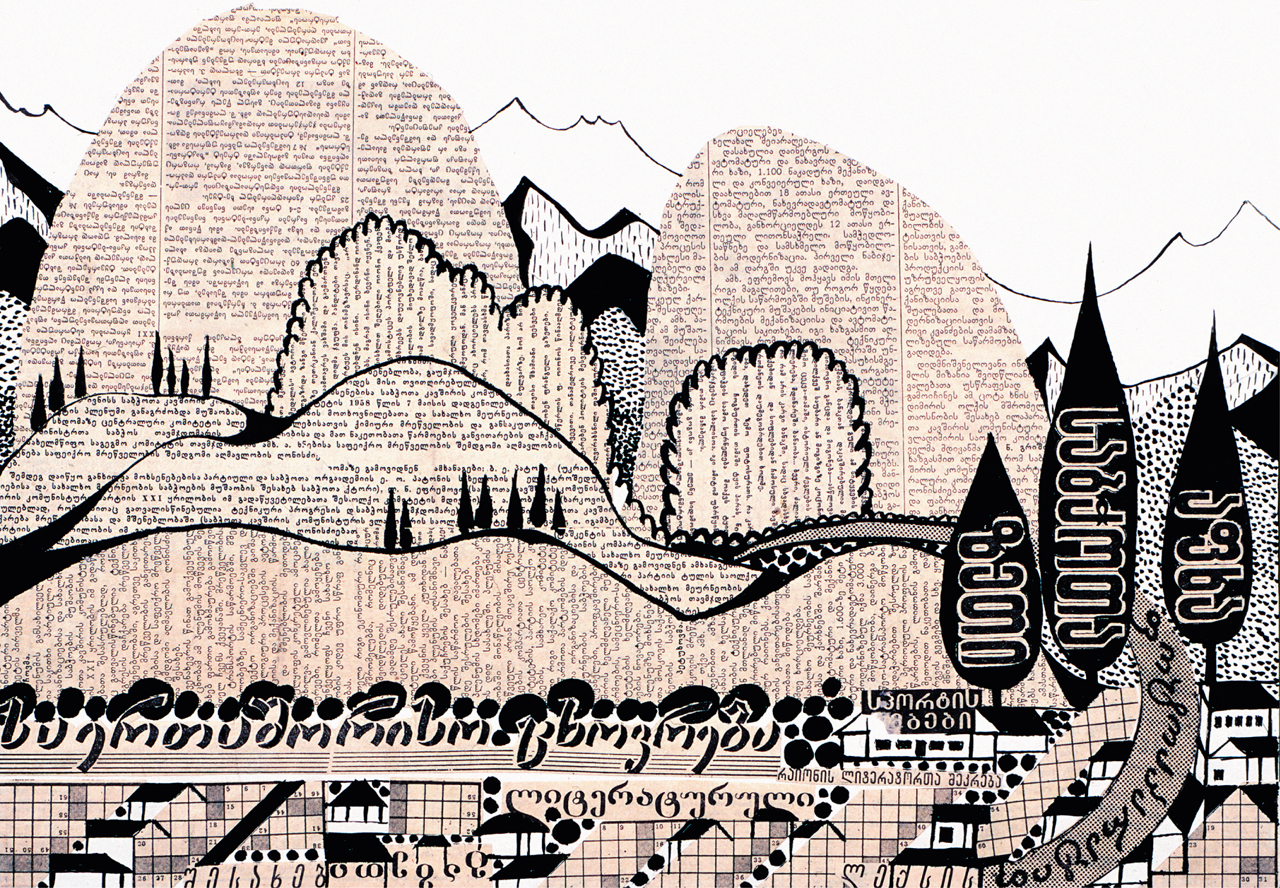
Adolf Hoffmeister, Abkhazian wine landscape on the coast, 1959

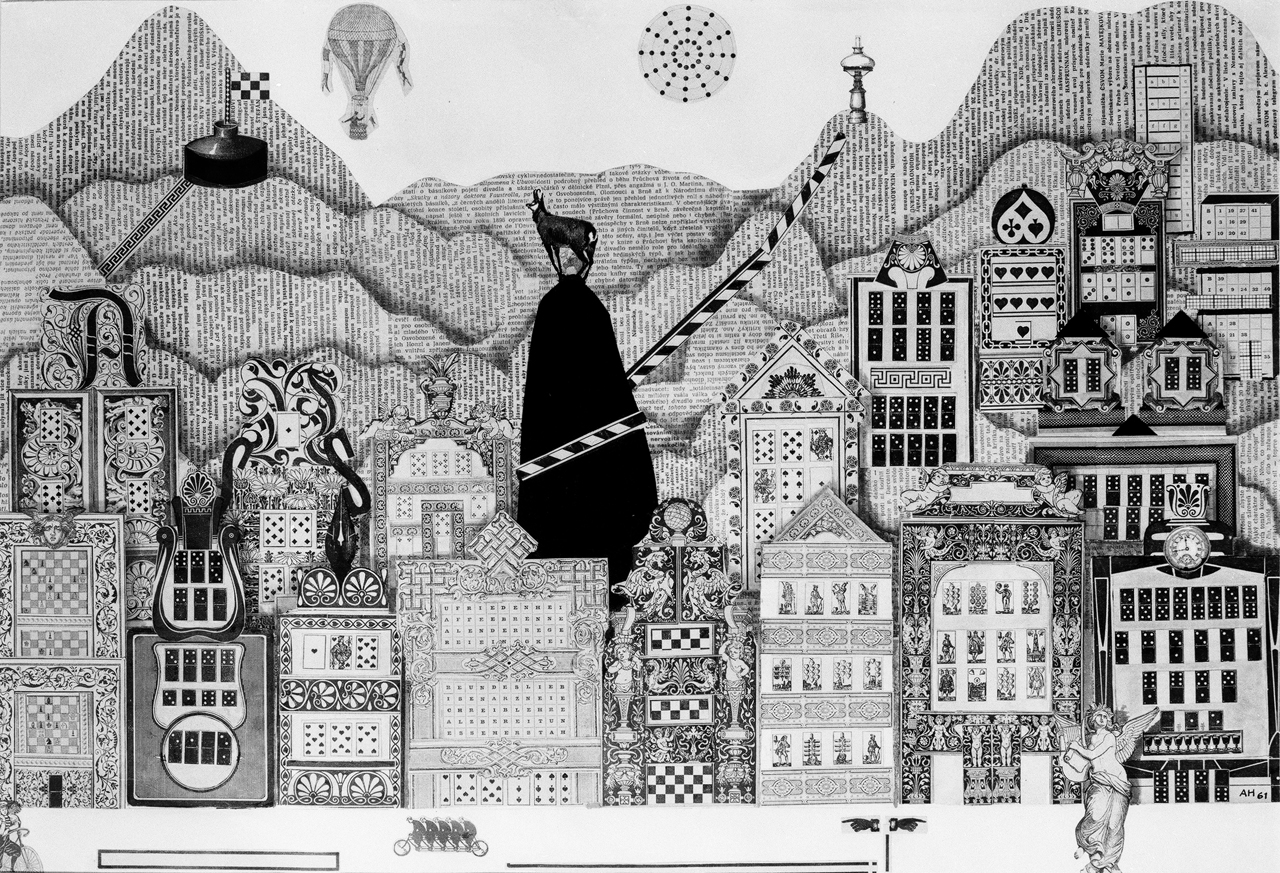
Adolf Hoffmeister, Karlovy Vary, 1961

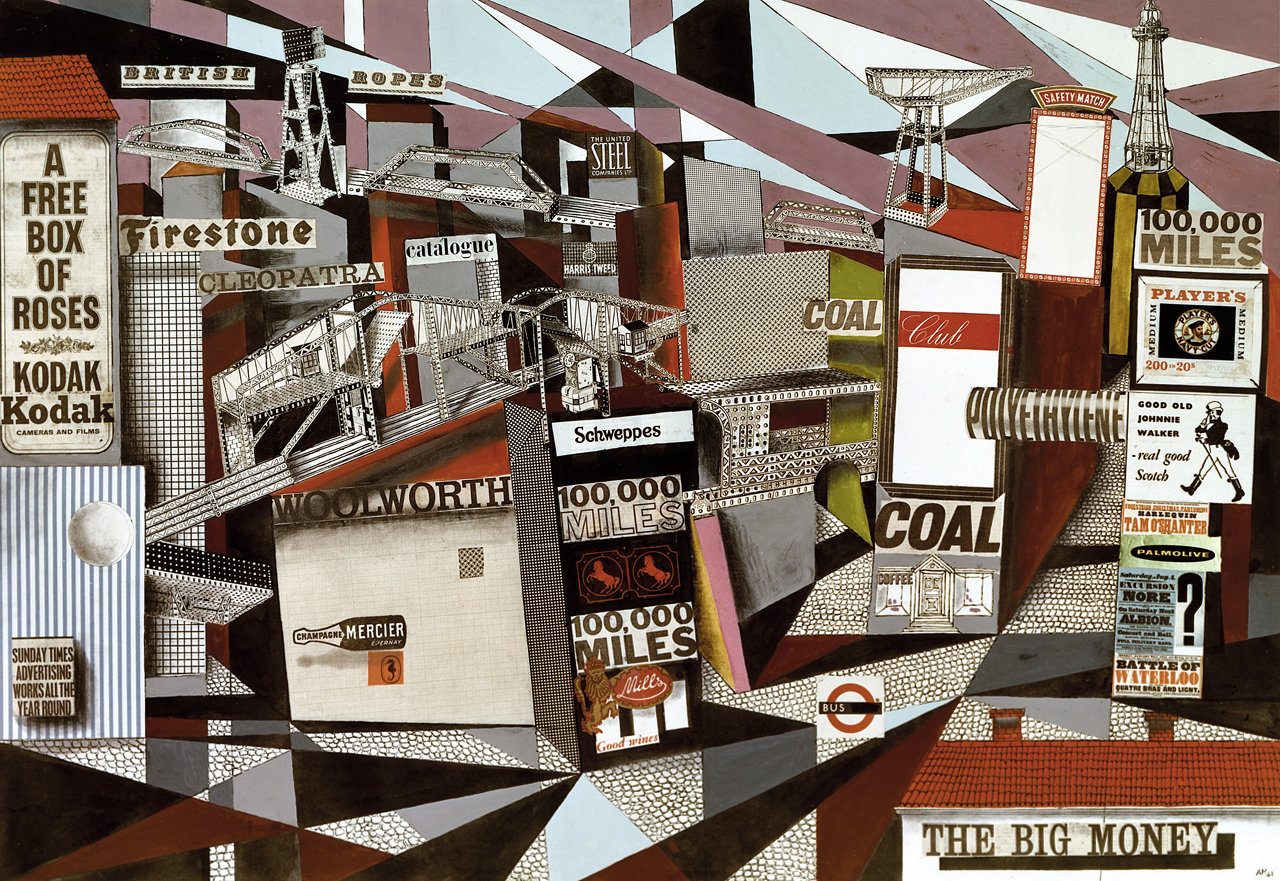
Adolf Hoffmeister, London Suburbs, 1963

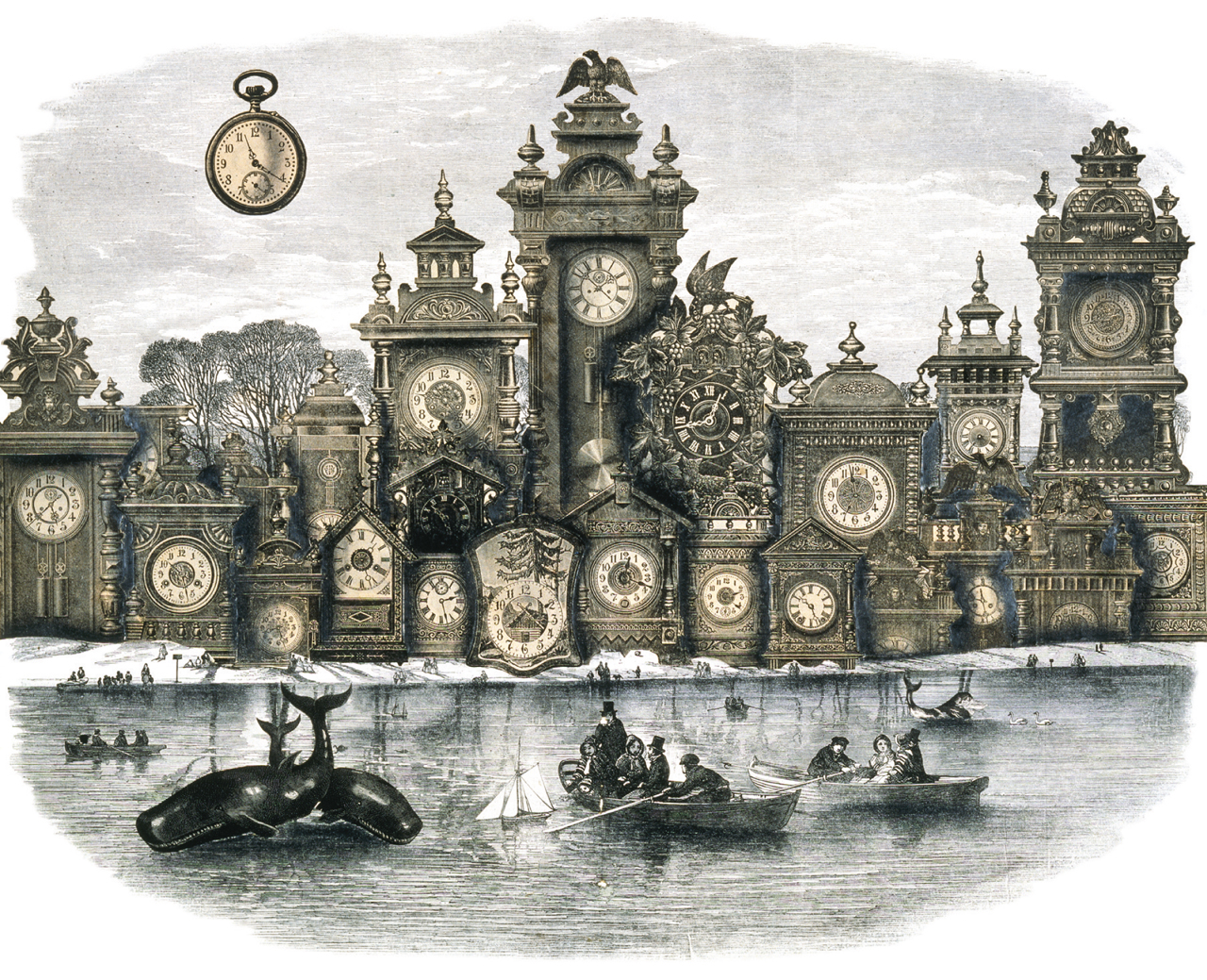
Adolf Hoffmeister, City of Lost Time, 1964

This work, which replaces the primary communicative function of writing with a visual function, was not just a passing amusement. Hoffmeister was well aware of the superiority of visual information over written text, and at the same time he reflected on his personal experience in the 1950s, when speech became a screen that obscured true reality and created a false reality, a semantic waste or a tool of misinformation, propaganda and lies. This has led to the justified scepticism that speech has ceased to be an instrument of knowledge, that its meaning is becoming empty and that writing is losing its meaning along with it. The new reality, created from fragments of devalued writing, becomes an image of a world full of newspaper phrases and advertising slogans. Between 1964 and 1967, he created typographic still lifes in which writing regained its communicative function, even though he composed words according to the principle of chance encounters. However, the cut-out words are tied to a common theme and thus form a visual poem. Other typographic still lifes from 1970 to 1971, in their iconography and oval shape, continue the legacy of Cubism, and the typeface is the material for the creation of bottles, jars or guitars.

From 1961 onwards, Hoffmeister built on his pre-war experience with Surrealism and the reminiscences of childhood dreams that the collaged novels of Max Ernst had provided for him. In this vein, he composes collages from clippings of old xylographic reproductions, but he composes dreamlike plots and fantastic stories with an ironic distance, rather parodying and downplaying the classical methods of surrealism. Thematically, these collages are very varied – from dreamlike adventures against the backdrop of the depths of space (The Misfortune of Little Sophie, 1965) and poetic visions (In the Constellation of Fishes, 1963), through parodies of literary genres and sarcastic commentaries on life events (The Prospects of Marriage, 1964) to absurd puzzles with erotic or ironic overtones (New Anatomy, 1965). The surrealist legacy is echoed in his frottages, collaged with bizarre creatures assembled from clippings of anatomical atlases (New Anatomical Atlas, 1966).

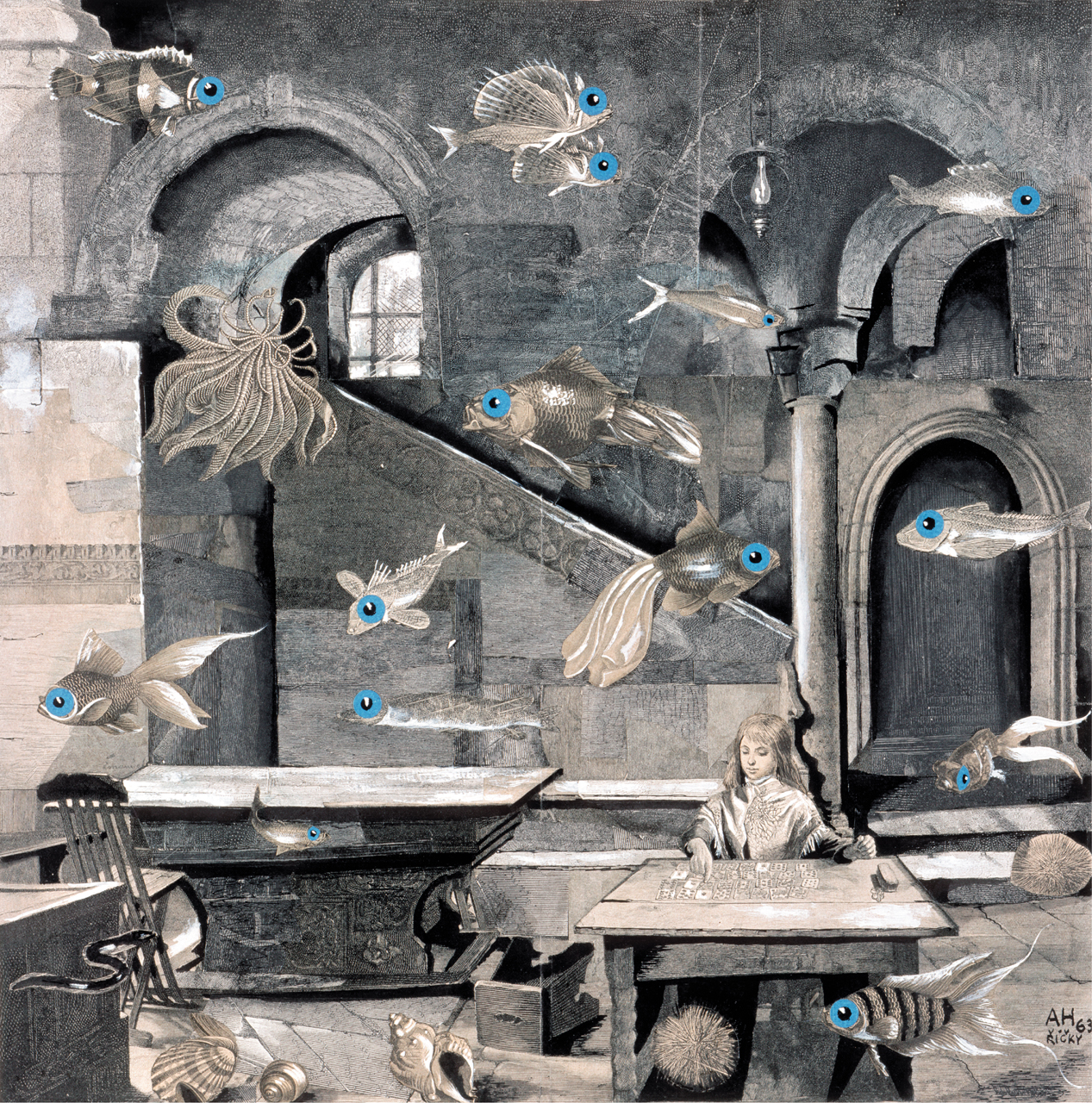
Adolf Hoffmeister, In the constellation of fish, 1963

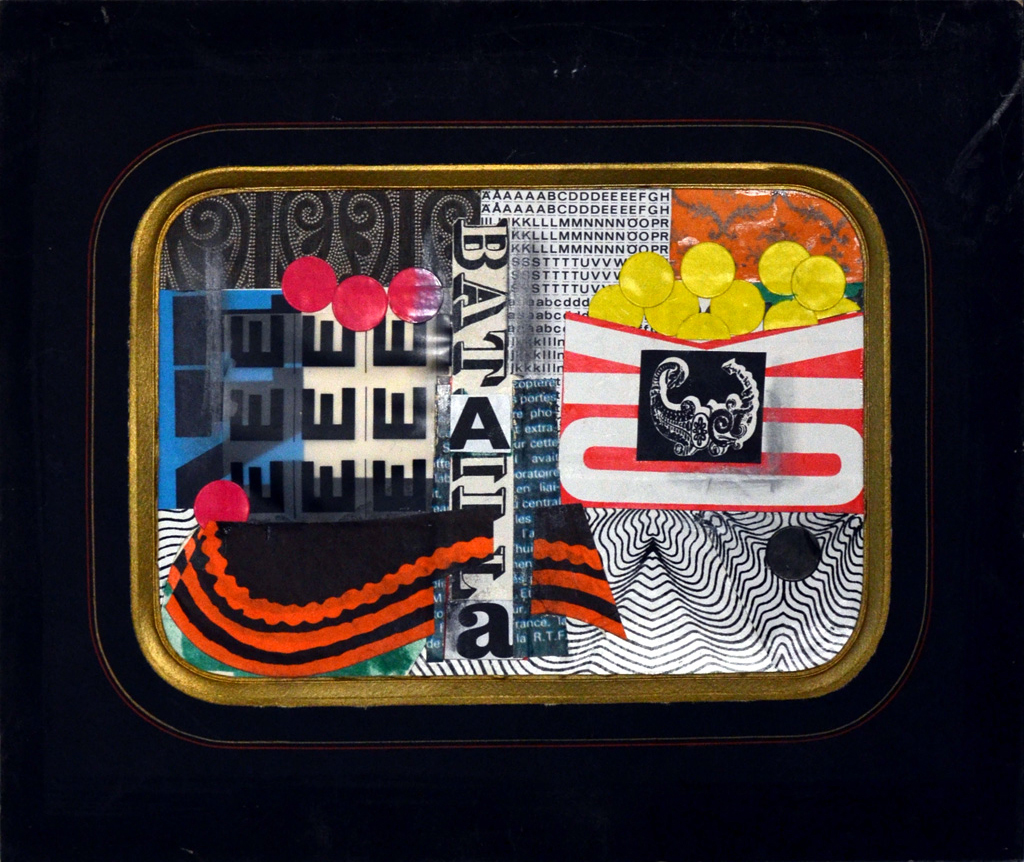
Adolf Hoffmeister, Typographic Still life, 1964

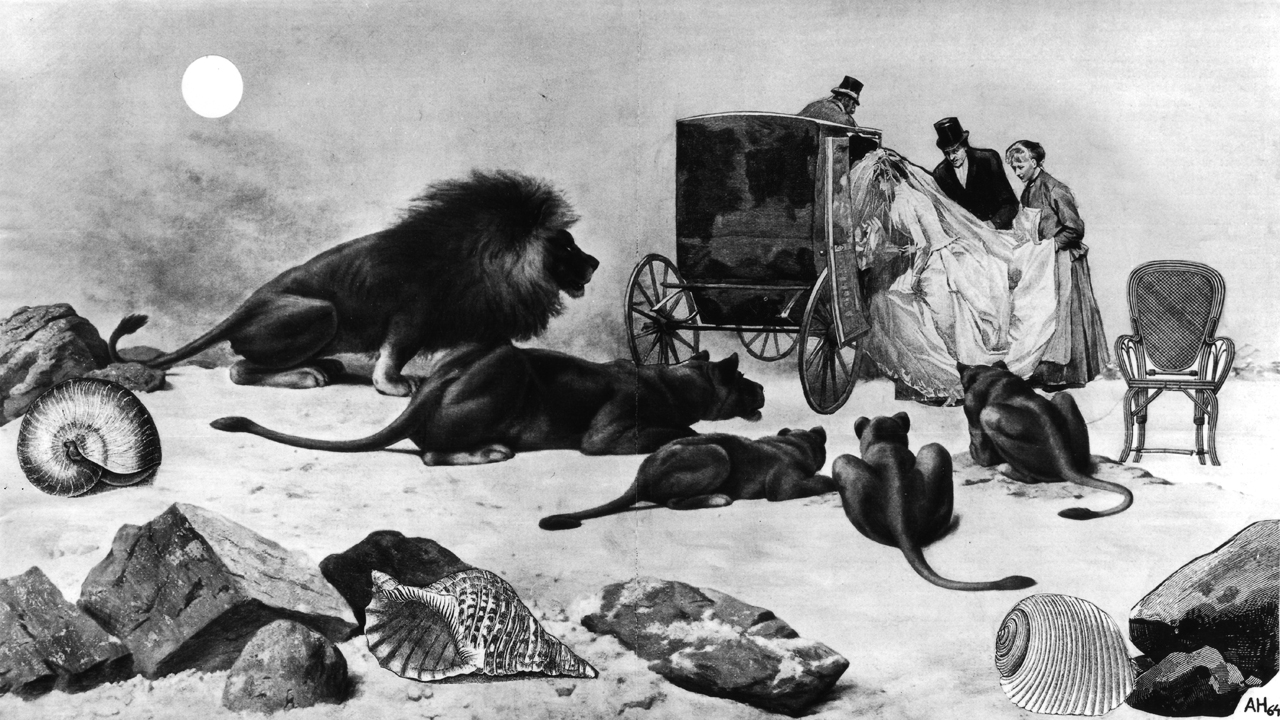
Adolf Hoffmeister, Prospects of Marriage, 1964

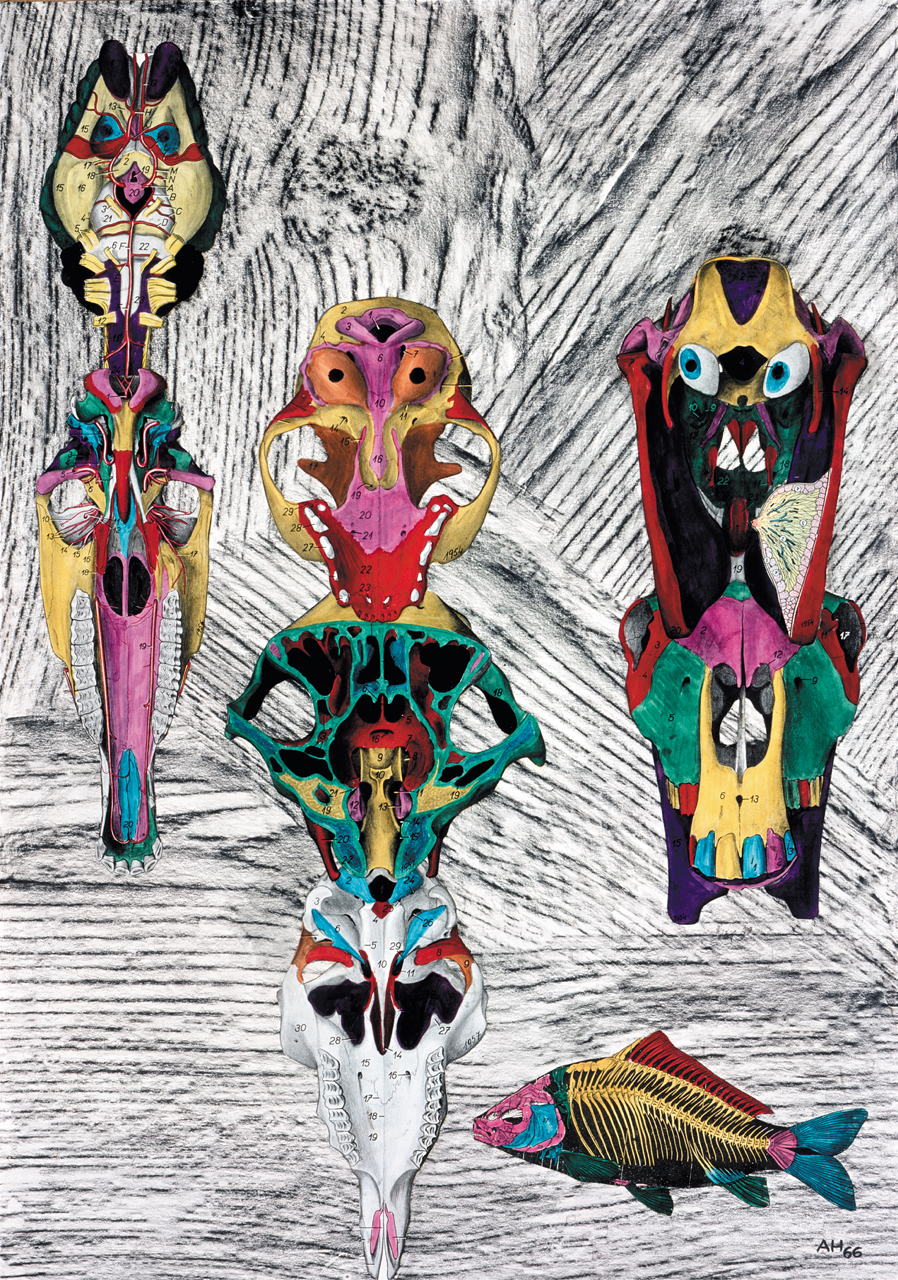
Adolf Hoffmeister, New Anatomical Atlas II, 1966

Hoffmeister also introduced a new collage technique based on perspective or parallel doubling of the image, which he called stereovision. In the series History Repeats Itself (1964–1965), the primary concern is not the creation of a spatial illusion, but a semantic appreciation of the principle of duplicity. Hoffmeister also illustrates various existential themes (Where Are We Going ?, 1967) by multiplying the same figure.

Since 1963, the focus of his work has been on combinations of black and white or coloured collages with colour drawings, which, among other things, reflect the reality of the contemporary over-technicalised world (Nervousness and Erotic Tension between human-machines, 1967). Hoffmeister found a connection with the early impulses that gave rise to Union of Modern Culture Devětsil in the antiestheticism of pop art and its artistic appreciation of banality. He thus created his own variations of pop art collages, in which he surrounded collaged drawings of heroes from old detective stories and romance novels with clippings of original covers and illustrations or juxtaposed them with female and male nudes from erotic magazines (Buffalo Bill, 1963, Nick Carter's Left Hand, 1964). The collages are also partly related to a visit to Prague by Robert Rauschenberg (1964). However, Hoffmeister was determined by his romantic generational background and, in contrast to the disinterested and utilitarian relationship of American pop art to reality, his work, using colour reproductions of contemporary printed matter, is more in the nature of ironic or critical commentary. He glosses, for example, the sexual revolution of the 1960s (Landscape of Photographers, 1966, Landscape of Lovers, 1967). The collage The Internal Political Struggle of Irons Against Cocks has the character of a light gloss on the political events of 1968.

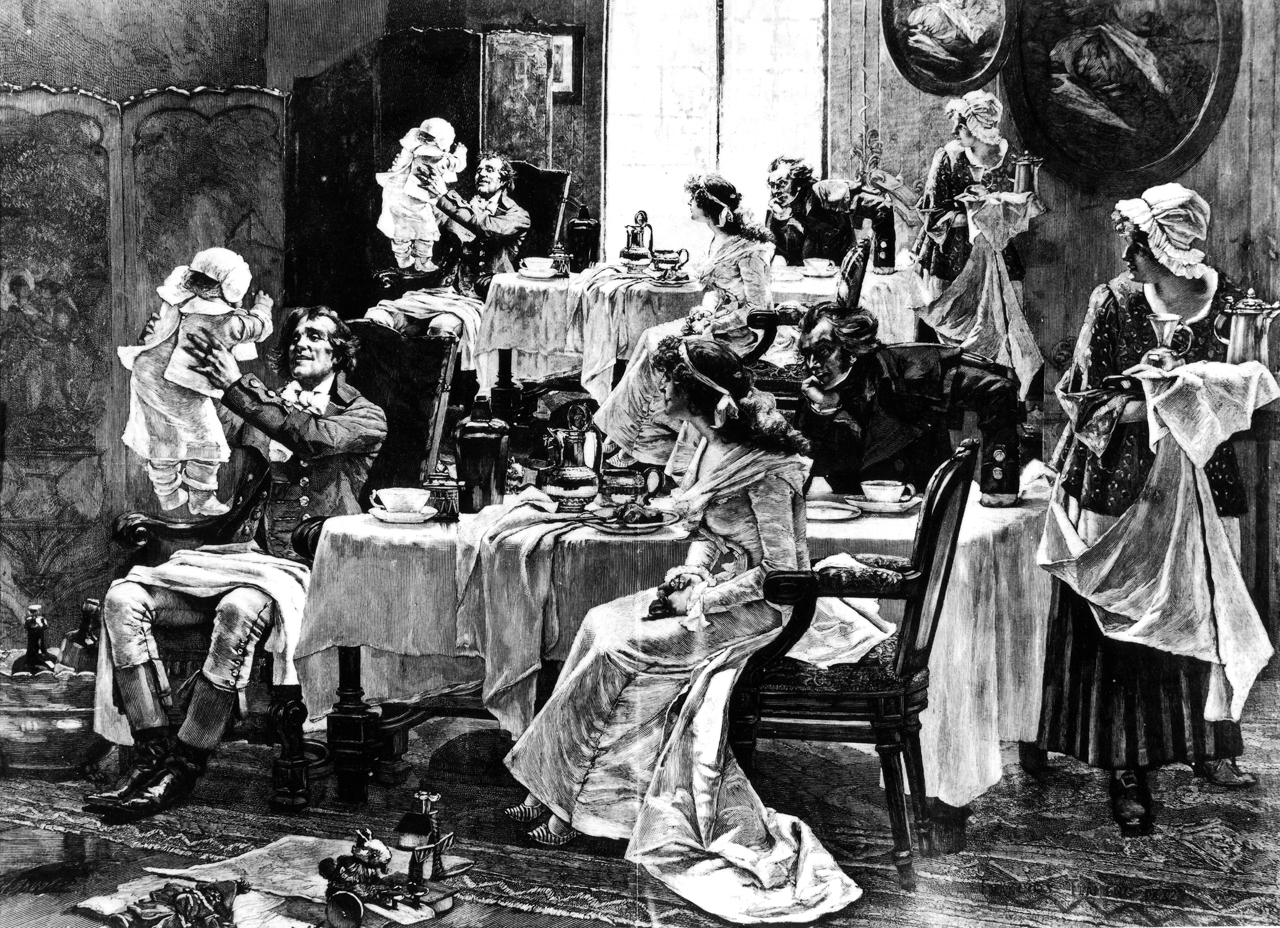
Adolf Hoffmeister, The Last Family Lunch of Camille Desmoulins (From the cycle History Repeats Itself), 1965

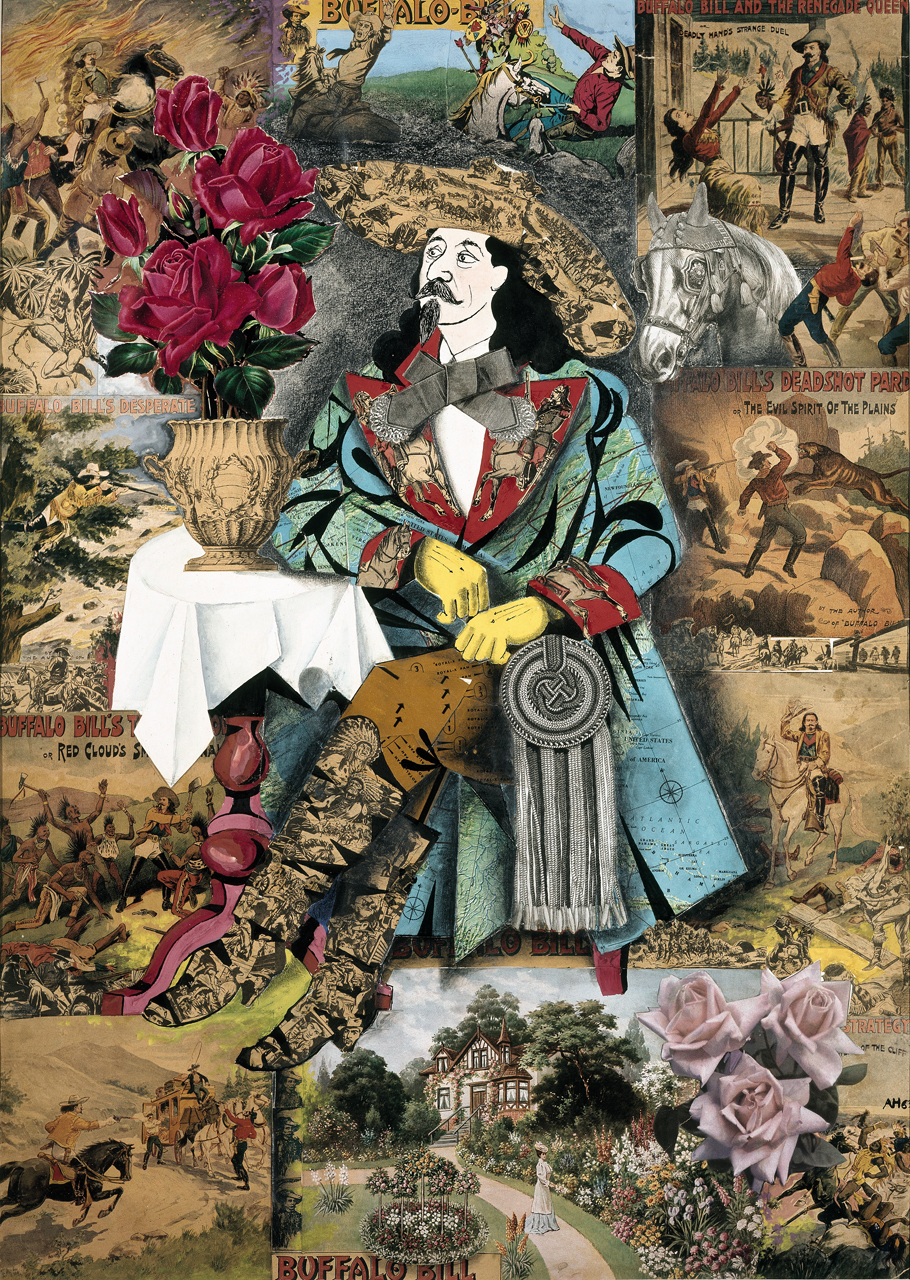
Adolf Hoffmeister, Buffalo Bill, 1963

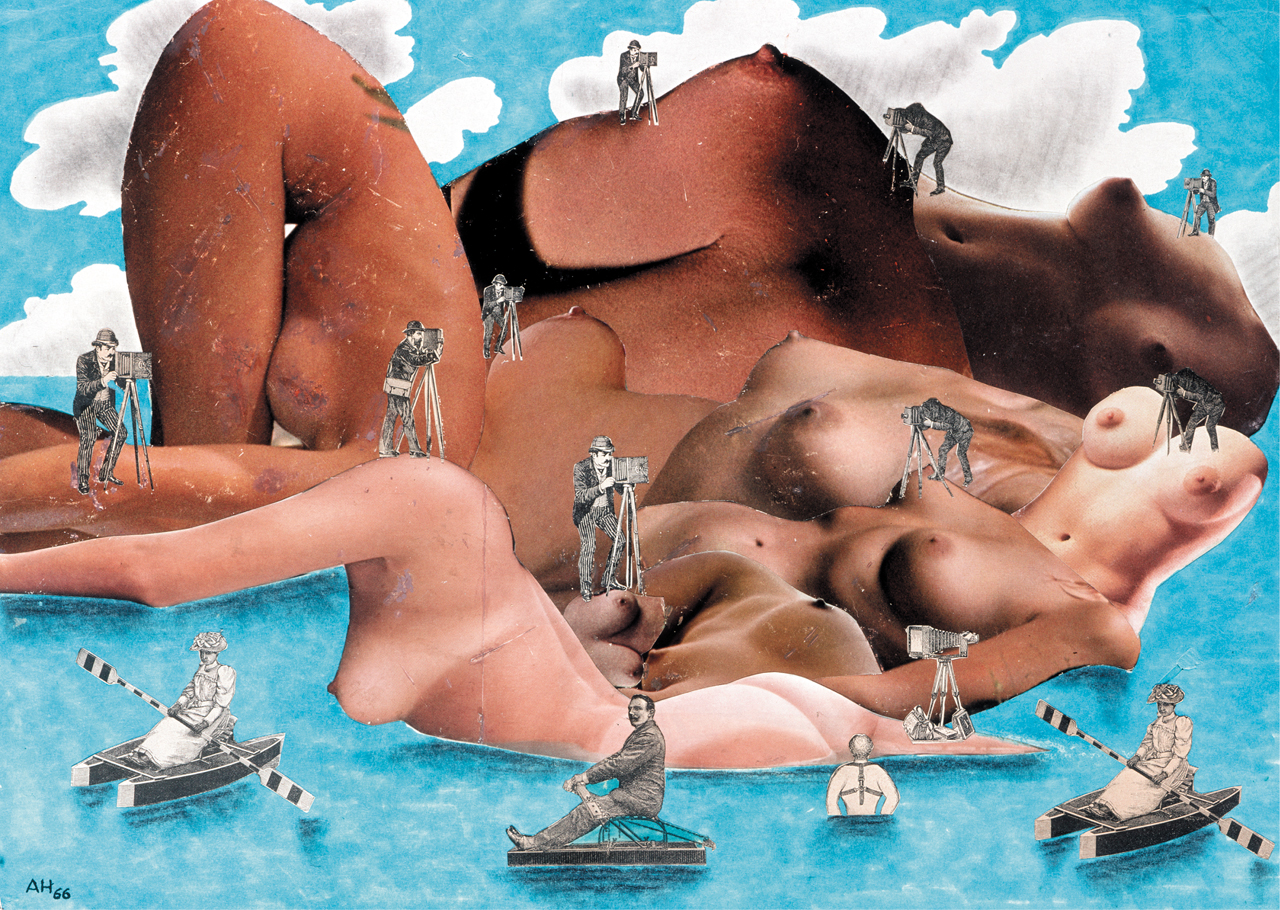
Adolf Hoffmeister, Landscape of Photographers, 1966

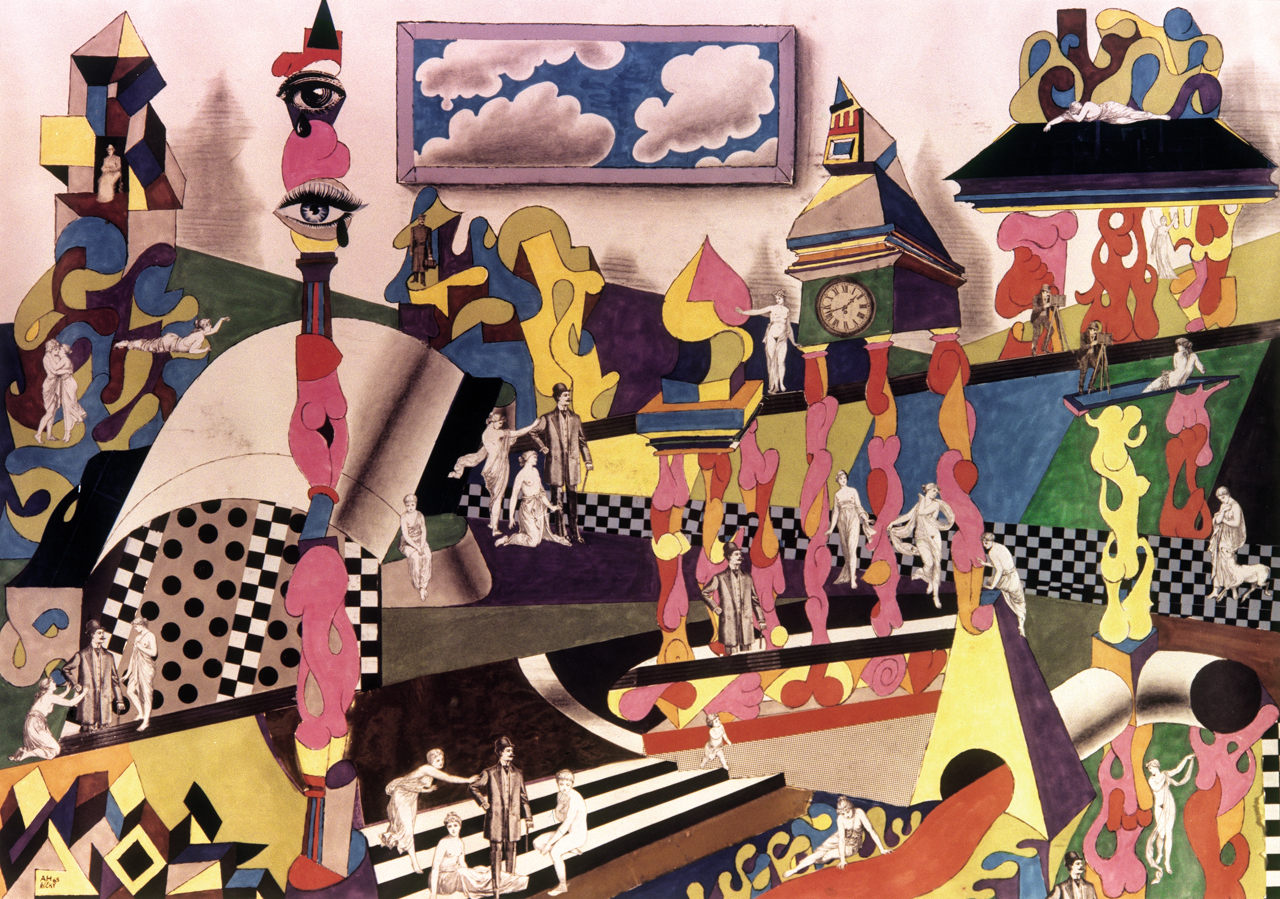
Adolf Hoffmeister, Death Gate with Totems, 1965

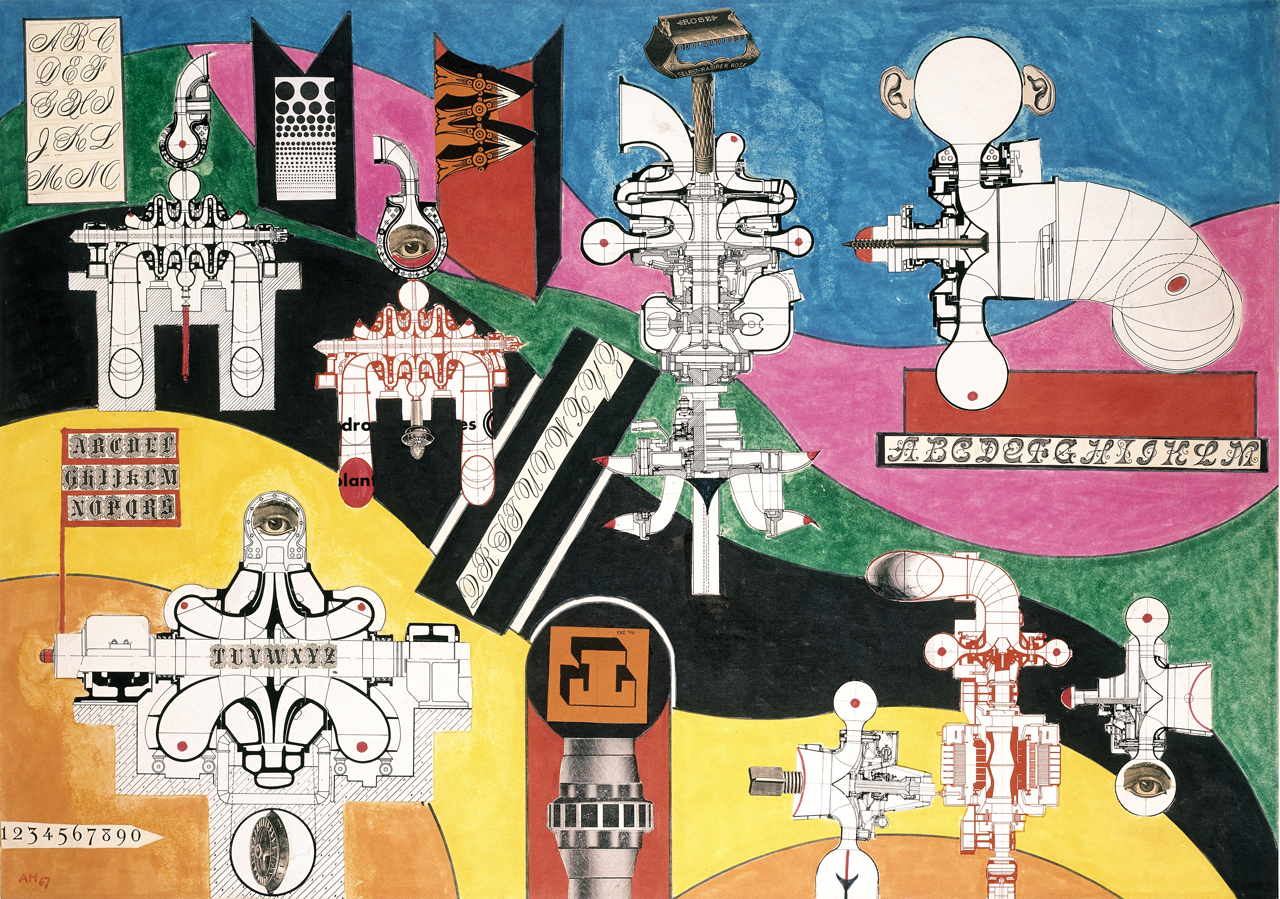
Adolf Hoffmeister, Nervousness and erotic tension between hydraulic human-machines, 1967

Since the second half of the 1960s, Hoffmeister's work has been increasingly marked by undertones of anxiety and reminders of the finality of human existence (Death's Customs House, 1965). After his forced retirement in 1970, Hoffmeister retreated to an involuntary confinement in the countryside and devoted himself intensively to artistic creation. The theme of death recurs in his work in various permutations in the 1970s (Death Lurks Everywhere for Children (Memento Mori), 1970, Murder, 1972) up to his last collage Life and Death II (1973). In his mind, this theme is mixed with a gloomy vision of the crisis of civilization and with concern about the state of the planet (There are white places left on Earth after humans, 1973). After suffering a heart attack and a long rehabilitation, he created more than 70 large-scale colour collages by June 1973, which he then privately exhibited for his friends. The series Hangovers from the Time of Men is a world without people after a catastrophe, populated with fantastic creatures and remnants of human activity or evoking the environment of the distant future. Many of the free collages are dedicated to contemporaries (Homage to the Beatles, 1973, Homage to Antonioni, 1973), but often the subjects are very private (The Fate of David, 1973, Broken Life, 1973).

=== Literary work ===
Hoffmeister wrote poems, plays (for the Osvobozené divadlo, and D 34 theatre of E. F. Burian), wrote and drew for periodicals (Tribuna, Rozpravy Aventina, Pestrý týden, Lidové noviny and others). He is co-author of the Czech translation of the excerpt Anna Livia Plurabella from the novel Finnegans Wake by James Joyce, whom he knew personally.

==== Poetry, prose, essays ====
- 1918 / 1921 – Prefaces and Prose (forthcoming first edition, not published due to the bankruptcy of the publisher Borový)
- 1922 – Underwater Stars, poetry, published by Borové. Chin, Prague
- 1926 – Alphabet of Love, poetry, publishing house Bořov, Prague. F. Svoboda
- 1926 – Cambridge – Prague, feuilletons, published by the Svoboda publishing house. A. Srdce
- 1926 – The Capricorn Turner, novel, publisher. Aventinum, O. Štorch-Marien
- 1927 – Hors d'oeuvre: Feuilletons, cartoons, epigrams, Aventinum
- 1927 – Looking for a man who has enough time, publisher. A. Srdce
- 1929 / 1930 – The Globe
- 1930 – Calendar, Aventinum
- 1930 / 1960 – Poetry and cartoons
- 1930 – Write as you hear, Rozpravy Aventinum, summary in book form, Družstevní práce, Prague 1931
- 1931 – Surface of the Five-Year Plan, reports from the USSR, publisher. Sfinx
- 1931 – Světobol, a collection of travel notes, publisher. Prokop Toman
- 1937 – František Xaver Šalda
- 1937 – American Swings, bound by L. Sutnar, published by the European Literary Club, 1937
- 1938 – Brundibár (libretto for an opera by Hans Krása, premiered in 1943 in Terezín)
- 1939 – The Tramp or King Hunger
- 1939 / 1940 – Prison
- 1941 – The Animals Are In Cages/Unwilling Tourist
- 1951 – Three Months in New York
- 1954 / 1956 – Postcards from China
- 1954 – Guo-hua: A Travel Report on Chinese Painting, German Artia 1957 (Guo-hua, Die Chineschische Malerei)
- 1954 – How I Knew V. H. Brunner
- 1955 – One Hundred Years of Czech Cartoons
- 1955 – Karel Václav Klíč: About a Forgotten Artist Who Became an Inventor
- 1956 – The Telescope or Who Doesn't Believe, Let Him Go There (travel book for children), 2nd edition 1959, 3rd edition with new illustrations 1966
- 1957 – A View from the Pyramids: A travelogue about the new youth of the world's oldest culture
- 1958 – Report on the Congress for Disarmament and Cooperation of Nations in Stockholm, 16–22 July 1958
- 1958 – Made In Japan: travel report on the country where the first atomic bomb exploded
- 1958 – The Three-Way – a selection from the works of Adolf Hoffmeister (1st of six volumes, includes The Surface of the Five-Year Plan, American Swings, A Tourist Against His Will), published by the University of California Press. Čs spisovatel Praha
- 1958 – Kavárna Union (editor of a collection of memoirs of witnesses), Publishing House of Czechoslovak Fine Artists
- 1959 – Contemporary Chinese Painting (A. Hoffmeister, L. Hájek, E. Rychterová), Czechoslovak Fine Arts Publishing House
- 1959 – Flights against the Sun (2nd volume of the committee of works, includes Postcards from China, View from the Pyramids, Made in Japan), publisher. Čs spisovatel Praha
- 1961 – Poetry and Caricature (a committee of Hoffmeister's reflections on caricature from 1929 to 1960)
- 1961 – Greeting to Picasso (I. Erenburg, A. Hoffmeister), SNKLU, Prague
- 1961 – On Nezval, Czechoslovak Writer, Prague
- 1962 – Prefaces – 4th volume of a committee of works with a preface about Devětsil, 297 p., illustrations by Zdenek Seydl, Adolf Hoffmeister, Czechoslovak Writer, Prague
- 1964 – Skyscrapers in the Forest, 232 p., Czechoslovak Writer Prague
- 1965 – Time Does Not Return!, Czechoslovak Writer Prague
- 1966 – Idu po zemle, illustrated selection of all Hoffmeister's books, publisher. Progres, Moscow
- 1967 – Paris & Surroundings, 220 p., Czechoslovak Writer, Prague
- 1968 – History of the Uprising of One Against Another, short story, first published 1930 in the anthology Víno
- 1988 – Podoby & předobrazy, illustrated selection of feuilletons and essays, Czechoslovak Writer, Prague

==== Drama ====
- 1921 Untitled one-act play, performed in Piešt'any
- 1922 one-act play Dead on the Street (printed in Divadlo II, No. 20)
- 1927 The Bride (a merry play), Passepartout, Park, The Convict (short ballets), published by the publisher. Odeon by J. Fromek
- 1932 Singing Venice ( Melantrich, 1946)
- 1933 The World Behind Bars, Osvobozené divadlo (author's contribution to the libretto and set design)
- 1933 Peace (based on Aristophanes), anti-war comedy, banned by the censors, not performed until 1964, published in book form 1963
- 1935 Youth in a Play, text published in the programme of the D 35 theatre
- 1942 The Blind Man's Whistle or Lidice
- 1949 Singing Venice, a comedy in three acts, based on Goldoni's Café, Melantrich
- 1963 Plays and counterplays (Singing Venice; The Tramp or King Famine; Brundibár; The Blind Man's Whistle or Lidice) Orbis, Prague 1963.
- 1963 Plays from the avant-garde (The Bride; Park; Passepartout; The Convict; Youth in Play; Liberated Theatre) Peace, Orbis, Prague 1963
- 1970 Greek Tragedy
- 1971 Execution, 1973 Pissoir, published as a joint publication by Dilia, 1990
- 1993, 1998 Brundibár, children's opera (first performed in 1943 in Terezín, not in print until after 1989, as a comic 2003)

==== Selections of drawings published in print ====
- Podoby (Visages), SVU Mánes Prague, 1934
- Šarži (Podoby), published by the publisher. Krokodil, Moscow 1935
- Jesters in Earnest, John Murray, London 1944
- Drawing by Adolf Hoffmeister (introduction by Voskovec and Werich, texts by Vailland, Soupault, etc., graphic design by Zdeněk Sklenář), published by SVU Mánes and Melantrich, Prague 1948
- Podoby, Výbor z díla Adolf Hoffmeister; vol. 3, 395 p., Československý spisovatel Praha 1961
- Visages écrits et dessinés (with an introduction by Jean Effel), Paris 1964
- The Art of Adolf Hoffmeister (introduction by Miroslav Lamač), 204 p., Publishing House of Czechoslovak Artists, Prague 1966
- Adolf Hoffmeister: Visages & collages. Œuvres des annés 1926–1973, Galerie le Minotaure, Paris 2006

==== Illustrations (selection) ====
- The Anarchist Thursday (G.K. Chesterton; translated by Jiří Foustka), Ladislav Kuncíř, Prague 1928
- The Club of Strange Trades (G.K. Chesterton, translated by Jiří Foustka), Ladislav Kuncíř, Prague 1928
- 10 HP (Ilja Erenburg, translated by V. Koenig), Ot. Štorch-Marien, Prague 1930
- The Wonderful Magician (Vítězslav Nezval, introductory essay written, volume arranged and biographical and bibliographical data provided by Milan Kundera), Czechoslovak Writer, Prague 1963
- The First People on the Moon (Herbert George Wells, translated by Dagmar Knittlová), SNKLU, Prague 1964
- Gold (Blais Cendrars), SNKL Prague 1964
- Giraffe or Tulip? (Miloš Macourek), Mladá fronta, Prague 1964
- Philatelic Tales (František Langer), Čs. spisovatel, Prague 1964
- Jiří Wolker's Fairy Tales, SNDK Prague 1964
- Generations, texts of interviews by A.J. Liehm, illustrations by Adolf Hoffmeister, 466 p., originally for the publisher. Čs spisovatel 1969, published by Index, Cologne 1988, Czechoslovak Writer, Prague 1990

==== Filmography ====
- 1957 Creation of the World (lyrics)
- 1966 Pipe (literary collaboration on the short story "Lord's Pipe")
- 1969 The Bride (Slovak TV film, author of the theme)
- 1970 The Fate of a Little Sailor (author of the theme and screenplay, designer)
- 1970 Růženka, do you sleep alone? (Author of the theme of the TV production based on the play The Bride)

== Sources ==
- Devětsil 1920–1931, exhibition catalogue, Prague City Gallery, 2019, ISBN 9788070101605
- Alena Binarová, Svaz výtvarných umělců v českých zemích v letech 1956–1972 / The Union of Visual Artists in the Czech Lands 1956–1972, Palacký University Olomouc 2017, ISBN 978-80-87895-84-9
- František Šmejkal, Hoffmeisterova kronika doby / Hoffmeister's chronicle of the time, 270 p., North Bohemian Gallery of Visual Arts in Litoměřice, Terezín Memorial 2016, ISBN 9788087784150
- Alena Binarová, Svaz výtvarných umělců v českých zemích v letech 1956–1972: oficiální výtvarná tvorba v proměnách komunistického režimu. Dissertation, FF UP v Olomouci 2016 on line
- Kateřina Boukalová, Dramatická tvorba Adolfa Hoffmeistera / Playwriting of Adolf Hoffmeister, diploma work, FF MUNI Brno 2007 on line
- Andrea Sloupová, Galerie umění a akviziční politika v době normalizace / Art Galleries and Acquisition Policy in the Normalization Era. Dissertation, FF a UDU UK Praha 2016
- Alena Pertlová, Adolf Hoffmeister: čtenář a tvůrce / Adolf Hoffmeister: the reader and the creator, diploma work, FF UK Praha, 2014
- Adolf Hoffmeister, Visages & collages. Œuvres des annés 1926–1973, Galerie le Minotaure, Paris 2006
- Karel Srp (ed.), Adolf Hoffmeister, 400 p., Gallery Praha 2004, ISBN 8086010864
- Vlasta Čiháková-Noshiro: Adolf Hoffmeister, in: A. Horová (ed.), Nová encyklopedie českého výtvarného umění / New Encyclopedia of Czech Visual Arts (A-M), pp. 272–273, Academia Praha 1995, ISBN 80-200-0521-8
- Jindřich Pecka, Vilém Prečan (eds.), Proměny Pražského jara 1968–1969: Sborník studií a dokumentů o nekapitulantských postojích v československé společnosti / The Transformations of the Prague Spring 1968–1969: A Collection of Studies and Documents on Non-Capitulating Attitudes in Czechoslovak Society, 446 p., Brno 1993
- Vladimír Forst et al, Lexikon české literatury : osobnosti, díla, instituce / Lexicon of Czech literature : personalities, works, institutions.. 2/I. H–J. Praha: Academia, 1993. 589 p. ISBN 80-200-0468-8.
- Marie Valtrová – Ota Ornest: Hraje váš tatínek ještě na housle? / Does your daddy still play the violin?, Primus, Praha, 1993, ISBN 8085625199, pp. 53, 66, 146–7, 287
- Jaromír Pelc, Osvobozené divadlo, 488 p., Mladá fronta, Praha, 1990, ISBN 8020401652
- Zdeněk Hedbávný: Divadlo Větrník, Panorama, Praha, 1988, pp. 45–6, 49
- Jaromír Pelc, Zpráva o Osvobozeném divadle / Report on the Liberated Theatre, 216 p., Práce, Praha, 1982
- Jaromír Pelc, Meziválečná avantgarda a Osvobozené divadlo / Interwar Avant-Garde and Liberated Theatre, 247 p., Ústav pro kulturně výchovnou činnost, Praha, 1981
- Miroslav Lamač, Výtvarné dílo Adolfa Hoffmeistera / The artwork of Adolf Hoffmeister, 204 p., NČVU Praha 1966
- Adolf Hoffmeister, Čas se nevrací / Time does not turn back, Praha 1965
- AH 17–63, Artwork by Adolf Hoffmeister, catalogue 20 p., Mánes Exhibition Hall, Prague, November 1963 (text by Miroslav Lamač)
- B. Šmeral (ed.) Anthologie protifašistických umělců / Anthology of Anti-Fascist Artists, Praha 1936, 565 numbered copies, signed illustrations by Toyen, Jindřich Štyrský, Adolf Hoffmeister, Antonín Pelc, František Bidlo
