= Czech speculative fiction =

Science fiction and fantasy of Czechia

Science fiction and fantasy in the Czech Republic has a long and varied history. From 1918, when Czechoslovakia became independent, until 1939, when Nazi Germany invaded it, Czech literature enjoyed one of its high points.

Czech writers developed their works as aesthetic pieces rather than as platforms demanding independence for the Czech people. The best-known and most important of SF writers was Karel Čapek, whose play R.U.R. (Rossum's Universal Robots) (printed 1920, premiered January 1921), introduced and made popular the frequently used international word robot.

Čapek is perhaps best known as a science fiction author, who wrote before science fiction became established as a separate genre. He can be considered one of the founders of classical, non-hardcore European science fiction, a type which focuses on possible future (or alternative) social and human evolution on Earth, rather than technically advanced stories of space travel. However, it is best to classify him with Aldous Huxley and George Orwell as a mainstream literary figure who used science-fiction motifs. Many of his works discuss ethical and other aspects of revolutionary inventions and processes that were already anticipated in the first half of 20th century. These include mass production, atomic weapons, and non-human intelligent beings such as robots, space-faring gypsies or intelligent salamanders (in his War with the Newts).

Josef Nesvadba, writing since the late 1950s, quickly became the best-known Czech SF author of the post-war generation, being translated into English and German, even though he moved from the SF proper after his first 3-story collections to the fringes of fantastic genre and mainstream.

== Notable Czech SF writers ==
- Karel Čapek
- Josef Nesvadba
- Ludvík Souček
- Ondřej Neff
- Jiří Kulhánek
- Miroslav Žamboch
- Jaroslav Velinský
- Lucie Lukačovičová
- Petra Neomillnerová

== Film ==
- Skeleton on Horseback (Bílá nemoc) (1937)
- Krakatit (1948)
- Journey to the Beginning of Time (1955)
- The Fabulous World of Jules Verne (1958)
- Man in Outer Space (1961)
- The Cybernetic Grandma (1962)
- Voyage to the End of the Universe (Ikarie XB-1, 1963)
- Who Wants to Kill Jessie? (1966)
- Late August at the Hotel Ozone (1967)
- I Killed Einstein, Gentlemen (1969)
- On the Comet (1970)
- You Are a Widow, Sir (1971)
- Což takhle dát si špenát (1977)
- Tomorrow I'll Wake Up and Scald Myself with Tea (1977)
- Talíře nad Velkým Malíkovem (1977)
- Visitors from the Galaxy (1981)
- The Mysterious Castle in the Carpathians (1981)
- Srdečný pozdrav ze zeměkoule (1983)
- Wolf's Hole (1987)
- The Witches Cave (1989)
- A Sound of Thunder (2005)
- Snowpiercer (2013)
- Lajka (2017)
- Restore Point (2023)

== See also ==
- XB-1, Czech literary monthly magazine dedicated to science fiction , fantasy , and horror
