= 1931 Čapek =

Main-belt asteroid

Discovery
- Discovered by: L. Kohoutek
- Discovery site: Bergedorf Obs.
- Discovery date: 22 August 1969

Designations
- Named after: Karel Čapek (Czech writer)
- Alternative designations: 1969 QB · 1957 TK; 1969 PB
- Minor planet category: main-belt · (middle)

Orbital characteristics
- Epoch 4 September 2017 (JD 2458000.5)
- Uncertainty parameter 0
- Observation arc: 59.76 yr (21,826 days)
- Aphelion: 3.2311 AU
- Perihelion: 1.8513 AU
- Semi-major axis: 2.5412 AU
- Eccentricity: 0.2715
- Orbital period (sidereal): 4.05 yr (1,480 days)
- Mean anomaly: 297.94°
- Mean motion: 0° 14^{m} 35.88^{s} / day
- Inclination: 8.2623°
- Longitude of ascending node: 182.43°
- Argument of perihelion: 164.55°

Physical characteristics
- Dimensions: 6.628±0.214 km
- Geometric albedo: 0.254±0.035
- Spectral type: Tholen = C
- Absolute magnitude (H): 13.0

1931 Čapek, provisional designation 1969 QB, is a background asteroid from the central regions of the asteroid belt, approximately 7 kilometers in diameter. It was discovered on 22 August 1969, by Czech astronomer Luboš Kohoutek at the Bergedorf Observatory in Hamburg, Germany. The asteroid was named in memory of Czech writer Karel Čapek.

== Orbit and classification ==
Čapek is a background asteroid, not associated to any known asteroid family. It orbits the Sun in the inner part of the central main-belt near the 3:1 resonance with Jupiter at a distance of 1.9–3.2 AU once every 4 years and 1 month (1,480 days). Its orbit has an eccentricity of 0.27 and an inclination of 8° with respect to the ecliptic.

The asteroid was first identified as 1957 TK at Goethe Link Observatory in October 1957. The body's observation arc begins at Crimea–Nauchnij, eleven days prior to its official discovery observation at Bergedorf.

== Physical characteristics ==
=== Spectral type ===
In the Tholen classification, Čapek is a common carbonaceous C-type asteroid. This strongly disagrees with the albedo obtained by the Wide-field Infrared Survey Explorer (WISE), which indicates that Čapek is a stony S-type asteroid rather than a carbonaceous one.

=== Rotation period ===
As of 2017, no rotational lightcurve of Čapek has been obtained from photometric observations. The asteroid's rotation period, shape and poles remain unknown.

=== Diameter and albedo ===
According to the survey carried out by the NEOWISE mission of NASA's Wide-field Infrared Survey Explorer, Čapek measures 6.628 kilometers in diameter and its surface has an albedo of 0.254.

== Naming ==
This minor planet was named in memory of Karel Čapek (1890–1938), Czech dramatist and novelist, best known for his allegorical plays R.U.R. and Krakatit, in which he anticipated both the destructive potential of nuclear physics and its moral implications. The official naming citation was published by the Minor Planet Center on 27 June 1991 (M.P.C. 18447).
