= Philosophy and Science Fiction =

Book published in 1984

Philosophy and Science Fiction is an anthology published in 1984.

== Plot summary ==
Philosophy and Science Fiction contains 14 stories, the play R.U.R., two extracts, roughly 30 pages of introduction to philosophy, and a series of Study Questions.

== Reception ==
Dave Langford reviewed Philosophy and Science Fiction for White Dwarf #65, and stated that "Too expensive for most; interesting if you contemplate a philosophy course. Can editor and self-confessed philosopher Michael Philips really not spell hermeneutics? He gets it wrong ten times in two pages."

== Reviews ==
- Review by Michael R. Collings (1984) in Fantasy Review, November 1984
- Review by Don D'Ammassa (1985) in Science Fiction Chronicle, #64 January 1985
