= František Kubka =

Czech author and diplomat

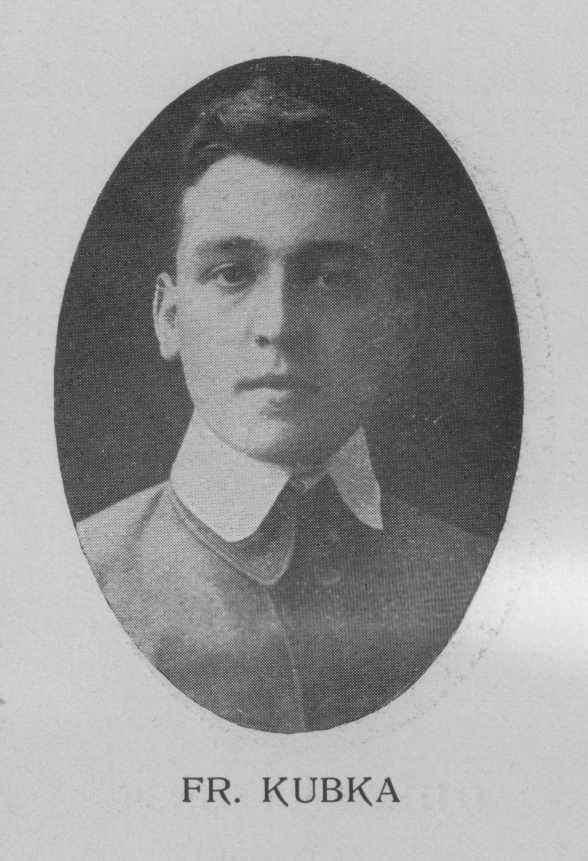

Personal details
- Born: 4 March 1894 Prague, Austria-Hungary
- Died: 7 January 1969 (aged 74)

František Kubka (4 March 1894 – 7 January 1969) was a Czech writer, journalist and diplomat. He was a regular at the "Friday Men" meetings at Karel Čapek's house from 1921 to 1938. His folk tale of the romance of Peter Vok with a miller's daughter became the basis of the most popular post-war Czech opera, Zuzana Vojířová. He was appointed ambassador to Bulgaria (1946–1949).
