= Kodíček =

Kodíček (feminine: Kodíčková) is a Czech surname derived from the pet name of the names Nikodým/Nikodém (Czech variants of the given name Nicodemus). Notable people with the surname include:

- Josef Kodíček (1892–1954), Czech journalist and theatre critic
- Susan Kodicek, anglicised name of Zuzana Kodíčková (1947–2011), Czech actress
