= Jan Bor =

Czech theatre director and publicist

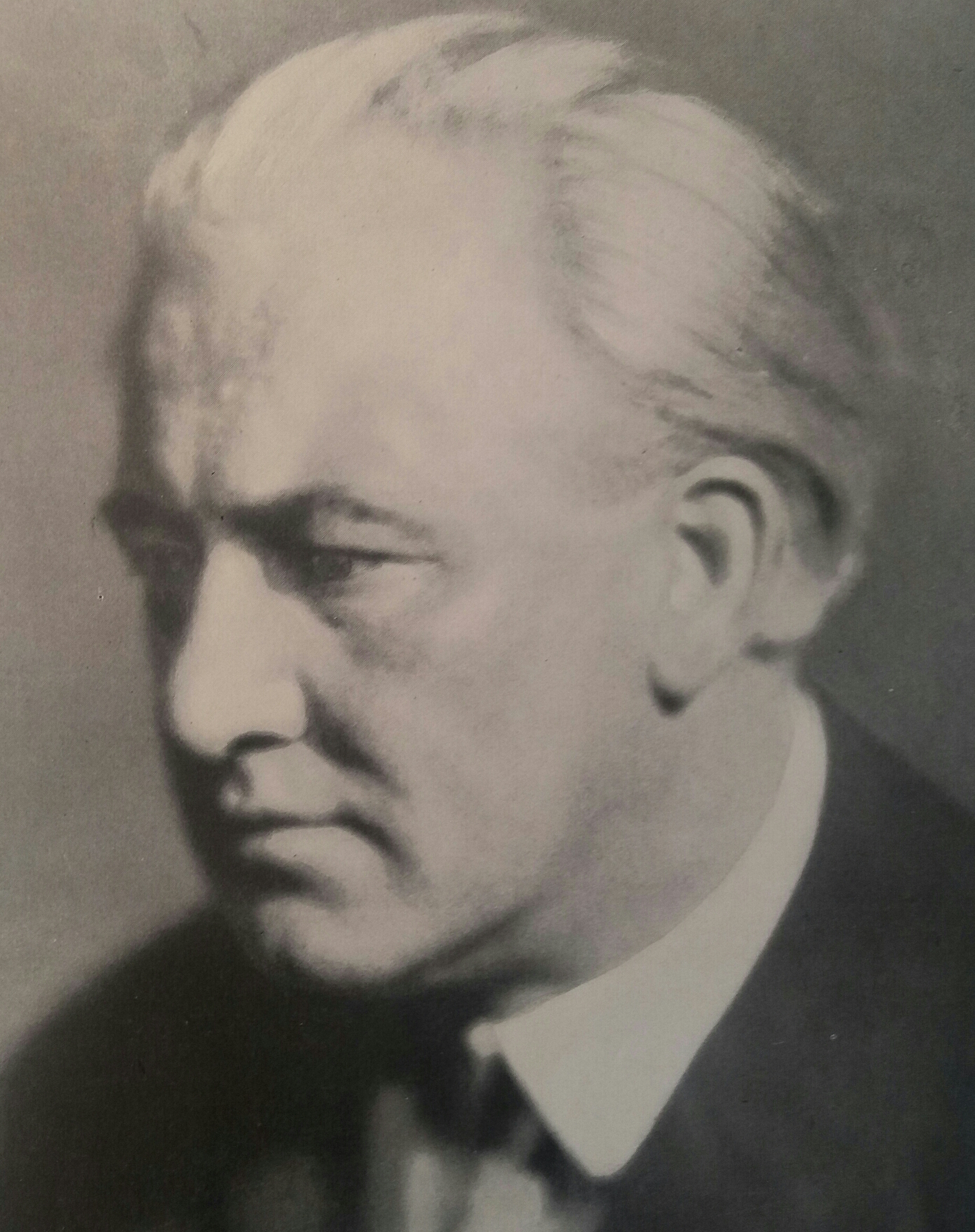
Jan Bor in c. 1930

Jan Bor (born Jan Křtitel Matěj Strejček; 16 February 1886 – 25 March 1943) was a Czech theatre director and playwright. His drama became the basis of Jiří Pauer's libretto for the opera Zuzana Vojířová (1958).

== Life and career ==
Bor was born Jan Křtitel Matěj Strejček on 16 February 1886 in Prague. He was a pupil of Max Reinhardt, when he studied in Berlin from 1912 to 1914. He worked in various Prague theatres. He was employed for the longest time in the Vinohrady Theatre (1924–1938), where he worked as chief director and then as artistic director. From 1939 to 1943, he was artistic director in National Theatre. He died of angina on 25 March 1943 in Hluboká nad Vltavou and is buried there.
