= Zbyněk Vostřák =

Czech composer (1920–1985)

Zbyněk Vostřák (10 June 1920 – 4 August 1985) was a prominent Czech composer of New Music.

== Life ==
He studied composition privately with Rudolf Karel and was a conducting student of Pavel Dědeček in Prague. From 1939 to 1943 he was a member of the Prague Radio Orchestra. Vostřák held many jobs, including pedagogical jobs and conducting jobs for Czech radio and the National Theatre. He nonetheless spent the majority of his time on his compositions

== Style ==
Vostřák initiated his work in the generic Romantic style. Beginning with his cycle of songs entitled While Falling Asleep, he turned to dodecaphony and techniques proceeding from this particular principle. In the following years Vostřák employed the style known by the general title of New Music. During the late 1960s and early 1970s he was widely engaged in composing electronic music which he sometimes combined with live performers. During the first stage of his career Vostřák wrote several successful operas and ballets. The following phase featured almost exclusively concert compositions with a predominance of instrumental music. Many of Vostřák's works are regarded as pioneering achievements in this field. As a result of Czechoslovakia's official cultural policy in the 1970s and 1980s, particularly in relation to the kind of music composed by Vostřák at that time, the composer had steadily decreasing possibilities for introducing his compositions at home, even though he had succumbed to national pressure by resorting to the use of phony titles for some of his works.

== Selected works ==
Operas

- Rohovín čtvernohý (Four-Cornered Hat), Comic Opera in 1 act, op.12 (1948); libretto by Josef Bachtik based on the play by Václav Kliment Klicpera
- The Miners of Kutná Hora (The King's Master of the Mint), Opera in 4 acts; libretto by Josef Bachtik based on the play by Josef Kajetán Tyl
- Prague Nocturne, Opera in 6 scenes, op.23 (1957); libretto by Jan Wenig based on the short story by František Kubka
- Rozbitý džbán (The Broken Jug), Comic Opera, op.25 (1960); libretto by Karel Jernek based on the comedy by Heinrich von Kleist

Ballets

- Primroses, Grand Ballet in 2 acts, op.10 (1944); libretto by Gabriela Najmanová based on a story by Svatopluk Čech
- Philosophers History, Ballad in 3 scenes, op.13; libretto by Jan Rey based on the Alois Jirasek novella
- Viktorka (Victoria), Dance Ballad in 4 scenes, op.15 (1950); libretto by Jan Rey according to a theme by Božena Němcová
- Sněhurka (Snow White), Ballet in 7 scenes, op.20 (1955); libretto by Jan Rey
- Merry Water Sprites, Ballet in 3 acts (1979); libretto by Jan Rey

Orchestral compositions

- Serenade for orchestra in G, op.5 (1940)
- Pražská ouvertura (Prague Overture) for large orchestra, op.6 (1941)
- Primroses, Suite from the ballet, op.10 (1946)
- Rohovín čtvernohý (Four-Cornered Hat), Overture to the opera, op.12 (1948)
- Philosophers History, Suite from the ballet, op.14
- Viktorka (Victoria), Suite from the dance ballad, op.16 (1950, re-written 1958)
- Polka Suite for Orchestra, op.19 (1954)
- Sněhurka (Snow White), Suite from the ballet, op.22a (1956)
- Sněhurka (Snow White), Dance Suite from the ballet, op.22b (1957)
- Prague Nocturne, Music from the opera, op.24 (1950)
- Zrození měsíce (The Birth of the Moon) for chamber orchestra, op.39 (1966)
- Metahudba (Metamusic) for Large Orchestra, op.43 (1968)
- Tajemství elipsy (The Mystery of the Ellipse) for large orchestra, op.44 (1970)
- Mosaic for 3 orchestral groups, op.45 (1970)
- Secret Fishing for four groups of instruments whose composition will be determined by the condudor, op.49 (1973)
- Trias for orchestra, op.51 (1974)
- The Pyramids Looking into Eternity for orchestra, op.53 (1975)
- Parabola (Parable) for large orchestra and tape, op.55 (1977)
- Cathedral (a.k.a. Variations) for large orchestra, op.61 (1979)

Concertante

- The Pendulum of Time, Composition for violoncello, four groups of instruments and electronic organ, op.40 (1966–1967)
- Kapesní vesmír (Pocket Space), for flute, cimbalom and strings, op.62 (1980) or flute, cimbalom, horn, strings and percussion (1984)
- Krystaly (Crystals), for English horn, strings and percussion, op.65 (1983)
- Vítězná perla (The Victorious Pearl), Concerto for piano and orchestra, op.66 (1984)
- Tajemství růže (The Secret of the Rose), Concerto for organ, brass quintet and percussion, op.67 (1984–1985)

Chamber music

- Burlesque for clarinet and piano, op.11 (1945)
- Contrasts for string quartet, op.27 (1961)
- Rekolekce (Recollection – The Cloud of Ignorance) for solo violin, op.30 (1962)
- Tři eseje (Three Essays) for Piano, op.31 (1962)
- Affetti (Affects), Improvization for 7 instruments (flute, clarinet, bassoon, violin, viola, cello, piano), op.32
- Elementy (Elements) for string quartet, op.35 (1964)
- Trigonum for violin, oboe and piano, op.36 (1965)
- Synchronia for clarinet, bassoon, violin, cello, piano and harp, op.37 (1965)
- Cosmogonia for string quartet, op.38 (1965)
- Tao, Twelve Leaves for 9 players (flute, oboe, clarinet, bassoon, violin, viola, cello, double bass, percussion), op.41 (1967)
- Sextant, for wind quintet, op.42 (1969)
- Krásná zahradnice (The Beautiful Gardener) for brass quintet (2 trumpets, horn and 2 trombones), op.48 (1972–1973)
- Domina (Dominoes) for violin and percussion, op.54 (1976)
- Mahasarasvati (a.k.a. Fair Play), for harpsichord and 6 instruments (flute, oboe, clarinet, viola, cello, double bass), op.57 (1977–1978)
- Polarita (Polarity) for cello and prepared piano, op.58 (1978)
- The Last Supper (String Quartet No.4), op.59 (1979)
- Hieroglyfy (Hieroglyphs) for cimbalom, op.60 (1979)
- The Butterfly of Light for bass-clarinet and piano, op.64 (1983)

Vocal

- Three Sonnets from Shakespeare for bass and chamber orchestra, op.33 (1963)
