= War with the Salamanders (film) =

- Directed by: Aurel Klimt
- Based on: War with the Newts by Karel Čapek
- Starring: Jaroslav Dušek; Petr Čtvrtníček; Robert Nebřenský; Csongor Kassai; Lazar Ristovski; Ján Kvasnička
- Cinematography: Radek Loukota
- Music by: Vladimír Martinka
- Production companies: Studio Zvon; IN Film Praha; Czech Television; Slovak Television and Radio; Cinetim; Woodz Production
- Distributed by: CinemArt
- Running time: 118 minutes
- Countries: Czech Republic; Slovakia; Croatia
- Language: Czech
- Budget: 85 Million CZK

War with the Salamanders (Czech: Válka s mloky) is an upcoming Czech adventure science fiction film directed by and animator Aurel Klimt, based on the 1936 novel of the same name by Karel Čapek.

== Plot ==
The story follows the plot of Karel Čapek's novel. Captain Vantoch discovers a seemingly extinct species of giant salamander in the Pacific Ocean that shows signs of intelligence. Gradually, the captain and representatives of trading companies begin to make deals with them, where in exchange for knives they obtain pearls that the salamanders hunt in the seas. Gradually, the salamanders become cheap labor and the object of scientific research. However, with the help of humans, they also gain more and more power to gain domination over the human race.

== Cast ==
- Jaroslav Dušek as Captain Vantoch
- Petr Čtvrtníček as:
  - Andy, the Salamander
  - German ambassador
- Robert Nebřenský as G. H. Bondy
- Csongor Kassai
- Lazar Ristovski
- Ján Kvasnička

== Production ==
Director Tomáš Krejčí attempted to adapt Čapek's novel in 2011. The film was prepared as an international co-production. Agnieszka Holland was initially attached to the project as director but Krejčí eventually took over as director. The project was cancelled due to lack of finances.

War with the Salamanders is shot as a combined film using both classical and computer-generated film tricks (similar to the works of Karel Zeman). Real actors appear with computer-generated characters and animated backgrounds. The film's budget is around 85 million crowns, and the project was supported by the State Cinematography Fund with 14.5 million crowns. Shooting takes place in Croatia, Czech Republic and Slovakia. Shooting locations include Susak island, Thermal Pool of MUDr. Antonín Čapek in Trenčianske Teplice, Auditorium Maximus lecture hall in the Comenius University in Bratislava, the Bratislava Main Post Office, Prague's Villa Pod Kaštany with Art Nouveau elements, auditorium of the Anatomical Institute of the 1st Faculty of Medicine of Charles University in Prague. Large part of the film was shot in the Hexar studio in Chrášťany near Prague.
