= Zdeněk Folprecht =

Zdeněk Folprecht may refer to:

- Zdeněk Folprecht (footballer) (born 1991), Czech football right midfielder
- Zdeněk Folprecht (composer) (1900–1961), Czech composer and conductor
