= Arne Laurin =

Czech-Jewish journalist

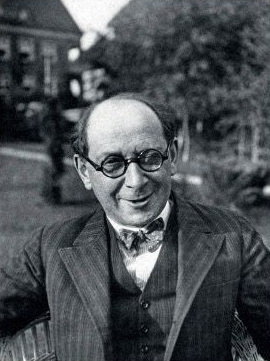

Arne Laurin (real name Arnošt Lustig; 1889 in Hrnčíře village, Praha-Šeberov, Prague – 17 February 1945 in New York City) was a Czech-Jewish journalist. He was the editor of the Prager Presse and one of Karel Čapek's Friday Men circle.

He is buried at the New Jewish Cemetery in Prague.
