= Friday Men =

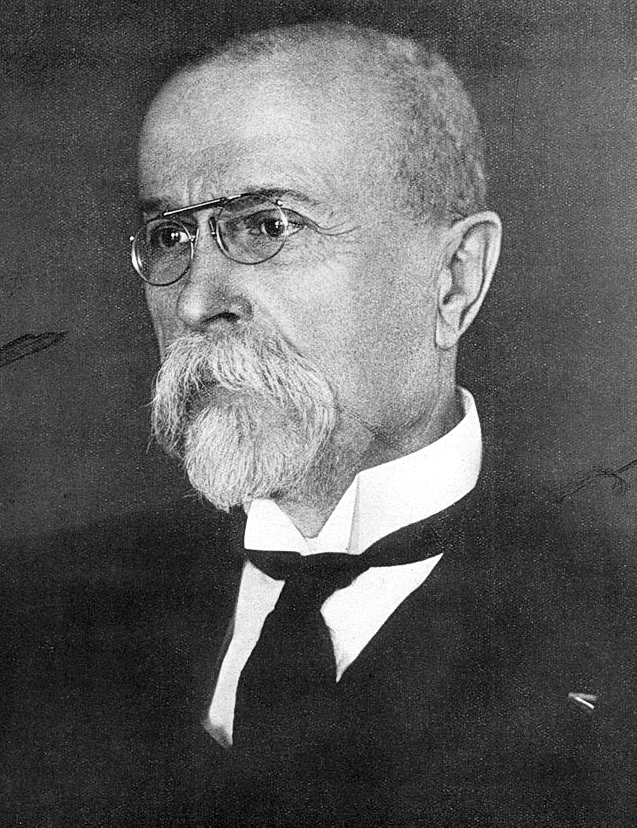
The meetings of Friday Men were attended by two Czechoslovak Presidents: Tomáš Garrigue Masaryk

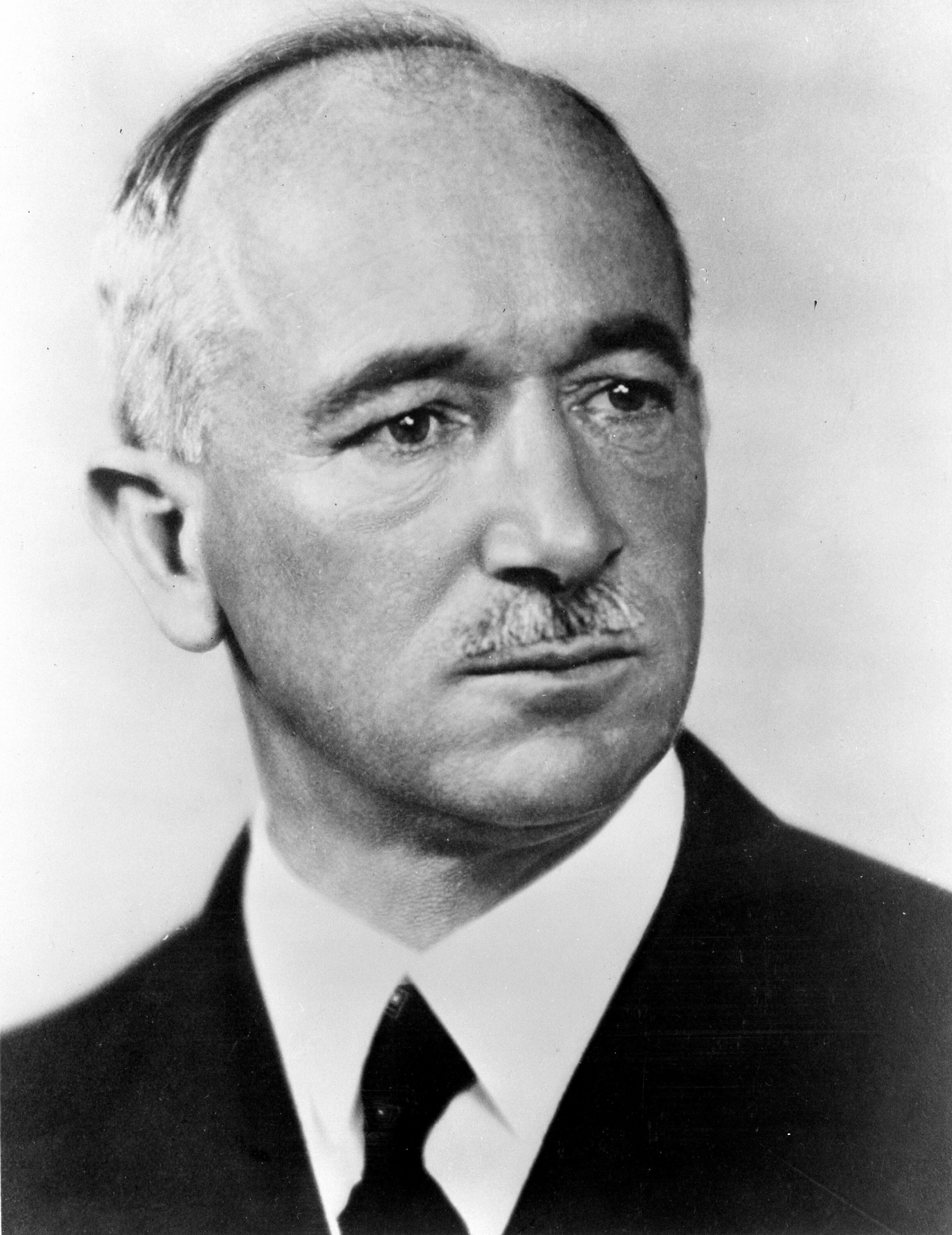
and Edvard Beneš, who joined after World War II, when Čapek's wife Olga Scheinpflugová attempted to revive the meetings.

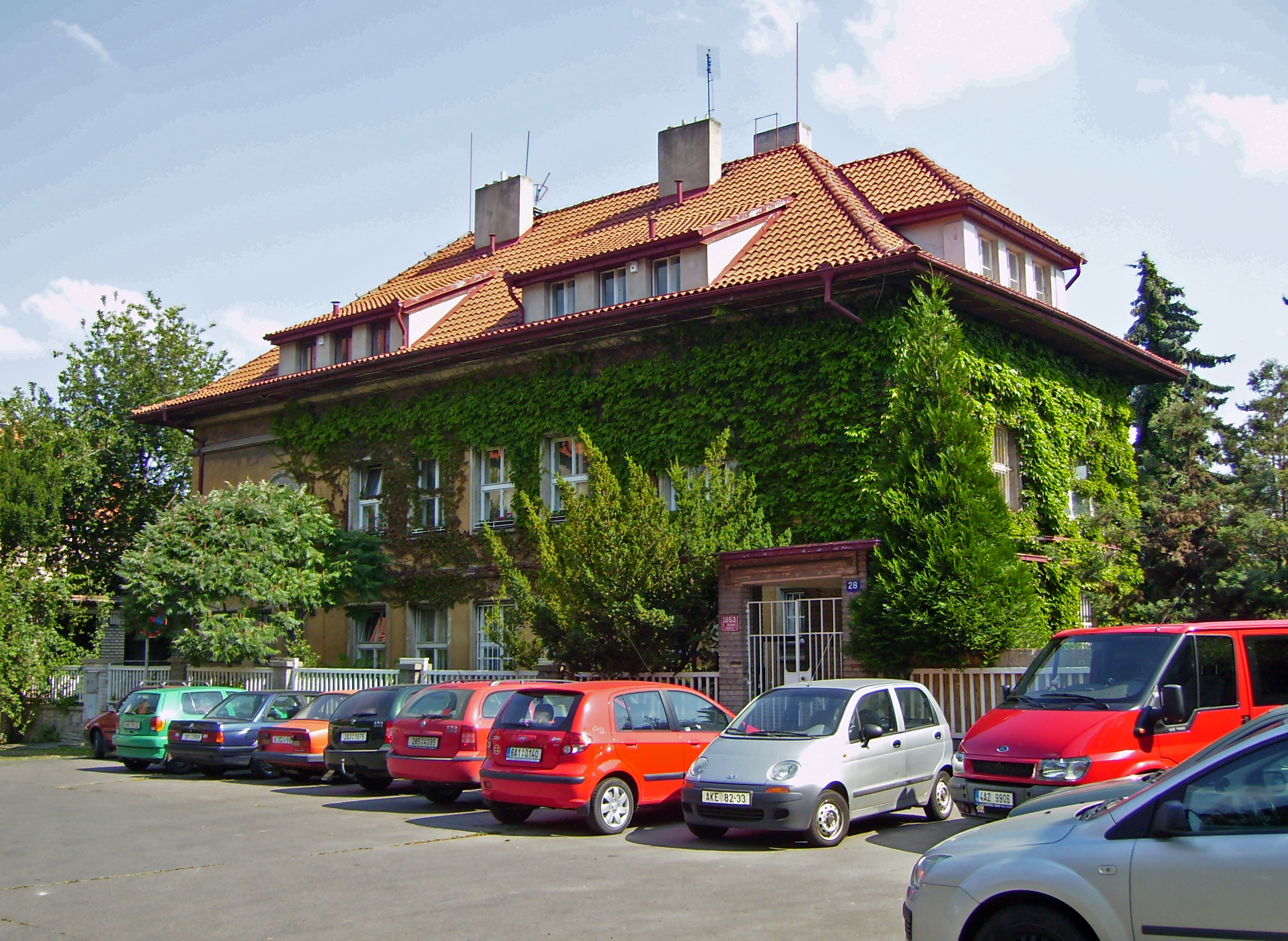
The meetings were held in the house of Čapek brothers in Prague 10, Vinohrady.

The Friday Men (Czech: Pátečníci, German: Die Freitagsrunde) were a Czech intellectual and political circle that met in the garden of Karel Čapek's Prague house on Friday afternoons from 1921 till Čapek's death in 1938. The group also sometimes met in Café Slavia.

A cartoon by Adolf Hoffmeister shows in the first row Ferdinand Peroutka, Jan Blahoslav Kozák, editor of the Prager Presse Arne Laurin, then in the second row: Karl Kraus, František Langer, Karel Čapek, theatre critic Josef Kodíček, Josef Macek, and then in the third row Josef Čapek, Vladislav Vančura, Tomáš Masaryk, Edvard Beneš, Karel Poláček, and finally in the fourth row journalist František Kubka, Josef Kopta, Dr. L. Procházka, Vilem Mathesius, and historian Josef Šusta. No women attended.

Čapek's wife Olga Scheinpflugová attempted to revive the meetings after World War II. Among post-war participants were Hugo Haas, Jaroslav Seifert, František Langer and Vlado Clementis.
