= Hordubal =

1933 novel by Karel Čapek

- Cover of the 1934 Borový edition
- Author: Karel Čapek
- Translator: Marie and Robert Weatherall
- Cover artist: František Muzika
- Language: Czech
- Genre: Novel
- Publisher: František Borový
- Publication date: 1933
- Publication place: Czechoslovakia
- Media type: Print (Hardcover)
- Pages: 249
- Followed by: Meteor

Hordubal (1933) is a novel by Czech writer Karel Čapek. Based on a true account published in the newspaper Lidove noviny where the author was a regular contributor, the story is ultimately concerned with the essential unknowability of the inner lives of others, and the impossibility of true communication among men. It is the first in a trilogy of what are known as Capek's "noetic novels," the other two being Meteor (1934) and An Ordinary Life (1934).

== Plot ==
The novel is divided into three parts. In the first part, Juraj Hordubal returns to his home village of Kriva in Carpathian Ruthenia after eight years of working as a coal miner in America. He is looking forward to seeing his devoted wife Polana and daughter Hafia. Everything is greatly idealised in his eyes as he expects everyone to welcome him warmly. However, the reality is different, he is accepted very coldly but hopes that things will get better soon and everyone will get used to his presence. He believes that Polana was a faithful wife during the time he was abroad. Unfortunately, he later discovers that she had an affair with the farm keeper Stepan Manya who was helping her with managing the farm.

The relationship between Hordubal and Manya becomes very tense and eventually, Manya is forced to leave the farm. That, however doesn't influence Manya's love affair with Polana. They still keep meeting despite the fact that Hordubal knows about the affair. Manya and Polana decide to get rid of Hordubal in order to begin a new life together. They are also motivated to do it as Hordubal's savings are big enough to ensure a convenient life for a long time. Hordubal is killed by Manya in the middle of the night. The ending of the book describes the investigation of the criminal act. All the evidence lead to Manya. He is sentenced to life. Polana is found guilty of planning the murder and is sentenced to twelve years in prison in spite of being pregnant. In the end, Polana's sinning is considered much more severe as she misused her husband's kindness and devotion and was unfaithful. The highly religious society detests her for her sins.

== English translation ==
Hordubal was translated into English by Maria and Robert Weatherall for Allen and Unwin in 1934.

The novel is written in a rhythmic style using a complex and innovative narrative technique, one which is particularly difficult to render in English: an internal monologue, which sometimes becomes an internal dialogue. In The Encyclopedia of Literary Translation into English James Partridge writes: "The Weatheralls capture Juraj Hordubal’s colloquial and uneducated speech . . . they find the appropriate language and stylistic register for the straight detective story and the courtroom drama following the novel’s events," while also praising the translators' accuracy and their ability to retain the rhythmic quality of the original Czech.

== Film adaptations ==
There have been two film adaptations:

- Hordubalové (1937), directed by Martin Frič
- Hordubal (1979), directed by Jaroslav Balík
