= Josef Nesvadba =

Czech writer

- Born: 19 June 1926; Prague
- Died: 26 April 2005 (aged 78); Prague
- Other names: Autor
- Occupation: Translator, psychotherapist, writer, psychiatrist

Josef Nesvadba (19 June 1926 – 26 April 2005) was a Czech writer, best known in the English-speaking world for his science fiction short stories, many of which have appeared in English translation.

== Biography ==
Josef Nesvadba was born in Prague, Czechoslovakia on 19 June 1926. In 1950, he graduated with a degree in medicine, specializing in psychiatry. He was a pioneer of group psychotherapy in Czechoslovakia and was a professor of psychiatry at Charles University.

Nesvadba originally translated poetry from English and wrote several theatrical plays as a student in the late 1940s and early 1950s. Towards the end of the 1950s, he began writing science fiction short stories. Befitting his background, psychiatry was often a theme in his science fiction. His stories typically revolved around such issues as human weakness and divided personalities, with a tendency toward dark humor, irony, and satire, as in "Vampires, Ltd.", in which a car runs on blood. In the 1970s, he began to move away from science fiction, which was likely inevitable, as his main interests diverged somewhat from Western views of the genre. From a commercial perspective, this did not work well.

Some of his stories were made into movies, including Death of Tarzan, The Half-wit of Xeenemunde, Vampires, Ltd., and Tomorrow I'll Wake Up and Scald Myself with Tea. In the last of these, which he himself scripted, Hitler and issues of causality cropped up. He also worked on several TV and radio serials.

Nesvadba's work directed satirical barbs at the communist government of Czechoslovakia, as he had little faith in the grandiose dreams of 20th-century Communism. However, he agreed overall with Marxist analysis, a viewpoint he maintained even after the unraveling of Communist rule in Czechoslovakia.

Nesvadba was registered as an agent of the Czechoslovak Communist secret police StB under the codename Autor.

Josef Nesvadba was married to Libuše Nesvadbová.

He died in Prague on 26 April 2005.

== Partial bibliography ==
=== Early theatrical plays ===
- Výprava do oceánie
- Ocelový kruh
- Ráno
- Tři podpisy

=== Novels ===
- Dialog s doktorem Dongem (Dialogue with Dr. Dong) (1964)
- Bludy Erika N. (Delusions of Erik N.) (1974)
- Tajná zpráva z Prahy (Secret News from Prague) (1978)
- Minehava podruhé (Minehava for the Second Time) (1981)
- Hledám za manžela muže (I Want a Man for My Husband) (1986)
- První zpráva z Prahy (The First News from Prague), uncensored original version of Tajná zpráva z Prahy(1991)
- Peklo Beneš (Beneš Hell) (2002)

=== Collections ===
- Tarzanova smrt (Tarzan's Death) (1958)
- Einsteinův mozek (Einstein's Brain) (1960)
- Výprava opačným směrem (Expedition in the Opposite Direction) (1962)
- Vampires, Ltd. (1964)
- Vynález proti sobě (In the Footsteps of the Abominable Snowman) (1964; English translation 1970)
- Výpravy opačným směrem (Expeditions in the Opposite Direction) (1976)
- Einsteinův mozek a jiné povídky (Einstein's Brain and Other Stories) (1987)

=== Short stories ===
- "Pirate Island" (1958)
- "The Einstein Brain" (1962)
- "The Xeenemuende Half-Wit" (1962)(Blbec z Xeenemünde, 1960), about an idiot savant who invented rocket weapons during World War II. A 1964 Czechoslovak film was based on the story.
- "Captain Nemo's Last Adventure" (1964)
- "The Last Secret Weapon of the Third Reich" (1964)
- "Vampires Ltd." (1964)
- "The Lost Face" (1964)
- "In the Footsteps of the Abominable Snowman" (1964)
- "Doctor Moreau's Other Island" (1964)
- "Inventor of His Own Undoing" (1964)
- "The Chemical Formula of Destiny" (1964)
- "Expedition in the Opposite Direction" (1964)
- "The Trial Nobody Ever Heard Of" (1971)
- "The Death of an Apeman" (1971)
- "The Divided Carla" (1985)
- "The Storeroom of Lost Desire" (1989)
- "Horribly Beautiful, Beautifully Horrible" (1993)

=== Nonfiction ===
- "That Moon Plaque (Men on the Moon)" (1969)
- "Reason and Rationalism" (1984)

== See also ==
- Czech science fiction and fantasy
