= Život a dílo skladatele Foltýna =

Unfinished novel by Karel Čapek

- First edition
- Author: Karel Čapek
- Language: Czech
- Genre: Novel
- Publication date: 1939

Život a dílo skladatele Foltýna (Life and Work of the Composer Foltýn) is an unfinished Czech novel, written by Karel Čapek. It was first published posthumously in 1939. It is a fictional biography of a composer Bedřich Foltýn (pseudonym Beda Folten), who perceives himself as a genius and is hopelessly obsessed with an idea to become a great artist and to write a big opera about Biblical Judith. Unable to finish this goal because of a lack of talent, he plagiarizes works of talented young music students and poor poets and joins these musical and poetic scraps into an opera. In the end, his "friends" make a deriding performance of his opus magnum and Foltýn, realizing his impotency and aimlessness, goes mad and dies. The novel is interesting because of its literary form, being a cycle of "testimonies" narrated by Foltýn's friends and wife, each of them having totally different opinion about his life. The novel was translated into English as The Cheat and published in 1941 by George Allen & Unwin in London.
