= Svatby pana Voka =

1970 film

- Directed by: Karel Steklý
- Written by: Jan Procházka; Karel Steklý
- Starring: Miloš Kopecký
- Release date: 1970
- Running time: 100 minutes
- Country: Czechoslovakia
- Language: Czech

Svatby pana Voka (transl.Weddings of Mr. Vok) is a 1970 Czechoslovak comedy film describing love adventures of the Bohemian nobleman Peter Vok of Rosenberg. The screenplay was written by Jan Procházka and it was directed by Karel Steklý.

== Cast ==
- Miloš Kopecký as Peter Vok of Rosenberg
- Pavel Landovský as the Emperor Rudolph II
- Karel Augusta as countryman Prokop
- Stanislava Bartošová as a girl Madlenka
- Vlastimil Bedrna as armoured man at the bridge
- Karel Bělohradský as nobleman on a horse
- Jana Bittlová as innkeeper
- Vladimír Brabec as chancellor Slavata
- Václav Brichnáč as servant
- Otakar Brousek Sr. as William of Rosenberg
