= Zuzana Vojířová =

Zuzana Vojířová is an opera by Jiří Pauer to the composer's own libretto after the play of the same name by Jan Bor, which is itself based on a romance by František Kubka. The plot concerns the folk tale of nobleman Peter Vok's 30-year-long illicit romance with the miller-knight's daughter Zuzana Vojířová. The opera was written in a Janáček-like idiom and became one of the most successful post-war Czech operas, with 120 performances in Prague alone - long the most performed modern Czech opera.

== Recording ==
- Complete recording 1979. Gabriela Beňačková-Čápová, soprano, Václav Zítek, baritone. Prague Radio Chorus and Prague National Theatre Orchestra. sv:František Vajnar, conductor. 3 LPs with libretto in Czech and English translation.
