= Josef Kodíček =

Czech journalist and theatre critic (1892-1954)

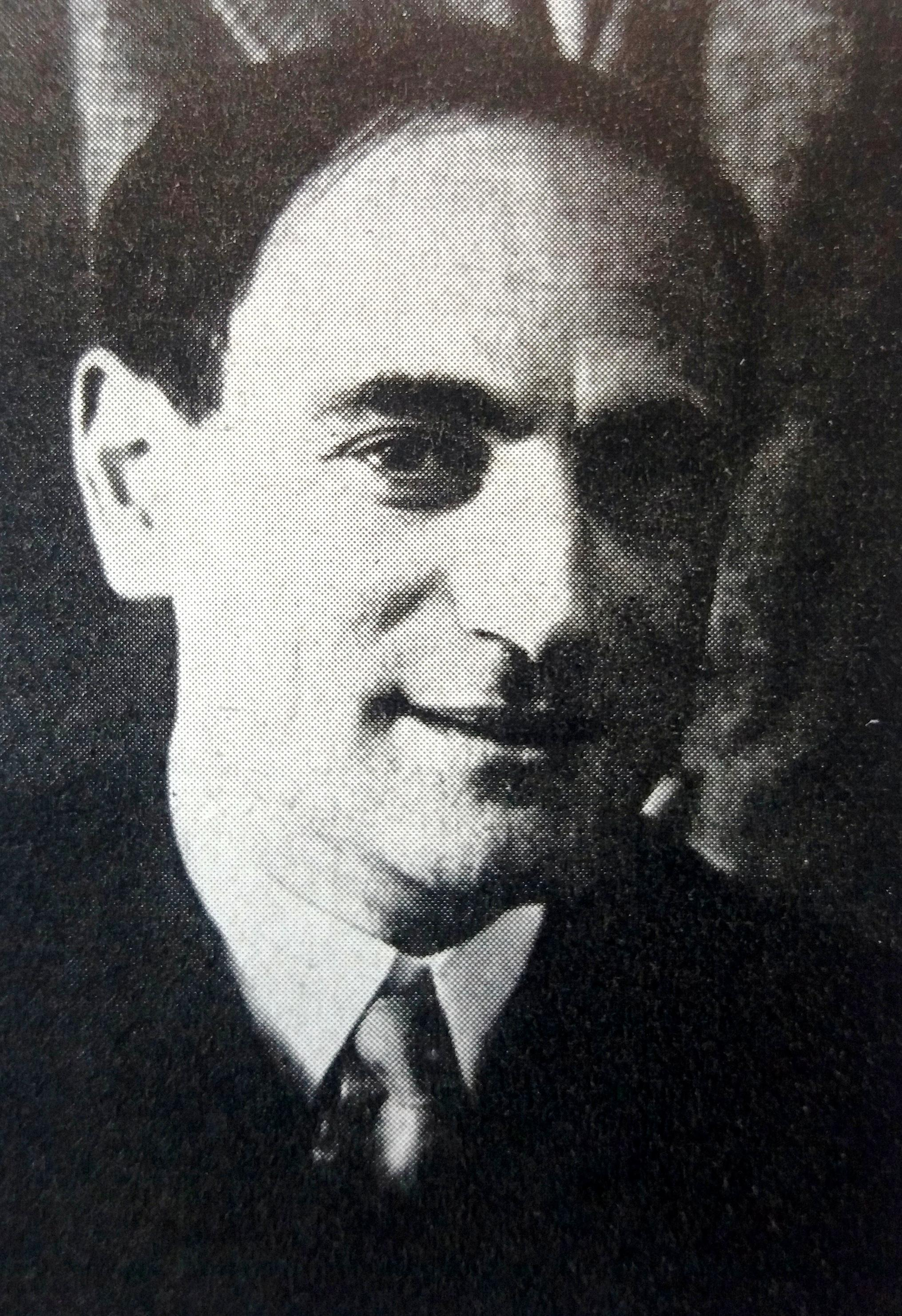
- Josef Kodíček, Czech theatre director and critic
- Born: January 24, 1892
- Died: November 1954 (aged 62)
- Occupations: Journalist and theatre critic
- Known for: Part of the Friday Men circle

Josef Kodíček (24 January 1892 – November 1954) was a Czech journalist and theatre critic. During the 1930s, he was part of the Friday Men circle which used to meet at Karel Čapek's house in Prague.
