= The Absolute at Large =

1922 novel by Karel Čapek

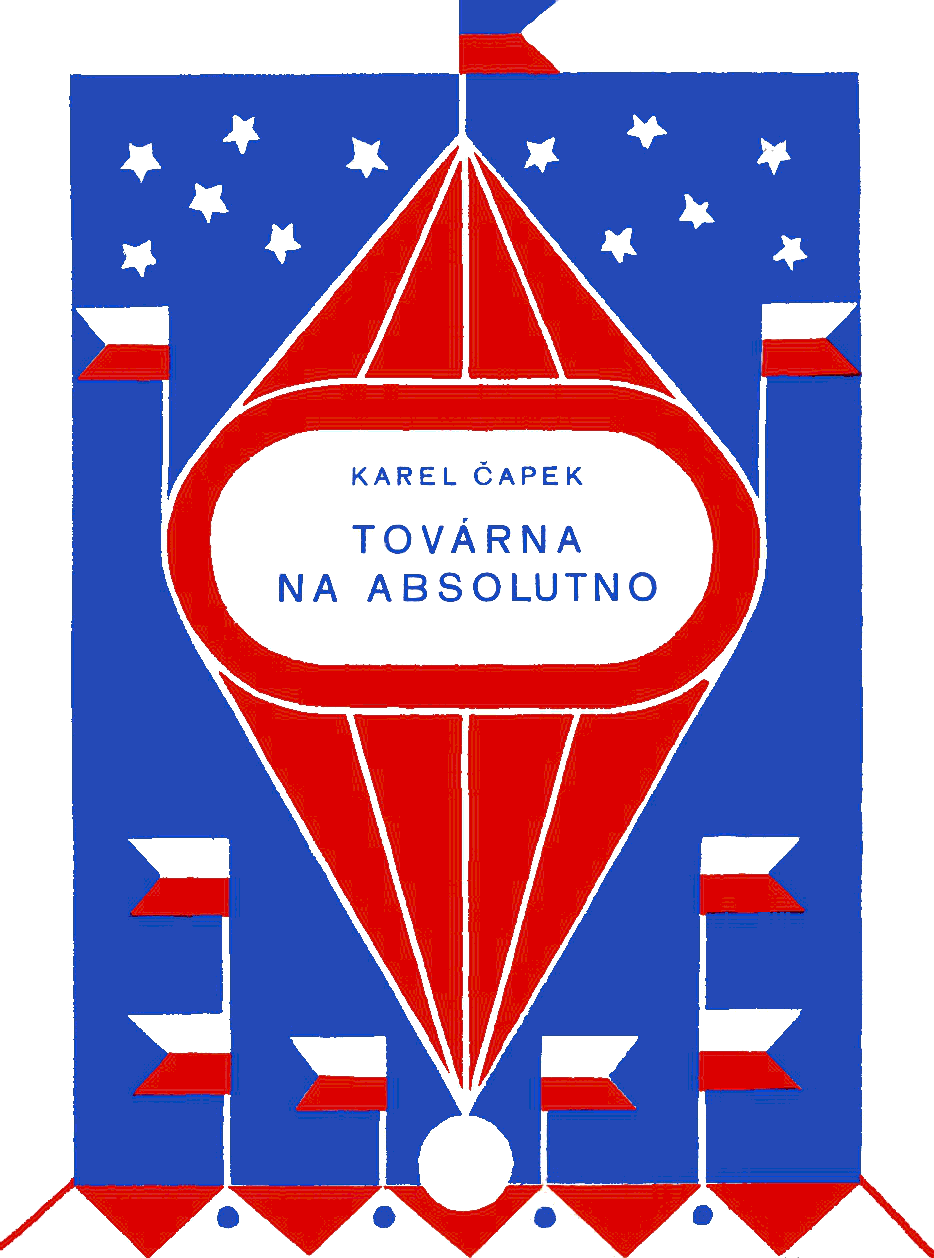
- Czech edition
- Author: Karel Čapek
- Original title: Továrna na absolutno
- Language: Czech
- Genre: Science fiction
- Publication date: 1922
- English publication date: 1927
- Media type: Print
- Text: The Absolute at Large at Wikisource

The Absolute at Large (Továrna na absolutno in the original Czech, literally translated as The Factory for the Absolute), is a science fiction novel written by Czech author Karel Čapek in 1922. The first sentence opens the story on New Year's Day 1943—a future date at the time of writing—and describes the fundamental transformations in society as the result of a new mystical source of virtually free energy.

== Plot ==
The story centers on the invention of a reactor that can annihilate matter to produce cheap and abundant energy. Unfortunately, it produces something else as a by-product, the absolute. The absolute is a spiritual essence that according to some religious philosophies permeates all matter. It is associated with human religious experience, as an unsuspecting humanity is to find out all too soon in the story. The widespread adoption of the reactors cause an enormous outpouring of pure absolute into the world. This leads to an outburst of religious and nationalist fervor, causing the greatest, most global war in history.

Čapek describes this war in a self-consciously absurd manner. Characteristic of the war are distant military marches, hence for example "battles of the Macedonia comitadjis with the Senegalese riflemen on the shores of the Finnish lakes." Some of the more prominent political changes the war causes include expulsion of the Russian army to Africa (via Europe) by the Chinese invasion, the conquest of East Asia by Japan that cuts the Chinese conquests in Russia and Europe down to the limits of the former Austro-Hungarian empire, and the Japanese conquest of North America. (The latter was able to occur because the United States were exhausted by a bloody civil war between the supporters and opponents of the Prohibition.)

Absolute does more than affect minds. It also does physical work. During the war, it causes catastrophes against the enemy (various parts of absolute support any given side in the conflict). At some point, it also becomes interested in production of material goods and produces them, in a supernatural manner, in enormous quantities. This leads to economic collapse and, absurdly enough, deficit of all manufactured items because, allegedly, once the price of goods has dropped to zero because of absolute, nobody cares to produce or distribute them any more. Starvation is averted because although absolute does not produce food, the peasants who do naturally do not let the price drop to zero. In fact they force every last penny from the urban population in return for food, hence saving humanity.

== Critical reception ==
R. D. Mullen called the novel "one of the genuine masterpieces of SF", but noted that "it has surely had no great influence on popular SF".

== See also ==
- The Absolute
