= Peter Vok of Rosenberg =

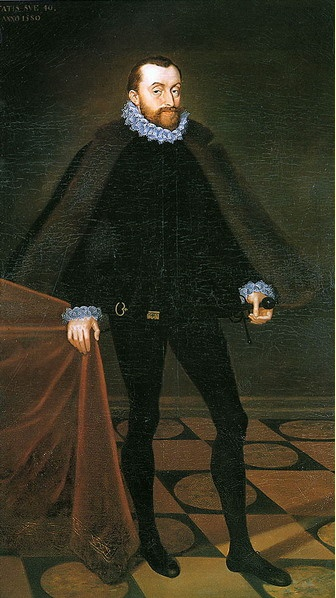
Petr Vok

Peter Vok of Rosenberg (Czech: Petr Vok z Rožmberka; 1 October 1539 – 6 November 1611) was a nobleman of the House of Rosenberg, descended from the Vítkovci. Rožmberk was a leading Protestant in the unsettled years before Battle of White Mountain.

== Life ==
Peter Vok was born in Český Krumlov, the son of Jošt III of Rosenberg, then head of the house of Rožmberk, and his wife Anna of Rogendorf. Fourteen days after Peter's birth, his father died. Peter came under the guardianship of first his uncle Petr V of Rosenberg and later Albrecht of Gutnštejn, Oldřich Holický of Sternberg and Jeroným Schlick.

He received his early education at home in the castle at Český Krumlov. Even as he reached adulthood, Peter lived in the shadow of his older brother William. While William was a life-long Catholic, Peter sympathised with Utraquism and eventually joined the Unity of the Brethren. William died in 1592, and Peter inherited the Rosenberg holdings.

Aged forty, Peter married the much younger Kateřina of Ludanice. Initially an idyllic marriage, with the young Kateřina appreciating the attention paid her by her aging husband, the union began to break down, in part because of Kateřina's worsening mental illness. The couple had no children, and the Rosenberg line ended with Peter Vok. He died, aged 72, in Třeboň in 1611 and was buried in a Rosenberg tomb in the Vyšší Brod Monastery. Shortly after Peter's death, his nephew Jan Zrinský of Seryn also died, and as such the whole Rosenberg dominions passed to the Švamberk family.

== In popular culture ==
After his death, Peter Vok became the subject of popular legends which characterized him as a generous benefactor and an exemplary Renaissance cavalier. In the modern imagination, he is thought of above all as a lovable rake.

His romance with the miller-knight's daughter Zuzana Vojířová is the subject of several stories and the opera Zuzana Vojířová by Jiří Pauer.

Svatby pana Voka (1970) is a comedy film describing love adventures of Peter Vok. The screenplay was written by Jan Procházka and it was directed by Karel Steklý.
