= Krakatit =

- Theatrical release poster
- Directed by: Otakar Vávra
- Screenplay by: Otakar Vávra; Jaroslav Vávra
- Based on: Krakatit by Karel Čapek
- Produced by: Otakar Vávra
- Starring: Karel Höger
- Cinematography: Václav Hanuš
- Edited by: Antonín Zelenka
- Music by: Jiří Srnka
- Release date: 9 April 1948
- Running time: 110 minutes
- Country: Czechoslovakia
- Language: Czech

Krakatit is a 1948 Czechoslovak science fiction mystery film directed by Otakar Vávra, starring Karel Höger as a chemist who experiences delirium and regret after inventing a powerful explosive. The film is based on Karel Čapek's novel with the same title, written in 1922. The name is derived from the volcano Krakatoa, which violently erupted in 1883.

== Plot ==
A barely conscious, unidentified man is given intensive care by a doctor and a nurse. The man's hands are badly burned and cut. The doctor tells the nurse to give the man oxygen.

A sequence begins where the man walks along a street while in a delirium. An old classmate, Jiří Tomeš, greets him and we learn that the man's name is Prokop. He speaks incoherently about an explosion and something he calls krakatit. Jiří brings him home and puts him in bed. In a dream, a university professor asks Prokop about krakatit. He answers that it is a powerful explosive, named after the volcano Krakatoa, and explains its formula. As the dream ends we see that Jiří has written the formula down. Prokop wakes up alone in Jiří's apartment. He finds a note which says that Jiří has gone to see his father. Prokop opens the door when a veiled woman rings the bell. She begs Prokop to deliver a letter to Jiří. Prokop, still not recovered, decides to visit Jiří's father, a countryside doctor. An old mail carrier driving a horse carriage in the snow gives Prokop a lift to help him visit Jiří´s father. Upon arriving he learns that Jiří has not visited his father in a long time and then Prokop collapses suddenly.

Tended by the doctor and his daughter Anči, Prokop slowly recovers, but cannot recall what has happened. One day he reads in a newspaper a story about krakatit, which is being promoted by someone named Carson, and Prokop suddenly remembers the explosion in his laboratory. He rushes to the laboratory where he meets Carson, a representative from Balttin Works, a foreign weapon manufacturer. Carson explains that Jiří had sold them Prokop's stock of krakatit and the formula, and that their experiments with krakatit have shown that it is a highly dangerous explosive which can be detonated remotely from a great distance with high-frequency radio signals. However, while they have the formula, they have failed to figure out the production procedure, and offer Prokop employment so he can work on their research. Prokop declines, but is brought to the Balttin palace by force and is set to work in a chemical laboratory.

At the palace Prokop begins a romance with a princess whose name is Wilhelmina Hagen. Meanwhile, he realizes he actually is in love with the veiled woman from Jiří's apartment. The Balttin executive offers that he will arrange Prokop's marriage to the princess if the chemist gives them krakatit. In anger, Prokop blows up the laboratory where he has been held captive, and with his coat loaded with explosives he confronts the princess, whose face dissolves. Prokop escapes from the palace with help from an ambassador named d'Hémon. They then visit a secret society of former world leaders and weapon dealers, who worship war and hail Prokop as Comrade Krakatit. As tumult breaks out, a can of krakatit, originally from Prokop's old laboratory, is emptied and the members fight to gather some of the powder for themselves. Prokop and d'Hémon leave and briefly run into the veiled woman.

D'Hémon brings Prokop to the top of a hill composed of magnetite, where Prokop's old laboratory has been relocated and turned into a secret radio station. They enter and d'Hémon makes Prokop push a button. This causes stockpiles of krakatit to explode in many capital cities of Europe, as thunderous detonations are heard in the distance. D'Hémon explains that the explosions are certain to trigger a great war which can be controlled from the radio station with krakatit. Prokop becomes furious and screams at d'Hémon, who disappears before his eyes.

Prokop finds himself in a desolate, concrete landscape. He comes upon an enclosed factory, where he asks to see Jiří Tomeš. His requests is rejected, but he is allowed to meet a lab assistant, to whom he gives the letter from the veiled woman. Prokop walks away from the factory. After a while he sees it explode in the distance. The old mail carrier appears and gives Prokop a lift. The driver suggest Prokop should invent something that makes people's lives easier instead of killing people. Back at the hospital from the first scene, the doctor says that the patient now is breathing normally and the oxygen mask can be removed.

== Cast ==
- Karel Höger as Prokop
- Florence Marly as Princess Wilhelmina Hagen
- Eduard Linkers as Carson
- Jiří Plachý as d'Hémon
- Nataša Tanská as Anči Tomeš
- František Smolík as Dr. Tomeš
- Miroslav Homola as Jiří Tomeš
- Vlasta Fabianová as the veiled woman / the revolutionist woman
- Jaroslav Průcha as old mail carrier
- Jiřina Petrovická as the nurse
- Jaroslav Zrotal as the doctor
- Bedřich Vrbský as Baron Rohn
- Bohuš Hradil as Holz

== Reception ==
The film premiered in Czechoslovakia on 9 April 1948. In 1951 it was released in the United States by Artkino Pictures. In The New York Times, the film was called "a strident preachment for peace and against destructive nuclear fission, but basically it is clouded and halting drama." The critic wrote favourably about the performances of Höger, Marly, Tanská and Linkers, but felt: "Despite the adequate English subtitles, the rest of the cast moves through the scientist's dream world much like the robots invented by Čapek in R. U. R. They can't be blamed however, for Krakatit is sapped by a surfeit of symbolism."

"Wear." of Variety found Florence Marly's performance "especially good" and the supporting cast was "unusually strong" while finding Vavra's direction "uneven, being routine in earlier passages and near the climax, but topnotch on the straight melodramatics." The review also praised the camera work of Vaclav Hanus and Kiri Srnka's musical score as "weird and unusual enough to fit the subject matter."
