= War with the Newts =

1936 novel by Karel Čapek

- Cover of 1955 Bantam paperback edition
- Author: Karel Čapek
- Original title: Válka s Mloky
- Language: Czech
- Genre: Satirical Science fiction novel
- Publisher: Fr. Borový, Prague
- Publication date: 1936
- Publication place: Czechoslovakia
- English publication date: 1937, Allen & Unwin, London
- Media type: Print (Hardback & Paperback)
- Pages: 240 (1990 Catbird Press edition)

War with the Newts (Válka s Mloky in the original Czech), also translated as Salamander Wars, is a 1936 satirical science fiction novel by Czech author Karel Čapek. It concerns the discovery in the Indian Ocean of a sea-dwelling race, an intelligent breed of newts, who are initially enslaved and exploited. They acquire human knowledge and rebel, leading to a global war for supremacy. There are obvious similarities to Čapek's earlier R.U.R., but also some original themes.

War with the Newts was described as a "classic work" of science fiction by science fiction author and critic Damon Knight.

== Plot summary ==
Only the last four of the book's 27 chapters deal with the eponymous war. The rest of the book is concerned with the discovery of the Newts, their exploitation and evolution, and growing tensions between humans and the Newts in the lead-up to the war.

The book does not have any single protagonist, but instead looks at the development of the Newts from a broad societal perspective. At various points the narrator's register seems to slip into that of a journalist, historian or anthropologist. The three most central characters are Captain J. van Toch, the seaman who discovers the Newts; Mr Gussie H. Bondy, the industrialist who leads the development of the Newt industry; and Mr Povondra, Mr Bondy's doorman. They all reoccur throughout the book, but none can be said to drive the narrative in any significant way. All three are Czech.

The novel is divided into three sections or 'books'.

=== Book One – Andrias Scheuchzeri ===
The first section recounts Captain van Toch's discovery of the Newts on Tanahmasa, a small island near Sumatra, their initial exploitation in the service of pearl farming, the beginning of their spread around the oceans of the world, and the development of their speech and absorption of human culture. The section closes with the founding of The Salamander Syndicate, an ambitious plan developed by Mr Bondy to redirect Newt resources away from the declining pearl industry and into larger hydroengineering projects. Though this is the close of the narrative development of this section, after it there is a further appendix entitled 'The Sex Life of the Newts'. This examines the Newts' sexuality and reproductive processes in a pastiche of academese.

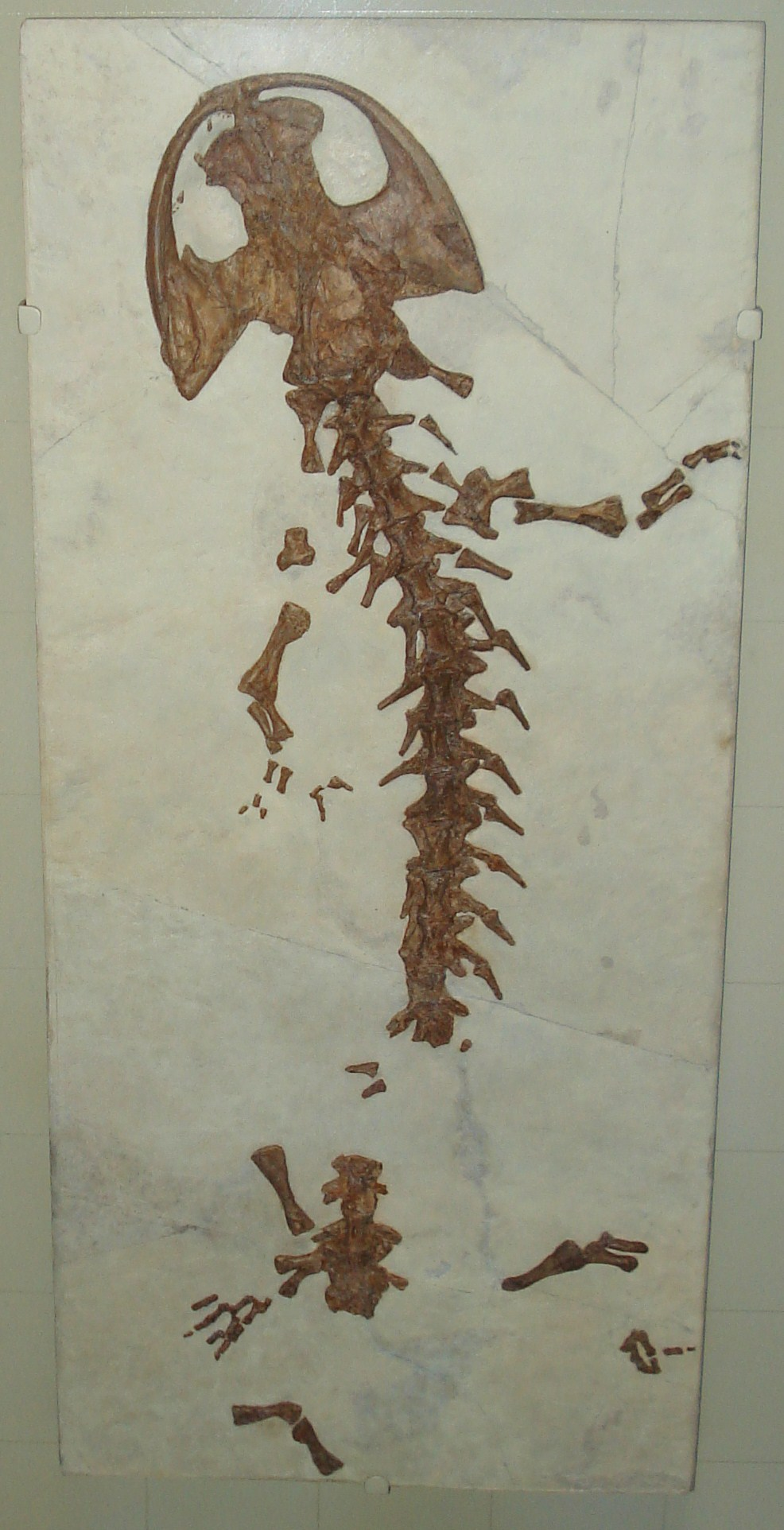
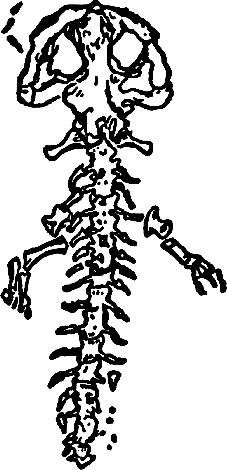
Fossil of the extinct giant salamander Andrias scheuchzeri, the basis for Čapek's newts, compared to the illustration from the book

The tone of the first section is generally light-hearted satire, in contrast to the darker tone of later parts of the story. Čapek targets a range of human foibles, from the superficiality of Hollywood starlets, to the arrogance of prevalent European attitudes towards non-white races. He also skewers the self-assuredness of science; scientists are repeatedly seen underestimating the capabilities of the Newts and falsely assessing other related issues, always in full confidence of the validity of their claims.

=== Book Two – Up the Ladder of Civilization ===
The second section concerns the development of the Newts from the founding of The Salamander Syndicate to the outbreak of the first hostilities between Newts and humans. It contains only three chapters: one long one – by far the longest in the novel – bookended by two short ones. In the first chapter Mr. Povondra begins collecting newspaper clippings concerning the Newts. The long middle chapter then takes the form of a historical essay written at some unspecified time in the future. The essay cites Mr. Povondra's clippings as its main source of historical evidence, and includes a number of footnotes and quotations from his collection. The third chapter returns to the Povondra household a number of years after the events of the first chapter and introduces an early Newt–human conflict.

=== Book Three – War with the Newts ===
The final section reverts to the same form as the first section, but with a darker tone. It relates a series of skirmishes between Newts and humans, eventually resulting in the outbreak of war when the Newts declare their need to destroy portions of the world's continents in order to create new coastlines and so expand their living space. Čapek's satirical targets here are mainly nationalism (the British, French and Germans are all portrayed as irredeemably stubborn and nationalistic), German racial theories (see below), and the perceived inefficacy of international diplomacy. In the penultimate chapter, the tone becomes didactic: "We are all responsible for it", declares Čapek's mouthpiece, Mr. Povondra's adult son.

The last chapter, entitled "The Author Talks to Himself", takes a metafictional turn. With Earth's landmass one-fifth destroyed and humanity offering little resistance, the chapter cuts away from the action to a conversation between two personas of the author, called the Author and the Writer. Between them they map out the long-term history of the Newts: the Newts will all but destroy the Earth's landmass, leaving only a tiny clump of humanity to work for them in their factories. Eventually they will form separate countries and destroy themselves by committing the same follies as humanity; humans will then inherit what remains of the earth; new continents will arise, and "America" will be dimly remembered as an Atlantis-like mythical land.

== Background ==
By the early 1930s, the author's country of Czechoslovakia was in a precarious political situation. Čapek became concerned by the developments of National Socialism in Germany. He began writing his Apocryphal Tales, short allegorical pieces that picked up on the anxiety felt by many Czechoslovaks at the time. These may have provided the impetus for War with the Newts, which was written over four months in the summer of 1935.

He describes the initial thought of the novel as, "you mustn't think that the evolution that gave rise to our form of life was the only evolutionary process on the planet". On 27 August 1935, Čapek wrote, "Today I completed the last chapter of my utopian novel. The protagonist of this chapter is nationalism. The content is quite simple: the destruction of the world and its people. It is a disgusting chapter, based solely on logic. Yet it had to end this way. What destroys us will not be a cosmic catastrophe but mere reasons of state, economics, prestige, etc."

== As satire and social commentary ==
The book is a dark satire, poking fun extensively at the contemporary European politics, including colonialism, fascism and Nazism, segregation in America, and the arms race. A notable satirical point is the mentioned research of a German scientist who has determined that the German Newts are actually a superior Nordic race, and that as such they have a right to expand their living space at the expense of the inferior breeds of Newts.

The author's opinion of the United States' social problems also appears very pessimistic, as whenever that country is mentioned as dealing with a crisis, American mobs "lynch negroes" as scapegoats. Sometimes the Newts are shown in the same manner as the blacks, as when a white woman claims to have been raped by one of them. Despite the physical impossibility of the act, people believe her and carry out Newt lynchings.

One passage, depicting the European nations willing to hand over China to the Newts as long as they are themselves spared and overriding the Chinese's desperate protests, seems a premonition of the Munich Agreement, three years after the book was written – in which the writer's own country suffered a similar fate in a futile effort to appease the Nazis. It is also likely referencing the muted international response to Japan's invasion of the Chinese region of Manchuria in 1931 before a full invasion of China in 1937.

Another passage seems to mock parochialism and isolationism. Czechs are following news of the Newts' advances and conquests with a distant interest, feeling that as a landlocked country far from any sea they themselves have nothing to worry – until the day that a Newt is seen swimming in Prague's own Vltava River, and the Czechs suddenly realize that they are the next target.

Darko Suvin has described War with the Newts as "the pioneer of all anti-fascist and anti-militarist SF".

== Translations ==
The novel was translated into several languages within a year of its first publication. During the Second World War, it was blacklisted by the Nazis in 1940 in Germany and in 1941 by Nazi-occupied Norway.

War with the Newts has been translated into English at least three times. Reviewers describe the 1937 Allen & Unwin translation by the husband-and-wife team of Marie and Robert Weatherall as competent but uninspired. The language of the era is preserved, but some of Čapek's literary techniques are obscured. The 1985 translation, by the Czech Ewald Osers, is regarded by many reviewers as superior, capturing the crispness and strong metaphors of the original. This translation was supported by the UNESCO Collection of Representative Works. Veteran Kafka translator David Wyllie completed another translation. New translations in Russian, Polish, French, German, Dutch, Norwegian, Spanish, Swedish, and Hungarian have appeared since the 1960s.

== Adaptations ==
In 1981 Kenny Murray and Ken Campbell adapted the story into a play, which was performed at the Everyman Theatre in Liverpool. A 2003 production, based on the English translation by Ewald Osers, was adapted for the stage by E.B. Solomon and performed at the Kennedy Center's Prelude Festival and later at The Catholic University of America and the Mead Theatre Lab. In 2010, an adaptation by Jason Loewith and Justin D.M. Palmer (in collaboration with puppet designer Michael Montenegro) was performed at Next Theatre in Evanston, Illinois.

In 1981, Ken Campbell directed War With the Newts at the Riverside Studios in Hammersmith, London. With Henry Davis, Txi Whizz; consultant, Nigel Bourne

In 1998, Stephan Koplowitz directed/choreographed/produced a movement/theater/music production of War With the Newts at Dance Theater Workshop, the script was adapted by David Lindsay-Abaire, with music by Andrew Warshaw.

In 2005 a BBC Radio adaption was produced, starring Dermot Crowley, Sally Hawkins, Henry Goodman, Geoffrey Beevers, Tina Gray, and Adrian Scarborough.

In 2022, a musical podcast titled Newts! was produced by PRX and The Truth, co-created by Ian Coss and Sam Jay Gold.

Robert Zubrin has said that his 2003 novel The Holy Land, a satire on the Middle East conflict and the War on Terror, was inspired by The War with the Newts.

In Jaroslav Kalfař's 2023 novel A Brief History of Living Forever the main character is the leading actress in a film adaptation called The Great Newt War.

An animated film adaptation directed by Czech director Aurel Klimt was being developed.

The video game Hrot includes a level heavily inspired by War with the Newts.

== Reception ==
Dave Langford reviewed War with the Newts for White Dwarf #74, and stated that "Čapek's sophisticated wit converts what could be a plodding satire into something painfully funny."

== Reviews ==
- Review by George D. Martindale (1955) in Inside and Science Fiction Advertiser, May 1955
- Review by Anthony Boucher (1955) in The Magazine of Fantasy and Science Fiction, July 1955
- Review by Damon Knight (1955) in Science Fiction Stories, July 1955
- Review by P. Schuyler Miller (1968) in Analog Science Fiction and Science Fact, February 1968
- Review by Tony Sudbery (1969) in Vector 54 Autumn 1969
- Review by Allan Danzig (1976) in The Science Fiction Review Monthly, January 1976
- Review by uncredited (1976) in The Science Fiction Review Monthly, September 1976
- Review by Don D'Ammassa (1977) in Delap's F & SF Review, June 1977
- Review by Brian Stableford (1986) in Fantasy Review, February 1986
- Review by Denise Gorse (1986) in Paperback Inferno, #60
- Review by Chris Morgan (1986) in Vector 132
- Review by Baird Searles (1991) in Isaac Asimov's Science Fiction Magazine, September 1991
- Review by Rhys Hughes (2014) in Big Sky, #4: SF Masterworks 2

== See also ==
- Czech literature
