= Prager Presse =

The Prager Presse (Prague press) was a German newspaper published in the Czechoslovak Republic from March 1921 to 1939.

== History ==
The newspaper Prager Presse was founded by Tomáš Garrigue Masaryk with the aim of integrating the German-speaking minority, which at that time had a share of 22.5% of the population. Arne Laurin was editor from 1921 to 1938. His colleague in the feuilleton was Otto Pick (1887, Prague –1940, London) from 1921 to 1939.
