= Marie and Robert Weatherall =

Marie and Robert Weatherall were a married couple who collaborated in translating the work of Karel Čapek into English.

Marie Anna Caroline Weatherall, née Isakovicsová (1897 – 15 May 1972) was from Czechoslovakia. Educated at Prague University, Marie had obtained her doctorate and married Robert Weatherall by 1927, when she published an article on Walter Pater in a Czechoslovak philological journal.

Robert Weatherall (1899 – 27 September 1973, Barham, Kent) was educated at Cambridge University before becoming a biology master at Rugby School. Weatherall subsequently taught at Eton College. An active participant in the social hygiene movement, he was on the board of the British Social Biology Council for nearly four decades, and co-editor of their journal Biology and Human Affairs. In 1944, as secretary of the Education Advisory Board of the Social Hygiene Council, Weatherall proposed the setting up of a national public service to collect, wash and return diapers within 24 hours.

== Translations ==
(incomplete list)

- Jan Welzl, The Quest for Polar Treasures. Translated by M. & R. Weatherall, London, George Allen & Unwin Ltd., 1933
- Karel Čapek, War with the Newts. Translated by M. & R. Weatherall, New York, G.P. Putnam & Sons, 1937
- Tomáš Garrigue Masaryk and Karel Čapek, Masaryk on thought and life : conversations with Karel Čapek; translated from the Czech by M. & R. Weatherall, London: G. Allen & Unwin, 1938
- Karel Čapek, I had a dog and a cat, translated by M. & R. Weatherall, 1940
- Karel Čapek, Three novels: Hordubal, An ordinary life, Meteor. Tr. by M. and R. Weatherall, 1948
