= Jiří Pauer =

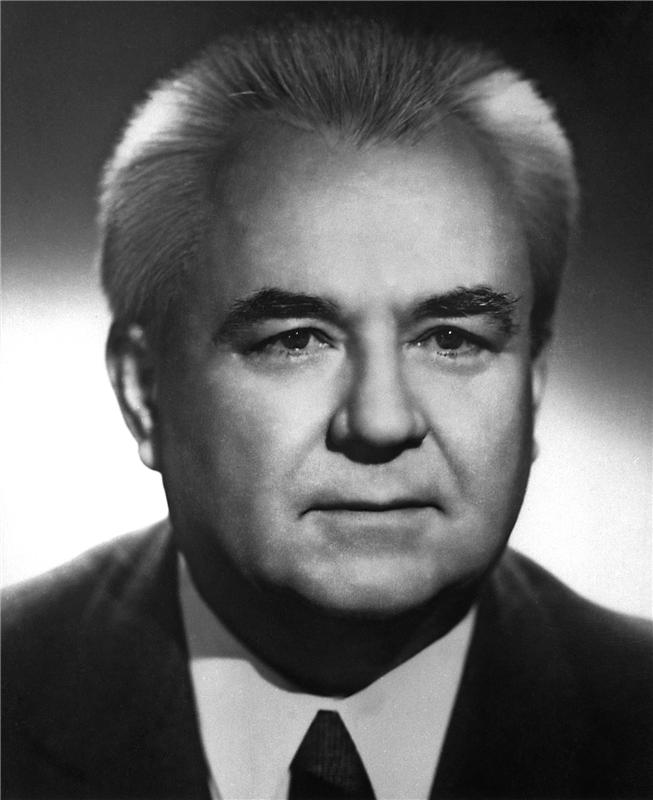
Jiří Pauer

Jiří Pauer czech pronunciation (22 February 1919 in Libušín, Czechoslovakia – 28 December 2007 in Prague, Czech Republic) was a Czech composer.

Pauer studied first with Otakar Šín, then from 1943 to 1946 at the Prague Conservatory with Alois Hába, and finally with Pavel Bořkovec at the Academy of Performing Arts in Prague. He later taught for many years at the Academy where his pupils included composer Jiří Gemrot. He has composed many pieces, many of which focus on the brass orchestral instruments, symphonies, and further orchestra pieces, a bassoon concerto, a horn concerto and a trumpet concerto, chamber music pieces, and piano pieces. His opera Zdravý nemocný, based on Molière's Le Malade imaginaire, premiered at the Prague National Theatre on 22 May 1970.

In 1989 Jiří Pauer was dismissed from his post as general director of the National Theatre in Prague, because of his support for the policies of the former Communist Czechoslovak government. Pauer had locked staff out of the National and Smetana theatres on 17 November 1989 to prevent the opera, ballet and drama companies from staging protest performances. After a three-week strike Pauer was replaced by Ivo Žídek.

== Selected works ==
- Zuzana Vojířová opera, 1958
- Concerto for Bassoon and Orchestra, 1949
- Concerto for Horn and Orchestra, 1957
- Wind Quintet, 1961
- 12 Duets for Viola and Cello, 1969–1970
- Concert Music, 1971
- Concerto for Trumpet and Orchestra, 1972
- Trompetina for Trumpet and Piano, 1972
- Trombonetta for Trombone and Piano, 1974–1975
- Intrada for 3 Pianos, 3 Trumpets, and 3 Trombones, 1975
- Tubonetta for Tuba and Piano, 1976
- Hymn for communist party, 1977
- Characters for Brass Quintet, 1977–1978
- 12 Duets for 2 Trompets (or Horns), 1983
- Trio for 3 Horns, 1986
