= Zdeněk Folprecht (composer) =

Czech conductor and composer

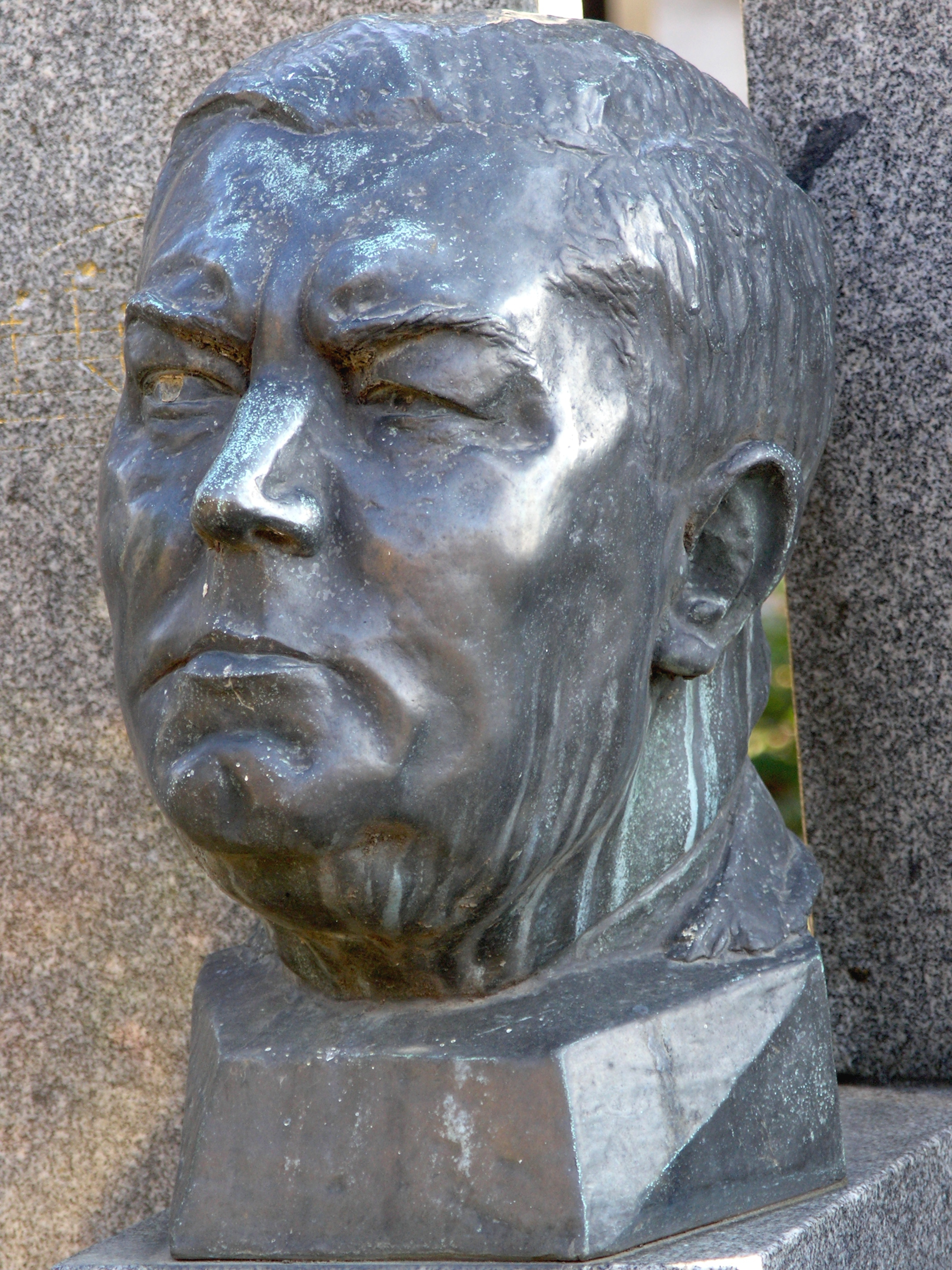
Bust in the Vyšehrad cemetery

Zdeněk Folprecht (Turnov 26 January 1900 - 29 October 1961 Prague) was a Czech composer and conductor.
