= Karel Čapek =

Czech science fiction writer and playwright (1890–1938)

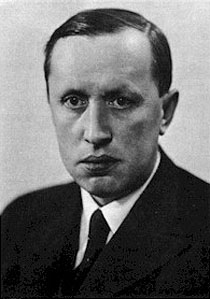
- Born: 9 January 1890; Malé Svatoňovice, Austria-Hungary
- Died: 25 December 1938 (aged 48); Prague, Czechoslovakia
- Resting place: Vyšehrad Cemetery, Prague
- Education: Charles University in Prague (PhD, 1915)
- Occupations: Writer; critic; journalist
- Employer: Lidové noviny (newspaper)
- Spouse: Olga Scheinpflugová
- Parent(s): Antonín Čapek (father); Božena Čapková (mother)
- Relatives: Josef Čapek (brother); Helena Čapková (sister)
- Writing career
- Pen name: K. Č., B. Č.
- Language: Czech
- Genres: Science fiction and political satire (novel; short story; play); fairy tale; sketch; feuilleton; travelogue; translation; opinion journalism; essay; literary and art criticism; libretto
- Subjects: Totalitarianism; militarism; industrial inventions
- Notable works: R.U.R. Válka s mloky (War with the Newts); Bílá nemoc (The White Disease); Továrna na absolutno (The Absolute at Large); Krakatit
- Notable awards: Order of Tomáš Garrigue Masaryk (in memoriam)
- Movement: Modernism

Karel Čapek (/ˈtʃɑːpɛk/; Czech: [ˈkarɛl ˈtʃapɛk]; 9 January 1890 – 25 December 1938) was a Czech writer, playwright, critic and journalist. He has become best known for his science fiction, including his novel War with the Newts (1936) and play R.U.R. (Rossum's Universal Robots, 1920), which introduced the word robot. He also wrote many politically charged works dealing with the social turmoil of his time. Influenced by American pragmatic liberalism, he campaigned in favor of free expression and strongly opposed the rise of both fascism and communism in Europe.

Though nominated for the Nobel Prize in Literature seven times, Čapek never received it. However, several awards commemorate his name, such as the Karel Čapek Prize, awarded every other year by the Czech PEN Club for literary work that contributes to reinforcing or maintaining democratic and humanist values in society. He also played a key role in establishing the Czechoslovak PEN Club as part of International PEN.

Čapek died on the brink of World War II as the result of a lifelong medical condition. His legacy as a literary figure became well established after the war.

== Life ==
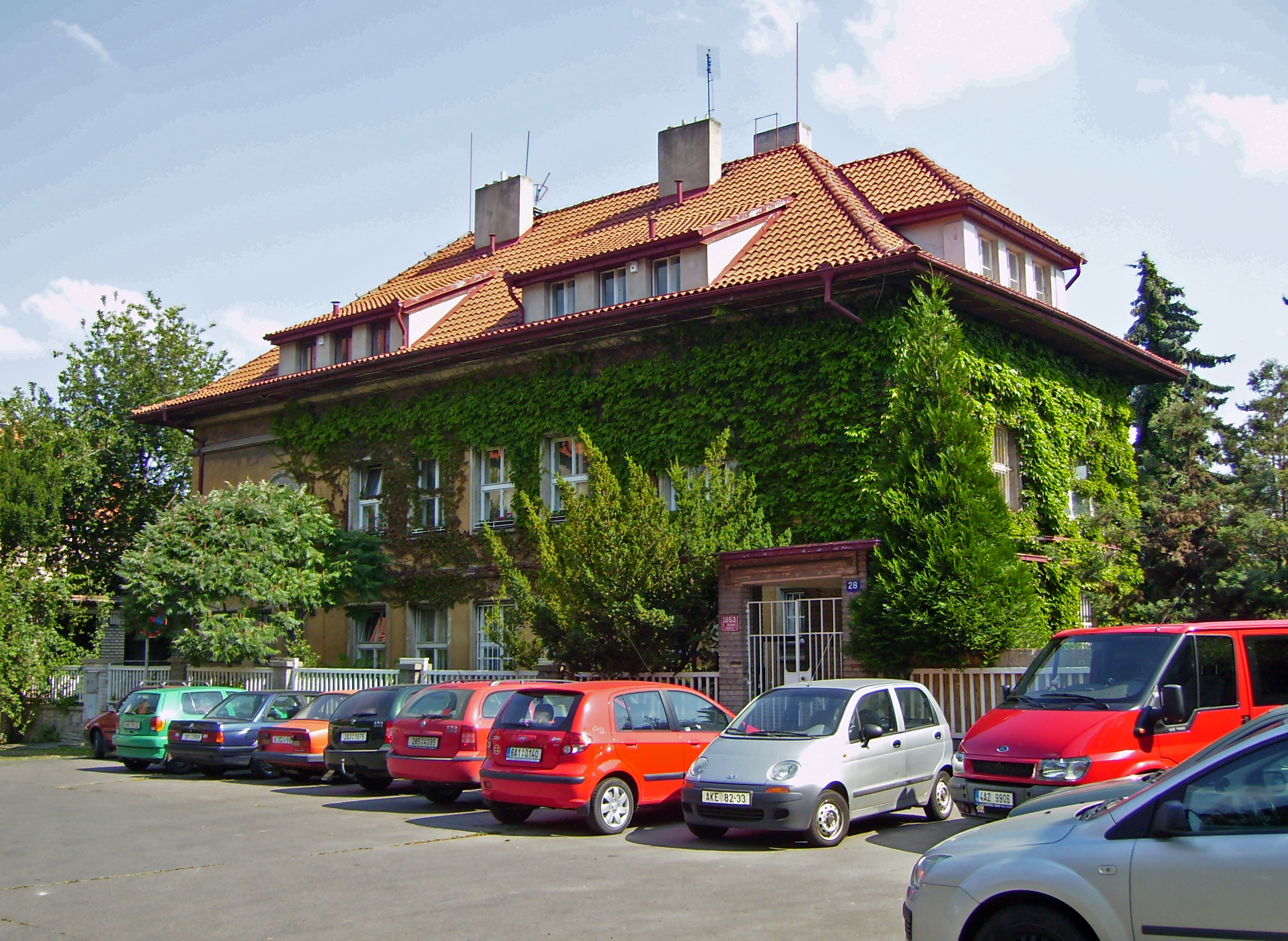
House of the Brothers Čapek in Prague 10, Vinohrady

=== Early life and education ===
Karel Čapek was born in 1890 in the village of Malé Svatoňovice in the Bohemian mountains. However, six months after his birth, the Čapek family moved to their own house in Úpice. Karel Čapek's father, Antonín Čapek, worked as a doctor at the local textile factory. Antonín was a very active person; apart from his work as a doctor, he also co-funded the local museum and was a member of the town council.

Despite opposing his father's materialist and positivist views, Karel Čapek loved and admired his father, later calling him "a good example ... of the generation of national awakeners". Karel's mother, Božena Čapková, was a homemaker. Unlike her husband, she did not like life in the country, and she suffered from long-term depression. Despite that, she assiduously collected and recorded local folklore, such as legends, songs and stories. Karel was the youngest of three siblings. He would maintain an especially close relationship with his brother Josef, a highly successful painter, living and working with him throughout his adult life. His sister, Helena, was a talented pianist who later become a writer and published several memoirs about Karel and Josef.

After finishing elementary school in Úpice, Karel moved with his grandmother to Hradec Králové, where he started attending high school. Two years later the school expelled him for taking part in an illegal students' club. Čapek later described the club as a "very non-murderous anarchist society".

After this incident he moved to Brno with his sister and attempted to finish high school there, but two years later he moved again, to Prague, where he finished high school at the Academic Grammar School in 1909. During his teenage years Čapek became enamored with the visual arts, especially Cubism, which influenced his later writing.

After graduating from high school, he studied philosophy and aesthetics in Prague at Charles University, but he also spent some time at the Friedrich Wilhelm University in Berlin and at the University of Paris. While still a university student he wrote some works on contemporary art and literature. He graduated with a doctorate in philosophy in 1915 from Charles University.

=== World War I and the interwar period ===
Exempted from military service due to the spinal problems that would haunt him his whole life, Čapek observed World War I from Prague. His political views were strongly affected by the war, and as a budding journalist he began to write on topics like nationalism, totalitarianism and consumerism. Through social circles, the young author developed close relationships with many of the political leaders of the nascent Czechoslovak state, including Tomáš Garrigue Masaryk, Czechoslovak patriot and the first President of Czechoslovakia, and his son Jan Masaryk, who would later become minister of foreign affairs. T. G. Masaryk was a regular guest at Čapek's "Friday Men" garden parties for leading Czech intellectuals. Čapek was also a member of Masaryk's Hrad political network. Their frequent conversations on various topics later served as the basis for Čapek's book Talks with T. G. Masaryk.

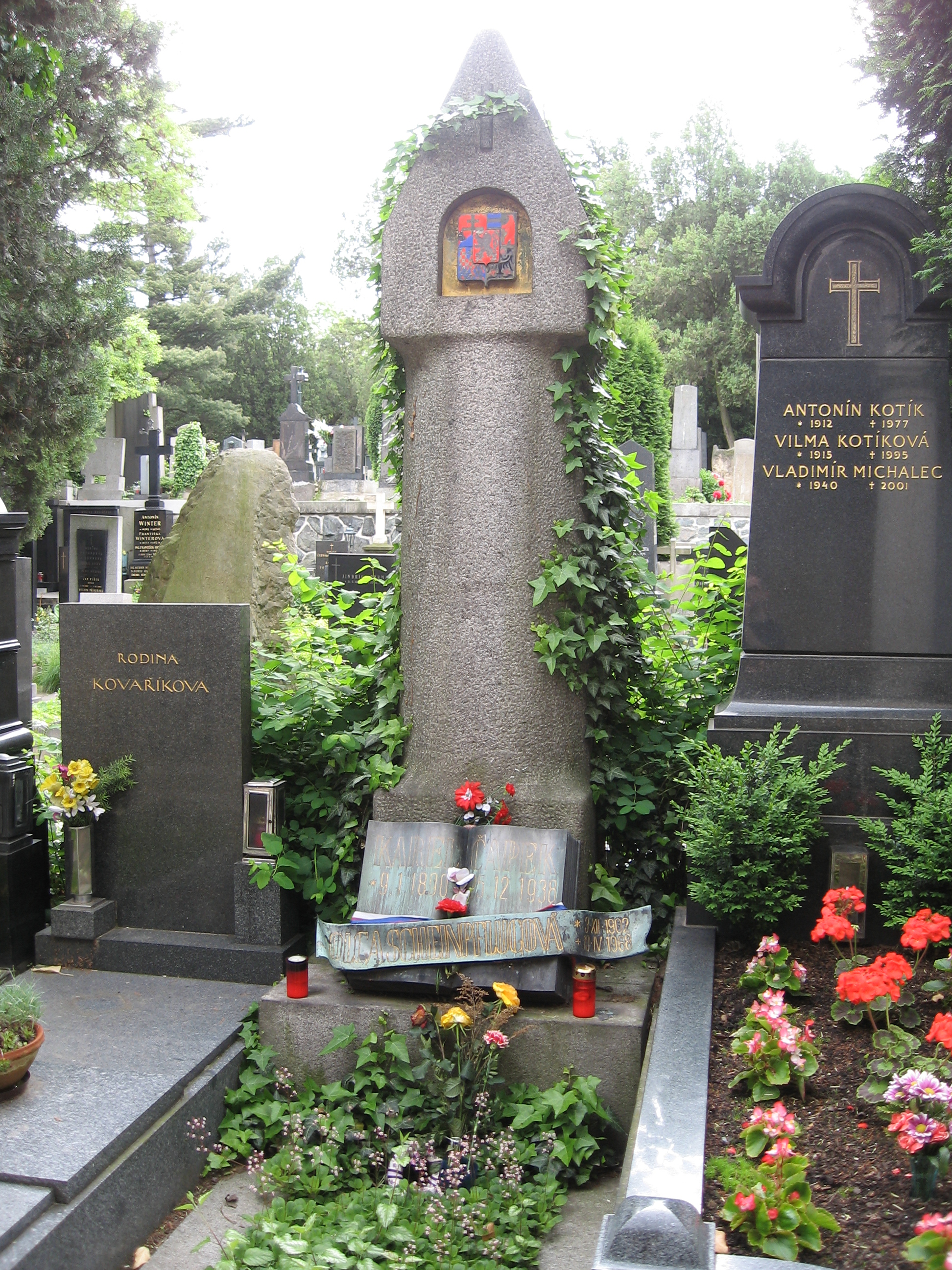
Tomb of Karel Čapek and Olga Scheinpflugová at Vyšehrad cemetery

Čapek began his writing career as a journalist. With his brother Josef, he worked as an editor for the Czech paper Národní listy (The National Newspaper) from October 1917 to April 1921. Upon leaving, he and Josef joined the staff of Lidové noviny (The People's Paper) in April 1921.

Čapek's early attempts at fiction were short stories and plays for the most part written with his brother Josef. His first international success was R.U.R., a dystopian work about a bad day at a factory populated with sentient androids. The play was translated into English in 1922, and was being performed in the UK and America by 1923. Throughout the 1920s, Čapek worked in many writing genres, producing both fiction and non-fiction, but worked primarily as a journalist.

In the 1930s, Čapek's work focused on the threat of brutal national socialist and fascist dictatorships; by the mid-1930s, Čapek had become "an outspoken anti-fascist". He also became a member of International PEN Club. He established, and was the first president of the Czechoslovak PEN Club.

=== Late life and death ===
The only known recording of Čapek's voice, Peace message to Rabindranath Tagore, Christmas Eve 1937

In 1935, he married actress Olga Scheinpflugová, after a long acquaintance. In 1938, it became clear that the Western allies, namely France and the United Kingdom, would fail to fulfil the pre-war treaty agreements, and they refused to defend Czechoslovakia against Nazi Germany. Although offered the chance to go to exile in England, Čapek refused to leave his country – even though the Nazi Gestapo had named him "public enemy number two". While repairing flood damage to his family's summer house in Stará Huť, he contracted a common cold. As he had suffered all his life from spondyloarthritis and was also a heavy smoker, his cold soon developed into pneumonia, which he died from on 25 December 1938.

Surprisingly, the Gestapo was not aware of his death. Several months later, just after the German invasion of Czechoslovakia, Nazi agents came to the Čapek family house in Prague to arrest him. Upon discovering that he had already been dead for some time, they arrested and interrogated his wife Olga. She was later released and lived until 1968; she died onstage of a heart attack while performing one of her husband's plays. His brother Josef was arrested in September and eventually died in the Bergen-Belsen concentration camp in April 1945. Karel Čapek and his wife are buried at the Vyšehrad Cemetery in Prague. The inscription on the tombstone reads: "Here Josef Čapek, painter and poet, would have been buried. Grave far away."

== Writing ==
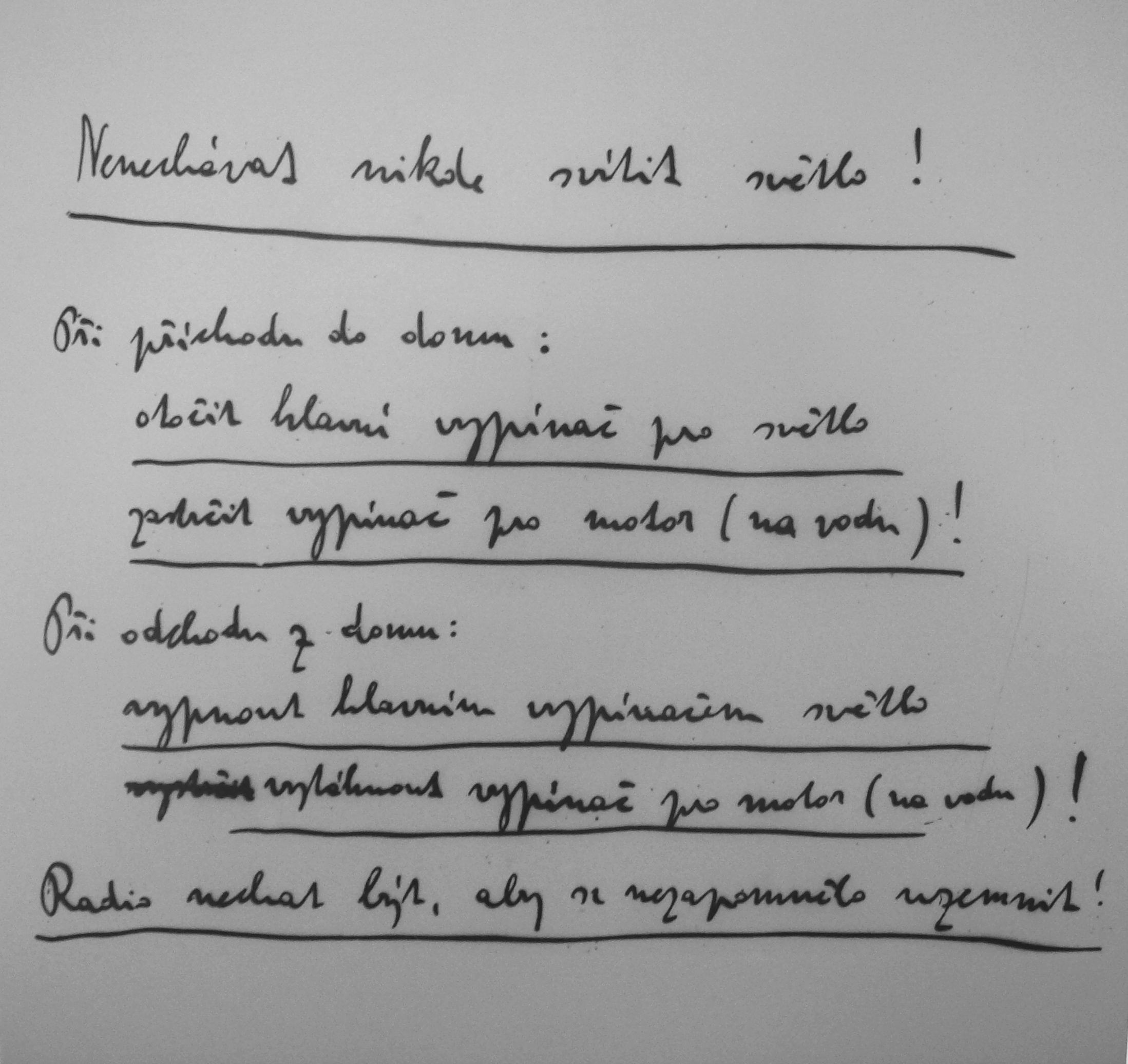
Karel Čapek's handwriting

Karel Čapek wrote on a wide variety of subjects. His works are known for their precise description of reality. Čapek is renowned for his work with the Czech language.

He is known as a science-fiction author who wrote before science fiction became widely recognized as a separate genre. Many of his works also discuss ethical aspects of industrial inventions and processes already anticipated in the first half of the 20th century. These include mass production, nuclear weapons and intelligent artificial beings such as robots or androids. His most productive years were during the First Republic of Czechoslovakia (1918–1938).

Čapek also expressed fear of social disasters, dictatorship, violence, human stupidity, the unlimited power of corporations, and greed. He tried to find hope, and a way out. From the 1930s onward his work became increasingly anti-fascist, anti-militarist, and critical of what he saw as "irrationalism".

Ivan Klíma, in his biography of Čapek, notes his influence on modern Czech literature, as well as on the development of Czech as a written language. Čapek, along with contemporaries like Jaroslav Hašek (1883-1923), spawned part of the early 20th-century revival in written Czech thanks to their decision to use the vernacular. Klíma writes, "It is thanks to Čapek that the written Czech language grew closer to the language people actually spoke". Čapek was also a translator, and his translations from French poetry inspired a new generation of Czech poets.

His books and plays include detective-stories, novels, fairy tales and theatre plays, and even a book on gardening.

His most important works attempt to resolve problems of epistemology, to answer the question: "What is knowledge?" Examples include Tales from Two Pockets, and the first book of the trilogy of novels Hordubal, Meteor, and An Ordinary Life. He also co-wrote (with his brother Josef) the libretto for Zdeněk Folprecht's opera Lásky hra osudná in 1922.

After World War II, Čapek's work was only reluctantly accepted by the communist government of Czechoslovakia (in office 1948–1989), because during his life he had refused to accept communism as a viable alternative. He was the first in a series of influential non-Marxist intellectuals who wrote a newspaper essay in a series called "Why I am not a Communist".

In 2009 (70 years after his death), a book was published containing extensive correspondence by Karel Čapek, in which the writer discusses pacifism and his conscientious objection to military service with lawyer Jindřich Groag from Brno. Until then, only a portion of these letters were known.

Arthur Miller wrote in 1990:

I read Karel Čapek for the first time when I was a college student long ago in the Thirties. There was no writer like him ... prophetic assurance mixed with surrealistic humour and hard-edged social satire: a unique combination...he is a joy to read.

== Etymology of robot ==
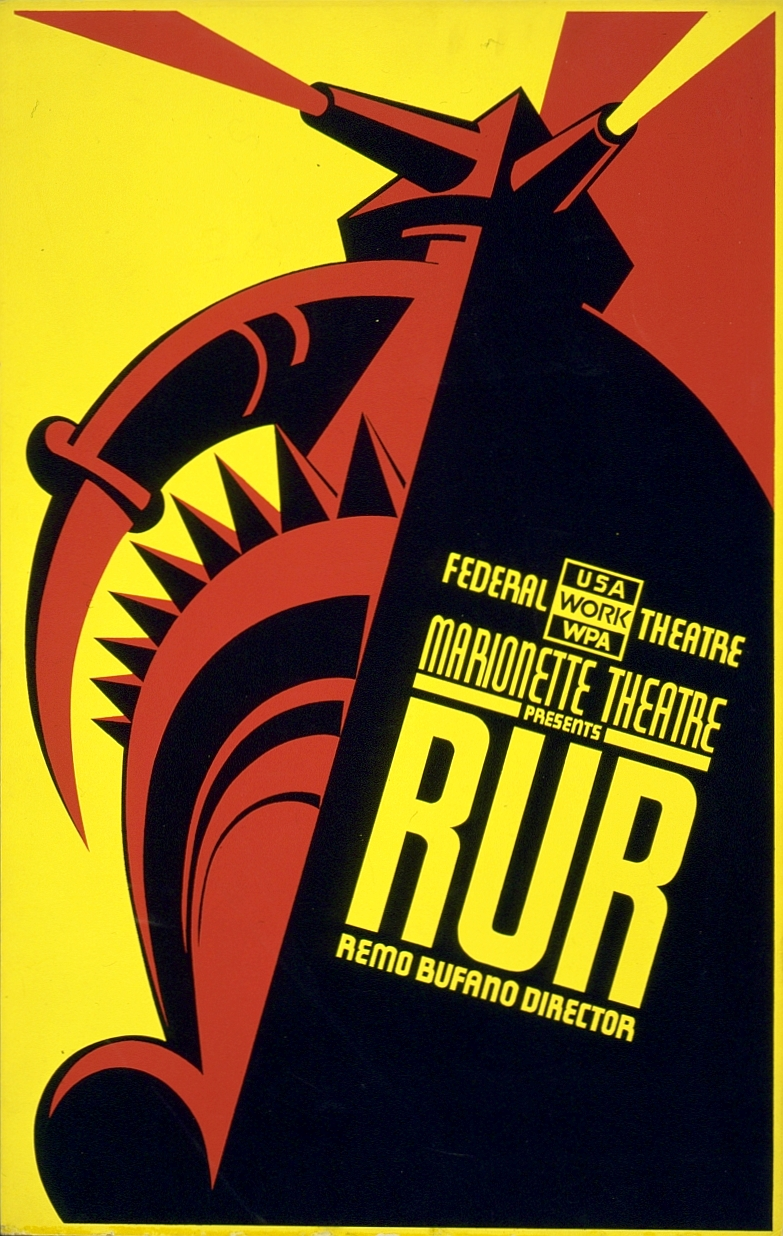
R.U.R. theatrical poster, 1939

Karel Čapek introduced and made popular the frequently used international word robot, which first appeared in his play R.U.R. in 1920. While it is frequently thought that he was the originator of the word, he wrote a short letter in reference to an article in the Oxford English Dictionary etymology in which he named his brother, painter and writer Josef Čapek, as its actual inventor.

In an article in the Czech journal Lidové noviny in 1933, he also explained that he had originally wanted to call the creatures laboři (from Latin labor, work). However, he did not like the word, seeing it as too artificial, and sought advice from his brother Josef, who suggested roboti (robots in English).

The word robot comes from the word robota. The word robota means literally "corvée", "serf labor", and figuratively "drudgery" or "hard work" in Czech. It also means "work", "labor" in colloquial Slovak, archaic Czech, and many other Slavic languages (e.g., Bulgarian, Russian, Serbian, Polish, Macedonian, Ukrainian, etc.). It derives from the reconstructed Proto-Slavic word *orbota, meaning "work, hard work, obligatory work for the king, or a short form used for plowing".

== Awards and honours ==
The asteroid 1931 Čapek, discovered by Luboš Kohoutek was named after him.

Čapek received the Order of Tomáš Garrigue Masaryk, in memoriam, in 1991.

Richard E. Pattis named the Karel computer programming language for Čapek.

== Selected works ==
=== Plays ===
- 1920 – The Outlaw (Loupežník)
- 1920 – R.U.R. (Rossum's Universal Robots), (Rossumovi univerzální roboti) – play with one of the first examples of artificial intelligence human-like beings in art and literature.
- 1921 – Pictures from the Insects' Life (Ze života hmyzu), also known as The Insect Play or The Life of the Insects, with Josef Čapek, a satire in which insects stand in for various human characteristics: the flighty, vain butterfly, the obsequious, self-serving dung beetle.
- 1922 – The Makropulos Affair (Věc Makropulos) – play about human immortality, not really from a science-fiction point of view. Leoš Janáček's opera is based on that.
- 1927 – Adam the Creator (Adam stvořitel), with Josef Čapek – The titular hero tries to destroy the world and replace it with a better one. It was adapted into an animated short by Japanese director Mahiro Maeda in 2015.
- 1937 – The White Disease (Bílá nemoc) – earlier translated as (Power and Glory). About the conflict between a pacifist doctor and the fascistic Marshal. This was the answer to coming Nazi era in the air, just before the start of WWII.
- 1938 – The Mother (Matka)

=== Novels ===
- 1922 – The Absolute at Large (Továrna na absolutno) – novel which can be interpreted as a vision of consumer society.
- 1922 – Krakatit – novel, the plot of which includes a prediction of a nuclear-weapon-like explosive.
- 1933 – Hordubal – First part of the "Noetic Trilogy".
- 1934 – Meteor (Povětroň) – Second part of the "Noetic Trilogy".
- 1934 – An Ordinary Life (Obyčejný život) – Third part of the "Noetic Trilogy".
- 1936 – War with the Newts (Válka s mloky) – satirical dystopian novel.
- 1937 – The First Rescue Party (První parta) – novel based on the experiences of members of a rescue squad at the site of a mining accident. Became the basis for a film in 1959.
- 1939 – Life and Work of the Composer Foltýn (Život a dílo skladatele Foltýna) – unfinished, published posthumously

=== Travel books ===
Examples of sketches by Karel Čapek for the book Letters from England (1925 edition)
- Letters from Italy (Italské listy, 1923)
- Letters from England (Anglické listy, 1924)
- Letters from Spain (Výlet do Španěl, 1930)
- Letters from Holland (Obrázky z Holandska, 1932)
- Travels in the North (Cesta na Sever, 1936)

=== Other works ===
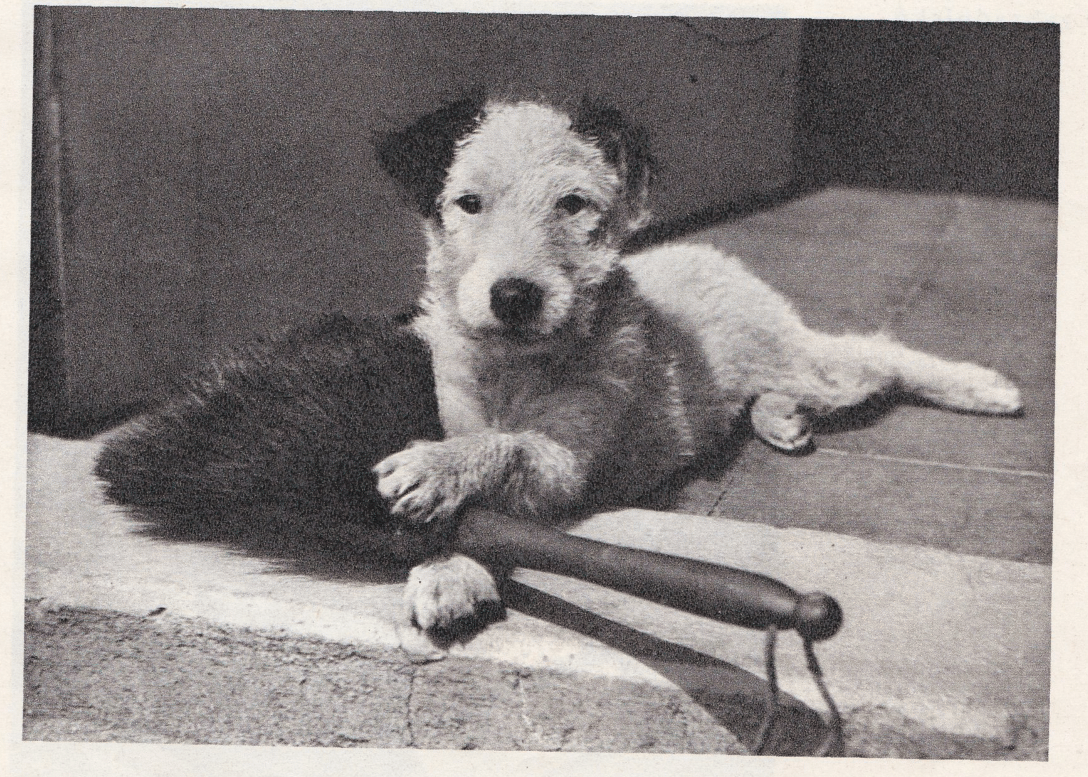
A photograph taken by Karel Čapek for the book Dashenka, or the Life of a Puppy

- Stories from a Pocket and Stories from Another Pocket, (Povídky z jedné a z druhé kapsy) – a common name for a cycle of short detective stories (5–10 pages long) that shared common attitude and characters, including The Last Judgement.
- How it is Made (Jak se co dělá) – satiric novels on the life of theater, newspaper and movie studio.
- The Gardener's Year (Zahradníkův rok, 1929) is exactly what it says it is: a year-round guide to gardening, charmingly written, with illustrations by his brother Josef Čapek.
- Apocryphal Tales (Kniha apokryfů, 1932, 2nd edition 1945) – short stories about literary and historical characters, such as Hamlet, a struggling playwright, Pontius Pilate, Don Juan, Alexander arguing with his teacher Aristotle, and Sarah and Abraham attempting to name ten good people so Sodom can be saved.'
  - The Punishment of Prometheus (1932)
  - Times Aren't What They Were (1931)
  - As in the Good Old Days (1926)
  - Thersites (1931)
  - Agathon, or Concerning Wisdom (1920)
  - Alexander the Great (1937)
  - The Death of Archimedes (1938)
  - The Roman Legions (1928)
  - The Ten Righteous (1931)
  - Pseudo Lot, or Concerning Patriotism (1923)
  - Christmas Eve (1930)
  - Martha and Mary (1932)
  - Lazarus (1932)
  - The Fives Loaves (1937)
  - Benchanan (1934)
  - The Crucifixion (1927)
  - Pilate's Evening (1934)
  - Pilate's Creed (1920)
  - The Emperor Diocletian (1932)
  - Attila (1932)
  - The Idol Breakers (1936)
  - Brother Francis (1932)
  - Ophir (1932)
  - Goneril (1933)
  - Hamlet, Prince of Denmark (1934)
  - Don Juan's Confession (1932)
  - Romeo and Juliet (1932)
  - Master Hynek Rab of Kufstejn (1933)
  - Napoleon (1933)
- Nine Fairy Tales: And One More Thrown in for Good Measure (Devatero Pohádek a ještě jedna od Josefa Čapka jako přívažek, 1932) – a collection of fairy tales, aimed at children.
- Dashenka, or the Life of a Puppy (Dášeňka čili Život štěněte, 1933)
- The Shirts (short story)

== Selected bibliography ==
- The Absolute at Large, 1922 (in Czech), 1927, The Macmillan Company, New York, translator uncredited. Also published 1975, Garland Publishing ISBN 0824014030,
- Apocryphal Tales, 1945 (in Czech), 1997, Catbird Press Paperback ISBN 0945774346, Translated by Norma Comrada
- An Atomic Phantasy: Krakatit or simply Krakatit, 1924 (in Czech)
- Believe in People : the essential Karel Čapek : previously untranslated journalism and letters 2010. Faber and Faber, ISBN 978-0571231621. Selected and translated with an introduction by Šárka Tobrmanová-Kühnová; preface by John Carey.
- The Cheat. Allen and Unwin, 1941.
- Cross Roads, 2002, Catbird Press, ISBN 0945774559 cloth; ISBN 0945774540 trade paperback. Translation by Norma Comrada of "Boží muka" (1917) and "Trapné povídky" (1921).
- I Had a Dog and a Cat. Allen & Unwin, 1940.
- Nine Fairy Tales: And One More Thrown in for Good Measure, 1996, Northwestern Univ Press Paperback Reissue Edition, ISBN 081011464X. Illustrated by Josef Capek, Translated by Dagmar Herrmann
- R.U.R., 1970, Pocket Books ISBN 0671466054
- Tales from Two Pockets 1928–29 (in Czech), 1994, Catbird Press Paperback, ISBN 0945774257. Translation by Norma Comrada.
- Talks With T. G. Masaryk (non-fiction). Biography of T. G. Masaryk, founder of Czechoslovakia.
- Three Novels: Hordubal, Meteor, An Ordinary Life, 1933–34, Translated by M. and R. Weatherall, 1990, Catbird Press
- Toward the Radical Center: A Karel Capek Reader. Collection of stories, plays and columns. Edited by Peter Kussi, Catbird Press ISBN 0945774079
- War with the Newts 1936 (in Czech), 1967, Berkley Medallion Edition Paperback. Translated by M. & R. Weatherall, March 1990, Catbird Press paperback, ISBN 0945774109, October 1996, Northwestern University Press paperback ISBN 0810114682. Another English translation by Ewald Osers ISBN 978-0945774105

== See also ==
- Brothers Čapek
- Czech speculative fiction
