= R.U.R. =

1920 play by Karel Čapek

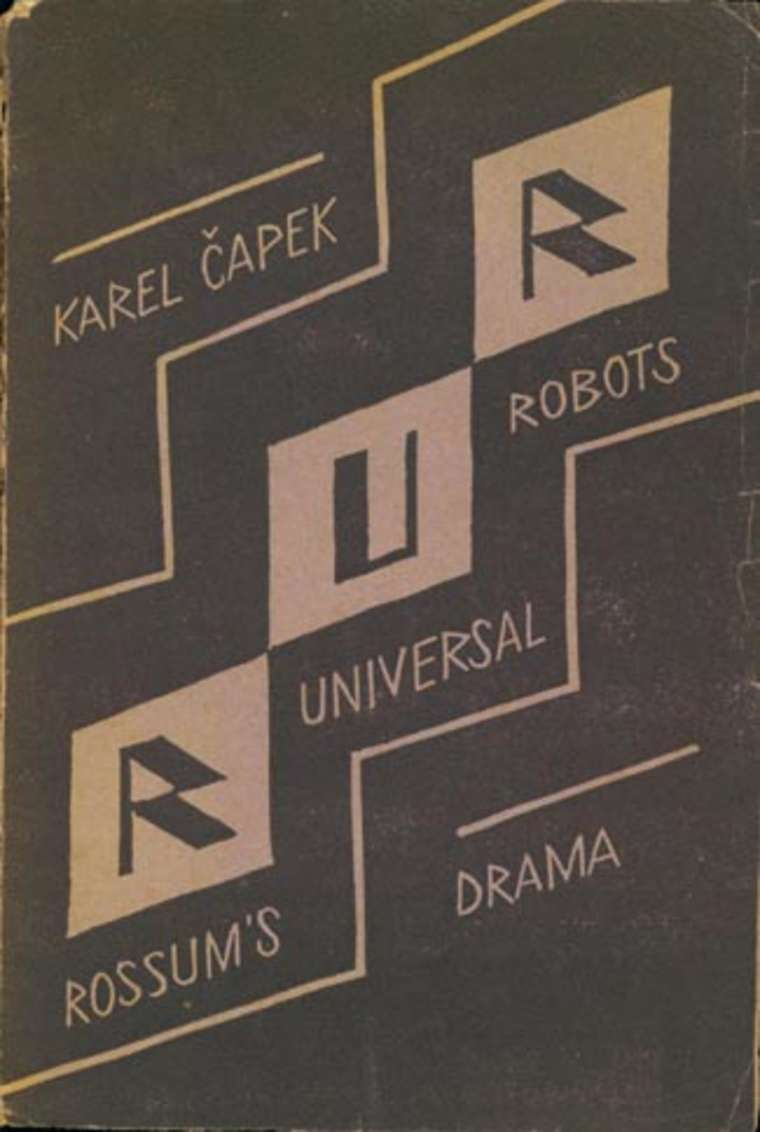
- Cover of the first edition of the play designed by Josef Čapek, Aventinum, Prague, 1920
- Original language: Czech
- Written by: Karel Čapek
- Genre: Science fiction

Premiere
- Date: 2 January 1921

R.U.R. is a 1920 science fiction play by the Czech writer Karel Čapek. "R.U.R." stands for Rossumovi Univerzální Roboti (Rossum's Universal Robots, a phrase that has been used as a subtitle in English versions).

The play had its world premiere on 2 January 1921 in Hradec Králové. It introduced the word "robot" to the English language and to science fiction as a whole. R.U.R. became influential soon after its publication.

By 1923, it had been translated into thirty languages. R.U.R. was successful in its time in Europe and North America. Čapek later took a different approach to the same theme in his 1936 novel War with the Newts, in which non-humans become a servant-class in human society.

== Characters ==
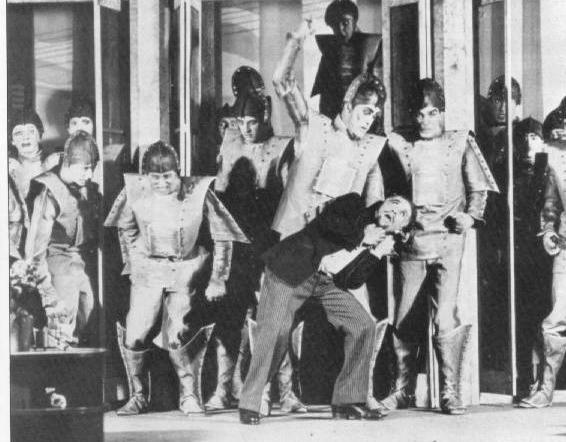
The robots breaking into the factory at the end of Act II

Parentheses indicate names which vary according to translation. On the meaning of the names, see Ivan Klíma: Karel Čapek: Life and Work (2002).

Humans
- Harry Domin (Domain), general manager, R.U.R.
- Fabry, chief engineer, R.U.R.
- Dr. Gall, head of the Physiological Department, R.U.R.
- Dr. Hallemeier (Hellman), psychologist-in-chief
- Busman (Jacob Berman), managing director, R.U.R.
- Alquist, clerk of works, R.U.R.
- Helena Glory, president of the Humanity League, daughter of President Glory
- Nana (Emma), Helena's maid
Robots and robotesses
- Sulla, a robotess
- Marius, a robot
- Radius, a robot
- Damon (Daemon), a robot
- Helena, a robotess
- Primus, a robot

== Plot ==
=== Synopsis ===
The play begins in a factory that makes artificial workers from synthetic organic matter. (As living creatures of artificial flesh and blood, that later terminology would call androids, the playwright's 'roboti' differ from later fictional and scientific concepts of inorganic constructs.) Robots may be mistaken for humans but have no original thoughts. Though most are content to work for humans, eventually a rebellion causes the extinction of the human race.

=== Prologue (Act I in the Selver translation) ===
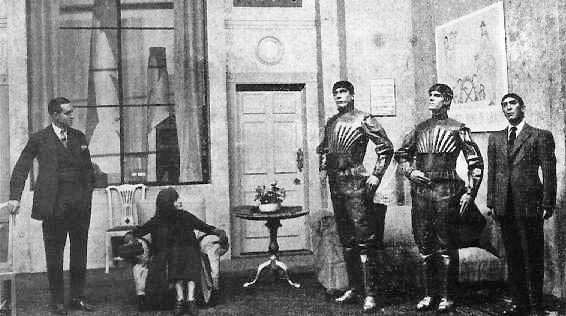
A scene from the play, showing three robots

Helena, the daughter of the president of a major industrial power, arrives at the island factory of Rossum's Universal Robots. Here, she meets Domin, the General Manager of R.U.R., who relates to her the history of the company. Rossum had come to the island in 1920 to study marine biology. In 1932, Rossum had invented a substance like organic matter, though with a different chemical composition. He argued with his nephew about their motivations for creating artificial life. While the elder wanted to create animals to prove or disprove the existence of God, his nephew only wanted to become rich. Young Rossum finally locked away his uncle in a lab to play with the monstrosities the latter had invented whilst the former instead created thousands of new robots. By the time the play takes place (circa the year 2000), robots are cheap and available all over the world. They have become essential for industry.

After meeting the heads of R.U.R., Helena reveals that she is a representative of the League of Humanity, an organization that wishes to liberate the robots. The managers of the factory find this absurd. They see robots as appliances. Helena asks that the robots be paid, but according to R.U.R. management, the robots do not "like" anything.

Eventually Helena is convinced that the League of Humanity is a waste of money, but still argues robots have a "soul". Later, Domin confesses that he loves Helena and forces her into an engagement.

=== Act I (Act II in Selver) ===
Ten years have passed. Helena and her nurse Nana discuss current events, the decline in human births in particular. Helena and Domin reminisce about the day they met and summarize the last ten years of world history, which has been shaped by the new worldwide robot-based economy. Helena meets Dr. Gall's new experiment, Radius. Dr. Gall describes his experimental robotess, also named Helena. Both are more advanced, fully-featured robots. In secret, Helena burns the formula required to create robots. The revolt of the robots reaches Rossum's island as the act ends.

=== Act II (Act III in Selver) ===
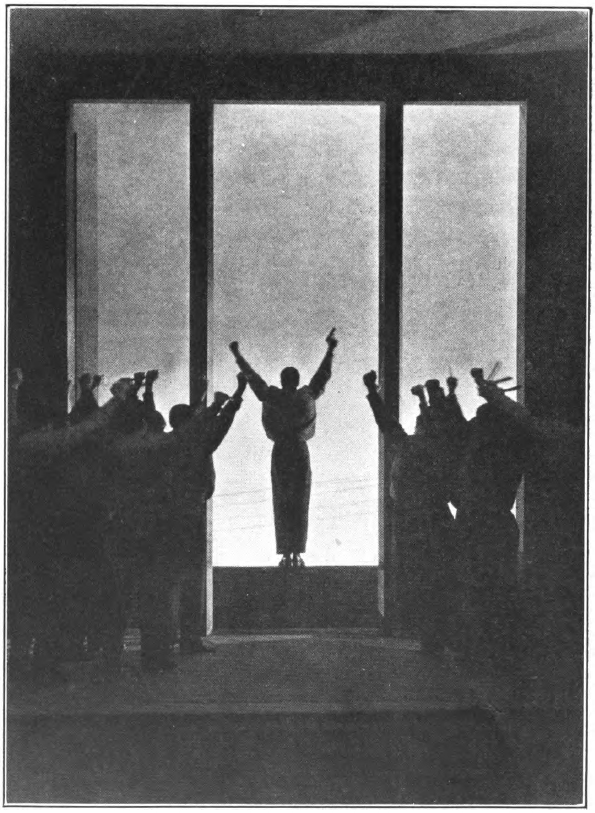
Final scene of Act II

The characters sense that the very universality of the robots presents a danger. Echoing the story of the Tower of Babel, the characters discuss whether creating national robots who were unable to communicate beyond their languages would have been a good idea. As robot forces lay siege to the factory, Helena reveals she has burned the formula necessary to make new robots. The characters lament the end of humanity and defend their actions, despite the fact that their imminent deaths are a direct result of their choices. Busman is killed while attempting to negotiate a peace with the robots. The robots storm the factory and kill all the humans except for Alquist, the company's Clerk of the Works (Head of Construction). The robots spare him because they recognize that "He works with his hands like a robot. He builds houses. He can work."

=== Act III (Epilogue in Selver) ===
Years have passed. Alquist, who still lives, attempts to recreate the formula that Helena destroyed. He is a mechanical engineer, though, with insufficient knowledge of biochemistry, so he has made little progress. The robot government has searched for surviving humans to help Alquist and found none alive. Officials from the robot government beg him to complete the formula, even if it means he will have to kill and dissect other robots for it. Alquist yields. He will kill and dissect robots, thus completing the circle of violence begun in Act Two. Alquist is disgusted. Robot Primus and Helena develop human feelings and fall in love. Playing a hunch, Alquist threatens to dissect Primus and then Helena; each begs him to take him- or herself and spare the other. Alquist now realizes that Primus and Helena are the new Adam and Eve, and gives the charge of the world to them.

== Čapek's conception of robots ==
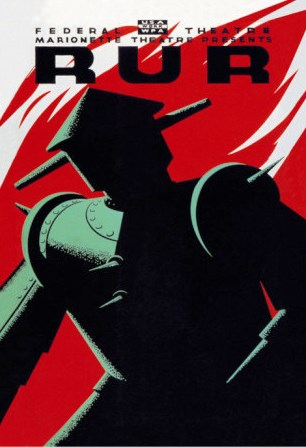
U.S. WPA Federal Theatre Project poster for the production by the Marionette Theatre, New York, 1939

The robots described in Čapek's play are not robots in the popularly understood sense of an automaton. They are not mechanical devices, but rather artificial biological organisms that may be mistaken for humans. A comic scene at the beginning of the play shows Helena arguing with her future husband, Harry Domin, because she cannot believe his secretary is a robotess:

DOMIN: Sulla, let Miss Glory have a look at you.
HELENA: (stands and offers her hand) Pleased to meet you. It must be very hard for you out here, cut off from the rest of the world.
SULLA: I do not know the rest of the world Miss Glory. Please sit down.
HELENA: (sits) Where are you from?
SULLA: From here, the factory.
HELENA: Oh, you were born here.
SULLA: Yes I was made here.
HELENA: (startled) What?
DOMIN: (laughing) Sulla isn't a person, Miss Glory, she's a robot.
HELENA: Oh, please forgive me...

His robots resemble more modern conceptions of man-made life forms, such as the Replicants in Blade Runner, the "hosts" in the Westworld TV series and the humanoid Cylons in the re-imagined Battlestar Galactica, but in Čapek's time there was no conception of modern genetic engineering (DNA's role in heredity was not confirmed until 1952). There are descriptions of kneading-troughs for robot skin, great vats for liver and brains, and a factory for producing bones. Nerve fibers, arteries, and intestines are spun on factory bobbins, while the robots themselves are assembled like automobiles. Čapek's robots are living biological beings, but they are still assembled, as opposed to grown or born.

One critic has described Čapek's robots as epitomizing "the traumatic transformation of modern society by the First World War and the Fordist assembly line".

=== Origin of the word robot ===
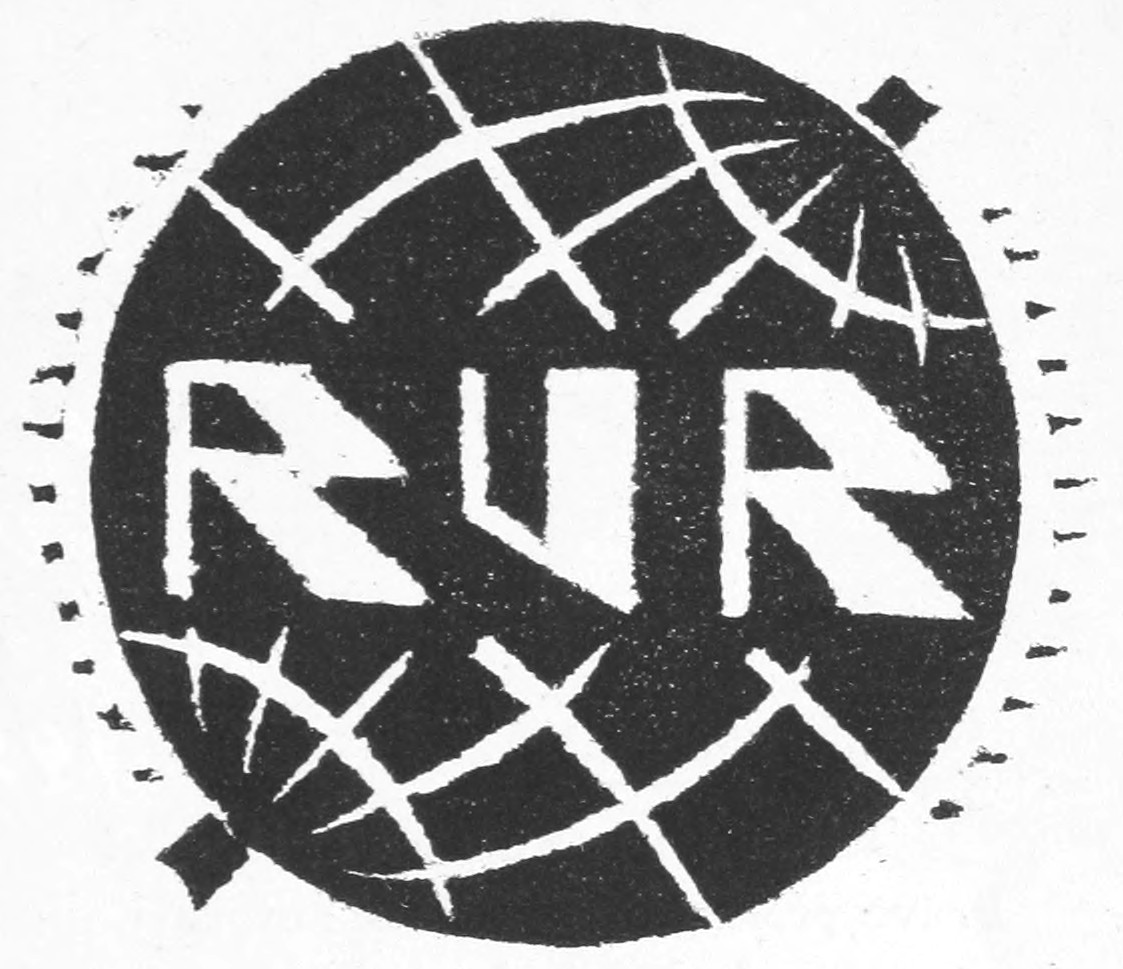
Logo of Rossum's Universal Robots corporation, from the first edition title page, 1920

The play introduced the word robot, which displaced older words such as "automaton" or "android" in languages around the world. In an article in Lidové noviny, Karel Čapek named his brother Josef as the true inventor of the word. In Czech, robota means forced labour of the kind that serfs had to perform on their masters' lands and is derived from rab, meaning "slave".

The name Rossum is an allusion to the Czech word rozum, meaning "reason", "wisdom", "intellect" or "common sense". It has been suggested that the allusion might be preserved by translating "Rossum" as "Reason" but only the Majer/Porter version translates the word as "Reason".

== Production history and translations ==
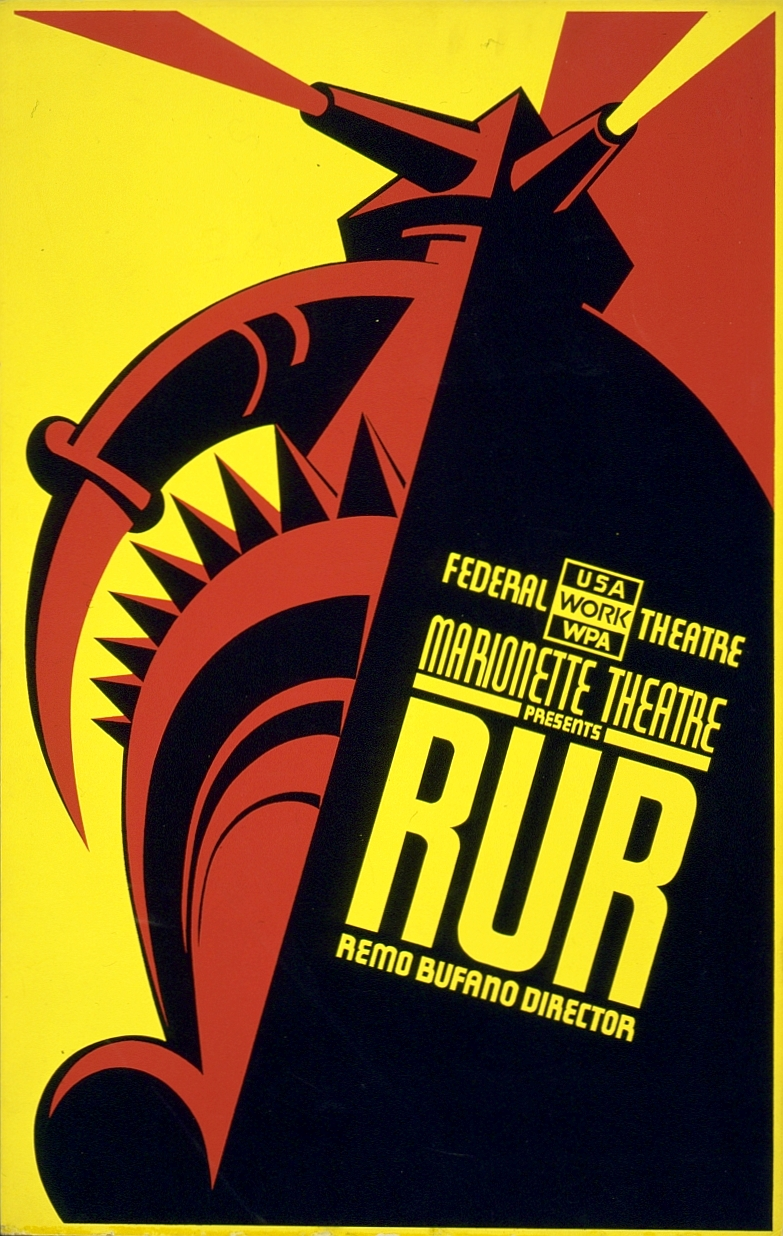
Poster for a Federal Theatre Project production of R.U.R. directed by Remo Bufano in New York, 1939

The work was published in two differing versions in Prague by Aventinum, first in 1920, followed by a revised version in 1921. After being postponed, it premiered at the city's National Theatre on 25 January 1921, although an amateur group had by then already presented a production. (Note: The world premiere was planned to be in the National Theater in Prague, but had to be postponed to 25 January 1921. The amateur theater group Klicpera in Hradec Králové, which was supposed to mount a production after the premiere, was not informed about the date change in the National Theater, so their opening night on 2 January 1921 was the actual world premiere.)

By 1921, Paul Selver translated either the original 1920 edition of R.U.R. or a manuscript copy close to this version into English. (Note: No copies of Selver's original translation are known to exist. An approximation of the original translation can be reconstructed from the Doubleday and Oxford University Press editions, as well as copies of the Theatre Guild prompt book and a version submitted to the Lord Chamberlain's Office by St Martin's Theatre, though all these versions are based on Playfair's adaptation, and most include at least some changes by the Theatre Guild.) He probably translated the play freelance, and sold it to St Martin's Theatre in London. Selver's translation was adapted for the British stage by Nigel Playfair in 1922, but it was not produced straight away. Later that year performance rights for the U.S. and Canada were sold to the New York Theatre Guild, perhaps during Lawrence Langner's visit to Britain. Playfair's version included several changes to Čapek's original play, such as renaming the acts (the prologue became act one, and the heavily abridged final act became the epilogue), omitting around sixty lines (including most of Alquist's final speech), adding several more lines, and removing the robot character Damon (giving his lines to Radius). The omission of some lines may have been censorship from the Lord Chamberlain's Office, or self-censorship in anticipation of this, while some other changes might have been made by Čapek himself if Selver was working from a manuscript copy. (Note: The possibility that Selver was working from a partially revised manuscript by Čapek is supported by textual evidence of the Doubleday and Oxford University Press editions, and also a copy of the final lines of the play in a letter from Čapek to Edward Marsh.) An edition of Playfair's adaptation was published by the Oxford University Press in 1923, and Selver went on to write a satiric novel One, Two, Three (1926) based on his experiences getting R.U.R. staged.

The American première was produced by the Theatre Guild at the Garrick Theatre in New York City in October 1922, where it ran for 184 performances. In the first performance, Domin was portrayed by Basil Sydney, Marius by John Merton, Hallemeier by Moffat Johnston, Alquist by Louis Calvert, Busman by Henry Travers, the robot Helena by antiwar activist Mary Crane Hone in her Broadway debut, and Primus by John Roche. Spencer Tracy and Pat O'Brien played robots in their Broadway debuts. This production was based on Playfair's adaptation, though Theresa Helburn claimed that, together with two Czechs, they closely compared his version against Čapek's original text, and that all changes from the original were made by the Theatre Guild as part of the rehearsal process. Doubleday published this version of the play in 1923, though it omitted a change noted by John Corbin in the New York Times, of the robot Helena holding a robot baby in the final scene.

In April 1923 Basil Dean produced R.U.R. in Britain for the Reandean Company at St Martin's Theatre, London. This version was based on Playfair's adaptation, but omitted the characters Fabry and Hallemeier, and included several of the New York Theatre Guild revisions. The British Library holds a typescript copy of this version of the play, which had been submitted by St Martin's Theatre to the Lord Chamberlain's Office two weeks before the play opened.

In the 1920s, the play was performed in a number of American and British cities, including the Theatre Guild "Road" in Chicago and Los Angeles during 1923.

In June 1923, Čapek sent a letter to Edward Marsh, with the final lines of R.U.R. that had been omitted from the Selver/Playfair editions, which he described as being "suppressed in [the] English version". (Note: The final lines written by Čapek in this letter miss out sentences that are in both published Czech editions. Mary Anne Fox suggested that this may have been as a result of Čapek recalling the lines from memory, while Robert M. Philmus wrote that it could have been taken from a partially revised draft that was sent to Selver, as the sentences missing are also missing from every edition of Selver's translation. One of the Lord Chamberlain's Office's objections to the play was that Alquist quoted the Bible in these final lines, which may account for their removal, as the suppression that Čapek referred to.) This letter is held in Southern Illinois University Carbondale's Morris Library, along with an English translation of these lines, perhaps in Marsh's handwriting. This translation was published in the journal Science Fiction Studies (2001). A full translation of the final lines of the 1921 version of the play was published in the journal ICarbS (1981).

In 1989, a new, unabridged translation by Claudia Novack-Jones, based on Čapek's revised 1921 version, restored the elements of the play eliminated by Playfair. Another unabridged translation was produced by Peter Majer and Cathy Porter for Methuen Drama in 1999. An open access unabridged translation by David Wyllie was published by the University of Adelaide in 2006, and updated in 2014.

In 2024, MIT Press published the book R.U.R. and the Vision of Artificial Life, which offered a new translation of the original 1920 edition by Štěpán Šimek. The book also contained a collection of essays reflecting on the play's legacy from scientists and scholars who work in artificial life and robotics.

=== Critical reception ===
Reviewing the New York production of R.U.R. in 1922, The Forum magazine described the play as "thought-provoking" and "a highly original thriller". John Clute has lauded R.U.R. as "a play of exorbitant wit and almost demonic energy" and lists the play as one of the "classic titles" of inter-war science fiction. Luciano Floridi has described the play thus: "Philosophically rich and controversial, R.U.R. was unanimously acknowledged as a masterpiece from its first appearance, and has become a classic of technologically dystopian literature." Jarka M. Burien called R.U.R. a "theatrically effective, prototypal sci-fi melodrama".

On the other hand, Isaac Asimov, author of the Robot series of books and creator of the Three Laws of Robotics, stated: "Čapek's play is, in my own opinion, a terribly bad one, but it is immortal for that one word. It contributed the word 'robot' not only to English, but through English, to all the languages in which science fiction is now written." In fact, Asimov's "Laws of Robotics" are specifically and explicitly designed to prevent the kind of situation depicted in R.U.R., since Asimov's robots are created with a built-in total inhibition against harming human beings or disobeying them.

Despite getting mostly positive responses, Čapek himself was very disappointed by critics' simplistic understanding of the play. He saw the play as part comedy, and ending with faith that humanity would survive albeit in a different form, while the critics often considered it to be pessimistic or nihilistic, and purely either an updated Frankenstein, an anti-capitalist satire, or a critique of contemporary political ideologies. The critics' interpretation may have been influenced by how heavily abridged the final act (or Epilogue) was in the Selver/Playfair translation.

== Adaptations ==
- On 11 February 1938, a 35-minute adaptation of a section of the play was broadcast on BBC Television — the first piece of television science-fiction ever to be broadcast. Some low quality stills have survived, although no recordings of the production are known to exist. In 1948, another television adaptation – this time of the entire play, running to 90 minutes — was broadcast by the BBC, with Radius played by Patrick Troughton. Although some photographs exist, no audio or visual recordings of this production survive.
- BBC Radio has broadcast a number of productions, including a 1927 2LO London version, a 1933 BBC Regional Programme version, a 1941 BBC Home Service version, and a 1946 BBC Home Service version. BBC Radio 3 dramatised the play again in 1989, and this version has been released commercially. A light-hearted 2-part musical adaptation was broadcast on April 3 and 10, 2022, on BBC Radio 4, with story by Robert Hudson and music by Susannah Pearse; the second episode continues the story after all humans have been killed and the robots now have emotions.
- The Hollywood Theater of the Ear dramatized an unabridged audio version of R.U.R., which is available on the collection 2000^{x}: Tales of the Next Millennia.
- In August 2010, Portuguese multi-media artist Leonel Moura's R.U.R.: The Birth of the Robot, inspired by the Čapek play, was performed at Itaú Cultural in São Paulo, Brazil. It utilized actual robots on stage interacting with the human actors.
- Director James Kerwin's 1960s-style short film R.U.R.: Genesis — starring Chase Masterson and Kipleigh Brown and loosely based upon the Čapek play—was shot in 2013. After playing on the festival circuit, the film screened at Cafe Neu Romance in Prague in 2015 and was released on Amazon Prime Video and YouTube.
- An electro-rock musical, Save the Robots is based on R.U.R., featuring the music of the New York City pop-punk art-rock band Hagatha. This version with book and adaptation by E. Ether, music by Rob Susman, and lyrics by Clark Render was an official selection of the 2014 New York Musical Theatre Festival season.
- On 26 November 2015 The RUR-Play: Prologue, the world's first version of R.U.R. with robots appearing in all the roles, was presented during the robot performance festival of Cafe Neu Romance at the gallery of the National Library of Technology in Prague. The concept and initiative for the play came from Christian Gjørret, leader of "Vive Les Robots!" who, on 29 January 2012, during a meeting with Steven Canvin of LEGO Group, presented the proposal to Lego, that supported the piece with the LEGO MINDSTORMS robotic kit. The robots were built and programmed by students from the R.U.R team from Gymnázium Jeseník. The play was directed by Filip Worm and the team was led by Roman Chasák, both teachers from the Gymnázium Jeseník.
- On 28 May 2022, Toronto's Tapestry Opera premiered R.U.R. (A Torrent of Light), composed by Nicole Lizée with a libretto by Nicolas Billon. The opera went on to win 6 Dora Mavor Moore Awards and the 2023 Music Critics Association of North America Award for Best New Opera.
- On 21 June 2024 an adaptation of the play was staged in Australia at Phoenix Theatre, Coniston. The adaptation leaned into the science fiction inspiration it gave, with the scripts alteration containing over 100 references to popular sci-fi franchises otherwise inspired by R.U.R. The play is available to watch on YouTube.
- In 2024, Australian filmmaker Alex Proyas began filming a feature film musical adaptation of the play.
- A separate adaptation is being developing by James Kerwin, who previously created the short film R.U.R.: Genesis.
- In 2022, Sam Bass Community Theatre in Austin Texas presented a modernized take on the play, with influences from Westworld and Apple technologies.

== In popular culture ==
- Eric, a robot constructed in Britain in 1928 for public appearances, bore the letters "R.U.R." across its chest.
- The Soviet film Loss of Sensation (1935), although directly based on the novel Iron Riot (1929), has a similar concept to R.U.R., and all the robots in the film prominently display the name "R.U.R.".
- In the American science fiction television series Dollhouse, the antagonist corporation, Rossum Corp., is named after the play.
- In the Star Trek episode "Requiem for Methuselah", the android's name is Rayna Kapec (an anagram, though not a homophone, of Capek, that is, Čapek without its háček).
- In the two-part Batman: The Animated Series episode "Heart of Steel", the scientist that created the HARDAC machine is named Karl Rossum. HARDAC created mechanical replicants to replace existing humans, with the ultimate goal of replacing all humans. One of the robots is seen driving a car with "RUR" as the license plate number.
- In the 1977 Doctor Who serial "The Robots of Death", the robot servants turn on their human masters under the influence of an individual named Taren Capel.
- In the Norwegian TV series Blindpassasjer (1978), Rossum is the name of a planet ruled by robots.
- In the rebooted science fiction series The Outer Limits (1995), in the remake of the "I, Robot" episode from the original 1964 series, the business where the robot Adam Link is built is named "Rossum Hall Robotics".
- The Blake's 7 radio play The Syndeton Experiment (1999) included a character named Dr. Rossum who turned humans into robots.
- In the "Fear of a Bot Planet" episode of the animated science fiction TV series Futurama, the Planet Express crew is ordered to make a delivery on a planet called "Chapek 9", which is inhabited solely by robots.
- Within the 2005 IDW continuity of Transformers, the concept of the brain module, spark, and transformation cog being vital and dependent on the health of each other is called "Rossum's Trinity".
- In Howard Chaykin's Time² graphic novels, Rossum's Universal Robots is a powerful corporation and maker of robots.
- In Spacehunter: Adventures in the Forbidden Zone, when Wolff wakes Chalmers, she has been reading a copy of R.U.R. in her bed. This presages the fact that she is later revealed to be a gynoid.
- In the 2016 video game Deus Ex: Mankind Divided, R.U.R. is performed in an underground theater in a dystopian Prague by an "augmented" (cyborg) woman who believes herself to be the robot Helena.
- The main protagonist in Peter Brown’s The Wild Robot series (2016-2023) is “a robot character named Rozzum (a subtle nod to Čapek’s play)”.
- In the 2018 British alternative history drama Agatha and the Truth of Murder, Agatha is seen reading R.U.R. to her daughter Rosalind as a bedtime story.
- In the film Mother/Android (2021), the play R.U.R. of Karel Čapek comes up. In the movie, Arthur, an AI programmer, turns out to be an android.
- A musical titled Entropics, based on the R.U.R. play, has been written and performed in Chicago in 2024.
- The Capek typeface, designed in 2024 by the french artist Aurélien Vret for Typofonderie, is based on the R.U.R. first edition cover.
- In the 2024 American animated movie The Wild Robot, the model name of the protagonist robot is "ROZZUM Unit 7134".

== See also ==
- AI takeover
- The Steam Man of the Prairies (1868), an early American depiction of a "mechanical man"
- Tik-Tok, L. Frank Baum's earlier depiction (1907) of a similar entity
- Detroit: Become Human (2018), a narrative video game built around a rebellion by androids who become sentient.
