= Nikos =

Nikos (Greek: Νίκος, Níkos) is a Greek given name. It originates from Greek Nikolaos, which means "victory of the people". Although used as a proper first name, Nikos is also a popular nickname of the original Nikolaos (Greek) or Nicholas (English).

== People ==
- Nikos Alefantos, Greek football coach
- Nikos Aliagas, Greek TV host
- Nikos Anastopoulos, Greek footballer
- Nikos Arabatzis, Greek footballer
- Nikos Argiropoulos, Greek basketball player
- Nikos Babaniotis, Greek footballer
- Nikos Barboudis, Greek footballer
- Nikos Barlos, Greek basketball player
- Nikos Beloyannis, Greek communist and resistance leader
- Nikos Boudouris, Greek basketball player
- Nikos Boutzikos, Greek footballer
- Nikos Christodoulou, Greek conductor and composer
- Nikos Christodoulides, Greek Cypriot politician
- Nikos Dabizas, Greek footballer
- Nikos Dimitrakos, American ice-hockey player
- Nikos Dimou, Greek writer
- Nikos Ekonomou, Greek basketball player
- Nikos Engonopoulos, Greek painter and poet
- Nikos Filippou, Greek basketball player
- Nick Galis, Greek basketball player
- Nikos Gatsos, Greek poet
- Nikos Ghalas, Greek footballer
- Nikos Gounaris, Greek singer and songwriter
- Nikos Hadjikyriakos-Ghikas, Greek artist, writer and academic
- Nikos Hadjinikolaou, Greek journalist
- Nikos Hatzis, Greek basketball player
- Nikos Hatzivrettas, Greek basketball player
- Nikos Kaklamanakis, Greek windsurfer and sailor
- Nikos Kaklamanos, Greek basketball player
- Nikos Kalafatis, Greek footballer
- Nikos Kalokairis, Greek footballer
- Nikos Karageorgiou, Greek footballer
- Nikos Karouzos, Greek poet
- Nikos Karvelas, Greek songwriter and singer
- Nikos Katsavakis, Greek footballer
- Nikos Kazantzakis, Greek writer and philosopher
- Nikos Kavvadias, Greek poet and writer
- Nikos Konstantopoulos, Greek politician
- Nikos Kostakis, Greek footballer
- Nikos Kostenoglou, Greek footballer
- Nikos Koundouros, Greek film director
- Nikos Kourkoulos, Greek actor
- Nikos Krotsidhas, Greek footballer
- Nikos Liberopoulos, Greek footballer
- Nikos Lorentzos, Greek informatics professor
- Nikos Machlas, Greek footballer
- Nikos Mastorakis, Greek filmmaker and radio producer
- Nikos Mihas, Greek singer and songwriter
- Nikos Nicolaides, Greek painter and writer
- Nikos Nicolaou (footballer born 1973), Cypriot midfielder
- Nikos Nicolaou (footballer born 1978), Cypriot defender
- Nikos Nikolaidis, Greek director and a writer
- Nikos Nikolaou, Greek artist
- Nikos Nioplias, Greek footballer
- Nikos Nisiotis, Greek basketball coach
- Nikos Pantidos, Greek footballer
- Nikos Papadopoulos, several people of that name
- Nikos Papanikolaou (basketball), Greek basketball player
- Nikos Papatakis, Greek film director
- Nikos Pateras, Greek ship magnate
- Nikos Perakis, Greek writer and film director
- Nikos Ploumpidis, Greek communist and resistance fighter
- Nikos Poulantzas, Greco-French political sociologist
- Nikos Rizos, Greek actor
- Nikos Sampson, Cypriot coup d'état president
- Nikos Sarganis, Greek footballer
- Nikos Sergianopoulos, Greek actor
- Nikos Skalkottas, Greek composer
- Nikos Skarmoutsos, Greek footballer
- Nikos Spiropoulos, Greek footballer
- Nikos Stavropoulos, Greek basketball player
- Nikos Tselios, Irish-American ice hockey player
- Nikos Tsiantakis, Greek footballer
- Nikos Tsiforos, Greek writer and film director
- Nikos Tzogias, Greek actor
- Nikos Vakalis, Greek politician
- Nikos Vertis, Greek singer
- Nikos Voutsis, Greek politician
- Nikos Xanthopoulos, Greek actor
- Nikos Xanthoulis, Greek musician and composer
- Nikos Xilouris, Greek singer and songwriter
- Nikos Xydakis (journalist), Greek journalist and politician
- Nikos Xydakis (musician), Greek songwriter, pianist and singer
- Nikos Zachariadis, Greek politician
- Nikolaos Zisis, Greek basketball player

== Fictional characters ==
- Nikos, a fictional character on EastEnders
- Pyrrha Nikos, a fictional character from the American web series RWBY

== Other ==
- Nikos, international underwear and accessories company.
- Nikos the Impaler, a b-grade splatter film (2003)
- MV Nikos (1935), a Panamanian cargo ship in service under this name in 1970

== See also ==
- Nikoś
- Nico
- Nico (given name)
- Nicos
