= Nikodem =

Nikodem is a masculine given name. It is a variant of the given name Nicodemus. Notable people with the name include:

- Nikodem Caro
- Nikodem Fiedosewicz
- Nikodem Milewski
- Nikodem Piotrowski
- Nikodem Popławski
- Nikodem Skotarczak, Polish gangster and criminal businessman
- Nikodem Sujecki
- Nikodem Sulik-Sarnowski

== Fictional characters ==
- Nikodem Dyzma

== See also ==
- See "Nicodemus" for other variants
- Nikoś
- Nikodym
