= Nicodemus (disambiguation) =

Nicodemus was a Pharisee who showed favor to Jesus.

Nicodemus may also refer to:

== Places ==
- Nicodemus, Kansas
  - Nicodemus National Historic Site, commemorating the founding of Nicodemus, Kansas, by African Americans after the American Civil War

== People ==
- Nicodemus (given name)
- Nicodemus (musician)
- Fred Nicodemus, a physicist, author of the bidirectional reflectance distribution function
- John D. Nicodemus (1864–1934), American politician from Maryland
- Nickodemus (DJ), American DJ and musician

== Apocryphal Gospel ==
- Gospel of Nicodemus, a fourth century CE Apocryphal Gospel, claimed to be derived from a work by Nicodemus from St. John's Gospel

== Fictional characters ==
- Nicodemus, a wise rat who helps the title character in the book Mrs. Frisby and the Rats of NIMH and in the 1982 animated film adaptation The Secret of NIMH
- Nicodemus, Robin Williams' character's dog in the License to Wed
- Nicodemus, a villain in Batman
- Nicodemus Archleone, a villain in The Dresden Files
- Nicodemus, father of Empress Eartia in the American comic book Atarian Conquest
- Nicodemus Boffin, nouveau riche character in Charles Dickens' Our Mutual Friend
- Nicodemus Dumps, misanthropic character in Charles Dickens' Sketches by Boz tale the Bloomsbury Christening
- Nicodemus Legend, the protagonist in the television series Legend
- Nicodemus, the deputy of the sheriff (Gospel Bill) in the Christian children's show The Gospel Bill Show

== Television ==
- "Nicodemus" (Smallville episode), a 2002 episode of the first season of Smallville

== See also ==
- Nicodème, a given name
