= 2022–23 Borussia Dortmund season =

114th season in existence of Borussia Dortmund

Borussia Dortmund
2022–23 season
- Chairman: Hans-Joachim Watzke (CEO)
- Head coach: Edin Terzić
- Stadium: Westfalenstadion
- Bundesliga: 2nd
- DFB-Pokal: Quarter-finals
- UEFA Champions League: Round of 16
- Top goalscorer: League: Julian Brandt; Sébastien Haller; Donyell Malen (9 each); All: Jude Bellingham (14)
- Highest home attendance: 81,365 (15 matches)
- Lowest home attendance: 70,700 v Copenhagen
- Average home league attendance: 81,074
- Biggest win: 6–0 vs VfL Wolfsburg (H)
- Biggest defeat: 0–3 vs RB Leipzig (A)
Home colours	Away colours	Cup/European colours

The 2022–23 season was the 114th season in the existence of Borussia Dortmund and the club's 47th consecutive season in the top flight of German football. In addition to the domestic league, they participated in this season's editions of the DFB-Pokal and UEFA Champions League.

The season was the first since 2007–08 without Marcel Schmelzer, who retired after the 2021–22 campaign.

== Players ==
=== First team squad ===
As of 31 January 2023

Note: Flags indicate national team as defined under FIFA eligibility rules; some limited exceptions apply. Players may hold more than one non-FIFA nationality.

No.	Pos.	Nation	Player
1	GK	SUI	Gregor Kobel
2	DF	ESP	Mateu Morey
4	DF	GER	Nico Schlotterbeck
6	MF	TUR	Salih Özcan
7	MF	USA	Giovanni Reyna
8	MF	GER	Mahmoud Dahoud
9	FW	CIV	Sébastien Haller
11	FW	GER	Marco Reus (captain)
13	DF	POR	Raphaël Guerreiro
14	DF	GER	Nico Schulz
15	DF	GER	Mats Hummels (vice-captain)
16	FW	BEL	Julien Duranville
17	MF	GER	Marius Wolf
18	FW	GER	Youssoufa Moukoko
19	MF	GER	Julian Brandt
20	FW	FRA	Anthony Modeste
21	FW	NED	Donyell Malen
22	MF	ENG	Jude Bellingham (3rd captain)

No.	Pos.	Nation	Player
23	MF	GER	Emre Can
24	DF	BEL	Thomas Meunier
25	DF	GER	Niklas Süle
26	DF	NOR	Julian Ryerson
27	FW	GER	Karim Adeyemi
30	DF	GER	Felix Passlack
32	MF	GUI	Abdoulaye Kamara
33	GK	GER	Alexander Meyer
35	GK	POL	Marcel Lotka
36	MF	GER	Tom Rothe
38	GK	GER	Luca Unbehaun
42	MF	TUR	Göktan Gürpüz
43	MF	ENG	Jamie Bynoe-Gittens
44	DF	FRA	Soumaila Coulibaly
46	FW	CRO	Marco Pašalić
47	DF	GER	Antonios Papadopoulos
49	FW	GER	Justin Njinmah

=== Out on loan ===
Note: Flags indicate national team as defined under FIFA eligibility rules; some limited exceptions apply. Players may hold more than one non-FIFA nationality.

No.	Pos.	Nation	Player
—	FW	NED	Jayden Braaf (at Hellas Verona until 30 June 2023)
—	MF	BEL	Thorgan Hazard (at PSV until 30 June 2023)
—	FW	GER	Ansgar Knauff (at Eintracht Frankfurt until 30 June 2023)

== Transfers ==
=== In ===
No.	Pos.	Player	Transferred from	Fee	Date	Source
25	DF	(Germany) Niklas Süle	(Germany) Bayern Munich	Free transfer	1 July 2022	
33	GK	(Germany) Alexander Meyer	(Germany) Jahn Regensburg	Free transfer	1 July 2022	
35	GK	(Poland) Marcel Lotka	(Germany) Hertha BSC	Free transfer	1 July 2022	
–	FW	(Netherlands) Jayden Braaf	(England) Manchester City	Free transfer	1 July 2022	
4	DF	(Germany) Nico Schlotterbeck	(Germany) SC Freiburg	€20,000,000	1 July 2022	
6	MF	(Turkey) Salih Özcan	(Germany) 1. FC Köln	€5,000,000	1 July 2022	
27	FW	(Germany) Karim Adeyemi	(Austria) Red Bull Salzburg	€30,000,000	1 July 2022	
9	FW	(Ivory Coast) Sébastien Haller	(Netherlands) Ajax	€31,000,000	6 July 2022	
20	FW	(France) Anthony Modeste	(Germany) 1. FC Köln	€5,100,000	8 August 2022	
26	DF	(Norway) Julian Ryerson	(Germany) Union Berlin	€5,000,000	17 January 2023	
16	FW	(Belgium) Julien Duranville	(Belgium) Anderlecht	€8,500,000	27 January 2023	

=== Out ===
No.	Pos.	Player	Transferred to	Fee	Date	Source
5	DF	(France) Dan-Axel Zagadou	(Germany) VfB Stuttgart	Free transfer	1 July 2022	
28	MF	(Belgium) Axel Witsel	(Spain) Atlético Madrid	Free transfer	1 July 2022	
35	GK	(Switzerland) Marwin Hitz	(Switzerland) Basel	Free transfer	1 July 2022	
38	GK	(Switzerland) Roman Bürki	(United States) St. Louis City	Free transfer	1 July 2022	
40	GK	(Germany) Stefan Drljača	(Germany) Dynamo Dresden	Free transfer	1 July 2022	
20	FW	(Brazil) Reinier	(Spain) Real Madrid	End of loan	1 July 2022	
34	DF	(Croatia) Marin Pongračić	(Germany) VfL Wolfsburg	End of loan	1 July 2022	
29	DF	(Germany) Marcel Schmelzer	N/A	Retired	1 July 2022	
9	FW	(Norway) Erling Haaland	(England) Manchester City	€60,000,000	1 July 2022	
27	FW	(Germany) Steffen Tigges	(Germany) 1. FC Köln	€1,500,000	1 July 2022	
16	DF	(Switzerland) Manuel Akanji	(England) Manchester City	€18,000,000	1 September 2022	
–	FW	(Netherlands) Jayden Braaf	(Italy) Hellas Verona	Loan	17 January 2023	
10	MF	(Belgium) Thorgan Hazard	(Netherlands) PSV Eindhoven	Loan	31 January 2023	

== Pre-season and friendlies ==
Win Draw Loss Fixtures

=== Pre-season ===
5 July 2022 Friendly	Lüner SV	1–3	Borussia Dortmund	Lünen, Germany
19:00 CEST (UTC+2)	Anafai 78'	Report	Gürpüz (yellow card) 37'; Aning 45'; Fink 54'; Gürpüz 62'	Stadium: Stadion Schwansbell; Attendance: 3,000

9 July 2022 Friendly	Dynamo Dresden	0–2	Borussia Dortmund	Dresden, Germany
17:00 CEST (UTC+2)		Report	Hummels 13'; Papadopoulos 41'	Stadium: Rudolf-Harbig-Stadion; Attendance: 23,816

14 July 2022 Friendly	SC Verl	0–5	Borussia Dortmund	Verl, Germany
18:00 CEST (UTC+2)	Bürger (yellow card) 17'; Stellwagen (yellow card) 36'	Report	Pohlmann 16'; Moukoko 28', 42'; Dahoud 37'; Aning 54' (pen.)	Stadium: Sportclub-Arena; Attendance: 5,000

18 July 2022 Friendly	Borussia Dortmund	1–3	Valencia	Altach, Austria
19:00 CEST (UTC+2)	Reus 51' (pen.)	Report	Guedes 40', 62'; Marcos André 58'	Stadium: Stadion Schnabelholz; Referee: Walter Altmann (Austria)

22 July 2022 Friendly	Borussia Dortmund	0–2	Villarreal	Altach, Austria
19:00 CEST (UTC+2)	Süle (yellow card) 74'	Report	Gerard 45'; Chukwueze 67'	Stadium: Stadion Schnabelholz; Referee: Sebastian Gishamer (Austria)

30 July 2022 Friendly	Borussia Dortmund	1–1	Antalyaspor	Dortmund, Germany
17:00 CEST (UTC+2)	Brandt 8'	Report	Ndao 60'	Stadium: Borussia Dortmund Trainingsgelände; Attendance: 800

=== Mid-season ===
24 November 2022 Southeast Asia tour	Lion City Sailors	2–7	Borussia Dortmund	Jalan Besar, Singapore
13:30 CET (UTC+1)	Amirul (yellow card) 33'; Quak 68'; Faris 90+1'	Report	Malen 32', 35', 45'; Bamba 64', 72'; Rijkhoff 84'; Njinmah 86'	Stadium: Jalan Besar Stadium; Attendance: 4,800; Referee: Ahmad A'Qashah (Singapore)

28 November 2022 Southeast Asia tour	Johor Darul Ta'zim	1–4	Borussia Dortmund	Johor, Malaysia
12:00 CET (UTC+1)	Aiman 41'	Report	Njinmah 10'; Malen 31'; Papadopoulos (yellow card) 57'; Pohlmann 59'; Bamba 70'; Ozcan (yellow card) 77'; Passlack (yellow card) 85'	Stadium: Sultan Ibrahim Stadium; Attendance: 30,000; Referee: Tuan Mohd Yasin (Malaysia)

10 December 2022 Christmas Cup	Rapid București	1–2	Borussia Dortmund	Bucharest, Romania
12:00 CET (UTC+1)	Ioniță 27'	Report	Pohlmann 12'; Reyna 50'	Stadium: Arena Națională; Referee: Cristian Moldoveanu (Romania)
Note: Match was played in two 30-minute halves.

10 December 2022 Christmas Cup	Borussia Dortmund	0–2	Fiorentina	Bucharest, Romania
13:30 CET (UTC+1)	Papadopoulos (yellow card) (yellow-red card) 58'	Report	Mandragora 35'; Bonaventura 39'	Stadium: Arena Națională; Referee: Andrei Moroiţă (Romania)
Note: Match was played in two thirty-minute halves.

10 January 2023 Friendly	Borussia Dortmund	5–1	Fortuna Düsseldorf	Marbella, Spain
16:00 CET (UTC+1)	Passlack 5'; Adeyemi 32'; Schlotterbeck 81'; Malen 86', 88'	Report	Kownacki 7' (pen.)	Stadium: Marbella Football Center; Attendance: 500; Referee: Sánchez Sánchez (Spain)

13 January 2023 Friendly	Borussia Dortmund	6–0	Basel	Marbella, Spain
15:30 CET (UTC+1)	Reus 39'; Malen 49'; Bellingham 54' (pen.); Haller 81' (pen.), 86', 88'	Report	Kasim (yellow card) 48'; Hitz (yellow card) 53'	Stadium: Marbella Football Center; Attendance: 300; Referee: Juan Antonio Manrique Antequera (Spain)
Note: Match was played in four periods of thirty minutes each.

=== Club vs Country ===
30 November 2022 Southeast Asia tour	Vietnam	2–1	Borussia Dortmund	Hanoi, Vietnam
13:00 CET (UTC+1)	Nguyễn Tiến Linh 36'; Phạm Tuấn Hải 90' (pen.)	Report	Malen 13'	Stadium: Mỹ Đình National Stadium; Referee: Nazmi Nasaruddin (Malaysia)

== Competitions ==
=== Overall record ===
Competition	First match	Last match	Starting round	Final position	Record							
Competition	First match	Last match	Starting round	Final position	Pld	W	D	L	GF	GA	GD	Win %
Bundesliga	6 August 2022	27 May 2023	Matchday 1	2nd	34	22	5	7	83	44	+39	64.71
DFB-Pokal	29 July 2022	5 April 2023	First round	Quarter-finals	4	3	0	1	7	3	+4	75.00
UEFA Champions League	6 September 2022	7 March 2023	Group stage	Round of 16	8	3	3	2	11	7	+4	37.50
Total					46	28	8	10	101	54	+47	60.87

Source: Soccerway

=== Bundesliga ===
==== League table ====
Pos	Team	Pld	W	D	L	GF	GA	GD	Pts	Qualification or relegation
1	Bayern Munich (C)	34	21	8	5	92	38	+54	71	Qualification for the Champions League group stage
2	Borussia Dortmund	34	22	5	7	83	44	+39	71	Qualification for the Champions League group stage
3	RB Leipzig	34	20	6	8	64	41	+23	66	Qualification for the Champions League group stage
4	Union Berlin	34	18	8	8	51	38	+13	62	Qualification for the Champions League group stage
5	SC Freiburg	34	17	8	9	51	44	+7	59	Qualification for the Europa League group stage (Note: Since the 2022–23 DFB-Pokal winners, RB Leipzig, qualified for the Champions League based on league position, the Europa League group stage spot was passed to the sixth-placed team, and the Europa Conference League play-off round spot was passed to the seventh-placed team.)

Source: DFB
Rules for classification: 1) Points; 2) Goal difference; 3) Goals scored; 4) Head-to-head results; 5) Head-to-head away goals scored; 6) Away goals scored; 7) Play-off.
(C) Champions

==== Results summary ====
Overall								Home						Away					
Pld	W	D	L	GF	GA	GD	Pts	W	D	L	GF	GA	GD	W	D	L	GF	GA	GD
34	22	5	7	83	44	+39	71	14	2	1	55	17	+38	8	3	6	28	27	+1

Source: DFB

==== Results by round ====
Round	1	2	3	4	5	6	7	8	9	10	11	12	13	14	15	16	17	18	19	20	21	22	23	24	25	26	27	28	29	30	31	32	33	34
Ground	H	A	H	A	H	A	H	A	H	A	H	A	H	A	A	H	A	A	H	A	H	A	H	A	H	A	H	A	H	A	H	H	A	H
Result	W	W	L	W	W	L	W	L	D	L	W	W	W	L	L	W	W	W	W	W	W	W	W	D	W	L	W	D	W	D	W	W	W	D
Position	7	2	7	5	2	5	2	4	4	8	5	4	4	6	6	6	5	4	3	3	2	2	2	2	1	2	2	2	1	2	2	2	1	2

Source: DFB
A = Away; H = Home; W = Win; D = Draw; L = Loss

==== Matches ====
The league fixtures were announced on 17 June 2022.

6 August 2022 1	Borussia Dortmund	1–0	Bayer Leverkusen	Dortmund
18:30 CEST (UTC+2)	Reus 10'; Hazard (yellow card) 43'; Schlotterbeck (yellow card) 72'	Report	Tah (yellow card) 27'; Palacios (yellow card) 37'; Hincapié (yellow card) 56'; Hrádecký (red card) 90+2'; Bakker (yellow card) 90+5'	Stadium: Signal Iduna Park; Attendance: 81,365; Referee: Felix Brych

12 August 2022 2	SC Freiburg	1–3	Borussia Dortmund	Freiburg
20:30 CEST (UTC+2)	Gregoritsch 35'; Kyereh (yellow card) 86'	Report	Meunier (yellow card) 33'; Bellingham (yellow card) 60'; Schlotterbeck (yellow card) 67'; Bynoe-Gittens 77'; Moukoko 84'; Wolf 88'	Stadium: SC-Stadion; Attendance: 34,700; Referee: Tobias Welz

20 August 2022 3	Borussia Dortmund	2–3	Werder Bremen	Dortmund
15:30 CEST (UTC+2)	Modeste (yellow card) 39'; Can (yellow card) 42'; Brandt 45+2'; Guerreiro 77'; Wolf (yellow card) 83'; Reus (yellow card) 90+1'	Report	Füllkrug (yellow card) 29'; Buchanan 89'; Schmidt 90+3'; Burke 90+5'	Stadium: Signal Iduna Park; Attendance: 81,365; Referee: Florian Badstübner

27 August 2022 4	Hertha BSC	0–1	Borussia Dortmund	Berlin
15:30 CEST (UTC+2)	Richter (yellow card) 90+2'	Report	Modeste 32'	Stadium: Olympiastadion; Attendance: 62,142; Referee: Tobias Stieler

2 September 2022 5	Borussia Dortmund	1–0	1899 Hoffenheim	Dortmund
20:30 CEST (UTC+2)	Reus 16', (yellow card) 57'; Bellingham (yellow card) 57'; Hummels (yellow card) 76'	Report	Skov (yellow card) 35'; Vogt (yellow card) 57'; Kabak (yellow card) 64'; Kramarić (yellow card) 80'	Stadium: Signal Iduna Park; Attendance: 79,300; Referee: Daniel Siebert

10 September 2022 6	RB Leipzig	3–0	Borussia Dortmund	Leipzig
15:30 CEST (UTC+2)	Orbán 6'; Szoboszlai 45'; Laimer (yellow card) 75'; Haidara 84'; Raum (yellow card) 89'	Report	Meunier (yellow card) 58'	Stadium: Red Bull Arena; Attendance: 47,069; Referee: Sven Jablonski

17 September 2022 7	Borussia Dortmund	1–0	Schalke 04	Dortmund
15:30 CEST (UTC+2)	Modeste (yellow card) 45'; Moukoko 79'; Adeyemi (yellow card) 83'; Can (yellow card) 85'	Report	Van den Berg (yellow card) 20'; Terodde (yellow card) 39'	Stadium: Signal Iduna Park; Attendance: 81,100; Referee: Felix Brych

1 October 2022 8	1. FC Köln	3–2	Borussia Dortmund	Cologne
15:30 CEST (UTC+2)	Hübers (yellow card) 21'; Duda (yellow card) 25'; Kainz 53'; Tigges 56'; Ljubičić 71'; Schindler (yellow card) 79'; Huseinbasic (yellow card) 90'	Report	Adeyemi (yellow card) 23'; Guerreiro (yellow card) 29'; Brandt 31'; Süle (yellow card) 36'; Schmitz 78' (o.g.)	Stadium: RheinEnergieStadion; Attendance: 50,000; Referee: Harm Osmers

8 October 2022 9	Borussia Dortmund	2–2	Bayern Munich	Dortmund
18:30 CEST (UTC+2)	Bellingham (yellow card) 14'; Can (yellow card) 40'; Moukoko 74'; Adeyemi (yellow card) 90+2'; Modeste 90+5'	Report	Sabitzer (yellow card) 2'; De Ligt (yellow card) 11'; Goretzka 33', (yellow card) 57'; Sané 53', (yellow card) 90+2'; Coman (yellow card) 77' (yellow-red card) 90'	Stadium: Signal Iduna Park; Attendance: 81,365; Referee: Deniz Aytekin

16 October 2022 10	Union Berlin	2–0	Borussia Dortmund	Berlin
17:30 CEST (UTC+2)	Haberer 8', 21'; Baumgartl (yellow card) 16'	Report	Özcan (yellow card) 29'; Schlotterbeck (yellow card) 55'	Stadium: Stadion An der Alten Försterei; Attendance: 22,012; Referee: Tobias Stieler

22 October 2022 11	Borussia Dortmund	5–0	VfB Stuttgart	Dortmund
15:30 CEST (UTC+2)	Bellingham 2', 53'; Süle 13'; Reyna 44'; Özcan (yellow card) 45+1'; Hummels (yellow card) 66'; Moukoko 72'	Report		Stadium: Signal Iduna Park; Attendance: 81,365; Referee: Daniel Schlager

29 October 2022 12	Eintracht Frankfurt	1–2	Borussia Dortmund	Frankfurt
18:30 CEST (UTC+2)	Pellegrini (yellow card) 16'; Kamada 26'; Lindstrøm (yellow card) 59'; Rode (yellow card) 90+2'; Tuta (yellow card) 90+5'; Trapp (yellow card) 90+5'	Report	Brandt 20'; Bellingham 52', (yellow card) 90+5'; Özcan (yellow card) 66'; Can (yellow card) 70'; Hummels (yellow card) 81'; Reyna (yellow card) 90+5'	Stadium: Deutsche Bank Park; Attendance: 50,000; Referee: Sascha Stegemann

5 November 2022 13	Borussia Dortmund	3–0	VfL Bochum	Dortmund
15:30 CET (UTC+1)	Moukoko 8', 45+2'; Reyna 12' (pen.); Özcan (yellow card) 79'	Report	Gamboa (yellow card) 54'	Stadium: Signal Iduna Park; Attendance: 81,365; Referee: Tobias Stieler

8 November 2022 14	VfL Wolfsburg	2–0	Borussia Dortmund	Wolfsburg
18:30 CET (UTC+1)	Van de Ven 6'; F. Nmecha (yellow card) 45+1'; Marmoush (yellow card) 54'; L. Nmecha (yellow card) 76', (goal) 90+1'	Report	Hummels (yellow card) 84'; Modeste (yellow card) 90+4'	Stadium: Volkswagen Arena; Attendance: 28,675; Referee: Christian Dingert

11 November 2022 15	Borussia Mönchengladbach	4–2	Borussia Dortmund	Mönchengladbach
20:30 CET (UTC+1)	Hofmann 4'; Stindl (yellow card) 9'; Bensebaini 26'; Thuram 30'; Koné 46'	Report	Brandt 19'; Hummels (yellow card) 25'; Guerreiro (yellow card) 34'; Schlotterbeck 40'	Stadium: Borussia-Park; Attendance: 54,042; Referee: Sven Jablonski

22 January 2023 16	Borussia Dortmund	4–3	FC Augsburg	Dortmund
15:30 CET (UTC+1)	Bellingham 29', (yellow card) 84'; Schlotterbeck 42'; Bynoe-Gittens 75'; Reyna 78'	Report	Maier 40'; Valentin (yellow card) 45'; Demirović 45+1'; Cardona (yellow card) 54'; Jensen (yellow card) 69'; Čolina 77'; Engels (yellow card) 90+2'	Stadium: Signal Iduna Park; Attendance: 81,365; Referee: Frank Willenborg

25 January 2023 17	Mainz 05	1–2	Borussia Dortmund	Mainz
18:30 CET (UTC+1)	Lee Jae-sung 2', (yellow card) 34'; Fernandes (yellow card) 76'	Report	Ryerson 4'; Reyna 90+3'	Stadium: Mewa Arena; Attendance: 31,500; Referee: Sascha Stegemann

29 January 2023 18	Bayer Leverkusen	0–2	Borussia Dortmund	Leverkusen
15:30 CET (UTC+1)	Tapsoba (yellow card) 28'; Wirtz (yellow card) 60'	Report	Adeyemi 33', (yellow card) 34'; Tapsoba 53' (o.g.); Özcan (yellow card) 60'; Modeste (yellow card) 84'; Ryerson (yellow card) 90'	Stadium: BayArena; Attendance: 30,210; Referee: Tobias Welz

4 February 2023 19	Borussia Dortmund	5–1	SC Freiburg	Dortmund
15:30 CET (UTC+1)	Guerreiro (yellow card) 23'; Schlotterbeck 26'; Adeyemi (yellow card) 27', (goal) 48'; Brandt (yellow card) 35'; Haller 51'; Brandt 69'; Reyna 82'	Report	Sildillia (yellow card) 15' (yellow-red card) 17'; Höler 45'; Kyereh (yellow card) 56'; Gregoritsch (yellow card) 78'	Stadium: Signal Iduna Park; Attendance: 81,365; Referee: Robert Schröder

11 February 2023 20	Werder Bremen	0–2	Borussia Dortmund	Bremen
15:30 CET (UTC+1)	Bittencourt (yellow card) 35'	Report	Bynoe-Gittens 67'; Brandt 85'	Stadium: Weserstadion; Attendance: 42,100; Referee: Felix Brych

19 February 2023 21	Borussia Dortmund	4–1	Hertha BSC	Dortmund
17:30 CET (UTC+1)	Adeyemi 27'; Malen 32'; Ryerson (yellow card) 58'; Reus 76'; Brandt 90'	Report	Tousart 46'; Ciğerci (yellow card) 58'; Rogel (yellow card) 75'	Stadium: Signal Iduna Park; Attendance: 81,365; Referee: Harm Osmers

25 February 2023 22	1899 Hoffenheim	0–1	Borussia Dortmund	Sinsheim
15:30 CET (UTC+1)	Kabak (yellow card) 27'; Baumann (yellow card) 57'; Vogt (yellow card) 90+3'	Report	Brandt 43'; Bellingham (yellow card) 70'	Stadium: Rhein-Neckar-Arena; Attendance: 30,150; Referee: Martin Petersen

3 March 2023 23	Borussia Dortmund	2–1	RB Leipzig	Dortmund
20:30 CET (UTC+1)	Reus 21' (pen.); Özcan (yellow card) 29'; Can 39'; Brandt (yellow card) 52'	Report	Nkunku (yellow card) 15'; Haidara (yellow card) 17'; Halstenberg (yellow card) 38'; Silva (yellow card) 45+3'; Henrichs (yellow card) 52'; Forsberg 74'	Stadium: Signal Iduna Park; Attendance: 81,365; Referee: Sven Jablonski

11 March 2023 24	Schalke 04	2–2	Borussia Dortmund	Gelsenkirchen
18:30 CET (UTC+1)	Bülter 50'; Brunner (yellow card) 55'; Karaman 79'	Report	Schlotterbeck 38'; Guerreiro 60'; Can (yellow card) 90'	Stadium: Veltins-Arena; Attendance: 61,571; Referee: Marco Fritz

18 March 2023 25	Borussia Dortmund	6–1	1. FC Köln	Dortmund
18:30 CET (UTC+1)	Guerreiro 15'; Haller 17', 69'; Reus 32', 70'; Malen 36'; Dahoud (yellow card) 66'	Report	Selke 42'	Stadium: Signal Iduna Park; Attendance: 81,365; Referee: Daniel Siebert

1 April 2023 26	Bayern Munich	4–2	Borussia Dortmund	Munich
18:30 CEST (UTC+2)	Kobel 13' (o.g.); Müller 18', 23'; Coman 50'; Upamecano (yellow card) 64'	Report	Can (yellow card) 12', (goal) 72' (pen.); Malen 90'	Stadium: Allianz Arena; Attendance: 75,000; Referee: Marco Fritz

8 April 2023 27	Borussia Dortmund	2–1	Union Berlin	Dortmund
15:30 CEST (UTC+2)	Süle (yellow card) 1'; Adeyemi (yellow card) 16'; Malen 28'; Moukoko 79'; Reus (yellow card) 90'; Can (yellow card) 90+1'; Bynoe-Gittens (yellow card) 90+5'	Report	Behrens (yellow card) 54', (goal) 61'; Becker (yellow card) 56'	Stadium: Signal Iduna Park; Attendance: 81,365; Referee: Daniel Schlager

15 April 2023 28	VfB Stuttgart	3–3	Borussia Dortmund	Stuttgart
15:30 CEST (UTC+2)	Mavropanos (yellow card) 35' (yellow-red card) 39'; Endo (yellow card) 35'; Coulibaly 79'; Vagnoman 84'; Tomás (yellow card) 88'; Silas 90+7', (yellow card) 90+8'	Report	Haller 26'; Malen 33'; Bellingham (yellow card) 57'; Reus (yellow card) 71'; Reyna (yellow card) 86', (goal) 90+2'	Stadium: Mercedes-Benz Arena; Attendance: 47,300; Referee: Harm Osmers

22 April 2023 29	Borussia Dortmund	4–0	Eintracht Frankfurt	Dortmund
18:30 CEST (UTC+2)	Bellingham 19', (yellow card) 54'; Malen 24', 66'; Hummels 41'; Adeyemi (yellow card) 62'	Report	Lenz (yellow card) 13'; Kolo Muani (yellow card) 23'; Rode (yellow card) 49'	Stadium: Signal Iduna Park; Attendance: 81,365; Referee: Deniz Aytekin

28 April 2023 30	VfL Bochum	1–1	Borussia Dortmund	Bochum
20:30 CEST (UTC+2)	Losilla 5'; Soares (yellow card) 30'	Report	Adeyemi 7', (yellow card) 43'; Haller (yellow card) 43'	Stadium: Vonovia Ruhrstadion; Attendance: 26,000; Referee: Sascha Stegemann

7 May 2023 31	Borussia Dortmund	6–0	VfL Wolfsburg	Dortmund
17:30 CEST (UTC+2)	Adeyemi 14', 59', (penalty missed) 65'; Haller 28'; Malen 37'; Bellingham 54', 86'	Report	Fischer (yellow card) 64'	Stadium: Signal Iduna Park; Attendance: 81,365; Referee: Marco Fritz

13 May 2023 32	Borussia Dortmund	5–2	Borussia Mönchengladbach	Dortmund
18:30 CEST (UTC+2)	Malen 5'; Bellingham 18' (pen.); Haller 20', 32'; Reyna 90+4'	Report	Bensebaini 75' (pen.), (yellow card) 77'; Stindl 85'; Kramer (yellow card) 90+4'	Stadium: Signal Iduna Park; Attendance: 81,365; Referee: Daniel Schlager

21 May 2023 33	FC Augsburg	0–3	Borussia Dortmund	Augsburg
17:30 CEST (UTC+2)	Uduokhai (red card) 38'; Beljo (yellow card) 43'; Gouweleeuw (yellow card) 69'; Demirović (yellow card) 73'	Report	Can (yellow card) 47'; Haller 58', 84'; Adeyemi (yellow card) 69'; Wolf (yellow card) 74'; Brandt 90+3'	Stadium: WWK Arena; Attendance: 30,660; Referee: Tobias Welz

27 May 2023 34	Borussia Dortmund	2–2	Mainz 05	Dortmund
15:30 CEST (UTC+2)	Haller (penalty missed) 19'; Guerreiro (yellow card) 40', (goal) 69'; Süle 90+6'	Report	Hanche-Olsen 15'; Onisiwo 24'; Fernandes (yellow card) 71'	Stadium: Signal Iduna Park; Attendance: 81,365; Referee: Marco Fritz

=== DFB-Pokal ===
29 July 2022 First round	1860 Munich	0–3	Borussia Dortmund	Munich
20:46 CEST (UTC+2)	Lannert (yellow card) 12'; Lang (yellow card) 74'	Report	Malen 8'; Bellingham 31'; Adeyemi 35'	Stadium: Grünwalder Stadion; Attendance: 15,000; Referee: Benjamin Brand

19 October 2022 Second round	Hannover 96	0–2	Borussia Dortmund	Hannover
18:00 CEST (UTC+2)	Kunze (yellow card) 35'; Besuschkow (yellow card) 67'	Report	Arrey-Mbi 11' (o.g.); Hazard (yellow card) 38'; Bellingham 71' (pen.); Can (yellow card) 75'; Adeyemi (red card) 85'	Stadium: Niedersachsenstadion; Attendance: 49,000; Referee: Sven Jablonski

8 February 2023 Round of 16	VfL Bochum	1–2	Borussia Dortmund	Bochum
20:45 CET (UTC+1)	Janko (yellow card) 39'; Stöger (yellow card) 44', (goal) 64' (pen.); Antwi-Adjei (yellow card) 76'; Riemann (yellow card) 90+7'	Report	Can 45'; Reus 70'	Stadium: Ruhrstadion; Attendance: 26,000; Referee: Tobias Stieler

5 April 2023 Quarter-finals	RB Leipzig	2–0	Borussia Dortmund	Leipzig
20:45 CEST (UTC+2)	Werner 22'; Raum (yellow card) 58'; Szoboszlai (yellow card) 90+5'; Orbán 90+8'	Report	Ryerson (yellow card) 40'; Bellingham (yellow card) 85'; Malen (yellow card) 90+2'; Hummels (yellow card) 90+6'	Stadium: Red Bull Arena; Attendance: 47,069; Referee: Felix Brych

=== UEFA Champions League ===
==== Group stage ====
The group stage draw was held on 25 August 2022.

Pos	Team	Pld	W	D	L	GF	GA	GD	Pts	Qualification	MCI	DOR	SEV	CPH
1	(England) Manchester City	6	4	2	0	14	2	+12	14	Advance to knockout phase	—	2–1	3–1	5–0
2	(Germany) Borussia Dortmund	6	2	3	1	10	5	+5	9	Advance to knockout phase	0–0	—	1–1	3–0
3	(Spain) Sevilla	6	1	2	3	6	12	−6	5	Transfer to Europa League	0–4	1–4	—	3–0
4	(Denmark) Copenhagen	6	0	3	3	1	12	−11	3		0–0	1–1	0–0	—

Source: UEFA
Rules for classification: Group stage tiebreakers

6 September 2022 1	Borussia Dortmund (Germany)	3–0	(Denmark) Copenhagen	Dortmund, Germany
18:45 CEST (UTC+2)	Reus 35'; Guerreiro 42'; Bellingham 83'	Report	Khocholava (yellow card) 27'; Lerager (yellow card) 61'	Stadium: Westfalenstadion; Attendance: 70,700; Referee: François Letexier (France)

14 September 2022 2	Manchester City (England)	2–1	(Germany) Borussia Dortmund	Manchester, England
21:00 BST (UTC+1)	Rodri (yellow card) 53'; Stones 80'; Haaland 84'; Foden (yellow card) 90+4'	Report	Bellingham 56'; Malen (yellow card) 79'; Özcan (yellow card) 88'; Meunier (yellow card) 90+4'	Stadium: City of Manchester Stadium; Attendance: 50,441; Referee: Daniele Orsato (Italy)

5 October 2022 3	Sevilla (Spain)	1–4	(Germany) Borussia Dortmund	Seville, Spain
21:00 CEST (UTC+2)	Gudelj (yellow card) 3'; En-Nesyri 51'; Lamela (yellow card) 68'; Salas (yellow card) 90+1'	Report	Guerreiro 6'; Bellingham 41'; Adeyemi 43'; Özcan (yellow card) 69'; Brandt 75'	Stadium: Ramón Sánchez Pizjuán; Attendance: 34,598; Referee: Maurizio Mariani (Italy)

11 October 2022 4	Borussia Dortmund (Germany)	1–1	(Spain) Sevilla	Dortmund, Germany
21:00 CEST (UTC+2)	Bellingham 35'; Özcan (yellow card) 90'	Report	Nianzou 18'; Gudelj (yellow card) 84'; Carmona (yellow card) 90'; Bounou (yellow card) 90+4'	Stadium: Westfalenstadion; Attendance: 81,000; Referee: Srđan Jovanović (Serbia)

25 October 2022 5	Borussia Dortmund (Germany)	0–0	(England) Manchester City	Dortmund, Germany
21:00 CEST (UTC+2)	Hummels (yellow card) 87'	Report	Cancelo (yellow card) 7'; Álvarez (yellow card) 31'; Mahrez (penalty missed) 58'; Gündoğan (yellow card) 59'; Akanji (yellow card) 72'	Stadium: Westfalenstadion; Attendance: 81,000; Referee: Davide Massa (Italy)

2 November 2022 6	Copenhagen (Denmark)	1–1	(Germany) Borussia Dortmund	Copenhagen, Denmark
21:00 CET (UTC+1)	Haraldsson 41'; Vavro (yellow card) 47'; Lerager (yellow card) 66'	Report	Hazard 23'; Modeste (yellow card) 45+2'; Can (yellow card) 84'	Stadium: Parken Stadium; Attendance: 31,900; Referee: Aliyar Aghayev (Azerbaijan)

==== Knockout phase ====
===== Round of 16 =====
15 February 2023 First leg	Borussia Dortmund (Germany)	1–0	(England) Chelsea	Dortmund, Germany
21:00 CET (UTC+1)	Bellingham (yellow card) 49'; Can (yellow card) 53'; Adeyemi 63', (yellow card) 77'; Özcan (yellow card) 85'; Ryerson (yellow card) 90'; Süle (yellow card) 90'	Report	James (yellow card) 9'; Thiago Silva (yellow card) 16'; Ziyech (yellow card) 72'; Mount (yellow card) 90'	Stadium: Westfalenstadion; Attendance: 81,365; Referee: Jesús Gil Manzano (Spain)

7 March 2023 Second leg	Chelsea (England)	2–0 (2–1 agg.)	(Germany) Borussia Dortmund	London, England
20:10 GMT (UTC+0)	Sterling 43'; Havertz 53' (pen.); Arrizabalaga (yellow card) 65'; Fernández (yellow card) 77'; Chilwell (yellow card) 90+2'; Cucurella (yellow card) 90+6'	Report	Süle (yellow card) 41'; Wolf (yellow card) 90+2'; Bellingham (yellow card) 90+8'	Stadium: Stamford Bridge; Attendance: 38,882; Referee: Danny Makkelie (Netherlands)
Note: The match was originally scheduled to kick-off at 20:00 GMT, but was delayed by ten minutes due to the late arrival of the bus to the stadium carrying Borussia Dortmund's team.

== Statistics ==
=== Appearances and goals ===
No.	Pos	Nat	Player	Total		Bundesliga		DFB-Pokal		Champions League	
No.	Pos	Nat	Player	Apps	Goals	Apps	Goals	Apps	Goals	Apps	Goals
Goalkeepers
1	GK	(Switzerland) SUI	Gregor Kobel	35	0	27	0	4	0	4	0
33	GK	(Germany) GER	Alexander Meyer	12	0	7	0	0	0	4+1	0
35	GK	(Poland) POL	Marcel Lotka	0	0	0	0	0	0	0	0
38	GK	(Germany) GER	Luca Unbehaun	0	0	0	0	0	0	0	0
Defenders
2	DF	(Spain) ESP	Mateu Morey	0	0	0	0	0	0	0	0
4	DF	(Germany) GER	Nico Schlotterbeck	39	4	27+1	4	2+1	0	6+2	0
13	DF	(Portugal) POR	Raphaël Guerreiro	36	6	26+1	4	3	0	5+1	2
14	DF	(Germany) GER	Nico Schulz	0	0	0	0	0	0	0	0
15	DF	(Germany) GER	Mats Hummels	38	1	24+6	1	2+2	0	4	0
24	DF	(Belgium) BEL	Thomas Meunier	16	0	7+3	0	2	0	4	0
25	DF	(Germany) GER	Niklas Süle	41	2	23+6	2	4	0	7+1	0
26	DF	(Norway) NOR	Julian Ryerson	20	1	17	1	2	0	0+1	0
30	DF	(Germany) GER	Felix Passlack	5	0	0+3	0	0+1	0	1	0
36	DF	(Germany) GER	Tom Rothe	5	0	0+2	0	0	0	1+2	0
44	DF	(France) FRA	Soumaila Coulibaly	2	0	0+1	0	0	0	0+1	0
Midfielders
6	MF	(Turkey) TUR	Salih Özcan	36	0	17+9	0	3	0	7	0
7	MF	(United States) USA	Giovanni Reyna	30	7	4+18	7	0+2	0	3+3	0
8	MF	(Germany) GER	Mahmoud Dahoud	10	0	4+5	0	1	0	0	0
17	MF	(Germany) GER	Marius Wolf	32	1	17+8	1	2+1	0	2+2	0
19	MF	(Germany) GER	Julian Brandt	42	10	29+3	9	3	0	6+1	1
22	MF	(England) ENG	Jude Bellingham	42	14	30+1	8	2+2	2	7	4
23	MF	(Germany) GER	Emre Can	38	3	20+7	2	3+1	1	6+1	0
32	MF	(Guinea) GUI	Abdoulaye Kamara	0	0	0	0	0	0	0	0
42	MF	(Turkey) TUR	Göktan Gürpüz	0	0	0	0	0	0	0	0
47	MF	(Germany) GER	Antonios Papadopoulos	3	0	0+1	0	0	0	0+2	0
Forwards
9	FW	(Ivory Coast) CIV	Sébastien Haller	22	9	15+4	9	1	0	2	0
11	FW	(Germany) GER	Marco Reus	31	8	14+11	6	2+1	1	3	1
16	FW	(Belgium) BEL	Julien Duranville	1	0	0+1	0	0	0	0	0
18	FW	(Germany) GER	Youssoufa Moukoko	35	7	11+15	7	2+1	0	2+4	0
20	FW	(France) FRA	Anthony Modeste	28	2	7+12	2	0+2	0	4+3	0
21	FW	(Netherlands) NED	Donyell Malen	35	10	22+4	9	3	1	2+4	0
27	FW	(Germany) GER	Karim Adeyemi	32	9	20+4	6	1+1	1	5+1	2
43	FW	(England) ENG	Jamie Bynoe-Gittens	20	3	4+11	3	1+2	0	0+2	0
46	FW	(Croatia) CRO	Marco Pašalić	1	0	0+1	0	0	0	0	0
49	FW	(Germany) GER	Justin Njinmah	1	0	0+1	0	0	0	0	0
Players transferred out during the season
10	MF	(Belgium) BEL	Thorgan Hazard	21	1	2+12	0	1+1	0	3+2	1

Source: Competitions

=== Goalscorers ===
Rank	Pos.	No.	Nat.	Player	Bundesliga	DFB-Pokal	Champions League	Total
1	MF	22	(England)	Jude Bellingham	8	2	4	14
2	MF	19	(Germany)	Julian Brandt	9	0	1	10
2	FW	21	(Netherlands)	Donyell Malen	9	1	0	10
4	FW	9	(Ivory Coast)	Sébastien Haller	9	0	0	9
4	FW	27	(Germany)	Karim Adeyemi	6	1	2	9
6	FW	11	(Germany)	Marco Reus	6	1	1	8
7	FW	18	(Germany)	Youssoufa Moukoko	7	0	0	7
7	MF	7	(United States)	Giovanni Reyna	7	0	0	7
9	DF	13	(Portugal)	Raphaël Guerreiro	4	0	2	6
10	DF	4	(Germany)	Nico Schlotterbeck	4	0	0	4
11	MF	23	(Germany)	Emre Can	2	1	0	3
11	FW	43	(England)	Jamie Bynoe-Gittens	3	0	0	3
13	FW	20	(France)	Anthony Modeste	2	0	0	2
13	DF	25	(Germany)	Niklas Süle	2	0	0	2
15	MF	10	(Belgium)	Thorgan Hazard	0	0	1	1
15	DF	15	(Germany)	Mats Hummels	1	0	0	1
15	MF	17	(Germany)	Marius Wolf	1	0	0	1
15	DF	26	(Norway)	Julian Ryerson	1	0	0	1
Own goals					2	1	0	3
Totals					83	7	11	101

=== Assists ===
Rank	Pos.	No.	Nat.	Player	Bundesliga	DFB-Pokal	Champions League	Total
1	DF	13	(Portugal)	Raphaël Guerreiro	12	1	1	14
2	MF	19	(Germany)	Julian Brandt	8	0	1	9
3	FW	11	(Germany)	Marco Reus	4	1	1	6
3	MF	22	(England)	Jude Bellingham	4	1	1	6
3	FW	21	(Netherlands)	Donyell Malen	5	1	0	6
6	DF	4	(Germany)	Nico Schlotterbeck	5	0	0	5
6	FW	27	(Germany)	Karim Adeyemi	5	0	0	5
8	MF	7	(United States)	Giovanni Reyna	2	0	2	4
8	FW	18	(Germany)	Youssoufa Moukoko	3	0	1	4
10	FW	9	(Ivory Coast)	Sébastien Haller	3	0	0	3
10	DF	25	(Germany)	Niklas Süle	3	0	0	3
12	MF	6	(Turkey)	Salih Özcan	1	0	1	2
13	MF	17	(Germany)	Marius Wolf	1	0	0	1
13	FW	20	(France)	Anthony Modeste	1	0	0	1
13	MF	23	(Germany)	Emre Can	1	0	0	1
13	DF	24	(Belgium)	Thomas Meunier	0	0	1	1
13	FW	43	(England)	Jamie Bynoe-Gittens	1	0	0	1
Totals					57	4	9	70
