= Kostakis =

Kostakis (Greek: Κωστάκης) is a given name and surname. Notable people bearing it include:

- Charis Kostakis (born 1990), Greek professional footballer
- Kostakis Artymatas (born 1993), Cypriot professional footballer
- Kostakis Konstantinou (born 1968), Cypriot professional footballer
- Kostakis Pierides (born 1940), Cypriot professional footballer
- Nikos Kostakis (born 1973), Greek professional footballer
- Will Kostakis (born 1989), Australian author and journalist
- George Costakis (1913–1990), collector of Russian avant-garde art

== See also ==
- Anastasia Kostaki
