= Nico Schlotterbeck =

German footballer (born 1999)

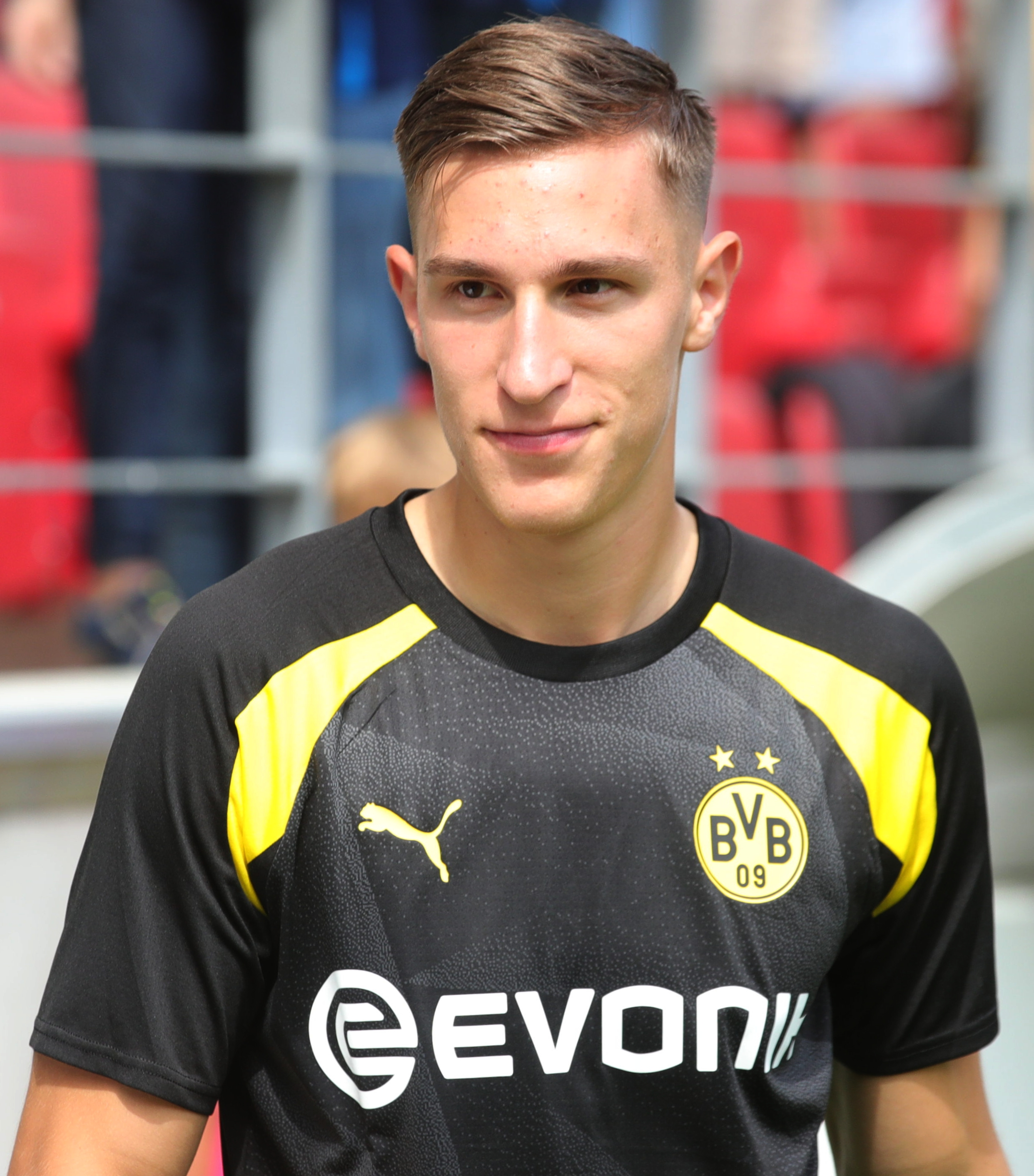
- Schlotterbeck with Borussia Dortmund in 2023

Personal information
- Full name: Nico Cédric Schlotterbeck
- Date of birth: 1 December 1999 (age 26)
- Place of birth: Waiblingen, Germany
- Height: 1.91 m (6 ft 3 in)
- Position: Centre-back

Team information
- Current team: Borussia Dortmund
- Number: 4

Youth career
- –2007: SG Weinstadt
- 2007–2014: Stuttgarter Kickers
- 2014–2015: VfR Aalen
- 2015–2017: Karlsruher SC
- 2017–2018: SC Freiburg

Senior career*
Years	Team	Apps	(Gls)
2018–2020	SC Freiburg II	25	(2)
2019–2022	SC Freiburg	49	(4)
2020–2021	→ Union Berlin (loan)	16	(1)
2022–	Borussia Dortmund	118	(12)

International career^{‡}
2017	Germany U18	1	(0)
2017–2018	Germany U19	2	(0)
2018	Germany U20	3	(0)
2019–2021	Germany U21	13	(3)
2022–	Germany	31	(2)
Medal record
Representing Germany
UEFA European Under-21 Championship
Winner	2021 Hungary–Slovenia
- * Club domestic league appearances and goals as of 31 October 2026 ‡ National team caps and goals as of 21:40, 16 November 2026 (UTC)

Nico Cédric Schlotterbeck (German pronunciation: [ˈniːko ˈʃlɔtɐˌbɛk]; born 1 December 1999) is a German professional footballer who plays primarily as a centre-back for Bundesliga club Borussia Dortmund and the Germany national team. He is known for his build-up play (sharp vertical flat passes), aerial ability, speed, strength and aggressive tackling.

== Club career ==
=== Early career ===
Schlotterbeck began his club career together with his older brother Keven in his home district Rems-Murr at SG Weinstadt. Both his father and uncle Niels Schlotterbeck used to play football themselves, although the former had to end his career early at the age of 19 due to illness. During trial training sessions, the brothers Nico and Keven, who grew up in the district Beutelsbach in Weinstadt, were accepted into the academy of Stuttgart Kickers. Their friend Antonios Papadopoulos, also born in 1999, was accepted along with them. Papadopoulos and Schlotterbeck played together in Stuttgart until the Under-15s and also faced teams such as Ajax Amsterdam and Juventus FC in junior tournaments. After a year at VfR Aalen, which uncle Niels Schlotterbeck described as a ‘step backwards’, things started looking up again for the youngster in 2015 when he was accepted into the Under-17s team of Karlsruher SC. Under the coach Lukas Kwasniok Schlotterbeck played as centre-back in that team and was together with Tim Kircher for example part of the defense unit which would later go on to play professionally at the KSC. As part of the Under-17s Schlotterbeck finished in the upper half of the league standings and scored two goals. Due to his rough playing style he was at risk for being suspended for too many yellow cards a second time after already receiving a first suspension during that season. At only 16 years old he was then called up into the Under-19 squad of the Karlsruher SC where he started, like in the previous Under-17s, as a regular. His first season in the Under-19 team was simultaneously his last at Karlsruhe. During that year he sometimes played midfield but overall he remained a steady part of the teams defense. Although playing as centre-back he still managed to score 7 goals, three of which were headers and provide one assist.

=== SC Freiburg ===
==== Professional debut ====
Together with his brother Keven, Schlotterbeck joined the Bundesliga side coached by Christian Streich in the summer of 2018. Both took part in the pre-season training and continued to train regularly with the first team afterwards. Schlotterbeck debuted for SC Freiburg on 9 March 2019, coming on as a half-time substitute for Philipp Lienhart in the 2–1 home win against Hertha BSC. The two brothers started as central defenders on matchday 29 in a 2–1 away defeat in Bremen, playing the full match alongside Dominique Heintz. They also played together frequently in the Regionalliga Südwest, where Nico scored two goals. While Keven spent the 2019−20 season on loan at newly promoted Union Berlin, Streich focused on further integrating Nico into the first-team squad. Nico played the full 90 minutes in each of the first three league matches. In the 3–0 victory over Mainz 05, he was rated by kicker as Freiburg’s second-best player in terms of average match ratings, behind goalkeeper Alexander Schwolow and alongside Luca Waldschmidt and Lucas Höler. After a bad performance in Freiburg’s 2–1 loss against 1.FC Köln on matchday 3 he was relegated to being a substitute in the following games. For the remainder of the season, he only started one more game and was substituted on a few times, while also playing for the second team in the fourth division. Nevertheless, he received a call-up for Germany’s under-21’s.

In his final match for Freiburg in 2022, the club lost the DFB-Pokal Final on penalties but Schlotterbeck was awarded the man of the match.

==== Loan to Union Berlin ====
With his brother Keven returning from loan at Union Berlin, they were in need of a new centre-back. They agreed a deal with Freiburg for a loan of Nico Schlotterbeck for the 2020–2021 season. He lived in Köpenick, in close proximity to his new club’s environment and started three of first four games of the season before being sidelined by a thigh injury until the second half of the season. Upon his return he proved to be a reliable centre-back, pushing Florian Hübner to the bench. On matchday 22, he triumphed after a 1–0 win over his main club SC Freiburg where his brother Keven still played. Nico had previously missed the first leg due to an injury. At the end of the season, Union Berlin ranked fourth in fewest goals conceded (champions FC Bayern München were fifth). As seventh in the table they earned the right to participate in the qualifiers for the newly introduced UEFA Europa Conference League, thanks to the victory of runners-up Borussia Dortmund in the DFB-Pokal. Schlotterbeck was voted into the German soccer rankings for the first time at the end of the season, where he finished 18th in the national class. That placed him ahead of Bielefeld's Amos Pieper and behind Hertha BSC's Niklas Stark.

=== Borussia Dortmund ===
On 2 May 2022, Borussia Dortmund announced the signing of Schlotterbeck on a five-year deal, starting from the 2022–23 season. He joined for a reported €25 million transfer fee. He would almost win the league with Dortmund in his first season, but merely became runners-up due to goal difference. In the 2023–24 season, he achieved the highest tackling success rate in the Bundesliga at 71%, in addition to winning possession over 240 times, he also played a crucial role in his club's qualification to the Champions League final alongside fellow centre-back Mats Hummels.

In the 2024–25 season, he earned a place in the Bundesliga Team of the Season, even though he suffered an injury toward the end of the campaign, which also caused him to miss the 2025 FIFA Club World Cup. On 10 April 2026, he extended his contract with the club until 2031.

== International career ==
Schlotterbeck got his debut call-up to the Germany national team under coach Hansi Flick for FIFA World Cup qualification in September 2021. He made his debut against Israel in a friendly on 27 March 2022. Later that year, on 10 November, he was named in the 26-man squad for the 2022 FIFA World Cup in Qatar.

Schlotterbeck was named in Germany's squad for UEFA Euro 2024.

On 21 May 2026, he was selected in Germany's 26-man squad for the 2026 FIFA World Cup. On 14 June 2026, he scored his first international goal in Germany's opening game of the tournament, a 7–1 win over Curaçao, with a header in the 38th minute. He sustained an ankle injury during the second group match against Ivory Coast, ruling him out for the remainder of the tournament.

== Personal life ==
Schlotterbeck is the nephew of former professional footballer Niels Schlotterbeck, who played for Freiburg. His older brother, Keven, is a professional footballer who plays for English side Southampton. Schlotterbeck's cousin, Sandrine, appeared on the seventh series of the German edition of Love Island in 2022.

== Career statistics ==
=== Club ===
As of match played 31 October 2026

Appearances and goals by club, season and competition
Club	Season	League			DFB-Pokal		Europe		Total	
Club	Season	Division	Apps	Goals	Apps	Goals	Apps	Goals	Apps	Goals
SC Freiburg II	2018–19	Regionalliga Südwest	24	2	—		—		24	2
SC Freiburg II	2019–20	Regionalliga Südwest	1	0	—		—		1	0
SC Freiburg II	Total		25	2	—		—		25	2
SC Freiburg	2018–19	Bundesliga	4	0	0	0	—		4	0
SC Freiburg	2019–20	Bundesliga	13	0	1	0	—		14	0
SC Freiburg	2021–22	Bundesliga	32	4	6	0	—		38	4
SC Freiburg	Total		49	4	7	0	—		56	4
Union Berlin (loan)	2020–21	Bundesliga	16	1	1	1	—		17	2
Borussia Dortmund	2022–23	Bundesliga	28	4	3	0	8 (Note: Appearances in UEFA Champions League)	0	39	4
Borussia Dortmund	2023–24	Bundesliga	33	2	3	0	12	0	48	2
Borussia Dortmund	2024–25	Bundesliga	23	0	2	0	12	0	37	0
Borussia Dortmund	2025–26	Bundesliga	28	5	2	0	7	0	37	5
Borussia Dortmund	2026–27	Bundesliga	6	1	1	0	1	0	8	1
Borussia Dortmund	Total		118	12	11	0	40	0	169	12
Career total			208	19	19	1	40	0	267	20

=== International ===
As of match played 16 November 2026

Appearances and goals by national team and year
National team	Year	Apps	Goals
Germany	2022	8	0
Germany	2023	3	0
Germany	2024	7	0
Germany	2025	5	0
Germany	2026	8	2
Total		31	2

Germany score listed first, score column indicates score after each Schlotterbeck goal.

List of international goals scored by Nico Schlotterbeck
No.	Date	Venue	Cap	Opponent	Score	Result	Competition
1	14 June 2026	NRG Stadium, Houston, United States	28	Curaçao	2–1	7–1	2026 FIFA World Cup
2	16 November 2026	Olympiastadion, Berlin, Germany	31	Netherlands	3–0	5–0	2026–27 UEFA Nations League A

== Honours ==
SC Freiburg

- DFB-Pokal runner-up: 2021–22

Borussia Dortmund

- UEFA Champions League runner-up: 2023–24

Germany U21

- UEFA European Under-21 Championship: 2021

Individual

- UEFA European Under-21 Championship Team of the Tournament: 2021
- Bundesliga Team of the Season: 2021–22, 2022–23, 2024–25, 2025–26
- kicker Bundesliga Team of the Season: 2021–22, 2025–26
- Bundesliga Player of the Month: March 2025
- VDV Bundesliga Team of the Season: 2024–25, 2025–26
