= Papadopoulos =

Papadopoulos (Greek: Παπαδόπουλος, IPA: [papaˈðopulos]; meaning "son of a priest" or "son of a pope") is the most common Greek surname. It is used in Greece, Cyprus and countries of the Greek diaspora as well, such as the United States, United Kingdom, Australia and Scandinavian countries. Over 150000 people in total bear the surname. In 1st place, it's the most common surname in Greece. Its female version corresponds to the masculine genitive Papadopoulou (Παπαδοπούλου [papaðoˈpulu]).

== Men ==
- Antonios Papadopoulos (born 1999), German footballer of Greek descent
- Avraam Papadopoulos (born 1984), Greek footballer
- Daniil Papadopoulos (born 1963), Greek footballer
- Dimitrios Papadopoulos (1950–2020), Greek footballer
- Dimitrios Papadopoulos (born 1981), Greek footballer
- Dimitris Papadopoulos (basketball player) (born 1966), Greek basketball player
- Dimitrios Papadopoulos (general) (1889–1983), Greek general in World War II
- Efthimios Papadopoulos (born 1983), Greek runner
- Evgenios Papadopoulos, Greek sprinter
- Georgios Papadopoulos (1919–1999), Greek military officer and dictator in 1967–1973
- George Papadopoulos (born 1987), former policy adviser for the Donald Trump presidential campaign, 2016
- Giannis Papadopoulos (footballer, born 1989), Greek footballer
- Giannis Papadopoulos (footballer, born 1998), Greek footballer
- Giorgos Papadopoulos (footballer, born 1991), Cypriot footballer
- Giorgos Papadopoulos (singer) (born 1985), Cypriot singer
- Giuseppe Papadopulo (born 1948), Italian football manager
- Greg Papadopoulos (born 1958), American engineer, computer scientist, executive, and venture capitalist, former CTO of Sun Microsystems
- Ioannis Papadopoulos (chess player) (born 1988), Greek chess player
- Kyriakos Papadopoulos (born 1992), Greek footballer
- Lazaros Papadopoulos (born 1980), Greek basketball player
- Lefteris Papadopoulos (born 1935), Greek lyricist and journalist
- Manolis Papadopoulos (1968–2025), Greek football player and manager
- Michal Papadopulos (born 1985), Czech footballer of Greek descent
- Nikolaos Papadopoulos, several people of that name
- Panagiotis Papadopoulos, Greek wrestler
- Panos Papadopulos (1920–2001), German actor of Pontic Greek origin
- Panos Papadopoulos (born 1958), Greek-Swedish designer and entrepreneur
- Stephanos Papadopoulos (born 1976), Greek-American poet and translator
- Tassos Papadopoulos (1934–2008), 5th President of Cyprus in 2003–2008
- Theologis Papadopoulos (born 1960), Greek footballer
- Vitali Papadopulo (born 1963), Russian footballer and manager
- Yiannis Papadopoulos (guitarist) (born 1984), Greek guitarist

== Women ==
- Irena Papadopoulos, Greek Cypriot academic
- Klavdia Papadopoulou (born 2002), Greek singer
- Kyriaki Papadopoulou (1938–2026), known as Marinella, Greek singer
- Stiliani Papadopoulou (born 1982), Greek hammer thrower
- Linda Papadopoulos (born 1971), British-Canadian psychologist and media commentator

== In fiction ==
- Algernon Papadopoulos, a character in the video game Bully
- Aristotle Papadopoulos, the main antagonist of the film The Hitman's Wife's Bodyguard.
- Lester Papadopoulos, Apollo's human name in The Trials of Apollo by Rick Riordan

== See also ==
- Papadopol, the Romanian derivative and equivalent surname
- Papadopoulos (biscuits), a Greek food company
- Papadopoulos & Sons, a 2012 film directed by Marcus Markou
- Papadopoli (disambiguation)
