= Nikolaos Papadopoulos =

Nikos, Nikolaos or Nikolas Papadopoulos may refer to:

- Niccolò Comneno Papadopoli (1655–1740), Cretan-Italian lawyer and historian
- Nikolaos Papadopoulos (1769-1820), scholar and trader from Epirus
- Nikolaos Papadopoulos (fighter), fighter in the Greek War of Independence
- Niccolò Papadopoli (Nicolo Papadopoli Aldobrandini, 1841–1922), Italian politician from Venice
- Nikolaos Papadopoulos (scholar) (1933–2012), Greek Old Testament scholar
- Nikos Papadopoulos (Swedish politician) (born 1939)
- Nikos Papadopoulos (actor) (b. 1962)
- Nikos Papadopoulos (footballer, born 1971)
- Nikos Papadopoulos (footballer, born 1990)
- Nikolas Papadopoulos (born 1973), Cypriot lawyer and politician
- Nikos Papadopoulos (Greek politician), member of the Hellenic Parliament, June 2023

== See also ==
- Papadopoulos
- Papadopoli (disambiguation)
- Nikos Pappas (disambiguation)
