= Nikoś =

Nikoś is a Polish masculine given name, a dininutive of Nikodem. Notable bearers of the name include:

- Nikodem Skotarczak ("Nikoś"), Polish mafioso
- Nikoś Dyzma, protagonist of the 2002 Polish film Career of Nikos Dyzma

== See also ==
- Nikos
