= Salih Özcan =

Footballer (born 1998)

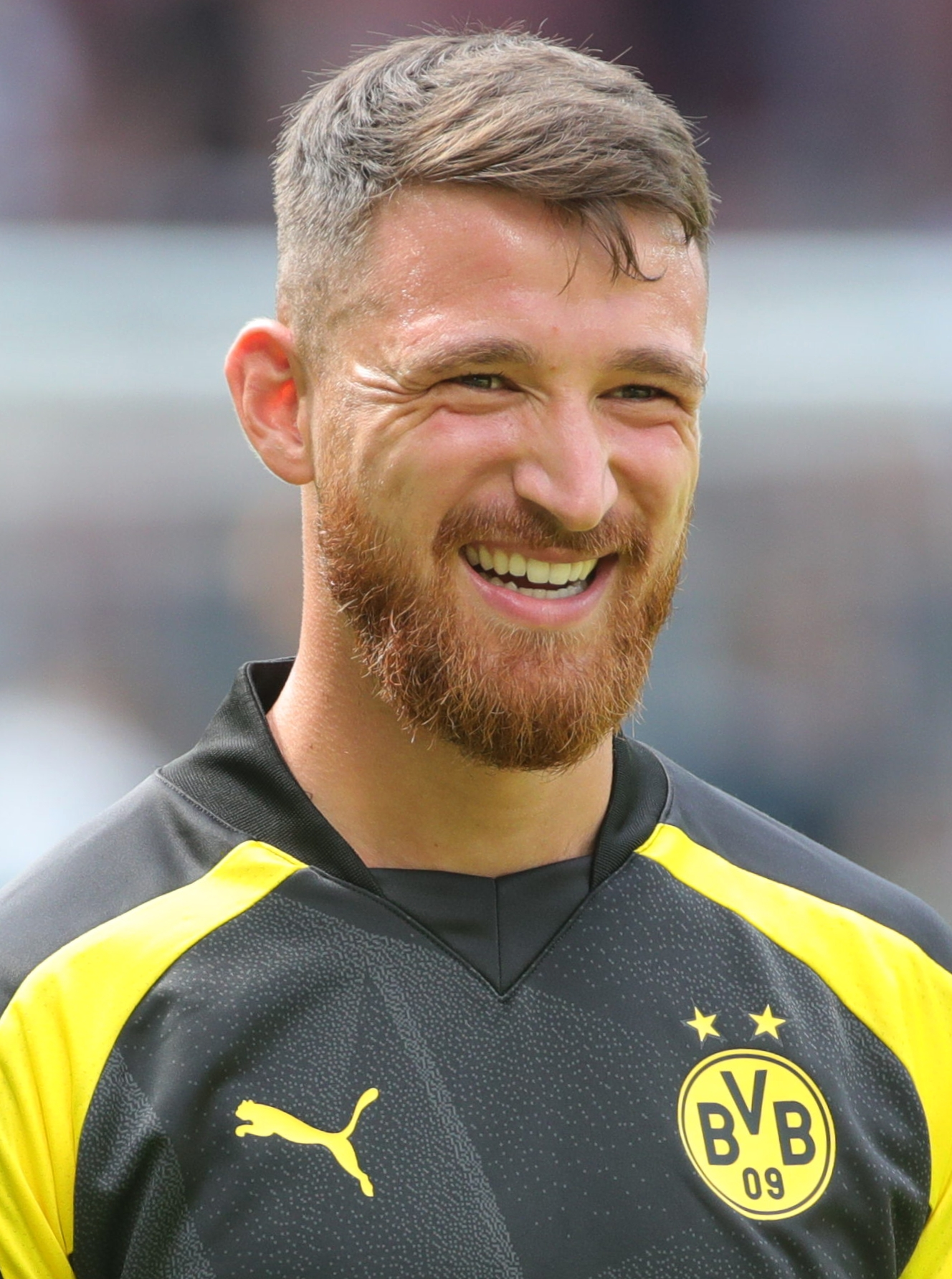
- Özcan with Borussia Dortmund in 2023

Personal information
- Full name: Salih Özcan
- Date of birth: 11 January 1998 (age 28)
- Place of birth: Cologne, Germany
- Height: 1.82 m (6 ft 0 in)
- Position: Defensive midfielder

Team information
- Current team: Beşiktaş
- Number: 6

Youth career
- –2007: SC West Köln
- 2007–2016: 1. Köln

Senior career*
Years	Team	Apps	(Gls)
2016–2019	1. Köln II	22	(4)
2016–2022	1. Köln	110	(3)
2019–2020	→ Holstein Kiel (loan)	28	(5)
2022–2026	Borussia Dortmund	71	(0)
2024–2025	→ VfL Wolfsburg (loan)	11	(0)
2026–	Beşiktaş	12	(0)

International career^{‡}
2012–2013	Germany U15	7	(0)
2013–2014	Germany U16	6	(2)
2014–2015	Germany U17	16	(0)
2016	Germany U18	1	(0)
2016–2017	Germany U19	8	(1)
2017	Germany U20	1	(0)
2019–2021	Germany U21	15	(1)
2022–	Turkey	38	(1)
Medal record
Men's football
Representing Germany
UEFA European Under-21 Championship
Winner	2021 Hungary and Slovenia
UEFA European Under-17 Championship
Runner-up	2015 Bulgaria
- * Club domestic league appearances and goals as of 22 November 2026 (UTC) ‡ National team caps and goals as of 15 November 2026 (UTC)

Salih Özcan (born 11 January 1998) is a professional footballer who plays as a defensive midfielder for the Süper Lig club Beşiktaş. Born in Germany, he plays for the Turkey national team.

== Club career ==
=== Köln ===
Born in Germany, Özcan is of Turkish descent as he was born into a Turkish family. Özcan spent the majority of his youth career in 1. FC Köln's youth system. He first featured in 1. FC Köln's first team in September 2016 in a Bundesliga match against Schalke 04. During the 2017–18 season he consistently started in central midfield. He scored his first league goal on 2 September 2018 in a 2. Bundesliga match against FC St. Pauli.

In 2017, Özcan was awarded the golden Fritz Walter Medal for the best U19 player in Germany.

==== Loan to Holstein Kiel ====
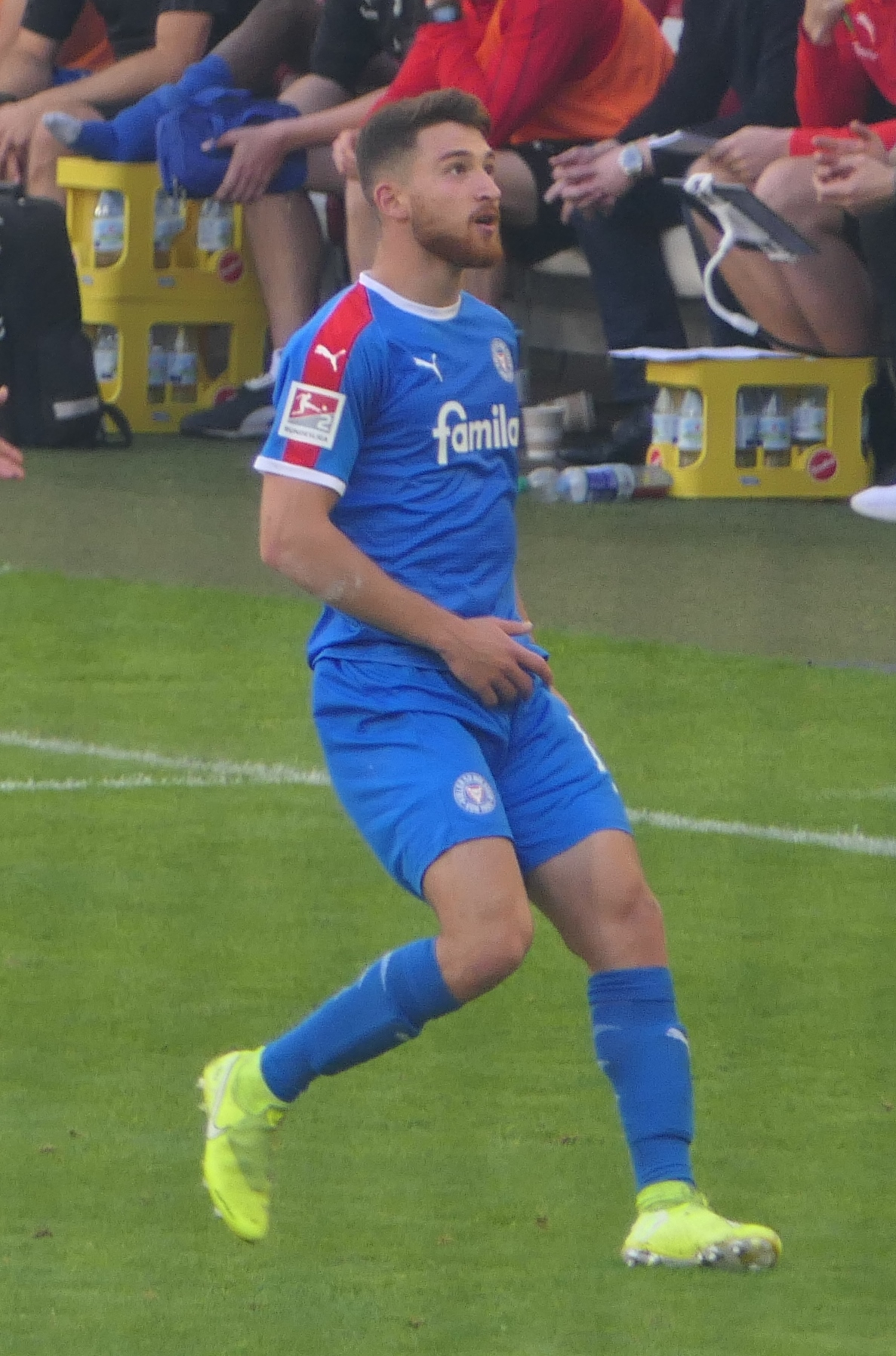
Özcan at Holstein Kiel in 2019

On 23 August 2019, Özcan joined Holstein Kiel on loan until the end of 2019–20 season. Three days later, he made his debut with the team as a starter in a 2. Bundesliga away match against FC St. Pauli, which ended in a 2–1 defeat.

==== Return to Köln ====
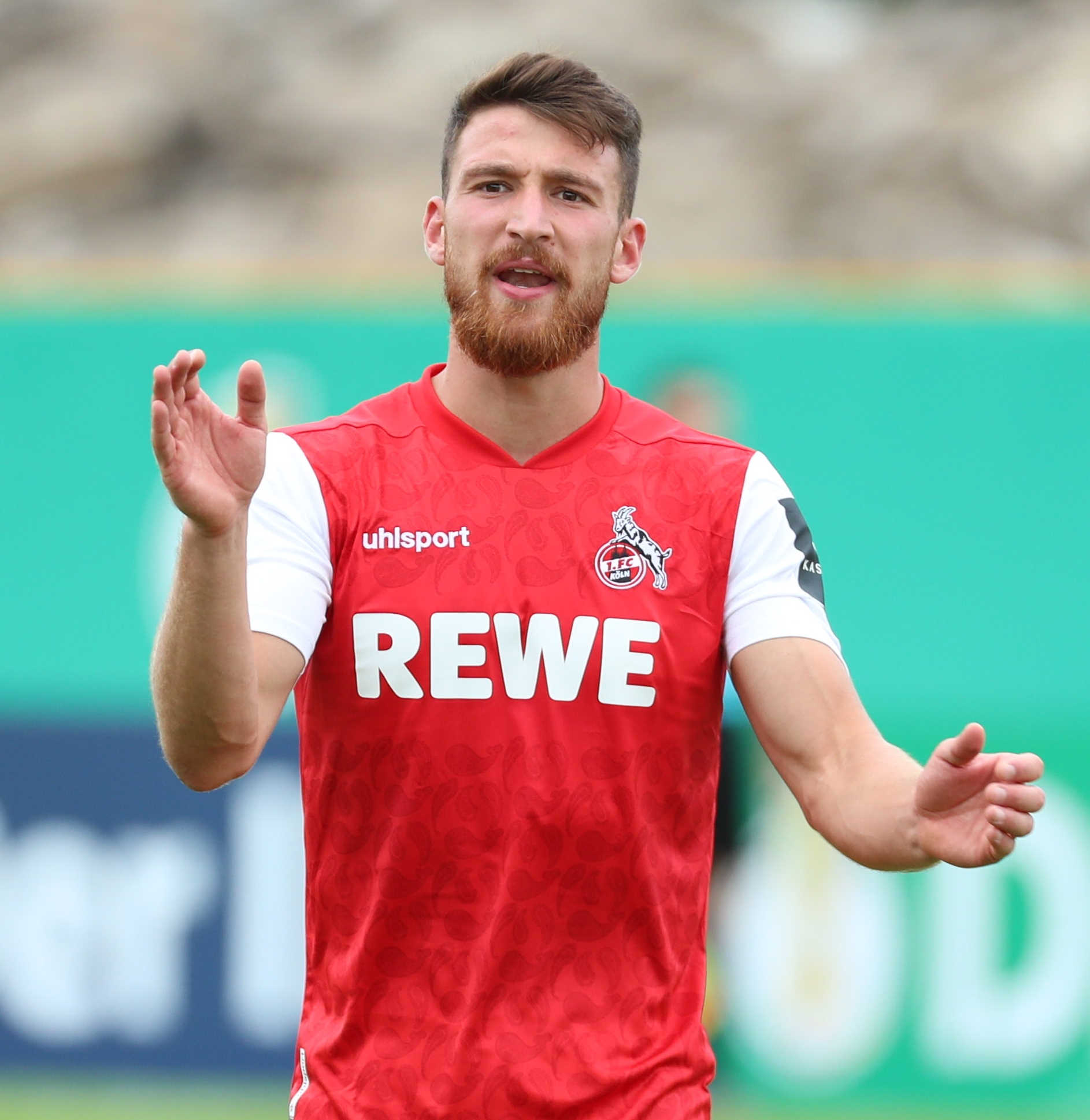
Özcan playing for 1. FC Köln in 2021

On 29 June 2021, in spite of speculations about a possible transfer, the club announced that Özcan had signed a new two-year contract with Köln.

=== Borussia Dortmund ===
On 23 May 2022, it was reported that Özcan would join Borussia Dortmund for the 2022–23 season and that he would sign a contract with the club until 2026. The German sports magazine kicker estimated the transfer fee to be €5 million.

On 27 August 2022, he made his debut with the team as a starter in a Bundesliga match against Hertha BSC. On 6 September 2022, he made his continental debut with the team in a UEFA Champions League match against København.

==== Loan to Wolfsburg ====
On 28 August 2024, Özcan moved on loan to VfL Wolfsburg. Three days later, he made his debut with Wolfsburg in a 2–0 away win against his former club Holstein Kiel.

==== Return to Borussia Dortmund ====
In late January 2025, Özcan was recalled to Borussia Dortmund following the long-term injury of Felix Nmecha. In March 2026, the club announced that his contract, which was due to expire at the end of the season, would not be renewed. He left the club at the end of the 2025–26 season, with his final game being on May 8 in a 3–2 win over Eintracht Frankfurt where he came off the bench in the 78th minute for Marcel Sabitzer.

=== Beşiktaş ===
On 9 July 2026, Özcan joined the Süper Lig club Beşiktaş on a permanent three-year deal with an option for another year.

== International career ==
Özcan was eligible for both the Turkish and German national teams, and played for Germany's youth teams. He played his last game for Germany U21 on 6 June 2021, starting in the UEFA European Under-21 Championship final.

On 25 March 2022, Özcan was called up to the Turkey national team by head coach Stefan Kuntz. He debuted in a friendly 3–2 loss to Italy on 29 March 2022.

On 7 June 2024, he was named in the final squad of 26 players selected by Vincenzo Montella to take part in UEFA Euro 2024. On 18 November 2025, he scored his first national goal against Spain in the 2026 FIFA World Cup qualification.

On 2 June 2026, Özcan was selected in the 26-man squad for the 2026 FIFA World Cup.

== Career statistics ==
=== Club ===
As of match played 20 September 2026

Appearances and goals by club, season and competition
Club	Season	League			National cup (Note: Includes DFB-Pokal)		Europe		Other		Total	
Club	Season	Division	Apps	Goals	Apps	Goals	Apps	Goals	Apps	Goals	Apps	Goals
1. FC Köln II	2015–16	Regionalliga West	16	3	—		—		—		16	3
1. FC Köln II	2016–17	Regionalliga West	2	0	—		—		—		2	0
1. FC Köln II	2017–18	Regionalliga West	2	0	—		—		—		2	0
1. FC Köln II	2019–20	Regionalliga West	2	1	—		—		—		2	1
1. FC Köln II	Total		22	4	—		—		—		22	4
1. FC Köln	2016–17	Bundesliga	13	0	2	0	—		—		15	0
1. FC Köln	2017–18	Bundesliga	23	0	2	0	5 (Note: Appearances in UEFA Europa League)	0	—		30	0
1. FC Köln	2018–19	2. Bundesliga	15	1	2	0	—		—		17	1
1. FC Köln	2020–21	Bundesliga	28	0	3	1	—		1 (Note: Appearance in Bundesliga relegation play-offs)	0	32	1
1. FC Köln	2021–22	Bundesliga	31	2	3	0	—		—		34	2
1. FC Köln	Total		110	3	12	1	5	0	1	0	128	4
Holstein Kiel (loan)	2019–20	2. Bundesliga	28	5	1	0	—		—		29	5
Borussia Dortmund	2022–23	Bundesliga	26	0	3	0	7 (Note: Appearances in UEFA Champions League)	0	—		36	0
Borussia Dortmund	2023–24	Bundesliga	23	0	2	0	9	0	—		34	0
Borussia Dortmund	2024–25	Bundesliga	11	0	—		3	0	—		14	0
Borussia Dortmund	2025–26	Bundesliga	11	0	1	0	0	0	—		12	0
Borussia Dortmund	Total		71	0	6	0	19	0	—		96	0
VfL Wolfsburg (loan)	2024–25	Bundesliga	11	0	1	0	—		—		12	0
Beşiktaş	2026–27	Süper Lig	6	0	0	0	7	0	—		13	0
Career total			248	12	20	1	31	0	1	0	300	13

=== International ===
As of match played 15 November 2026

Appearances and goals by national team and year
National team	Year	Apps	Goals
Turkey	2022	7	0
Turkey	2023	9	0
Turkey	2024	6	0
Turkey	2025	5	1
Turkey	2026	11	0
Total		38	1

Scores and results list Turkey's goal tally first.

List of international goals scored by Salih Özcan
No.	Date	Venue	Cap	Opponent	Score	Result	Competition	Ref.
1	18 November 2025	La Cartuja, Seville, Spain	27	Spain	2–1	2–2	2026 FIFA World Cup qualification	

== Honours ==
1. FC Köln

- 2. Bundesliga: 2018–19

Borussia Dortmund

- UEFA Champions League runner-up: 2023–24

Germany U21

- UEFA European Under-21 Championship: 2021

Individual

- Fritz Walter Medal U19 Gold: 2017
- kicker Bundesliga Team of the Season: 2021–22
