= Nikodým =

Nikodým (feminine: Nikodýmová) is a Czech surname. Nikodym is the Polish language spelling of the surname. They are variants of the given name Nicodemus. Notable people with the surnames include:

- Jaroslav Nikodým (born 1950), Czech judoka
- Otto M. Nikodym (1887–1974), Polish mathematician of Czech descent
- Stanisława Nikodym (1897–1988), Polish mathematician and artist, wife of Otto M. Nikodym

== See also ==
- Nikodem
