= Papadopol =

Papadopol is a Romanian-language surname derived from the Greek Papadopoulos ("son of a priest"). People with the surname include:

- Alexandru Papadopol, actor
- Alexandru Papadopol-Calimah, historian and political figure
