= Nicodème =

Nicodème is a given name of French origin. It corresponds to the name Nicodemus. People with that name include:

- Nicodème Audet (1822–1905), merchant and political figure in Quebec
- Nicodeme Boucher (born 1966), Senegalese football coach and former player
- Nicodème Kabamba (born 1936), Congolese footballer

== See also ==
- Saint-Nicodème, a commune in the Côtes-d'Armor department of Brittany in northwestern France
- See "Nicodemus" for other variants
