= Nicodim =

Nicodim is a Romanian masculine given name. It is a variant of the given name Nicodemus. Notable people with the name include:

- Nicodim Vulpe, bishop of the Moldovan Orthodox Church
- Patriarch Nicodim of Romania

== See also ==
- See "Nicodemus" for other variants
