= Giuseppe Papadopulo =

Footballer and manager (born 1948)

Personal information
- Date of birth: 2 February 1948 (age 78)
- Place of birth: Casale Marittimo, Italy
- Position: Defender

Senior career*
| Years | Team | Apps | (Gls) |
| 1966–1969 | Livorno | 27 | (0) |
| 1969–1972 | Lazio | 69 | (0) |
| 1972–1974 | Brindisi | 71 | (1) |
| 1974–1976 | Arezzo | 57 | (0) |
| 1976–1977 | Salernitana | 34 | (1) |
| 1977–1979 | Bari | 54 | (0) |

Managerial career
- 1987–1988: Sorrento
- 1988–1989: Licata
- 1989–1991: Monopoli
- 1991–1992: Perugia
- 1992–1994: Acireale
- 1994–1995: Avellino
- 1995–1996: Livorno
- 1996–1998: Fidelis Andria
- 1998–1999: Lucchese
- 1999–2000: Cremonese
- 2000–2001: Crotone
- 2001–2004: Siena
- 2004–2005: Lazio
- 2006: Palermo
- 2006–2008: Lecce
- 2009: Bologna
- 2011: Torino
- * Club domestic league appearances and goals

Giuseppe Papadopulo (Greek: Ιώσηπο Παπαδόπουλο; born 2 February 1948) is an Italian football manager and former player who played as a defender. He was last in charge as head coach of Torino.

== Early life and playing career ==
Papadopulo was born in Casale Marittimo, Pisa to Italian parents. His paternal family is of Greek descent. His surname is derived from the most common Greek surname, Papadopoulos (Greek: Παπαδόπουλος, IPA: [papaˈðopulos]; meaning "son of a priest").
Papadopulo began his playing career at Livorno. Then later moved to Lazio, which he helped win the Cup of the Alps in 1971. He later played for Brindisi, Arezzo, Salernitana and Bari.

== Managerial career ==
Papadopulo started his coaching career in 1984 at Cecina, a minor amateur team of Tuscany. Then, after two years as assistant coach for Casertana, he debuted at the professional level in 1987 for Sorrento. In 1989, he coached of Licata, a small Sicilian Serie B team at the time.

After two other coaching experiences for Monopoli and Perugia, Papadopulo in 1993 drove Acireale to a surprising promotion to Serie B. He then coached Avellino, Livorno, and led Fidelis Andria to another Serie B promotion.

But, after two other short times with Lucchese and Crotone, Papadopulo finally had his luckiest success for Siena (2001–2004), leading the team from the relegation zone in Serie B to its first Serie A promotion ever, and even avoiding relegation from the top division the following year. Papadopulo was nicknamed il Papa (The Pope) by Siena fans during his period with the team.

During the 2004–2005 season, Papadopulo was appointed as new coach of Lazio, replacing Domenico Caso; however, he left his managing position at the end of the season. On 29 January 2006, Papadopulo has been called back to Sicily in order to replace Luigi Delneri at the helm of Palermo, and debuted with a surprising 3–0 win against AC Milan for a match of Italian Cup. After a series of impressive results, which led Palermo off the lower places in the standings, and despite a one-year renewal signed before the end of the season, Papadopulo was dismissed from the rosanero, in order to be replaced by Francesco Guidolin.

On 28 December 2006, he became the new manager of Serie B club Lecce. In his second season with the giallorossi, Papadopulo obtained a third place in the Serie B final table, and then managed to defeat Pisa and AlbinoLeffe in the promotion playoffs, thus securing promotion to the top flight. Despite this, he left the club weeks later, after failing to reach an agreement with the club, who eventually decided to appoint Mario Beretta at his place.

On 14 April 2009, he was appointed new head coach of Bologna, after Siniša Mihajlović's dismissal.

On 20 October 2009, Papadopulo was fired as head coach of Bologna replaced by Franco Colomba.

On 9 March 2011, he was named new head coach of Serie B fallen giants Torino in place of Franco Lerda. His tenure at the helm of Torino turned out to last only a mere eleven days, marked with two defeats that convinced club chairman Urbano Cairo to remove Papadopulo from his managerial duties on 20 March and reinstate Lerda in the head coaching position.

== Honours ==
=== Player ===
Lazio

- Cup of the Alps: 1971

=== Manager ===
Siena

- Serie B: 2002–03
