= Nykodym =

Nykodym is a Ukrainian masculine given name. It is a variant of the given name Nicodemus. Notable people withe the name include:

- Nykodym Gorenko (born 1972), bishop of the Ukrainian Orthodox Church (Moscow Patriarchate)
- Nykodym Rusnak, Ukrainian Orthodox metropolitan bishop of Kharkiv and Bohodukhiv

== See also ==
- See "Nicodemus" for other variants
