= Nikodim =

Nikodim is a masculine given name. It is a variant of the given name Nicodemus. Notable people withe the name include:

- Nikodim I (died 1325), Eastern Orthodox saint, 10th Metropolitan of Peć and Archbishop of the Serbs
- Nikodim II, Serbian Patriarch between 1445 and 1455
- Nikodim Busović (1657–1707), Serbian Orthodox bishop of Krka and the head of the Serbian Orthodox Church in Dalmatia under Venetian rule
- Nikodim Kondakov (1844–1925), Russian art historian
- Nikodim (Kononov), (1871–1919) Russian Orthodox bishop
- Nikodim Krotkov (1868–1938), Russian Orthodox Archbishop of Kostroma and Galich
- Nikodim Milaš (1845–1915), Serbian Orthodox bishop, theologian and saint
- Nikodim Rotov (1929–1978), Metropolitan of Leningrad and Minsk and undercover KGB agent
- Nikodim Schlegel (1877–?), Russian politician
- Nikodim Silivanovich (1834–1919), Russian painter and mosaicist
- Nikodim Tsarknias (born 1942), Greek Macedonian Orthodox Christian monk and archimandrite (superior abbot) expelled for misconduct
