= Nicos =

Nicos may refer to:

- Nicos Anastasiades (born 1946), Cypriot politician and leader of the right wing political party DISY
- Nicos Jiapouras (born 1970), Cypriot International footballer
- Nicos Nicolaides, Greek painter and writer
- Nicos Panayiotou (born 1970), former international Cypriot football goalkeeper
- Nicos Poulantzas (1936–1979), Greco-French Marxist political sociologist

== See also ==
- Nico (given name)
- Nikos
