= Nicodemo =

Nicodemo is both a surname and a given name. Notable people with the name include:

- Attilio Nicodemo (born 1974), Italian footballer
- Tony Nicodemo, American basketball player
- Nicodemo Ferrucci (1574–1650), Italian Baroque painter
- Nicodemo Scarfo (1929–2017), American crime boss

== See also ==
- See "Nicodemus" for other variants
