= Nikos Pappas =

Nikos Pappas may refer to:

- Nikos Pappas (basketball) (born 1990), a professional basketball player for Panathinaikos and politician
- Nikos Pappas (politician) (born 1976), former Greek Minister of State

== See also ==
- Nikolaos Pappas (1930–2013), Greek admiral
