= Göktan Gürpüz =

Turkish footballer (born 2003)

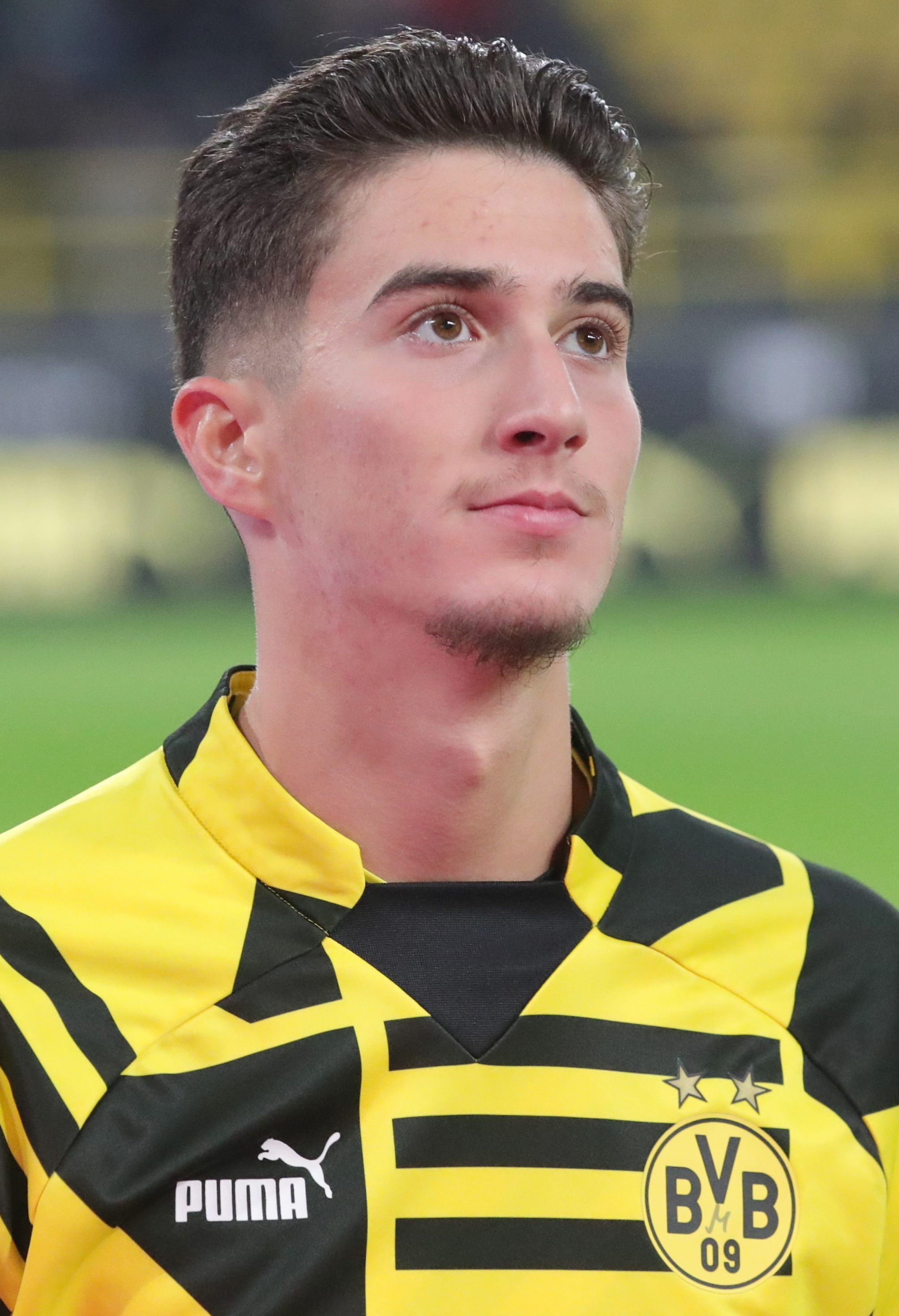
- Gürpüz in 2022

Personal information
- Date of birth: 22 January 2003 (age 23)
- Place of birth: Duisburg, Germany
- Height: 1.75 m (5 ft 9 in)
- Position: Attacking midfielder

Team information
- Current team: Çorum (on loan from Trabzonspor)
- Number: 21

Youth career
- –2011: Hamborn 07
- 2011–2016: Schalke 04
- 2016–2021: Borussia Dortmund

Senior career*
Years	Team	Apps	(Gls)
2021–2023	Borussia Dortmund II	14	(1)
2023–	Trabzonspor	5	(1)
2024–2025	→ Fatih Karagümrük (loan)	35	(5)
2025–2026	→ Gençlerbirliği (loan)	29	(0)
2026–	→ Çorum (loan)	2	(0)

International career^{‡}
2019	Turkey U16	4	(0)
2021	Germany U19	8	(1)
2022–2023	Turkey U21	4	(0)
- * Club domestic league appearances and goals as of 16 October 2026 ‡ National team caps and goals as of 19:28, 29 November 2022 (UTC)

Göktan Gürpüz (born 22 January 2003) is a professional footballer who plays as midfielder for Süper Lig club Çorum on loan from Trabzonspor. Born in Duisburg, Germany, he is a former youth international for Turkey.

== Career ==
Gürpüz is a youth product of the academies of Hamborn 07, Schalke and Borussia Dortmund. He was promoted to Borussia Dortmund's reserves in 2021, and made bench appearances for the senior squad in the Bundesliga several times during the 2022-23 season. On 17 December 2021, he signed his first professional contract with the club. He made his professional debut with Borussia Dortmund II in a 2–0 3. Liga loss to Freiburg II on 28 August 2022.

On 19 July 2023, Borussia announced his transfer to Trabzonspor in Turkey.

== International career ==
Born in Germany, Gürpüz is of Turkish descent. He first represented the Turkey U16s in 2019, before playing for the Germany U19s in 2021. In November 2021, he again switched to represent the Turkey U21s in November 2022.

== Playing style ==
Gürpüz is a midfielder, is quick to act and has positional awareness.
