= Saint-Nicodème =

Saint-Nicodème Sant-Nigouden
- Commune
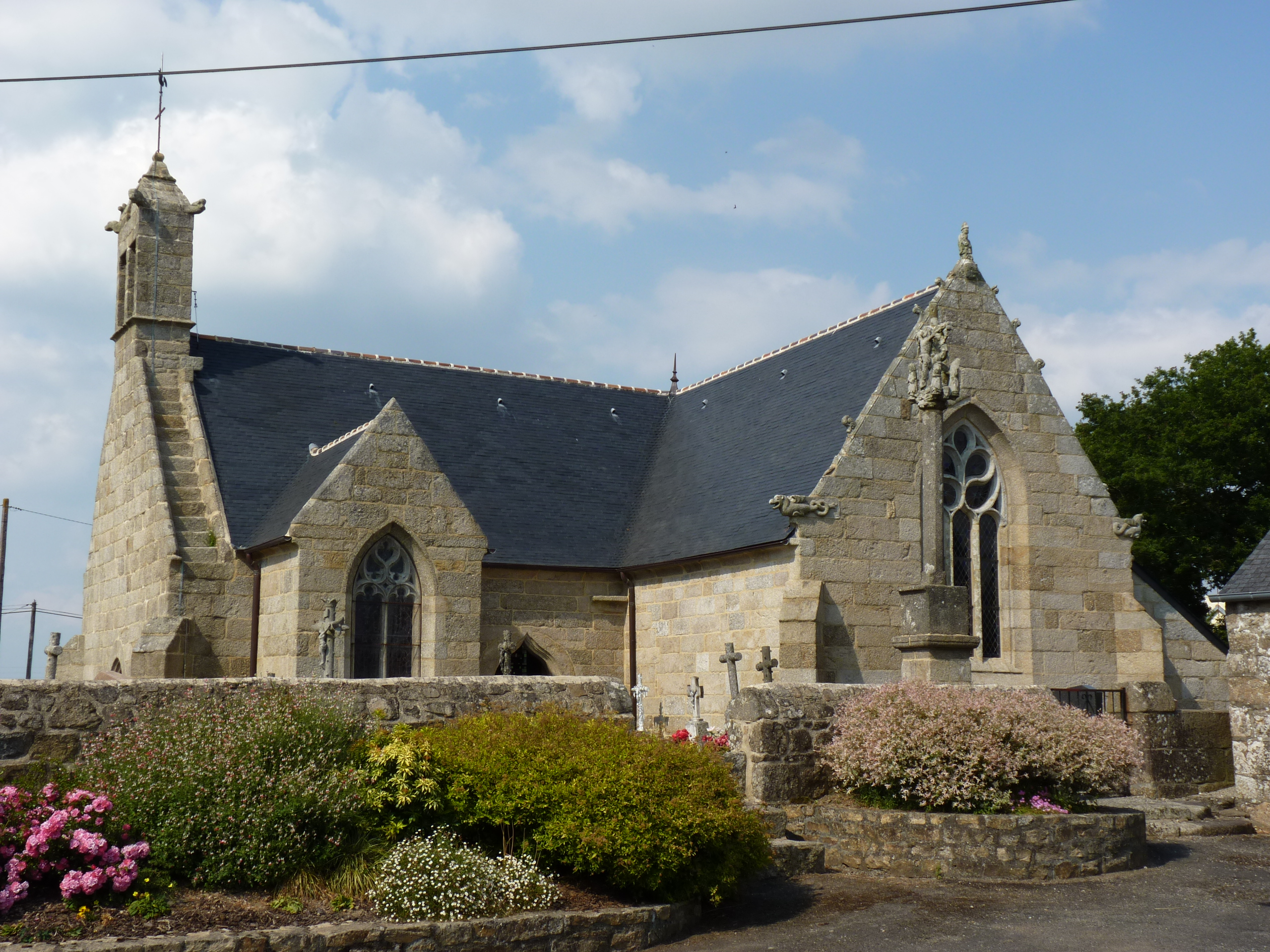
- The church of Saint-Nicodème
- Location of Saint-Nicodème
- Location within France Location within Brittany
- Coordinates: 48°20′36″N 3°20′16″W
- Country: France
- Region: Brittany
- Department: Côtes-d'Armor
- Arrondissement: Guingamp
- Canton: Callac
- Intercommunality: Guingamp-Paimpol Agglomération

Government
  - Mayor (2020–2026): Guy Perrot
- Area^{1}: 16.94 km^{2} (6.54 sq mi)
- Highest elevation: 293 m (961 ft)
- Lowest elevation: 215 m (705 ft)
- Population (2023): 167
  - Density: 9.86/km^{2} (25.5/sq mi)
- Time zone: UTC+01:00 (CET)
  - Summer (DST): UTC+02:00 (CEST)
- INSEE/Postal code: 22320 /22160
- ^{1} French Land Register data, which excludes lakes, ponds, glaciers > 1 km^{2} (0.386 sq mi or 247 acres) and river estuaries.

Saint-Nicodème (French pronunciation: [sɛ̃ nikɔdɛm]; Breton: Sant-Nigouden) is a commune in the Côtes-d'Armor department of Brittany in northwestern France.

== Population ==
Historical population
Year	Pop.	±% p.a.
1968	316	—
1975	274	−2.02%
1982	226	−2.71%
1990	209	−0.97%
1999	168	−2.40%
2007	156	−0.92%
2012	171	+1.85%
2017	168	−0.35%
2023	167	−0.10%
Source: INSEE

Inhabitants of Saint-Nicodème are called nicodémois in French.

== See also ==
- Communes of the Côtes-d'Armor department
- Frères Morvan
