= Papadopoli =

Papadopoli is the Italian form of the common Greek name Papadopoulos. It may refer to:

- The Papadopoli family, a Venetian patrician family with roots from Crete, which gave its name to all of the following :
  - Palazzo Papadopoli, a Baroque palace in Venice
  - Palazzo Foresti Papadopoli, a palace in the Tolentini area of Venice, located next to the Giardini Papadopoli
  - Giardini Papadopoli (litt. "Papadopoli Gardens"), a 19th-century park in Venice
  - Niccolò Comneno Papadopoli (1655–1740), a Greek-Italian lawyer and historian
  - Antonio Papadopoli (1802-1844), Venetian scholar and benefactor
  - Niccolò Papadopoli a.k.a. Nicolo Papadopoli Aldobrandini (1841-1922), Italian politician

== See also ==
- Papadopoulos, the most common Greek surname
