= Nikodem Piotrowski =

American professor and lawyer

- Born: 1863; Bnin, Kórnik
- Died: February 6, 1932 (aged 68–69); Chicago, Illinois

Academic background
- Education: University of Notre Dame; Indiana University at Valparaiso

Academic work
- Institutions: St. Thomas College; Loyola University Chicago

Nikodem L. Piotrowski (1863–6 February 1932) was a Polish-American professor, lawyer and president of the Polish Roman Catholic Union of America (PRCUA).

== Early life and education ==
Nikodem was born in 1863 in Bnin to Szymon Piotrowski. During his early life, he studied at local schools and in Berlin. In 1882, he moved to the United States, studying at the University of Notre Dame before graduating from the Indiana University at Valparaiso.

== Career ==
=== Lawyer and politician ===
In 1889, Nikodem was admitted to practice law. He was professor of physics and chemistry at the University of St. Thomas, then known as St. Thomas College, between 1889 and 1890. He also taught law at Loyola University Chicago. He began practicing law in Detroit in 1891, and later moved to Chicago in 1892 and started his own law practice.

Between 1897 and 1902, Nikodem was assistant corporate attorney for the city of Chicago. In 1906, he was nominated by the Democratic Party as a candidate for the position of treasurer of Illinois, losing to John Smulski. He was noted by the National Corporation Register in 1907 as "one of the best known Poles in the city [of Chicago]."

In 1911, Nikodem was appointed attorney for Chicago; he was also appointed legal advisor for the PRCUA the same year. He served in the former position until 1915 when he resigned to become a correspondent for the Chicago Herald in Europe. He also served as treasurer of the Polish National Department, for which he was awarded the High Medal of the Rebuilt Homeland. In 1923, he was awarded the Commander's Cross of the Order of Polonia Restituta.

=== PRCUA ===
In 1917, Nikodem was elected president of the PRCUA; he was re-elected in 1919. During his term as president, he increased membership fees and implemented a 50-cent one-time tax to cover benefits for those that died in military service; according to Karol Wachtel, the former laid the foundation for further development in the PRCUA.

During his presidency, a daily newspaper, Dziennik Zjednoczenia, was established.

== Death ==
Nikodem died on February 6, 1932, at Billings Memorial Hospital in Chicago following a surgery. He was buried in St. Adalbert Cemetery.
