= Prince Aning =

Dutch footballer (born 2004)

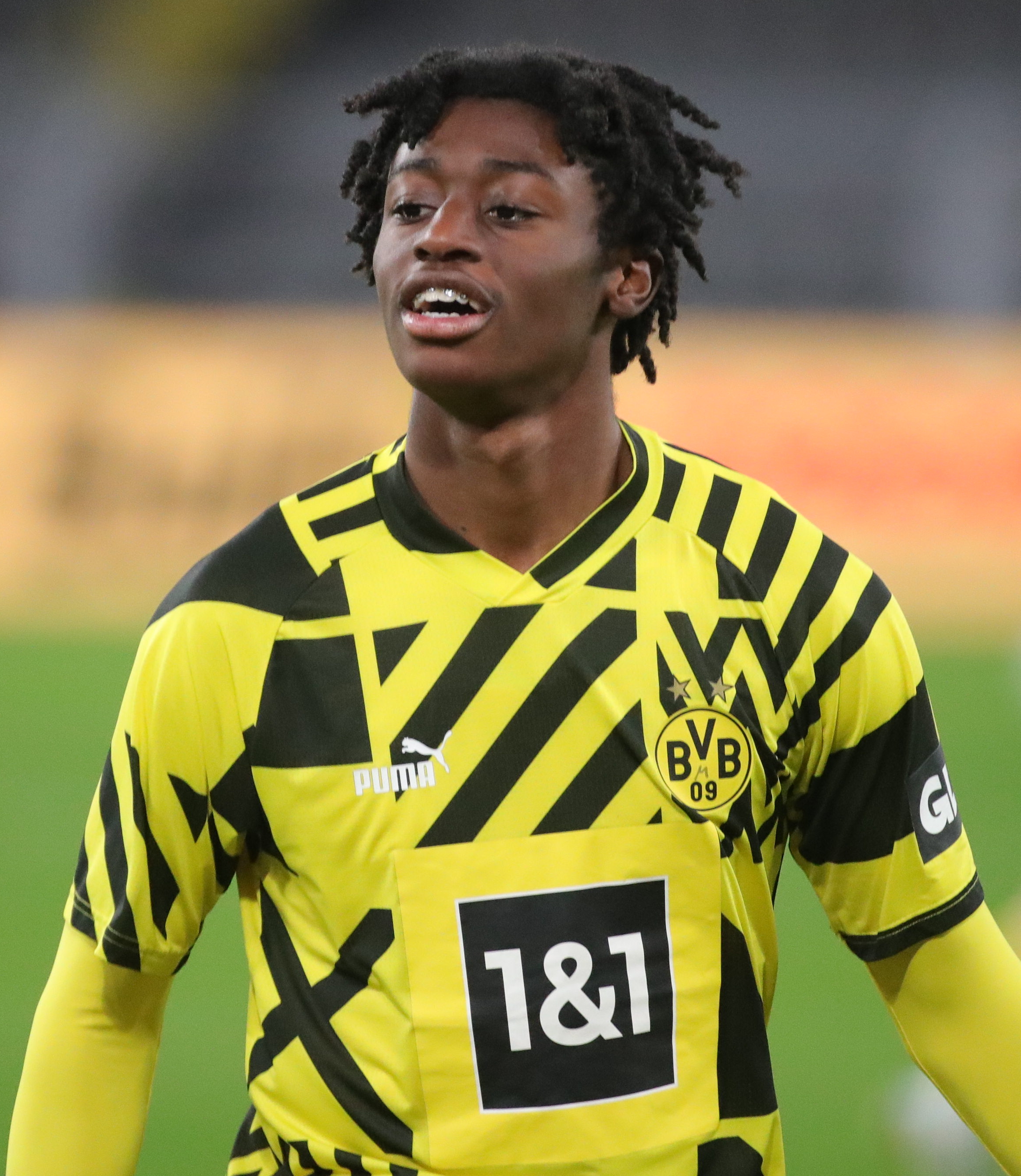
- Aning with Borussia Dortmund II in 2023

Personal information
- Full name: Prince Adu-Addae Aning
- Date of birth: 23 April 2004 (age 22)
- Place of birth: Amsterdam, Netherlands
- Height: 1.76 m (5 ft 9 in)
- Position: Left-back

Team information
- Current team: Telstar
- Number: 5

Youth career
- OSV Amsterdam
- 2012–2022: Ajax

Senior career*
Years	Team	Apps	(Gls)
2022–2026	Borussia Dortmund II	34	(0)
2026–	Telstar	4	(0)

International career
2019	Netherlands U16	1	(0)
2021–2022	Netherlands U18	8	(1)
2022	Netherlands U19	3	(0)
2023	Netherlands U20	1	(0)
- * Club domestic league appearances and goals as of 19:21, 9 September 2026 (UTC)

Prince Adu-Addae Aning (born 23 April 2004) is a Dutch professional footballer who plays as a left-back for Eredivisie club Telstar.

== Club career ==
Aning joined Borussia Dortmund in July 2022 from Dutch side Ajax.

=== Telstar ===
On 23 July 2026, Aning signed a two-year contract with Telstar, with the club holding an option for a further year. He made his competitive debut for the club on 8 August, the opening matchday of the season, replacing Soufiane Hetli in the 63rd minute of a 2–1 away win over NEC.

== International career ==
Born in the Netherlands, Aning is of Ghanaian descent. He has represented the Netherlands at youth international level.

== Career statistics ==
As of match played 6 September 2026

Appearances and goals by club, season and competition
Club	Season	League			Cup		Other		Total	
Club	Season	Division	Apps	Goals	Apps	Goals	Apps	Goals	Apps	Goals
Borussia Dortmund II	2022–23	3. Liga	16	0	—		—		16	0
Borussia Dortmund II	2023–24	3. Liga	7	0	—		—		7	0
Borussia Dortmund II	2024–25	3. Liga	8	0	—		—		8	0
Borussia Dortmund II	2025–26	Regionalliga West	3	0	—		—		3	0
Borussia Dortmund II	Total		34	0	—		—		34	0
Telstar	2026–27	Eredivisie	4	0	0	0	—		4	0
Career total			38	0	0	0	0	0	38	0
