= Nikos Krotsidhas =

Greek footballer

Personal information
- Full name: Nikolaos Krotsidhas
- Date of birth: 24 March 1986 (age 40)
- Place of birth: Mytilene, Greece
- Position: Midfielder

Team information
- Current team: Aiolikos
- Number: 27

Senior career*
| Years | Team | Apps | (Gls) |
| n/a–n/a | Sparti | n/a (n/a) | |
| n/a–n/a | Paggortyniakos | n/a (n/a) | |
| n/a–n/a | Pangytheatikos | n/a (n/a) | |
| 2007–2008 | Aiolikos | 5 | (1) |
- * Club domestic league appearances and goals

Nikos Krotsidhas (born 24 March 1986) is a Greek football player who plays for Aiolikos.

He previously played for Aiolikos in the Gamma Ethniki.
