= Nikodem Sujecki =

Polish footballer

Personal information
- Date of birth: 27 February 2003 (age 23)
- Place of birth: Kutno, Poland
- Height: 1.86 m (6 ft 1 in)
- Position: Goalkeeper

Team information
- Current team: KS Kutno
- Number: 1

Youth career
- 2011–2013: MKS Kutno
- 2013–2017: SMS Łódź
- 2017–2020: Pogoń Szczecin

Senior career*
| Years | Team | Apps | (Gls) |
| 2019–2020 | Pogoń Szczecin II | 5 | (0) |
| 2020–2022 | Pogoń Szczecin | 0 | (0) |
| 2020–2021 | → Olimpia Grudziądz (loan) | 32 | (0) |
| 2021–2022 | → Skra Częstochowa (loan) | 7 | (0) |
| 2022–2024 | Resovia | 1 | (0) |
| 2024 | → Olimpia Grudziądz (loan) | 0 | (0) |
| 2024– | KS Kutno | 21 | (0) |

International career
| 2018 | Poland U15 | 2 | (0) |
| 2018 | Poland U16 | 2 | (0) |
- * Club domestic league appearances and goals as of 09:48, 19 June 2025 (UTC)

Nikodem Sujecki (born 27 February 2003) is a Polish professional footballer who plays as a goalkeeper for IV liga Łódź club KS Kutno.

== Career statistics ==
As of match played 14 June 2025

Appearances and goals by club, season and competition
| Club | Season | League | | | Polish Cup | | Europe | | Other | | Total | |
| Club | Season | Division | Apps | Goals | Apps | Goals | Apps | Goals | Apps | Goals | Apps | Goals |
|---|---|---|---|---|---|---|---|---|---|---|---|---|
| Pogoń Szczecin II | 2018–19 | III liga, gr. II | 2 | 0 | — | | — | | — | | 2 | 0 |
| Pogoń Szczecin II | 2020–21 | III liga, gr. II | 3 | 0 | — | | — | | — | | 3 | 0 |
| Pogoń Szczecin II | Total | | 5 | 0 | — | | — | | — | | 5 | 0 |
| Pogoń Szczecin | 2020–21 | Ekstraklasa | 0 | 0 | 0 | 0 | 0 | 0 | — | | 0 | 0 |
| Pogoń Szczecin | 2021–22 | Ekstraklasa | 0 | 0 | 0 | 0 | 0 | 0 | — | | 0 | 0 |
| Pogoń Szczecin | Total | | 0 | 0 | 0 | 0 | 0 | 0 | — | | 0 | 0 |
| Olimpia Grudziądz (loan) | 2020–21 | II liga | 32 | 0 | 0 | 0 | — | | — | | 32 | 0 |
| Skra Częstochowa (loan) | 2021–22 | I liga | 7 | 0 | 0 | 0 | — | | — | | 7 | 0 |
| Resovia | 2022–23 | I liga | 0 | 0 | 3 | 0 | — | | — | | 3 | 0 |
| Resovia | 2023–24 | I liga | 1 | 0 | 0 | 0 | — | | — | | 1 | 0 |
| Resovia | Total | | 1 | 0 | 3 | 0 | — | | — | | 4 | 0 |
| Olimpia Grudziądz (loan) | 2023–24 | II liga | 0 | 0 | — | | — | | — | | 0 | 0 |
| KS Kutno | 2024–25 | IV liga Łódź | 21 | 0 | — | | — | | — | | 21 | 0 |
| Career total | | | 66 | 0 | 3 | 0 | 0 | 0 | — | | 69 | 0 |
