= Nicodemus (given name) =

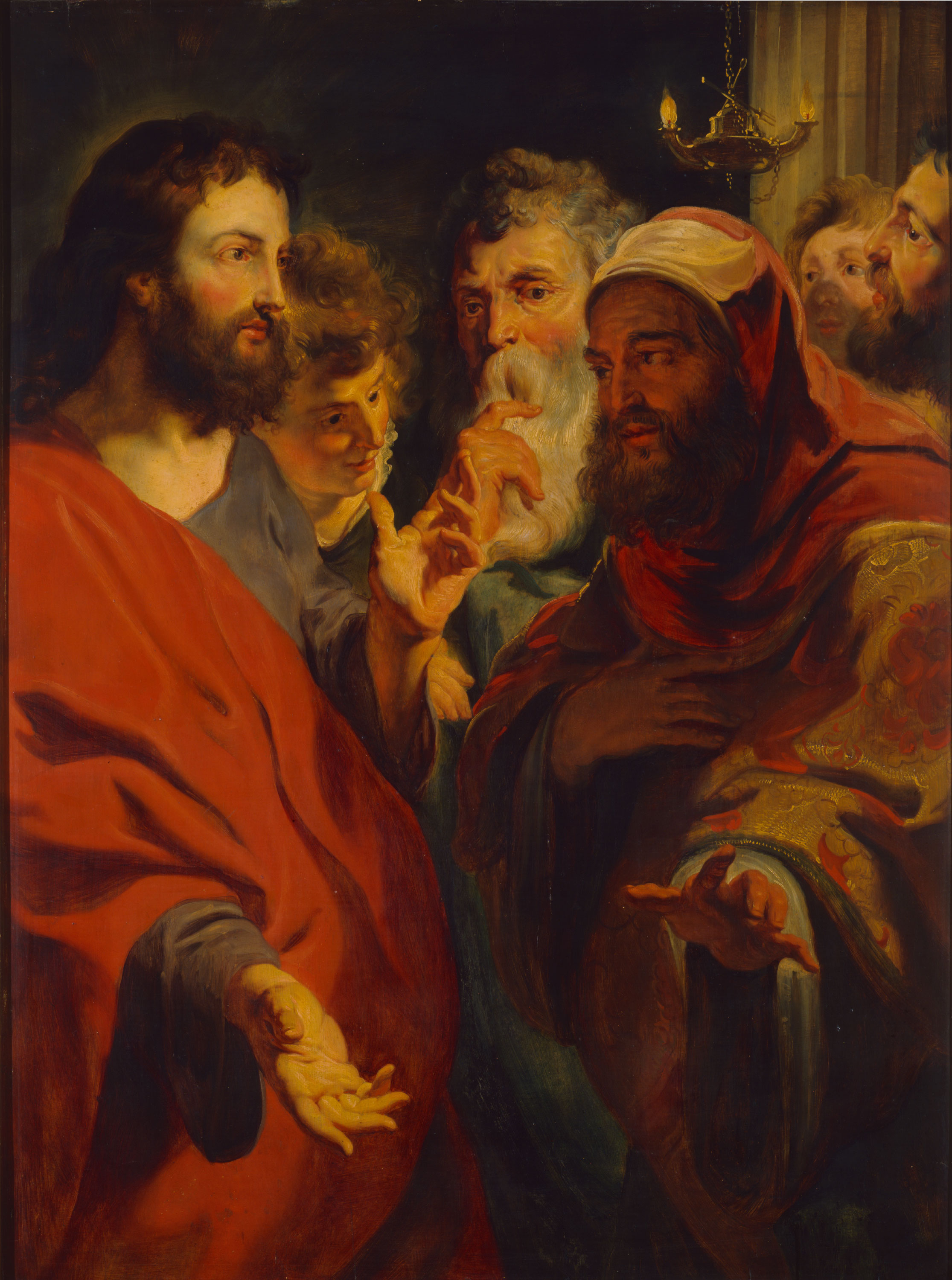
- Jesus Christ instructing Nicodemus by Jacob Jordaens.
- Gender: Masculine
- Language: Greek

Origin
- Meaning: “Victory of the people”

Nicodemus is a masculine given name of Greek origin meaning “victory of the people.” Nicodemus is a Biblical figure. Nikodem, a Croatian and Polish version of the name, was among the most popular names for newborn boys in Poland in 2022.

== Versions in different languages ==
- Albanian: Nikodem
- Arabic: نيقوديموس (Niqudimus), نيقوديم (Niqudim)
- Basque: Nikodemo
- Belarusian: Нікадзім (Nikadzim)
- Bulgarian: Никодим (Nikodim)
- Catalan: Nicodem
- Chinese: 尼哥底母 (Ní gē dǐ mǔ)
- Croatian: Nikodem
- Czech: Nikodém, Nikodým
- Danish: Nikodemus
- Dutch: Nikodemus
- Esperanto: Nikodemo
- Finnish: Nikodemos
- French: Nicodème
- German: Nikodemus
- Greek: Νικόδημος (Nikódimos)
- Hebrew: ניקודמוס (Nyqwdmws)
- Hungarian: Nikodémosz
- Indonesian: Nikodemus
- Italian: Nicodemo
- Japanese: ニコデモ (Nikodemo)
- Kiswahili: Nikodemo
- Korean: 니고데모 (Nigodemo)
- Macedonian: Никодим (Nikodim)
- Maltese: Nikodemu
- Norwegian: Nikodemus
- Polish: Nikodem
- Portuguese: Nicodemo
- Romanian: Nicodim
- Russian: Никодим (Nikodim)
- Serbian: Никодим (Nikodim)
- Slovak: Nikodém
- Slovenian: Nikodém
- Spanish: Nicodemo
- Swedish: Nikodemos
- Tamil: நிக்கதேம் (Nikodim)
- Ukrainian: Никодим (Nykodym)

== People ==
=== Saints ===
- Nicodemus, Jewish pharisee and secret disciple of Christ
- Nicodemus of Mammola (900–990), Italian hermit
- Nicodemus of Palermo (died 1083), Eastern Orthodox bishop in Sicily
- Nicodemus I of Peć (died 1325), Serbian Archbishop and monk-scribe
- Nicodemus of Tismana (c. 1320–1406), Eastern Orthodox monastic founder, translator and monk-scribe in the Balkans
- Nicodemus the Hagiorite (1749–1809), Greek Orthodox philosopher, hagiographer, and monk
- Nicodemus of Dalmatia (1845–1915), Serbian Orthodox bishop and hieroconfessor

=== Others ===
- Nicodemus ben Gurion, a wealthy Jewish man who lived in Jerusalem in the 1st century AD.
- Philipp Nicodemus Frischlin (1547–1590), German scholar
- Nicodemus Tessin the Younger (1654–1728), Swedish architect and city planner
- Nicodemus Tessin the Elder (1615–1681), Swedish architect
- Nicodème Audet (1822–1905), Canadian merchant and politician
- Nikodim Kondakov (1844–1925), Russian historian
- Nicodemus D. Wernette (1885–1956), American judge
- Nicodemo Scarfo (1929–2017), Italian-American mafioso
- Nicodemus (musician) (1957–1996), Jamaican dancehall deejay
- Nikodimos Papavasiliou (born 1970), Cypriot manager and former footballer
- Fred Nicodemus, a physicist, author of the bidirectional reflectance distribution function

== Apocryphal gospel ==
- Gospel of Nicodemus, a fourth-century apocryphal gospel, claimed to be derived from a work by Nicodemus from the Gospel of John

== Fictional characters ==
- Nicodemus, a wise rat who helps the title character in the book Mrs. Frisby and the Rats of NIMH and in the 1982 animated film adaptation The Secret of NIMH
- Nicodemus, Robin Williams' character's dog in the License to Wed
- Nicodemus, a villain in Batman
- Nicodemus Archleone, a villain in The Dresden Files
- Nicodemus Boffin, nouveau riche character in Charles Dickens' Our Mutual Friend
- Nicodemus Dumps, misanthropic character in Charles Dickens' Sketches by Boz tale the Bloomsbury Christening
- Nicodemus Legend, the protagonist in the television series Legend
- Nicodemus, the deputy of the sheriff (Gospel Bill) in the Christian children's show The Gospel Bill Show
