= Nikos Kalokeris =

Greek footballer

Personal information
- Full name: Nikolaos Kalokeris
- Date of birth: 2 May 1986 (age 40)
- Place of birth: Agrinio, Greece
- Height: 1.80 m (5 ft 11 in)
- Position: Defender

Youth career
- Elaiofyto

Senior career*
Years	Team	Apps	(Gls)
2004–2010	Panetolikos	50	(0)
2011	Tilikratis F.C.	0	(0)
2012–	Aris Etoliko		
- * Club domestic league appearances and goals

Nikos Kalokeris (Greek: Νίκος Καλοκαίρης; born 2 May 1986) is a Greek professional football defender who is currently playing for Aris Etoliko. Kalokairis previously played for Panetolikos in the Greek Beta Ethniki.
