= Nikos Kostakis =

Greek footballer

Personal information
- Full name: Nikolaos Kostakis
- Date of birth: 16 February 1973 (age 53)
- Place of birth: Athens, Greece
- Height: 1.77 m (5 ft 9 1/2 in)
- Position: Goalkeeper

Team information
- Current team: Thrasyvoulos
- Number: 1

Senior career*
| Years | Team | Apps | (Gls) |
| 1991–1998 | Panargiakos | 31 | (0) |
| 1998–2000 | Ethnikos Asteras | 9 | (0) |
| 2000–2001 | Nafpaktiakos Asteras | 30 | (0) |
| 2001–2004 | Panionios | 9 | (0) |
| 2004–2007 | Akratitos | 27 | (0) |
| 2007– | Thraysvoulos | 63 | (0) |
- * Club domestic league appearances and goals

Nikos Kostakis (Greek: Νίκος Κωστάκης, born 16 February 1973) is a Greek former professional football (soccer) goalkeeper.

Kostakis played for Thraysvoulos and Akratitos, joining from Panionios, and having previously played for Nafpaktiakos Asteras, Ethnikos Asteras and APO Panargeiakos from 1991 through 2000.

Kostakis has never, throughout his long career, been the first choice goalkeeper at any of his clubs. In his first year at Akratitos he played 25 games, the most he has played in one year at any point in his career, although currently he is second choice to the former Romanian international Bogdan Stelea.
