= Nikodem Skotarczak =

Polish mafioso and businessman

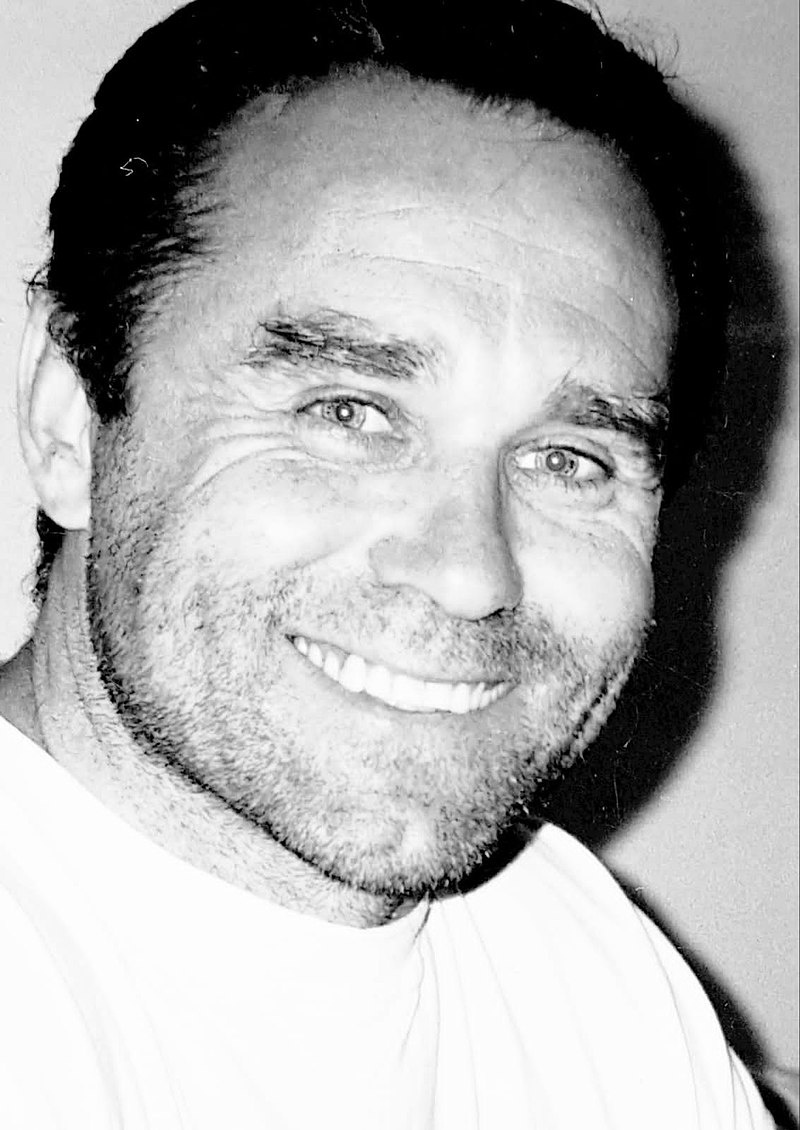
Nikoś, his right hand known as "Kura" (Hen) and guy known as Pepsi in Villa Hestia, Sopot, Poland.Photo from the book: Nikoś Ruletka życia. Nikodem Skotarczak

Nikodem "Nikoś" Skotarczak (1954–1998), born in Gdańsk, was a Polish mafioso known for dealing in stolen cars, as well as a businessman and sports sponsor.

Movies:

- His life was loosely fictionalised in Maciej Kawulski's 2022 Netflix film How I Fell in Love with a Gangster, which the director described as supposedly inspired by Skotarczak's life. The film drew largely negative reviews. Ready Steady Cut called it "an utterly ridiculous Goodfellas wannabe", too "overwrought with style and uneven in its storytelling to be taken seriously", while writing for Newonce, Jacek Sobczyński said the 185-minute film "does not know whether it wants to be an action film or a drama". Skotarczak's widow, Edyta Skotarczak, said the filmmakers never contacted her or her children. She called the project "one great blasphemy" that showed her husband in a "negative, humiliating and partially false light", and later sued the filmmakers and Netflix.
- In 1996, Polish television produced "Kraina złudzeń", a documentary about Nikodem Skotarczak "Nikoś", directed by Wojciech Szumowski. It won the Main Prize at the "Człowiek w zagrożeniu" Media Festival in Łódź.

Books:

Several books have been published about Nikodem Skotarczak, including:

- In 1993, Werner Rixdorf, Das steinerne Gesicht. Der Pate Von Danzig Nikodem Skotarczak - (eng.) The Stone Face: The Godfather of Gdańsk, Nikodem Skotarczak.
- In 2018 his biography, Spowiedź Nikosia zza grobu, was written up by the later 7th Polish president Karol Nawrocki, under the pseudonym Tadeusz Batyr.
- In 2022, Edyta Skotarczak, Nikoś Ruletka życia, the author is Nikoś's widow.

Biography and interesting facts:

After football team Lechia Gdańsk, which he sponsored, won the Polish Cup in 1983, the city's mayor, Kazimierz Rynkowski, awarded him the title "Distinguished for Gdańsk" (Zasłużony dla Gdańska).

Nikodem Skotarczak, known as "Nikoś", was born on 29 June 1954 in Gdańsk. He began his career in the 1970s as a bodyguard for Michał Antoniszyn, known as "Mecenas", a well-known Tricity businessman and currency dealer. Antoniszyn owned several nightclubs, including "Lucynka", "Wrzos", "Krokodyl" and "Maxim", which he ran through front men. Seeing Nikoś's potential, Antoniszyn made him his right-hand man, and the two worked together for many years. Nikoś later went to Budapest. In the 1980s he smuggled a printing press from Italy to Gdańsk for the anti-communist underground. He then became an official and sponsor of Lechia Gdańsk. During that time the club won the Polish Cup, played Juventus twice (Juventus's squad then included the Polish football legend Zbigniew Boniek) and was promoted to the top division. He later moved to West Germany. There he ran SKOTEX, an electronics trading company, and at the same time organised the smuggling of stolen cars from West Germany, France and Austria into Poland. In friendly workshops the cars had their identification numbers altered and received new documents. They were then sold in Poland or further east. In the late 1980s a German court sentenced him to prison for driving a stolen car, and he was held in Berlin. After only a few months he made a daring escape and returned to Poland. By then "Nikoś" was a large-scale dealer in stolen cars. His cars were sold to members of the elite of the time, including local and central officials of the communist party (PZPR), militiamen, government officials and church hierarchs. His business ran through an extensive network of domestic and international contacts. He was suspected of leading an organised criminal group that included militiamen, thieves and car-workshop owners. Even so, in the early 1990s police ended Operation "GRUDA", the investigation into his group. They did so at the request of Major Edmund Mucha, who later headed the Gdańsk office of the Central Bureau of Investigation (CBŚ). The case was officially discontinued without any charges against him. Skotarczak then also began investing further in legitimate businesses. At the time, the German police were looking for him on an arrest warrant for his prison escape. He hid in several places, including Kraków, where he met his last wife, Edyta. This did not stop him from befriending and doing business with people on Wprost magazine's list of the 100 richest Poles, or from socialising with many public figures, including athletes and actors. In 1993 an elite unit of the National Police Headquarters, led by Inspector Adam Rapacki, arrested him in Warsaw. Judge Barbara Piwnik of the Warsaw court convicted him of using a counterfeit passport and escaping from a police convoy. It was the only final conviction he received in Poland. He was released early for good behaviour after one year. He then opened several car dealerships and continued to invest in legitimate ventures. He married four times and was the biological father of four children, two of them with his last wife. In the 1990s journalists dubbed him "the Godfather of the Polish car mafia" and "the Godfather of the Gdańsk mafia". No final court judgment ever supported those labels. In 1996 he played a cameo in the film Sztos, co-produced by Wojciech Kurowski together with Cezary Pazura and Olaf Lubaszenko. He was shot dead on 24 April 1998 at the Las Vegas club in Gdynia. He was there celebrating the name day of his friend and business partner Wojciech Kurowski, known as "Kura". Kurowski was a co-founder of the insurance company Hestia and one of the wealthiest businessmen on the Polish coast in the 1990s. A police team led by Mariusz Sobczyk investigated the killing, supervised first by prosecutor Janusz Kaczmarek and then by Konrad Kornatowski. The investigation did not establish who fired the shots or who ordered the killing, and it was discontinued after two years. "Nikoś" is buried at Srebrzysko Cemetery in Gdańsk. His killers and whoever ordered the killing have never been identified.
