= Antonios Papadopoulos (footballer) =

Greek footballer (born 1999)

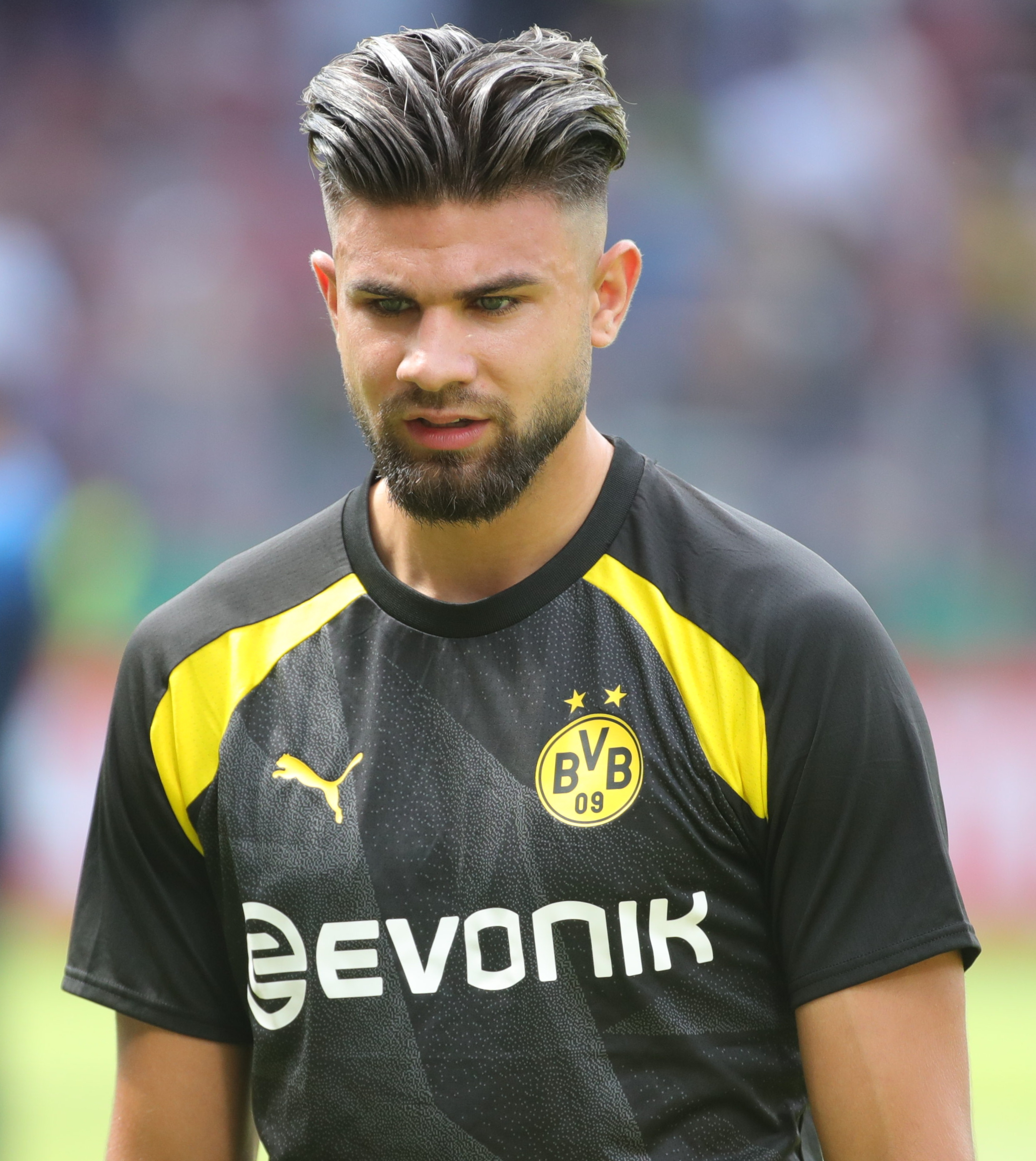
- Papadopoulos with Borussia Dortmund in 2023

Personal information
- Full name: Antonios Papadopoulos
- Date of birth: 10 September 1999 (age 27)
- Place of birth: Bad Cannstatt, Germany
- Height: 1.85 m (6 ft 1 in)
- Position: Defensive midfielder

Team information
- Current team: Lugano
- Number: 6

Youth career
- SC Weinstadt
- –2013: Stuttgarter Kickers
- 2013–2015: FSV Waiblingen
- 2015–2018: VfR Aalen

Senior career*
Years	Team	Apps	(Gls)
2017–2019	VfR Aalen	13	(0)
2019–2021	Hallescher FC	58	(3)
2021–2024	Borussia Dortmund II	70	(4)
2021–2024	Borussia Dortmund	5	(0)
2024–	Lugano	74	(6)
- * Club domestic league appearances and goals as of 28 September 2026

Antonios Papadopoulos (Greek: Αντώνιος Παπαδόπουλος; born 10 September 1999) is a German professional footballer who plays as a defensive midfielder for Swiss club Lugano.

== Career ==
Papadopoulos began his career with VfR Aalen in 2017, and transferred to Hallescher FC in 2019. In 2021, he transferred to the Borussia Dortmund reserves. He appeared for the senior Borussia Dortmund team in a 3–0 DFB-Pokal win over SV Wehen Wiesbaden on 7 August 2021. A week later, on 14 August, he made his Bundesliga debut in a 5–2 victory over Eintracht Frankfurt.

In August 2022, he extended his contract with Borussia Dortmund until 2024. Later that year, on 5 October, he played his first UEFA Champions League match which ended in a 4–1 away victory over Sevilla. On 4 May 2024, he made his first Bundesliga start in a 5–1 victory over FC Augsburg.

On 5 June 2024, Papadopoulos signed a three-year contract with Lugano in Switzerland.

== Personal life ==
Born in Germany, Papadopoulos is of Greek descent.

== Career statistics ==
As of match played 4 May 2024.

Appearances and goals by club, season and competition
Club	Season	League			DFB-Pokal		Europe		Other		Total	
Club	Season	Division	Apps	Goals	Apps	Goals	Apps	Goals	Apps	Goals	Apps	Goals
Borussia Dortmund II	2021–22	3. Liga	25	1	—		—		—		25	1
Borussia Dortmund II	2022–23	3. Liga	27	1	—		—		—		27	1
Borussia Dortmund II	2023–24	3. Liga	17	2	—		—		—		17	2
Borussia Dortmund II	Total		69	4	—		—		—		69	4
Borussia Dortmund	2021–22	Bundesliga	2	0	1	0	0	0	0	0	3	0
Borussia Dortmund	2022–23	Bundesliga	1	0	0	0	2 (Note: Appearances in UEFA Champions League)	0	0	0	3	0
Borussia Dortmund	2023–24	Bundesliga	2	0	0	0	0	0	0	0	2	0
Borussia Dortmund	Total		5	0	1	0	2	0	0	0	8	0
Career total			74	4	1	0	2	0	0	0	77	0
