= 2018–19 FC Augsburg season =

FC Augsburg
2018–19 season
- Chairman: Klaus Hofmann
- Manager: Manuel Baum
- Stadium: WWK Arena
- Bundesliga: 15th
- DFB-Pokal: Quarter-finals
- Top goalscorer: League: Alfreð Finnbogason (10 goals); All: Alfreð Finnbogason (10 goals)
- Highest home attendance: 30,660
- Lowest home attendance: 25,733
- Average home league attendance: 28,618
- Biggest win: Augsburg 6–0 Stuttgart
- Biggest defeat: Wolfsburg 8–1 Augsburg
Home colours	Away colours	Third colours

The 2018–19 FC Augsburg season was the 112th season in the football club's history and 8th consecutive and overall season in the top flight of German football, the Bundesliga, having been promoted from the 2. Bundesliga in 2011. In addition to the domestic league, FC Augsburg also participated in this season's edition of the domestic cup, the DFB-Pokal. This was the 10th season for Augsburg in the WWK Arena, located in Augsburg, Bavaria, Germany. The season covered a period from 1 July 2018 to 30 June 2019.

== Friendly matches ==
Win Draw Loss

8 July 2018 Friendly	Augsburg	1–1	Austria Lustenau	Mals
16:00 CEST	Córdova 54'	Report	Tuncer 32'	Stadium: Stadio Malles Venosta; Attendance: 500

14 July 2018 Friendly	Augsburg	2–0	Würzburger Kickers	Augsburg
13:00 CEST	Schieber 38'; Schmid 56'	Report		Stadium: Rosenaustadion; Attendance: 1,907

18 July 2018 Friendly	Augsburg	2–1	Middlesbrough	Bad Wörishofen
17:30 CEST	Baier 37'; Hahn 61'	Report	Wing 86'	Stadium: Sportplatz Bad Wörishofen

26 July 2018 Friendly	Borussia Mönchengladbach	2–1	Augsburg	Rottach-Egern
18:00 CEST	Strobl 64'; Hofmann 66'	Report	Córdova 23'	Stadium: Sportplatz Birkenmoos; Attendance: 2,500

4 August 2018 Friendly	Newcastle United	0–1	Augsburg	Newcastle upon Tyne
15:00 BST		Report	Gregoritsch 61'	Stadium: St James' Park

12 August 2018 Friendly	Augsburg	0–1	Athletic Bilbao	Augsburg
15:30 CEST		Report	López 72'	Stadium: Augsburg Arena; Referee: Benjamin Cortus

== Competitions ==
Win Draw Loss

=== Overview ===
Competition	First match	Last match	Starting round	Final position	Record							
Competition	First match	Last match	Starting round	Final position	Pld	W	D	L	GF	GA	GD	Win %
Bundesliga	25 August 2018	18 May 2019	Matchday 1	15th	34	8	8	18	51	71	−20	23.53
DFB-Pokal	19 August 2018	3 April 2019	First round	Quarter-finals	4	2	1	1	7	5	+2	50.00
Total					38	10	9	19	58	76	−18	26.32

Last updated: 25 May 2019
Source: Competitions

=== Bundesliga ===
==== League table ====
Pos	Team	Pld	W	D	L	GF	GA	GD	Pts	Qualification or relegation
13	SC Freiburg	34	8	12	14	46	61	−15	36	
14	Schalke 04	34	8	9	17	37	55	−18	33	
15	FC Augsburg	34	8	8	18	51	71	−20	32	
16	VfB Stuttgart (R)	34	7	7	20	32	70	−38	28	Qualification for the relegation play-offs
17	Hannover 96 (R)	34	5	6	23	31	71	−40	21	Relegation to 2. Bundesliga

Source: DFB
Rules for classification: 1) Points; 2) Goal difference; 3) Goals scored; 4) Head-to-head results; 5) Head-to-head away goals scored; 6) Away goals scored; 7) Play-off
(R) Relegated

==== Results summary ====
Overall								Home						Away					
Pld	W	D	L	GF	GA	GD	Pts	W	D	L	GF	GA	GD	W	D	L	GF	GA	GD
34	8	8	18	51	71	−20	32	5	4	8	34	33	+1	3	4	10	17	38	−21

Last updated: 25 May 2019.
Source: Bundesliga

==== Results by round ====
Round	1	2	3	4	5	6	7	8	9	10	11	12	13	14	15	16	17	18	19	20	21	22	23	24	25	26	27	28	29	30	31	32	33	34
Ground	A	H	A	H	A	H	A	H	A	H	A	H	A	A	H	A	H	H	A	H	A	H	A	H	A	H	A	H	A	H	H	A	H	A
Result	W	D	L	L	D	W	L	D	W	D	L	L	L	L	D	D	L	L	L	W	L	L	L	W	D	W	L	L	W	W	L	D	L	L
Position	5	6	8	11	12	8	10	9	9	9	10	13	14	14	14	13	15	15	15	15	15	15	15	15	15	14	15	15	14	14	14	14	14	15

Updated to match(es) played on 25 May 2019. Source: DFB
A = Away; H = Home; W = Win; D = Draw; L = Loss

==== Matches ====
25 August 2018 1	Fortuna Düsseldorf	1–2	FC Augsburg	Düsseldorf
15:30 CEST (UTC+2)	Raman 39'	Report	Hinteregger 57'; Hahn 76'	Stadium: Merkur Spiel-Arena; Attendance: 40,996; Referee: Markus Schmidt

1 September 2018 2	FC Augsburg	1–1	Borussia Mönchengladbach	Augsburg
15:30 CEST (UTC+2)	Gregoritsch 12'	Report	Pléa 68'	Stadium: WWK Arena; Attendance: 29,500; Referee: Frank Willenborg

15 September 2018 3	Mainz 05	2–1	FC Augsburg	Mainz
15:30 CEST (UTC+2)	Ujah 87'; Maxim 90+3'	Report	Ji 82'	Stadium: Opel Arena; Attendance: 21,105; Referee: Martin Petersen

22 September 2018 4	FC Augsburg	2–3	Werder Bremen	Augsburg
15:30 CEST (UTC+2)	Koo 45+3'; Max 47'	Report	Kruse 34'; M. Eggestein 36'; Klaassen 75'	Stadium: WWK Arena; Attendance: 28,434; Referee: Felix Zwayer

25 September 2018 5	Bayern Munich	1–1	FC Augsburg	Munich
20:30 CEST (UTC+2)	Robben 48'	Report	Götze 86'	Stadium: Allianz Arena; Attendance: 75,000; Referee: Sören Storks

30 September 2018 6	FC Augsburg	4–1	SC Freiburg	Augsburg
18:00 CEST (UTC+2)	Caiuby 19'; Finnbogason 34', 68' (pen.), 83'	Report	Schmid 49' (o.g.)	Stadium: WWK Arena; Attendance: 26,488; Referee: Robert Kampka

6 October 2018 7	Borussia Dortmund	4–3	FC Augsburg	Dortmund
15:30 CEST (UTC+2)	Alcácer 62', 80', 90+6'; Götze 84'	Report	Finnbogason 22'; Max 71'; Gregoritsch 87'	Stadium: Signal Iduna Park; Attendance: 81,365; Referee: Markus Schmidt

20 October 2018 8	FC Augsburg	0–0	RB Leipzig	Augsburg
15:30 CEST (UTC+2)		Report		Stadium: WWK Arena; Attendance: 28,703; Referee: Tobias Welz

27 October 2018 9	Hannover 96	1–2	FC Augsburg	Hanover
15:30 CEST (UTC+2)	Bebou 72'	Report	Khedira 8'; Finnbogason 63' (pen.)	Stadium: HDI-Arena; Attendance: 37,600; Referee: Robert Kampka

3 November 2018 10	FC Augsburg	2–2	1. FC Nürnberg	Augsburg
15:30 CET (UTC+1)	Finnbogason 11'; Schmid 59'	Report	Fuchs 54'; Mühl 88'	Stadium: WWK Arena; Attendance: 30,660; Referee: Patrick Ittrich

10 November 2018 11	1899 Hoffenheim	2–1	FC Augsburg	Sinsheim
15:30 CET (UTC+1)	Kramarić 65'; Nelson 83'	Report	Finnbogason 69'	Stadium: Wirsol Rhein-Neckar-Arena; Attendance: 27,009; Referee: Robert Schröder

24 November 2018 12	FC Augsburg	1–3	Eintracht Frankfurt	Augsburg
15:30 CET (UTC+1)	Córdova 90'	Report	de Guzmán 1'; Haller 47'; Rebić 68'	Stadium: WWK Arena; Attendance: 30,660; Referee: Felix Zwayer

1 December 2018 13	VfB Stuttgart	1–0	FC Augsburg	Stuttgart
15:30 CET (UTC+1)	Donis 39'	Report		Stadium: Mercedes-Benz Arena; Attendance: 52,739; Referee: Harm Osmers

8 December 2018 14	Bayer Leverkusen	1–0	FC Augsburg	Leverkusen
15:30 CET (UTC+1)	Alario 75'	Report		Stadium: BayArena; Attendance: 25,558; Referee: Bastian Dankert

15 December 2018 15	FC Augsburg	1–1	Schalke 04	Augsburg
15:30 CET (UTC+1)	Gregoritsch 13'	Report	Caligiuri 52'	Stadium: WWK Arena; Attendance: 27,233; Referee: Manuel Gräfe

18 December 2018 16	Hertha BSC	2–2	FC Augsburg	Berlin
20:30 CET (UTC+1)	Leckie 28'; Duda 31'	Report	Hinteregger 8'; Koo 39'	Stadium: Olympiastadion Berlin; Attendance: 27,939; Referee: Frank Willenborg

23 December 2018 17	FC Augsburg	2–3	VfL Wolfsburg	Augsburg
15:30 CET (UTC+1)	Khedira 49'; Córdova 58'	Report	Guilavogui 33'; William 41'; Gerhardt 89'	Stadium: WWK Arena; Attendance: 28,152; Referee: Sören Storks

19 January 2019 18	FC Augsburg	1–2	Fortuna Düsseldorf	Augsburg
15:30 CET (UTC+1)	Schmid 64'	Report	Ducksch 45'; Raman 89'	Stadium: WWK Arena; Attendance: 27,568; Referee: Christian Dingert

26 January 2019 19	Borussia Mönchengladbach	2–0	FC Augsburg	Mönchengladbach
15:30 CET (UTC+1)	Wendt 78'; Herrmann 90+3'	Report		Stadium: Borussia-Park; Attendance: 42,509; Referee: Harm Osmers

3 February 2019 20	FC Augsburg	3–0	Mainz 05	Augsburg
15:30 CET (UTC+1)	Finnbogason 8' (pen.), 34' (pen.), 54'	Report		Stadium: WWK Arena; Attendance: 25,733; Referee: Sören Storks

10 February 2019 21	Werder Bremen	4–0	FC Augsburg	Bremen
15:30 CET (UTC+1)	Rashica 5', 28'; J. Eggestein 27'; Möhwald 83'	Report		Stadium: Weser-Stadion; Attendance: 40,138; Referee: Manuel Gräfe

15 February 2019 22	FC Augsburg	2–3	Bayern Munich	Augsburg
20:30 CET (UTC+1)	Goretzka 1' (o.g.); Ji 23'	Report	Coman 17', 45+3'; Alaba 53'	Stadium: WWK Arena; Attendance: 30,660; Referee: Bibiana Steinhaus

23 February 2019 23	SC Freiburg	5–1	FC Augsburg	Freiburg
15:30 CET (UTC+1)	Petersen 9', 43'; Grifo 30'; Waldschmidt 64'; Niederlechner 85'	Report	Khedira 52'	Stadium: Schwarzwald-Stadion; Attendance: 23,600; Referee: Tobias Welz

1 March 2019 24	FC Augsburg	2–1	Borussia Dortmund	Augsburg
20:30 CET (UTC+1)	Ji 24', 67'	Report	Alcácer 81'	Stadium: WWK Arena; Attendance: 30,660; Referee: Tobias Stieler

9 March 2019 25	RB Leipzig	0–0	FC Augsburg	Leipzig
15:30 CET (UTC+1)		Report		Stadium: Red Bull Arena; Attendance: 38,590; Referee: Sven Jablonski

16 March 2019 26	FC Augsburg	3–1	Hannover 96	Augsburg
15:30 CET (UTC+1)	Córdova 65'; Schmid 78'; Hahn 86'	Report	Weydandt 8'	Stadium: WWK Arena; Attendance: 28,136; Referee: Manuel Gräfe

30 March 2019 27	1. FC Nürnberg	3–0	FC Augsburg	Nuremberg
15:30 CET (UTC+1)	Ishak 52'; Pereira 88'; Löwen 90+1'	Report		Stadium: Max-Morlock-Stadion; Attendance: 42,658; Referee: Daniel Siebert

7 April 2019 28	FC Augsburg	0–4	1899 Hoffenheim	Augsburg
15:30 CEST (UTC+2)		Report	Kramarić 6'; Belfodil 61', 74', 82'	Stadium: WWK Arena; Attendance: 27,552; Referee: Robert Schröder

14 April 2019 29	Eintracht Frankfurt	1–3	FC Augsburg	Frankfurt
18:00 CEST (UTC+2)	Paciência 14'	Report	Richter 31', 45+4'; Gregoritsch 84'	Stadium: Commerzbank-Arena; Attendance: 51,000; Referee: Bastian Dankert

20 April 2019 30	FC Augsburg	6–0	VfB Stuttgart	Augsburg
15:30 CEST (UTC+2)	Khedira 11'; Hahn 18'; Max 29', 58'; Richter 53', 68'	Report		Stadium: WWK Arena; Attendance: 30,660; Referee: Manuel Gräfe

26 April 2019 31	FC Augsburg	1–4	Bayer Leverkusen	Augsburg
20:30 CEST (UTC+2)	Danso 12'	Report	Volland 15'; Havertz 48'; Tah 60'; Brandt 88'	Stadium: WWK Arena; Attendance: 26,404; Referee: Frank Willenborg

5 May 2019 32	Schalke 04	0–0	FC Augsburg	Gelsenkirchen
13:30 CEST (UTC+2)		Report		Stadium: Veltins-Arena; Attendance: 59,841; Referee: Manuel Gräfe

11 May 2019 33	FC Augsburg	3–4	Hertha BSC	Augsburg
15:30 CEST (UTC+2)	Hahn 10'; Gregoritsch 50' (pen.), 70'	Report	Plattenhardt 47'; Grujić 66'; Kalou 75', 90+3' (pen.)	Stadium: WWK Arena; Attendance: 29,307; Referee: Guido Winkmann

18 May 2019 34	VfL Wolfsburg	8–1	FC Augsburg	Wolfsburg
15:30 CEST (UTC+2)	Weghorst 21', 37', 55'; Knoche 41'; Ginczek 57'; Rexhbeçaj 60'; Brekalo 85'; Danso 89' (o.g.)	Report	Schieber 81'	Stadium: Volkswagen Arena; Attendance: 24,486; Referee: Felix Zwayer

=== DFB-Pokal ===
19 August 2018 First round	TSV Steinbach Haiger	1–2	FC Augsburg	Haiger
15:30 CEST (UTC+2)	Herzig 55'	Report	Richter 14'; Hahn 65'	Stadium: Sibre-Sportzentrum Haarwasen Haiger; Attendance: 4,204; Referee: Martin Thomsen

30 October 2018 Second round	FC Augsburg	3–2 (a.e.t.)	Mainz 05	Augsburg
20:45 CET (UTC+1)	Bell 40' (o.g.); Gregoritsch 86'; Caiuby 105'	Report	Mwene 19'; Quaison 45'	Stadium: WWK Arena; Attendance: 15,561; Referee: Manuel Gräfe

6 February 2019 Round of 16	Holstein Kiel	0–1	FC Augsburg	Kiel
18:30 CET (UTC+1)		Report	Gregoritsch 85'	Stadium: Holstein-Stadion; Attendance: 11,198; Referee: Frank Willenborg

2 April 2019 Quarter-finals	FC Augsburg	1–2 (a.e.t.)	RB Leipzig	Augsburg
20:45 CEST (UTC+2)	Finnbogason 90+4'	Report	Werner 74'; Halstenberg 120+1' (pen.)	Stadium: WWK Arena; Attendance: 25,263; Referee: Tobias Stieler

== Statistics ==
=== Appearances and goals ===
No.	Pos	Nat	Player	Total		Bundesliga		DFB-Pokal	
No.	Pos	Nat	Player	Apps	Goals	Apps	Goals	Apps	Goals
Goalkeepers
1	GK	(Germany) GER	Andreas Luthe	17	0	14+1	0	2	0
13	GK	(Germany) GER	Fabian Giefer	4	0	4	0	0	0
39	GK	(Germany) GER	Benjamin Leneis	0	0	0	0	0	0
40	GK	(Switzerland) SUI	Gregor Kobel	18	0	16	0	2	0
Defenders
3	DF	(Greece) GRE	Kostas Stafylidis	14	0	11+1	0	0+2	0
4	DF	(Germany) GER	Felix Götze	9	1	0+6	1	1+2	0
5	DF	(England) ENG	Reece Oxford	9	0	6+2	0	1	0
6	DF	(Netherlands) NED	Jeffrey Gouweleeuw	28	0	24+1	0	3	0
8	DF	(Germany) GER	Rani Khedira	34	4	30	4	4	0
15	DF	(Croatia) CRO	Jozo Stanić	1	0	0+1	0	0	0
16	DF	(Germany) GER	Christoph Janker	4	0	1+3	0	0	0
18	DF	(Germany) GER	Jan-Ingwer Callsen-Bracker	1	0	0+1	0	0	0
25	DF	(Germany) GER	Kilian Jakob	0	0	0	0	0	0
26	DF	(Germany) GER	Simon Asta	1	0	1	0	0	0
31	DF	(Germany) GER	Philipp Max	34	4	30	4	4	0
32	DF	(Germany) GER	Raphael Framberger	8	0	6+1	0	1	0
38	DF	(Austria) AUT	Kevin Danso	21	1	13+5	1	2+1	0
Midfielders
10	MF	(Germany) GER	Daniel Baier	36	0	33	0	3	0
14	MF	(Czech Republic) CZE	Jan Morávek	14	0	7+6	0	1	0
17	MF	(France) FRA	Jonathan Schmid	29	3	28	3	1	0
19	MF	(South Korea) KOR	Koo Ja-cheol	28	2	19+7	2	2	0
24	MF	(Finland) FIN	Fredrik Jensen	6	0	2+4	0	0	0
28	MF	(Germany) GER	André Hahn	32	5	21+7	4	4	1
34	MF	(Austria) AUT	Georg Teigl	7	0	2+4	0	1	0
Forwards
11	FW	(Austria) AUT	Michael Gregoritsch	36	8	28+4	6	4	2
20	FW	(Germany) GER	Julian Schieber	9	1	3+6	1	0	0
21	FW	(Venezuela) VEN	Sergio Córdova	22	3	3+17	3	1+1	0
22	FW	(South Korea) KOR	Ji Dong-won	16	4	10+4	4	1+1	0
23	FW	(Germany) GER	Marco Richter	29	5	17+8	4	3+1	1
27	FW	(Iceland) ISL	Alfreð Finnbogason	20	11	17+1	10	0+2	1
29	FW	(Germany) GER	Romario Rösch	0	0	0	0	0	0
Players transferred out during the season
36	DF	(Austria) AUT	Martin Hinteregger	20	2	18	2	2	0
30	MF	(Brazil) BRA	Caiuby	16	2	10+4	1	1+1	1

Last updated: 18 May 2019
Source: Competitions
