= 2017–18 FC Augsburg season =

FC Augsburg
2017–18 season
- Chairman: Klaus Hofmann
- Manager: Manuel Baum
- Stadium: WWK Arena
- Bundesliga: 12th
- DFB-Pokal: First round
- Top goalscorer: League: Michael Gregoritsch (13 goals); All: Michael Gregoritsch (13 goals)
- Highest home attendance: 30,660
- Lowest home attendance: 25,971
- Average home league attendance: 28,238
- Biggest win: Augsburg 3–0 Köln; Bremen 0–3 Augsburg; Augsburg 3–0 Frankfurt
- Biggest defeat: Bayern 3–0 Augsburg; Augsburg 1–4 Bayern
| Home colours | Away colours | Third colours |

The 2017–18 FC Augsburg season was the 111th season in the football club's history and 7th consecutive and overall season in the top flight of German football, the Bundesliga, having been promoted from the 2. Bundesliga in 2011. In addition to the domestic league, FC Augsburg also participated in this season's edition of the domestic cup, the DFB-Pokal. This was the 9th season for Augsburg in the WWK Arena, located in Augsburg, Bavaria, Germany. The season covered a period from 1 July 2017 to 30 June 2018.

== Players ==
=== Squad information ===
As of 12 May 2018

Note: Flags indicate national team as defined under FIFA eligibility rules; some limited exceptions apply. Players may hold more than one non-FIFA nationality.

| No. | Pos. | Nation | Player |
|---|---|---|---|
| 1 | GK | (Germany) GER | Andreas Luthe |
| 4 | DF | (Ghana) GHA | Daniel Opare |
| 6 | DF | (Netherlands) NED | Jeffrey Gouweleeuw |
| 7 | MF | (Germany) GER | Marcel Heller |
| 8 | MF | (Germany) GER | Rani Khedira |
| 9 | FW | (Germany) GER | Shawn Parker |
| 10 | MF | (Germany) GER | Daniel Baier (captain) |
| 11 | FW | (Austria) AUT | Michael Gregoritsch |
| 13 | GK | (Germany) GER | Fabian Giefer |
| 14 | MF | (Czech Republic) CZE | Jan Morávek |
| 16 | DF | (Germany) GER | Christoph Janker |
| 17 | MF | (France) FRA | Jonathan Schmid |
| 19 | MF | (South Korea) KOR | Koo Ja-cheol |

| No. | Pos. | Nation | Player |
|---|---|---|---|
| 20 | MF | (Serbia) SRB | Gojko Kačar |
| 21 | MF | (Venezuela) VEN | Sergio Córdova |
| 23 | FW | (Germany) GER | Marco Richter |
| 24 | GK | (Greece) GRE | Ioannis Gelios |
| 25 | DF | (Germany) GER | Kilian Jakob |
| 26 | DF | (Germany) GER | Simon Asta |
| 27 | FW | (Iceland) ISL | Alfreð Finnbogason |
| 30 | MF | (Brazil) BRA | Caiuby |
| 31 | DF | (Germany) GER | Philipp Max |
| 32 | DF | (Germany) GER | Raphael Framberger |
| 35 | GK | (Switzerland) SUI | Marwin Hitz |
| 36 | DF | (Austria) AUT | Martin Hinteregger |
| 38 | DF | (Austria) AUT | Kevin Danso |

=== Transfers ===
==== In ====
| Date | Pos. | Player | From | Fee | Ref. |
|---|---|---|---|---|---|
| 7 June 2017 | DF | Rani Khedira (GER) | RB Leipzig | Free transfer | |
| 8 June 2017 | GK | Fabian Giefer (GER) | Schalke 04 | Undisclosed | |
| 28 June 2017 | MF | Marcel Heller (GER) | Darmstadt 98 | Free transfer | |
| 4 July 2017 | FW | Michael Gregoritsch (AUT) | Hamburger SV | €5,000,000 | |
| 4 July 2017 | FW | Sergio Córdova (VEN) | Caracas F.C. (VEN) | €1,000,000 | |
| 30 August 2017 | DF | Kilian Jakob (GER) | 1860 Munich | Undisclosed | |

==== Out ====
| Date | Pos. | Player | To | Fee | Ref. |
|---|---|---|---|---|---|
| 17 August 2017 | FW | Raúl Bobadilla (PAR) | Borussia Mönchengladbach | Undisclosed | |
| 18 January 2018 | MF | Erik Thommy (GER) | VfB Stuttgart | Undisclosed | |
| 27 January 2018 | DF | Marvin Friedrich (GER) | Union Berlin | Undisclosed | |

==== Loans out ====
| Date from | Pos. | Player | To | Date until | Ref. |
|---|---|---|---|---|---|
| 30 August 2017 | FW | Takashi Usami (JPN) | Fortuna Düsseldorf | End of season | |
| 31 August 2017 | MF | Julian Günther-Schmidt (GER) | Carl Zeiss Jena | End of season | |
| 15 January 2018 | DF | Jan-Ingwer Callsen-Bracker (GER) | 1. FC Kaiserslautern | End of season | |
| 18 January 2018 | DF | Kostas Stafylidis (GRE) | Stoke City (ENG) | End of season | |
| 25 January 2018 | MF | Moritz Leitner (GER) | Norwich City (ENG) | End of season | |

== Competitions ==
Win Draw Loss

=== Overview ===
| Competition | First match | Last match | Starting round | Final position | Record | | | | | | | |
| Competition | First match | Last match | Starting round | Final position | Pld | W | D | L | GF | GA | GD | Win % |
|---|---|---|---|---|---|---|---|---|---|---|---|---|
| Bundesliga | 19 August 2017 | 12 May 2018 | Matchday 1 | | 34 | 10 | 11 | 13 | 43 | 46 | −3 | 29.41 |
| DFB-Pokal | 13 August 2017 | 13 August 2017 | First round | First round | 1 | 0 | 0 | 1 | 0 | 2 | −2 | 0.00 |
| Total | | | | | 35 | 10 | 11 | 14 | 43 | 48 | −5 | 28.57 |

Last updated: 21 May 2018
Source: Competitions

=== Bundesliga ===
==== League table ====
| Pos | Team | Pld | W | D | L | GF | GA | GD | Pts |
|---|---|---|---|---|---|---|---|---|---|
| 10 | Hertha BSC | 34 | 10 | 13 | 11 | 43 | 46 | −3 | 43 |
| 11 | Werder Bremen | 34 | 10 | 12 | 12 | 37 | 40 | −3 | 42 |
| 12 | FC Augsburg | 34 | 10 | 11 | 13 | 43 | 46 | −3 | 41 |
| 13 | Hannover 96 | 34 | 10 | 9 | 15 | 44 | 54 | −10 | 39 |
| 14 | Mainz 05 | 34 | 9 | 9 | 16 | 38 | 52 | −14 | 36 |

Source: DFB
Rules for classification: 1) Points; 2) Goal difference; 3) Goals scored; 4) Head-to-head results; 5) Head-to-head away goals scored; 6) Away goals scored; 7) Play-off.

==== Results summary ====
| Overall | | | | | | | | Home | | | | | | Away | | | | | |
| Pld | W | D | L | GF | GA | GD | Pts | W | D | L | GF | GA | GD | W | D | L | GF | GA | GD |
|---|---|---|---|---|---|---|---|---|---|---|---|---|---|---|---|---|---|---|---|
| 34 | 10 | 11 | 13 | 43 | 46 | −3 | 41 | 6 | 4 | 7 | 24 | 24 | 0 | 4 | 7 | 6 | 19 | 22 | −3 |

Last updated: 21 May 2018.
Source: Bundesliga

==== Results by round ====
| Round | 1 | 2 | 3 | 4 | 5 | 6 | 7 | 8 | 9 | 10 | 11 | 12 | 13 | 14 | 15 | 16 | 17 | 18 | 19 | 20 | 21 | 22 | 23 | 24 | 25 | 26 | 27 | 28 | 29 | 30 | 31 | 32 | 33 | 34 |
|---|---|---|---|---|---|---|---|---|---|---|---|---|---|---|---|---|---|---|---|---|---|---|---|---|---|---|---|---|---|---|---|---|---|---|
| Ground | A | H | H | A | H | A | H | A | H | A | H | A | H | A | H | A | H | H | A | A | H | A | H | A | H | A | H | A | H | A | H | A | H | A |
| Result | L | D | W | W | W | D | L | D | L | W | D | L | W | W | D | L | D | W | L | D | W | L | L | D | L | W | L | D | L | D | W | D | L | L |
| Position | 11 | 12 | 8 | 7 | 5 | 5 | 6 | 8 | 10 | 9 | 10 | 10 | 8 | 7 | 7 | 9 | 9 | 7 | 8 | 8 | 7 | 7 | 8 | 8 | 10 | 8 | 10 | 10 | 11 | 11 | 11 | 11 | 11 | 12 |

Updated to match(es) played on 21 May 2018. Source: Bundesliga
A = Away; H = Home; W = Win; D = Draw; L = Loss

==== Matches ====
| 19 August 2017 1 | Hamburger SV | 1–0 | FC Augsburg | Hamburg |
| 15:30 CEST (UTC+2) | Müller 8' | Report | | Stadium: Volksparkstadion; Attendance: 49,449; Referee: Daniel Siebert |

| 26 August 2017 2 | FC Augsburg | 2–2 | Borussia Mönchengladbach | Augsburg |
| 15:30 CEST (UTC+2) | Finnbogason 1'; Córdova 89' | Report | Zakaria 7'; Wendt 30' | Stadium: WWK Arena; Attendance: 29,243; Referee: Sascha Stegemann |

| 9 September 2017 3 | FC Augsburg | 3–0 | 1. FC Köln | Augsburg |
| 15:30 CEST (UTC+2) | Finnbogason 21', 32' (pen.), 90+4' | Report | | Stadium: WWK Arena; Attendance: 27,510; Referee: Tobias Stieler |

| 16 September 2017 4 | Eintracht Frankfurt | 1–2 | FC Augsburg | Frankfurt |
| 15:30 CEST (UTC+2) | Jović 79' | Report | Max 20'; Caiuby 77' | Stadium: Commerzbank-Arena; Attendance: 46,500; Referee: Christian Dingert |

| 19 September 2017 5 | FC Augsburg | 1–0 | RB Leipzig | Augsburg |
| 20:30 CEST (UTC+2) | Gregoritsch 4' | Report | | Stadium: WWK Arena; Attendance: 26,113; Referee: Daniel Siebert |

| 23 September 2017 6 | VfB Stuttgart | 0–0 | FC Augsburg | Stuttgart |
| 15:30 CEST (UTC+2) | | Report | | Stadium: Mercedes-Benz Arena; Attendance: 55,202; Referee: Harm Osmers |

| 30 September 2017 7 | FC Augsburg | 1–2 | Borussia Dortmund | Augsburg |
| 15:30 CEST (UTC+2) | Caiuby 11' | Report | Yarmolenko 4'; Kagawa 23' | Stadium: WWK Arena; Attendance: 30,660; Referee: Marco Fritz |

| 14 October 2017 8 | 1899 Hoffenheim | 2–2 | FC Augsburg | Sinsheim |
| 15:30 CEST (UTC+2) | Hübner 52'; Uth 85' | Report | Gregoritsch 75'; Vogt 89' (o.g.) | Stadium: Wirsol Rhein-Neckar-Arena; Attendance: 27,014; Referee: Manuel Gräfe |

| 21 October 2017 9 | FC Augsburg | 1–2 | Hannover 96 | Augsburg |
| 15:30 CEST (UTC+2) | Gregoritsch 33' | Report | Füllkrug 76', 89' | Stadium: WWK Arena; Attendance: 25,971; Referee: Sascha Stegemann |

| 29 October 2017 10 | Werder Bremen | 0–3 | FC Augsburg | Bremen |
| 15:30 CET (UTC+1) | | Report | Gregoritsch 40', 61'; Finnbogason 45+2' (pen.) | Stadium: Weser-Stadion; Attendance: 40,500; Referee: Sören Storks |

| 4 November 2017 11 | FC Augsburg | 1–1 | Bayer Leverkusen | Augsburg |
| 15:30 CET (UTC+1) | Danso 49' | Report | Volland 47' | Stadium: WWK Arena; Attendance: 26,133; Referee: Christian Dingert |

| 18 November 2017 12 | Bayern Munich | 3–0 | FC Augsburg | Munich |
| 15:30 CET (UTC+1) | Vidal 31'; Lewandowski 38', 49' | Report | | Stadium: Allianz Arena; Attendance: 75,000; Referee: Markus Schmidt |

| 25 November 2017 13 | FC Augsburg | 2–1 | VfL Wolfsburg | Augsburg |
| 15:30 CET (UTC+1) | Gregoritsch 51'; Finnbogason 78' | Report | Didavi 40' | Stadium: WWK Arena; Attendance: 26,541; Referee: Tobias Stieler |

| 2 December 2017 14 | Mainz 05 | 1–3 | FC Augsburg | Mainz |
| 15:30 CET (UTC+1) | Holtmann 85' | Report | Gregoritsch 22'; Finnbogason 43' (pen.), 86' | Stadium: Opel Arena; Attendance: 25,037; Referee: Frank Willenborg |

| 10 December 2017 15 | FC Augsburg | 1–1 | Hertha BSC | Augsburg |
| 18:00 CET (UTC+1) | Caiuby 74' | Report | Kalou 90+1' | Stadium: WWK Arena; Attendance: 26,641; Referee: Martin Petersen |

| 13 December 2017 16 | Schalke 04 | 3–2 | FC Augsburg | Gelsenkirchen |
| 20:30 CET (UTC+1) | Di Santo 44'; Burgstaller 47'; Caligiuri 83' (pen.) | Report | Caiuby 64'; Gregoritsch 79' (pen.) | Stadium: Veltins-Arena; Attendance: 59,215; Referee: Sven Jablonski |

| 16 December 2017 17 | FC Augsburg | 3–3 | SC Freiburg | Augsburg |
| 15:30 CET (UTC+1) | Finnbogason 1', 90+1', 90+3' | Report | Günter 20'; Petersen 48', 65' | Stadium: WWK Arena; Attendance: 26,345; Referee: Christian Dingert |

| 13 January 2018 18 | FC Augsburg | 1–0 | Hamburger SV | Augsburg |
| 15:30 CET (UTC+1) | Koo 45' | Report | | Stadium: WWK Arena; Attendance: 30,087; Referee: Manuel Gräfe |

| 20 January 2018 19 | Borussia Mönchengladbach | 2–0 | FC Augsburg | Mönchengladbach |
| 15:30 CET (UTC+1) | Ginter 10'; Hazard 90' | Report | | Stadium: Borussia-Park; Attendance: 42,016; Referee: Bibiana Steinhaus |

| 27 January 2018 20 | 1. FC Köln | 1–1 | FC Augsburg | Cologne |
| 15:30 CET (UTC+1) | Jojić 40' | Report | Caiuby 77' | Stadium: RheinEnergieStadion; Attendance: 49,900; Referee: Christian Dingert |

| 4 February 2018 21 | FC Augsburg | 3–0 | Eintracht Frankfurt | Augsburg |
| 15:30 CET (UTC+1) | Koo 19'; Gregoritsch 76'; Richter 89' | Report | | Stadium: WWK Arena; Attendance: 27,188; Referee: Harm Osmers |

| 9 February 2018 22 | RB Leipzig | 2–0 | FC Augsburg | Leipzig |
| 20:30 CET (UTC+1) | Upamecano 17'; Keïta 70' | Report | | Stadium: Red Bull Arena; Attendance: 34,286; Referee: Sven Jablonski |

| 18 February 2018 23 | FC Augsburg | 0–1 | VfB Stuttgart | Augsburg |
| 15:30 CET (UTC+1) | | Report | Gómez 27' | Stadium: WWK Arena; Attendance: 30,007; Referee: Tobias Stieler |

| 26 February 2018 24 | Borussia Dortmund | 1–1 | FC Augsburg | Dortmund |
| 20:30 CET (UTC+1) | Reus 16' | Report | Danso 73' | Stadium: Signal Iduna Park; Attendance: 54,300; Referee: Manuel Gräfe |

| 3 March 2018 25 | FC Augsburg | 0–2 | 1899 Hoffenheim | Augsburg |
| 15:30 CET (UTC+1) | | Report | Kramarić 30'; Gnabry 50' | Stadium: WWK Arena; Attendance: 27,100; Referee: Patrick Ittrich |

| 10 March 2018 26 | Hannover 96 | 1–3 | FC Augsburg | Hanover |
| 15:30 CET (UTC+1) | Sané 37' | Report | Gregoritsch 26', 83'; Kačar 45+2' | Stadium: HDI-Arena; Attendance: 36,500; Referee: Bastian Dankert |

| 17 March 2018 27 | FC Augsburg | 1–3 | Werder Bremen | Augsburg |
| 15:30 CET (UTC+1) | Khedira 63' | Report | Belfodil 5', 40'; Kruse 82' | Stadium: WWK Arena; Attendance: 30,080; Referee: Sascha Stegemann |

| 31 March 2018 28 | Bayer Leverkusen | 0–0 | FC Augsburg | Leverkusen |
| 15:30 CEST (UTC+2) | | Report | | Stadium: BayArena; Attendance: 25,831; Referee: Frank Willenborg |

| 7 April 2018 29 | FC Augsburg | 1–4 | Bayern Munich | Augsburg |
| 15:30 CEST (UTC+2) | Süle 18' (o.g.) | Report | Tolisso 32'; Rodríguez 38'; Robben 62'; Wagner 87' | Stadium: WWK Arena; Attendance: 30,660; Referee: Markus Schmidt |

| 13 April 2018 30 | VfL Wolfsburg | 0–0 | FC Augsburg | Wolfsburg |
| 20:30 CEST (UTC+2) | | Report | | Stadium: Volkswagen Arena; Attendance: 23,512; Referee: Patrick Ittrich |

| 22 April 2018 31 | FC Augsburg | 2–0 | Mainz 05 | Augsburg |
| 15:30 CEST (UTC+2) | Gregoritsch 29'; Finnbogason 90+2' | Report | | Stadium: WWK Arena; Attendance: 29,110; Referee: Frank Willenborg |

| 28 April 2018 32 | Hertha BSC | 2–2 | FC Augsburg | Berlin |
| 15:30 CEST (UTC+2) | Ibišević 84' (pen.); Selke 87' | Report | Gregoritsch 32'; Córdova 61' | Stadium: Olympiastadion Berlin; Attendance: 40,935; Referee: Marco Fritz |

| 5 May 2018 33 | FC Augsburg | 1–2 | Schalke 04 | Augsburg |
| 15:30 CEST (UTC+2) | Max 27' | Report | Kehrer 23', 34' | Stadium: WWK Arena; Attendance: 30,660; Referee: Robert Kampka |

| 12 May 2018 34 | SC Freiburg | 2–0 | FC Augsburg | Freiburg |
| 15:30 CEST (UTC+2) | Höfler 49'; Kleindienst 65' | Report | | Stadium: Schwarzwald-Stadion; Attendance: 24,000; Referee: Bastian Dankert |

=== DFB-Pokal ===
| 13 August 2017 First round | 1. FC Magdeburg | 2–0 | FC Augsburg | Magdeburg |
| 18:30 CEST (UTC+2) | Beck 87'; Schwede 90+1' | Report | | Stadium: MDCC-Arena; Attendance: 21,641; Referee: Manuel Gräfe |
