= 2019–20 FC Augsburg season =

FC Augsburg
2019–20 season
- Chairman: Klaus Hofmann
- Head coach: Martin Schmidt (until 9 March); Heiko Herrlich (from 10 March)
- Stadium: WWK Arena
- Bundesliga: 15th
- DFB-Pokal: First round
- Top goalscorer: League: Florian Niederlechner (13); All: Florian Niederlechner (13)
Home colours	Away colours	Third colours

The 2019–20 season was FC Augsburg's 121st season in existence and the club's 9th consecutive season in the top flight of German football. In addition to the domestic league, FC Augsburg participated in this season's edition of the DFB-Pokal. The season covered a period from 1 July 2019 to 30 June 2020.

== Players ==
=== Current squad ===
As of 31 January 2020

Note: Flags indicate national team as defined under FIFA eligibility rules; some limited exceptions apply. Players may hold more than one non-FIFA nationality.

No.	Pos.	Nation	Player
1	GK	GER	Andreas Luthe
2	DF	SUI	Stephan Lichtsteiner
4	MF	GER	Felix Götze
5	DF	CZE	Marek Suchý
6	DF	NED	Jeffrey Gouweleeuw
7	FW	GER	Florian Niederlechner
8	MF	GER	Rani Khedira
9	FW	VEN	Sergio Córdova
10	MF	GER	Daniel Baier
13	GK	GER	Fabian Giefer
14	MF	CZE	Jan Morávek
15	DF	CRO	Jozo Stanić
16	MF	SUI	Ruben Vargas
17	FW	NGR	Noah Sarenren Bazee
18	DF	CRO	Tin Jedvaj (on loan from Bayer Leverkusen)
19	DF	GER	Felix Uduokhai (on loan from VfL Wolfsburg)

No.	Pos.	Nation	Player
20	FW	GER	Julian Schieber
21	GK	CZE	Tomáš Koubek
22	DF	BRA	Iago
23	MF	GER	Marco Richter
24	MF	FIN	Fredrik Jensen
25	MF	ECU	Carlos Gruezo
26	DF	GER	Simon Asta
27	FW	ISL	Alfreð Finnbogason
28	MF	GER	André Hahn
29	MF	GER	Eduard Löwen (on loan from Hertha BSC)
31	DF	GER	Philipp Max
32	DF	GER	Raphael Framberger
34	MF	AUT	Georg Teigl
35	FW	KOR	Cheon Seong-hoon
36	DF	ENG	Reece Oxford
37	FW	GER	Maurice Malone
39	GK	GER	Benjamin Leneis

=== Out on loan ===
Note: Flags indicate national team as defined under FIFA eligibility rules; some limited exceptions apply. Players may hold more than one non-FIFA nationality.

No.	Pos.	Nation	Player
—	DF	AUT	Kevin Danso (at Southampton until 30 June 2020)
—	DF	GER	Tim Rieder (at 1860 Munich until 30 June 2020)
—	FW	AUT	Michael Gregoritsch (at Schalke 04 until 30 June 2020)
—	DF	DEN	Mads Valentin (at FC Zürich until 30 June 2020)

== Transfers ==
=== Transfers in ===
#	Position	Player	Transferred from	Fee	Date	Source
7	FW	(Germany) Florian Niederlechner	(Germany) SC Freiburg	€2,500,000	29 May 2019	
17	FW	(Nigeria) Noah Sarenren Bazee	(Germany) Hannover 96	€1,700,000	18 June 2019	
16	DF	(Switzerland) Ruben Vargas	(Switzerland) Luzern	€2,700,000	18 June 2019	
22	DF	(Brazil) Iago	(Brazil) Internacional	€6,500,000	23 June 2019	
3	DF	(Denmark) Mads Valentin	(Denmark) FC Nordsjælland	€800,000	27 June 2019	
25	MF	(Ecuador) Carlos Gruezo	(United States) FC Dallas	€4,000,000	2 July 2019	
5	DF	(Czech Republic) Marek Suchý	(Switzerland) FC Basel	Free	8 July 2019	
36	DF	(England) Reece Oxford	(England) West Ham United	€2,000,000	2 August 2019	
21	GK	(Czech Republic) Tomáš Koubek	(France) Rennes	€7,500,000	6 August 2019	
2	DF	(Switzerland) Stephan Lichtsteiner	(England) Arsenal	Free	19 August 2019	

==== Loans in ====
#	Position	Player	Loaned from	Date	Loan expires	Source
18	DF	(Croatia) Tin Jedvaj	(Germany) Bayer Leverkusen	20 August 2019	30 June 2020	
19	DF	(Germany) Felix Uduokhai	(Germany) VfL Wolfsburg	28 August 2019	30 June 2020	
29	MF	(Germany) Eduard Löwen	(Germany) Hertha BSC	5 January 2020	30 June 2021	

=== Transfers out ===
#	Position	Player	Transferred to	Fee	Date	Source
22	FW	(South Korea) Ji Dong-won	(Germany) Mainz 05	Free	6 May 2019	
3	DF	(Greece) Kostas Stafylidis	(Germany) 1899 Hoffenheim	Free	15 May 2019	
17	MF	(France) Jonathan Schmid	(Germany) SC Freiburg	€4,000,000	31 May 2019	
16	DF	(Germany) Christoph Janker		Free	1 July 2019	
	FW	(Germany) Julian Günther-Schmidt	(Germany) Carl Zeiss Jena	Undisclosed	1 July 2019	
	FW	(Japan) Takashi Usami	(Japan) Gamba Osaka	Undisclosed	1 July 2019	
19	MF	(South Korea) Koo Ja-cheol	(Qatar) Al-Gharafa	Free	2 August 2019	
36	DF	(Austria) Martin Hinteregger	(Germany) Eintracht Frankfurt	€9,000,000	9 August 2019	
30	MF	(Brazil) Caiuby		Free	30 October 2019	

==== Loans out ====
#	Position	Player	Loaned to	Date	Loan expires	Source
38	DF	(Austria) Kevin Danso	(England) Southampton	9 August 2019	30 June 2020	
	DF	(Germany) Tim Rieder	(Germany) 1860 Munich	2 September 2019	30 June 2020	
11	FW	(Austria) Michael Gregoritsch	(Germany) Schalke 04	1 January 2020	30 June 2020	
3	DF	(Denmark) Mads Valentin	(Switzerland) Zürich	30 January 2020	30 June 2020	

== Pre-season and friendlies ==
Win Draw Loss

9 July 2019 Friendly	FC Augsburg	6–0	Gundelfingen	Jettingen-Scheppach, Germany
18:00 CEST (UTC+2)	Vargas 18'; Niederlechner 21', 26'; Cevis 47'; Hahn 56'; Petkov 66'	Report		Stadium: Sportpark VfR Jettingen; Attendance: 2,000

13 July 2019 Friendly	FC Augsburg	1–0	Greuther Fürth	Heimstetten, Germany
16:00 CEST (UTC+2)				Stadium: Sportpark Heimstetten

25 July 2019 Friendly	FC Augsburg	4–1	Galatasaray	Innsbruck, Austria
19:00 CEST (UTC+2)	Niederlechner 14'; Gruezo 31'; Hahn 53'; Russo 54'	Report	Bayram 87'	Stadium: Tivoli-Neu; Attendance: 2,230

26 July 2019 Friendly	FC Augsburg	2–6	Villarreal	Schwaz, Austria
18:00 CEST (UTC+2)	Max 33'; Malone 87' (pen.)	Report	Raba 11', 23'; Iborra 15'; Moreno 60'; Bacca 63'; Niño 78'	Stadium: Silberstadt Arena; Attendance: 2,000

3 August 2019 Friendly	FC Augsburg	2–3	Bologna	Augsburg, Germany
15:30 CEST (UTC+2)	Gregoritsch 25' (pen.); Richter 50'	Report	Destro 6'; Svanberg 74'; Santander 84'	Stadium: WWK Arena; Attendance: 12,153; Referee: Tobias Schultes (Germany)

14 November 2019 Friendly	Bayern Munich II	1–4	FC Augsburg	Munich, Germany
15:00 CET (UTC+1)	Köhn 61'	Report	Schieber 28' (pen.); Valentin 31'; Sarenren Bazee 34', 38'	Stadium: FC Bayern Campus

9 January 2020 Friendly	Hibernians	0–4	FC Augsburg	Ta' Qali, Malta
15:00 CET (UTC+1)		Report	Sarenren Bazee 28'; Löwen 49'; Schieber 67', 71'	Stadium: National Stadium; Attendance: 50

10 January 2020 Friendly	Cercle Brugge	3–3	FC Augsburg	Ta' Qali, Malta
15:00 CET (UTC+1)	Hoggas 12'; Christie-Davies 68'; Vitinho 74'	Report	Khedira 33'; Lichtsteiner (yellow card) 39'; Jedvaj (yellow card) 42'; Jensen 52', 84'	Stadium: National Stadium; Attendance: 50

== Competitions ==
Win Draw Loss

=== Overview ===
Competition	First match	Last match	Starting round	Final position	Record							
Competition	First match	Last match	Starting round	Final position	Pld	W	D	L	GF	GA	GD	Win %
Bundesliga	17 August 2019	27 June 2020	Matchday 1	15th	34	9	9	16	45	63	−18	26.47
DFB-Pokal	10 August 2019		First round	First round	1	0	0	1	1	2	−1	0.00
Total					35	9	9	17	46	65	−19	25.71

Last updated: 27 June 2020
Source: Soccerway

=== Bundesliga ===
==== League table ====
Pos	Team	Pld	W	D	L	GF	GA	GD	Pts	Qualification or relegation
13	Mainz 05	34	11	4	19	44	65	−21	37	
14	1. FC Köln	34	10	6	18	51	69	−18	36	
15	FC Augsburg	34	9	9	16	45	63	−18	36	
16	Werder Bremen (O)	34	8	7	19	42	69	−27	31	Qualification for the relegation play-offs
17	Fortuna Düsseldorf (R)	34	6	12	16	36	67	−31	30	Relegation to 2. Bundesliga

Source: DFB
Rules for classification: 1) Points; 2) Goal difference; 3) Goals scored; 4) Head-to-head results; 5) Head-to-head away goals scored; 6) Away goals scored; 7) Play-off.
(O) Play-off winners; (R) Relegated

==== Results summary ====
Overall								Home						Away					
Pld	W	D	L	GF	GA	GD	Pts	W	D	L	GF	GA	GD	W	D	L	GF	GA	GD
34	9	9	16	45	63	−18	36	5	5	7	28	29	−1	4	4	9	17	34	−17

Last updated: 27 June 2020.
Source: Bundesliga

==== Results by round ====
Round	1	2	3	4	5	6	7	8	9	10	11	12	13	14	15	16	17	18	19	20	21	22	23	24	25	26	27	28	29	30	31	32	33	34
Ground	A	H	A	H	A	H	A	H	A	H	A	H	A	H	A	A	H	H	A	H	A	H	A	H	A	H	A	H	A	H	A	H	H	A
Result	L	D	L	W	D	L	L	D	D	L	W	W	D	W	W	W	L	L	L	W	L	D	L	L	L	L	W	D	L	D	W	L	D	L
Position	17	13	16	14	12	14	14	16	17	16	15	12	14	12	11	10	10	10	12	10	11	11	12	14	14	14	12	12	13	13	13	14	15	15

Updated to match(es) played on 27 June 2020. Source: Bundesliga
A = Away; H = Home; W = Win; D = Draw; L = Loss

==== Matches ====
The Bundesliga schedule was announced on 28 June 2019.

17 August 2019 1	Borussia Dortmund	5–1	FC Augsburg	Dortmund
15:30 CEST (UTC+2)	Alcácer 3', 59'; Sancho 51'; Reus 57'; Brandt 82'	Report	Niederlechner 1'	Stadium: Signal Iduna Park; Attendance: 81,365; Referee: Frank Willenborg

24 August 2019 2	FC Augsburg	1–1	Union Berlin	Augsburg
15:30 CEST (UTC+2)	Vargas 59'	Report	Andersson 80'; Schlotterbeck (red card) 84'	Stadium: WWK Arena; Attendance: 27,704; Referee: Robert Schröder

1 September 2019 3	Werder Bremen	3–2	FC Augsburg	Bremen
15:30 CEST (UTC+2)	Osako 6', 67'; Sargent 21'; Pavlenka (yellow card) 90+2'	Report	Vargas 12', 46', (yellow card) 26'; Lichtsteiner (yellow card) 23' (yellow-red card) 34'; Niederlechner (yellow card) 90'	Stadium: Weser-Stadion; Attendance: 40,041; Referee: Sören Storks

14 September 2019 4	FC Augsburg	2–1	Eintracht Frankfurt	Augsburg
15:30 CEST (UTC+2)	Richter 35'; Niederlechner 43'; Koubek (yellow card) 80'; Hahn (yellow card) 90'	Report	Hinteregger (yellow card) 39'; Paciência 73'	Stadium: WWK Arena; Attendance: 28,513; Referee: Harm Osmers

21 September 2019 5	SC Freiburg	1–1	FC Augsburg	Freiburg
15:30 CEST (UTC+2)	Frantz (yellow card) 12'; Höler 23'	Report	Niederlechner 39'; Finnbogason (yellow card) 90'	Stadium: Schwarzwald-Stadion; Attendance: 23,800; Referee: Bastian Dankert

28 September 2019 6	FC Augsburg	0–3	Bayer Leverkusen	Augsburg
15:30 CEST (UTC+2)	Max (yellow card) 19'; Lichtsteiner (yellow card) 45+1'; Vargas (yellow card) 63'; Schieber (yellow card) 75'	Report	Niederlechner 34' (o.g.); Volland 76'; Havertz 84'	Stadium: WWK Arena; Attendance: 27,113; Referee: Robert Kampka

6 October 2019 7	Borussia Mönchengladbach	5–1	FC Augsburg	Mönchengladbach
13:30 CEST (UTC+2)	Zakaria 2'; Herrmann 8', 13', (yellow card) 28'; Pléa 39'; Embolo 83'	Report	Khedira (yellow card) 34'; Framberger (yellow card) 62'; Niederlechner 80'	Stadium: Borussia-Park; Attendance: 50,352; Referee: Robert Schröder

19 October 2019 8	FC Augsburg	2–2	Bayern Munich	Augsburg
15:30 CEST (UTC+2)	Richter 1', (yellow card) 63'; Khedira (yellow card) 73'; Finnbogason 90+2'; Koubek (yellow card) 90+4'	Report	Lewandowski 14'; Kimmich (yellow card) 37'; Thiago (yellow card) 42'; Gnabry 49'	Stadium: WWK Arena; Attendance: 30,660; Referee: Daniel Siebert

27 October 2019 9	VfL Wolfsburg	0–0	FC Augsburg	Wolfsburg
15:30 CET (UTC+1)		Report		Stadium: Volkswagen Arena; Attendance: 22,630; Referee: Tobias Stieler

3 November 2019 10	FC Augsburg	2–3	Schalke 04	Augsburg
18:00 CET (UTC+1)	Baier 38', (yellow card) 70'; Finnbogason 60' (pen.); Khedira (yellow card) 90'; Vargas (yellow card) 90+5'	Report	Caligiuri (yellow card) 23'; Mascarell (yellow card) 35'; Lichtsteiner 45+1' (o.g.); McKennie (yellow card) 57'; Kabak 71'; Harit 82'; Schöpf (yellow card) 90+3'; Nübel (yellow card) 90+5'	Stadium: WWK Arena; Attendance: 30,361; Referee: Patrick Ittrich

9 November 2019 11	SC Paderborn	0–1	FC Augsburg	Paderborn
15:30 CET (UTC+1)	Collins (yellow card) 84'	Report	Max 41', (yellow card) 90'; Jedvaj (yellow card) 67'; Morávek (yellow card) 88'	Stadium: Benteler-Arena; Attendance: 13,758; Referee: Marco Fritz

24 November 2019 12	FC Augsburg	4–0	Hertha BSC	Augsburg
15:30 CET (UTC+1)	Max 17'; Córdova 26'; Hahn 52'; Niederlechner 79'	Report	Grujić (yellow card) 24'; Jarstein (red card) 28'; Stark (yellow card) 76'	Stadium: WWK Arena; Attendance: 29,233; Referee: Sascha Stegemann

30 November 2019 13	1. FC Köln	1–1	FC Augsburg	Cologne
15:30 CET (UTC+1)	Czichos (yellow card) 8' (yellow-red card) 39'; Verstraete (yellow card) 17'; Höger (yellow card) 20'; Drexler (yellow card) 45+4'; Hector (yellow card) 62'; Córdoba 86', (yellow card) 87'; Bornauw (yellow card) 90+3'	Report	Hahn (yellow card) 23' (yellow-red card) 44'; Niederlechner 43'; Max (yellow card) 45+1'	Stadium: RheinEnergieStadion; Attendance: 49,200; Referee: Tobias Stieler

7 December 2019 14	FC Augsburg	2–1	Mainz 05	Augsburg
15:30 CET (UTC+1)	Vargas (yellow card) 28'; Richter 41'; Niederlechner 65' (pen.); Jedvaj (yellow card) 88'	Report	Öztunalı 15'; Fernandes (yellow card) 44'; Quaison (yellow card) 59'	Stadium: WWK Arena; Attendance: 26,950; Referee: Markus Schmidt

13 December 2019 15	1899 Hoffenheim	2–4	FC Augsburg	Sinsheim
20:30 CET (UTC+1)	Samassekou (yellow card) 7'; Skov 14'; Locadia 80'	Report	Max 11', 51' (pen.); Jensen 56'; Iago 85'	Stadium: PreZero Arena; Attendance: 23,309; Referee: Bibiana Steinhaus

17 December 2019 16	FC Augsburg	3–0	Fortuna Düsseldorf	Augsburg
20:30 CET (UTC+1)	Max 32', 72'; Khedira (yellow card) 46'; Jedvaj 61'; Lichtsteiner (yellow card) 87'; Vargas (yellow card) 90'	Report	Gießelmann (yellow card) 34'; Morales (yellow card) 40'; Ampomah (yellow card) 52'; Tekpetey (yellow card) 86'	Stadium: WWK Arena; Attendance: 27,763; Referee: Marco Fritz

21 December 2019 17	RB Leipzig	3–1	FC Augsburg	Leipzig
15:30 CET (UTC+1)	Laimer 68'; Schick 80', (yellow card) 80'; Poulsen 90'	Report	Niederlechner 8'; Uduokhai (yellow card) 44'; Baier (yellow card) 68'; Vargas (yellow card) 72'	Stadium: Red Bull Arena; Attendance: 40,562; Referee: Daniel Siebert

18 January 2020 18	FC Augsburg	3–5	Borussia Dortmund	Augsburg
15:30 CET (UTC+1)	Niederlechner 34', 55'; Richter 46'	Report	Brandt 49', (yellow card) 77'; Haaland 59', 70', 79'; Sancho 61'	Stadium: WWK Arena; Attendance: 30,660; Referee: Manuel Gräfe

25 January 2020 19	Union Berlin	2–0	FC Augsburg	Berlin
15:30 CET (UTC+1)	Subotić 47', (yellow card) 68'; Ingvartsen 61'; Schlotterbeck (yellow card) 67'; Gentner (yellow card) 70'; Andrich (yellow card) 74'	Report	Gouweleeuw (yellow card) 45+1'	Stadium: Stadion An der Alten Försterei; Attendance: 22,012; Referee: Bibiana Steinhaus

1 February 2020 20	FC Augsburg	2–1	Werder Bremen	Augsburg
15:30 CET (UTC+1)	Niederlechner 67'; Baier (yellow card) 76'; Vargas 82'; Max (yellow card) 88'	Report	Jedvaj 23' (o.g.); Eggestein (yellow card) 48'; Toprak (yellow card) 66'; Bartels (yellow card) 69'; Bittencourt (yellow card) 74'; Selke (yellow card) 90'	Stadium: WWK Arena; Attendance: 29,432; Referee: Marco Fritz

7 February 2020 21	Eintracht Frankfurt	5–0	FC Augsburg	Frankfurt
20:30 CET (UTC+1)	Chandler 37', 48'; Silva 55'; Ndicka (yellow card) 67'; Kostić 89', 90'	Report		Stadium: Commerzbank-Arena; Attendance: 48,800; Referee: Manuel Gräfe

15 February 2020 22	FC Augsburg	1–1	SC Freiburg	Augsburg
15:30 CET (UTC+1)	Max 38'; Baier (yellow card) 50'; Richter (yellow card) 55'; Gouweleeuw (yellow card) 80'; Khedira (yellow card) 88'	Report	Haberer 51'; Abrashi (yellow card) 59'	Stadium: WWK Arena; Attendance: 26,822; Referee: Patrick Ittrich

23 February 2020 23	Bayer Leverkusen	2–0	FC Augsburg	Leverkusen
15:30 CET (UTC+1)	Tapsoba (yellow card) 20'; Diaby 25'; Amiri 59'; Wendell (yellow card) 62'	Report	Khedira (yellow card) 15'; Gouweleeuw (yellow card) 20'; Jedvaj (yellow card) 32'; Baier (yellow card) 72'	Stadium: BayArena; Attendance: 23,703; Referee: Sven Jablonski

29 February 2020 24	FC Augsburg	2–3	Borussia Mönchengladbach	Augsburg
15:30 CET (UTC+1)	Lichtsteiner (yellow card) 1'; Gouweleeuw (yellow card) 32'; Löwen 57'; Finnbogason 83'	Report	Bensebaini (yellow card) 12', (goal) 49'; Stindl 53', 79'; Ginter (yellow card) 76'	Stadium: WWK Arena; Attendance: 29,303; Referee: Markus Schmidt

8 March 2020 25	Bayern Munich	2–0	FC Augsburg	Munich
15:30 CET (UTC+1)	Müller 53'; Thiago (yellow card) 85'; Goretzka 90+1'	Report		Stadium: Allianz Arena; Attendance: 75,000; Referee: Bibiana Steinhaus

16 May 2020 26	FC Augsburg	1–2	VfL Wolfsburg	Augsburg
15:30 CEST (UTC+2)	Suchý (yellow card) 39'; Jedvaj 54'	Report	Steffen 43'; Otávio (yellow card) 53'; Arnold (yellow card) 73'; Ginczek 90+1'; Roussillon (yellow card) 90+3'	Stadium: WWK Arena; Attendance: 0 Referee: Felix Brych
Note: The match was postponed on 13 March due to the pandemic of COVID-19 in Germany, and rescheduled to 16 May.

24 May 2020 27	Schalke 04	0–3	FC Augsburg	Gelsenkirchen
13:30 CEST (UTC+2)		Report	Löwen 6'; Vargas (yellow card) 8'; Gruezo (yellow card) 60'; Sarenren Bazee 76'; Córdova 90+1'	Stadium: Veltins-Arena; Attendance: 0 Referee: Sascha Stegemann
Note: The match was postponed on 13 March due to the pandemic of COVID-19 in Germany, and rescheduled to 24 May.

27 May 2020 28	FC Augsburg	0–0	SC Paderborn	Augsburg
20:30 CEST (UTC+2)	Gouweleeuw (yellow card) 84'	Report	Gjasula (yellow card) 52'	Stadium: WWK Arena; Attendance: 0 Referee: Deniz Aytekin
Note: The match was postponed on 24 March due to the pandemic of COVID-19 in Germany, and rescheduled to 27 May.

30 May 2020 29	Hertha BSC	2–0	FC Augsburg	Berlin
15:30 CEST (UTC+2)	Grujić (yellow card) 20'; Dilrosun 23'; Mittelstädt (yellow card) 37'; Piątek (yellow card) 87', (goal) 90+3'	Report	Khedira (yellow card) 9'; Uduokhai (yellow card) 71'; Baier (yellow card) 75'	Stadium: Olympiastadion; Attendance: 0 Referee: Sven Jablonski
Note: The match was postponed on 24 March due to the pandemic of COVID-19 in Germany, and rescheduled to 30 May.

7 June 2020 30	FC Augsburg	1–1	1. FC Köln	Augsburg
18:00 CEST (UTC+2)	Framberger (yellow card) 51'; Max 88'	Report	Schmitz (yellow card) 15'; Uth (yellow card) 25'; Modeste 86'; Hector (yellow card) 90'	Stadium: WWK Arena; Attendance: 0 Referee: Benjamin Cortus
Note: The match was postponed on 24 March due to the pandemic of COVID-19 in Germany, and rescheduled to 7 June.

14 June 2020 31	Mainz 05	0–1	FC Augsburg	Mainz
15:30 CEST (UTC+2)	Barreiro (yellow card) 41'; Fernandes (yellow card) 90+3'	Report	Niederlechner 1'; Uduokhai (yellow card) 45'; Gruezo (yellow card) 45+2'; Sarenren Bazee (yellow card) 62'; Framberger (yellow card) 68'	Stadium: Opel Arena; Attendance: 0 Referee: Marco Fritz
Note: The match was postponed on 24 March due to the pandemic of COVID-19 in Germany, and rescheduled to 14 June.

17 June 2020 32	FC Augsburg	1–3	1899 Hoffenheim	Augsburg
20:30 CEST (UTC+2)	Vargas 69'; Jedvaj (yellow card) 81'; Hahn (yellow card) 90+2'	Report	Dabbur (yellow card) 46', (goal) 59', 62'; Bebou 89'	Stadium: WWK Arena; Attendance: 0 Referee: Deniz Aytekin
Note: The match was postponed on 24 March due to the pandemic of COVID-19 in Germany, and rescheduled to 17 June.

20 June 2020 33	Fortuna Düsseldorf	1–1	FC Augsburg	Düsseldorf
15:30 CEST (UTC+2)	Hennings 25'; Gießelmann (yellow card) 79'	Report	Niederlechner 10'	Stadium: Merkur Spiel-Arena; Attendance: 0 Referee: Daniel Siebert
Note: The match was postponed on 24 March due to the pandemic of COVID-19 in Germany, and rescheduled to 20 June.

27 June 2020 34	FC Augsburg	1–2	RB Leipzig	Augsburg
15:30 CEST (UTC+2)	Gruezo (yellow card) 45+2'; Hahn (yellow card) 52'; Jedvaj (yellow card) 67'; Max (yellow card) 68'; Vargas 72'	Report	Werner 28', 82'; Mukiele (yellow card) 71'	Stadium: WWK Arena; Attendance: 0 Referee: Felix Brych
Note: The match was postponed on 7 May due to the pandemic of COVID-19 in Germany, and rescheduled to 27 June.

=== DFB-Pokal ===
10 August 2019 First round	SC Verl	2–1	FC Augsburg	Verl
15:30 CEST (UTC+2)	Suchý 8' (o.g.); Schallenberg 23', (yellow card) 80'; Yıldırım (yellow card) 63'; Schöppner (yellow card) 90'	Report	Suchý (yellow card) 74'; Hahn 83' (pen.); Gruezo (yellow card) 90'	Stadium: Sportclub Arena; Attendance: 4,198; Referee: Matthias Jöllenbeck

== Statistics ==
=== Appearances and goals ===
No.	Pos	Nat	Player	Total		Bundesliga		DFB-Pokal	
No.	Pos	Nat	Player	Apps	Goals	Apps	Goals	Apps	Goals
Goalkeepers
1	GK	(Germany) GER	Andreas Luthe	10	0	10	0	0	0
13	GK	(Germany) GER	Fabian Giefer	0	0	0	0	0	0
21	GK	(Czech Republic) CZE	Tomáš Koubek	25	0	24	0	1	0
39	GK	(Germany) GER	Benjamin Leneis	0	0	0	0	0	0
Defenders
2	DF	(Switzerland) SUI	Stephan Lichtsteiner	20	0	17+3	0	0	0
5	DF	(Czech Republic) CZE	Marek Suchý	8	0	4+3	0	1	0
6	DF	(Netherlands) NED	Jeffrey Gouweleeuw	21	0	18+3	0	0	0
15	DF	(Croatia) CRO	Jozo Stanić	0	0	0	0	0	0
18	DF	(Croatia) CRO	Tin Jedvaj	31	2	30+1	2	0	0
19	DF	(Germany) GER	Felix Uduokhai	26	0	21+5	0	0	0
22	DF	(Brazil) BRA	Iago	10	1	7+3	1	0	0
26	DF	(Germany) GER	Simon Asta	0	0	0	0	0	0
31	DF	(Germany) GER	Philipp Max	31	8	31	8	0	0
32	DF	(Germany) GER	Raphael Framberger	18	0	12+6	0	0	0
36	DF	(England) ENG	Reece Oxford	12	0	2+10	0	0	0
Midfielders
4	MF	(Germany) GER	Felix Götze	0	0	0	0	0	0
8	MF	(Germany) GER	Rani Khedira	33	0	32	0	0+1	0
10	MF	(Germany) GER	Daniel Baier	24	1	22+1	1	1	0
14	MF	(Czech Republic) CZE	Jan Morávek	11	0	4+7	0	0	0
16	MF	(Switzerland) SUI	Ruben Vargas	33	6	29+4	6	0	0
23	MF	(Germany) GER	Marco Richter	32	4	26+5	4	1	0
24	MF	(Finland) FIN	Fredrik Jensen	11	1	5+5	1	0+1	0
25	MF	(Ecuador) ECU	Carlos Gruezo	12	0	10+1	0	1	0
28	MF	(Germany) GER	André Hahn	16	2	8+7	1	1	1
29	MF	(Germany) GER	Eduard Löwen	16	2	7+9	2	0	0
34	MF	(Austria) AUT	Georg Teigl	4	0	1+2	0	1	0
Forwards
7	FW	(Germany) GER	Florian Niederlechner	34	13	31+2	13	1	0
9	FW	(Venezuela) VEN	Sergio Córdova	16	2	4+12	2	0	0
17	FW	(Nigeria) NGR	Noah Sarenren Bazee	10	1	4+6	1	0	0
20	FW	(Germany) GER	Julian Schieber	3	0	0+2	0	0+1	0
27	FW	(Iceland) ISL	Alfreð Finnbogason	21	3	10+11	3	0	0
35	FW	(South Korea) KOR	Cheon Seong-hoon	0	0	0	0	0	0
37	FW	(Germany) GER	Maurice Malone	0	0	0	0	0	0
Players transferred out during the season
3	DF	(Denmark) DEN	Mads Valentin	3	0	1+1	0	1	0
11	FW	(Austria) AUT	Michael Gregoritsch	1	0	0	0	1	0
30	MF	(Brazil) BRA	Caiuby	0	0	0	0	0	0
40	DF	(Germany) GER	Tim Rieder	1	0	0	0	1	0

Last updated: 27 June 2020
Source: Competitions
