= Philipp Max =

German footballer (born 1993)

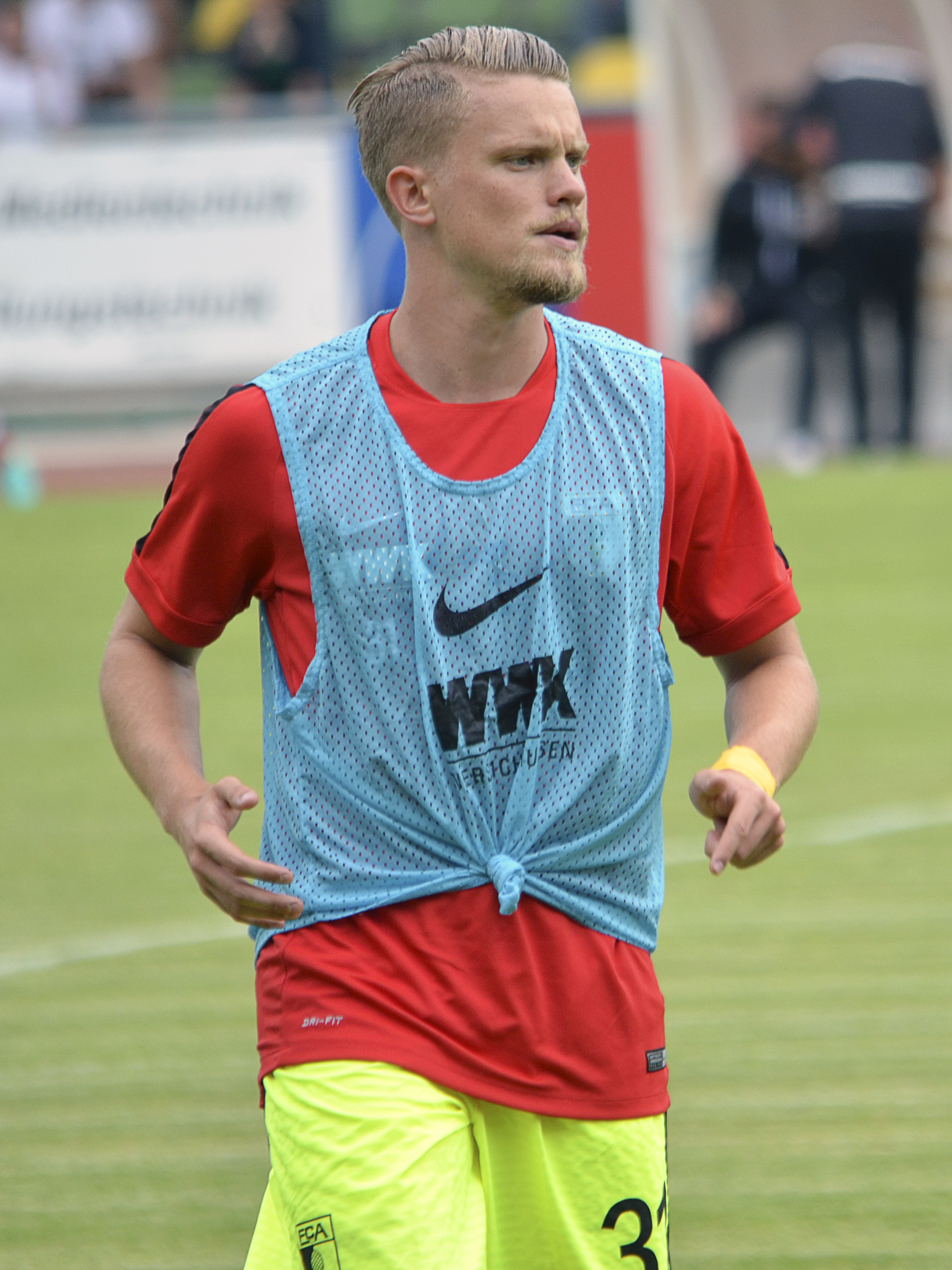
- Max training with FC Augsburg in 2016

Personal information
- Full name: Philipp Martin Max
- Date of birth: 30 September 1993 (age 33)
- Place of birth: Viersen, Germany
- Height: 1.78 m (5 ft 10 in)
- Position: Left-back

Youth career
- 2000–2003: SC Baldham
- 2003–2007: 1860 Munich
- 2007–2010: Bayern Munich
- 2010–2012: Schalke 04

Senior career*
Years	Team	Apps	(Gls)
2012–2014	Schalke 04 II	54	(3)
2014	Schalke 04	2	(0)
2014–2015	Karlsruher SC	23	(0)
2015–2020	FC Augsburg	145	(15)
2020–2023	PSV	70	(6)
2023	→ Eintracht Frankfurt (loan)	10	(0)
2023–2024	Eintracht Frankfurt	23	(1)
2024–2026	Panathinaikos	9	(0)
2026	Gamba Osaka	0	(0)
Total		336	(25)

International career
2016	Germany Olympic	3	(1)
2020	Germany	3	(0)
Medal record
Olympic Games
Silver medal – second place	2016 Rio de Janeiro	Team
- * Club domestic league appearances and goals

Philipp Martin Max (German pronunciation: [ˈfiːlɪp ˈmaks]; born 30 September 1993) is a German former professional footballer who played as a left-back.

== Club career ==
=== Schalke 04 ===
Max joined Schalke 04 in 2010 from Bayern Munich. He made his Bundesliga debut on 25 March 2014 against Borussia Dortmund, coming in for Julian Draxler.

=== Karlsruher SC ===
On 30 April 2014, Max signed a three-year contract with Karlsruher SC, effective the following season.

=== FC Augsburg ===
On 4 August 2015, Max joined fellow German club FC Augsburg on a two-year contract with an option to extend the agreement, for a reported fee of €3.6 million. He scored his first goal for Augsburg in a 4–0 victory over Hamburger SV in the Bundesliga on 30 April 2017. He finished the 2017–18 Bundesliga season with 2 goals and 12 assists for Augsburg With 12 assists, he became the 2nd top assist provider in the league only behind Bayern's Thomas Müller who had 14 assists. In December 2018, in a 2–2 draw with Hertha BSC, he made his 100th league appearance for Augsburg. On 13 December 2019, Max scored a brace away at Hoffenheim while playing on the left wing, as regular winger Ruben Vargas was serving a one-game suspension. Max scored another brace in their next game, a win over Fortuna Düsseldorf, also while on the wing.

=== PSV Eindhoven ===
On 2 September 2020, Max joined PSV Eindhoven.

=== Eintracht Frankfurt ===
On 31 January 2023, Max moved to Eintracht Frankfurt on loan with an option to buy. On 26 May, Eintracht activated their option to buy and made the transfer permanent, signing a three-year contract with Max.

=== Panathinaikos ===
On 6 August 2024, Max signed a three-year contract with Panathinaikos in Greece.

=== Gamba Osaka and retirement ===
On 12 March 2026, Max transferred to J1 League club Gamba Osaka. On 30 April, his contract was terminated by mutual consent due to fitness concerns, without Max making a single appearance for the club.

On 16 August 2026, Max retired from professional football aged 32.

== International career ==
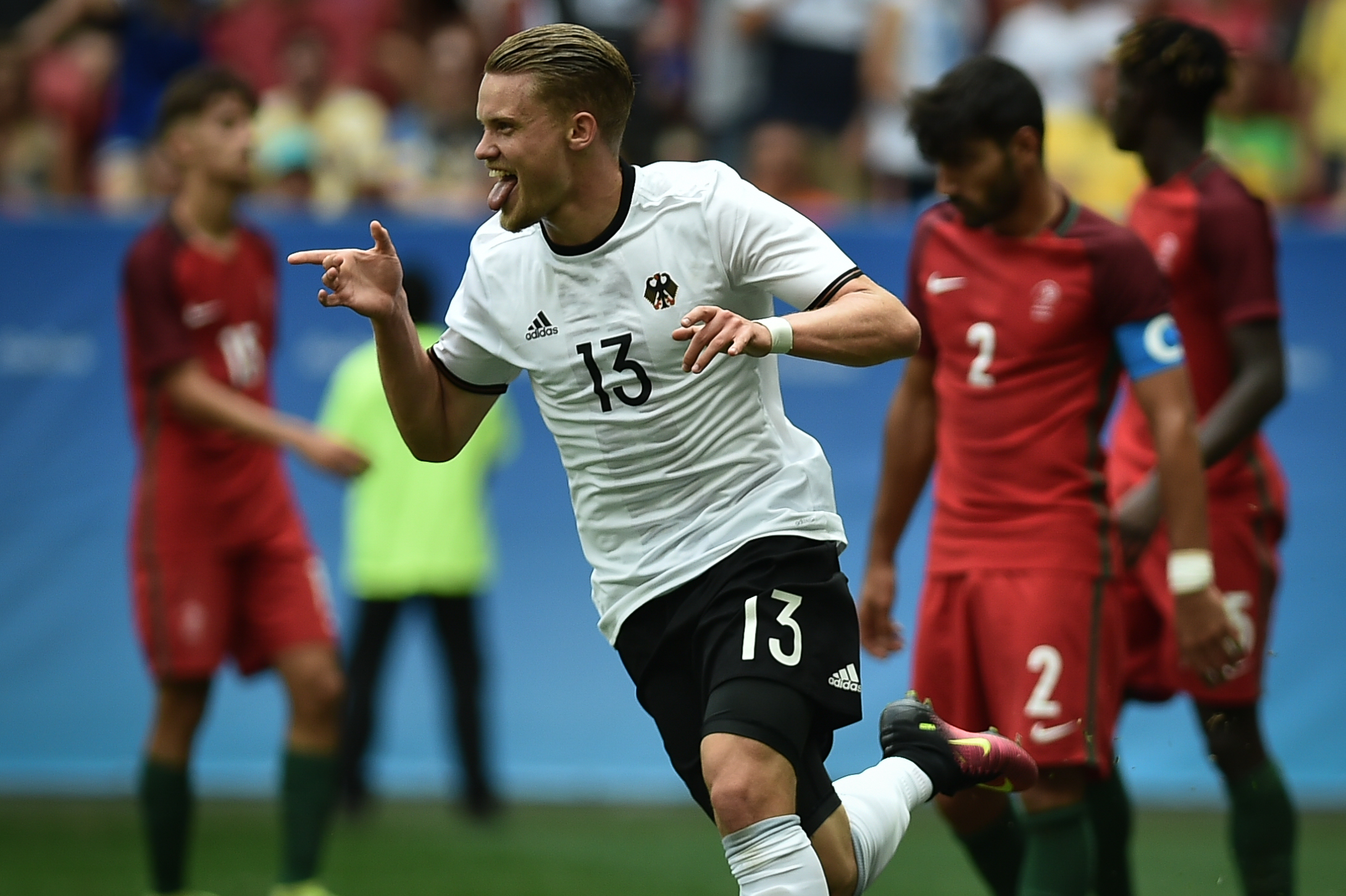
Max with Germany in the 2016 Summer Olympics

Max was part of the squad for the 2016 Summer Olympics, where Germany won the silver medal.

He earned his first call-up for the senior team on 6 November 2020, making his debut on 11 November, in a friendly game against the Czech Republic.

== Personal life ==
He is the son of former German international striker Martin Max.

== Career statistics ==
=== Club ===
Club	Season	League			National cup (Note: Includes DFB-Pokal, KNVB Cup)		Europe		Other		Total	
Club	Season	Division	Apps	Goals	Apps	Goals	Apps	Goals	Apps	Goals	Apps	Goals
Schalke 04	2013–14	Bundesliga	2	0	0	0	0	0	—		2	0
Karlsruher SC	2014–15	2. Bundesliga	22	0	1	0	—		2 (Note: Appearances in Bundesliga relegation play-offs)	0	25	0
Karlsruher SC	2015–16	2. Bundesliga	1	0	0	0	—		—		1	0
Karlsruher SC	Total		23	0	1	0	—		2	0	28	0
FC Augsburg	2015–16	Bundesliga	26	0	1	0	4 (Note: Appearances in UEFA Europa League)	0	—		31	0
FC Augsburg	2016–17	Bundesliga	25	1	1	0	—		—		26	1
FC Augsburg	2017–18	Bundesliga	33	2	1	0	—		—		34	2
FC Augsburg	2018–19	Bundesliga	30	4	4	0	—		—		34	4
FC Augsburg	2019–20	Bundesliga	31	8	0	0	—		—		31	8
FC Augsburg	Total		145	15	7	0	4	0	—		156	15
PSV Eindhoven	2020–21	Eredivisie	31	5	3	1	10	0	—		44	6
PSV Eindhoven	2021–22	Eredivisie	25	1	5	0	17 (Note: Six appearances in UEFA Champions League, five appearances and one goal in UEFA Europa League, six appearances in UEFA Europa Conference League)	1	1 (Note: Appearance in Johan Cruyff Shield)	0	48	2
PSV Eindhoven	2022–23	Eredivisie	14	0	1	0	9 (Note: Four appearances in UEFA Champions League, five appearances in UEFA Europa League)	0	1	0	25	0
PSV Eindhoven	Total		70	6	9	1	36	1	2	0	117	8
Eintracht Frankfurt (loan)	2022–23	Bundesliga	10	0	3	0	2 (Note: Appearances in UEFA Champions League)	0	—		15	0
Eintracht Frankfurt	2023–24	Bundesliga	23	1	2	0	7	0	—		32	1
Eintracht Frankfurt	Total		43	1	5	0	9	0	0	0	57	1
Panathinaikos	2024–25	Super League Greece	7	0	0	0	2 (Note: Appearances in UEFA Conference League)	0	—		9	0
Panathinaikos	2025–26	Super League Greece	0	0	0	0	0	0	—		0	0
Career total			290	22	22	1	51	1	4	0	367	24

=== International ===
Appearances and goals by national team and year
National team	Year	Apps	Goals
Germany
Germany	2020	3	0
Total		3	0

== Honours ==
PSV

- KNVB Cup: 2021–22
- Johan Cruyff Shield: 2021, 2022

Germany

- Summer Olympics Silver medal: 2016

Individual

- Eredivisie Team of the Month: March 2022,
