= Michael Gregoritsch =

Austrian footballer (born 1994)

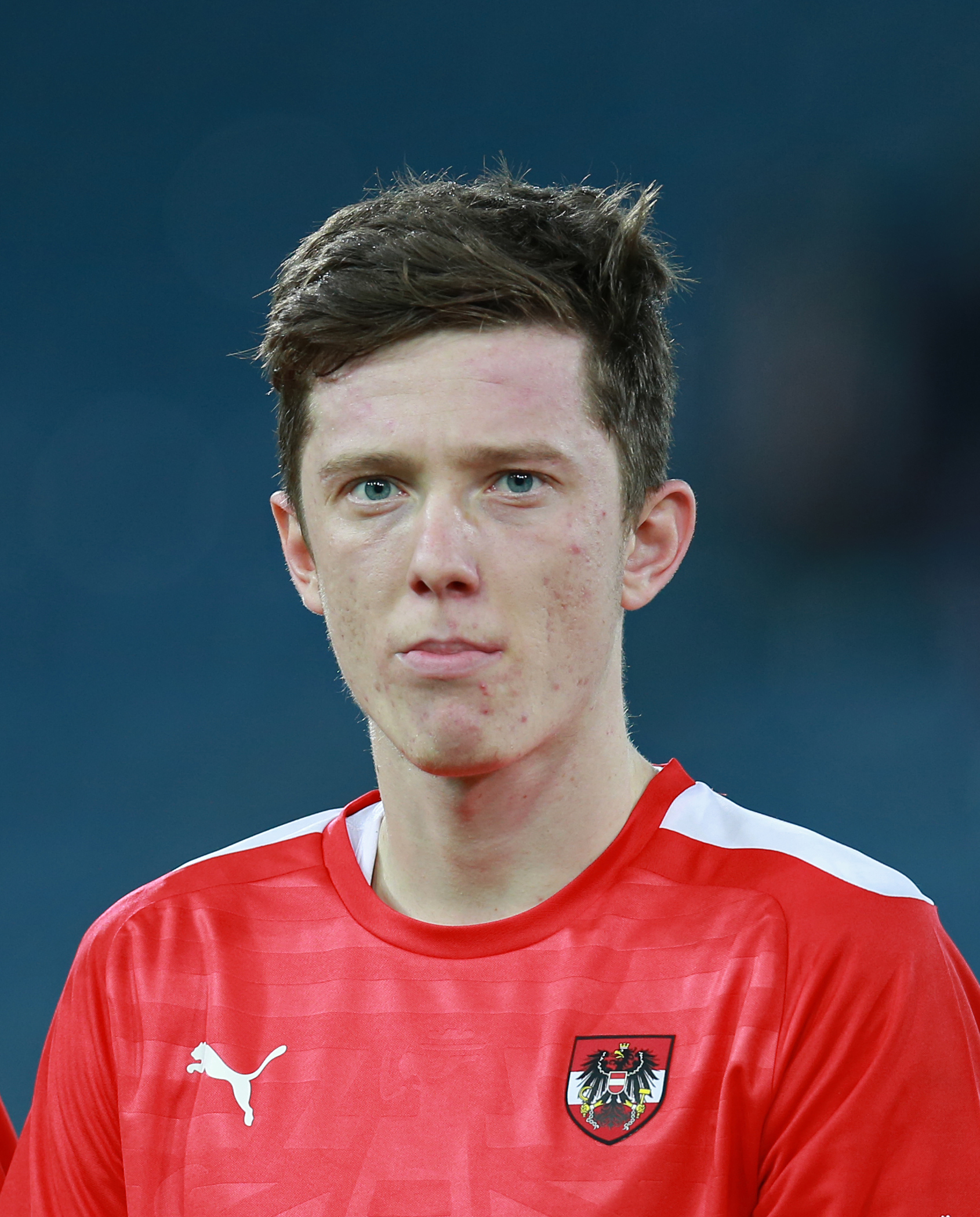
- Gregoritsch with Austria U21 in 2014

Personal information
- Date of birth: 18 April 1994 (age 32)
- Place of birth: Graz, Styria, Austria
- Height: 1.93 m (6 ft 4 in)
- Positions: Winger; striker

Team information
- Current team: FC Augsburg
- Number: 11

Youth career
- 2001–2008: Grazer AK
- 2008–2010: Kapfenberger SV

Senior career*
Years	Team	Apps	(Gls)
2009–2011	Kapfenberger SV II	30	(10)
2010–2011	Kapfenberger SV	28	(10)
2011–2015	TSG Hoffenheim	0	(0)
2011–2012	→ Kapfenberger SV II (loan)	7	(1)
2011–2012	→ Kapfenberger SV (loan)	16	(1)
2012–2013	TSG Hoffenheim II	28	(11)
2013–2014	→ FC St. Pauli II (loan)	5	(2)
2013–2014	→ FC St. Pauli (loan)	15	(1)
2014–2015	→ VfL Bochum (loan)	25	(7)
2015	VfL Bochum	0	(0)
2015–2017	Hamburger SV	55	(10)
2017–2022	FC Augsburg	119	(29)
2019–2020	→ Schalke 04 (loan)	14	(1)
2021	FC Augsburg II	1	(0)
2022–2025	SC Freiburg	82	(19)
2025–2026	Brøndby	11	(2)
2026	→ FC Augsburg (loan)	17	(6)
2026–	FC Augsburg	8	(5)

International career^{‡}
2010	Austria U16	1	(0)
2011	Austria U17	3	(1)
2011–2016	Austria U21	29	(20)
2016–	Austria	83	(25)
- * Club domestic league appearances and goals as of 31 October 2026 ‡ National team caps and goals as of 17 November 2026

Michael Gregoritsch (born 18 April 1994) is an Austrian professional footballer who plays as a forward for Bundesliga club FC Augsburg and the Austria national team.

== Club career ==
=== Early career in Austria ===
In 2008, Gregoritsch began his career at Kapfenberger SV's youth teams and was promoted to the Austrian Bundesliga team in January 2010. He made his debut on 14 April 2010 against Austria Wien and scored his first league goal less than three minutes after coming on as an 82nd-minute substitute. This made him the youngest goalscorer in the history of the Austrian Bundesliga with only 15 years and 361 days. He finished the 2009–10 season with a goal in four appearances. Gregoritsch also made appearances for the reserve team over three seasons.

=== Germany arrival ===
Gregoritsch moved to 1899 Hoffenheim on 28 June 2011 for an undisclosed fee. He signed a four-year contract but was on loan to Kapfenberger SV until June 2012. Gregoritsch only played for the second team of Hoffenheim, where he scored 11 goals in 28 appearances. In 2013, he was on loan to FC St. Pauli, playing for both the first and second teams. Gregoritsch joined VfL Bochum on loan for the 2014–15 season, where he scored seven goals in 27 appearances. He played for Hamburger SV during the 2015–16 and 2016–17 seasons. He scored six goals in 26 appearances during the 2015–16 season and five goals in 32 appearances during the 2016–17 season.

Gregoritsch joined FC Augsburg for the 2017–18 season, scoring three goals in 33 appearances. On 23 December 2019, he joined Schalke 04 on loan until the end of 2019–20 season. On 17 January 2020, Gregoritsch debuted with a goal and an assist in a 2–0 home victory against Borussia Mönchengladbach.

On 8 July 2022, Gregoritsch signed for SC Freiburg ahead of the 2022–23 Bundesliga season.

=== Brøndby ===
On 20 August 2025, Gregoritsch joined Brøndby on a three-year deal. He debuted the following day, coming on for Filip Bundgaard in the 67th minute of a 0–0 draw away to Strasbourg in the UEFA Europa Conference League play-off first leg. Three days later he made his Danish Superliga debut as a starter in a 2–0 defeat away to Sønderjyske. His first Brøndby goal followed in the second leg against Strasbourg on 28 August, making it 3–2 on the night when he converted an indirect free-kick from close range in the 85th minute; Brøndby were eliminated 2–3 on aggregate despite the late rally.

=== Return to FC Augsburg ===
On 7 January 2026, Gregoritsch returned to FC Augsburg on a six-month loan. On 12 June 2026, the transfer was made permanent, Gregoritsch signed a one-season deal with Augsburg with an optional second year.

== International career ==
On 6 September 2016, Gregoritsch debuted for the Austria national team in a 2018 FIFA World Cup qualification against Georgia, coming as a substitute to Marc Janko as Austria won 2–1. On 27 March 2018, he scored his first goal in a 4–0 away win over Luxembourg in a friendly match.

In May 2021, he was named in the Austrian squad for the postponed UEFA Euro 2020. On 13 June 2021, he netted a goal in a 3–1 victory over North Macedonia, helping secure Austria's first-ever European Championship win.

In June 2024, Gregoritsch was called up for the UEFA Euro 2024. On 18 November 2025, he scored the equalizer in a 1–1 home draw against Bosnia and Herzegovina, sealing his nation's place at the top of Group H and securing qualification for the 2026 FIFA World Cup for the first time since 1998.

On 18 May 2026, Gregoritsch was selected in Ralf Rangnick’s 26-man squad for the 2026 FIFA World Cup, marking Austria’s first appearance in the tournament since 1998.

== Personal life ==
As of July 2023, his father, Werner Gregoritsch, is head coach of the Austrian under-21 national team. They are of Slovenian origin.

== Career statistics ==
=== Club ===
As of match played 31 October 2026

Appearances and goals by club, season and competition
Club	Season	League			National cup (Note: Includes Austrian Cup, DFB-Pokal, Danish Cup)		Europe		Total	
Club	Season	Division	Apps	Goals	Apps	Goals	Apps	Goals	Apps	Goals
Kapfenberger SV II	2009–10	Landesliga Steiermark	17	5	—		—		17	5
Kapfenberger SV II	2010–11	Landesliga Steiermark	13	5	—		—		13	5
Kapfenberger SV II (loan)	2011–12	Austrian Regionalliga Central	7	1	—		—		7	1
Kapfenberger SV II (loan)	Total		37	11	—		—		37	11
Kapfenberger SV	2009–10	Austrian Bundesliga	4	1	0	0	—		4	1
Kapfenberger SV	2010–11	Austrian Bundesliga	24	2	5	0	—		29	2
Kapfenberger SV (loan)	2011–12	Austrian Bundesliga	16	1	0	0	—		16	1
Kapfenberger SV (loan)	Total		44	4	5	0	—		49	4
TSG Hoffenheim II	2012–13	Regionalliga Südwest	28	11	—		—		28	11
FC St. Pauli II (loan)	2013–14	Regionalliga Nord	5	1	—		—		5	1
FC St. Pauli (loan)	2013–14	2. Bundesliga	15	1	1	0	—		16	1
VfL Bochum (loan)	2014–15	2. Bundesliga	25	7	2	0	—		27	7
Hamburger SV	2015–16	Bundesliga	25	5	1	1	—		26	6
Hamburger SV	2016–17	Bundesliga	30	5	2	0	—		32	5
Hamburger SV	Total		55	10	3	1	—		58	11
FC Augsburg	2017–18	Bundesliga	32	13	1	0	—		33	13
FC Augsburg	2018–19	Bundesliga	32	6	4	2	—		36	8
FC Augsburg	2019–20	Bundesliga	6	0	1	0	—		7	0
FC Augsburg	2020–21	Bundesliga	24	1	2	0	—		26	1
FC Augsburg	2021–22	Bundesliga	25	9	2	0	—		27	9
FC Augsburg	Total		119	29	10	2	—		129	31
Schalke 04 (loan)	2019–20	Bundesliga	14	1	2	0	—		16	1
FC Augsburg II	2021–22	Regionalliga Bayern	1	0	—		—		1	0
SC Freiburg	2022–23	Bundesliga	30	10	5	2	7 (Note: Appearances in UEFA Europa League)	3	42	15
SC Freiburg	2023–24	Bundesliga	32	7	2	0	8	5	42	12
SC Freiburg	2024–25	Bundesliga	20	2	3	1	—		23	3
SC Freiburg	Total		82	19	10	3	15	8	107	30
Brøndby	2025–26	Danish Superliga	11	2	1	0	2 (Note: Appearances in UEFA Conference League)	1	14	3
FC Augsburg (loan)	2025–26	Bundesliga	17	6	0	0	—		17	6
Augsburg	2026–27	Bundesliga	8	5	2	0	—		10	5
Career total			462	107	36	6	17	9	515	122

=== International ===
As of match played 17 November 2026

Appearances and goals by national team and year
National team	Year	Apps	Goals
Austria	2016	1	0
Austria	2017	4	0
Austria	2018	6	1
Austria	2019	6	1
Austria	2020	6	2
Austria	2021	10	1
Austria	2022	10	2
Austria	2023	8	5
Austria	2024	11	6
Austria	2025	10	5
Austria	2026	11	2
Total		83	25

Scores and results list Austria's goal tally first, score column indicates score after each Gregoritsch goal.

List of international goals scored by Michael Gregoritsch
No.	Date	Venue	Opponent	Score	Result	Competition
1	27 March 2018	Stade Josy Barthel, Luxembourg City, Luxembourg	Luxembourg	3–0	4–0	Friendly
2	6 September 2019	Stadion Wals-Siezenheim, Wals-Siezenheim, Austria	Latvia	6–0	6–0	UEFA Euro 2020 qualifying
3	4 September 2020	Ullevaal Stadion, Oslo, Norway	Norway	1–0	2–1	2020–21 UEFA Nations League B
4	11 October 2020	Windsor Park, Belfast, Northern Ireland	Northern Ireland	1–0	1–0	2020–21 UEFA Nations League B
5	13 June 2021	Arena Națională, Bucharest, Romania	North Macedonia	2–1	3–1	UEFA Euro 2020
6	29 March 2022	Ernst-Happel-Stadion, Vienna, Austria	Scotland	1–2	2–2	Friendly
7	3 June 2022	Gradski Vrt Stadium, Osijek, Croatia	Croatia	2–0	3–0	2022–23 UEFA Nations League A
8	24 March 2023	Raiffeisen Arena, Pasching, Austria	Azerbaijan	2–0	4–1	UEFA Euro 2024 qualifying
9	27 March 2023	Raiffeisen Arena, Pasching, Austria	Estonia	2–1	2–1	UEFA Euro 2024 qualifying
10	17 June 2023	King Baudouin Stadium, Brussels, Belgium	Belgium	1–0	1–1	UEFA Euro 2024 qualifying
11	7 September 2023	Raiffeisen Arena, Linz, Austria	Moldova	1–1	1–1	Friendly
12	12 September 2023	Friends Arena, Stockholm, Sweden	Sweden	1–0	3–1	UEFA Euro 2024 qualifying
13	26 March 2024	Ernst-Happel-Stadion, Vienna, Austria	Turkey	2–1	6–1	Friendly
14	26 March 2024	Ernst-Happel-Stadion, Vienna, Austria	Turkey	3–1	6–1	Friendly
15	26 March 2024	Ernst-Happel-Stadion, Vienna, Austria	Turkey	4–1	6–1	Friendly
16	2 July 2024	Red Bull Arena, Leipzig, Germany	Turkey	1–2	1–2	UEFA Euro 2024
17	13 October 2024	Raiffeisen Arena, Linz, Austria	Norway	5–1	5–1	2024–25 UEFA Nations League B
18	14 November 2024	Pavlodar Central Stadium, Pavlodar, Kazakhstan	Kazakhstan	2–0	2–0	2024–25 UEFA Nations League B
19	20 March 2025	Ernst-Happel-Stadion, Vienna, Austria	Serbia	1–0	1–1	2024–25 UEFA Nations League promotion/relegation play-offs
20	7 June 2025	Ernst-Happel-Stadion, Vienna, Austria	Romania	1–0	2–1	2026 FIFA World Cup qualification
21	10 June 2025	San Marino Stadium, Serravalle, San Marino	San Marino	2–0	4–0	2026 FIFA World Cup qualification
22	9 October 2025	Ernst-Happel-Stadion, Vienna, Austria	San Marino	3–0	10–0	2026 FIFA World Cup qualification
23	18 November 2025	Ernst-Happel-Stadion, Vienna, Austria	Bosnia and Herzegovina	1–1	1–1	2026 FIFA World Cup qualification
24	27 March 2026	Ernst-Happel-Stadion, Vienna, Austria	Ghana	2–0	5–1	Friendly
25	1 October 2026	Aviva Stadium, Dublin, Ireland	Republic of Ireland	2–2	2–2	2026–27 UEFA Nations League B
