= Alfreð Finnbogason =

Icelandic footballer (born 1989)

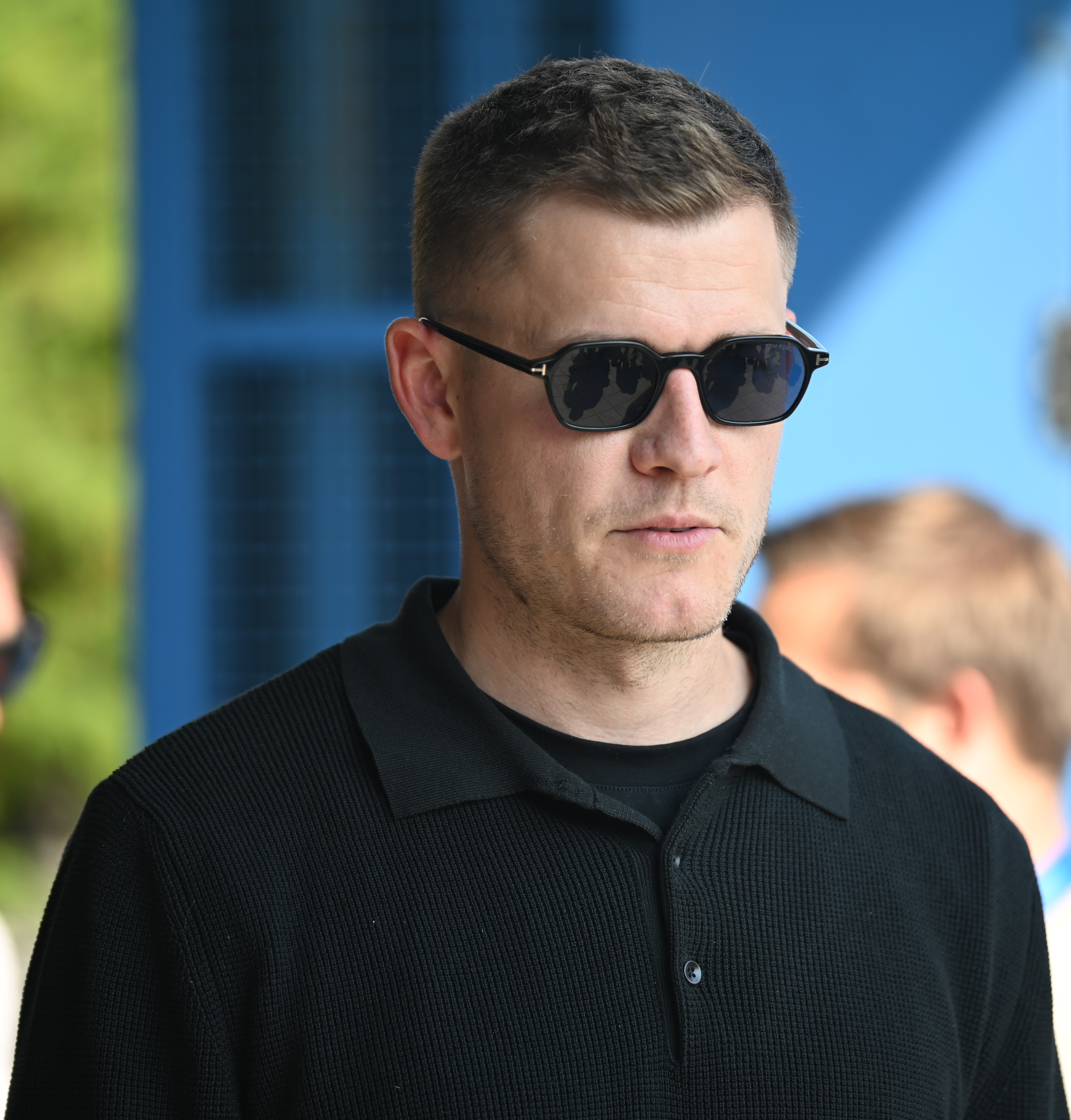
- Finnbogason in 2026

Personal information
- Full name: Alfreð Finnbogason
- Date of birth: 1 February 1989 (age 37)
- Place of birth: Grindavík, Iceland
- Height: 1.85 m (6 ft 1 in)
- Position: Striker

Youth career
- 1995–1999: Grindavík
- 1999–2001: Hutchison Vale
- 2002–2005: Fjölnir
- 2005–2007: Breiðablik
- 2006–2007: → Torres (loan)

Senior career*
Years	Team	Apps	(Gls)
2007–2010	Breiðablik	43	(28)
2007	→ Augnablik (loan)	2	(2)
2011–2012	Lokeren	22	(4)
2012	→ Helsingborg (loan)	17	(12)
2012–2014	Heerenveen	65	(53)
2014–2016	Real Sociedad	23	(2)
2015–2016	→ Olympiacos (loan)	7	(1)
2016	→ FC Augsburg (loan)	14	(7)
2016–2022	FC Augsburg	101	(30)
2022–2023	Lyngby	17	(5)
2023–2024	Eupen	29	(1)
Total		340	(145)

International career
2009–2011	Iceland U21	11	(5)
2010–2023	Iceland	73	(18)
- * Club domestic league appearances and goals

Alfreð Finnbogason (born 1 February 1989) is an Icelandic former professional footballer who played as a striker and who is currently working as the Sports director of Eliteserien club Rosenborg.

With Heerenveen, Alfreð was the Dutch Eredivisie's top scorer in the 2013–14 season with 29 goals, a tally topped only by Luis Suárez, Cristiano Ronaldo and Jonathan Soriano in Europe's top leagues that season.

Alfreð made his debut for the Iceland national team against the Faroe Islands in 2010. He has earned 72 caps to date, scoring 18 goals. He was part of their squad at UEFA Euro 2016 and the 2018 FIFA World Cup, where he became the first Icelander to score a goal in the FIFA World Cup.

== Club career ==
Born in Grindavík, Alfreð played for Ungmennafélag Grindavíkur's youth teams while also spending two years of his childhood in the Scottish capital Edinburgh. Alfreð played for boys' club Hutchison Vale, and became a fan of Hibernian, while his father studied in the city.

=== Breiðablik ===
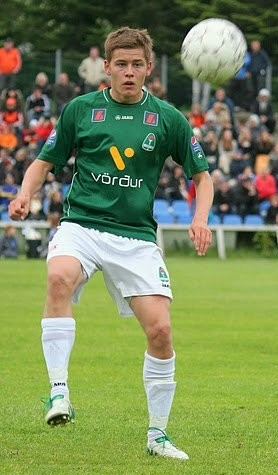
Finnbogason training with Breiðablik

Alfreð joined Breiðablik in 2005, featuring in the club's highly successful youth team alongside future internationals and/or expatriates Gylfi Sigurðsson, Jóhann Berg Guðmundsson, Elfar Freyr Helgason, Guðmundur Kristjánsson, Kristinn Steindórsson and Kristinn Jónsson.

He made his senior debut for Breiðablik in 2008. In the 2009 Úrvalsdeild season, he scored 13 goals in 18 league games for Breiðablik. At the end of the campaign, he was voted Young Player of the Year by his fellow players. Breiðablik also won their first title ever, the Icelandic Cup.

After the 2009 season, he had a trial with Tippeligaen side Viking and English Championship side Blackpool.

In 2010, Alfreð was joint league top goalscorer with 14 goals, and voted player of the year by fellow players as Breiðablik won their first league title and participated for the first time in the UEFA Europa League when they played against Scottish side Motherwell.

=== Lokeren ===
On 3 November 2010, Breiðablik confirmed that an offer for Alfreð from Belgian side Lokeren had been accepted. After completing a medical, Alfreð signed a two-and-a-half-year contract with the club on 20 November 2010.

==== Helsingborgs IF (loan) ====
On 6 March 2012, Alfreð joined Swedish champions Helsingborgs IF on a six-month loan deal, ending on 15 August 2012.

Alfreð scored one goal and made five assists in a 6–1 aggregate win against Polish champions Śląsk Wrocław in the 2012–13 UEFA Champions League Third qualifying round. At the end of the loan period, Alfreð was Helsingborg's top scorer of 2012 with 12 goals in 17 all competitions matches.

=== Heerenveen ===
On 16 August 2012, Alfreð signed a three-year contract with Dutch Eredivisie club Heerenveen. He made a promising start for his new club, scoring two goals in his home debut against top side Ajax in a 2–2 draw and later scoring all four goals away to third division side Kozakken Boys in the KNVB Cup. Alfreð ended the season as the third-highest goalscorer of the Eredivisie, scoring 24 of Heereveen's 50 league goals.

=== Real Sociedad ===
On 2 July 2014, Alfreð signed for Spanish La Liga club Real Sociedad for a €7.5 million transfer fee, rising to €10 million with add-ons. He made his debut for the club later that month, starting in a 2–0 home win against Aberdeen for the season's UEFA Europa League.

==== Olympiacos (loan) ====
Greek champions Olympiacos had previously tried to sign the 26-year-old Icelandic, but failed to reach an agreement with his former club, Heerenveen. Despite the rival interest of PAOK, on 26 July 2015, Olympiacos officially announced that they had signed him on loan from Real Sociedad. He scored his first goal in a friendly game against Beşiktaş on 9 August 2015. Alfreð scored his first competitive and the winning goal for Olympiacos against Arsenal on 29 September 2015, in their Champions League Group F clash, earning Olympiacos their first ever win on English soil, in a 3–2 win at Emirates Stadium.

On 5 December 2015, he scored his first goal with a penalty kick in the Super League in a 4–3 away win against Panthrakikos.

=== FC Augsburg ===
He was loaned to FC Augsburg on 1 February 2016. He made his debut as a substitute against Ingolstadt five days later in a 2–1 defeat. He scored his first goal in his third appearance on 28 February, helping Augsburg to a 2–2 draw with Borussia Mönchengladbach. He would go on to score seven goals in fourteen appearances, and the loan was made permanent on 1 July 2016. On 9 September 2017, he scored a hat-trick in a Bundesliga game against FC Köln, in which Augsburg won by 3–0. On 16 December 2017, he scored another hat-trick in a 3–3 draw against SC Freiburg.

=== Lyngby ===
On 1 September 2022, Finnbogason signed a one-year contract with recently promoted Danish Superliga club Lyngby. He made his debut three days later, coming off the bench in the 64th minute for Tochi Chukwuani in a 2–0 home loss to Randers.

=== Eupen and retirement ===
On 18 August 2023, Alfreð moved to Belgian Pro League club Eupen on a deal until June 2025. He made his debut for the club on 20 August, starting in a 3–1 away victory against Kortrijk. On 17 September, he scored his first goal for the Pandas, a consolation goal in the 80th minute of a 3–1 home loss to Standard Liège. Following Eupen's relegation to the Challenger Pro League, Alfreð reached an agreement with the club to terminate his contract on 5 September 2024. He then announced his retirement from football on 21 November 2024. After retirement he was the technical director for Breiðablik for a year before signing a deal to become the Sports director of Norwegian club Rosenborg in January 2026.

== International career ==
Alfreð earned 11 caps and scored five goals for Iceland at under-21 level. His first goal came on 8 September 2009 in a 2011 UEFA European Under-21 Football Championship Group 5 qualifier 6–2 win against Northern Ireland under-21s at The Showgrounds, Coleraine.

Alfreð won his first cap for the Iceland national team in 2010, coming on as a substitute in a friendly match against the Faroe Islands. Alfreð scored on his full debut for Iceland against Israel in a 3–2 loss at Bloomfield Stadium in Tel Aviv. As of 26 June 2018, Alfreð has 50 caps and 14 goals for the senior team.

He was selected for UEFA Euro 2016.

In May 2018 he was named in Iceland's 23-man squad for the 2018 FIFA World Cup in Russia. In their first match at the tournament, Alfreð scored the equalising goal as Iceland drew 1–1 with Argentina.

In August 2024, Alfreð retired from international football.

== Personal life ==
In 2007, Alfreð spent five months as an exchange student in Sardinia, Italy, playing for Sassari Torres during the stay, where he managed to score in a win against the Italy U-17 national team.

On 19 April 2013, Alfreð set a record for the most goals scored in a season by an Icelandic footballer playing in a top division in any country after he scored his 24th goal of the season, and also his last of the season. The previous record-holder had also played in the Netherlands, Pétur Pétursson, who scored 23 goals in 33 matches for Feyenoord in the 1979–80 Eredivisie.

== Career statistics ==
=== Club ===
Appearances and goals by club, season and competition
Club	Season	League			Cup		League Cup		Continental		Total	
Club	Season	Division	Apps	Goals	Apps	Goals	Apps	Goals	Apps	Goals	Apps	Goals
Augnablik (loan)	2007	3. deild	2	2	—		—		—		2	2
Breiðablik	2008	Úrvalsdeild	4	1	1	0	3	0	—		8	1
Breiðablik	2009	Úrvalsdeild	18	13	4	2	4	0	—		26	15
Breiðablik	2010	Úrvalsdeild	21	14	1	0	6	5	2	0	30	19
Breiðablik	Total		43	28	6	2	13	5	2	0	64	35
Lokeren	2010–11	Belgian Pro League	15	3	—		—		—		15	3
Lokeren	2011–12	Belgian Pro League	7	1	3	2	—		—		10	3
Lokeren	Total		22	4	3	2	0	0	0	0	25	6
Helsingborgs IF	2012	Allsvenskan	17	12	1	0	—		4	1	22	13
Heerenveen	2012–13	Eredivisie	33 (Note: Includes two Europe play-off matches)	24	2	4	—		—		35	28
Heerenveen	2013–14	Eredivisie	32	29	3	2	—		—		35	31
Heerenveen	Total		65	53	5	6	0	0	0	0	70	59
Real Sociedad	2014–15	La Liga	23	2	2	2	—		2	0	27	4
Olympiacos	2015–16	Super League Greece	7	1	3	0	—		3	1	13	2
FC Augsburg (loan)	2015–16	Bundesliga	14	7	0	0	—		—		14	7
FC Augsburg	2016–17	Bundesliga	13	3	1	0	—		—		14	3
FC Augsburg	2017–18	Bundesliga	22	12	1	0	—		—		23	12
FC Augsburg	2018–19	Bundesliga	18	10	2	1	—		—		20	11
FC Augsburg	2019–20	Bundesliga	21	3	0	0	—		—		21	3
FC Augsburg	2020–21	Bundesliga	17	0	1	1	—		—		18	1
FC Augsburg	2021–22	Bundesliga	10	2	2	0	—		—		12	2
FC Augsburg	Total		115	37	7	2	0	0	0	0	122	39
Lyngby	2022–23	Danish Superliga	17	5	0	0	—		—		17	5
Career total			311	143	27	14	13	5	11	2	362	164

=== International ===
Appearances and goals by national team and year
National team	Year	Apps	Goals
Iceland	2010	2	1
Iceland	2011	4	0
Iceland	2012	6	2
Iceland	2013	8	1
Iceland	2014	3	1
Iceland	2015	7	2
Iceland	2016	10	4
Iceland	2017	5	0
Iceland	2018	7	4
Iceland	2019	5	0
Iceland	2020	4	0
Iceland	2021	0	0
Iceland	2022	2	0
Iceland	2023	10	3
Total		73	18

Scores and results list Iceland's goal tally first, score column indicates score after each Alfreð goal.

List of international goals scored by Alfreð Finnbogason
No.	Date	Venue	Cap	Opponent	Score	Result	Competition
1	17 November 2010	Bloomfield Stadium, Tel Aviv, Israel	2	Israel	1–3	2–3	Friendly
2	29 February 2012	Podgorica City Stadium, Podgorica, Montenegro	7	Montenegro	1–1	1–2	Friendly
3	7 September 2012	Laugardalsvöllur, Reykjavík, Iceland	9	Norway	2–0	2–0	2014 FIFA World Cup qualification
4	7 June 2013	Laugardalsvöllur, Reykjavík, Iceland	15	Slovenia	2–1	2–4	2014 FIFA World Cup qualification
5	12 November 2014	King Baudouin Stadium, Brussels, Belgium	23	Belgium	1–1	1–3	Friendly
6	13 November 2015	National Stadium, Warsaw, Poland	29	Poland	2–2	2–4	Friendly
7	17 November 2015	Štadión pod Dubňom, Žilina, Slovakia	30	Slovakia	1–0	1–3	Friendly
8	6 June 2016	Laugardalsvöllur, Reykjavík, Iceland	34	Liechtenstein	3–0	4–0	Friendly
9	5 September 2016	Olimpiyskyi National Sports Complex, Kyiv, Ukraine	38	Ukraine	1–0	1–1	2018 FIFA World Cup qualification
10	6 October 2016	Laugardalsvöllur, Reykjavík, Iceland	39	Finland	2–2	3–2	2018 FIFA World Cup qualification
11	9 October 2016	Laugardalsvöllur, Reykjavík, Iceland	40	Turkey	2–0	2–0	2018 FIFA World Cup qualification
12	2 June 2018	Laugardalsvöllur, Reykjavík, Iceland	46	Norway	1–1	2–3	Friendly
13	7 June 2018	Laugardalsvöllur, Reykjavík, Iceland	47	Ghana	2–0	2–2	Friendly
14	16 June 2018	Otkritie Arena, Moscow, Russia	48	Argentina	1–1	1–1	2018 FIFA World Cup
15	15 October 2018	Laugardalsvöllur, Reykjavík, Iceland	52	Switzerland	1–2	1–2	2018–19 UEFA Nations League A
16	17 June 2023	Laugardalsvöllur, Reykjavík, Iceland	66	Slovakia	1–1	1–2	UEFA Euro 2024 qualifying
17	11 September 2023	Laugardalsvöllur, Reykjavík, Iceland	69	Bosnia and Herzegovina	1–0	1–0	UEFA Euro 2024 qualifying
18	16 October 2023	Laugardalsvöllur, Reykjavík, Iceland	71	Liechtenstein	2–0	4–0	UEFA Euro 2024 qualification

== Honours ==
Breiðablik

- Úrvalsdeild: 2010
- Icelandic Cup: 2009

Olympiacos

- Super League Greece: 2015–16

Individual

- Icelandic Premier League: Player of the Year: 2010
- Icelandic Premier League: Young Player of the Year: 2009
- Icelandic Premier League Silver Boot: 2010
- Icelandic Premier League Bronze Boot: 2009
- Icelandic Premier League Team of the Year: 2009, 2010
- Eredivisie top scorer: 2013–14 (29 goals)
- Danish Superliga Team of the Month: July 2023
