= Fabian Giefer =

German footballer

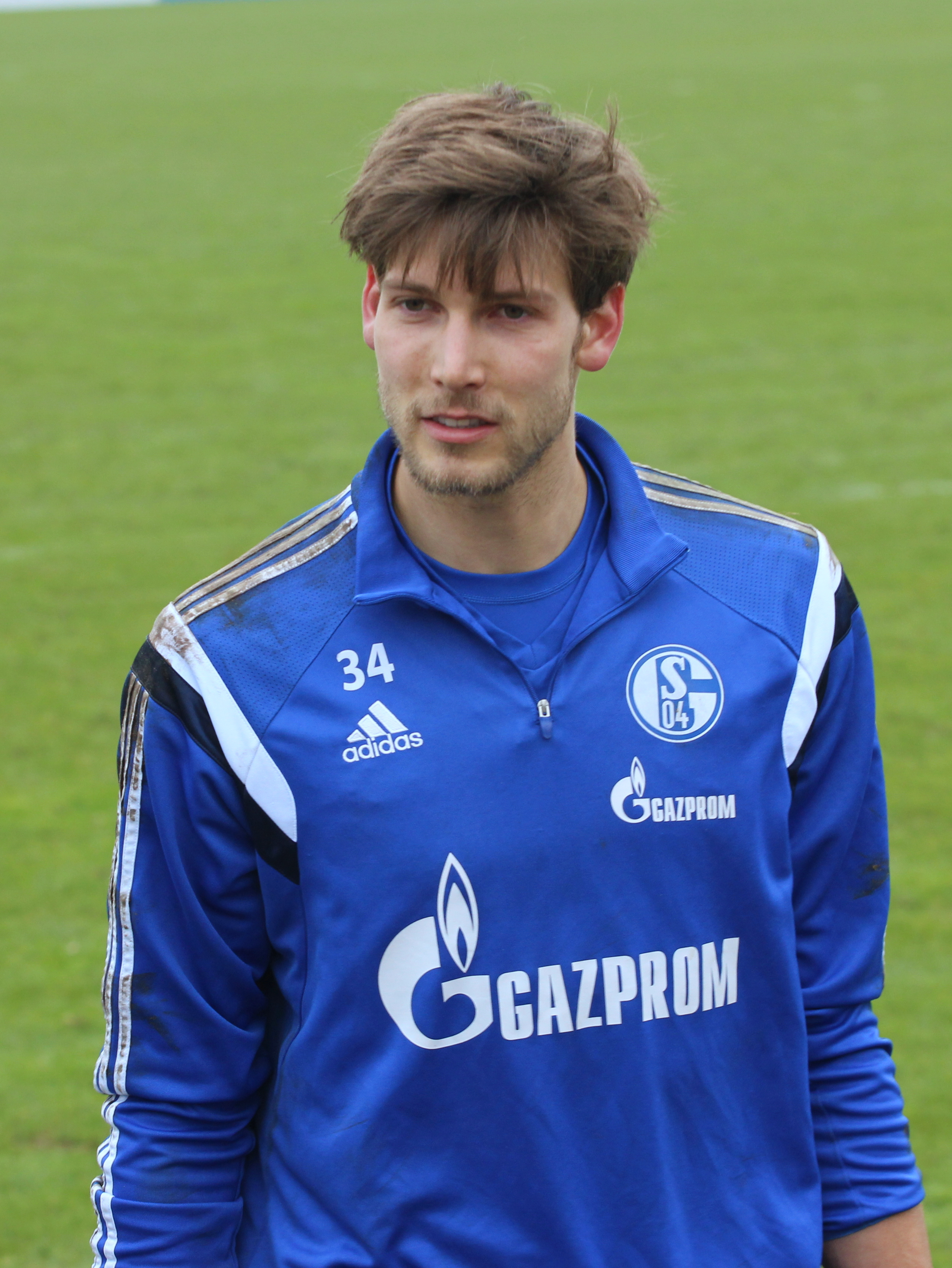
- Giefer with Schalke 04 in 2015

Personal information
- Date of birth: 17 May 1990 (age 36)
- Place of birth: Adenau, West Germany
- Height: 1.96 m (6 ft 5 in)
- Position: Goalkeeper

Youth career
- 1996–1999: 1. FC Oberahr
- 1999–2003: TuRa Lommersdorf
- 2003–2009: Bayer Leverkusen

Senior career*
Years	Team	Apps	(Gls)
2008–2012	Bayer Leverkusen II	44	(0)
2009–2012	Bayer Leverkusen	6	(0)
2012–2014	Fortuna Düsseldorf	64	(0)
2014–2017	Schalke 04	2	(0)
2017	→ Bristol City (loan)	10	(0)
2017–2018	FC Augsburg II	3	(0)
2017–2020	FC Augsburg	4	(0)
2020–2021	Würzburger Kickers	9	(0)
Total		142	(0)

International career
2005–2006	Germany U16	4	(0)
2006–2007	Germany U17	16	(0)
2008	Germany U18	1	(0)
2010	Germany U20	1	(0)
- * Club domestic league appearances and goals as of 3 December 2020

Fabian Giefer (German pronunciation: [ˈɡiːfɐ]; born 17 May 1990) is a German professional footballer who plays as a goalkeeper. Currently a free agent, he last played for Würzburger Kickers.

== Club career ==
=== Bayer Leverkusen ===
Born in Adenau, Rhineland-Palatinate, Giefer began his football career at 1. FC Oberahr as his first youth club. He then move to TuRa Lommersdorf before moving to Bayer Leverkusen, where he started his professional career. He would soon promoted to Bayer Leverkusen II. Griefer played his first Bayer Leverkusen II match in the opening game of the season, in a 2–2 draw against Verl. At Bayer Leverkusen II, Giefer spent the season competing the first choice goalkeeper role with Benedikt Fernandez and Erik Domaschke, which saw him make ten appearances.

Giefer was promoted to the Bayer Leverkusen first team ahead of the 2009–10 season. Having signed his first professional contract with the club he was expected to fight over a first choice goalkeeper role with René Adler. Following Adler's absence, he made his Bundesliga debut on 6 November 2009 against Eintracht Frankfurt, in which he kept a clean sheet in a 4–0 win. While Adler managed to regain his first choice goalkeeper role soon after, he went on to make two appearances for the side in the 2009–10 season against Hannover 96 and Borussia Mönchengladbach.

In the 2010–11 season, Giefer continued to remain a second choice goalkeeper behind Adler. On 1 December 2010, he made his international debut for the UEFA Europa League, substituting Bayer's #1 goalkeeper, René Adler and the team won 1–0 against Norway's Rosenborg. By the end of December, Giefer made two more appearances in all competitions: once came against Atlético Madrid and another in the league against Freiburg. Although he suffered an injury as the season progressed, on 10 April 2011, he made his first appearance of the season, in a 2–1 win over St. Pauli.

In the 2011–12 season, Giefer made his first appearance of the season, but was concussed during the match, which saw Bayer 04 Leverkusen lose 2–0 on 7 August 2011. After the match, Giefer stated that he did not remember anything about the last month. This turned out to be his only appearance, as new arrivals of David Yelldell and Bernd Leno pushed him out of the first team, as well as, his own injury concerns. As a result, Giefer spent most of the season playing for Bayer 04 Leverkusen II side.

=== Fortuna Düsseldorf ===
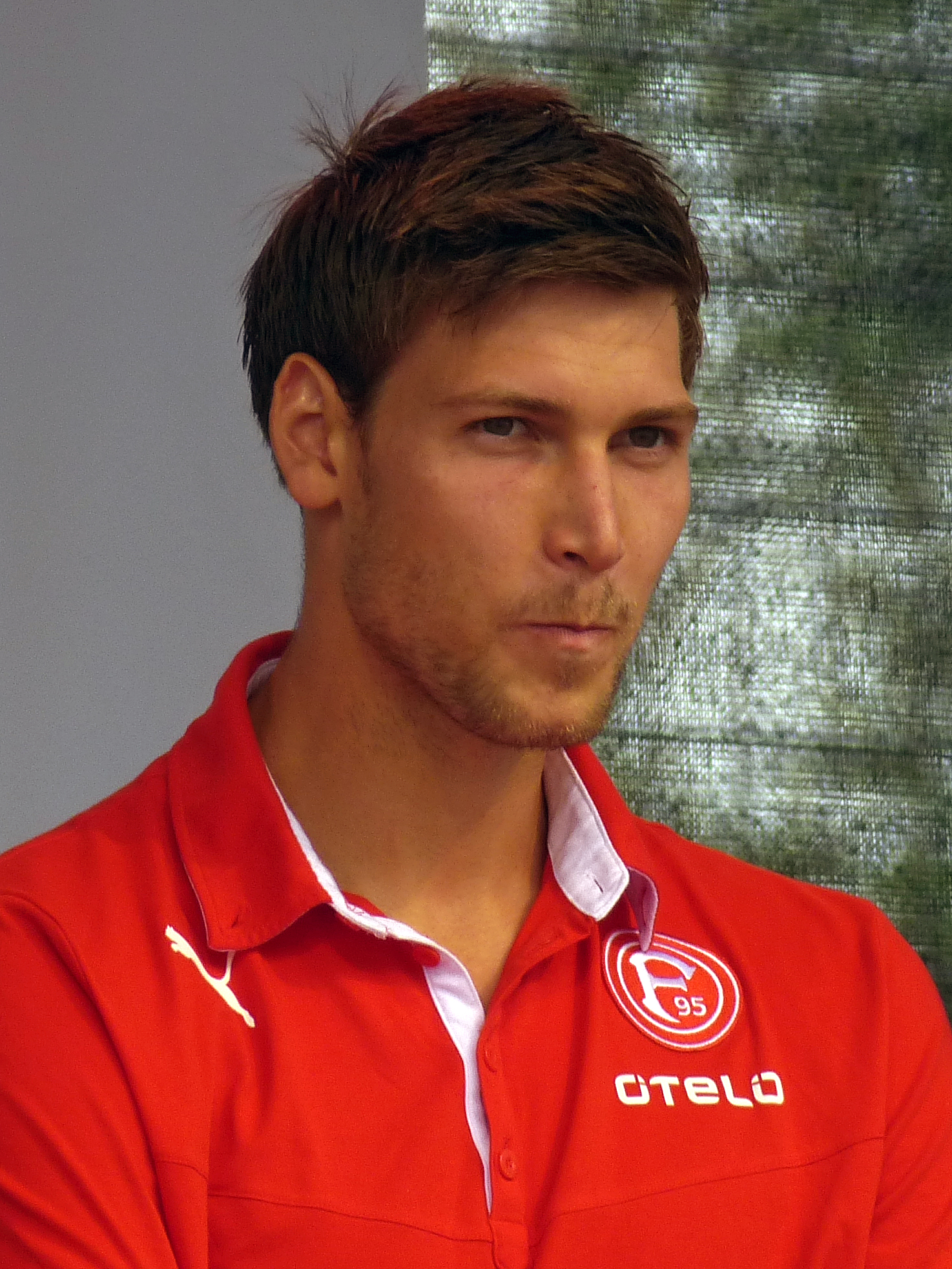
Giefer at Fortuna Düsseldorf in 2013.

On 4 June 2012, it was announced that Giefer would join Fortuna Düsseldorf with a two-year contract until 30 June 2014. He revealed he turned down a move to Bayern Munich because he wanted first team action whereas he would have been a back-up to Bayern's first choice goalkeeper Manuel Neuer had he joined.

Giefer made his competitive debut in the first round of DFB-Pokal, in a 1–0 win over Wacker Burghausen, keeping clean sheet. He did well in the next game against Augsburg in the opening game of the season, where he kept a clean sheet again, in a 2–0 win. Having established himself as first choice goalkeeper, Giefer kept five more clean sheets in the first six league matches until he conceded twice on 28 September 2012, in a 2–2 draw against Schalke 04. Since then, the club's form soon slipped and began a losing streak as the season progressed. In a 3–2 loss against Augsburg on 20 January 2013, Giefer was at fault when he conceded one of the goals and after the match, he said he took a huge responsibility for his mistakes. On 16 February 2013, Giefer made amends when he provided assist for Axel Bellinghausen, in a 1–0 win over Greuther Fürth. Despite playing the whole game in his first season, he was unable to help the club, as they were relegated to the 2. Bundesliga next season.

In the 2013–14 season, Giefer continued to be the club's first choice goalkeeper, where he kept a clean sheet in a 1–0 win over Energie Cottbus in the opening game of the season. He was ever-present goalkeeper at the club until he received a straight red card for conceding a penalty in a 3–0 loss against Erzgebirge Aue on 24 November 2013. After serving a suspension, Giefer returned to the first team on 9 December 2013, where he kept a clean sheet again, in a 1–0 win over Kaiserslautern. He appeared at the substitute bench three times, as the season progressed, Giefer went on to make 31 appearances in all competitions.

=== Schalke 04 ===
It was announced on 6 December 2013 that Giefer would join Schalke 04 next season. In May 2014, the move was confirmed, as he signed a four-year contract and was assigned the squad number 34.

However, at the start of the season, Giefer suffered a setback when he suffered injuries and was sidelined for months. After returning to training, he spent the rest of the year as a substitute behind Ralf Fährmann. He made his Schalke 04 debut on 31 January 2015 when he kept a clean sheet in a 1–0 win over Hannover 96 and made another appearance in the next game on 3 February 2015, in a 1–1 draw against Bayern Munich. he suffered an injury again during the match and was out for the rest of the season.

In the 2015–16 season, Giefer continued to rehabilitate from his injury in the first half of the season. After returning to full training around January, Giefer appeared on the substitute bench between February and March. Giefer suffered another injury that kept him out for the rest of the season. After returning to training, Giefer made a rare appearance for the club in a year, where he played the whole game, in a 2–0 loss against Red Bull Salzburg in the UEFA Europa League match. At the end of the 2016–17 season, Giefer was among players to have their future discussed ahead of the 2017–18 season.

==== Loan to Bristol City ====
On 19 January 2017, Bristol City announced the loan signing of Giefer until the end of the season.

Giefer made his Bristol City debut on 21 January 2017, where he played the whole game, in a 1–0 loss against Nottingham Forest. After making his debut, he was given a handful of first team appearances until he suffered an eye injury, and he subsequently lost his place to reserve goalkeeper, Frank Fielding. He remained on the substitute bench for the rest of the season until he returned to the starting line-up in the last game of the season, in a 1–0 loss against Birmingham City. Following this, Giefer returned to his parent club.

=== FC Augsburg ===
On 8 June 2017, after leaving Schalke 04, Giefer joined FC Augsburg, signing a four-year contract, keeping him until 2021. He played the first game for his new club on 25 August for the reserve team, FC Augsburg II, against Bayern Munich II in the Regionalliga; Augsburg won 5–1. On the first team, Giefer was mainly a backup behind Marwin Hitz as well as Tomáš Koubek, and later even Andreas Luthe, making him fourth on the depth chart. He only appeared in the first-team squad on the last match day in his last season at the club, 2019–20.

=== Würzburger Kickers ===
After making only four competitive appearances in three years, Giefer terminated his contract in Augsburg at the beginning of August 2020 and signed a two-year deal with Würzburger Kickers, who had recently been promoted to the 2. Bundesliga.

== International career ==
After representing the Germany youth team for five years, Giefer was called up by Germany U20 in November 2010. He made his Germany U20 debut, where he played until he was sent-off, in a 2–1 win over Italy U20 on 17 November 2010.

Two years on, Giefer was called up by Germany U21, but withdrew and was replaced by Kevin Trapp.

== Personal life ==
In April 2016, Giefer was fined and had to collect points for dangerous driving. He is married to the German model Annabell Trah.

== Career statistics ==
Appearances and goals by club, season and competition
Club	Season	League			Cup		Continental		Total	
Club	Season	League	Apps	Goals	Apps	Goals	Apps	Goals	Apps	Goals
Bayer Leverkusen II	2007–08	Oberliga Nordrhein	1	0	—		—		1	0
Bayer Leverkusen II	2008–09	Regionalliga West	10	0	—		—		10	0
Bayer Leverkusen II	2009–10	Regionalliga West	13	0	—		—		13	0
Bayer Leverkusen II	2010–11	Regionalliga West	10	0	—		—		10	0
Bayer Leverkusen II	2011–12	Regionalliga West	10	0	—		—		10	0
Bayer Leverkusen II	Total		44	0	—		—		44	0
Bayer Leverkusen	2007–08	Bundesliga	0	0	0	0	0	0	0	0
Bayer Leverkusen	2009–10	Bundesliga	3	0	0	0	—		3	0
Bayer Leverkusen	2010–11	Bundesliga	2	0	0	0	2	0	4	0
Bayer Leverkusen	2011–12	Bundesliga	1	0	0	0	0	0	1	0
Bayer Leverkusen	Total		6	0	0	0	2	0	8	0
Fortuna Düsseldorf	2012–13	Bundesliga	34	0	3	0	—		37	0
Fortuna Düsseldorf	2013–14	2. Bundesliga	30	0	1	0	—		31	0
Fortuna Düsseldorf	Total		64	0	4	0	—		68	0
Schalke 04	2014–15	Bundesliga	2	0	0	0	0	0	2	0
Schalke 04	2015–16	Bundesliga	0	0	0	0	0	0	0	0
Schalke 04	2016–17	Bundesliga	0	0	0	0	1	0	1	0
Schalke 04	Total		2	0	0	0	1	0	3	0
Bristol City	2016–17	Championship	10	0	1	0	0	0	11	0
FC Augsburg II	2017–18	Regionalliga Bayern	3	0	—		—		3	0
FC Augsburg	2018–19	Bundesliga	4	0	0	0	—		4	0
FC Augsburg	2019–20	Bundesliga	0	0	0	0	—		0	0
FC Augsburg	Total		4	0	0	0	—		4	0
Würzburger Kickers	2020–21	2. Bundesliga	9	0	0	0	—		9	0
Career total			142	0	5	0	3	0	150	0
