= Firat Tuncer =

Turkish-German footballer

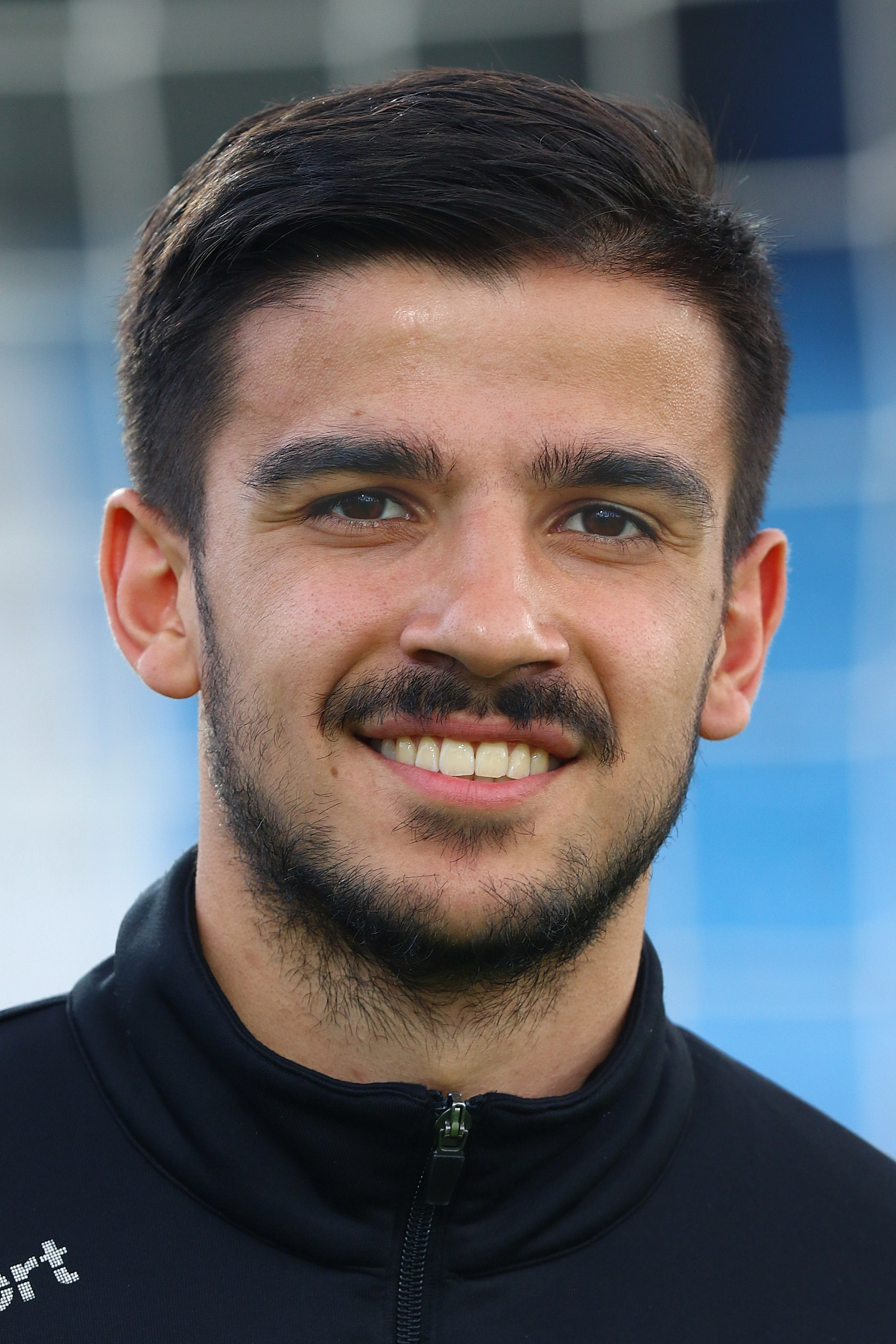
- Tuncer in April 2018

Personal information
- Date of birth: 25 February 1995 (age 31)
- Place of birth: Cologne, Germany
- Height: 1.86 m (6 ft 1 in)
- Position: Centre-back

Team information
- Current team: 1. FC Kaan-Marienborn
- Number: 13

Youth career
- 2006–2014: 1. FC Köln

Senior career*
| Years | Team | Apps | (Gls) |
| 2014–2016 | 1. FC Köln II | 62 | (0) |
| 2017–2019 | Austria Lustenau | 56 | (0) |
| 2019–2020 | Fortuna Köln | 22 | (0) |
| 2020–2022 | ZFC Meuselwitz | 18 | (0) |
| 2022– | 1. FC Kaan-Marienborn | 19 | (0) |

International career
| 2013 | Turkey U18 | 2 | (0) |
- * Club domestic league appearances and goals as of 12 November 2022

Firat Tuncer (born 25 February 1995) is a professional footballer who plays as a centre-back for 1. FC Kaan-Marienborn in the Regionalliga West.

== Club career ==
Tuncer was born in Cologne, and joined local side 1. FC Köln as a youth player. In 2014, he was integrated in to the club's second team, who play in the Regionalliga West. After over 60 appearances, he was released in July 2016. He signed for Austrian side Lustenau in January 2017.

On 12 June 2019, SC Fortuna Köln announced that they had signed Tuncer on a 1-year contract.

== International career ==
Tuncer was called up to the Turkey under-18 side in 2013 to play against Belarus.

== Career statistics ==
=== Club ===
As of 18 July 2018.

| Club | Season | League | | | Cup | | Continental | | Other | | Total | |
| Club | Season | Division | Apps | Goals | Apps | Goals | Apps | Goals | Apps | Goals | Apps | Goals |
|---|---|---|---|---|---|---|---|---|---|---|---|---|
| 1. FC Köln II | 2013–14 | Regionalliga West | 4 | 0 | 0 | 0 | – | | 0 | 0 | 4 | 0 |
| 1. FC Köln II | 2014–15 | Regionalliga West | 28 | 0 | 0 | 0 | – | | 0 | 0 | 28 | 0 |
| 1. FC Köln II | 2015–16 | Regionalliga West | 30 | 0 | 0 | 0 | – | | 0 | 0 | 30 | 0 |
| 1. FC Köln II | Total | | 62 | 0 | 0 | 0 | 0 | 0 | 0 | 0 | 62 | 0 |
| SC Austria Lustenau | 2016–17 | First League | 15 | 0 | 0 | 0 | – | | 0 | 0 | 15 | 0 |
| SC Austria Lustenau | 2017–18 | First League | 14 | 0 | 1 (Note: Appearances in the Austrian Cup) | 0 | – | | 0 | 0 | 15 | 0 |
| SC Austria Lustenau | 2018–19 | Second League | 0 | 0 | 0 | 0 | – | | 0 | 0 | 0 | 0 |
| SC Austria Lustenau | Total | | 29 | 0 | 1 | 0 | 0 | 0 | 0 | 0 | 30 | 0 |
| Career total | | | 90 | 0 | 1 | 0 | 0 | 0 | 0 | 0 | 91 | 0 |
