= Markus Schmidt (referee) =

German football referee (born 1973)

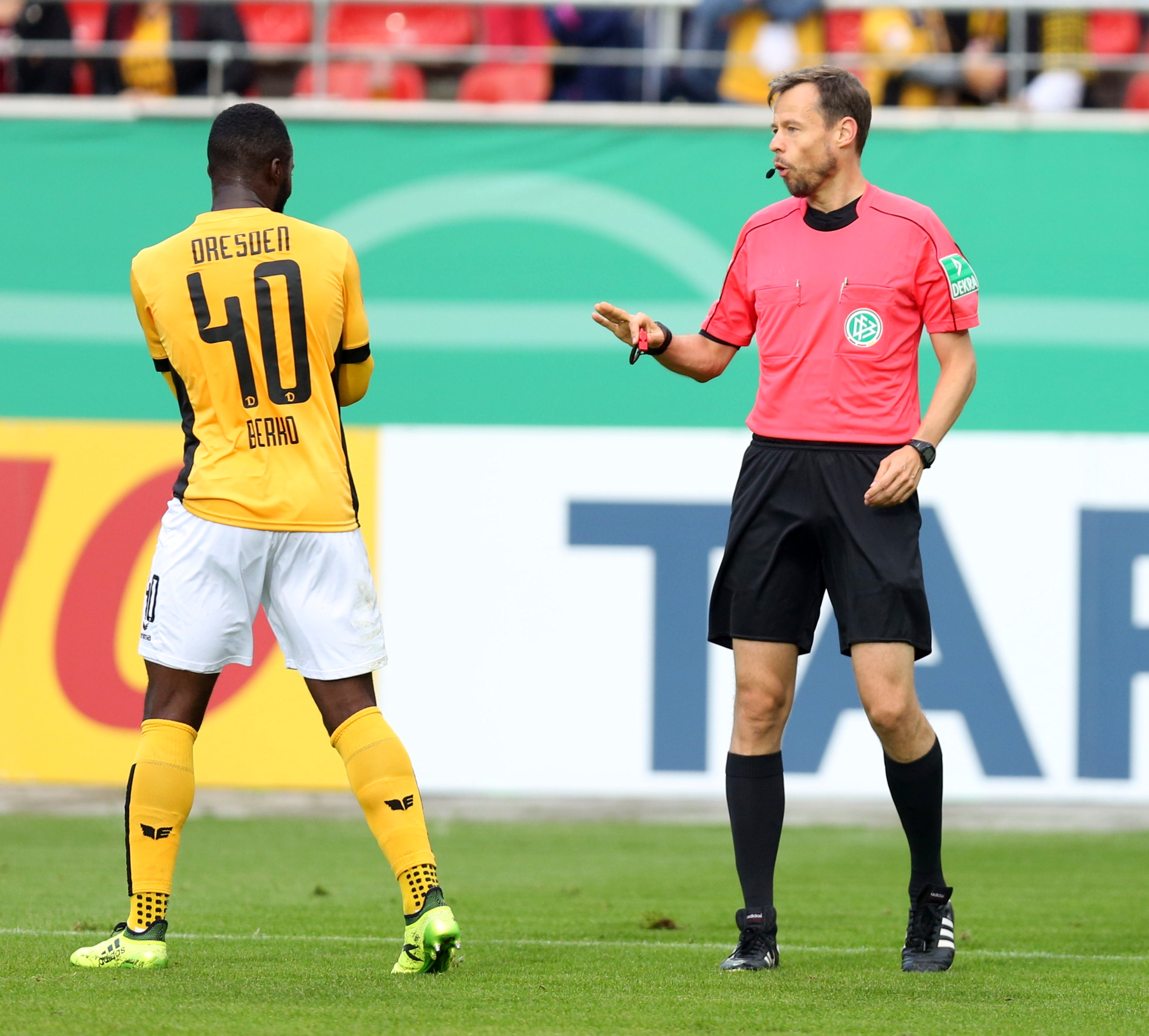
- Schmidt (right) in 2017
- Born: 31 August 1973 (age 53)
- Other occupation: Personnel manager

Domestic
Years	League	Role
1997–	DFB	Referee
1998–2021	2. Bundesliga	Referee
2003–2021	Bundesliga	Referee

Markus Schmidt (born 31 August 1973) is a German football referee who is based in Stuttgart. He referees for SV Sillenbuch of the Württemberg Football Association.

== Refereeing career ==
Schmidt, referee of the club SV Sillenbuch, has been officiating on the DFB level since 1997. In 1998, he was promoted to officiate in the 2. Bundesliga, and in 2003 he rose once again and became a Bundesliga referee. The first Bundesliga match Schmidt officiated was on 16 August 2003 between Hertha BSC and SC Freiburg.

In December 2010, a match officiated by Schmidt on 28 February 2009 between VfL Bochum and Energie Cottbus was suspected of manipulation. This was due to the arrest of an Italian betting fraud, who boasted that he knew the result of the game half an hour before the end of the match, which was won by Bochum with a late penalty.

== Personal life ==
Schmidt lives in Stuttgart, is divorced, and has two children. Up until 2012 he was a consultant for personnel development at the energy company EnBW. Since 2012 he has been the head of personnel at the Stuttgart S-Bahn.
