= Caiuby =

Brazilian footballer (born 1988)

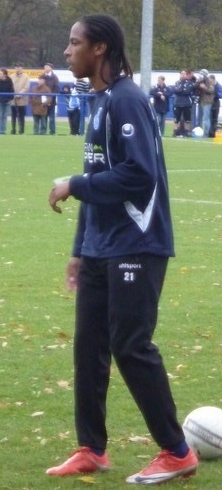
- Caiuby at practice with MSV Duisburg in 2009

Personal information
- Full name: Caiuby Francisco da Silva
- Date of birth: 14 July 1988 (age 38)
- Place of birth: São Paulo, Brazil
- Height: 1.84 m (6 ft 0 in)
- Position: Forward

Team information
- Current team: Grêmio Prudente

Senior career*
Years	Team	Apps	(Gls)
2005–2006	Ferroviária	10	(1)
2007	São Paulo	0	(0)
2007–2008	Corinthians	0	(0)
2008	Guaratinguetá	0	(0)
2008	→ São Caetano (loan)	11	(6)
2008–2012	VfL Wolfsburg	9	(1)
2009–2010	→ MSV Duisburg (loan)	30	(5)
2011–2012	→ FC Ingolstadt (loan)	41	(6)
2012–2014	FC Ingolstadt	63	(15)
2014–2019	FC Augsburg	100	(11)
2019	→ Grasshopper (loan)	9	(0)
2021	FC Ingolstadt	19	(1)
2022	Kavala	18	(5)
2022–2023	Türkgücü München	0	(0)
2024	Patrocinense	8	(1)
2024–2025	Aymorés		
2025	EC São Bernardo		
2025–2026	São Caetano		
2026–	Grêmio Prudente		
- * Club domestic league appearances and goals as of 14 November 2026

Caiuby Francisco da Silva (born 14 July 1988), commonly known as Caiuby, is a Brazilian professional footballer who plays as a forward for Grêmio Prudente.

== Career ==
Caiuby was born in São Paulo. His former clubs include São Paulo FC, Corinthians and AD São Caetano.

On 29 August 2008, he joined VfL Wolfsburg from Brazilian club Guaratinguetá, signing a contract until 2013. On 20 July 2009, the 2. Bundesliga club MSV Duisburg signed the 21-year-old striker on loan from VfL Wolfsburg for one year. He played his first game in a friendly match against Club Brugge. After his loan ended, he returned to VfL Wolfsburg, but failed to establish himself. In January 2011, he was loaned out again, this time to FC Ingolstadt 04.

In February 2019, he joined Grasshopper Club Zürich on loan from FC Augsburg until the end of the season.

He returned to FC Ingolstadt 04 in January 2021. He left the club in June 2021.

During the 2022 winter transfer window, Caiuby joined Kavala, a Greek club who participates at the second tier of Greek Football, Super League Greece 2.

Caiuby returned to Germany on 19 August 2022, signing with recently relegated Regionalliga Bayern club Türkgücü München.

== Honours ==
VfL Wolfsburg

- Bundesliga: 2008–09
