= Sören Storks =

German football referee (born 1988)

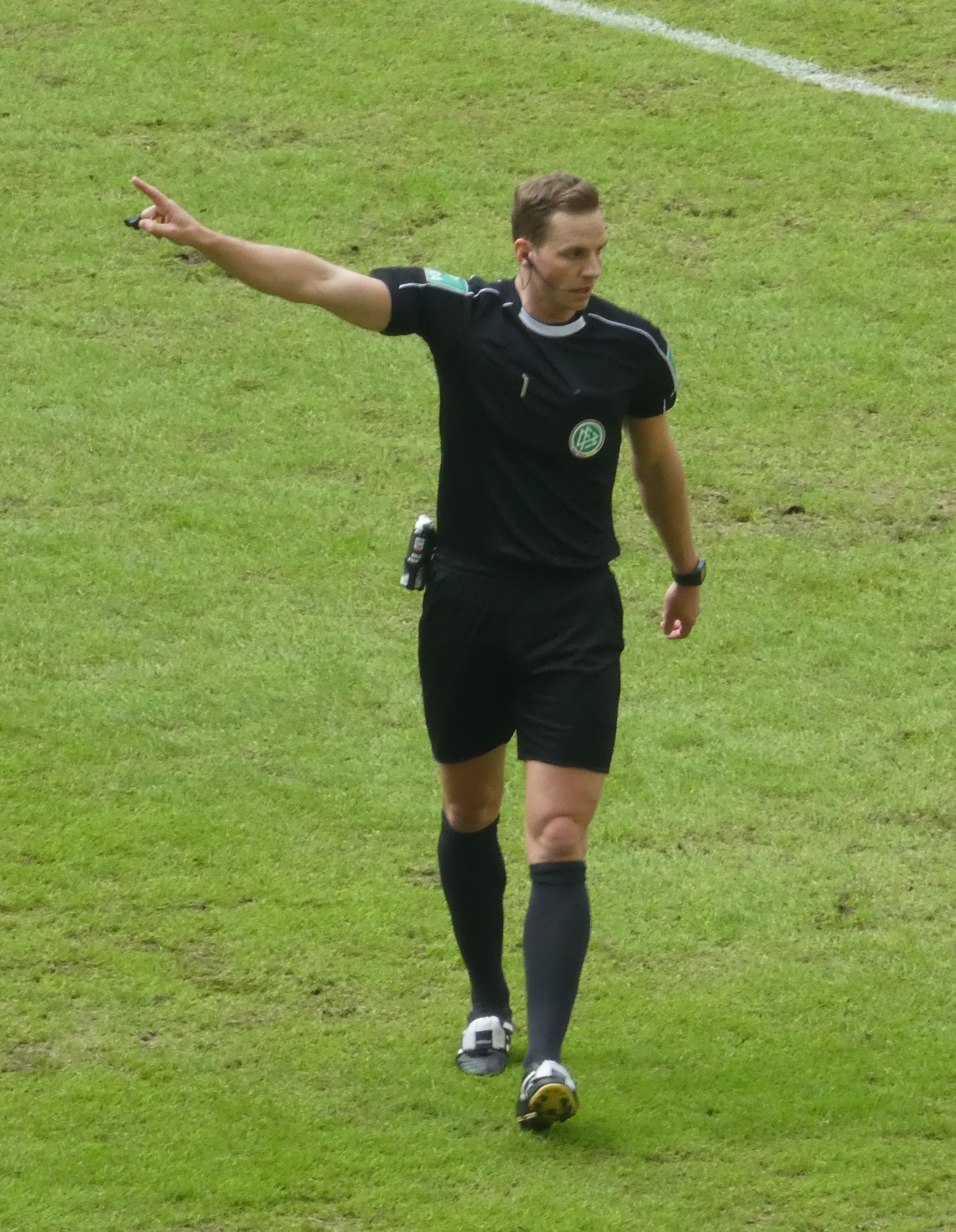
- Storks in 2018
- Born: 9 November 1988 (age 37)
- Other occupation: Carpenter

Domestic
Years	League	Role
2013–	DFB	Referee
2015–	2. Bundesliga	Referee
2017–	Bundesliga	Referee

Sören Storks (born 9 November 1988) is a German football referee who is based in Velen. He referees for VfL Ramsdorf of the Westphalian Football and Athletics Association.

== Refereeing career ==
Storks, referee of the club VfL Ramsdorf, has officiated on the DFB level since 2013. He began officiating in the 3. Liga for the 2012–13 season, refereeing his first match between Rot-Weiß Erfurt and VfB Stuttgart II on 7 August 2012. After three years, Jablonski was nominated as referee for the 2015–16 season of the 2. Bundesliga, refereeing his first match between FSV Frankfurt and FC St. Pauli on 30 August 2015. In 2017, Storks was one of four referees promoted to officiate in the Bundesliga for the 2017–18 season.

== Personal life ==
Storks lives in Velen, where he works as a carpenter.
