= 2013–14 Bayer 04 Leverkusen season =

Bayer Leverkusen
2013–14 season
- Sporting Director: Rudi Völler
- Manager: Sami Hyypiä (until 5 April 2014); Sascha Lewandowski (from 5 April 2014)
- Stadium: BayArena
- Bundesliga: 4th
- DFB-Pokal: Quarter-finals
- UEFA Champions League: Round of 16
- Top goalscorer: League: Stefan Kießling (15); All: Stefan Kießling (19)
Home colours	Away colours	Third colours

The 2013–14 Bayer 04 Leverkusen season was the 110th season in the club's football history.

== Background ==
=== Background information ===
In the 2012–13 season, Bayer Leverkusen finished in third place in the Bundesliga. As the third place team, they qualified for the group stage of Champions League. During the off-season Kostas Stafylidis, Robbie Kruse, Andrés Palop, Son Heung-min and Emre Can were signed. Daniel Schwaab, Hajime Hosogai, Michael Rensing, Dani Carvajal, André Schürrle, and Michal Kadlec were sold. Junior Fernándes was loaned out to Dinamo Zagreb. Nicolai Jørgensen made his loan move permanent and Manuel Friedrich was released. Sami Hyypiä became the sole head coach after Sascha Lewandowski left his position as co–head coach. Lewandowski remained with the club in the youth set-up. Bayer Leverkusen announced a three–year partnership agreement with the tourism agency with Austrian state of Salzburg. The agreement includes an annual summer training camp in Kaprun, at least one friendly against an "attractive opponent" during the training camp, vents in and around Leverkusen, public relations and promotional activities at the club and in North Rhine Westphalia, targeted hospitality measures at the stadium, International press conferences at the training camps, advertising at the BayArena perimeter advertising at Bayer Leverkusen home games, online presence on all relevant channels at Bayer Leverkusen, Salzburg articles in all Bayer 04 Leverkusen print media. Bayer Leverkusen started pre–season training on 24 June with eight players. Reserve and youth teams players came to training to improve the number situation for training. Bayer Leverkusen announced on 12 December that they signed Julian Brandt for the winter transfer period. The following day, Bayer Leverkusen announced that they brought in Ryu Seung-Woo on loan for a year with the option to purchase. Players reported back on 4 January and traveled to Lagos, Portugal for mid–season training camp and had their first training session on 5 January. Bayer Leverkusen are interested in Kevin De Bruyne and met with him and his representative on 16 December. But De Bruyne ended up signing with VfL Wolfsburg.

=== Transfers ===
==== In ====
Pos.	Name	Age	Moving from	Type	Transfer Window	Contract ends	Transfer fee	Ref.
DF	Kostas Stafylidis	19	PAOK	Transfer	Summer	2018	€1.5 Million	
FW	Robbie Kruse	24	Fortuna Düsseldorf	Transfer	Summer	2016	€1.5 Million	
GK	Andrés Palop	39	Sevilla	End of contract	Summer	2014	Free	
FW	Son Heung-min	20	Hamburger SV	Transfer	Summer	2018	Undisclosed	
MF	Emre Can	19	Bayern Munich	Transfer	Summer	2017	Undisclosed	
FW	Julian Brandt	17	VfL Wolfsburg	Transfer	Winter	2019	Undisclosed	
FW	Ryu Seung-Woo	20	Jeju United	Loan	Winter	—	Undisclosed	

==== Out ====
Pos.	Name	Age	Moving to	Type	Transfer Window	Transfer fee	Ref.
DF	Daniel Schwaab	24	VfB Stuttgart	Transfer	Summer	Free	
MF	Hajime Hosogai	27	Hertha BSC	Transfer	Summer	Undisclosed	
DF	Dani Carvajal	21	Real Madrid	Transfer	Summer	€6.5 Million	
GK	Michael Rensing	29	Fortuna Düsseldorf	End of contract	Summer	Free	
FW	Junior Fernándes	24	Dinamo Zagreb	Loan	Summer	Undisclosed	
MF	Nicolai Jørgensen	22	F.C. Copenhagen	Transfer	Summer	Undisclosed	
DF	Manuel Friedrich	33	Borussia Dortmund	Released	Summer	Free	
FW	André Schürrle	22	Chelsea	Transfer	Summer	€23 Million	
DF	Michal Kadlec	28	Fenerbahçe	Transfer	Summer	Undisclosed	

== Bundesliga ==
Bayer Leverkusen started their Bundesliga campaign against SC Freiburg on 10 August. Bayer Leverkusen 3–1. Stefan Kießling, Son Heung-min, and Sidney Sam scored for Bayer Leverkusen. Mike Hanke scored for Freiburg. Bayer Leverkusen finished the matchday tied for third place in the table with Bayern Munich. Bayer Leverkusen went on to face VfB Stuttgart on matchday two on 17 August. Bayer Leverkusen won 1–0 with an own goal from Daniel Schwaab. Bayer Leverkusen were tied with Bayern Munich for second place in the table. Then Bayer Leverkusen faced Borussia Mönchengladbach on matchday three on 24 August. Bayer Leverkusen won 4–2. Bayer Leverkusen's goalscorers were Kießling, Sidney Sam (2 goals), and Gonzalo Castro. Martin Stranzl and Juan Arango scored for Borussia Mönchengladbach. Bayer Leverkusen finished the matchday 3 in second place. Bayer Leverkusen finished August with matchday four against Schalke 04 on 31 August. Schalke 04 won 2–0 with goals from Marco Höger and Jefferson Farfán. Bayer Leverkusen finished August tied for third place with Hannover 96. Bayer Leverkusen started September with matchday five against VfL Wolfsburg on 14 September. Bayer Leverkusen won 3–1. Sidney Sam and Kießling (2 goals) scored for Bayer Leverkusen and Ivica Olić scored for Wolfsburg. Bayer Leverkusen remained in third place. Bayer Leverkusen Mainz 05 on matchday six on 21 September. Bayer Leverkusen won 4–1. Bayer Leverkusen's goalscorers were Robbie Kruse (2 goals), Lars Bender, and Kießling. Yunus Mallı scored for Mainz. Bayer Leverkusen remained in third place in the Bundesliga table. Bayer Leverkusen faced Hannover 96 on matchday seven on 28 September. Bayer Leverkusen won 2–0 with goals from Simon Rolfes and Sidney Sam. Bayer Leverkusen finished the matchday in fifth place. Bayern Munich on matchday eight on 5 October. The match ended in a 1–1 draw. Sidney Sam scored for Bayer Leverkusen and Toni Kroos scored for Bayern Munich. Bayer Leverkusen finished the matchday in third place. Bayer Leverkusen then faced 1899 Hoffenheim on matchday nine on 18 October. Bayer Leverkusen won 2–1. Sidney Sam and Kießling scored for Bayer Leverkusen. Kießling's goal went through the side netting on the left side. kicker magazine called the goal "Phantomtor". Stefan Kießling later apologized for the goal and understood why it was an illegitimate goal. Sven Schipplock scored for 1899 Hoffenheim. Bayer Leverkusen finished the matchday in third place. On 28 October, the German Football Association decided not to replay the match against 1899 Hoffenheim. Hoffenheim decided not to appeal the decision. Bayer Leverkusen finished October against FC Augsburg on matchday 10 on 26 October. Bayer Leverkusen won 2–1. Simon Rolfes and Emre Can scored for Bayer Leverkusen. André Hahn scored for Augsburg. Bayer Leverkusen finished October in third place. Bayer Leverkusen started November with matchday 11 of the Bundesliga against Eintracht Braunschweig on 2 November. Eintracht Braunschweig won 1–0 with a goal from Dominick Kumbela. Bayer Leverkusen finished the matchday in third place. Bayer Leverkusen were against Hamburger SV on matchday 12 on 9 November. Bayer Leverkusen won 5–3. Son (3 goals), Kießling and Gonzalo Castro scored for Bayer Leverkusen. Maximilian Beister (2 goals) and Pierre-Michel Lasogga scored for Hamburg. Bayer Leverkusen finished the matchday in third place. Bayer Leverkusen's next opponents were Hertha BSC on matchday 13 on 23 November. Bayer Leverkusen won 1–0 with a goal from Kießling. Bayer Leverkusen finished the matchday in third place. Bayer Leverkusen finished November with matchday 14 against 1. FC Nürnberg on 30 November. Bayer Leverkusen won 3–0 with goals from Son and Kießling. Bayer Leverkusen finished November in third place. Bayer Leverkusen started December against Borussia Dortmund on matchday 15 on 7 December. Bayer Leverkusen won 1–0 with a goal from Son. Bayer Leverkusen moved up to second place in the table. Bayer Leverkusen faced Eintracht Frankfurt on matchday 16 on 15 December. Eintracht Frankfurt won 1–0 with a goal from Marco Russ. Bayer Leverkusen finished the matchday in second place. Bayer Leverkusen finished December against Werder Bremen on matchday 17 on 21 December. Werder Bremen won 1–0 with a goal from Santiago García. Bayer Leverkusen finished December in second place.

=== League table ===
Pos	Team	Pld	W	D	L	GF	GA	GD	Pts	Qualification or relegation
2	Borussia Dortmund	34	22	5	7	80	38	+42	71	Qualification for the Champions League group stage
3	Schalke 04	34	19	7	8	63	43	+20	64	Qualification for the Champions League group stage
4	Bayer Leverkusen	34	19	4	11	60	41	+19	61	Qualification for the Champions League play-off round
5	VfL Wolfsburg	34	18	6	10	63	50	+13	60	Qualification for the Europa League group stage (Note: The 2013–14 DFB-Pokal finalists (Borussia Dortmund and Bayern Munich) qualified for the UEFA Champions League, thus the three Europa League places were distributed through league positions.)
6	Borussia Mönchengladbach	34	16	7	11	59	43	+16	55	Qualification for the Europa League play-off round

Source: DFB
Rules for classification: 1) points; 2) goal difference; 3) number of goals scored.

=== Match results ===
Bundesliga match details
Match	Date	Time	Opponent	Venue	Result F–A	Scorers	Attendance	League position	Ref.
1	10 August 2013	15:30	SC Freiburg	H	3–1	Kießling 22', Son 47', Sam 53'	27,136	3rd	
2	17 August 2013	14:30	VfB Stuttgart	A	1–0	Schwaab 42' (o.g.)	40,800	2nd	
3	24 August 2013	14:30	Borussia Mönchengladbach	H	4–2	Kießling 23' (pen.), Sam 28', 60', Castro 72'	29,243	3rd	
4	31 August 2013	17:30	Schalke 04	A	0–2		61,973	3rd	
5	14 September 2013	15:30	VfL Wolfsburg	H	3–1	Sam 24', Kießling 65', 90+2'	27,149	3rd	
6	21 September 2013	15:30	Mainz 05	A	4–1	Kruse 19', 45+1', L. Bender 38', Kießling 59'	30,000	3rd	
7	28 September 2013	15:30	Hannover 96	H	2–0	Rolfes 23', Sam 37'	25,198	3rd	
8	5 October 2013	18:30	Bayern Munich	H	1–1	Sam 31'	30,210	3rd	
9	18 October 2013	20:30	1899 Hoffenheim	A	2–1	Sam 26', Kießling 70'	25,213	3rd	
10	26 October 2013	15:30	FC Augsburg	H	2–1	Rolfes 34', Can 83'	27,811	3rd	
11	2 November 2013	15:30	Eintracht Braunschweig	A	0–1		22,720	3rd	
12	9 November 2013	15:30	Hamburger SV	H	5–3	Son 9', 16', 55', Kießling 72', Castro 89'	30,077	3rd	
13	23 November 2013	15:30	Hertha BSC	A	1–0	Kießling 29'	47,419	2nd	
14	30 November 2013	15:30	1. FC Nürnberg	H	3–0	Son 36', 76', Kießling 47'	27,395	2nd	
15	7 December 2013	18:30	Borussia Dortmund	A	1–0	Son 18'	80,645	2nd	
16	15 December 2013	22:00	Eintracht Frankfurt	H	0–1		26,242	2nd	
17	21 December 2013	15:30	Werder Bremen	A	0–1		39,145	2nd	
18	25 January 2014	15:30	SC Freiburg	A	2–3	Bender 4', Rolfes 35'	22,100	2nd	
19	1 February 2014	15:30	VfB Stuttgart	H	2–1	Kießling 26', 84'	28,714	2nd	
20	7 February 2014	20:30	Borussia Mönchengladbach	A	1–0	Son 62'	53,379	2nd	
21	15 February 2014	18:30	Schalke 04	H	1–2	Santana 66' (o.g.)	30,210	2nd	
22	22 February 2014	15:30	VfL Wolfsburg	A	1–3	Sam 45'	27,721	2nd	
23	1 March 2014	15:30	Mainz 05	H	0–1		25,503	3rd	
24	8 March 2014	15:30	Hannover 96	A	1–1	Castro 28'	46,600	3rd	
25	15 March 2014	18:30	Bayern Munich	A	1–2	Kießling 90+1'	71,000	4th	
26	23 March 2014	17:30	1899 Hoffenheim	H	2–3	Kießling 39', Rolfes 54'	28,794	4th	
27	26 March 2014	20:00	FC Augsburg	A	3–1	Kießling 11', Can 80', Son 83'	27,114	4th	
28	29 March 2014	15:30	Eintracht Braunschweig	H	1–1	Kießling 53' (pen.)	30,210	4th	
29	4 April 2014	20:30	Hamburger SV	A	1–2	Brandt 58'	49,575	5th	
30	13 April 2014	15:30	Hertha BSC	H	2–1	Kießling 1', Brandt 24'	29,377	4th	
31	20 April 2014	15:30	1. FC Nürnberg	A	4–1	Spahić 16', 80', Boenisch 48', Hilbert 87'	40,514	4th	
32	26 April 2014	18:30	Borussia Dortmund	H	2–2	Bender 7', Castro 35'	30,210	4th	
33	3 May 2014	15:30	Eintracht Frankfurt	A	2–0	Castro 27', Can 36'	51,000	4th	
34	10 May 2014	15:30	Werder Bremen	H	2–1	Toprak 34', Son 53'	30,210	4th	

== DFB–Pokal ==
The first round of the DFB-Pokal on 15 June. Bayer Leverkusen was drawn against Lippstadt 08. The match took place on 3 August. Bayer Leverkusen won 6–1. Lars Bender, Sidney Sam, Stefan Kießling (2 goals), and Son Heung-min (2 goals) scored for Bayer Leverkusen. Benjamin Kolodzig scored for Lippstadt 08. On 10 August, Bayer Leverkusen was drawn against Arminia Bielefeld for the second round. The match took place on 24 September. Bayer Leverkusen won 2–0 with goals from Son and Sam. On 29 September, Bayer Leverkusen were drawn against SC Freiburg in the draw for the round of 16. The match took place on 4 December. Bayer Leverkusen won 2–1. Robbie Kruse and Emre Can scored for Bayer Leverkusen and Matthias Ginter scored for Freiburg. The draw for the Quarter–finals happened on 8 December. The result was that Bayer Leverkusen would face 1. FC Kaiserslautern. The match was played on 12 February. Kaiserslautern won 1–0 with an extra time goal from Srđan Lakić. Andrés Guardado made his first appearance for Bayer Leverkusen in the match.

=== DFB-Pokal results ===
Win Draw Loss Postponed

DFB-Pokal match details
Round	Date	Time	Opponent	Venue	Result F–A	Scorers	Attendance	Ref.
R1	3 August 2013	15:30	A	Lippstadt 08	6–1	3,500	Bender 5', Sam 24', 81', Kießling 41', 86', Son 63'	
R2	24 September 2013	20:30	A	Arminia Bielefeld	2–0	23,709	Son 62', Sam 89'	
R16	4 December 2013	19:00	A	SC Freiburg	2–1	16,400	Kruse 1', Can 77'	
QF	12 February 2014	19:00	H	1. FC Kaiserslautern	0–1 (a.e.t.)	25,244		

== Champions League ==
In the 2012–13 season, Bayer Leverkusen finished in third place in the Bundesliga. As the third place team, they qualified for the group stage of Champions League. The draw for the Champions League Group Stage happened on 29 August. Bayer Leverkusen were drawn into Group A against Manchester United, Shakhtar Donetsk, and Real Sociedad. Bayer Leverkusen kicked off their Champions League campaign on 17 September against Manchester United. Manchester United won 4–2. Bayer Leverkusen's goalscorers were Simon Rolfes and Ömer Toprak. Manchester United goalscorers were Wayne Rooney, Robin van Persie, and Antonio Valencia. Wayne Rooney scored two goals and got his 200th goal for Manchester United in the match. Bayer Leverkusen finished matchday one in third place in the Group A table. Bayer Leverkusen faced Real Sociedad on matchday two on 2 October. Bayer Leverkusen won 2–1. Simon Rolfes and Jens Hegeler scored for Bayer Leverkusen. Carlos Vela scored for Real Sociedad. Bayer Leverkusen finished match day two in third place. Shakhtar Donetsk on 23 October. Bayer Leverkusen won 4–0 with goals from Stefan Kießling (2 goals), Simon Rolfes, and Sidney Sam. Shakhtar Donetsk on matchday four on 5 November. The match ended in a 0–0 draw. Bayer Leverkusen finished the matchday in second place. Bayer Leverkusen faced Manchester United on matchday five on 27 November. Manchester United won 5–0. Antonio Valencia, Emir Spahić (own goal), Jonny Evans, Chris Smalling, and Nani scored for Manchester United. Bayer Leverkusen finished the matchday in third place. The next game was vs Real Sociedad on 10 December. Bayer Leverkusen won 1–0 with a goal from Ömer Toprak. Bayer Leverkusen finished the matchday in second place and qualified for the round of 16. The draw for the round of 16 took place on 16 December. Bayer Leverkusen were drawn against Paris Saint-Germain. The first leg was played on 18 February. Paris Saint-Germain won 4–0 with goals from Blaise Matuidi, Zlatan Ibrahimović (2 goals), and Yohan Cabaye.

=== Group stage ===
==== Group results ====
Win Draw Loss Postponed

Champions League group stage match details
Match	Date	Time	Opponent	Venue	Result F–A	Scorers	Attendance	League position	Ref.
1	17 September 2013	20:45	Manchester United	A	2–4	Rolfes 54', Toprak 88'	75,811	3rd	
2	2 October 2013	20:45	Real Sociedad	H	2–1	Rolfes 45+1', Hegeler 90+2'	27,462	3rd	
3	23 October 2013	20:45	Shakhtar Donetsk	H	4–0	Kießling 22', 72', Rolfes 50' (pen.), Sam 57'	30,000	2nd	
4	5 November 2013	20:45	Shakhtar Donetsk	A	0–0		50,115	2nd	
5	27 November 2013	20:45	Manchester United	H	0–5		29,412	3rd	
6	10 December 2013	20:45	Real Sociedad	A	1–0	Toprak 49'	23,408	2nd	

==== Group table ====
Pos	Team	Pld	W	D	L	GF	GA	GD	Pts	Qualification	MUN	LEV	SHK	RSO
1	(England) Manchester United	6	4	2	0	12	3	+9	14	Advance to knockout phase	—	4–2	1–0	1–0
2	(Germany) Bayer Leverkusen	6	3	1	2	9	10	−1	10	Advance to knockout phase	0–5	—	4–0	2–1
3	(Ukraine) Shakhtar Donetsk	6	2	2	2	7	6	+1	8	Transfer to Europa League	1–1	0–0	—	4–0
4	(Spain) Real Sociedad	6	0	1	5	1	10	−9	1		0–0	0–1	0–2	—

Source: UEFA

=== Knockout phase ===
Win Draw Loss Postponed

Champions League knockout phase match details
Round	Date	Time	Opponent	Venue	Result F–A	Scorers	Attendance	Ref.
Round of 16 first leg	18 February 2014	20:45	Paris Saint-Germain	H	0–4		29,412	
Round of 16 second leg	12 March 2014	20:45	Paris Saint-Germain	A	1–2	Sam 6'	40,000	

== Player information ==
=== Squad & statistics ===
As of 27 February 2014.

No.	Nat.	Player	Total			Bundesliga			DFB-Pokal			Champions League			Ref.
No.	Nat.	Player	App.	Min.	Gls	App.	Min.	Gls	App.	Min.	Gls	App.	Min.	Gls	Ref.
Goalkeepers
1	(Germany)	Bernd Leno	33	3,000	0	22	1,980	0	4	390	0	7	630	0	
22	(United States)	David Yelldell	0	0	0	0	0	0	0	0	0	0	0	0	
25	(Spain)	Andrés Palop	0	0	0	0	0	0	0	0	0	0	0	0	
36	(Germany)	Niklas Lomb	0	0	0	0	0	0	0	0	0	0	0	0	
Defenders
2	(Greece)	Kostas Stafylidis	1	7	0	1	7	0	0	0	0	0	0	0	
4	(Germany)	Philipp Wollscheid	21	1,296	0	15	874	0	3	270	0	3	152	0	
5	(Bosnia and Herzegovina)	Emir Spahić	24	2,009	0	16	1,354	0	2	180	0	6	475	0	
14	(Germany)	Roberto Hilbert	13	1,030	0	10	835	0	1	15	0	2	180	0	
17	(Poland)	Sebastian Boenisch	21	1,778	0	15	1,350	0	2	90	0	4	338	0	
20	(Mexico)	Andrés Guardado	2	210	0	0	0	0	1	120	0	1	90	0	
21	(Turkey)	Ömer Toprak	29	2,569	2	19	1,639	0	3	300	0	7	630	2	
26	(Italy)	Giulio Donati	25	1,975	0	16	1,135	0	4	390	0	5	450	0	
Midfielders
3	(Germany)	Stefan Reinartz	20	1,606	0	13	1,042	0	3	270	0	4	294	0	
6	(Germany)	Simon Rolfes	30	2,548	6	19	1,595	3	4	367	0	7	586	3	
8	(Germany)	Lars Bender	28	2,218	3	18	1,415	2	4	336	1	6	467	0	
10	(Germany)	Emre Can	26	1,898	2	17	1,195	1	3	300	1	6	403	0	
13	(Germany)	Jens Hegeler	25	858	1	17	641	0	3	114	0	5	103	1	
15	(Germany)	Levin Öztunalı	5	38	0	5	38	0	0	0	0	0	0	0	
18	(Germany)	Sidney Sam	24	1,723	12	16	1,146	8	3	172	3	5	405	1	
23	(Australia)	Robbie Kruse	21	632	3	15	389	2	2	164	1	4	79	0	
27	(Germany)	Gonzalo Castro	27	2,225	2	19	1,675	2	3	121	0	5	429	0	
32	(Germany)	Jonas Meffert	0	0	0	0	0	0	0	0	0	0	0	0	
Forwards
7	(South Korea)	Son Heung-min	30	2,217	10	19	1,401	8	4	330	2	7	486	0	
9	(Switzerland)	Eren Derdiyok	15	352	1	8	175	1	3	127	0	4	50	0	
11	(Germany)	Stefan Kießling	33	2,717	14	22	1,854	10	4	263	2	7	600	2	
19	(Germany)	Julian Brandt	3	68	0	2	24	0	0	0	0	1	44	0	
24	(South Korea)	Ryu Seung-Woo	1	7	0	1	7	0	0	0	0	0	0	0	
Players who left the club after the start the season.
31	(Germany)	Dominik Kohr	4	12	0	2	3	0	0	0	0	2	10	0	
			—			—		—	—			—			—

== Kits ==
Home	Away	Third

Type	Shirt	Shorts	Socks	First appearance / Info
Home	Black	Black	Black	
Away	Red	Red	Red	
Third	White	White	White	

== Notes ==
- 1.Kickoff time in Central European Time/Central European Summer Time.
- 2.Bayer Leverkusen goals first.
