= 2009–10 Bayer 04 Leverkusen season =

Bayer Leverkusen
2009–10 season
- Head coach: Jupp Heynckes
- Stadium: BayArena
- Bundesliga: 4th
- DFB-Pokal: Second round
- Top goalscorer: League: Stefan Kießling (21); All: Stefan Kießling (21)
Home colours	Away colours	Third colours

The 2009–10 Bayer 04 Leverkusen season happened between 31 July 2009 and 8 May 2010. Bayer Leverkusen participated in the Bundesliga and DFB-Pokal.

== Season overview ==
=== August ===
Bayer Leverkusen started the 2009–10 season on 31 July 2009 in the DFB-Pokal. Bayer Leverkusen defeated SV Babelsberg 1–0 in the first round on 31 July 2009. Eren Derdiyok scored the only goal of the match. Bayer Leverkusen's opening match of the Bundesliga happened on 8 August 2009 against 1. FSV Mainz 05. The match finished in a 2–2 draw. Eren Derdiyok and Stefan Kießling scored for Bayer Leverkusen. Tim Hoogland and Daniel Gunkel scored for Mainz. Bayer Leverkusen finished matchday one tied for eighth place. Matchday two happened on 15 August 2009 against 1899 Hoffenheim. Bayer Leverkusen won 1–0 with a goal from Stefan Kießling. Bayer Leverkusen finished matchday two in sixth place. Matchday three happened on 22 August 2009 against SC Freiburg. Bayer Leverkusen won the match 5–0. Eren Derdiyok scored two goals, Tranquillo Barnetta scored two goals, and Stefan Kießling scored a goal. Bayer Leverkusen finished matchday three in first place. Matchday four happened on 29 August 2009 against VfL Bochum. Bayer Leverkusen won 2–1. Manuel Friedrich and Stefan Kießling scored for Bayer Leverkusen. Bochum's goal came from an own goal from Manuel Friedrich. Bayer Leverkusen finished matchday four in second place.

=== September ===
Matchday five happened on 12 September 2009 against VfL Wolfsburg. Bayer Leverkusen won 3–2. Simon Rolfes and Stefan Kießling scored for Bayer Leverkusen. Rolfes scored two goals, including one from the penalty spot. Wolfsburg got goals from Zvjezdan Misimović and Grafite, who scored from the penalty spot. Bayer Leverkusen striker Eren Derdiyok and Wolfsburg goalkeeper Diego Benaglio were sent-off. Bayer Leverkusen finished matchday five in second place. Matchday six happened on 20 September 2009 against Werder Bremen. The match finished in a 0–0 draw. After matchday six, Bayer Leverkusen were in second place. On 23 September 2009, Bayer Leverkusen were defeated 2–1 by 1. FC Kaiserslautern in the second round of the DFB-Pokal. Kaiserslautern took a 2–0 lead with goals from Sidney Sam and Erik Jendrišek. Theofanis Gekas scored late in the match to pull a goal back for Bayer Leverkusen. Matchday seven happened on 26 September 2009 against 1. FC Köln. Bayer Leverkusen won 1–0 with a goal from Simon Rolfes. Köln midfielder Maniche was sent-off during the match. Bayer Leverkusen finished matchday seven in second place.

=== October ===
Matchday eight happened on 3 October 2009 against 1. FC Nürnberg. Bayer Leverkusen won 4–0 with goals from Toni Kroos, Simon Rolfes, Eren Derdiyok, and Stefan Kießling. Bayer Leverkusen finished matchday eight in first place. Matchday nine happened on 17 October 2009 against Hamburger SV. The match finished in a 0–0 draw. After matchday nine, Bayer Leverkusen were in first place. Matchday 10 happened on 23 October 2009 against Borussia Dortmund. The match finished 1–1. Manuel Friedrich scored for Bayer Leverkusen and Lucas Barrios scored for Borussia Dortmund. Bayer Leverkusen finished matchday 10 in first place. Matchday 11 happened on 31 October 2009 against FC Schalke. The match finished in a 2–2 draw. Toni Kroos and Stefan Kießling scored for Bayer Leverkusen and Kevin Kuranyi and Vicente Sánchez scored for Schalke. Bayer Leverkusen finished matchday 11 in first place.

=== November ===
Matchday 12 happened on 6 November 2009 against Eintracht Frankfurt. Bayer Leverkusen won 4–0 with goals from Stefan Kießling, Stefan Reinartz, Toni Kroos, and Lars Bender. Bayer Leverkusen finished matchday 12 in first place. Matchday 13 happened on 22 November 2009 against Bayern Munich. The match finished in a 1–1 draw. Stefan Kießling scored for Bayer Leverkusen and Mario Gómez scored for Bayern Munich. Bayer Leverkusen finished matchday 13 in first place. Matchday 14 happened on 29 November 2009 against VfB Stuttgart. Bayer Leverkusen won 4–0 with three goals from Stefan Kießling and a goal from Eren Derdiyok. Bayer Leverkusen finished matchday 14 in first place.

=== December and January ===
Matchday 15 happened on 5 December 2009 against Hannover 96. The match finished in a 0–0 draw. Bayer Leverkusen finished matchday 15 in first place. Matchday 16 happened on 11 December 2009 against Hertha BSC. The match finished in a 2–2 draw. Toni Kroos and Burak Kaplan scored for Bayer Leverkusen. Adrián Ramos scored two goals for Hertha BSC. Gojko Kacar was sent-off during the match. Bayer Leverkusen finished matchday 16 in first place. Matchday 17 happened on 19 December 2009 against Borussia Mönchengladbach. Bayer Leverkusen won the match 3–2. Bayer Leverkusen got two goals from Toni Kroos and a goal from Eren Derdiyok. Roel Brouwers and Dante scored for Borussia Mönchengladbach. Bayer Leverkusen finished matchday 17 in first place. Matchday 18 happened on 16 January 2010 against Mainz. Bayer Leverkusen won 4–2. Michal Kadlec, Tranquillo Barnetta, Toni Kroos, and Eren Derdiyok scored for Bayer Leverkusen. Tim Hoogland and Niko Bungert scored for Mainz. Bayer Leverkusen finished matchday 18 in first place. Matchday 19 happened on 24 January 2010 against 1899 Hoffenheim. Bayer Leverkusen won 3–0 with goals from Sami Hyypiä, Toni Kroos, and Tranquillo Barnetta. Bayer Leverkusen finished matchday 19 in first place. Matchday 20 happened on 31 January 2010 against Freiburg. Bayer Leverkusen won 3–1. Stefan Kießling, Eren Derdiyok, and Sami Hyypiä scored for Bayer Leverkusen. Felix Bastians scored for Freiburg. Bayer Leverkusen finished matchday 20 in first place.

=== February ===
Matchday 21 happened on 6 February 2010 against Bochum. The match finished in a 1–1 draw. Eren Derdiyok scored for Bayer Leverkusen. Zlatko Dedić scored for Bochum. Bayer Leverkusen finished matchday 21 in first place. Matchday 22 happened on 13 February 2010 against Wolfsburg. Bayer Leverkusen 2–1. Bayer Leverkusen finished matchday 22 in first place. Matchday 23 happened on 21 February 2010 against Werder Bremen. The match finished in a 2–2 draw. Eren Derdiyok and Toni Kroos scored for Bayer Leverkusen. Claudio Pizarro and Per Mertesacker scored for Werder Bremen. Bayer Leverkusen finished matchday 23 in first place. Matchday 24 happened on 27 February 2010 against Köln. The match finished in a 0–0 draw. Bayer Leverkusen finished matchday 24 in second place.

=== March ===
Matchday 25 happened on 7 March 2010 against Nürnberg. Bayer Leverkusen lost the match 3–2. This was Bayer Leverkusen's first loss of the season. Stefan Kießling and Patrick Helmes scored for Bayer Leverkusen. Nürnberg got two goals from Eric Maxim Choupo-Moting and a goal from Mickaël Tavares. Bayer Leverkusen finished matchday 25 in third place. Matchday 26 happened on 14 March 2010 against Hamburg. Bayer Leverkusen won the match 4–2. Bayer Leverkusen got two goals from Stefan Kießling, a goal from Eren Derdiyok, and a goal from Gonzalo Castro. Zé Roberto and David Rozehnal scored for Hamburg. Bayer Leverkusen finished matchday 26 in third place. Matchday 27 happened on 20 March 2010 against Borussia Dortmund. Borussia Dortmund won the match 3–0 with two goals from Lucas Barrios and a goal from Dimitar Rangelov. Bayer Leverkusen finished matchday 27 in third place. Matchday 28 happened on 27 March 2010 against Schalke. Schalke won 2–0 with two goals by Kevin Kuranyi. Bayer Leverkusen finished matchday 28 in third place.

=== April and May ===
Matchday 29 happened on 3 April 2010 against Eintracht Frankfurt. Bayer Leverkusen lost 3–2. Stefan Kießling scored twice for Bayer Leverkusen. Eintracht Frankfurt got goals from Selim Teber, who scored from the penalty spot; Caio; and Maik Franz. Daniel Schwaab was sent-off during the match. Bayer Leverkusen finished matchday 29 in third place. Matchday 30 happened on 10 April 2010 against Bayern Munich. The match finished in a 1–1 draw. Arturo Vidal scored for Bayer Leverkusen and Arjen Robben scored for Bayern Munich. Bayer Leverkusen finished matchday 30 in third place. Matchday 31 happened on 17 April 2010 against Stuttgart. Bayer Leverkusen lost the match 2–1. Stefan Kießling scored for Bayer Leverkusen and Cacau scored two goals for Stuttgart. Tranquillo Barnetta was sent-off during the match. Bayer Leverkusen finished matchday 31 in fourth place. Matchday 32 happened on 24 April 2010 against Hannover. Bayer Leverkusen won the match 3–0 with two goals from Stefan Kießling and a goal from Burak Kaplan. Bayer Leverkusen finished matchday 32 in fourth place. Matchday 33 happened on 1 May 2010 against Hertha BSC. The match finished in a 1–1 draw. Manuel Friedrich scored for Bayer Leverkusen and Raffael scored for Hertha BSC. Bayer Leverkusen finished the matchday 33 in fourth place. Matchday 34, the final matchday, happened on 8 May 2010 against Borussia Mönchengladbach. The match finished in a 1–1 draw. Patrick Helmes scored for Bayer Leverkusen and Roel Brouwers scored for Borussia Mönchengladbach. Bayer Leverkusen finished the league season in fourth place.

== Competitive matches ==
=== Bundesliga ===
==== Results summary ====
Overall								Home						Away					
Pld	W	D	L	GF	GA	GD	Pts	W	D	L	GF	GA	GD	W	D	L	GF	GA	GD
34	15	14	5	65	38	+27	59	11	5	1	37	14	+23	4	9	4	28	24	+4

Last updated: 14 February 2018.
Source: kicker.de

==== Bundesliga results ====
MD	Date	H/A	Opponent	Res. F–A	Att.	Goalscorers		Table		Ref.
MD	Date	H/A	Opponent	Res. F–A	Att.	Bayer Leverkusen	Opponent	Pos.	Pts.	Ref.
1	8 Aug	A	Mainz	2–2	20,000	Derdiyok 42'; Kießling 43'	Hoogland 5'; Gunkel 82'	T8	1	
2	15 Aug	H	1899 Hoffenheim	1–0	28,000	Kießling 67'	—	6	4	
3	22 Aug	A	Freiburg	5–0	22,000	Kießling 35'; Barnetta 47', 76'; Derdiyok 70', 84'	—	1	7	
4	29 Aug	H	Bochum	2–1	27,122	Friedrich 41'; Kießling 68'	Friedrich 32' (o.g.)	2	10	
5	12 Sep	A	Wolfsburg	3–2	30,000	Rolfes 38', 52' (pen.); Kießling 58'	Misimović 76'; Grafite 80' (pen.)	2	13	
6	20 Sep	H	Werder Bremen	0–0	30,210	—	—	2	14	
7	26 Sep	A	Köln	1–0	49,300	Rolfes 82'	—	2	17	
8	3 Oct	H	Nürnberg	4–0	26,785	Kroos 2'; Rolfes 28'; Derdiyok 34'; Kießling 68'	—	1	20	
9	17 Oct	A	Hamburg	0–0	57,000	—	—	1	21	
10	23 Oct	H	Borussia Dortmund	1–1	30,210	Friedrich 64'	Barrios 8'	1	22	
11	31 Oct	A	Schalke	2–2	61,673	Kroos 29'; Kießling 44'	Kuranyi 83'; Sánchez 88'	1	23	
12	6 Nov	H	Eintracht Frankfurt	4–0	30,000	Kießling 2'; Reinartz 6'; Kroos 11'; Bender 86'	—	1	26	
13	22 Nov	A	Bayern Munich	1–1	69,000	Kießling 14'	Gómez 8'	1	27	
14	29 Nov	H	Stuttgart	4–0	30,210	Kießling 22', 59', 87' (pen.); Derdiyok 39'	—	1	30	
15	5 Dec	A	Hannover	0–0	34,341	—	—	1	31	
16	11 Dec	A	Hertha BSC	2–2	40,474	Kroos 76'; Kaplan 90'	Ramos 8', 92'	1	32	
17	19 Dec	H	Borussia Mönchengladbach	3–2	30,210	Kroos 18', 69'; Derdiyok 60'	Brouwers 37'; Dante 54'	1	35	
18	16 Jan	H	Mainz	4–2	28,000	Kadlec 15'; Barnetta 19'; Kroos 30'; Derdiyok 88'	Hoodland 8'; Bungert 67'	1	38	
19	24 Jan	A	1899 Hoffenheim	3–0	29,500	Hyypiä 11'; Kroos 51'; Barnetta 71'	—	1	41	
20	31 Jan	H	Freiburg	3–1	26,000	Kießling 36'; Derdiyok 37'; Hyypiä 40'	Bastians 66'	1	44	
21	6 Feb	A	Bochum	1–1	22,176	Derdiyok 45'	Dedić 68'	1	45	
22	13 Feb	H	Wolfsburg	2–1	30,000	Reinartz 48'; Derdiyok 68'	Džeko 79'	1	48	
23	21 Feb	A	Werder Bremen	2–2	37,500	Derdiyok 29'; Kroos 57'	Pizarro 34'; Mertesacker 92'	1	49	
24	27 Feb	H	Köln	0–0	30,210	—	—	2	50	
25	7 Mar	A	Nürnberg	2–3	40,329	Kießling 66'; Helmes 73'	Choupo-Moting 42', 45'; Tavares 55'	3	50	
26	14 Mar	H	Hamburg	4–2	30,210	Kießling 22', 62'; Derdiyok 55'; Castro 84'	Roberto 33'; Rozehnal 83'	3	53	
27	20 Mar	A	Borussia Dortmund	0–3	80,100	—	Barrios 50', 60'; Rangelov 87'	3	53	
28	27 Mar	H	Schalke	0–2	30,210	—	Kuranyi 11', 27'	3	53	
29	3 Apr	A	Eintracht Frankfurt	2–3	50,900	Kießling 33', 46'	Teber 28' (pen.); Caio 62'; Franz 89'	3	53	
30	10 Apr	H	Bayern Munich	1–1	30,210	Vidal 59'	Robben 51' (pen.)	3	54	
31	17 Apr	A	Stuttgart	1–2	41,500	Kießling 13'	Cacau 29', 85'	4	54	
32	24 Apr	H	Hannover	3–0	30,210	Kießling 26', 88' (pen.); Kaplan 64'	—	4	57	
33	1 May	H	Hertha BSC	1–1	30,210	Friedrich 59'	Raffael 12'	4	58	
34	8 May	A	Borussia Mönchengladbach	1–1	54,057	Helmes 34'	Brouwers 55'	4	59	

=== DFB-Pokal ===
Rd	Date	H/A	Opponent	Res. F–A	Att.	Goalscorers		Ref.
Rd	Date	H/A	Opponent	Res. F–A	Att.	Bayer Leverkusen	Opponent	Ref.
1	31 Jul	A	Babelsberg	1–0	6,157	Derdiyok 67'	—	
2	23 Sep	A	Kaiserslautern	1–2	33,712	Gekas 86'	Sam 12'; Jendrišek 62'	

== Squad statistics ==
=== Appearances and goals ===
No.	Pos	Nat	Player	Total		Bundesliga		DFB-Pokal	
No.	Pos	Nat	Player	Apps	Goals	Apps	Goals	Apps	Goals
1	GK	(Germany) GER	René Adler	33	0	31	0	2	0
21	GK	(Poland) POL	Tomasz Bobel	0	0	0	0	0	0
22	GK	(Germany) GER	Benedikt Fernandez	0	0	0	0	0	0
36	GK	(Germany) GER	Fabian Giefer	3	0	3	0	0	0
5	DF	(Germany) GER	Manuel Friedrich	33	3	31	3	2	0
4	DF	(Finland) FIN	Sami Hyypiä	33	2	32	2	1	0
24	DF	(Czech Republic) CZE	Michal Kadlec	24	1	23	1	1	0
15	DF	(Ghana) GHA	Hans Sarpei	13	0	12	0	1	0
2	DF	(Germany) GER	Daniel Schwaab	29	0	27	0	2	0
20	DF	(Germany) GER	Lukas Sinkiewicz (Note: Sinkiewicz was born in Tychy, Poland, but also qualified to represent Germany internationally and represented Germany at U-19 and U-21 level before making his international debut for Germany in September 2005.)	7	0	7	0	0	0
26	DF	(Togo) TOG	Assimiou Touré (Note: Touré was born in Sokodé, Togo, but also qualified to represent Germany internationally and represented Germany at U-18 level before making his international debut for Togo in 2006.)	1	0	1	0	0	0
7	MF	(Switzerland) SUI	Tranquillo Barnetta	34	4	32	4	2	0
8	MF	(Germany) GER	Lars Bender	21	1	20	1	1	0
27	MF	(Germany) GER	Gonzalo Castro (Note: Castro was born in Wuppertal, West Germany (now Germany), and represented Germany at U-21 level, but also qualified to represent Spain internationally through his parents and represented Spain at U-19 level before making his international debut for Germany in March 2007.)	30	1	29	1	1	0
33	MF	(Germany) GER	Pierre De Wit	0	0	0	0	0	0
45	MF	(Germany) GER	Dominick Drexler	0	0	0	0	0	0
14	MF	(Germany) GER	Sascha Dum	0	0	0	0	0	0
28	MF	(Turkey) TUR	Burak Kaplan (Note: Kaplan was born in Cologne, West Germany (now Germany), but also qualified to represent Turkey internationally and represented Turkey at U-16, U-19, and U-21 level.)	4	2	4	2	0	0
37	MF	(Slovenia) SVN	Kevin Kampl (Note: Kampl was born in Solingen, Germany, but also qualified to represent Slovenia internationally through his parents and represented Slovenia at U-20 and U-21 level before making his international debut for Slovenia in October 2012.)	0	0	0	0	0	0
39	MF	(Germany) GER	Toni Kroos	35	9	33	9	2	0
26	MF	(Greece) GRE	Thanos Petsos (Note: Petsos was born in Düsseldorf, Germany, but also qualified to represent Greece internationally and represented Greece at U-17, U-19, and U-21 level before making his international debut for Greece in August 2011.)	1	0	1	0	0	0
3	MF	(Germany) GER	Stefan Reinartz	29	2	27	2	2	0
10	MF	(Brazil) BRA	Renato Augusto	18	0	17	0	1	0
6	MF	(Germany) GER	Simon Rolfes	13	4	11	4	2	0
23	MF	(Chile) CHI	Arturo Vidal	32	1	31	1	1	0
18	MF	(Poland) POL	Tomasz Zdebel	0	0	0	0	0	0
19	FW	(Switzerland) SUI	Eren Derdiyok	35	13	33	12	2	1
29	FW	(Greece) GRE	Theofanis Gekas	8	1	6	0	2	1
9	FW	(Germany) GER	Patrick Helmes	12	2	12	2	0	0
11	FW	(Germany) GER	Stefan Kießling	35	21	33	21	2	0
54	FW	(Germany) GER	Pierre-Michel Lasogga	0	0	0	0	0	0
17	FW	(Germany) GER	Richard Sukuta-Pasu	0	0	0	0	0	0

=== Bookings ===
Player	Total			Bundesliga			DFB-Pokal			Ref.
Player	Booked	(yellow card) (red card)	Sent off (straight red)	Booked	(yellow card) (red card)	Sent off (straight red)	Booked	(yellow card) (red card)	Sent off (straight red)	Ref.
René Adler	2	0	0	2	0	0	0	0	0	
Fabian Giefer	0	0	0	0	0	0	0	0	0	
Manuel Friedrich	5	0	0	5	0	0	0	0	0	
Sami Hyypiä	7	0	0	7	0	0	0	0	0	
Michal Kadlec	3	0	0	3	0	0	0	0	0	
Hans Sarpei	1	0	0	1	0	0	0	0	0	
Daniel Schwaab	5	0	1	5	0	1	0	0	0	
Lukas Sinkiewicz	1	0	0	1	0	0	0	0	0	
Assimiou Touré	0	0	0	0	0	0	0	0	0	
Tranquillo Barnetta	3	1	0	3	1	0	0	0	0	
Lars Bender	0	0	0	0	0	0	0	0	0	
Gonzalo Castro	4	0	0	4	0	0	0	0	0	
Burak Kaplan	0	0	0	0	0	0	0	0	0	
Toni Kroos	6	0	0	6	0	0	0	0	0	
Thanos Petsos	0	0	0	0	0	0	0	0	0	
Stefan Reinartz	7	0	0	7	0	0	0	0	0	
Renato Augusto	1	0	0	1	0	0	0	0	0	
Simon Rolfes	2	0	0	2	0	0	0	0	0	
Arturo Vidal	15	0	0	14	0	0	1	0	0	
Eren Derdiyok	3	1	0	3	1	0	0	0	0	
Theofanis Gekas	0	0	0	0	0	0	0	0	0	
Patrick Helmes	0	0	0	0	0	0	0	0	0	
Stefan Kießling	3	0	0	3	0	0	0	0	0	
Totals	68	1	1	67	1	1	1	0	0	—
