= 2010–11 Bayer 04 Leverkusen season =

Bayer 04 Leverkusen
2010–11 season
- President: Wolfgang Holzhäueser
- Head coach: Jupp Heynckes
- Stadium: BayArena
- Bundesliga: 2nd
- DFB-Pokal: Second round
- UEFA Europa League: Round of 16
- Top goalscorer: League: Arturo Vidal (10); All: Arturo Vidal (14)
Home colours	Away colours	Third colours

The 2010–11 season of Bayer 04 Leverkusen began on 14 August 2010 with a DFB-Pokal match against FK Pirmasens, and ended on 14 May 2011, the last matchday of the Bundesliga, with a match against SC Freiburg. Leverkusen were eliminated in the second round of the DFB-Pokal and the round of 16 in the UEFA Europa League. They finished the season in second place in the Bundesliga.

== Transfers ==
=== Summer transfers ===
In:

No.	Pos.	Nation	Player
13	MF	GER	Michael Ballack (from Chelsea F.C.)
14	MF	GER	Hanno Balitsch (from Hannover 96)
18	MF	GER	Sidney Sam (from Hamburger SV, previously on loan at 1. FC Kaiserslautern)
17	MF	CRO	Domagoj Vida (from NK Osijek)
31	MF	DEN	Nicolai Jørgensen (from Akademisk Boldklub)
--	MF	CRO	Zvonko Pamić (from NK Karlovac)

Out:

No.	Pos.	Nation	Player
14	MF	GER	Sascha Dum (to Fortuna Düsseldorf, previously on loan at FC Energie Cottbus)
15	MF	GHA	Hans Sarpei (to FC Schalke 04)
18	MF	POL	Tomasz Zdebel (to Alemannia Aachen)
20	DF	GER	Lukas Sinkiewicz (to FC Augsburg)
21	MF	GER	Marcel Risse (on loan to 1. FSV Mainz 05, previously on loan at 1. FC Nürnberg)
29	FW	GRE	Theofanis Gekas (to Eintracht Frankfurt, previously on loan at Hertha BSC)
39	MF	GER	Toni Kroos (loan return to FC Bayern Munich)
45	DF	GER	Jens Hegeler (on loan to 1. FC Nürnberg, previously on loan at FC Augsburg)
--	DF	GRE	Athanasios Petsos (on loan to 1. FC Kaiserslautern)
--	MF	CRO	Zvonko Pamić (on loan to SC Freiburg)

=== Winter transfers ===
In:

No.	Pos.	Nation	Player
12	FW	UKR	Andriy Voronin (to Liverpool)
37	MF	SLO	Kevin Kampl (from SpVgg Greuther Fürth)
--	MF	JPN	Hajime Hosogai (from Urawa Red Diamonds)

Out:

No.	Pos.	Nation	Player
9	FW	GER	Patrick Helmes (to VfL Wolfsburg)
28	MF	TUR	Burak Kaplan (on loan to SpVgg Greuther Fürth)
--	MF	JPN	Hajime Hosogai (on loan to FC Augsburg)
--	DF	BRA	Lucas (on loan to 1. FC Kaiserslautern, previously on loan at Portuguesa)

== Goals and appearances ==
No.	Pos	Nat	Player	Total		Bundesliga		UEFA Europa League		DFB-Pokal	
No.	Pos	Nat	Player	Apps	Goals	Apps	Goals	Apps	Goals	Apps	Goals
1	GK	(Germany) GER	René Adler	43	0	32	0	9	0	2	0
22	GK	(Germany) GER	Benedikt Fernandez	0	0	0	0	0	0	0	0
33	GK	(Poland) POL	Tomasz Bobel	0	0	0	0	0	0	0	0
36	GK	(Germany) GER	Fabian Giefer	4	0	2	0	2	0	0	0
2	DF	(Germany) GER	Daniel Schwaab	39	0	30	0	7	0	2	0
3	DF	(Germany) GER	Stefan Reinartz	42	3	31	2	9	1	2	0
4	DF	(Finland) FIN	Sami Hyypiä	26	1	21	1	4	0	1	0
5	DF	(Germany) GER	Manuel Friedrich	30	0	19	0	9	0	2	0
17	DF	(Croatia) CRO	Domagoj Vida	8	0	1	0	7	0	0	0
20	DF	(Germany) GER	Danny da Costa	2	0	0	0	2	0	0	0
24	DF	(Czech Republic) CZE	Michal Kadlec	42	5	32	2	8	3	2	0
27	DF	(Germany) GER	Gonzalo Castro	31	6	23	3	7	3	1	0
6	MF	(Germany) GER	Simon Rolfes	37	6	30	5	6	1	1	0
7	MF	(Switzerland) SUI	Tranquillo Barnetta	31	2	24	2	6	0	1	0
8	MF	(Germany) GER	Lars Bender	40	3	27	3	11	0	2	0
10	MF	(Brazil) BRA	Renato Augusto	34	8	27	7	6	0	1	1
13	MF	(Germany) GER	Michael Ballack	19	2	17	0	2	2	0	0
14	MF	(Germany) GER	Hanno Balitsch	33	3	24	3	8	0	1	0
18	MF	(Germany) GER	Sidney Sam	38	12	29	7	7	3	2	2
23	MF	(Chile) CHI	Arturo Vidal	44	14	33	10	9	2	2	2
26	MF	(Slovenia) SLO	Kevin Kampl	1	0	0	0	1	0	0	0
28	MF	(Turkey) TUR	Burak Kaplan	5	0	0	0	5	0	0	0
9	FW	(Germany) GER	Patrick Helmes	24	12	15	5	7	4	2	3
11	FW	(Germany) GER	Stefan Kießling	28	9	22	7	5	0	1	2
19	FW	(Switzerland) SUI	Eren Derdiyok	43	11	32	6	9	2	2	3
31	FW	(Denmark) DEN	Nicolai Jørgensen	18	0	9	0	8	0	1	0

Last updated: 14 May 2011

== Competitions ==
=== Bundesliga ===
Win Draw Loss

Note: Scores are given with Bayer Leverkusen score listed first.

Game	Date	Venue	Opponent	Result F–A	Attendance	Bayer Leverkusen scorers
1	22 August 2010	A	Borussia Dortmund	2–0	73,300	Barnetta 19', Renato Augusto 22'
2	29 August 2010	H	Borussia Mönchengladbach	3–6	30,210	Derdiyok 24', Vidal 58' (pen.), Kießling 70'
3	11 September 2010	A	Hannover 96	2–2	40,852	Derdiyok 62', Helmes 90'
4	19 September 2010	H	1. FC Nürnberg	0–0	23,963
5	22 September 2010	H	Eintracht Frankfurt	2–1	24,404	Bender 9', Vidal 90' (pen.)
6	25 September 2010	A	VfB Stuttgart	4–1	38,300	Hyypiä 19', Vidal 21', Balitsch 69', Sam 88'
7	3 October 2010	H	Werder Bremen	2–2	30,210	Helmes 16', Derdiyok 78'
8	16 October 2010	A	VfL Wolfsburg	3–2	25,000	Rolfes 72', 82', Vidal 74' (pen.)
9	24 October 2010	H	1. FSV Mainz 05	0–1	27,000
10	30 October 2010	A	FC Schalke 04	1–0	61,673	Sam 65'
11	7 November 2010	H	1. FC Kaiserslautern	3–1	29,794	Sam 38', 84', Helmes 68'
12	13 November 2010	A	FC St. Pauli	1–0	24,000	Renato Augusto 81'
13	20 November 2010	H	Bayern Munich	1–1	30,200	Vidal 45+2' (pen.)
14	27 November 2010	A	1899 Hoffenheim	2–2	30,000	Sam 8', Vidal 10' (pen.)
15	5 December 2010	H	1. FC Köln	3–2	30,210	Helmes 21', Barnetta 55', Reinartz 61'
16	11 December 2010	A	Hamburger SV	4–2	51,225	Sam 30', Vidal 61', Renato Augusto 66', 78'
17	19 December 2010	H	SC Freiburg	2–2	23,000	Vidal 16' (pen.), Helmes 75'
18	14 January 2011	H	Borussia Dortmund	1–3	30,210	Kießling 80'
19	23 January 2011	A	Borussia Mönchengladbach	3–1	36,696	Kadlec 27', Castro 45', 73'
20	28 January 2011	H	Hannover 96	2–0	28,013	Vidal 21', Rolfes 42'
21	5 February 2011	A	1. FC Nürnberg	0–1	34,113
22	12 February 2011	H	Eintracht Frankfurt	3–0	50,138	Rolfes 9', Renato Augusto 32', Balitsch 84'
23	20 February 2011	H	VfB Stuttgart	4–2	28,800	Kießling 6', 90+1', Castro 41', Reinartz 81'
24	27 February 2011	A	Werder Bremen	2–2	37,500	Derdiyok 42', Rolfes 67'
25	5 March 2011	H	VfL Wolfsburg	3–0	30,200	Bender 21', Renato Augusto 29', Kießling 45+1'
26	13 March 2011	A	1. FSV Mainz 05	1–0	20,300	Renato Augusto 82'
27	20 March 2011	H	FC Schalke 04	2–0	30,210	Derdiyok 19', Metzelder 27' (o.g.)
28	2 April 2011	A	1. FC Kaiserslautern	1–0	46,050	Sam 74'
29	10 April 2011	H	FC St. Pauli	2–1	30,210	Kießling 66' Bender 77'
30	17 April 2011	A	Bayern Munich	1–5	69,000	Derdiyok 62'
31	23 April 2011	H	1899 Hoffenheim	2–1	29,313	Kadlec 40', Vidal 51'
32	30 April 2011	A	1. FC Köln	0–2	50,000
33	7 May 2011	H	Hamburger SV	1–1	30,210	Kießling 54'
34	14 May 2011	A	SC Freiburg	1–0	24,000	Balitsch 45'

=== DFB-Pokal ===
Win Draw Loss

Note: Scores are given with Bayer Leverkusen score listed first.

Game	Date	Venue	Opponent	Result F–A	Attendance	Bayer Leverkusen scorers
1	14 August 2010	A	FK Pirmasens	11–1	8,245	Kießling 36', 60', Helmes 46', 58', 64', Renato Augusto 62', Sam 67', 88', Derdiyok 84', 90', Vidal 87' (pen.)
2	27 October 2010	A	Borussia Mönchengladbach	1–1 a.e.t. 4–5 pen.	34,517	Derdiyok 108'

=== UEFA Europa League ===
Win Draw Loss

Note: Scores are given with Bayer Leverkusen score listed first.

Game	Date	Venue	Opponent	Result F–A	Attendance	Bayer Leverkusen scorers
PO1	19 August 2010	H	Tavriya Simferopol	3–0	13,000	Kadlec 1', 84', Ballack 90+1' (pen.)
PO2	26 August 2010	A	Tavriya Simferopol	3–1	10,700	Vidal 50' (pen.), Holaydo 75' (o.g.), Castro 90+3'
GS1	16 September 2010	H	Rosenborg BK	4–0	13,500	Helmes 4', 58', 61', Reinartz 38'
GS2	30 September 2010	A	Atlético Madrid	1–1	40,000	Derdiyok 39'
GS3	21 October 2010	A	Aris Thessaloniki	0–0	16,372
GS4	4 November 2010	H	Aris Thessaloniki	1–0	18,265	Vidal 90'
GS5	1 December 2010	A	Rosenborg BK	1–0	11,096	Sam 35'
GS6	16 December 2010	H	Atlético Madrid	1–1	18,093	Helmes 69'
R32, 1	17 February 2011	A	Metalist Kharkiv	4–0	36,633	Derdiyok 23', Castro 72', Sam 90', 90+2'
R32, 2	24 February 2011	H	Metalist Kharkiv	2–0	28,749	Rolfes 47', Ballack 70'
R16, 1	10 March 2011	H	Villarreal	2–3	20,126	Kadlec 33', Castro 72'
R16, 2	17 March 2011	A	Villarreal	1–2	23,000	Derdiyok 82'

== See also ==
- 2010–11 Bundesliga
- 2010–11 DFB-Pokal
- Bayer 04 Leverkusen
