= 2012–13 Bayer 04 Leverkusen season =

Bayer Leverkusen
2012–13 season
- Sporting Director: Rudi Völler
- Head coach: Sami Hyypiä
- Stadium: BayArena
- Bundesliga: 3rd
- DFB-Pokal: Round of 16
- UEFA Europa League: Round of 32
- Top goalscorer: League: Stefan Kießling (25); All: Stefan Kießling (27)
Home colours	Away colours	Third colours

The 2012–13 Bayer Leverkusen season was the 109th season in the club's football history. In 2012–13, the club played in the Bundesliga, the top tier of German football. It was the club's 34th season in this league, having been promoted from the 2. Bundesliga in 1979.

The club also took part in the 2012–13 edition of the DFB-Pokal.

In Europe the club had qualified for the 2012–13 edition of the UEFA Europa League where it played Metalist Kharkiv, Rapid Wien and Rosenborg in Group K of the group stage.

== Review and events ==
In the 2011–12 season, Bayer Leverkusen finished fifth in the 2011–12 Bundesliga. Therefore the club qualified for the 2012–13 Bundesliga, 2012–13 DFB-Pokal and 2012–13 Europa League.

Bayer Leverkusen rejected a bid for André Schürrle worth €25 million from Chelsea. Bayer Leverkusen has decided not to sell Schürrle because they were "unable to sign a replacement" because suitable replacements are "too expensive" and would be forced to sign "a weaker player" who is "overpriced". Leverkusen CEO Wolfgang Holzhäuser accused Bayern Munich coach of Jupp Heynckes "tapping up" Lars Bender. The club had rejected an "official" offer from Bayern Munich the previous week.

== Matches ==
=== Legend ===
Win Draw Loss Postponed

=== Bundesliga ===
==== League results and fixtures ====
Match	Date	Time	Stadium	City	Opponent	Result^{1}	Attendance	Goalscorers		Table		Source
Match	Date	Time	Stadium	City	Opponent	Result^{1}	Attendance	Bayer 04 Leverkusen	Opponent	Pos.	Pts	Source
1	25 August 2012	15:30	Commerzbank-Arena	Frankfurt	Eintracht Frankfurt	1–2	27,900	Kießling 30'	Aigner 57'; Lanig 82'	T12	0	
2	1 September 2012	15:30	BayArena	Leverkusen	SC Freiburg	2–0	23,635	Castro 8'; Wollscheid 54'	—	T9	3	
3	15 September 2012	15:30	Signal Iduna Park	Dortmund	Borussia Dortmund	0–3	80,645	—	Hummels 29'; Błaszczykowski 39'; Lewandowski 78'	12	3	
4	23 September 2012	15:30	BayArena	Leverkusen	Borussia Mönchengladbach	1–1	27,640	Kadlec 12'	Herrmann 3'	13	4	
5	26 September 2012	20:00	SGL arena	Augsburg	FC Augsburg	3–1	25,211	Kießling 7'; Wollscheid 39'; Schürrle 44'	Werner 51'	8	7	
6	29 September 2012	15:30	BayArena	Leverkusen	Greuther Fürth	2–0	25,700	Sam 50', 62'	—	7	10	
7	7 October 2012	17:30	Mercedes-Benz Arena	Stuttgart	VfB Stuttgart	2–2	47,400	Kießling 13', 59'	Ibišević 19' (pen.), 45'	6	11	
8	20 October 2012	15:30	BayArena	Lueverkusen	Mainz 05	2–2	28,077	Kießling 43'; Castro 87'	Szalai 58'; Risse 76'	5	12	
9	28 October 2012	17:30	Allianz Arena	Munich	Bayern Munich	2–1	71,000	Kießling 42'; Sam 87'	Mandžukić 77'	5	15	
10	4 November 2012	15:30	BayArena	Leverkusen	Fortuna Düsseldorf	3–2	27,153	Sam 16'; Schürrle 41'; Castro 66'	Rafael 40'; Bodzek 86'	4	18	
11	11 November 2012	15:30	Volkswagen-Arena	Wolfsburg	VfL Wolfsburg	1–3	24,825	Kießling 90+1'	Diego 4', 16'; Dost 33'	5	18	
12	17 November 2012	18:30	BayArena	Leverkusen	Schalke 04	2–0	30,000	Schürrle 45'; Kießling 67'	—	5	21	
13	25 November 2012	17:30	Rhein-Neckar Arena	Sinsheim	1899 Hoffenheim	2–1	22,100	Bender 15'; Carvajal 38'	Johnson 59'	5	24	
14	28 November 2012	20:00	Weserstadion	Bremen	Werder Bremen	4–1	37,231	Castro 31', 52'; Rolfes 74'; Hegeler 79'	Petersen 54'	2	27	
15	1 December 2012	15:30	BayArena	Leverkusen	1. FC Nürnberg	1–0	22,000	Kießling 37'	—	2	30	
16	9 December 2012	17:30	AWD-Arena	Hanover	Hannover 96	2–3	45,800	Castro 3'; Kießling 58'	Huszti 20' (pen.), 69' (pen.); Diouf 56'	2	30	
17	15 December 2012	15:30	BayArena	Leverkusen	Hamburger SV	3–0	29,489	Kießling 26', 66'; Schürrle 36'	—	2	33	
18	19 January 2013	15:30	BayArena	Leverkusen	Eintracht Frankfurt	3–1	28,767	Boenisch 31'; Kießling 33'; Schürrle 58'	Meier 78'	2	36	
19	26 January 2013	18:30	Mage Solar Stadion	Freiburg	SC Freiburg	0–0	22,500	—	—	2	37	
20	3 February 2013	17:30	BayArena	Leverkusen	Borussia Dortmund	2–3	30,210	Reinartz 58', 62'	Reus 3'; Błaszczykowski 9' (pen.); Lewandowski 63'	3	37	
21	9 February 2013	15:30	Borussia-Park	Mönchengladbach	Borussia Mönchengladbach	3–3	45,000	Sam 52'; Kießling 60'; Schürrle 64'	Stranzl 44'; De Jong 58'; Herrmann 86'	3	38	
22	16 February 2013	15:30	BayArena	Leverkusen	FC Augsburg	2–1	22,784	Kießling 26'; Bender 75'	Mölders 89'	3	41	
23	24 February 2013	17:30	Trolli Arena	Fürth	Greuther Fürth	0–0	14,635	—	—	3	42	
24	2 March 2013	18:30	BayArena	Leverkusen	VfB Stuttgart	2–1	27,058	Kießling 82' (pen.); Bender 86'	Ibišević 12' (pen.)	3	45	
25	9 March 2013	15:30	Coface Arena	Mainz	Mainz 05	0–1	30,124	—	Ivanschitz 61' (pen.)	3	45	
26	16 March 2013	18:30	BayArena	Leverkusen	Bayern Munich	1–2	30,210	Rolfes 75'	Gómez 37'; Wollscheid 87' (o.g.)	3	45	
27	30 March 2013	15:30	Esprit Arena	Düsseldorf	Fortuna Düsseldorf	4–1	53,265	Kießling 22' (pen.), 88' Schürrle 62', 84'	Schwaab 41' (o.g.)	3	48	
28	6 April 2013	15:30	BayArena	Leverkusen	VfL Wolfsburg	1–1	29,288	Schürrle 12'	Kjær 70'	3	49	
29	13 April 2013	18:30	Veltins-Arena	Gelsenkirchen	Schalke 04	2–2	61,619	Rolfes 39' Kießling 58'	Pukki 71' Raffael 87' (pen.)	3	50	
30	20 April 2013	15:30	BayArena	Leverkusen	1899 Hoffenheim	5–0	28,683	Kießling 16', 65' Schürrle 31', 69' Reinartz 79'	—	3	53	
31	27 April 2013	15:30	BayArena	Leverkusen	Werder Bremen	1–0	30,210	Kießling 35' (pen.)	—	3	56	
32	4 May 2013	15:30	Stadion Nürnberg	Nuremberg	1. FC Nuremberg	2–0	40,581	Toprak 26' Kießling 62' (pen.)	—	3	59	
33	11 May 2013	15:30	BayArena	Leverkusen	Hannover 96	3–1	29,904	Hegeler 6', 60' Kießling 28'	Sobiech 71'	3	62	
34	18 May 2013	15:30	Imtech Arena	Hamburg	Hamburger SV	1–0	57,000	Kießling 90'	—	3	65	

==== League table ====
Pos	Team	Pld	W	D	L	GF	GA	GD	Pts	Qualification or relegation
1	Bayern Munich (C)	34	29	4	1	98	18	+80	91	Qualification for the Champions League group stage
2	Borussia Dortmund	34	19	9	6	81	42	+39	66	Qualification for the Champions League group stage
3	Bayer Leverkusen	34	19	8	7	65	39	+26	65	Qualification for the Champions League group stage
4	Schalke 04	34	16	7	11	58	50	+8	55	Qualification for the Champions League play-off round
5	SC Freiburg	34	14	9	11	45	40	+5	51	Qualification for the Europa League group stage

Source: Bundesliga.de, kicker.de
Rules for classification: 1) points; 2) goal difference; 3) number of goals scored.
(C) Champions

==== League summary table ====
Overall								Home						Away					
Pld	W	D	L	GF	GA	GD	Pts	W	D	L	GF	GA	GD	W	D	L	GF	GA	GD
34	19	8	7	65	39	+26	65	12	3	2	36	15	+21	7	5	5	29	24	+5

Last updated: 8 June 2013.
Source: kicker

=== DFB-Pokal ===
Round	Date	Time	Stadium	City	Opponent	Result^{1}	Attendance	Goalscorers		Source
Round	Date	Time	Stadium	City	Opponent	Result^{1}	Attendance	Bayer 04 Leverkusen	Opponent	Source
1	18 August 2012	15:30	Ernst-Abbe-Sportfeld	Jena	Carl Zeiss Jena	4–0	8,043	Rolfes 3'; Bellarabi 15'; Kießling 81'; Fernandes 90'	—	
2	31 October 2012	19:00	Bielefelder Alm	Bielefeld	Arminia Bielefeld	3–2	24,771	Hegeler 23'; Friedrich 56'; Schürrle 94'	Hille 11'; Schütz 82'	
R16	19 December 2012	19:00	Volkswagen Arena	Wolfsburg	VfL Wolfsburg	1–2	10,781	Fagner 31' (o.g.)	Träsch 78'; Dost 90'	

=== Europa League ===
==== Group stage ====
===== Group results =====
Match	Date	Time	Stadium	City	Opponent	Result^{1}	Attendance	Goalscorers		Table		Source
Match	Date	Time	Stadium	City	Opponent	Result^{1}	Attendance	Bayer 04 Leverkusen	Opponent	Pos.	Pts	Source
1	20 September 2012	21:05	BayArena	Leverkusen, Germany	Metalist Kharkiv	0–0	15,300	—	—	T2	1	
2	4 October 2012	19:00	Lerkendal Stadion	Trondheim, Norway	Rosenborg	1–0	12,587	Kießling 76'	—	2	4	
3	25 October 2012	19:00	Ernst-Happel-Stadion	Vienna, Austria	Rapid Wien	4–0	42,600	Wollscheid 37'; Castro 56', 90+2'; Bellarabi 58'	—	1	7	
4	8 November 2012	21:05	BayArena	Leverkusen, Germany	Rapid Wien	3–0	19,842	Hegeler 4'; Schürrle 53'; Friedrich 66'	—	1	10	
5	22 November 2012	19:00	Metalist Stadium	Kharkiv, Ukraine	Metalist Kharkiv	0–2	39,218	—	Cristaldo 46'; Xavier 85'	2	10	
6	6 December 2012	21:05	BayArena	Leverkusen, Germany	Rosenborg	1–0	10,513	Riedel 65'	—	2	13	

===== Group table =====
Team	Pld	W	D	L	GF	GA	GD	Pts
(Ukraine) Metalist Kharkiv	6	4	1	1	9	3	+6	13
(Germany) Bayer Leverkusen	6	4	1	1	9	2	+7	13
(Norway) Rosenborg	6	2	0	4	7	10	−3	6
(Austria) Rapid Wien	6	1	0	5	4	14	−10	3

===== Group summary table =====
Overall								Home						Away					
Pld	W	D	L	GF	GA	GD	Pts	W	D	L	GF	GA	GD	W	D	L	GF	GA	GD
6	4	1	1	9	2	+7	13	2	1	0	4	0	+4	2	0	1	5	2	+3

Last updated: 19 February 2013.
Source: Group results

==== Knockout phase ====
===== Round of 32 =====
14 February 2013 First leg	Bayer Leverkusen (Germany)	0–1	(Portugal) Benfica	Leverkusen, Germany
		Report	Cardozo 61'	Stadium: BayArena; Attendance: 25,375; Referee: Antonio Mateu Lahoz

21 February 2013 Second leg	Benfica (Portugal)	2–1 (3–1 agg.)	(Germany) Bayer Leverkusen	Lisbon, Portugal
				Stadium: Estádio da Luz

=== Overall record ===
As of 3 May 2013

Competition	First match	Last match	Record							
Competition	First match	Last match	G	W	D	L	GF	GA	GD	Win %
Bundesliga	25 August 2012	18 May 2013	31	16	8	7	59	38	+21	51.61
DFB-Pokal	18 August 2012	19 December 2012	3	2	0	1	8	4	+4	66.67
Europa League	20 September 2012	21 February 2013	8	4	1	3	10	5	+5	50.00
Total			42	22	9	11	77	47	+30	52.38

== Squad information ==
=== Squad and statistics ===
==== Squad, appearances and goals ====
As of 16 April 2013

No.	Pos	Nat	Player	Total		Bundesliga		DFB-Pokal		Europa League	
No.	Pos	Nat	Player	Apps	Goals	Apps	Goals	Apps	Goals	Apps	Goals
Goalkeepers
1	GK	(Germany) GER	Bernd Leno	34	0	27	0	1	0	6	0
22	GK	(United States) USA	David Yelldell	0	0	0	0	0	0	0	0
33	GK	(Germany) GER	Michael Rensing	4	0	2	0	1	0	1	0
36	GK	(Germany) GER	Niklas Lomb	1	0	0	0	0	0	1	0
Defenders
2	DF	(Germany) GER	Daniel Schwaab	18	0	12	0	2	0	4	0
4	DF	(Germany) GER	Philipp Wollscheid	29	3	21	2	1	0	7	1
5	DF	(Germany) GER	Manuel Friedrich	15	2	8	0	2	1	5	1
17	DF	(Poland) POL	Sebastian Boenisch	14	1	12	1	0	0	2	0
20	DF	(Spain) ESP	Dani Carvajal	30	1	27	1	1	0	2	0
21	DF	(Turkey) TUR	Ömer Toprak	27	0	22	0	1	0	4	0
23	DF	(Brazil) BRA	Carlinhos	3	0	0	0	0	0	3	0
24	DF	(Czech Republic) CZE	Michal Kadlec	15	1	11	1	1	0	3	0
Midfielders
3	MF	(Germany) GER	Stefan Reinartz	31	2	24	2	2	0	5	0
6	MF	(Germany) GER	Simon Rolfes	34	4	25	3	2	1	7	0
8	MF	(Germany) GER	Lars Bender	35	3	28	3	2	0	5	0
13	MF	(Germany) GER	Jens Hegeler	29	3	22	1	1	1	6	1
14	MF	(Japan) JPN	Hajime Hosogai	21	0	16	0	1	0	4	0
18	MF	(Germany) GER	Sidney Sam	28	5	22	5	2	0	4	0
27	MF	(Germany) GER	Gonzalo Castro	37	8	29	6	2	0	6	2
30	MF	(Germany) GER	Kolja Pusch	1	0	0	0	0	0	1	0
31	MF	(Germany) GER	Dominik Kohr	6	0	4	0	0	0	2	0
32	MF	(Germany) GER	Jonas Meffert	1	0	0	0	0	0	1	0
38	MF	(Germany) GER	Karim Bellarabi	11	2	8	0	1	1	2	1
	MF	(Germany) GER	Julian Riedel	1	1	0	0	0	0	1	1
Forwards
7	FW	(Chile) CHI	Junior Fernandes	13	0	6	0	1	0	6	0
9	FW	(Germany) GER	André Schürrle	37	12	29	9	2	1	6	2
11	FW	(Germany) GER	Stefan Kießling	42	27	34	25	2	1	6	1
16	FW	(Poland) POL	Arkadiusz Milik	5	0	4	0	0	0	1	0
19	FW	(Germany) GER	Okan Aydın	3	0	1	0	0	0	2	0
37	FW	(Germany) GER	Tobias Steffen	2	0	0	0	0	0	2	0
No longer at the club
19	FW	(Germany) GER	Samed Yeşil	0	0	0	0	0	0	0	0
10	MF	(Brazil) BRA	Renato Augusto	11	0	6	0	0	0	5	0

==== Minutes played, goal scorers and scoring rate ====
No.	Player	Total			Bundesliga			DFB-Pokal			Europa League		
No.	Player	MP	G	SR	MP	G	SR	MP	G	SR	MP	G	SR
40	Julian Riedel	90	1	1.00	0	0	—	0	0	—	90	1	1.00
18	Sidney Sam	694	5	0.65	494	5	0.94	40	0	0.00	160	0	0.00
11	Stefan Kießling	2,802	18	0.58	2,223	16	0.65	136	1	0.66	353	1	0.26
9	André Schürrle	2,775	9	0.29	2,147	6	0.25	278	1	0.32	350	2	0.51
38	Karim Bellarabi	659	2	0.27	411	0	0.00	68	1	1.32	180	1	0.50
13	Jens Hegeler	1,040	3	0.26	477	1	0.19	141	1	0.64	422	1	0.21
27	Gonzalo Castro	2,808	7	0.22	2,188	5	0.21	209	0	0.00	411	2	0.44
5	Manuel Friedrich	942	2	0.19	356	0	0.00	180	1	0.50	406	1	0.22
17	Sebastian Boenisch	963	1	0.09	775	1	0.12	90	0	0.00	98	0	0.00
8	Lars Bender	2,860	3	0.09	2,180	3	0.12	300	0	0.00	380	0	0.00
4	Philipp Wollscheid	2,970	3	0.09	2,160	2	0.08	180	0	0.00	630	1	0.14
24	Michal Kadlec	1,123	1	0.08	843	1	0.11	90	0	0.00	190	0	0.00
3	Stefan Reinartz	2,404	2	0.07	1,861	2	0.10	178	0	0.00	365	0	0.00
6	Simon Rolfes	2,457	3	0.11	1,737	2	0.10	136	1	0.66	584	0	0.00
20	Daniel Carvajal	2,443	1	0.04	2,069	1	0.04	210	0	0.00	164	0	0.00

=== Transfers ===
==== Out ====
15 GK René Adler 27 EU Bayer Leverkusen Transfer Summer 2017 Free [8]

== Kits ==
Home	Home Alternate	Home Alt. 2	Away	Third

Type	Shirt	Shorts	Socks	First appearance / Info
Home	Red	Black	Red	
Home Alt.	Red	Red	Red	UEFA EL, Group stage, October 4 against Trondheim
Home Alt. 2	Red	Black	Black	Bundesliga, Match 34, May 18 against Hamburg
Away	White	White	White	
Third	Navy	Navy	Navy	
