= Philipp Wollscheid =

German footballer (born 1989)

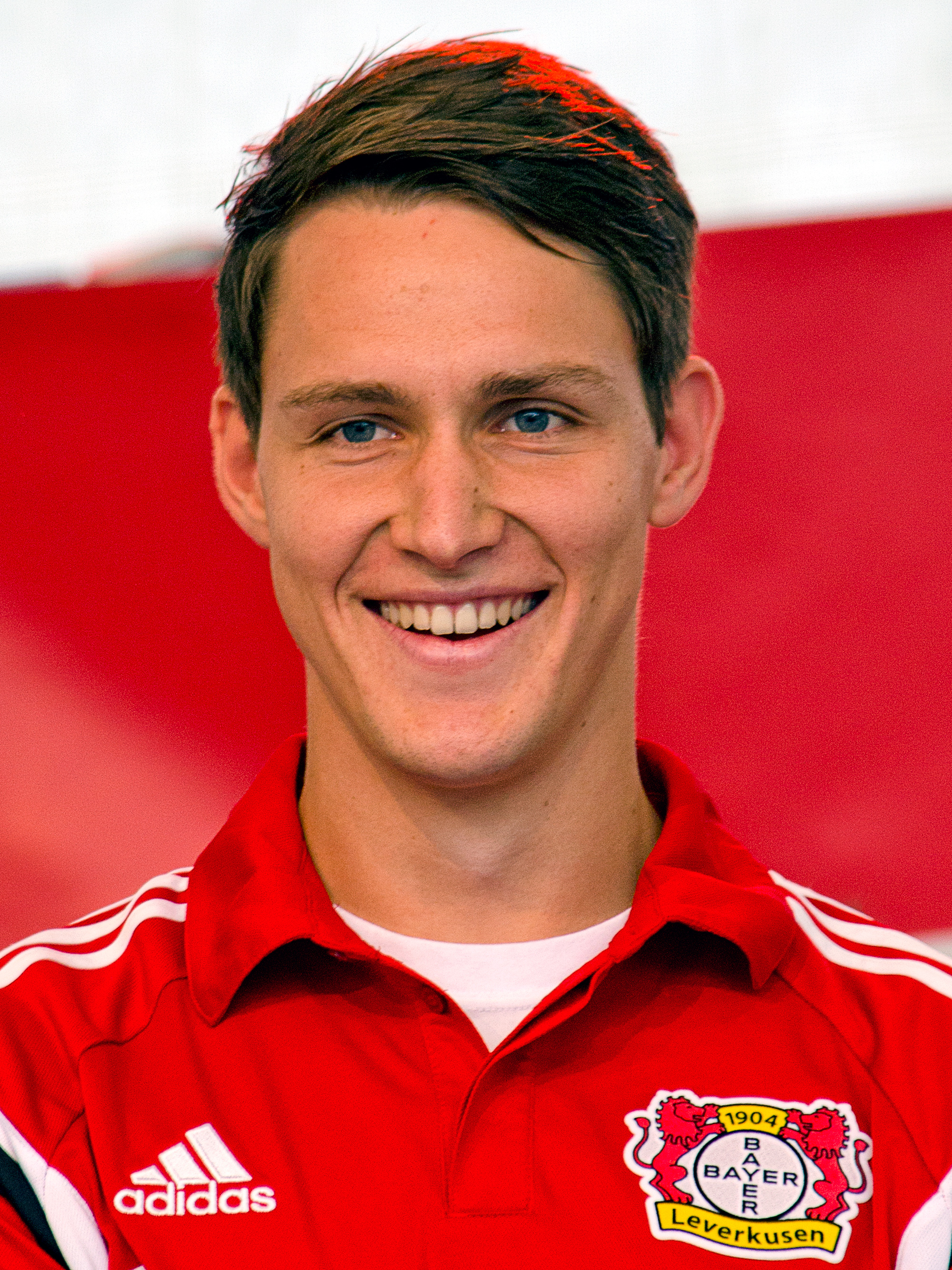
- Wollscheid with Bayer Leverkusen in 2014

Personal information
- Full name: Philipp Johannes Wollscheid
- Date of birth: 6 March 1989 (age 37)
- Place of birth: Wadern, Saarland, West Germany
- Height: 1.94 m (6 ft 4 1/2 in)
- Position: Centre-back

Youth career
- 1994–1998: SV Morscholz
- 1998–2002: SV Wadrill
- 2002–2004: VfL Primstal
- 2004–2006: SV Morscholz
- 2006–2007: SG Noswendel-Wadern

Senior career*
Years	Team	Apps	(Gls)
2007–2008	SV Rot-Weiss Hasborn	18	(0)
2008–2009	1. FC Saarbrücken	30	(3)
2009–2010	1. FC Nürnberg II	40	(1)
2010–2012	1. FC Nürnberg	52	(5)
2012–2015	Bayer Leverkusen	51	(2)
2014–2015	→ 1. FSV Mainz 05 (loan)	5	(0)
2015	→ Stoke City (loan)	12	(0)
2015–2017	Stoke City	33	(0)
2016–2017	→ VfL Wolfsburg (loan)	7	(0)
2017	→ VfL Wolfsburg II (loan)	2	(0)
2017–2018	Metz	0	(0)
2017–2018	Metz B	2	(0)
Total		252	(11)

International career
2010	Germany U20	1	(0)
2013	Germany	2	(0)
- * Club domestic league appearances and goals

Philipp Johannes Wollscheid (born 6 March 1989) is a German former professional footballer who played as a centre-back.

Wollscheid began his career playing amateur football for various clubs in the Saarland. He progressed to semi-professional level with SV Rot-Weiss Hasborn in 2007 and then 1. FC Saarbrücken. He was released by Saarbrücken in the summer of 2009 and then joined 1. FC Nürnberg following a successful trial. After spending time playing for the second team he broke into the Nürnberg first team and became a regular in the Bundesliga. His performances for Nürnberg saw him transfer to Bayer Leverkusen in July 2012.

Wollscheid was a regular under Sami Hyypiä at Leverkusen in 2012–13 and 2013–14. However, he fell out of favor with new manager Roger Schmidt and joined 1. FSV Mainz 05 on loan in August 2014. Wollscheid joined English side Stoke City on loan in January 2015 which was made permanent at the end of the season. After losing his place at Stoke, Wollscheid had an unsuccessful spell on loan at VfL Wolfsburg in 2016–17. His contract with Stoke was terminated by mutual consent in August 2017 and Wollscheid joined French club Metz. He retired in October 2019.

== Club career ==
=== Early career ===
Born in Wadern, Saarland, Wollscheid started his career in the youth teams of various local amateur sides. He made his first team debut in March 2007 for SG Noswendel-Wadern in the Landesliga – then the seventh tier of the German football league system. At the start of the 2007–08 season, he joined SV Rot-Weiss Hasborn in the fifth tier Oberliga, appearing 18 times for the club before moving to 1. FC Saarbrücken six months later. He struggled to make an impact during his 18-month spell at the club, and made many of his 30 league appearances as a substitute. Following Saarbrücken's promotion to the Regionalliga in 2009, Wollscheid decided to look for a new club.

=== 1. FC Nürnberg ===
He arranged a trial with 1. FC Nürnberg, and subsequently signed a three-year deal with the club. Having not trained at a youth academy like many other young footballers, Wollscheid admitted to knowing little about tactics before he joined Nürnberg, and had little idea about how a back four operates. He spent his first season at the club playing for the club's reserve team, making 26 Regionalliga appearances and scoring one goal.

He rose to prominence during the 2010–11 Bundesliga season, making his first team debut in a 3–1 defeat against 1. FC Kaiserslautern in November 2010. He soon became a regular starter for Nürnberg and finished the year ranked third among all Bundesliga defenders, according to kicker's player ratings.

=== Bayer Leverkusen ===
In November 2011, Wollscheid agreed a five-year deal with Bayer Leverkusen beginning from summer 2012. In the 2012–13 season under the management of Sami Hyypiä, Wollscheid played 40 times scoring three goals as Leverkusen finished in third position. He struggled with injury and form in 2013–14, making 27 appearances as Hyypiä was sacked in April 2014. His replacement Roger Schmidt opted for the pairing of Emir Spahić and Ömer Toprak and Wollscheid was free to find another club.

==== Mainz loan ====
In the summer of 2014, Wollscheid joined 1. FSV Mainz 05 on loan for the 2014–15 season. He played five times for Mainz before leaving in January 2015.

=== Stoke City ===
He ended his loan with Mainz in January 2015 and joined English Premier League side Stoke City, on another temporary deal through to the end of the season, with an option to buy him based on his performances. He made his debut for Stoke on 11 January 2015 in a 3–0 defeat away at Arsenal. In his second match against Leicester City, Wollscheid played alongside Marc Muniesa as Stoke secured a 1–0 victory. His performance earned him praise from manager Mark Hughes. However his performances dropped off and he was criticized for poor performances against Blackburn Rovers and Sunderland. He went and played a total of 14 games for Stoke in 2014–15.

On 21 May 2015, Stoke announced that they had taken up their option to buy Wollscheid for an undisclosed fee, reported to be £2.75 million on a three-year contract. Wollscheid was a key member of Mark Hughes's squad in 2015–16, playing 39 times as the Potters finished in ninth position and reached the semi-final of the League Cup.

==== Wolfsburg (loan) ====
On 31 August 2016, Philipp Wollscheid signed for Bundesliga side VfL Wolfsburg from Stoke City on a season-long loan, with a purchase option at the end of the season. His time at Wolfsburg started terribly after playing just two matches he was suspended by the club for a training ground row with head coach Dieter Hecking. After Hecking was sacked Wollschied's return to training was disrupted by a severe case of tinnitus which required ear surgery. He regained his fitness and played some matches for the reserve team in the Regionalliga. He returned to the first team under new head coach Andries Jonker as Wolfsburg beat Eintracht Braunschweig in the relegation play-off to remain in the Bundesliga.

=== Metz ===
Wollscheid joined French club Metz on 30 August 2017, after his Stoke contract was cancelled by mutual consent. He left Metz in January 2018 after failing to make a Ligue 1 appearance.

== Retirement ==
Following his release from Metz, Wollscheid returned to his home town of Wadern, and began playing for his friend's successful five-a side futsal team. In an interview in October 2019 Wollscheid revealed that he no longer enjoyed being a professional footballer.—“Had I been able to play without emotion, I would probably have carried on for another six years". “But I realised that I would only be going to work to earn money and I said to myself that cannot be right.” "The football business in general is simply wrong. One day you will be praised by everyone to the sky, the next you are not good enough anymore. I have never been able to endure these ups and downs.”

== International career ==
He represented the German national under-20 football team on one occasion. On 29 May 2013, he made his international debut for Germany national team in a friendly game against Ecuador in Boca Raton, Florida. His second and last cap came three days later in a 3–4 loss against the United States in Washington, D.C.

== Style of play ==
Wollscheid played as a centre-back and has been compared to compatriot Per Mertesacker.

Like Mertesacker, Wollscheid may be big, but he will not strike the fear of God into opposing strikers. At his best, he is a gifted all round defender, with excellent positioning and relatively secure heading and tackling. He can play with both feet, and can mark equally well man to man or zonally, although he can be prone to losses of concentration.

— German sports writer Kit Holden gives his opinion on Philipp Wollscheid.

== Personal life ==
Wollscheid grew up supporting 1. FC Kaiserslautern and stated that his dream is to end his playing career at the club.

== Career statistics ==
=== Club ===
Appearances and goals by club, season and competition
Club	Season	League			Cup		League Cup		Other		Total	
Club	Season	Division	Apps	Goals	Apps	Goals	Apps	Goals	Apps	Goals	Apps	Goals
SV Rot-Weiss Hasborn	2007–08	Oberliga Südwest	18	0	0	0	—		—		18	0
1. FC Saarbrücken	2008–09	Oberliga Südwest	30	3	0	0	—		—		30	3
1. FC Nürnberg II	2009–10	Regionalliga Süd	26	1	0	0	—		—		26	1
1. FC Nürnberg II	2010–11	Regionalliga Süd	14	0	0	0	—		—		14	0
1. FC Nürnberg II	Total		40	1	0	0	—		—		40	1
1. FC Nürnberg	2010–11	Bundesliga	19	3	2	0	—		—		21	3
1. FC Nürnberg	2011–12	Bundesliga	33	2	3	0	—		—		36	2
1. FC Nürnberg	Total		52	5	5	0	—		—		57	5
Bayer Leverkusen	2012–13	Bundesliga	31	2	2	0	—		7	1	40	3
Bayer Leverkusen	2013–14	Bundesliga	20	0	3	0	—		4	0	27	0
Bayer Leverkusen	2014–15	Bundesliga	0	0	0	0	—		0	0	0	0
Bayer Leverkusen	Total		51	2	5	0	—		11	1	67	3
Mainz 05 (loan)	2014–15	Bundesliga	5	0	0	0	—		—		5	0
Stoke City (loan)	2014–15	Premier League	12	0	2	0	0	0	—		14	0
Stoke City	2015–16	Premier League	31	0	2	0	6	0	—		39	0
Stoke City	2016–17	Premier League	2	0	0	0	0	0	—		2	0
Stoke City	2017–18	Premier League	0	0	0	0	1	0	—		1	0
Stoke City	Total		45	0	4	0	7	0	—		56	0
VfL Wolfsburg (loan)	2016–17	Bundesliga	7	0	0	0	—		2	0	9	0
VfL Wolfsburg II (loan)	2016–17	Regionalliga Nord	2	0	—		—		—		2	0
Metz	2017–18	Ligue 1	0	0	0	0	1	0	—		1	0
Metz B	2017–18	Championnat National 3	2	0	—		—		—		2	0
Career total			252	11	14	0	8	0	13	1	287	12

=== International ===
Appearances and goals by national team and year
National team	Year	Apps	Goals
Germany
Germany	2013	2	0
Total		2	0
