= Simon Rolfes =

German footballer (born 1982)

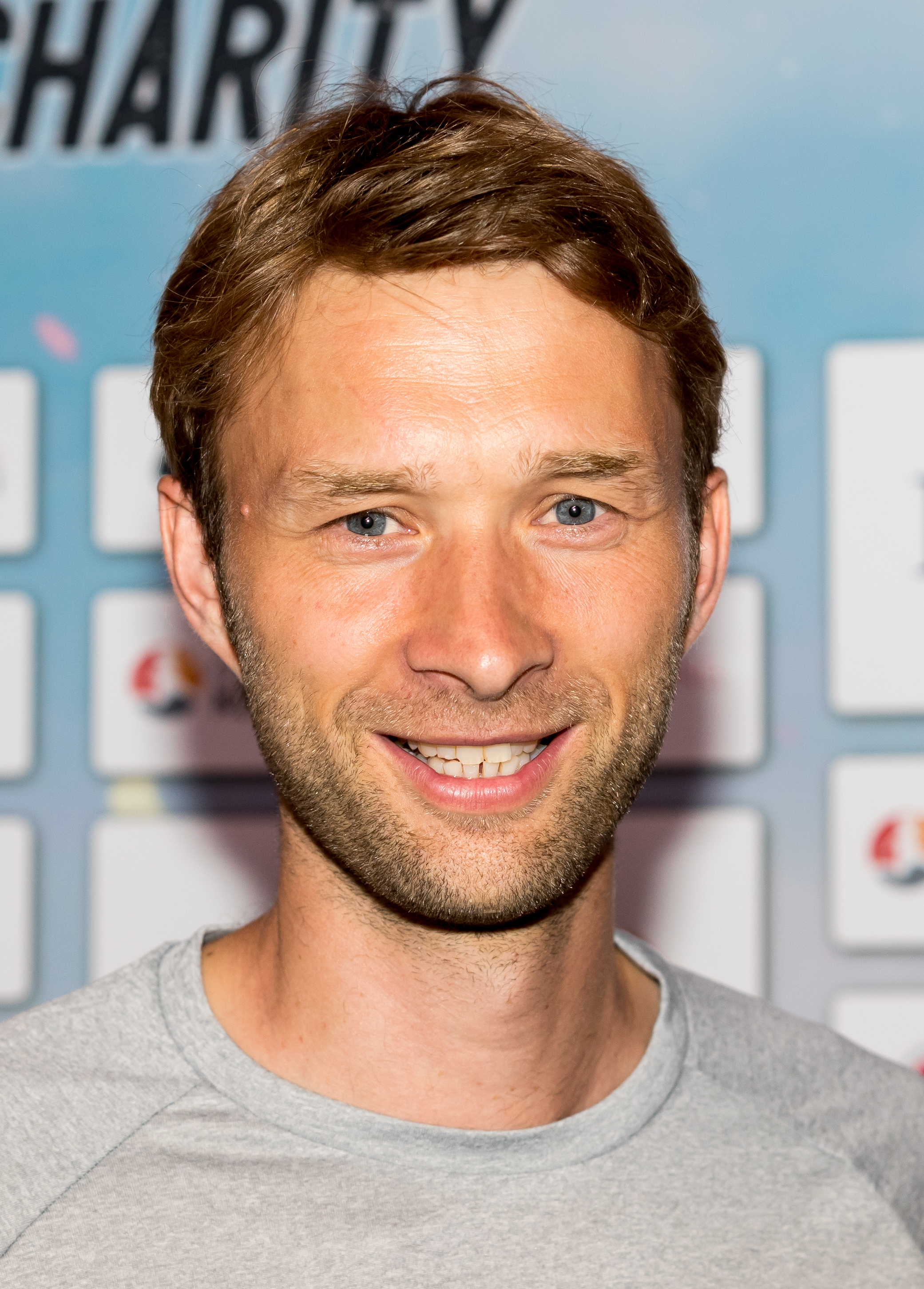
- Rolfes in 2019

Personal information
- Date of birth: 21 January 1982 (age 44)
- Place of birth: Ibbenbüren, West Germany
- Height: 1.91 m (6 ft 3 in)
- Position: Defensive midfielder

Team information
- Current team: Bayer Leverkusen (managing director of sport)

Youth career
- 1986–1999: TuS Recke
- 1999–2000: Werder Bremen

Senior career*
Years	Team	Apps	(Gls)
2000–2004	Werder Bremen II	100	(18)
2002–2004	Werder Bremen	0	(0)
2003	→ SSV Reutlingen (loan)	13	(0)
2004–2005	Alemannia Aachen	28	(3)
2005–2015	Bayer Leverkusen	288	(41)
2010	→ Bayer Leverkusen II	1	(0)
Total		430	(62)

International career
2002	Germany U21	1	(0)
2004–2005	Germany B	3	(0)
2007–2011	Germany	26	(2)

Managerial career
- 2018: Bayer Leverkusen (academy manager)
- 2018–2022: Bayer Leverkusen (sporting director)
- 2022–: Bayer Leverkusen (managing director of sport)
- * Club domestic league appearances and goals

Simon Rolfes (born 21 January 1982) is a German professional football official and a former player who played as a defensive midfielder. He is the managing director of sport for Bayer Leverkusen.

== Club career ==
=== Early career ===
Rolfes started his career at Werder Bremen after progressing through their academy. During the 2000–01 season, he scored five goals in 26 league appearances for the reserve team. He scored against Dresdner SC, Fortuna Düsseldorf, Lüneburger SK, Erzgebirge Aue and Fortuna Köln. He also made an appearances in the DFB-Pokal. He would score seven goals in 31 league appearances and a goal in two DFB-Pokal during the 2001–02 season and two goals in 17 league appearances and an appearance during the DFB-Pokal during the 2002–03 season. He also made a UEFA Cup appearance for the first team during the 2002–03 season. The match was an 8–0 against Metalurh Donetsk on 3 October 2002. He came on in the 68th minute for Krisztián Lisztes. He was then loaned for the remainder of the season with SSV Reutlingen where he made 13 appearances. In his final season with the reserve team, he scored four goals in 26 league appearances. He made exactly 100 league appearances and four DFB-Pokal appearances for the reserve team and managed to notch 19 goals (one in the DFB-Pokal) from his defensive midfield position.

Despite his good form, Werder Bremen manager Thomas Schaaf did not feature him as a regular; in 2004, he moved to Alemannia Aachen and scored three goals in 28 league appearances in his one season there. He also made two appearances in the DFB-Pokal and seven appearances in the UEFA Cup.

=== Bayer Leverkusen ===
The year 2005 came out to be a crucial year for Rolfes, with Bayer Leverkusen signing him and since then he has become a fan favorite, quickly winning a regular spot and not much after, captaincy in the full squad. He appeared in 37 matches in the 2005–06 season, 49 in the 2006–07 season, 47 in the 2007–08 season, and 39 in the 2008–09 season. Rolfes suffered a serious knee injury on 2 July 2009. During the 2009–10 season, Rolfes missed matchdays 10 to 17 and made his final appearance on matchday 19 against 1899 Hoffenheim. He made only 13 appearances in all competitions during the season. He missed out on the 2010 FIFA World Cup in South Africa. He returned to fitness the following season. He appeared in 36 matches in all competitions. He continued to be a regular late into his career. He made 40 appearances in the 2011–12 and 2012–13 seasons, 43 in 2013–14 season, and 33 in the 2014–15 season. On 7 December 2014, he announced his decision to retire from football after the 2014–15 season.

== International career ==
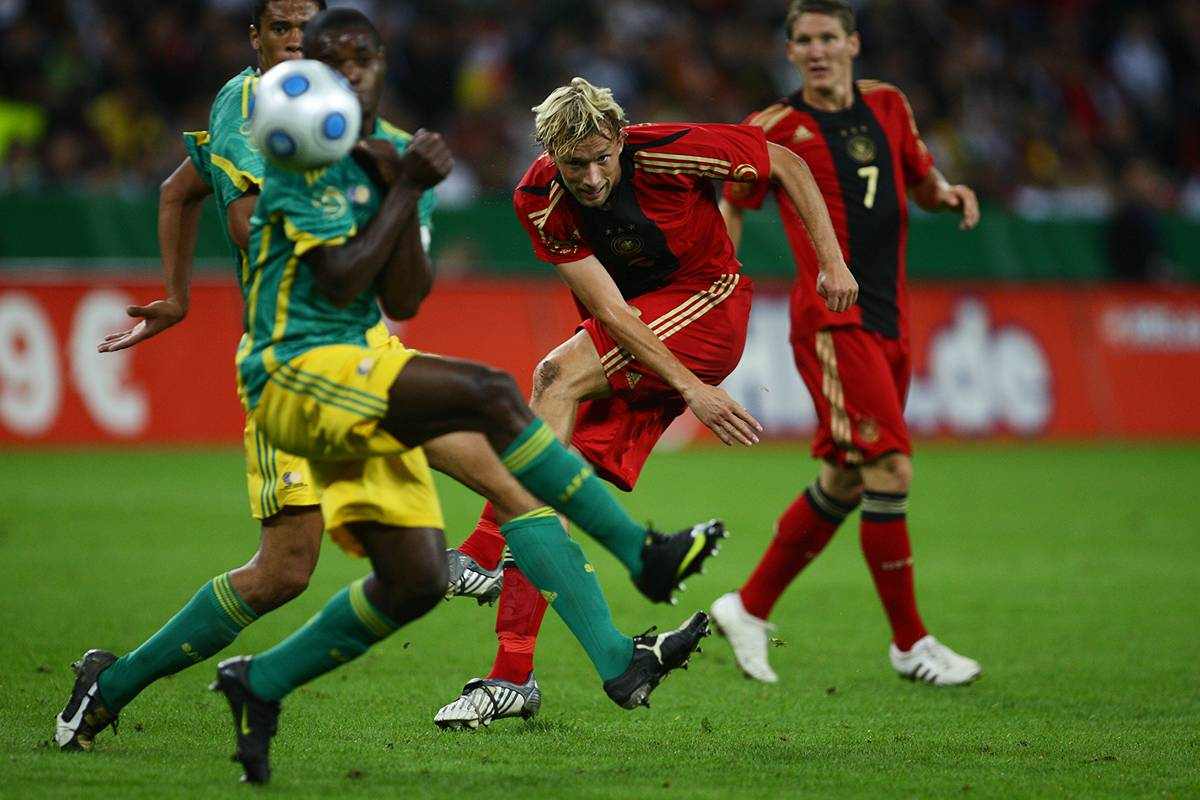
Rolfes and Bastian Schweinsteiger in a match against South Africa

Rolfes made his international debut for Germany in a friendly against Denmark on 28 March 2007 in Duisburg.

He was part of the German team that finished as runners-up at Euro 2008. Rolfes started in the quarter-finals against Portugal in Basel, which Germany won 3–2, and started the semi-finals against Turkey, also in Basel, which they also won 3–2. Rolfes scored his first goal on 6 September 2008 in a 2010 World Cup qualifier, a 6–0 win against Liechtenstein. Rolfes was set to be called up to German squad for the 2010 FIFA World Cup, but he got injured and missed the competition and more than ten first games of the 2010–11 season for the "Werkself".

== Personal life ==
Rolfes married his wife, Jenny on 12 June 2009. They have three daughters.

== Career statistics ==
=== Club ===
Appearances and goals by club, season and competition
Club	Season	League			DFB-Pokal		DFB-Ligapokal		Europe^{1}		Total		Ref.
Club	Season	Division	Apps	Goals	Apps	Goals	Apps	Goals	Apps	Goals	Apps	Goals	Ref.
Werder Bremen II	2000–01	Regionalliga Nord	26	5	1	0	—		—		27	5	
Werder Bremen II	2001–02	Regionalliga Nord	31	7	2	1	—		—		33	8	
Werder Bremen II	2002–03	Regionalliga Nord	17	2	1	0	—		—		18	2	
Werder Bremen II	2003–04	Regionalliga Nord	26	4	—		—		—		26	4	
Werder Bremen II	Total		100	18	4	1	0	0	0	0	104	19	—
Werder Bremen	2002–03	Bundesliga	0	0	0	0	0	0	1	0	1	0	
SSV Reutlingen	2002–03	2. Bundesliga	13	0	0	0	—		—		13	0	
Alemannia Aachen	2004–05	2. Bundesliga	28	3	2	0	—		7	0	37	3	
Bayer Leverkusen	2005–06	Bundesliga	32	7	2	0	1	0	2	0	37	7	
Bayer Leverkusen	2006–07	Bundesliga	34	3	2	1	1	0	12	0	49	4	
Bayer Leverkusen	2007–08	Bundesliga	34	8	1	0	—		12	1	47	8	
Bayer Leverkusen	2008–09	Bundesliga	33	3	6	1	—		—		39	4	
Bayer Leverkusen	2009–10	Bundesliga	11	4	2	0	—		—		13	4	
Bayer Leverkusen	2010–11	Bundesliga	28	5	1	0	—		7	0	36	1	
Bayer Leverkusen	2011–12	Bundesliga	31	3	1	0	—		8	0	40	3	
Bayer Leverkusen	2012–13	Bundesliga	30	3	3	1	—		7	0	40	4	
Bayer Leverkusen	2013–14	Bundesliga	31	4	4	0	—		8	3	43	7	
Bayer Leverkusen	2014–15	Bundesliga	24	1	3	0	—		6	0	33	1	
Bayer Leverkusen	Total		288	41	25	3	2	0	62	4	377	48	—
Bayer Leverkusen II	2010–11	Regionalliga West	1	0	—		—		—		1	0	
Career total			430	62	31	4	2	0	70	4	533	70	—

- 1.Includes UEFA Champions League and UEFA Cup/Europa League.

=== International ===
Appearances and goals by national team and year
National team	Year	Apps	Goals
Germany	2007	7	0
Germany	2008	10	1
Germany	2009	4	0
Germany	2011	5	1
Total		26	2

Scores and results list Germany's goal tally first, score column indicates score after each Rolfes goal.

List of international goals scored by Simon Rolfes
No.	Date	Venue	Opponent	Score	Result	Competition
1	6 September 2008	Rheinpark Stadion, Vaduz, Liechtenstein	Liechtenstein	3–0	6–0	2010 FIFA World Cup qualification
2	11 November 2011	Olimpiyskyi National Sports Complex, Kyiv, Ukraine	Ukraine	2–3	3–3	Friendly

Sporting positions
Preceded by Carsten Ramelow	Bayer Leverkusen captain 2008-–2015	Succeeded by Lars Bender
