= Daniel Schwaab =

German footballer (born 1988)

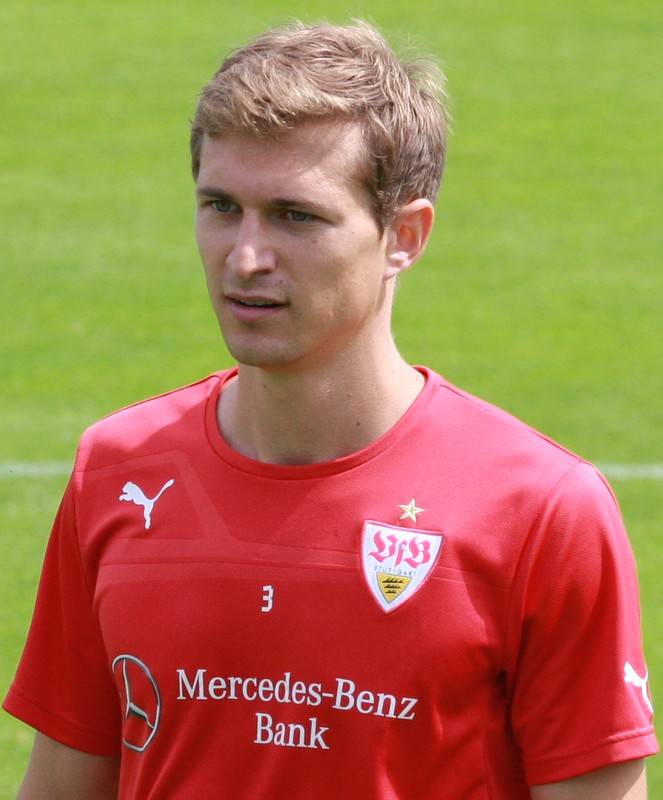
- Schwaab training with VfB Stuttgart

Personal information
- Date of birth: 23 August 1988 (age 38)
- Place of birth: Waldkirch, West Germany
- Height: 1.86 m (6 ft 1 in)
- Position: Centre-back

Team information
- Current team: SC Freiburg (youth coach)

Youth career
- 1992–2000: SV Waldkirch
- 2000–2006: SC Freiburg

Senior career*
| Years | Team | Apps | (Gls) |
| 2006–2009 | SC Freiburg | 91 | (6) |
| 2009–2013 | Bayer Leverkusen | 96 | (0) |
| 2013–2016 | VfB Stuttgart | 92 | (1) |
| 2016–2019 | PSV | 85 | (3) |
| 2019–2020 | PSV | 18 | (1) |
| Total | | 382 | (11) |

International career
| 2006 | Germany U18 | 4 | (0) |
| 2006–2007 | Germany U19 | 7 | (0) |
| 2007–2010 | Germany U21 | 24 | (1) |

Managerial career
- 2022–: SC Freiburg (youth coach)
Medal record
Men's football
Representing Germany
UEFA European Under-21 Championship
| Winner | 2009 Sweden |
- * Club domestic league appearances and goals

Daniel Schwaab (born 23 August 1988) is a German former professional footballer who played for SC Freiburg, Bayer 04 Leverkusen, VfB Stuttgart and PSV Eindhoven, mainly as a centre-back. He represented Germany at U18, U19, and U21 levels, winning the 2009 UEFA European Under-21 Championship.

== Club career ==
=== SC Freiburg ===
Born in Waldkirch, West Germany, Schwaab began his career at hometown club SV Waldkirch from the age of four. He went on trial at SC Freiburg in 2000 and quickly impressed the club's management who signed him. While progressing through the club's youth teams, he initially played as a midfielder before converting to a centre-back. In the summer of 2006, Schwaab signed his first professional contract (Freiburg were in the 2. Bundesliga at the time) and was also promoted to the first team squad.

On 17 September 2006, Schwaab made his Freiburg debut, starting in the right-back position and playing for 79 minutes in a 1–1 draw against 1860 Munich. After making his debut, he established himself in the starting eleven, playing in the right–back position. Schwaab also began playing in different positions, including once in midfield. He helped Freiburg keep clean sheets in three consecutive matches between 4 February and 19 February 2007 and again between 1 April and 15 April 2007. At the end of the 2006-07 season, which saw Freiburg finish in fourth place, missing out on promotion to the Bundesliga, he made thirty–two appearances in all competitions.

At the start of the 2007–08 season, Schwaab continued to play regularly at right–back; at times, he also featured either at centre–back or left–back. Between 7 March and 13 April 2008, Schwaab helped Freiburg keep four clean sheets in six matches. Since the start of the season, he started every match until missing a match against TuS Koblenz on 16 April 2008, due to an undisclosed absence. He returned to the starting line–up against Greuther Fürth on 28 April 2008 and played the whole game, as Freiburg won 3–2. However, he soon suffered an injury and was sidelined for the remainder of the season. He made thirty–three appearances in all competitions.

At the start of the 2008–09 season, Schwaab helped SC Freiburg make a near-perfect start, earning thirteen points in the first five league matches. He then scored his first goal for the club in a 3–1 win over Augsburg on 14 September 2008. This was followed by setting up two goals for Mohammadou Idrissou (who went on to score a hat–trick) in a 5–0 win over Wehen Wiesbaden on 21 September. Three days later on 24 September, he scored his second goal for Freiburg in a 3–1 win over 1899 Hoffenheim in the second round of the DFB-Pokal. He scored twice more that season against FSV Frankfurt and VfL Osnabrück. He was ever-present, starting in every league match, until he was suspended for the fixture against Wehen Wiesbaden on 27 February 2009 after picking up five yellow cards. Schwaab returned to the starting line–up against Alemannia Aachen on 8 March 2009 and helped the club win 2–1. He then scored his fifth goal of the season, as well as setting up a goal for Tommy Bechmann, in a 4–1 win against FSV Frankfurt. Freiburg won 5–2 against TuS Koblenz in the following match to secure promotion to the Bundesliga. In the last game of the season, Schwaab scored his sixth goal of the campaign in a 4–3 win against 1. FC Kaiserslautern. By the end of the 2008–09 season, he made thirty–five appearances and scored six times in all competitions.

=== Bayer Leverkusen ===
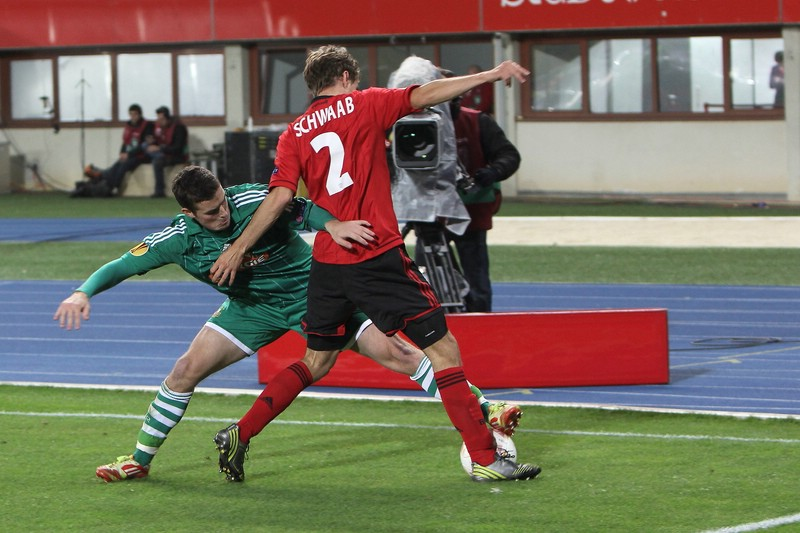
Schwaab playing for Bayer Leverkusen during his last year at the club.

During the 2008–09 season, with his Freiburg contract running out it was announced that Schwaab was to join top flight side Bayer Leverkusen. He had already been linked with a move to the club a year earlier. The outcome saw Leverkusen paying Freiburg €250,000 to sign him before the end of his contract.

Schwaab made his debut (starting the whole game in the right–back position and keeping a clean sheet) in a 1–0 win against SV Babelsberg 03 in the first round of the 2009–10 DFB-Pokal. He made his Bundesliga debut in a 2–2 draw against Mainz 05 in the opening game of the 2009–10 season on 8 August 2009. After appearing in the next three matches, coming from the substitute bench, Schwaab suffered an injury that saw him miss two matches. He returned to the starting line–up against 1. FC Köln on 26 September 2009 and helped Leverkusen keep a clean sheet in a 1–0 win. During a 3–2 loss against Eintracht Frankfurt on 1 April 2010, Schwaab was sent–off in the 49th minute for a foul on Ümit Korkmaz. After the match, the club unsuccessfully appealed his three match suspension. He returned to the starting line–up against Borussia Mönchengladbach and helped Leverkusen draw 1–1, resulting in the club qualifying for the UEFA Europa League next season.

At the start of the 2010–11 season, Schwaab set up two goals in an 11–1 win over Pirmasens in the first round of the DFB-Pokal. He played in both legs of the UEFA Europa League Play–off rounds against Tavriya Simferopol. In a match against Rosenberg in the UEFA Europa League on 16 September 2010, he set up a goal for Patrick Helmes (who went on to score a hat–trick) in a 4–0 win. Schwaab continued to be a first team regular, rotating in playing in the right–back position and centre–back position. Leverkusen went on to finish second in the league after beating his former club Freiburg in the last game of the season.

Ahead of the 2011–12 season, Schwaab was given all-clear after he suffered a muscular problem. On 19 October 2011 he made his UEFA Champions League debut, coming on as a late substitute in a 2–1 win against Valencia. In March 2012 he suffered a shinbone injury that kept him out for the rest of the season.

Ahead of the 2012–13 season, Schwaab continued to rehabilitate from the shinbone injury. He made his first appearance of the season against Carl Zeiss Jena in the first round of DFB Pokal and set up Leverkusen's third goal in a 4–0 win. However, he found himself competing with new signing Dani Carvajal over the right-back position and was demoted to the substitute bench. Schwaab also suffered an ankle injury during a match against Arminia Bielefeld in the second round of the DFB–Pokal on 31 October 2012. He was eventually sidelined for the next three months. He made his return from injury as a centre-back, in a 3–3 draw against Borussia Mönchengladbach on 9 February 2013. Following his return from injury, he was given a handful of first team appearances as a centre-back for the rest of the 2012–13 season, after Ömer Toprak's injury.

=== VfB Stuttgart ===
At the end of his contract with Bayer Leverkusen on 1 July 2013, Schwaab moved to VfB Stuttgart on a free transfer on 8 May 2013, signing a contract until June 2016.

He made his debut for the club in the first leg of the UEFA Europa League third round against Botev Plovdiv and started the whole game, in a 1–1 draw. He made his league debut for Stuttgart in a 3–2 loss against Mainz 05 in the opening game of the 2013–14 season. Schwaab scored an own goal against his former club Bayer Leverkusen that saw Stuttgart lose 1–0. He quickly became a first team regular, rotating between the centre–back and right–back positions.

> Following his return from injury, he regained his first team place, playing in either the centre–back and right–back position. In May 2014 Schwaab suffered an ankle injury that ended his season.

Ahead of the 2014–15 season, Schwaab managed to recover from his injury and featured in Stuttgart's pre–season tour. The club made a poor start, which saw them in the relegation zone. Schwaab scored his first goal for Stuttgart on 27 September 2014 in a 1–0 win over Hannover 96, the team's first win of the season. He missed some matches through injury and suspension during the season but was able to contribute sufficiently to help Stuttgart avoid relegation.

In the 2015–16 season, Schwaab appeared only three times in the first two months as he competed with Florian Klein over the right-back position, and was frequently on the substitutes' bench. By October, Schwaab regained his first team place, playing three times in a defensive midfield position then was used either at centre–back or right–back for the rest of the season. Stuttgart were relegated after losing 3–1 to Wolfsburg on 14 May 2016. Following this, Schwaab was released by the club after they decided against offering him a contract.

=== PSV Eindhoven ===
After leaving Stuttgart, Schwaab moved to reigning Eredivisie champions PSV Eindhoven on a free transfer, signing a three-year contract on 11 July 2016. He was given the #5 shirt ahead of the new season. Schwaab made his PSV debut in a 1–0 win over Feyenoord in the Johan Cruyff Shield. He then made his league debut in the opening game of the season, a 2–1 win over Utrecht. He found himself in and out of the first team, fighting for his place in the centre–back position. At times, he rotated into defensive midfield. Schwaab's performances were praised by manager Phillip Cocu, saying: "I thought Daniel played an excellent game. He stayed calm, played ahead, won his duels and took his responsibility. If you have to play in a place that you are not used to playing there and you fill it in like that, then that class." By December, Schwaab regained his first team place and featured in a number of matches at centre–back. As the season progressed, Schwaab continued to find himself in and out of the starting line–up.

In the opening game of the 2017–18 season, Schwaab set up PSV's second goal in a 3–2 win against AZ Alkmaar. After being dropped to the bench for the next three matches, He returned to the starting line–up against Feyenoord on 17 September 2017 and helped the club keep a clean sheet, in a 1–0 win to maintain their position at the top of the table. Following this, he regained his first team place at centre–back. PSV went on a run of ten consecutive victories between 17 September and 3 December 2017, during which Schwaab scored his first goal for the club, in a 5–2 win against VVV-Venlo. Schwaab started at centre–back on 15 April 2018, as PSV Eindhoven beat rivals Ajax 3–0 to clinch the Eredivise title. After the match, his performance was praised by Piet de Visser, Huub Stevens and Jan Peters. His contributions and influence to the team were praised by teammate Steven Bergwijn and manager Cocu. Schwaab was also named in the league's Team of the Season.

At the start of the 2018–19 season, Schwaab made his first appearance of the season against Feyenoord in the Johan Cruyff Shield as PSV lost 6–5 on penalties. He helped the club got off to a good start to the season, including qualifying for the UEFA Champions League Group Stage after beating Bate Borisov. In a match against rivals Ajax on 31 March 2019, he scored an own goal and gave away a penalty in a 3–1 loss. After the match, Schwaab acknowledged his faults and vowed to help the club maintain their title chase. He made his 100th appearance for PSV against PEC Zwolle on 4 April 2019 as the club won 4–1. However, Schwaab was unable to help PSV defend the league title, surrendering it to Ajax.

During the 2018–19 season, the club held talks with Schwaab over a new contract on three separate occasions. It was announced on 14 May 2019 that he decided not to renew his contract and wanted to return to Germany and live closer to his family. After leaving the club, Schwaab reflected on his time at PSV, saying: "If you want to write a book, you do it that way. That was also the best moment of my career. If you don't get a prize, it's not a good season. We played very well in the first half of the season, with a great idea. The second half of the season was sometimes a bit more difficult, it was no longer automatic. And we had to work hard."

=== PSV Eindhoven (second spell) ===
Following his release by PSV Eindhoven, Schwaab returned to Germany and trained at his former clubs, SV Waldkirch and SC Freiburg, in order to maintain his fitness. But on 11 August 2019, he re-joined PSV on a one-year deal, after a possible agreement between Freiburg and the player did not materialise. Explaining his return, Schwaab said: "I wanted to be closer to my family. My eldest son goes to school in Germany. Now my family is here on vacation. When the vacation is over, everyone goes back. I needed time to recharge, to get a good feeling with my family. That good feeling is back. I can go again and they can solve it at home without me."

His first game after re-signing on a permanent came on 29 August 2019 against Apollon Limassol in the second leg of the UEFA Europa League Play–off round. Schwaab continued as a first-team regular, making 24 appearances and scoring twice in all competitions before the 2019–20 Eredivisie halted on 12 March 2020 due to the pandemic; the season was eventually cancelled. PSV announced on 28 March 2020 that Schwaab was among eight players to not have their contract renewed at the end of the season. On 20 May, the club terminated Schwaab's contract with immediate effect to allow him to return to Germany. After leaving the club, he spoke in an interview with Eindhoven Dagblad, saying: "I cherish this period of four years for the rest of my life. Not only because I won something with the club, but also because beautiful and sincere friendships have been made and I felt respect here. I could and was allowed to be who I am here. The fact that I made the choice to come to Eindhoven in 2016 was the best I could have done. The 2018 championship will be a highlight forever... Two years before that I had been relegated in Germany, but PSV somehow gave me something extra. I was able to do more than before, felt confident and in 2018 I had the very best year of my career. Because of my period at PSV my career has been successful."

== International career ==
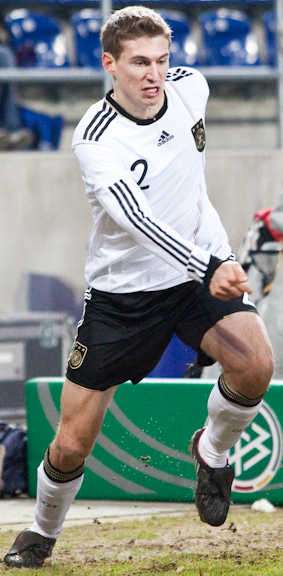
Schwaab playing for the U21.

On 30 January 2006, Schwaab made his Germany U18 debut, starting and playing 76 minutes before being substituted in a 5–1 win over Finland U18. He later made three more appearances for the U18s. On 5 September 2006, Schwaab made his Germany U19 debut in a 1–0 win against Austria U19. He scored his first goal for the U19s in a 7–2 win against Estonia U19 on 30 October 2006. In July 2007, Schwaab was called up to the squad for the UEFA European Under-19 Championship in Austria. He played three times in the tournament, as the team were eliminated in the semi–finals.

Schwaab was called up to the U21 for the first time on 21 August 2007. He made his debut in a 2–2 draw against Republic of Ireland U21. He played in both legs of the UEFA European Under-21 Championship qualification against France U21, as Germany won 2–1 on aggregate. Schwaab was selected for the 2009 UEFA European Under-21 Championship; he was an unused substitute throughout the tournament, before coming on as a substitute during the final against England Y21 on 29 June – Germany won 4–0 to win the tournament. Schwaab thereafter became first choice defender for Germany U21 in the next qualifying campaign. He scored his first U21 goal in an 11–0 win over San Marino U21 on 17 November 2009. Schwaab made two more appearances for Germany U21s, playing in both matches against Iceland in 2010, claiming a total of 24 caps.

== Post–playing career ==
Schwaab announced his retirement from playing in October 2020, and began a work placement at former SC Freiburg. PSV Eindhoven previously offered the player a job as a trainer but he turned it down. In August 2022, Freiburg's website revealed that Schwaab was working as a youth coach at the club.

== Personal life ==
Schwaab grew up supporting SC Freiburg, later revealing he had slept in club-branded bedclothes as a child, eventually playing for them as he reached his adulthood. He said his favorite subject in school were Sports, Maths and Physics. He later graduated in economics at Fernuni Hagen.

In December 2011, Schwaab married his long–term girlfriend, Lisa, a teacher, and together. They have two children.

== Honours ==
PSV Eindhoven

- Eredivisie: 2017–18
- Johan Cruyff Shield: 2016

Germany U21

- UEFA European Under-21 Championship: 2009
