= Patrick Helmes =

German football manager (born 1984)

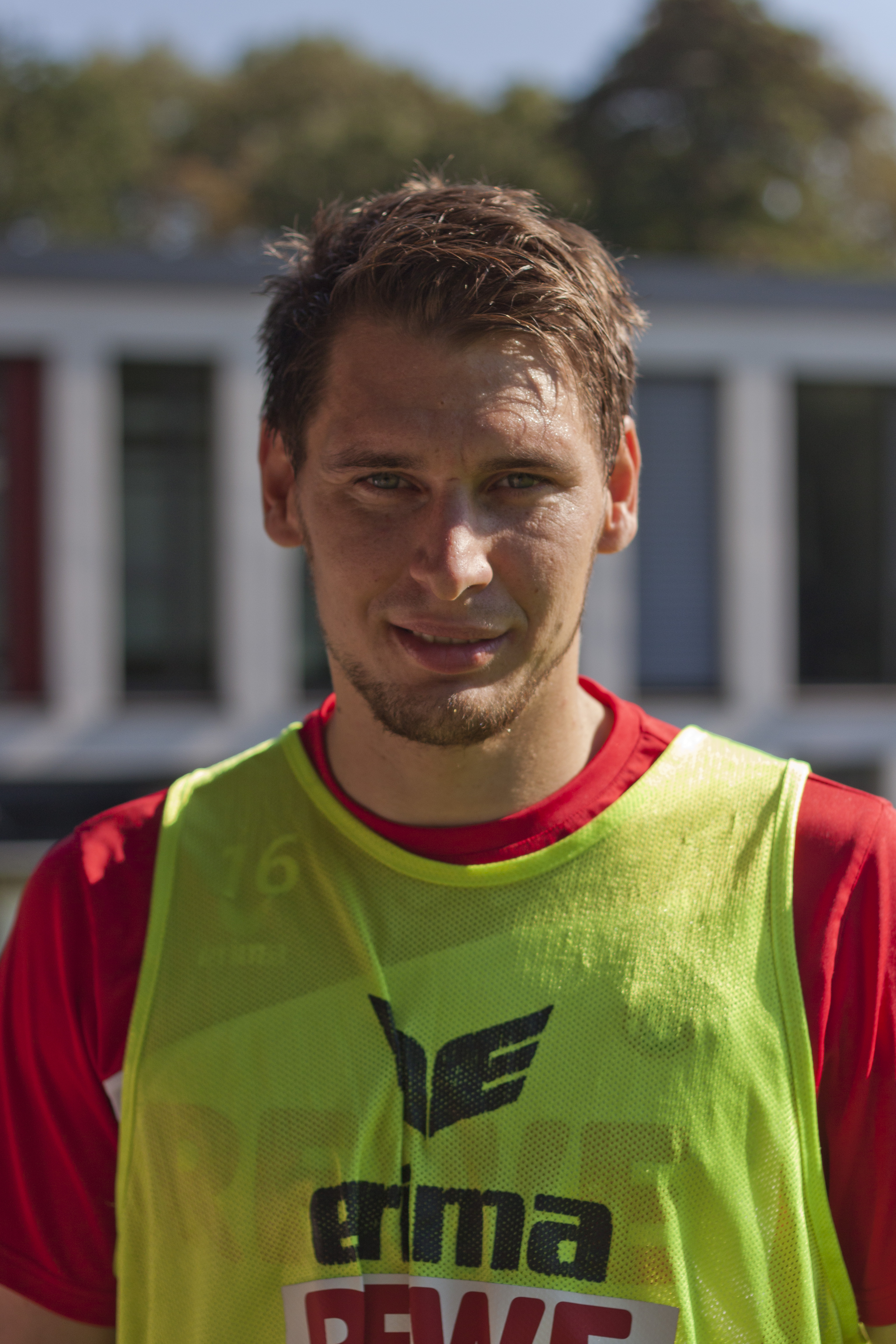
- Helmes with 1. FC Köln in 2013

Personal information
- Date of birth: 1 March 1984 (age 42)
- Place of birth: Cologne, West Germany
- Height: 1.82 m (6 ft 0 in)
- Position: Striker

Youth career
- 1989–1991: TuS Alchen
- 1991–1992: SpVgg Bürbach
- 1992–1997: Sportfreunde Siegen
- 1997–2000: 1. FC Köln
- 2000–2003: Sportfreunde Siegen

Senior career*
Years	Team	Apps	(Gls)
2003–2005	Sportfreunde Siegen	51	(22)
2005–2008	1. FC Köln	65	(35)
2005–2006	1. FC Köln II	7	(4)
2008–2011	Bayer Leverkusen	57	(28)
2011–2013	VfL Wolfsburg	28	(13)
2011–2013	VfL Wolfsburg II	10	(11)
2013–2015	1. FC Köln	27	(12)
Total		245	(125)

International career
2004	Germany Team 2006	1	(0)
2005–2006	Germany U21	9	(3)
2007–2010	Germany	13	(2)

Managerial career
- 2015–2016: 1. FC Köln II (assistant)
- 2016–2017: 1. FC Köln II
- 2017–2018: Rot-Weiß Erfurt (assistant)
- 2020: Admira Wacker Mödling (assistant)
- 2020–2021: Admira Wacker Mödling II
- 2020: Admira Wacker Mödling (caretaker)
- 2021: Alemannia Aachen
- 2023: Sportfreunde Siegen
- * Club domestic league appearances and goals

Patrick Helmes (born 1 March 1984) is a German professional football manager and former player who most recently managed Oberliga Westfalen club Sportfreunde Siegen.

== Club career ==
=== Early career ===
As a youth player, Helmes was active in local clubs in Freudenberg, Westphalia and Siegen. He joined 1. FC Köln in 1997, at the age of 13. However, he was regarded as too unstable and sent away in 2000. He subsequently went back to Sportfreunde Siegen, where he had already spent some time as a youth player. In the 2004–05 season, he scored 21 goals for his team in the third division, which made him top scorer of the league, helping his team to promotion to the second division.

=== 1. FC Köln ===
He then joined his old club Köln again, where he made his Bundesliga debut in 2005 and scored his first goal in his second match, against rivals Bayer Leverkusen. After his club was relegated to the second division, Helmes became one of the most important players for his side, scoring seven times in his first five games of the season and keeping Köln at the top of the table. However, he scored the last of those goals with a broken foot. The injury kept him out of the squad for the following four months, during which his team performed extremely poorly and lost all chances to return to the first division.

Helmes did not hide his intention of joining another team. Even though he confirmed that his departure to Bayer Leverkusen would follow the 2007–08 season, Köln coach Christoph Daum still named him captain of the squad in the summer of 2007. He was later replaced as captain, but nevertheless had a good second half of the season, for which kicker sportsmagazine named him best striker of Germany's second division, ahead of Oliver Neuville, Chinedu Obasi and Demba Ba.

=== Bayer Leverkusen ===
At Leverkusen, Helmes had a good start in the 2008–09 season, despite his injury in June which caused him being out of action for three weeks. Forming a duo with Stefan Kießling, he scored six goals in the first five games of the season, among them a hat-trick against Hannover 96. Only months after signing until 2012, his contract was extended and was then valid until 2013. At the end of his first season at Leverkusen, Helmes had scored 21 goals in 34 league games, and three goals in six appearances in the DFB-Pokal where his team reached the final losing to Werder Bremen. Just about two weeks after the final, a cruciate ligament in Helmes' right knee tore while Helmes was playing football with friends, and he had to be operated. On 19 December 2010, he scored the second goal of the match to achieve a full-time draw against SC Freiburg.

=== VfL Wolfsburg ===
On 31 January 2011, Helmes moved to fellow Bundesliga side VfL Wolfsburg, the champion of 2008–09 for a reported fee of €8 million. He only made eight appearances for the club in his first half-season, facing competition by the club's top strikers Grafite and Mario Mandžukić.

The next season started out better for Helmes, who scored twice in the first game against former team Köln. However, those were his last goals of the first half of the season in which he made his final appearance on 1 October. Helmes even got banned from the Bundesliga squad by manager Felix Magath and had to train with the reserves. He made his comeback appearance in the Bundesliga on 25 February 2012, instantly scoring against Hoffenheim. By the end of the season, he had scored nine more times.

In August 2012, Helmes tore his cruciate ligament in a friendly against Manchester City. His first appearance in the 2012–13 Bundesliga season was on 15 February 2013, against Bayern Munich.

== International career ==
Helmes was selected for the national team for the first time by Joachim Löw. He made his international debut for Germany in a friendly against Denmark on 28 March 2007, being substituted for Jan Schlaudraff in 80th minute. He made two more short appearances afterwards, before he was selected for the starting squad for the first time on 12 September 2007 in a friendly against Romania held at RheinEnergieStadion in Cologne, in which he was joined by fellow Cologne local hero Lukas Podolski. He was included in Löw's 26-man provisional Euro 2008 squad but was eventually left out in favour of Oliver Neuville.

After the European Championships, he had a few more appearances as a substitute. Helmes scored his first goal for the national team on 19 November 2008 in a 2–1 friendly defeat against England. He scored his second goal for Germany almost two years later in a friendly against Denmark after coming on as a substitute.

== Coaching career ==
After retiring in the summer 2015, Helmes became the new assistant manager of 1. FC Köln II. He became the interim head coach on 6 December 2016 and became the permanent head coach on 22 December 2016. His first match was 2–1 loss to Borussia Mönchengladbach II on 10 December 2016. 1. FC Köln took the interim tag off and was manager of 1. FC Köln II until 25 September 2017. His final match was a 6–0 loss to SV Rödinghausen. He then became assistant manager for Rot-Weiß Erfurt. On 13 July 2020, Helmes was hired for a dual role of assistant manager for Admira Wacker Mödling and manager of the reserve team. He was also the interim manager of Admira Wacker's first team between 14 September 2020 and 21 September 2020. He lost his only match as interim manager 5–0 to SKN St. Pölten.

In April 2021 it was announced that he would become the new manager of Alemannia Aachen on 1 July 2021. He was sacked on 26 October 2021 following a poor start to the season.

In January 2023, he returned to management when he signed a contract to become manager of Sportfreunde Siegen. He was dismissed in September 2023 after a series of disappointing results left Siegen in the bottom half of the league table, with only four points from seven games.

== Personal life ==
Helmes' father is Uwe Helmes, a former professional football player who later managed Siegen, among others. As of 2008, he works as a scout for Leverkusen.

== Career statistics ==
=== Club ===
Appearances and goals by club, season and competition
Club	Season	League			Cup		Continental		Total	
Club	Season	Division	Apps	Goals	Apps	Goals	Apps	Goals	Apps	Goals
Sportfreunde Siegen	2003–04	Regionalliga Süd	17	1	1	0	—		18	1
Sportfreunde Siegen	2004–05	Regionalliga Süd	34	21	—		—		34	21
Sportfreunde Siegen	Total		51	22	1	0	—		52	22
1. FC Köln	2005–06	Bundesliga	13	4	0	0	—		13	4
1. FC Köln	2006–07	2. Bundesliga	19	14	1	0	—		20	14
1. FC Köln	2007–08	2. Bundesliga	33	17	1	0	—		34	17
1. FC Köln	Total		65	35	2	0	—		67	35
1. FC Köln II	2005–06	Regionalliga Nord	7	4	1	0	—		8	4
Bayer Leverkusen	2008–09	Bundesliga	34	21	6	3	—		40	24
Bayer Leverkusen	2009–10	Bundesliga	12	2	0	0	—		12	2
Bayer Leverkusen	2010–11	Bundesliga	11	5	2	3	6 (Note: Appearances in the 2010–11 UEFA Europa League.)	4	19	12
Bayer Leverkusen	Total		57	28	8	6	6	4	71	38
VfL Wolfsburg	2010–11	Bundesliga	8	1	0	0	—		8	1
VfL Wolfsburg	2011–12	Bundesliga	16	12	1	0	—		17	12
VfL Wolfsburg	2012–13	Bundesliga	4	0	1	0	—		5	0
VfL Wolfsburg	Total		28	13	2	0	—		30	13
VfL Wolfsburg II	2011–12	Regionalliga Nord	1	1	—		—		1	1
VfL Wolfsburg II	2012–13	Regionalliga Nord	4	7	—		—		4	7
VfL Wolfsburg II	2013–14	Regionalliga Nord	4	3	—		—		4	3
VfL Wolfsburg II	Total		9	11	—		—		9	11
1. FC Köln	2013–14	2. Bundesliga	27	12	1	0	—		28	12
Career total			244	125	15	6	6	4	265	135

=== International ===
Scores and results list Germany's goal tally first, score column indicates score after each Helmes goal.

List of international goals scored by Patrick Helmes
No.	Date	Venue	Opponent	Score	Result	Competition
1	19 November 2008	Olympiastadion, Berlin, Germany	England	1–1	1–2	Friendly
2	11 August 2010	Parken Stadium, Copenhagen, Denmark	Denmark	2–0	2–2	Friendly

== Managerial record ==
As of match played 24 September 2023

Team	From	To	Record								Ref.
Team	From	To	M	W	D	L	GF	GA	GD	Win %	Ref.
1. FC Köln II	6 December 2016	25 September 2017	25	10	4	11	38	46	−8	40.00	
Admira Wacker Mödling II	13 July 2020	11 March 2021	7	3	2	2	10	9	+1	42.86	
Admira Wacker Mödling	14 September 2020	21 September 2020	1	0	0	1	0	5	−5	0.00	
Alemannia Aachen	1 July 2021	26 October 2021	13	2	4	7	12	20	−8	15.38	
Sportfreunde Siegen	4 January 2023	25 September 2023	24	5	8	11	39	43	−4	20.83	
Total			70	20	18	32	99	123	−24	28.57	—

== Honours ==
Bayer Leverkusen

- DFB-Pokal runner-up: 2008–09
