= Michal Kadlec =

Czech footballer (born 1984)

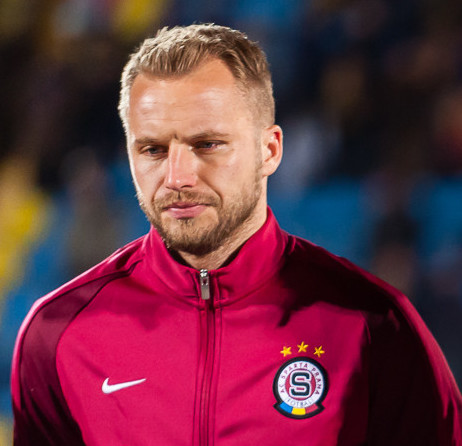
- Kadlec playing for Sparta Prague in 2017

Personal information
- Date of birth: 13 December 1984 (age 41)
- Place of birth: Vyškov, Czechoslovakia
- Height: 1.85 m (6 ft 1 in)
- Positions: Left back; centre back

Youth career
- 1991–1993: SV Alsenborn
- 1993–1998: 1. FC Kaiserslautern
- 1998–2001: Slovácko

Senior career*
Years	Team	Apps	(Gls)
2001–2005	Slovácko	34	(1)
2005–2008	Sparta Prague	94	(7)
2008–2013	Bayer Leverkusen	128	(8)
2013–2016	Fenerbahçe	31	(3)
2016–2018	Sparta Prague	36	(3)
2018–2024	Slovácko	155	(2)

International career
2002	Czech Republic U18	7	(0)
2002–2003	Czech Republic U19	10	(0)
2004–2007	Czech Republic U21	26	(1)
2007–2016	Czech Republic	67	(8)
- * Club domestic league appearances and goals as of 2 June 2024

Michal Kadlec (born 13 December 1984) is a Czech former professional footballer who played as a defender for 1. FC Slovácko, Sparta Prague, Bayer Leverkusen and Fenerbahçe.

Having made his senior national team debut in 2007, Kadlec has scored eight goals in 67 caps for the Czech Republic, representing the country at three UEFA European Championships between 2008 and 2016.

== Early life ==
Kadlec was born in 1984 in Vyškov. After his father, Miroslav Kadlec, joined 1. FC Kaiserslautern in 1990, the family moved to Germany in the Kaiserslautern area. Kadlec learned German in kindergarten before he went to school one year later. After his time in Grundschule, he went to the Gymnasium. When Kadlec's father signed for FK Drnovice in 1998, his son returned to the Czech Republic.

== Club career ==
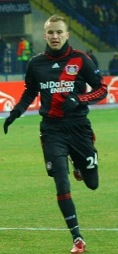
Kadlec playing for Bayer Leverkusen in 2011

Kadlec started his professional career in Slovácko and made his league debut against Baník Ostrava. He joined Sparta Prague in January 2005 and left the club in August 2008, when he signed for Bayer Leverkusen.

On 14 June 2013, he joined Fenerbahçe for a €4.5 million transfer fee, signing a three-year contract worth €2.1 million per season.

On 12 May 2024, Kadlec announced end of his football career.

== International career ==
On 17 November 2007, Kadlec was called up to the Czech national team in a UEFA Euro 2008 qualifying against Slovakia, and debuted in a 3–1 victory where he scored an own goal. Kadlec scored his first goal in the same 3–1 victory, this time against Scotland on 30 May 2008.

On 16 June 2012, against Poland in the European Championship, Kadlec headed a ball off the line in the dying seconds, preserving the Czechs' spot in the quarter-finals of the tournament. The striker had beaten goalkeeper Petr Čech and appeared to be headed to the inside of the far post; if it had been scored, Poland would ensure a draw, and the Czech Republic would be eliminated from the tournament.

== Sponsorship ==
On 11 July 2013, EA Sports announced that Kadlec was featured on the Czech cover of FIFA 14, alongside global cover star Lionel Messi.

== Career statistics ==
=== Club ===
As of 30 July 2021

Club	Season	League			Cup		Continental		Other		Total	
Club	Season	Division	Apps	Goals	Apps	Goals	Apps	Goals	Apps	Goals	Apps	Goals
Slovácko	2001–02	Fortuna liga	1	0	0	0	—		—		1	0
Slovácko	2002–03	Fortuna liga	3	0	0	0	—		—		3	0
Slovácko	2003–04	Fortuna liga	15	1	0	0	1	0	—		16	1
Slovácko	2004–05	Fortuna liga	15	0	0	0	—		—		15	0
Slovácko	Total		34	1	0	0	1	0	—		35	1
Sparta Prague	2004–05	Fortuna liga	10	1	0	0	—		—		10	1
Sparta Prague	2005–06	Fortuna liga	29	0	0	0	6	0	—		35	0
Sparta Prague	2006–07	Fortuna liga	22	0	0	0	6	0	—		28	0
Sparta Prague	2007–08	Fortuna liga	29	3	1	0	8	0	—		38	3
Sparta Prague	2008–09	Fortuna liga	4	3	—		4	0	—		8	3
Sparta Prague	Total		94	7	1	0	24	0	—		119	7
Bayer Leverkusen	2008–09	Bundesliga	30	3	5	2	—		—		35	5
Bayer Leverkusen	2009–10	Bundesliga	23	1	1	0	—		—		24	1
Bayer Leverkusen	2010–11	Bundesliga	32	2	2	0	9	3	—		43	5
Bayer Leverkusen	2011–12	Bundesliga	29	1	1	0	8	1	—		38	2
Bayer Leverkusen	2012–13	Bundesliga	14	1	1	0	3	0	—		18	1
Bayer Leverkusen	Total		128	8	10	2	20	4	—		158	14
Fenerbahçe	2013–14	Süper Lig	9	2	1	0	3	0	1	0	14	2
Fenerbahçe	2014–15	Süper Lig	12	1	10	1	—		1	0	23	2
Fenerbahçe	2015–16	Süper Lig	10	0	11	0	5	0	—		26	0
Fenerbahçe	Total		31	3	22	1	8	0	2	0	63	4
Sparta Prague	2016–17	Fortuna liga	28	3	1	0	12	0	—		41	3
Sparta Prague	2017–18	Fortuna liga	8	0	1	0	1	0	—		10	0
Sparta Prague	Total		36	3	2	0	13	0	—		51	3
Slovácko	2018–19	Fortuna liga	14	0	0	0	—		—		14	0
Slovácko	2019–20	Fortuna liga	27	0	2	0	—		—		29	0
Slovácko	2020–21	Fortuna liga	32	1	1	1	—		—		33	1
Slovácko	2021–22	Fortuna liga	0	0	0	0	2	0	—		2	0
Slovácko	Total		73	1	3	1	2	0	—		78	1
Career total			396	23	38	4	68	4	2	0	504	30

=== International goals ===
#	Date	Venue	Opponent	Score	Result	Competition
1.	30 May 2008	Prague, Czech Republic	Scotland	3–1	Win	Friendly
2.	29 March 2011	České Budějovice, Czech Republic	Liechtenstein	2–0	Win	UEFA Euro 2012 qualifying Group I
3.	3 September 2011	Glasgow, Scotland	Scotland	2–2	Draw	UEFA Euro 2012 qualifying Group I
4.	6 September 2011	Prague, Czech Republic	Ukraine	4–0	Win	Friendly
5.	6 September 2011	Prague, Czech Republic	Ukraine	4–0	Win	Friendly
6.	11 October 2011	Kaunas, Lithuania	Lithuania	1–4	Win	UEFA Euro 2012 qualifying Group I
7.	11 October 2011	Kaunas, Lithuania	Lithuania	1–4	Win	UEFA Euro 2012 qualifying Group I
8.	1 June 2012	Prague, Czech Republic	Hungary	1–2	Loss	Friendly

== Honours ==
=== Club ===
Sparta Prague

- Czech First League: 2004–05, 2006–07
- Czech Cup: 2005–06, 2006–07

Fenerbahçe

- Süper Lig: 2013–14
- Turkish Super Cup: 2014

Slovácko

- Czech Cup: 2021–22

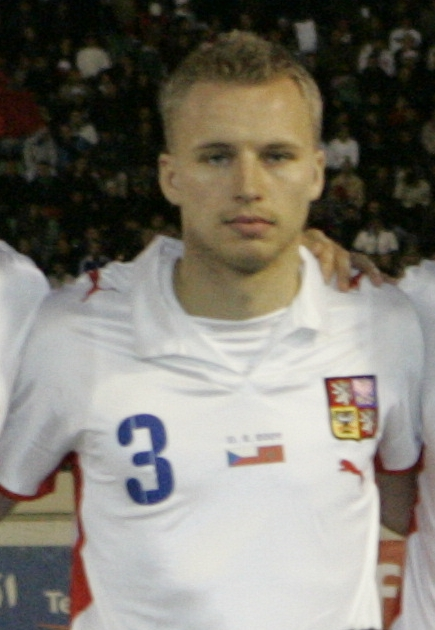
Kadlec lining up for the Czech national team
