= Manuel Friedrich =

German former professional footballer (born 1979)

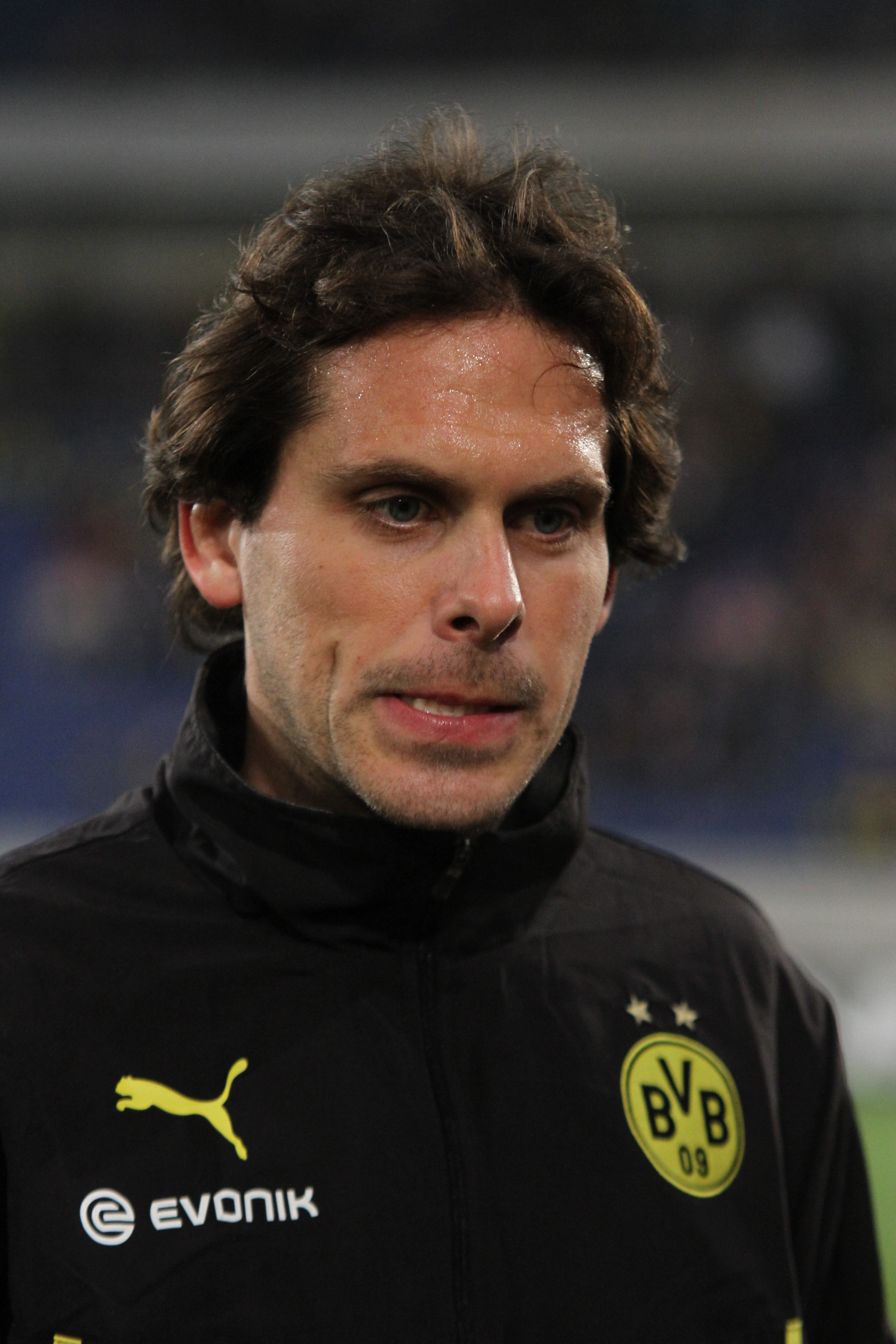
- Friedrich with Borussia Dortmund in 2014

Personal information
- Date of birth: 13 September 1979 (age 47)
- Place of birth: Bad Kreuznach, West Germany
- Height: 1.89 m (6 ft 2 in)
- Position: Centre back

Youth career
- 1992–1995: SG Guldental 07
- 1995–1998: Mainz 05

Senior career*
Years	Team	Apps	(Gls)
1998–2000	Mainz 05 II	55	(11)
2000–2002	Mainz 05	63	(8)
2002–2004	Werder Bremen II	13	(2)
2003	Werder Bremen	1	(0)
2004–2007	Mainz 05	116	(8)
2007–2013	Bayer Leverkusen	147	(11)
2013–2014	Borussia Dortmund	11	(1)
2014	Mumbai City	14	(1)
Total		420	(42)

International career
2006–2008	Germany	9	(1)
- * Club domestic league appearances and goals

Manuel Friedrich (born 13 September 1979) is a German former professional footballer who played as a central defender.

A Mainz 05 youth product, he amassed Bundesliga totals of 258 games and 16 goals over the course of 12 seasons, representing in the competition Werder Bremen, Mainz 05, Bayer Leverkusen and Borussia Dortmund. He spent a season with Mumbai City before retiring.

== Club career ==
=== Mainz and Werder Bremen ===
Born in Bad Kreuznach, Friedrich started playing football at SG Guldental 07, making his professional debuts with 1. FSV Mainz 05 which he had joined in 1995 – the club was then in the 2. Bundesliga. However, he had to wait until 26 February 2000 to make his competition debut, in a home match against Energie Cottbus.

In the following two seasons, Friedrich was a defensive stalwart, scoring an astonishing eight goals – no penalties – in the latter as Mainz finished fourth, just one point shy of promotion.

Those stellar performances attracted attention from the Bundesliga, and Friedrich signed with SV Werder Bremen, but his time there would be anything but successful as he only appeared once in the league in one and a half years combined, the final seven minutes of the 4–1 home triumph against Schalke 04 on 23 August 2003. In that second season in the Hanseatic city he also featured for the reserve squad, in Regionalliga Nord; 2002–03 had already been totally lost to an anterior cruciate ligament injury.

In late January 2004, Friedrich returned to Mainz, still contributing with 17 matches en route to top level promotion. On 23 May he scored one of four goals in the league, netting the second in the decisive 3–0 home win against Eintracht Trier on the final day of the campaign (promotion attained on goal difference). In the following three seasons combined he rarely missed a game, adding four goals, but Mainz would be relegated in 2007.

=== Bayer Leverkusen ===
In July 2007, Friedrich moved to Bayer 04 Leverkusen, continuing to be an everpresent defensive unit and contributing – early in his first year – to consecutive home wins against Karlsruher SC (3–0) and VfL Bochum (2–0). He scored ten league goals in his first three seasons combined.

Friedrich could only appear in 19 games in 2010–11 due to injury, with Leverkusen finishing in second position and qualifying to the UEFA Champions League. In that competition, on 23 November 2011, he headed home in the last-minute to help the hosts come from behind against Chelsea to win it 2–1.

=== Borussia Dortmund ===
After an unsuccessful trial with Bangkok Glass F.C. in Thailand, Friedrich joined Borussia Dortmund on a free transfer on 20 November 2013, following injuries to fellow stoppers Mats Hummels and Neven Subotić. He made his debut for his new team three days later, playing the full 90 minutes in a 3–0 home loss to FC Bayern Munich.

Friedrich scored his first goal for BVB on 8 February 2014, netting his team's third in a 5–1 away demolition of former club Werder Bremen. It was his 16th goal in the German top division.

=== Mumbai City ===
On 22 August 2014, Friedrich signed with Mumbai City FC in the Indian Super League. Peter Reid picked him for the inaugural season of Mumbai City, where he made his debut against Atlético de Kolkata and played 14 matches for the side, scoring one goal.

== International career ==
In March 2006, Friedrich was called up to Germany's squad for a friendly against the United States, thus becoming the first Mainz player to ever represent the national side. However, he did not receive any playing time in the match, and was not part of the 23-man squad at the 2006 FIFA World Cup either.

Friedrich made his full debut on 16 August 2006, playing the entire second half of another friendly, the 3–0 with Sweden in Gelsenkirchen. He subsequently featured the full 90 minutes in the German team's opening two Euro 2008 qualifiers against the Republic of Ireland and San Marino, scoring his first international goal in the latter, the 12th in a 13–0 victory over the group underdogs.

== Career statistics ==
Scores and results list Germany's goal tally first, score column indicates score after each Friedrich goal.

List of international goals scored by Manuel Friedrich
No.	Date	Venue	Opponent	Score	Result	Competition
1	6 September 2006	Stadio Olimpico, Serravalle, San Marino	San Marino	12–0	13–0	Euro 2008 qualifying

== Honours ==
Bayer Leverkusen

- DFB-Pokal: runner-up 2008–09

Borussia Dortmund

- DFB-Pokal: runner-up 2013–14
