= Luca Plogmann =

German footballer (born 2000)

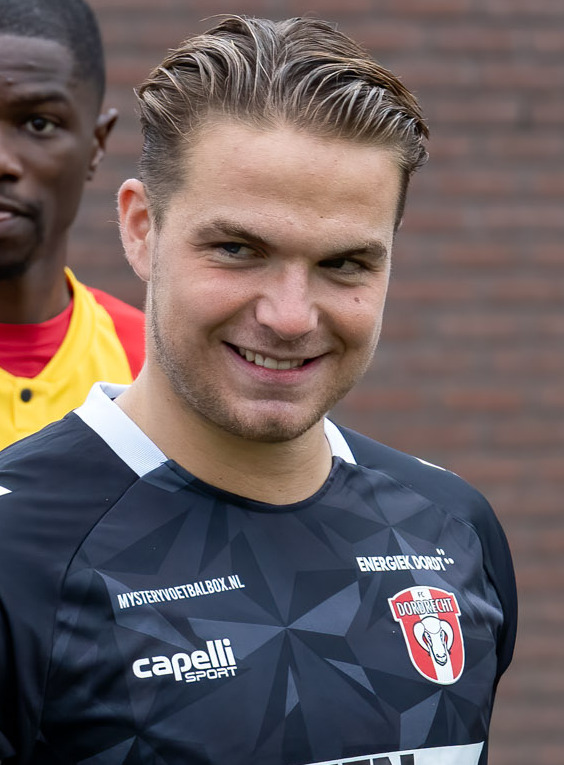
- Plogman with Dordrecht in 2023

Personal information
- Full name: Luca Bastian Plogmann
- Date of birth: 10 March 2000 (age 26)
- Place of birth: Bremen, Germany
- Height: 1.89 m (6 ft 2 in)
- Position: Goalkeeper

Team information
- Current team: Cambuur
- Number: 22

Youth career
- –2007: ATSV Habenhausen
- 2007–2018: Werder Bremen

Senior career*
Years	Team	Apps	(Gls)
2018–2022	Werder Bremen II	46	(0)
2018–2022	Werder Bremen	1	(0)
2020–2021	→ SV Meppen (loan)	8	(0)
2022–2026	Go Ahead Eagles	18	(0)
2023–2024	→ Dordrecht (loan)	35	(0)
2026–	Cambuur	0	(0)

International career
2015	Germany U15	1	(0)
2015–2016	Germany U16	2	(0)
2016–2017	Germany U17	13	(0)
2018	Germany U18	2	(0)
2018–2019	Germany U19	4	(0)
- * Club domestic league appearances and goals as of 11 October 2026

Luca Bastian Plogmann (born 10 March 2000) is a German professional footballer who plays as a goalkeeper for Dutch Eredivisie club Cambuur.

== Career ==
Aged 18, Plogmann received his first call-up to Werder Bremen's first team squad for a match against Wormatia Worms on 18 August 2018 in the first round of the DFB-Pokal with three of the side's other goalkeepers, Stefanos Kapino, Michael Zetterer and Jaroslav Drobný, injured. He made his professional debut on 1 September in a Bundesliga match against Eintracht Frankfurt. He was brought onto the field after first-choice goalkeeper Jiří Pavlenka injured himself while conceding a penalty.

In August 2020, Plogmann extended his contract with Werder Bremen and joined 3. Liga side SV Meppen, managed by former Werder Bremen player Torsten Frings, on a season-long loan. He started the season as Meppen's first-choice goalkeeper, but suffered a severe knee injury on his 8th appearance for the club in a match against Dynamo Dresden on 31 October 2020 and was ruled out for several months after undergoing surgery. As a result, the loan was cut short in February 2021 and Plogmann returned to Werder Bremen to continue his rehabilitation.

On 17 October 2022, Plogmann joined Eredivisie club Go Ahead Eagles on a one-year contract. He was signed as a replacement for the injured Jeffrey de Lange and Erwin Mulder.

On 31 July 2023, Plogmann was loaned by Dordrecht for a season.

On 1 September 2026, Plogman moved to Cambuur for two seasons.

== Career statistics ==
As of match played 18 May 2025

Appearances and goals by club, season and competition
Club	Season	League			National cup		Europe		Other		Total	
Club	Season	Division	Apps	Goals	Apps	Goals	Apps	Goals	Apps	Goals	Apps	Goals
Werder Bremen II	2018–19	Regionalliga Nord	13	0	0	0	–		–		13	0
Werder Bremen II	2019–20	Regionalliga Nord	24	0	0	0	–		–		24	0
Werder Bremen II	2021–22	Regionalliga Nord	9	0	0	0	–		–		9	0
Werder Bremen II	Total		46	0	0	0	–		0	0	46	0
Werder Bremen	2018–19	Bundesliga	1	0	0	0	–		–		1	0
Werder Bremen	2019–20	Bundesliga	0	0	0	0	–		–		0	0
Werder Bremen	2020–21	Bundesliga	0	0	0	0	–		–		0	0
Werder Bremen	2021–22	2. Bundesliga	0	0	0	0	–		–		0	0
Werder Bremen	Total		1	0	0	0	–		0	0	1	0
SV Meppen (loan)	2020–21	3. Liga	8	0	0	0	–		–		8	0
Go Ahead Eagles	2022–23	Eredivisie	0	0	0	0	–		–		0	0
Go Ahead Eagles	2024–25	Eredivisie	18	0	2	0	0	0	–		20	0
Go Ahead Eagles	2025–26	Eredivisie	0	0	0	0	0	0	0	0	0	0
Go Ahead Eagles	Total		18	0	2	0	0	0	0	0	20	0
FC Dordrecht (loan)	2023–24	Eerste Divisie	35	0	0	0	–		2 (Note: Appearances in play-offs)	0	37	0
Career total			108	0	2	0	0	0	2	0	112	0

== Honours ==
Go Ahead Eagles

- KNVB Cup: 2024–25
