= 2011–12 Bayer 04 Leverkusen season =

Bayer Leverkusen
2011–12 season
- Sporting Director: Rudi Völler
- Head coach: Robin Dutt (until March 2012); Sami Hyypiä (actual coach since April, but missing coaching license); Sascha Lewandowski (since April, possesses coaching license)
- Stadium: BayArena
- Bundesliga: 5th
- DFB-Pokal: First round
- UEFA Champions League: Round of 16
- Top goalscorer: League: Stefan Kießling (16); All: Stefan Kießling (17)
Home colours	Away colours	Third colours

The 2011–12 Bayer Leverkusen season is the club's 108th year of existence.

== Review and events ==
For the winter break, Bayer Leverkusen return to practice on 3 January 2012 at 10:00 CET (UTC+01) and will have a training camp in Lagos, Portugal, from 4 January to 13 January.

== Competitions ==
=== Bundesliga ===
7 August 2011 1	Mainz 05	2–0	Bayer Leverkusen	Mainz
15:30 CET (UTC+01)	Svensson (yellow card) 27'; Allagui 32'; Polanski (yellow card) 66'; Bungert (yellow card) 74'	Summary	Augusto (yellow card) 43'; Bender (yellow card) 84'; Toprak 86' (o.g.)	Stadium: Coface Arena; Attendance: 32,443; Referee: Michael Weiner

14 August 2011 2	Bayer Leverkusen	1–0	Werder Bremen	Leverkusen
17:30 CET (UTC+01)	Kießling (yellow card) 44'; Kadlec 85'	Summary	Papastathopoulos (yellow card) 47'; Schmitz (yellow card) 83'	Stadium: BayArena; Attendance: 30,210; Referee: Felix Brych

20 August 2011 3	VfB Stuttgart	0–1	Bayer Leverkusen	Stuttgart
15:30 CET (UTC+01)	Boulahrouz (yellow card) 48' (yellow-red card) 90'; Rodríguez (yellow card) 74'	Summary	Kießling 28'	Stadium: Mercedes-Benz Arena; Attendance: 53,000; Referee: Peter Gagelmann

27 August 2011 4	Bayer Leverkusen	0–0	Borussia Dortmund	Leverkusen
18:30 CET (UTC+01)	Kadlec (yellow card) 42' (red card) 64'; Augusto (yellow card) 45+1'	Summary	Hummels (yellow card) 58'; Götze (yellow card) 72' (red card) 77'	Stadium: BayArena; Attendance: 30,210; Referee: Wolfgang Stark

9 September 2011 5	FC Augsburg	1–4	Bayer Leverkusen	Augsburg
20:30 CET (UTC+01)	Hosogai 5'; Sinkala (yellow card) 51'	Summary	Sam 6', 72'; Kießling 23'; Schwaab (yellow card) 25'; Ballack (yellow card) 28'; Derdiyok 79'	Stadium: SGL arena Attendance: 30,660; Referee: Felix Zwayer

17 September 2011 6	Bayer Leverkusen	1–4	1. FC Köln	Leverkusen
15:30 CET (UTC+01)	Rolfes 70'; Schürrle (red card) 90+1'	Summary	Peszko (yellow card) 27'; Novaković 44'; Podolski 47', 54'; Clemens (yellow card) 79'; Rensing (yellow card) 82'; Riether (yellow card) 84'	Stadium: BayArena; Attendance: 30,210; Referee: Günter Perl

24 September 2011 7	Bayern Munich	3–0	Bayer Leverkusen	Munich
18:30 CET (UTC+01)	Müller 5'; Van Buyten 19', (yellow card) 27'; Robben 90'	Summary	Kießling (yellow card) 12'; Toprak (yellow card) 18'; Reinartz (yellow card) 70'; Sam (yellow card) 89'	Stadium: Allianz Arena; Attendance: 69,000; Referee: Manuel Gräfe

1 October 2011 8	Bayer Leverkusen	3–1	VfL Wolfsburg	Leverkusen
15:30 CET (UTC+01)	Castro 14'; Derdiyok 65', (yellow card) 66'; Kießling 85'	Summary	Josué (yellow card) 42'; Mandžukić 59'; Russ (yellow card) 60'	Stadium: BayArena; Attendance: 28,195; Referee: Felix Brych

15 October 2011 9	Borussia Mönchengladbach	2–2	Bayer Leverkusen	Mönchengladbach
15:30 CET (UTC+01)	Arango (yellow card) 28'; Stranzl (yellow card) 54'; Reus 65'; Herrmann 72'	Summary	Reinartz 20', (yellow card) 28'; Ballack (yellow card) 45+2'; Castro (red card) 68'; Kießling (yellow card) 86'; Schürrle 87'	Stadium: Borussia-Park; Attendance: 52,858; Referee: Wolfgang Stark

23 October 2011 10	Bayer Leverkusen	0–1	Schalke 04	Leverkusen
15:30 CET (UTC+01)	Ballack (yellow card) 84'	Summary	Jones (yellow card) 8'; Draxler (yellow card) 63'; Farfán 83'; Huntelaar (yellow card) 87'	Stadium: BayArena; Attendance: 30,120; Referee: Felix Zwayer

28 October 2011 11	SC Freiburg	0–1	Bayer Leverkusen	Freiburg
20:30 CET (UTC+01)		Summary	Ballack 2'	Stadium: Mage Solar Stadion; Attendance: 22,300; Referee: Marco Fritz

5 November 2011 12	Bayer Leverkusen	2–2	Hamburger SV	Leverkusen
18:30 CET (UTC+01)	Schürrle 5'; Bender 20'; Derdiyok (yellow card) 75'; Reinartz (yellow card) 81'	Summary	Westermann 34'; Jansen 58'; Rincón (yellow card) 64'	Stadium: BayArena; Attendance: 30,210; Referee: Knut Kircher

18 November 2011 13	1. FC Kaiserslautern	0–2	Bayer Leverkusen	Kaiserslautern
20:30 CET (UTC+01)	Dick (yellow card) 33'	Summary	Castro (yellow card) 43'; Ballack 54'; Sam 70'	Stadium: Fritz-Walter-Stadion; Attendance: 42,245; Referee: Thorsten Kinhöfer

26 November 2011 14	Hertha BSC	3–3	Bayer Leverkusen	Berlin
15:30 CET (UTC+01)	Lasogga 7', 82'; Toprak 18' (o.g.); Lell (yellow card) 84'	Summary	Derdiyok 24', 64', 79'; Ballack (yellow card) 45'; Castro (yellow card) 87'	Stadium: Olympiastadion; Attendance: 44,541; Referee: Robert Hartmann

2 December 2011 15	Bayer Leverkusen	2–0	1899 Hoffenheim	Leverkusen
20:30 CET (UTC+01)	Derdiyok 11', (yellow card) 67'; Castro (yellow card) 52'; Sam 79'	Summary	Babel (yellow card) 23'; Salihović (yellow card) 86'	Stadium: BayArena; Attendance: 25,948; Referee: Wolfgang Stark

10 December 2011 16	Hannover 96	0–0	Bayer Leverkusen	Hannover
18:30 CET (UTC+01)		Summary	Schürrle (yellow card) 45+1'; Leno (yellow card) 55'	Stadium: AWD-Arena; Attendance: 44,800; Referee: Peter Gagelmann

17 December 2011 17	Bayer Leverkusen	0–3	1. FC Nürnberg	Leverkusen
15:30 CET (UTC+01)		Summary	Didavi 8'; Hegeler 22'; Feulner (yellow card) 52'; Pekhart 73'	Stadium: BayArena; Attendance: 29,239; Referee: Markus Schmidt

22 January 2012 18	Bayer Leverkusen	3–2	Mainz 05	Leverkusen
17:30 CET (UTC+01)	Pospěch 10' (o.g.); Friedrich (yellow card) 32', (goal) 35'; Bender 70'	Summary	Polanski 50'; Caligiuri 53'	Stadium: BayArena; Attendance: 24,365; Referee: Michael Weiner

28 January 2012 19	Werder Bremen	1–1	Bayer Leverkusen	Bremen
15:30 CET (UTC+01)	Pizarro 29'; Rosenberg (yellow card) 52'; Ignjovski (yellow card) 89'; Bargfrede (yellow card) 90+1'	Summary	Castro (yellow card) 15'; Kadlec (yellow card) 44'; Reinartz 57'	Stadium: Weserstadion; Attendance: 40,060; Referee: Deniz Aytekin

4 February 2012 20	Bayer Leverkusen	2–2	VfB Stuttgart	Leverkusen
15:30 CET (UTC+01)	Kießling 11', (yellow card) 89'; Rolfes 47' (pen.); Kadlec (yellow card) 58' (yellow-red card) 63'	Summary	Schieber 24', (yellow card) 81'; Boulahrouz (yellow card) 47'; Kvist (yellow card) 73'; Ibišević (yellow card) 85'; Cacau (yellow card) 88'; Harnik 89', (yellow card) 90+3'	Stadium: BayArena; Attendance: 27,929; Referee: Thorsten Kinhöfer

11 February 2012 21	Borussia Dortmund	1–0	Bayer Leverkusen	Dortmund
15:30 CET (UTC+01)	Kagawa 45'	Summary		Stadium: Signal Iduna Park; Attendance: 80,400; Referee: Günter Perl

18 February 2012 22	Bayer Leverkusen	4–1	FC Augsburg	Leverkusen
15:30 CET (UTC+01)	Kießling 25', 64'; Castro 60'; Schürrle 70'	Summary	Ostrzolek (yellow card) 21'; Koo 50'; Mölders (yellow card) 56'; Callsen-Bracker (yellow card) 58'; Langkamp (yellow card) 68'	Stadium: BayArena; Attendance: 23,368; Referee: Guido Winkmann

25 February 2012 23	1. FC Köln	0–2	Bayer Leverkusen	Cologne
15:30 CET (UTC+01)	Riether (yellow card) 22'	Summary	Bender 16', 50'	Stadium: RheinEnergieStadion; Attendance: 46,500; Referee: Felix Brych

3 March 2012 24	Bayer Leverkusen	2–0	Bayern Munich	Leverkusen
15:30 CET (UTC+01)	Toprak (yellow card) 66'; Kießling 79'; Reinartz (yellow card) 81'; Bellarabi 90'	Summary	Boateng (yellow card) 65'; Luiz Gustavo (yellow card) 84'; Rafinha (yellow card) 90+4'	Stadium: BayArena; Attendance: 30,210; Referee: Manuel Gräfe

10 March 2012 25	VfL Wolfsburg	3–2	Bayer Leverkusen	Wolfsburg
15:30 CET (UTC+01)	Helmes 33', (yellow card) 50'; Dejagah 45', (yellow card) 87'; Schäfer (yellow card) 45+2'; Hadlec 61' (o.g.)Russ (yellow card) 74'; Lopes (yellow card) 90'	Summary	Kießling 3' Bender (yellow card) 75'; Derdiyok 90+1'	Stadium: Volkswagen Arena; Attendance: 26,112; Referee: Felix Zwayer

17 March 2012 26	Bayer Leverkusen	1–2	Borussia Mönchengladbach	Leverkusen
15:30 CET (UTC+01)	Toprak (yellow card) 59'; Schwaab (yellow card) 69'; Kießling 75'	Summary	Reus 7'; Stranzl (yellow card) 57'; Nordtveit (yellow card) 85'; De Camargo 88'	Stadium: BayArena; Attendance: 30,210; Referee: Florian Meyer

24 March 2012 27	Schalke 04	2–0	Bayer Leverkusen	Gelsenkirchen
18:30 CET (UTC+01)	Huntelaar 18', 86'; Jones (yellow card) 75'	Summary	Kadlec (yellow card) 12'; Toprak (yellow card) 59'	Stadium: Veltins-Arena; Attendance: 61,673; Referee: Deniz Aytekin

31 March 2012 28	Bayer Leverkusen	0–2	SC Freiburg	Leverkusen
15:30 CET (UTC+01)	Kadlec (yellow card) 64'	Summary	Schuster 8'; Guédé (yellow card) 28'; Caligiuri 60'; Freis (yellow card) 77'; Reisinger (yellow card) 86'	Stadium: BayArena; Attendance: 28,342; Referee: Robert Hartmann

8 April 2012 29	Hamburger SV	1–1	Bayer Leverkusen	Hamburg
17:30 CET (UTC+01)	Petrić 40' (pen.); Aogo (yellow card) 61'; Jarolím (yellow card) 62'	Summary	Friedrich (yellow card) 40'; Schürrle 55'; Rolfes (yellow card) 80'	Stadium: Imtech Arena; Attendance: 54,141; Referee: Wolfgang Stark

11 April 2012 30	Bayer Leverkusen	3–1	1. FC Kaiserslautern	Leverkusen
20:00 CET (UTC+01)	Kießling 1'; Rolfes 57'; Reinartz 69'	Summary	Derstroff 42'; Dick (yellow card) 56'	Stadium: BayArena; Attendance: 28,000; Referee: Felix Zwayer

14 April 2012 31	Bayer Leverkusen	3–3	Hertha BSC	Leverkusen
15:30 CET (UTC+01)	Schürrle 44'; Kießling 51', 84'; Reinartz (yellow card) 74'	Summary	Perdedaj (yellow card) 35'; Lasogga 63'; Torun 71', 77'	Stadium: BayArena; Attendance: 29,704; Referee: Michael Weiner

21 April 2012 32	1899 Hoffenheim	0–1	Bayer Leverkusen	Sinsheim
15:30 CET (UTC+01)	Beck (yellow card) 63'	Summary	Schürrle 79'	Stadium: Rhein-Neckar Arena; Attendance: 28,150; Referee: Felix Brych

28 April 2012 33	Bayer Leverkusen	1–0	Hannover 96	Leverkusen
15:30 CET (UTC+01)	Reinartz (yellow card) 33'; Kießling 75'	Summary		Stadium: BayArena; Attendance: 30,210; Referee: Tobias Welz

5 May 2012 34	1. FC Nürnberg	1–4	Bayer Leverkusen	Nuremberg
15:30 CET (UTC+01)	Mak 58'; Balitsch (yellow card) 66'; Pinola (yellow card) 86'	Summary	Kießling 6', 32', 89'; Friedrich (yellow card) 21'; Toprak (yellow card) 24'; Schürrle 77'	Stadium: easyCredit-Stadion; Attendance: 48,548; Referee: Guido Winkmann

|} Last updated: 5 May 2012
Source: https://www.kicker.de/
^{1}Bayer Leverkusen goals come first.
Ground's country's flag and opponent's country's flag shown when from a different country of Bayer Leverkusen.
Pos. = Position in league, Pts. = Points, GD = Goal difference, Ground: H = Home, A = Away, N = Neutral, HR = Home replacement, AR = Away replacement.

=== DFB-Pokal ===
30 July 2011 First round	Dynamo Dresden	4–3 (a.e.t.)	Bayer Leverkusen	Dresden
15:30 CEST	Schuppan 68'; Koch 70', 86'; Schnetzler 117'	Match Report	6' Derdiyok; 12' Sam; 49' Schürrle	Stadium: Glücksgas Stadium; Attendance: 25.959; Referee: Günter Perl (Pullach)

=== UEFA Champions League ===
==== Group stage ====
Group E
Team	Pld	W	D	L	GF	GA	GD	Pts
(England) Chelsea	6	3	2	1	13	4	+9	11
(Germany) Bayer Leverkusen	6	3	1	2	8	8	0	10
(Spain) Valencia	6	2	2	2	12	7	+5	8
(Belgium) Genk	6	0	3	3	2	16	−14	3

13 September 2011 1	Chelsea (England)	2–0	(Germany) Bayer Leverkusen	London, England
20:45 CEST	David Luiz 67'; Mata 67'	Report		Stadium: Stamford Bridge; Attendance: 33,820; Referee: Stéphane Lannoy (France)

28 September 2011 2	Bayer Leverkusen (Germany)	2–0	(Belgium) Genk	Leverkusen, Germany
20:45 CEST	Bender 30'; Ballack 90+2'	Report		Stadium: BayArena; Attendance: 25,138; Referee: Alan Kelly (Republic of Ireland

19 October 2011 3	Bayer Leverkusen (Germany)	2–1	(Spain) Valencia	Leverkusen, Germany
20:45 CEST	Schürrle 52'; Sam 56'	Report	Jonas 24'	Stadium: BayArena; Attendance: 26,384; Referee: Craig Thomson (Scotland)

1 November 2011 4	Valencia (Spain)	3–1	(Germany) Bayer Leverkusen	Valencia, Spain
20:45 CET	Jonas 1'; Soldado 65'; Rami 75'	Report	Kießling 31'	Stadium: Mestalla Stadium; Attendance: 37,047; Referee: Eriksson

23 November 2011 5	Bayer Leverkusen (Germany)	2–1	(England) Chelsea	Leverkusen, Germany
20:45 CET	Derdiyok 73'; Friedrich 90+1'	Report	Drogba 48'	Stadium: BayArena; Attendance: 29,285; Referee: Viktor Kassai (Hungary)

6 December 2011 6	Genk (Belgium)	1–1	(Germany) Bayer Leverkusen	Genk, Belgium
20:45 CET	Vossen 30'	Report	Derdiyok 79'	Stadium: Cristal Arena; Attendance: 21,187; Referee: Paolo Tagliavento (Italy

==== Knockout phase ====
===== Round of 16 =====
14 February 2012 First leg	Bayer Leverkusen (Germany)	1–3	(Spain) Barcelona	Leverkusen, Germany
20:45 CET	Kadlec 51'		Sánchez 41', 55'; Messi 88'	Stadium: BayArena; Attendance: 29,400; Referee: Craig Thomson (Scotland)

7 March 2012 Second leg	Barcelona (Spain)	7–1 (10–2 agg.)	(Germany) Bayer Leverkusen	Barcelona, Spain
20:45 CET	Messi 25', 43', 49', 58', 85'; Tello 55', 62'		Bellarabi 90+1'	Stadium: Camp Nou; Attendance: 75,632; Referee: Svein Oddvar Moen (Norway)

== Player information ==
=== Roster and statistics ===
As of 16 December 2011

Squad Season 2011–12
Player					Bundesliga		DFB-Pokal		Champions League		Totals	
Player	Nat.	Birthday	at Bayer since	Previous club	Matches	Goals	Matches	Goal	Matches	Goals	Matches	Goals
Goalkeepers
René Adler	German	15 January 1985	2000	VfB Leipzig	0	0	0	0	0	0	0	0
Fabian Giefer	German	17 May 1990	2003	TuRa Lommersdorf	1	0	0	0	0	0	1	0
Bernd Leno	German	4 March 1992	2011	VfB Stuttgart	14	0	0	0	6	0	20	0
David Yelldell	American	1 October 1981	2011	MSV Duisburg	0	0	1	0	0	0	1	0
Defenders
Gonzalo Castro	German	11 June 1987	1999	Bayer Wuppertal	12	1	1	0	6	0	19	1
Danny da Costa	German	13 July 1993	2001	Winfriedia Mülheim	1	0	0	0	0	0	1	0
Manuel Friedrich	German	13 September 1979	2007	Mainz 05	8	0	0	0	3	1	11	1
Michal Kadlec	Czech	13 December 1984	2008	Sparta Prague	12	1	1	0	6	1	19	2
Bastian Oczipka	German	12 January 1989	2011	FC St. Pauli	2	0	0	0	2	0	4	0
Stefan Reinartz	German	1 January 1989	2009	1. FC Nürnberg	14	1	1	0	5	0	20	1
Daniel Schwaab	German	1 January 1989	2009	SC Freiburg	11	0	0	0	3	0	14	0
Ömer Toprak	Turkish	21 July 1989	2011	SC Freiburg	13	0	1	0	5	0	19	0
Midfielders
Hanno Balitsch	German	2 January 1981	2010	Hannover 96	8	0	1	0	2	0	11	0
Michael Ballack	German	26 September 1976	2010	Chelsea	11	2	1	0	6	1	18	3
Tranquillo Barnetta	Swiss	22 May 1985	2005	Hannover 96	0	0	0	0	0	0	0	0
Karim Bellarabi	German	8 April 1990	2011	Eintracht Braunschweig	2	0	1	0	0	0	3	0
Lars Bender	German	27 April 1989	2009	1860 Munich	15	1	1	0	6	1	22	2
Michael Ortega	Colombian	6 April 1991	2011	Atlas	0	0	0	0	0	0	0	0
Renato Augusto	Brazilian	8 February 1988	2008	Flamengo	7	0	1	0	2	0	10	0
Simon Rolfes	German	21 January 1982	2005	Alemannia Aachen	15	1	1	0	6	0	22	1
Sidney Sam	German	27 April 1989	2010	1. FC Kaiserslautern	15	4	1	1	6	1	22	6
Forwards
Eren Derdiyok	Swiss	12 June 1988	2009	Basel	12	6	1	1	6	2	19	9
Nicolai Jørgensen	Danish	15 January 1991	2010	AB	1	0	0	0	2	0	3	0
Stefan Kießling	German	25 January 1984	2006	1. FC Nürnberg	15	3	1	0	6	1	22	4
André Schürrle	German	6 November 1990	2011	Mainz 05	12	2	1	1	6	1	19	4

=== Transfers ===
==== In ====
No.	Pos.	Nat.	Name	Age	EU	Moving from	Type	Transfer window	Ends	Transfer fee	Source
4	DF	(Germany)	Bastian Oczipka	37	EU	FC St. Pauli (Germany)	loan return	Summer			
9	FW	(Germany)	André Schürrle	20	EU	Mainz 05 (Germany)	Transfer	Summer			
17	MF	(Colombia)	Michael Javier Ortega	35	Non-EU	Atlas (Mexico)	loan	Summer	2012		
21	DF	(Turkey)	Ömer Toprak	21	EU	SC Freiburg (Germany)	Transfer	Summer	2016		
22	GK	(United States)	David Yelldell	45	EU	MSV Duisburg (Germany)	Transfer	Summer			
22	GK	(Germany)	Bernd Leno	34	EU	Bayer Leverkusen (Germany)	loan	Summer	2012		
38	FW	(Germany)	Karim Bellarabi	36	EU	Eintracht Braunschweig (Germany)	Transfer	Summer			

==== Out ====
No.	Pos.	Nat.	Name	Age	EU	Moving to	Type	Transfer window	Transfer fee	Source
4	DF	(Finland)	Sami Hyypiä	53	EU		Retirement	Summer		
17	DF	(Croatia)	Domagoj Vida	37	Non-EU	Dinamo Zagreb (Croatia)	Transfer	Summer		
22	GK	(Germany)	Benedikt Fernandez	41	EU		Release	Summer		
23	MF	(Chile)	Arturo Vidal	39	Non-EU	Juventus (Italy)	Transfer	Summer		
26	DF	(Slovenia)	Kevin Kampl	36	EU	VfL Osnabrück (Germany)	Transfer	Summer		

== Kits ==
Home	Home Alternate	Away	Third

Type	Shirt	Shorts	Socks	First appearance / Info
Home	Black	Black	Black	
Home Alt.	Black	Black	Red	Bundesliga, Match 29, April 8 against Hamburg
Away	White	White	White	
Third	Blue	Blue	Blue	
