= Ömer Toprak =

Turkish footballer (born 1989)

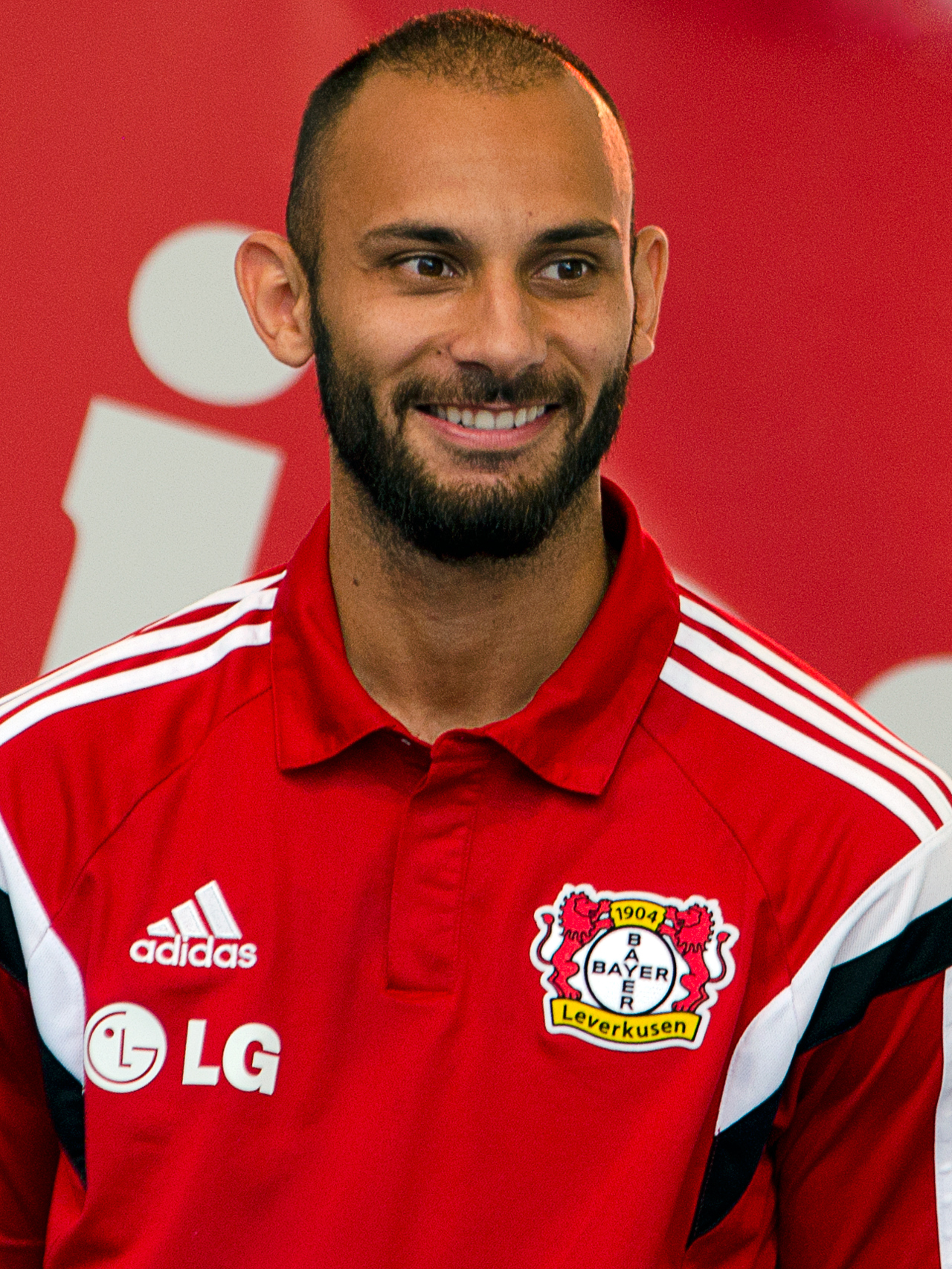
- Toprak with Bayer Leverkusen in 2014

Personal information
- Date of birth: 21 July 1989 (age 37)
- Place of birth: Ravensburg, West Germany
- Height: 1.86 m (6 ft 1 in)
- Position: Centre back

Team information
- Current team: Real Sociedad (assistant)

Youth career
- 1994–2001: TSB Ravensburg
- 2001–2005: FV Ravensburg
- 2005–2008: SC Freiburg

Senior career*
Years	Team	Apps	(Gls)
2008–2011	SC Freiburg	68	(4)
2011–2017	Bayer Leverkusen	154	(5)
2017–2020	Borussia Dortmund	35	(0)
2019–2020	→ Werder Bremen (loan)	10	(0)
2020–2022	Werder Bremen	47	(3)
2022–2024	Antalyaspor	45	(1)
Total		359	(13)

International career
2008	Germany U19	3	(1)
2011–2017	Turkey	27	(2)

Managerial career
- 2025–: Real Sociedad (assistant)
Medal record
Representing Germany
Men's football
UEFA European Under-19 Championship
Winner	2008 Czech Republic
- * Club domestic league appearances and goals

Ömer Toprak (born 21 July 1989) is a football coach and former player who is assistant coach of La Liga club Real Sociedad. Born in Germany, he played for the Turkey national team.

== Club career ==
Toprak began his career with TSB Ravensburg in 1994. In 2001, he moved to FV Ravensburg.

=== SC Freiburg ===
Toprak signed for SC Freiburg in 2005. Three years later, He signed his first professional contract in the 2007–08 season. During that period, he played for Freiburg U19 and the reserve team and won 22 games with the latter.

In his first professional season, he featured in 26 league games and scored 4 goals as Freiburg won the 2. Bundesliga and promoted after a defeat of VfL Osnabrück. On 9 June 2009, Toprak suffered from a karting accident, causing him to miss the first half of the 2009–10 season but he recovered, scoring a goal against Hamburger SV on the 65th minute. Toprak played 24 league games during the 2010–11 season.

=== Bayer Leverkusen ===
Bayer 04 Leverkusen signed Toprak as a replacement for newly retired Sami Hyypiä for a reported transfer fee of €2 to 3 million. He appeared in the match versus Dynamo Dresden in the 2011–12 DFB-Pokal but they were eliminated 4–3. In Bayer's first match against Mainz 05, he scored an own goal, causing his team to lose 2–0. He scored another own goal against Hertha BSC. Bayer managed to qualify to the Champions League round of 16, where they were eliminated by FC Barcelona.

In January 2014, Toprak agreed a contract extension until 2018.

=== Werder Bremen ===
In August 2019, Toprak joined Werder Bremen on a year-long loan from Borussia Dortmund. Werder Bremen announced the deal includes an purchase obligation to permanently sign Toprak that would come into effect with a "high likelihood"; the reported transfer fee agreed for that case was reported as €5 to 6 million. The permanent signing took effect in July 2020.

=== Antalyaspor ===
On 30 June 2022, Toprak signed a two-year contract with Antalyaspor.

He retired from playing in November 2024.

== International career ==
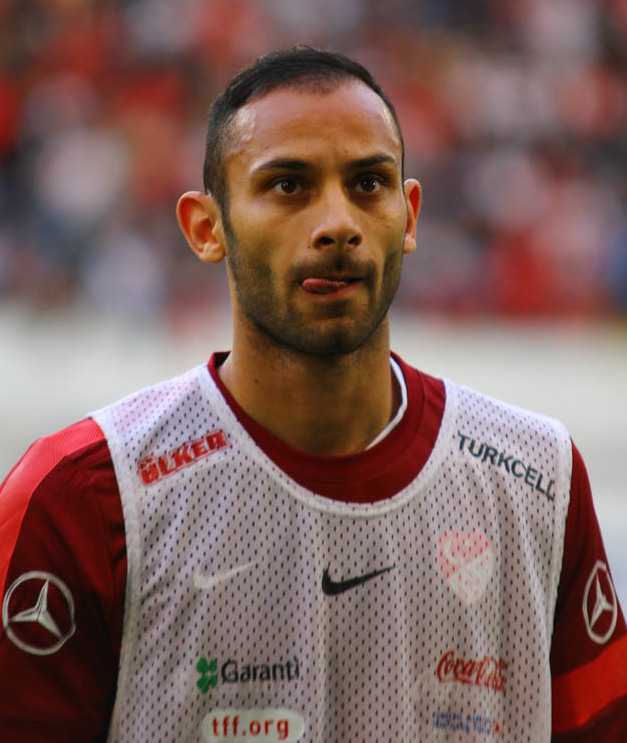
Toprak with Turkey in 2013

He was included in the Germany U19 that won the 2008 UEFA European Under-19 Championship. He appeared in three matches during the tournament, scoring one goal.

On 30 September 2011, Toprak was named to the Turkey national team by coach Guus Hiddink for the upcoming UEFA Euro 2012 qualifying matches against Germany and Azerbaijan. He made his Turkish debut on 15 November against Croatia in the second leg of UEFA Euro 2012 qualifying play-offs, playing the full 90 minutes of a goalless draw at the Stadion Maksimir in Zagreb which ensured that Croatia advanced to the finals 3–0 on aggregate.

== Personal life ==
Toprak is the son of Turkish immigrants from Sivas. He was born and raised in Ravensburg, Baden-Württemberg. He has one older sister and two older brothers one of whom, Harun, is also a professional football player for FV Ravensburg. His cousin, Rahman Soyudoğru, has also played professional football, including in Germany and Turkey.

On 9 June 2009, Toprak was involved in a karting accident, in which he suffered severe burns and had to be treated in a special clinic. He was able to resume training after only four months.

== Career statistics ==
=== Club ===
Appearances and goals by club, season and competition
Club	Season	League			National cup (Note: Includes DFB-Pokal, Turkish Cup)		Europe		Other		Total	
Club	Season	Division	Apps	Goals	Apps	Goals	Apps	Goals	Apps	Goals	Apps	Goals
SC Freiburg	2008–09	2. Bundesliga	30	4	1	0	—		—		31	4
SC Freiburg	2009–10	Bundesliga	14	0	0	0	—		—		14	0
SC Freiburg	2010–11	Bundesliga	24	0	1	0	—		—		25	0
SC Freiburg	Total		68	4	2	0	—		—		70	4
Bayer Leverkusen	2011–12	Bundesliga	27	0	1	0	6 (Note: Appearances in UEFA Champions League)	0	—		34	0
Bayer Leverkusen	2012–13	Bundesliga	26	1	2	0	4 (Note: Appearances in UEFA Europa League)	0	—		32	1
Bayer Leverkusen	2013–14	Bundesliga	28	1	3	0	8	2	—		39	3
Bayer Leverkusen	2014–15	Bundesliga	29	1	3	0	9	0	—		41	1
Bayer Leverkusen	2015–16	Bundesliga	19	1	2	0	4 (Note: Three appearances in UEFA Champions League, one appearance in UEFA Europa League)	0	—		25	1
Bayer Leverkusen	2016–17	Bundesliga	25	1	1	0	6	0	—		32	1
Bayer Leverkusen	Total		154	5	12	0	37	2	—		203	7
Borussia Dortmund	2017–18	Bundesliga	26	0	1	0	9 (Note: Six appearances in UEFA Champions League, three appearances in UEFA Europa League)	0	0	0	36	0
Borussia Dortmund	2018–19	Bundesliga	9	0	2	0	3	0	—		14	0
Borussia Dortmund	2019–20	Bundesliga	0	0	0	0	0	0	1 (Note: Appearance in DFL-Supercup)	0	1	0
Borussia Dortmund	Total		35	0	3	0	12	0	1	0	51	0
Werder Bremen (loan)	2019–20	Bundesliga	10	0	2	0	—		—		12	0
Werder Bremen	2020–21	Bundesliga	26	2	1	0	—		—		27	2
Werder Bremen	2021–22	2. Bundesliga	21	1	1	0	—		—		22	1
Werder Bremen	Total		47	3	2	0	—		—		49	3
Antalyaspor	2022–23	Süper Lig	23	1	1	0	—		—		25	1
Antalyaspor	2023–24	Süper Lig	22	0	0	0	—		—		22	0
Antalyaspor	Total		45	1	1	0	—		—		47	1
Career total			359	13	22	0	49	2	1	0	432	15

=== International ===
Appearances and goals by national team and year
National team	Year	Apps	Goals
Turkey	2011	1	0
Turkey	2012	10	2
Turkey	2013	8	0
Turkey	2014	4	0
Turkey	2015	0	0
Turkey	2016	2	0
Turkey	2017	2	0
Total		27	2

Scores and results list Turkey's goal tally first, score column indicates score after each Toprak goal.

List of international goals scored by Ömer Toprak
No.	Date	Venue	Opponent	Score	Result	Competition
1	29 February 2012	Bursa Atatürk Stadium, Bursa, Turkey	Slovakia	1–2	1–2	Friendly
2	29 May 2012	Red Bull Arena, Salzburg, Austria	Bulgaria	1–0	2–0	Friendly

== Honours ==
SC Freiburg

- 2. Bundesliga: 2008–09

Borussia Dortmund

- DFL-Supercup: 2019

Germany U19

- UEFA European Under-19 Championship: 2008
