= 2019–20 SV Werder Bremen season =

Werder Bremen
2019–20 season
- Chairman: Marco Bode
- Head coach: Florian Kohfeldt
- Stadium: Weser-Stadion
- Bundesliga: 16th (play-off winners)
- DFB-Pokal: Quarter-finals
- Top goalscorer: League: Milot Rashica (8); All: Milot Rashica (11)
- Highest home attendance: 42,100 (vs Fortuna Düsseldorf, 17 August 2019) (vs Schalke 04, 23 November 2019)
- Lowest home attendance: 37,720 (vs Mainz 05, 17 December 2019)
- Average home league attendance: 40,604
- Biggest win: Atlas Delmenhorst 1–6 Werder Bremen
- Biggest defeat: Bayern Munich 6–1 Werder Bremen; Werder Bremen 0–5 Mainz 05
Home colours	Away colours	Third colours

The 2019–20 season was SV Werder Bremen's 121st season in existence and the club's 39th consecutive season in the top flight of German football. In addition to the domestic league, Werder Bremen participated in this season's edition of the DFB-Pokal. The season was slated to cover a period from 1 July 2019 to 30 June 2020. It was extended extraordinarily beyond 30 June due to the COVID-19 pandemic in Germany.

== Players ==
=== Current squad ===
As of 31 January 2020

Note: Flags indicate national team as defined under FIFA eligibility rules; some limited exceptions apply. Players may hold more than one non-FIFA nationality.

No.	Pos.	Nation	Player
1	GK	CZE	Jiří Pavlenka
3	DF	GER	Kevin Vogt (on loan from 1899 Hoffenheim)
4	DF	SUI	Michael Lang (on loan from Borussia Mönchengladbach)
5	DF	SWE	Ludwig Augustinsson
6	MF	GER	Kevin Möhwald
7	MF	KOS	Milot Rashica
8	FW	JPN	Yuya Osako
9	FW	GER	Davie Selke (on loan from Hertha BSC)
10	MF	GER	Leonardo Bittencourt (on loan from 1899 Hoffenheim)
11	FW	GER	Niclas Füllkrug
13	DF	SRB	Miloš Veljković
14	FW	PER	Claudio Pizarro
15	DF	GER	Sebastian Langkamp
17	MF	TUR	Nuri Şahin
18	DF	FIN	Niklas Moisander (captain)
19	FW	USA	Josh Sargent

No.	Pos.	Nation	Player
21	DF	TUR	Ömer Toprak (on loan from Borussia Dortmund)
22	MF	GER	Fin Bartels
23	DF	CZE	Theodor Gebre Selassie (vice-captain)
24	FW	GER	Johannes Eggestein
26	MF	ITA	Simon Straudi
27	GK	GRE	Stefanos Kapino
28	MF	BUL	Ilia Gruev
29	FW	GER	Luc Ihorst
30	MF	NED	Davy Klaassen
32	DF	AUT	Marco Friedl
35	MF	GER	Maximilian Eggestein
36	DF	GER	Christian Groß
39	MF	GER	Benjamin Goller
40	GK	GER	Luca Plogmann
41	FW	GER	Nick Woltemade
44	MF	GER	Philipp Bargfrede

=== Players out on loan ===
Note: Flags indicate national team as defined under FIFA eligibility rules; some limited exceptions apply. Players may hold more than one non-FIFA nationality.

No.	Pos.	Nation	Player
34	MF	GER	Jean-Manuel Mbom (to KFC Uerdingen until 30 June 2020)
36	DF	GER	Thore Jacobsen (to Magdeburg until 30 June 2020)
—	FW	AUT	Martin Harnik (to Hamburger SV until 30 June 2020)
—	GK	GER	Michael Zetterer (to PEC Zwolle until 30 June 2020)
—	DF	GER	Jan-Niklas Beste (to FC Emmen until 30 June 2020)
—	MF	GER	Niklas Schmidt (to VfL Osnabrück until 30 June 2021)

No.	Pos.	Nation	Player
—	DF	GER	Jannes Vollert (to Hallescher FC until 30 June 2021)
—	MF	GER	Ole Käuper (to Carl Zeiss Jena until 30 June 2020)
—	MF	GER	Boubacar Barry (to KFC Uerdingen until 30 June 2020)
—	MF	AUT	Romano Schmid (to Wolfsberger AC until 30 June 2020)
—	DF	SWE	Felix Beijmo (to Greuther Fürth until 30 June 2020)
—	FW	GHA	Jonah Osabutey (to Royal Excel Mouscron until 30 June 2021)

== Friendly matches ==
Win Draw Loss

13 July 2019 Friendly	Werder Bremen	1–1	Darmstadt 98	Zell am Ziller, Austria
12:30 CEST (UTC+2)	Goller 76'		Herrmann 37'	Stadium: Parkstadion Zell am Ziller

20 July 2019 Friendly	Werder Bremen	1–0	1. FC Köln	Lohne, Germany
16:30 CEST (UTC+2)	Sargent 54'			Stadium: Heinz-Dettmer-Stadion

28 July 2019 Friendly	Werder Bremen	4–0	Eibar	Grassau, Germany
11:00 CEST (UTC+2)	Klaassen 51' (pen.); Osako 61'; Füllkrug 70', 75'			Stadium: Sportzentrum Brandstätt; Attendance: 1,000

3 August 2019 Friendly	Werder Bremen	0–0	Everton	Bremen, Germany
15:00 CEST (UTC+2)				Stadium: Weser-Stadion

12 January 2020 Friendly	Werder Bremen	3–1	Hannover 96	Bremen, Germany
13:00 CET (UTC+1)	Sargent 32', 43'; Rashica 59'		Prib 30'	Stadium: Weserstadion Platz 11

== Competitions ==
Win Draw Loss

=== Overview ===
Competition	First match	Last match	Starting round	Final position	Record							
Competition	First match	Last match	Starting round	Final position	Pld	W	D	L	GF	GA	GD	Win %
Bundesliga	17 August 2019	27 June 2020	Matchday 1	16th	34	8	7	19	42	69	−27	23.53
Bundesliga relegation play-offs	2 July 2020	6 July 2020	First leg	Winners	2	0	2	0	2	2	+0	0.00
DFB-Pokal	10 August 2019	4 March 2020	First round	Quarter-finals	4	3	0	1	13	6	+7	75.00
Total					40	11	9	20	57	77	−20	27.50

Last updated: 6 July 2020
Source: Soccerway

=== Bundesliga ===
==== League table ====
Pos	Team	Pld	W	D	L	GF	GA	GD	Pts	Qualification or relegation
14	1. FC Köln	34	10	6	18	51	69	−18	36	
15	FC Augsburg	34	9	9	16	45	63	−18	36	
16	Werder Bremen (O)	34	8	7	19	42	69	−27	31	Qualification for the relegation play-offs
17	Fortuna Düsseldorf (R)	34	6	12	16	36	67	−31	30	Relegation to 2. Bundesliga
18	SC Paderborn (R)	34	4	8	22	37	74	−37	20	Relegation to 2. Bundesliga

Source: DFB
Rules for classification: 1) Points; 2) Goal difference; 3) Goals scored; 4) Head-to-head results; 5) Head-to-head away goals scored; 6) Away goals scored; 7) Play-off.
(O) Play-off winners; (R) Relegated

==== Results summary ====
Overall								Home						Away					
Pld	W	D	L	GF	GA	GD	Pts	W	D	L	GF	GA	GD	W	D	L	GF	GA	GD
34	8	7	19	42	69	−27	31	2	3	12	15	36	−21	6	4	7	27	33	−6

Last updated: 27 June 2020.
Source: Bundesliga

==== Results by round ====
Round	1	2	3	4	5	6	7	8	9	10	11	12	13	14	15	16	17	18	19	20	21	22	23	24	25	26	27	28	29	30	31	32	33	34
Ground	H	A	H	A	H	A	A	H	A	H	A	H	A	H	A	H	A	A	H	A	H	A	H	H	A	H	A	H	A	H	A	H	H	A
Result	L	L	W	W	L	D	D	D	D	D	L	L	W	L	L	L	L	W	L	L	L	L	L	L	D	L	W	D	W	L	W	L	L	W
Position	15	15	13	10	10	12	11	12	12	12	14	14	12	14	15	16	17	16	16	16	17	17	17	17	17	17	17	17	17	17	17	17	17	16

Updated to match(es) played on 27 June 2020. Source: Bundesliga
A = Away; H = Home; W = Win; D = Draw; L = Loss

==== Matches ====
The Bundesliga schedule was announced on 28 June 2019.

17 August 2019 1	Werder Bremen	1–3	Fortuna Düsseldorf	Bremen
15:30 CEST (UTC+2)	Eggestein 47'	Report	Karaman (yellow card) 17', (goal) 52'; Thommy (yellow card) 28'; Hennings 36'; Ayhan 64'	Stadium: Weser-Stadion; Attendance: 42,100; Referee: Felix Zwayer

24 August 2019 2	1899 Hoffenheim	3–2	Werder Bremen	Hoffenheim
15:30 CEST (UTC+2)	Rudy (yellow card) 46'; Bičakčić 54'; Bebou 59'; Kadeřábek 87'; Bittencourt (yellow card) 90+1'	Report	Klaassen (yellow card) 35'; Füllkrug 42'; Eggestein (yellow card) 69' (yellow-red card) 77'; Osako 81'; Moisander (yellow card) 90+2'; Harnik (yellow card) 90+4'	Stadium: Rhein-Neckar-Arena; Attendance: 27,333; Referee: Sascha Stegemann

1 September 2019 3	Werder Bremen	3–2	FC Augsburg	Bremen
15:30 CEST (UTC+2)	Osako 6', 67'; Sargent 21'; Pavlenka (yellow card) 90+2'	Report	Vargas 12', 46', (yellow card) 26'; Lichtsteiner (yellow card) 23' (yellow-red card) 34'; Niederlechner (yellow card) 90'	Stadium: Weser-Stadion; Attendance: 40,041; Referee: Sören Storks

14 September 2019 4	Union Berlin	1–2	Werder Bremen	Berlin
15:30 CEST (UTC+2)	Andersson 14' (pen.); Subotić (yellow card) 80' (yellow-red card) 89'	Report	Klaassen 5' (pen.); Füllkrug 55'; Şahin (yellow card) 76' (yellow-red card) 90+1'	Stadium: Stadion An der Alten Försterei; Attendance: 22,012; Referee: Tobias Welz

21 September 2019 5	Werder Bremen	0–3	RB Leipzig	Bremen
18:30 CEST (UTC+2)		Report	Orbán 13'; Konaté (yellow card) 29'; Sabitzer 35'; Laimer (yellow card) 43' (yellow-red card) 64'; Saracchi 83'	Stadium: Weser-Stadion; Attendance: 40,550; Referee: Tobias Stieler

28 September 2019 6	Borussia Dortmund	2–2	Werder Bremen	Dortmund
18:30 CEST (UTC+2)	Götze 9'; Reus 41'; Weigl (yellow card) 68'	Report	Rashica 7'; Friedl 55'	Stadium: Signal Iduna Park; Attendance: 81,365; Referee: Deniz Aytekin

6 October 2019 7	Eintracht Frankfurt	2–2	Werder Bremen	Frankfurt
18:00 CEST (UTC+2)	Hinteregger (yellow card) 40'; Rode 55'; Silva 88'; Hasebe (yellow card) 90+1'	Report	Klaassen 27'; Rashica (yellow card) 43', (goal) 90+1' (pen.)	Stadium: Commerzbank-Arena; Attendance: 51,500; Referee: Guido Winkmann

19 October 2019 8	Werder Bremen	1–1	Hertha BSC	Bremen
15:30 CEST (UTC+2)	Sargent 7'; Bittencourt (yellow card) 80'	Report	Klünter (yellow card) 58'; Lukebakio 70'	Stadium: Weser-Stadion; Attendance: 41,447; Referee: Felix Brych

26 October 2019 9	Bayer Leverkusen	2–2	Werder Bremen	Leverkusen
18:30 CEST (UTC+2)	Toprak 4' (o.g.); L. Bender (yellow card) 51'; Alario 58', (yellow card) 88'	Report	Rashica 40'; Klaassen 48', (yellow card) 76'	Stadium: BayArena; Attendance: 30,210; Referee: Martin Petersen

2 November 2019 10	Werder Bremen	2–2	SC Freiburg	Bremen
15:30 CET (UTC+1)	Rashica 9'; Bittencourt (yellow card) 57'; Gebre Selassie 59'; Şahin (yellow card) 64'; Veljković (yellow card) 83'	Report	Petersen 28', 90+3'; Günter (yellow card) 62'; Frantz (yellow card) 75'; Haberer (yellow card) 79' (yellow-red card) 87'	Stadium: Weser-Stadion; Attendance: 41,000; Referee: Christian Dingert

10 November 2019 11	Borussia Mönchengladbach	3–1	Werder Bremen	Mönchengladbach
13:30 CET (UTC+1)	Elvedi (yellow card) 14'; Bensebaini 20', (yellow card) 52' (yellow-red card) 87'; Herrmann 22', 59', (yellow card) 70'; Lainer (yellow card) 25'	Report	Veljković (yellow card) 38'; Şahin (yellow card) 57'; Klaassen (yellow card) 75'; Friedl (yellow card) 81'; Bittencourt 90+3'	Stadium: Borussia-Park; Attendance: 54,022; Referee: Tobias Stieler

23 November 2019 12	Werder Bremen	1–2	Schalke 04	Bremen
15:30 CET (UTC+1)	Eggestein (yellow card) 51'; Langkamp (yellow card) 55'; Bargfrede (yellow card) 70'; Osako 80'	Report	Harit 43'; Raman 53'; Nastasić (yellow card) 72'; Mascarell (yellow card) 87'	Stadium: Weser-Stadion; Attendance: 42,100; Referee: Benjamin Cortus

1 December 2019 13	VfL Wolfsburg	2–3	Werder Bremen	Wolfsburg
18:00 CET (UTC+1)	Weghorst 36'; William 73'; Arnold (yellow card) 90+2'	Report	Rashica 13' (pen.), 83', (yellow card) 81'; Bittencourt 39'; Groß (yellow card) 61'; Osako (yellow card) 68'; Veljković (yellow card) 90+5'	Stadium: Volkswagen Arena; Attendance: 26,012; Referee: Robert Kampka

8 December 2019 14	Werder Bremen	0–1	SC Paderborn	Bremen
18:00 CET (UTC+1)	Gebre Selassie (yellow card) 84'	Report	Gjasula (yellow card) 31'; Mamba (yellow card) 41'; Vasiliadis (yellow card) 59'; Collins (yellow card) 84'; Michel 90'	Stadium: Weser-Stadion; Attendance: 39,870; Referee: Sascha Stegemann

14 December 2019 15	Bayern Munich	6–1	Werder Bremen	Munich
15:30 CET (UTC+1)	Pavard (yellow card) 16'; Boateng (yellow card) 18'; Coutinho 45', 63', 78'; Lewandowski 45+4', 72'; Müller 75'	Report	Groß (yellow card) 22'; Rashica 24'; Friedl (yellow card) 62'	Stadium: Allianz Arena; Attendance: 75,000; Referee: Robert Schröder

17 December 2019 16	Werder Bremen	0–5	Mainz 05	Bremen
18:30 CET (UTC+1)	Eggestein (yellow card) 77'; Bittencourt (yellow card) 79'	Report	Quaison 10', 19', 38'; Pavlenka 15' (o.g.); Fernandes (yellow card) 18'; Baku (yellow card) 79'; Mateta 81'	Stadium: Weser-Stadion; Attendance: 37,720; Referee: Frank Willenborg

21 December 2019 17	1. FC Köln	1–0	Werder Bremen	Cologne
15:30 CET (UTC+1)	Córdoba 39', (yellow card) 64'	Report	Eggestein (yellow card) 45'; Veljković (yellow card) 69'; Moisander (yellow card) 85'; Friedl (yellow card) 89'	Stadium: RheinEnergieStadion; Attendance: 50,000; Referee: Daniel Schlager

18 January 2020 18	Fortuna Düsseldorf	0–1	Werder Bremen	Düsseldorf
15:30 CET (UTC+1)	Fink (yellow card) 66'; Stöger (yellow card) 72'; Hoffmann (yellow card) 90+3'; Bodzek (yellow card) 90+5'	Report	Şahin (yellow card) 29'; Eggestein (yellow card) 60'; Kastenmeier 67' (o.g.); Friedl (yellow card) 72'; Moisander (yellow card) 72' (yellow-red card) 90+5'	Stadium: Merkur Spiel-Arena; Attendance: 46,000; Referee: Felix Brych

26 January 2020 19	Werder Bremen	0–3	1899 Hoffenheim	Bremen
15:30 CET (UTC+1)	Klaassen (yellow card) 34'; Friedl (yellow card) 60'	Report	Posch (yellow card) 22'; Kramarić (yellow card) 38'; Klaassen 65' (o.g.); Baumgartner 79'; Adamyan 83'	Stadium: Weser-Stadion; Attendance: 40,000; Referee: Martin Petersen

1 February 2020 20	FC Augsburg	2–1	Werder Bremen	Augsburg
15:30 CET (UTC+1)	Niederlechner 67'; Baier (yellow card) 76'; Vargas 82'; Max (yellow card) 88'	Report	Jedvaj 23' (o.g.); Eggestein (yellow card) 48'; Toprak (yellow card) 66'; Bartels (yellow card) 69'; Bittencourt (yellow card) 74'; Selke (yellow card) 90'	Stadium: WWK Arena; Attendance: 29,432; Referee: Marco Fritz

8 February 2020 21	Werder Bremen	0–2	Union Berlin	Bremen
15:30 CET (UTC+1)	Selke (yellow card) 16'; Toprak (yellow card) 30'; Vogt (yellow card) 30'; Friedl (yellow card) 80'	Report	Bülter 52', 72'; Trimmel (yellow card) 67'; Prömel (yellow card) 80'; Andersson (yellow card) 86'	Stadium: Weser-Stadion; Attendance: 42,100; Referee: Daniel Schlager

15 February 2020 22	RB Leipzig	3–0	Werder Bremen	Leipzig
15:30 CET (UTC+1)	Klostermann 18'; Schick 39'; Mukiele 46'; Upamecano (yellow card) 83'	Report	Eggestein (yellow card) 16'	Stadium: Red Bull Arena; Attendance: 41,308; Referee: Benjamin Cortus

22 February 2020 23	Werder Bremen	0–2	Borussia Dortmund	Bremen
15:30 CET (UTC+1)		Report	Zagadou 52'; Haaland 66'	Stadium: Weser-Stadion; Attendance: 42,100; Referee: Marco Fritz

7 March 2020 25	Hertha BSC	2–2	Werder Bremen	Berlin
15:30 CET (UTC+1)	Stark 41', (yellow card) 82'; Darida (yellow card) 59'; Cunha 60'; Klünter (yellow card) 62'	Report	Sargent 3', (yellow card) 71'; Klaassen 6', (yellow card) 82'; Vogt (yellow card) 76'	Stadium: Olympiastadion; Attendance: 58,028; Referee: Guido Winkmann

18 May 2020 26	Werder Bremen	1–4	Bayer Leverkusen	Bremen
20:30 CEST (UTC+2)	Gebre Selassie 30'; Moisander (yellow card) 54'; Friedl (yellow card) 75'	Report	Havertz 28', 33'; S. Bender (yellow card) 44'; Weiser 61'; Demirbay 78'	Stadium: Weser-Stadion; Attendance: 0 Referee: Tobias Stieler
Note: The match was postponed on 13 March due to the pandemic of COVID-19 in Germany, and rescheduled to 18 May.

23 May 2020 27	SC Freiburg	0–1	Werder Bremen	Freiburg
15:30 CEST (UTC+2)		Report	Bittencourt 19'; Friedl (yellow card) 29'; Bargfrede (yellow card) 42' (yellow-red card) 88'	Stadium: Schwarzwald-Stadion; Attendance: 0 Referee: Robert Hartmann
Note: The match was postponed on 13 March due to the pandemic of COVID-19 in Germany, and rescheduled to 23 May.

26 May 2020 28	Werder Bremen	0–0	Borussia Mönchengladbach	Bremen
20:30 CEST (UTC+2)	Gebre Selassie (yellow card) 34'; Veljković (yellow card) 41'	Report	Jantschke (yellow card) 47'	Stadium: Weser-Stadion; Attendance: 0 Referee: Manuel Gräfe
Note: The match was postponed on 24 March due to the pandemic of COVID-19 in Germany, and rescheduled to 26 May.

30 May 2020 29	Schalke 04	0–1	Werder Bremen	Gelsenkirchen
15:30 CEST (UTC+2)	Gregoritsch (yellow card) 3'; Todibo (yellow card) 26'; McKennie (yellow card) 44'; Boujellab (yellow card) 83'; Kabak (yellow card) 90+3'	Report	Langkamp (yellow card) 20'; Bittencourt 32'; Osako (yellow card) 63'; Selke (yellow card) 90+3'	Stadium: Veltins-Arena; Attendance: 0 Referee: Felix Zwayer
Note: The match was postponed on 24 March due to the pandemic of COVID-19 in Germany, and rescheduled to 30 May.

3 June 2020 24	Werder Bremen	0–3	Eintracht Frankfurt	Bremen
20:30 CEST (UTC+2)	Bartels (yellow card) 3'; Veljković (yellow card) 87'	Report	Hinteregger (yellow card) 14'; Silva 61'; Ilsanker 81', 90'	Stadium: Weser-Stadion; Attendance: 0 Referee: Patrick Ittrich
Note: The match was postponed due to the postponement of Frankfurt's UEFA Europa League match. It was then rescheduled to 3 June due to the pandemic of COVID-19 in Germany.

7 June 2020 30	Werder Bremen	0–1	VfL Wolfsburg	Bremen
13:30 CEST (UTC+2)	Klaassen (yellow card) 45'; Sargent (yellow card) 49'; Bittencourt (yellow card) 80'	Report	Schlager (yellow card) 54'; Pongračić (yellow card) 58'; Mbabu (yellow card) 67'; Weghorst 82'	Stadium: Weser-Stadion; Attendance: 0 Referee: Bibiana Steinhaus
Note: The match was postponed on 24 March due to the pandemic of COVID-19 in Germany, and rescheduled to 7 June.

13 June 2020 31	SC Paderborn	1–5	Werder Bremen	Paderborn
15:30 CEST (UTC+2)	Gjasula (yellow card) 32'; Jans (yellow card) 39'; Michel (yellow card) 63'; Sabiri 66', (yellow card) 82'; Zolinski (yellow card) 78'; Ritter (yellow card) 80'	Report	Augustinsson (yellow card) 15'; Klaassen 20', 39', (yellow card) 63'; Osako 34'; Eggestein 60'; Füllkrug (yellow card) 80', (goal) 90+2'	Stadium: Benteler-Arena; Attendance: 0 Referee: Christian Dingert
Note: The match was postponed on 24 March due to the pandemic of COVID-19 in Germany, and rescheduled to 13 June.

16 June 2020 32	Werder Bremen	0–1	Bayern Munich	Bremen
20:30 CEST (UTC+2)	Eggestein (yellow card) 56'; Langkamp (yellow card) 88'	Report	Davies (yellow card) 19' (yellow-red card) 79'; Lewandowski 43'; Kimmich (yellow card) 89'	Stadium: Weser-Stadion; Attendance: 0 Referee: Harm Osmers
Note: The match was postponed on 24 March due to the pandemic of COVID-19 in Germany, and rescheduled to 16 June.

20 June 2020 33	Mainz 05	3–1	Werder Bremen	Mainz
15:30 CEST (UTC+2)	Quaison 25', (yellow card) 40'; Boëtius 30', (yellow card) 57'; Fernandes 85'	Report	Veljković (yellow card) 22'; Friedl (yellow card) 35'; Osako 58'; Augustinsson (yellow card) 63'	Stadium: Opel Arena; Attendance: 0 Referee: Manuel Gräfe
Note: The match was postponed on 24 March due to the pandemic of COVID-19 in Germany, and rescheduled to 20 June.

27 June 2020 34	Werder Bremen	6–1	1. FC Köln	Bremen
15:30 CEST (UTC+2)	Osako 22', 58'; Rashica 27'; Füllkrug 29'; Vogt (yellow card) 49'; Klaassen 55'; Sargent 68'	Report	Uth (yellow card) 29'; Ehizibue (yellow card) 57'; Drexler 62'	Stadium: Weser-Stadion; Attendance: 0 Referee: Bastian Dankert
Note: The match was postponed on 7 May due to the pandemic of COVID-19 in Germany, and rescheduled to 27 June.

==== Relegation play-offs ====
As a result of their 16th-place finish in the regular season, the club qualified for the play-off match with the third-place team in the 2019–20 2. Bundesliga to determine whether the club would remain in the 2020–21 Bundesliga.

2 July 2020 First leg	Werder Bremen	0–0	1. FC Heidenheim	Bremen
20:30 CEST (UTC+2)	Moisander (yellow card) 17' (yellow-red card) 87'; Osako (yellow card) 34'; Bittencourt (yellow card) 71'	Report	Multhaup (yellow card) 35'; Beermann (yellow card) 75'	Stadium: Weser-Stadion; Attendance: 0 Referee: Felix Zwayer

6 July 2020 Second leg	1. FC Heidenheim	2–2 (2–2 (a) agg.)	Werder Bremen	Heidenheim
20:30 CEST (UTC+2)	Dorsch (yellow card) 60'; Multhaup (yellow card) 81'; Kleindienst 85', 90+7' (pen.)	Report	Theuerkauf 3' (o.g.); Augustinsson (yellow card) 90+2', (goal) 90+4'; Klaassen (yellow card) 90+2'	Stadium: Voith-Arena; Attendance: 0 Referee: Felix Brych

=== DFB-Pokal ===
10 August 2019 First round	Atlas Delmenhorst	1–6	Werder Bremen	Bremen
20:45 CEST (UTC+2)	Schmidt 30', (yellow card) 76'; Stütz (yellow card) 45'	Report	Osako 10'; Moisander 19'; Rashica 37'; Klaassen 40'; Friedl (yellow card) 43'; Pizarro 68', 74'	Stadium: Weser-Stadion; Attendance: 41,500; Referee: Patrick Ittrich

30 October 2019 Second round	Werder Bremen	4–1	1. FC Heidenheim	Bremen
18:30 CET (UTC+1)	Rashica 6'; Bittencourt 11'; Klaassen 18'; Friedl 40', (yellow card) 45'; Philipp Bargfrede (yellow card) 58'; Osako (yellow card) 82'	Report	Schnatterer 45+1' (pen.)	Stadium: Weser-Stadion; Attendance: 40,000; Referee: Daniel Schlager

4 February 2020 Round of 16	Werder Bremen	3–2	Borussia Dortmund	Bremen
20:45 CET (UTC+1)	Selke 16'; Bittencourt (yellow card) 23', (goal) 30'; Rashica 70'; Moisander (yellow card) 85'	Report	Schulz (yellow card) 49'; Reus (yellow card) 64'; Haaland 67'; Reyna 78', (yellow card) 85'	Stadium: Weser-Stadion; Attendance: 42,100; Referee: Guido Winkmann

4 March 2020 Quarter-finals	Eintracht Frankfurt	2–0	Werder Bremen	Frankfurt
20:45 CET (UTC+1)	Abraham (yellow card) 34'; Silva 45+6' (pen.); Kamada 60'; Hinteregger (yellow card) 80'; Kostić (red card) 90+1'	Report	Bittencourt (yellow card) 45+6'; Selke (yellow card) 80'	Stadium: Waldstadion; Attendance: 51,500; Referee: Felix Zwayer

== Statistics ==
=== Appearances and goals ===
No.	Pos	Nat	Player	Total		Bundesliga		DFB-Pokal		Relegation play-offs	
No.	Pos	Nat	Player	Apps	Goals	Apps	Goals	Apps	Goals	Apps	Goals
Goalkeepers
1	GK	(Czech Republic) CZE	Jiří Pavlenka	39	0	33	0	4	0	2	0
27	GK	(Greece) GRE	Stefanos Kapino	1	0	1	0	0	0	0	0
40	GK	(Germany) GER	Luca Plogmann	0	0	0	0	0	0	0	0
Defenders
3	DF	(Germany) GER	Kevin Vogt	17	0	14	0	2	0	1	0
4	DF	(Switzerland) SUI	Michael Lang	10	0	6+3	0	1	0	0	0
5	DF	(Sweden) SWE	Ludwig Augustinsson	15	1	10+2	0	1	0	1+1	1
13	DF	(Serbia) SRB	Miloš Veljković	28	0	23+1	0	2	0	2	0
15	DF	(Germany) GER	Sebastian Langkamp	7	0	3+2	0	1	0	0+1	0
18	DF	(Finland) FIN	Niklas Moisander	26	1	22	0	3	1	1	0
21	DF	(Turkey) TUR	Ömer Toprak	12	0	9+1	0	1+1	0	0	0
23	DF	(Czech Republic) CZE	Theodor Gebre Selassie	32	2	28	2	2	0	2	0
32	DF	(Austria) AUT	Marco Friedl	32	2	24+3	1	3	1	2	0
36	DF	(Germany) GER	Christian Groß	17	0	10+4	0	1	0	0+2	0
Midfielders
6	MF	(Germany) GER	Kevin Möhwald	2	0	0+1	0	0+1	0	0	0
7	MF	(Kosovo) KOS	Milot Rashica	34	11	27+1	8	4	3	2	0
10	MF	(Germany) GER	Leonardo Bittencourt	32	6	23+5	4	3	2	0+1	0
17	MF	(Turkey) TUR	Nuri Şahin	17	0	16	0	1	0	0	0
22	MF	(Germany) GER	Fin Bartels	17	0	1+13	0	0+1	0	0+2	0
26	MF	(Italy) ITA	Simon Straudi	0	0	0	0	0	0	0	0
28	MF	(Bulgaria) BUL	Ilia Gruev	0	0	0	0	0	0	0	0
30	MF	(Netherlands) NED	Davy Klaassen	39	9	33	7	4	2	2	0
31	MF	(Germany) GER	David Philipp	0	0	0	0	0	0	0	0
35	MF	(Germany) GER	Maximilian Eggestein	38	1	32	1	4	0	2	0
39	MF	(Germany) GER	Benjamin Goller	11	0	2+8	0	0+1	0	0	0
44	MF	(Germany) GER	Philipp Bargfrede	17	0	6+9	0	1	0	1	0
Forwards
8	FW	(Japan) JPN	Yuya Osako	34	9	22+6	8	2+2	1	2	0
9	FW	(Germany) GER	Davie Selke	13	1	5+6	0	2	1	0	0
11	FW	(Germany) GER	Niclas Füllkrug	11	4	4+4	4	0+1	0	1+1	0
14	FW	(Peru) PER	Claudio Pizarro	19	2	0+18	0	0+1	2	0	0
19	FW	(United States) USA	Josh Sargent	34	4	15+13	4	2+2	0	1+1	0
24	FW	(Germany) GER	Johannes Eggestein	15	1	4+10	1	0+1	0	0	0
29	FW	(Germany) GER	Luc Ihorst	1	0	0+1	0	0	0	0	0
41	FW	(Germany) GER	Nick Woltemade	6	0	1+4	0	0+1	0	0	0
Players transferred out during the season
2	DF	(Sweden) SWE	Felix Beijmo	0	0	0	0	0	0	0	0
9	FW	(Austria) AUT	Martin Harnik	2	0	0+2	0	0	0	0	0

Last updated: 6 July 2020
Source: Soccerway
