= David Yelldell =

American footballer (born 1981)

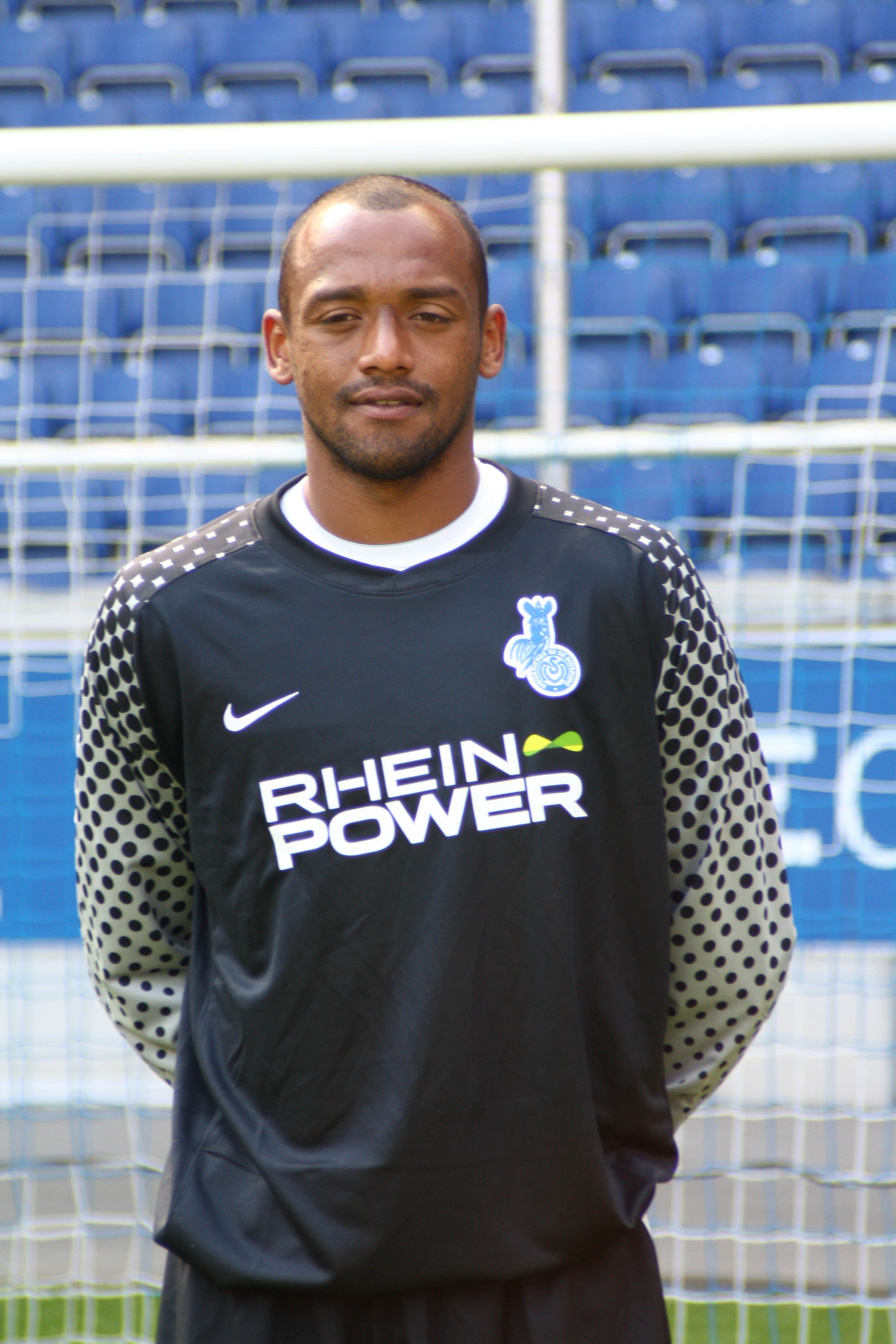
- Yelldell with Duisburg in 2011

Personal information
- Date of birth: October 1, 1981 (age 45)
- Place of birth: Stuttgart, West Germany
- Height: 1.94 m (6 ft 4 in)
- Position: Goalkeeper

Team information
- Current team: Sonnenhof Großaspach (assistant coach)

Youth career
- 1999–2001: VfL Waiblingen
- 2001–2002: SG Backnang

Senior career*
Years	Team	Apps	(Gls)
2002–2003	Stuttgarter Kickers II	24	(0)
2003–2005	Blackburn Rovers	0	(0)
2005	→ Brighton & Hove Albion (loan)	3	(0)
2005–2008	Stuttgarter Kickers	100	(0)
2008–2010	TuS Koblenz	51	(0)
2010–2011	MSV Duisburg	34	(0)
2011–2016	Bayer Leverkusen	1	(0)
2012–2016	Bayer Leverkusen II	8	(0)
2016–2017	Sonnenhof Großaspach	6	(0)
Total		227	(0)

International career
2011	United States	1	(0)

Managerial career
- 2017–: Sonnenhof Großaspach (goalkeeping coach)
- * Club domestic league appearances and goals

David Yelldell (born October 1, 1981) is an American former professional soccer player who played as a goalkeeper and serves as an assistant coach for Sonnenhof Großaspach. Born in Stuttgart, Germany, he was capped for the United States national team.

== Club career ==
Yelldell was the first choice goalkeeper for TuS Koblenz until suffering a knee ligament injury which kept him out of the final four matches of the 2009–10 2. Bundesliga season, when the club were relegated to the 3. Liga.

He signed with MSV Duisburg before the 2010–11 season and made his competitive debut for the club in a first round DFB-Pokal match against VfB Lübeck on August 13, 2010.

The next season saw him signing with Bundesliga giants Bayer Leverkusen. He made his debut and sole competitive appearance for the club in a first round DFB-Pokal match, a 4–3 surprise defeat at Dynamo Dresden on July 30, 2011.

== International career ==
Born to a German mother and an African American father who was in the U.S. military, Yelldell holds dual citizenship and would have been eligible to play international soccer for either the United States or Germany. He was first called up by the US team in 2011 for a friendly against Argentina. He earned his first national team cap three days later, on March 29, 2011, in another friendly against Paraguay, replacing Marcus Hahnemann at half time. Despite not conceding during his time of play, the US lost this meeting 1–0.

== Career statistics ==
Appearances and goals by club, season and competition
Club	Season	League			Cup		League Cup		Europe		Total	
Club	Season	Division	Apps	Goals	Apps	Goals	Apps	Goals	Apps	Goals	Apps	Goals
Blackburn Rovers	2003–04	Premier League	0	0	0	0	0	0	0	0	0	0
Blackburn Rovers	2004–05	Premier League	0	0	0	0	0	0	—		0	0
Blackburn Rovers	Total		0	0	0	0	0	0	0	0	0	0
Brighton & Hove Albion	2004–05	Championship	3	0	—		—		—		3	0
Stuttgarter Kickers	2005–06	Regionalliga Süd	32	0	1	0	—		—		33	0
Stuttgarter Kickers	2006–07	Regionalliga Süd	34	0	2	0	—		—		36	0
Stuttgarter Kickers	2007–08	Regionalliga Süd	34	0	0	0	—		—		34	0
Stuttgarter Kickers	Total		100	0	3	0	—		—		103	0
TuS Koblenz	2008–09	2. Bundesliga	30	0	1	0	—		—		31	0
TuS Koblenz	2009–10	2. Bundesliga	21	0	3	0	—		—		24	0
TuS Koblenz	Total		51	0	4	0	—		—		55	0
MSV Duisburg	2010–11	2. Bundesliga	34	0	6	0	—		—		40	0
Bayer Leverkusen	2011–12	Bundesliga	0	0	1	0	—		0	0	1	0
Bayer Leverkusen	2012–13	Bundesliga	0	0	0	0	—		0	0	0	0
Bayer Leverkusen	2013–14	Bundesliga	0	0	0	0	—		0	0	0	0
Bayer Leverkusen	2014–15	Bundesliga	0	0	0	0	—		0	0	0	0
Bayer Leverkusen	2015–16	Bundesliga	1	0	0	0	—		0	0	1	0
Bayer Leverkusen	Total		1	0	1	0	—		0	0	2	0
Bayer Leverkusen II	2012–13	Regionalliga West	2	0	—		—		—		2	0
Bayer Leverkusen II	2013–14	Regionalliga West	6	0	—		—		—		6	0
Bayer Leverkusen II	Total		8	0	—		—		—		8	0
Sonnenhof Großaspach	2016–17	3. Liga	6	0	0	0	—		—		6	0
Career total			203	0	14	0	0	0	0	0	217	0
