= 2023–24 FC Dordrecht season =

FC Dordrecht
2023–24 season
- Manager: Michele Santoni
- Stadium: Stadion Krommedijk
- Eerste Divisie: 4th
- KNVB Cup: Second round
- Top goalscorer: League: Mathis Suray (13); All: Mathis Suray (14)
Home colours

The 2023–24 season was FC Dordrecht's 141st season in existence and eighth consecutive in the Eerste Divisie. They also competed in the KNVB Cup.

== Players ==
=== First-team squad ===
As of 1 September 2023

Note: Flags indicate national team as defined under FIFA eligibility rules; some limited exceptions apply. Players may hold more than one non-FIFA nationality.

No.	Pos.	Nation	Player
1	GK	GER	Luca Plogmann (on loan from Go Ahead Eagles)
2	DF	NED	Abdallah Aberkane
3	DF	NED	Jop van der Avert
4	DF	BEL	Antef Tsoungui (on loan from Feyenoord)
5	DF	USA	John Hilton
6	MF	NED	Tim Receveur
7	MF	FRA	Malhory Noc
8	MF	NED	Benjamin Reemst
9	FW	AUT	René Kriwak
10	MF	NED	Jari Schuurman
11	FW	FRA	Boubakar Camara
12	DF	NED	Guus Baars (on loan from Feyenoord)
13	GK	NED	Tijn Baltussen
14	DF	NED	Ilias Bronkhorst

No.	Pos.	Nation	Player
18	FW	NED	Jeffrey Owusu
20	FW	BEL	Mathis Suray
21	MF	EST	Rocco Robert Shein
22	FW	NED	Shiloh 't Zand (on loan from Feyenoord)
24	MF	POL	Bartłomiej Smolarczyk
26	MF	NED	Daniel van Vianen
28	DF	CPV	Elso Brito
29	FW	NED	Joey de Bie
31	GK	CUW	Trevor Doornbusch
40	MF	MAR	Ilias Sebaoui (on loan from Feyenoord)
—	DF	NED	Elgero King
—	DF	NED	Ruben Kluivert
—	FW	NED	Tyrell Tear
—	FW	AUS	Adrian Segecic (on loan from Sydney FC)

=== Out on loan ===
Note: Flags indicate national team as defined under FIFA eligibility rules; some limited exceptions apply. Players may hold more than one non-FIFA nationality.

No.	Pos.	Nation	Player
—	FW	NED	Pepijn Doesburg (at VVV-Venlo until 30 June 2024)

== Transfers ==
=== In ===
Pos.	Player	Transferred from	Fee	Date	Source

=== Out ===
Pos.	Player	Transferred to	Fee	Date	Source

== Pre-season and friendlies ==
Win Draw Loss Fixtures

7 July 2023 Friendly	Dordrecht (Netherlands)	3–1	(Netherlands) Helmond Sport
19:00 CEST (UTC+2)

11 July 2023 Friendly	Lommel (Belgium)	3–2	(Netherlands) Dordrecht
17:00 CEST (UTC+2)

16 July 2023 Friendly	Dordrecht (Netherlands)	5–0	(Ukraine) Shakhtar Donetsk U21
19:00 CEST (UTC+2)		Report

21 July 2023 Friendly	Dordrecht (Netherlands)	2–0	(Netherlands) Den Bosch
19:00 CEST (UTC+2)

22 July 2023 Friendly	Dordrecht (Netherlands)	0–1	(United Arab Emirates) Al-Nasr
18:00 CEST (UTC+2)

28 July 2023 Friendly	Dordrecht (Netherlands)	4–3	(Turkey) Alanyaspor
19:00 CEST (UTC+2)

2 August 2023 Friendly	Deinze (Belgium)	1–1	(Netherlands) Dordrecht
19:00 CEST (UTC+2)	Mertens 79'		Pinas 11'

== Competitions ==
=== Overall record ===
Competition	First match	Last match	Starting round	Final position	Record							
Competition	First match	Last match	Starting round	Final position	Pld	W	D	L	GF	GA	GD	Win %
Eerste Divisie	11 August 2023	10 May 2024	Matchday 1	4th	38	18	15	5	73	50	+23	47.37
KNVB Cup	31 October 2023	19 December 2023	First round	Secon round	2	1	0	1	3	4	−1	50.00
Total					40	19	15	6	76	54	+22	47.50

Source: Soccerway

=== Eerste Divisie ===
==== League table ====
Pos	Team	Pld	W	D	L	GF	GA	GD	Pts	Promotion or qualification
2	Groningen (Note: Winner of the Third and Fourth Period (Rounds 20–29 and 30–38)) (P)	38	22	9	7	71	30	+41	75	Promotion to the Eredivisie
3	Roda JC Kerkrade (Note: Winner of the First Period (Rounds 1–9))	38	21	12	5	69	34	+35	75	Qualification for promotion play-offs
4	Dordrecht	38	18	15	5	74	51	+23	69	Qualification for promotion play-offs
5	ADO Den Haag	38	17	12	9	72	50	+22	63	Qualification for promotion play-offs
6	De Graafschap	38	19	6	13	61	52	+9	63	Qualification for promotion play-offs

Source: Flashscore, Keuken Kampioen Divisie (in Dutch)
Rules for classification: Season in progress: 1) Most points won; 2) Less points lost; 3) Goal difference; 4) Goals scored; 5) Alphabetical order; End of season: 1) Points; 2) Goal difference; 3) Goals scored; 4) Head-to-head points; 5) Head-to-head goal difference; 6) Head-to-head away goals scored; 7) Play-off if relevant for deciding champion, relegation or participating in a European league, otherwise by draw. 8) Penalty shoot-out (only after a play-off)
(P) Promoted

==== Results summary ====
Overall								Home						Away					
Pld	W	D	L	GF	GA	GD	Pts	W	D	L	GF	GA	GD	W	D	L	GF	GA	GD
7	2	4	1	12	11	+1	10	0	4	0	7	7	0	2	0	1	5	4	+1

Last updated: 22 September 2023.

==== Results by round ====
Round	1	2	3	4	5	6	7
Ground	H	A	H	A	A	H	H
Result	D	L	D	W	W	D	D
Position	7	17	18	13	8	9	

Updated to match(es) played on 22 September 2023. Source:
A = Away; H = Home; W = Win; D = Draw; L = Loss

==== Matches ====
The league fixtures were unveiled on 30 June 2023.

11 August 2023 1	Dordrecht	2–2	NAC Breda	Dordrecht
20:00 CEST (UTC+2)	Hilton 44'; Tsoungui 70'	Report	Janošek 75' (pen.); Sejdiu 90+5'	Stadium: Stadion Krommedijk; Referee: Laurens Gerrets

18 August 2023 2	Willem II	2–0	Dordrecht	Tilburg
20:00 CEST (UTC+2)	De Leeuw 32'; Svensson 49'	Report		Stadium: Koning Willem II Stadion; Referee: Robin Hensgens

25 August 2023 3	Dordrecht	2–2	MVV Maastricht	Dordrecht
20:00 CEST (UTC+2)	Suray 69' (pen.), 70'	Report	Smets 12'; Kostons 85'	Stadium: Stadion Krommedijk; Referee: Joey Kooij

1 September 2023 4	Emmen	2–4	Dordrecht	Emmen
20:00 CEST (UTC+2)		Report		Stadium: De Oude Meerdijk; Referee: Robin Vereijken

15 September 2023 6	Dordrecht	3–3	Jong Utrecht	Dordrecht
20:00 CEST (UTC+2)		Report		Stadium: Stadion Krommedijk; Referee: Kevin Puts

18 September 2023 5	TOP Oss	0–1	Dordrecht	Oss
20:00 CEST (UTC+2)		Report	Sebaoui 39'	Stadium: Frans Heesen Stadion; Referee: Martin Perez

22 September 2023 7	Dordrecht	0–0	Jong AZ	Dordrecht
20:00 CEST (UTC+2)	Segecic (yellow card) 79'	Report	Engel (yellow card) 59'; Daal (yellow card) 89'	Stadium: Stadion Krommedijk; Referee: Thomas Hardeman

6 October 2023 9	Dordrecht	5–2	Cambuur	Dordrecht
				Stadium: Stadion Krommedijk

20 October 2023 11	Dordrecht	4–0	Jong Ajax	Dordrecht
				Stadium: Stadion Krommedijk

27 October 2023 12	Dordrecht	5–1	Den Bosch	Dordrecht
				Stadium: Stadion Krommedijk

10 November 2023 14	Dordrecht	1–4	Jong PSV	Dordrecht
				Stadium: Stadion Krommedijk

24 November 2023 16	Dordrecht	2–2	ADO Den Haag	Dordrecht
				Stadium: Stadion Krommedijk

1 December 2023 17	Dordrecht	2–0	Roda JC	Dordrecht
				Stadium: Stadion Krommedijk

23 December 2023 20	Dordrecht	2–1	Emmen	Dordrecht
				Stadium: Stadion Krommedijk

12 January 2024 21	Dordrecht	2–0	Helmond Sport	Dordrecht
				Stadium: Stadion Krommedijk

2 February 2024 24	Dordrecht	1–0	Groningen	Dordrecht
				Stadium: Stadion Krommedijk

16 February 2024 26	Dordrecht	1–0	VVV-Venlo	Dordrecht
				Stadium: Stadion Krommedijk

8 March 2024 29	Dordrecht	2–0	Telstar	Dordrecht
				Stadium: Stadion Krommedijk

15 March 2024 30	Dordrecht	0–0	Eindhoven	Dordrecht
				Stadium: Stadion Krommedijk

5 April 2024 33	Dordrecht	2–1	De Graafschap	Dordrecht
				Stadium: Stadion Krommedijk

19 April 2024 35	Dordrecht	3–1	TOP Oss	Dordrecht
				Stadium: Stadion Krommedijk

3 May 2024 37	Dordrecht	1–1	Willem II	Dordrecht
				Stadium: Stadion Krommedijk

=== KNVB Cup ===
31 October 2023 First round	FC Lisse	1–3	Dordrecht
--:-- CET (UTC+1)

19 December 2023 Second round	Dordrecht	0–3	SC Cambuur
--:-- CET (UTC+1)
