= André Schürrle =

German footballer (born 1990)

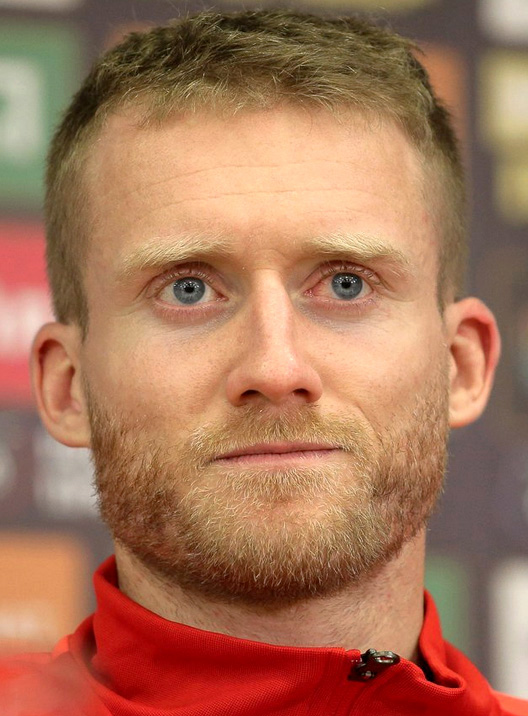
- Schürrle in 2019

Personal information
- Full name: André Horst Schürrle
- Date of birth: 6 November 1990 (age 36)
- Place of birth: Ludwigshafen, Germany
- Height: 1.84 m (6 ft 0 in)
- Positions: Winger; forward

Youth career
- 1996–2006: Ludwigshafener SC
- 2006–2009: Mainz 05

Senior career*
Years	Team	Apps	(Gls)
2009–2011	Mainz 05	66	(20)
2011–2013	Bayer Leverkusen	65	(18)
2013–2015	Chelsea	44	(11)
2015–2016	VfL Wolfsburg	43	(10)
2016–2020	Borussia Dortmund	33	(3)
2018–2019	→ Fulham (loan)	24	(6)
2019–2020	→ Spartak Moscow (loan)	13	(1)
Total		288	(69)

International career
2008–2009	Germany U19	11	(4)
2009	Germany U20	1	(1)
2009–2010	Germany U21	4	(3)
2010–2017	Germany	57	(22)
Medal record
Men's football
Representing Germany
FIFA World Cup
Winner	2014 Brazil	Team
UEFA European Championship
Bronze medal – third place	2012 Poland–Ukraine	Team
- * Club domestic league appearances and goals

André Horst Schürrle (German pronunciation: [anˈdʁeː ˈʃʏʁlə, ˈandʁeː -]; born 6 November 1990) is a German former professional footballer who played as a winger or forward.

He began his career at Mainz 05 in 2009, spending two years at the club before a £6.5 million transfer to Bayer 04 Leverkusen. His performances there gained the attention of Chelsea, who signed him for a reported £18 million in 2013. Schürrle played one-and-a-half Premier League seasons at the English club before joining VfL Wolfsburg for £22 million in January 2015, winning the DFB-Pokal and DFL-Supercup in his first year. He then joined Borussia Dortmund in July 2016. His time there included loan spells at Fulham and Spartak Moscow. After leaving Dortmund, he retired from professional football in July 2020, at the age of 29.

Schürrle was a full international for Germany from 2010 to 2017, gaining 57 caps and scoring 22 goals. He was a member of the German squads which reached the semi-finals at Euro 2012 and won the 2014 World Cup. During extra-time in the final he provided the assist for Mario Götze's winning goal against Argentina.

== Club career ==
=== Early career ===
Schürrle started his career at local club Ludwigshafener SC at age four, before joining 1. FSV Mainz 05 in 2006. He played as a defender before switching to his current position of an attacker. He spent three years playing for the club's youth teams, where he won the Under 19 Bundesliga in 2009 under coach Thomas Tuchel.

=== 1. FSV Mainz 05 ===
In August 2009, Schürrle made his Bundesliga debut in a 2–2 draw against Bayer Leverkusen on the opening day of the 2009–10 season. The following month, on 19 September 2009, Schürrle scored his first two league goals in a 3–2 away win against VfL Bochum before signing a professional contract with the club later in the week.

In September 2010, Mainz announced that Schürrle had signed a five-year contract with Bayer Leverkusen, and would join the club at the end of the 2010–11 season. The transfer fee agreed between the two clubs was believed to be in the region of €8 million.

=== Bayer Leverkusen ===
Schürrle completed his £6.5 million move to Bayer Leverkusen in 2011, signing a five-year contract with the club until the summer of 2016. He scored on his debut in a DFB Pokal tie against Dynamo Dresden. He had to wait until 15 October 2011 to open his Bundesliga account for Bayer Leverkusen, when he netted a late equalizer against Borussia Mönchengladbach, rescuing his side a point as the match finished 2–2. Schürrle registered his first European goal in the Champions League in a home win over Valencia four days later.

On 26 September, Schürrle scored his first goal of the season against FC Augsburg in a 3–1 win. In the fixture against Bayern Munich on 28 October 2012, Schürrle provided an assist for Stefan Kießling in a 2–1 win at the Allianz Arena. This gave Bayern their first loss of the season in the Bundesliga and gave Bayer Leverkusen their first victory in Munich since October 1989. On 30 March 2013, Schürrle scored twice in the match against Fortuna Düsseldorf, in a 4–1 win. On 20 April 2013, Schürrle scored a brace and made an assist as they defeated 1899 Hoffenheim 5–0 at home. Schürrle finished the 2012–13 campaign with a tally of 14 goals and 9 assists in 43 games across all competitions.

=== Chelsea ===
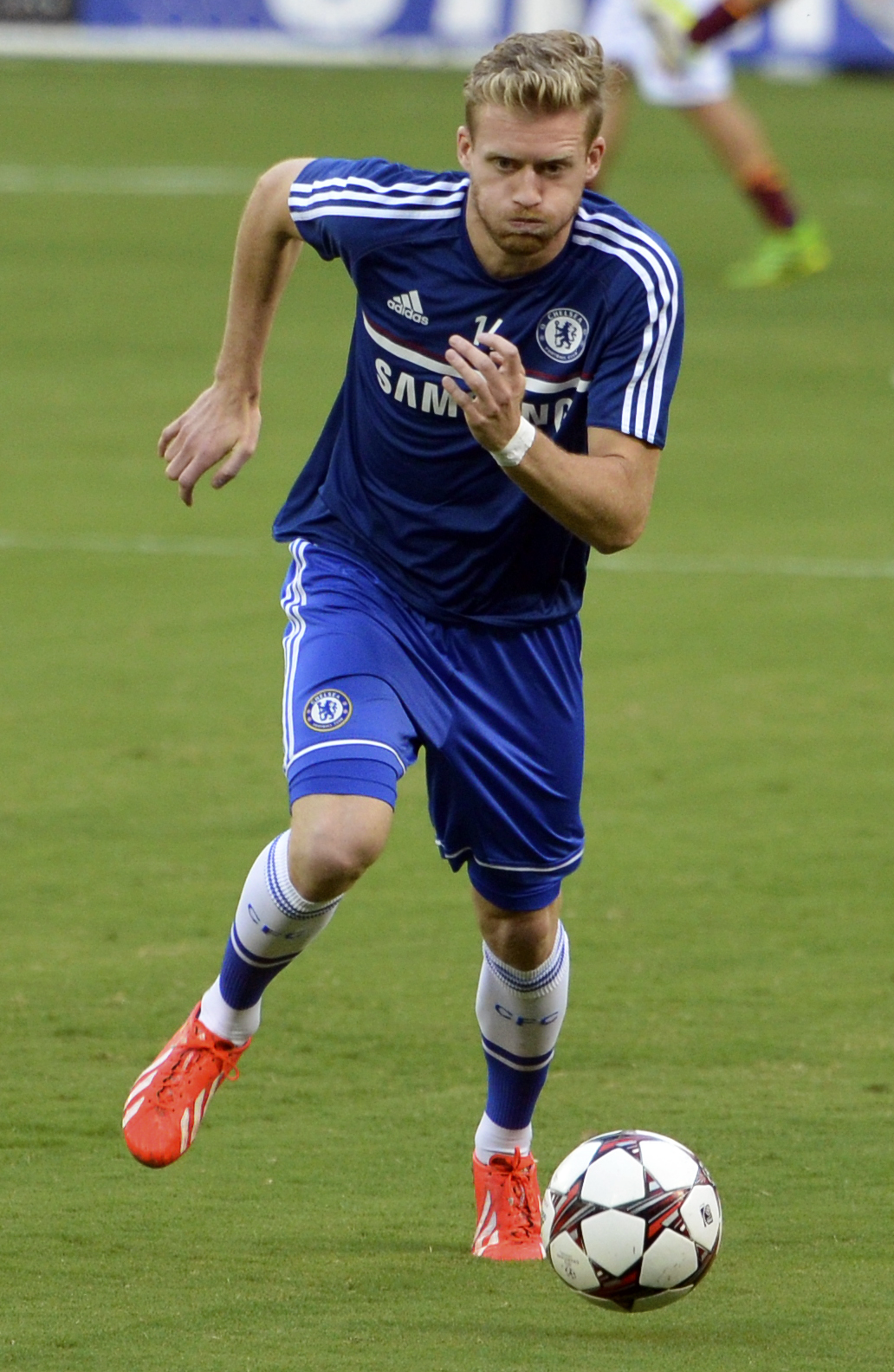
Schürrle playing for Chelsea in 2013

On 18 April 2013, it was confirmed that Bayer Leverkusen's director of sport Rudi Völler had travelled to London to hold talks with Chelsea over the transfer of Schürrle, although no fee had yet been agreed. On 13 June 2013, Chelsea confirmed via their official website that they had reached an agreement with Leverkusen for the transfer of Schürrle, with the transfer fee reported to be in the region of €21 million (£18 million). On 25 June 2013, Chelsea announced that they had completed the transfer of Schürrle, bringing an end to the Londoners' protracted pursuit of the German forward. With Schürrle signing a five-year contract, he was given the number 14 shirt. On 4 August, Schürrle scored his first goal in a Chelsea shirt in a pre-season friendly match against Milan during a tour of the United States.

On 18 August, Schürrle made his competitive debut for Chelsea, coming on as a 67th-minute substitute for Kevin De Bruyne in a Premier League 2–0 win over Hull City at Stamford Bridge. His first goal for Chelsea came in the 2–1 home victory over title challengers Manchester City on 27 October, where he scored from a cross by teammate Fernando Torres. On 7 December, he then scored two goals against Stoke City in a 3–2 defeat.

Schürrle scored his first Premier League hat-trick the following 1 March, against Fulham in a 3–1 away victory in the West London derby. Three weeks later, he assisted Samuel Eto'o's goal in the fifth minute and sent Chelsea into a 2–0 lead in the seventh minute at home to Arsenal; he was awarded Man of the match after Chelsea won 6–0. On 8 April, he scored in Chelsea's second leg UEFA Champions League match against Paris Saint-Germain, to advance to the semi-finals on the away-goals rule. His first season in England ended with eight goals in 30 Premier League matches.

On 18 August 2014, in Chelsea's first game of the new league season, Schürrle scored the second goal of a 3–1 victory away to Burnley, from a Cesc Fàbregas pass. This was later voted Match of the Day's goal of the month. Chelsea finished the season as Premier League champions and Schürrle, despite going on to complete a transfer to Wolfsburg in early 2015, received a medal, having played 14 matches in the league season. He was not aware that he had played enough matches to earn a medal, and was surprised when manager José Mourinho texted him to tell him of the recognition.

=== Wolfsburg ===
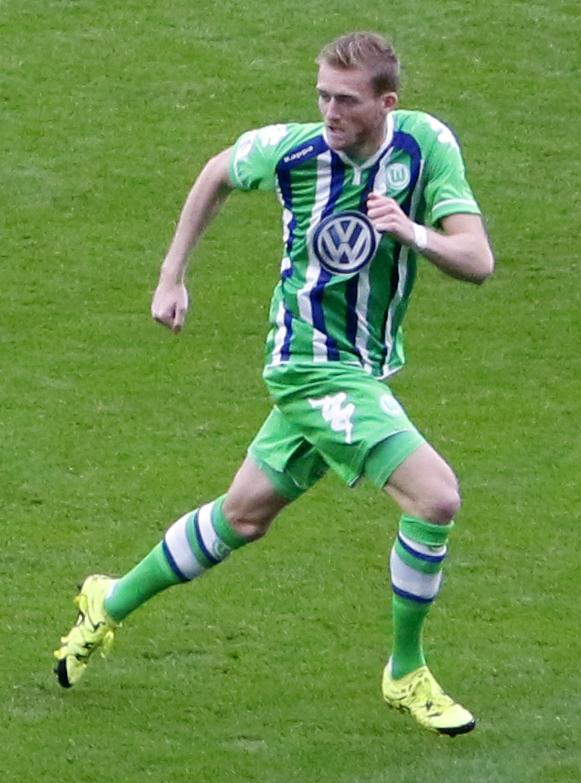
Schürrle playing for Wolfsburg in 2015

You have to make a decision, and in the end I only wanted to play football again. Germany manager Joachim Löw told me it would be a great move for me and that is why Wolfsburg are a step forward for me. Wolfsburg have a great team as well and can play for silverware in the Bundesliga and in Europe.

— Schürrle, on his transfer to Wolfsburg, in 2015.

On 2 February 2015, Schürrle returned to the Bundesliga, joining Wolfsburg for a fee of £22 million. Five days later he made his debut for the club, playing the entirety of a 3–0 home win over Hoffenheim and setting up goals for Bas Dost and Kevin De Bruyne. His first goal for the club came on 4 April, in a 3–1 win over VfB Stuttgart. On 30 May, Wolfsburg won the DFB-Pokal for the first time after beating Borussia Dortmund 3–1 in the final at the Olympiastadion in Berlin, Schürrle playing the final nine minutes in place of Maximilian Arnold.

Schürrle was a 63rd-minute substitute for Daniel Caligiuri as Wolfsburg won the 2015 DFL-Supercup on 1 August, scoring in the penalty shootout. On 25 November, after again replacing Caligiuri in the 61st minute, he scored both goals in a Champions League group stage win at CSKA Moscow.

On 1 March 2016, exactly two years after scoring his first club hat-trick for Chelsea, Schürrle recorded his first treble for Wolfsburg in their 4–0 win against Hannover 96. A week later he scored the only goal in a 1–0 (4–2 aggregate) win over Belgian side Gent to advance his team to the UEFA Champions League quarter-finals for the first time in their history.

=== Borussia Dortmund ===
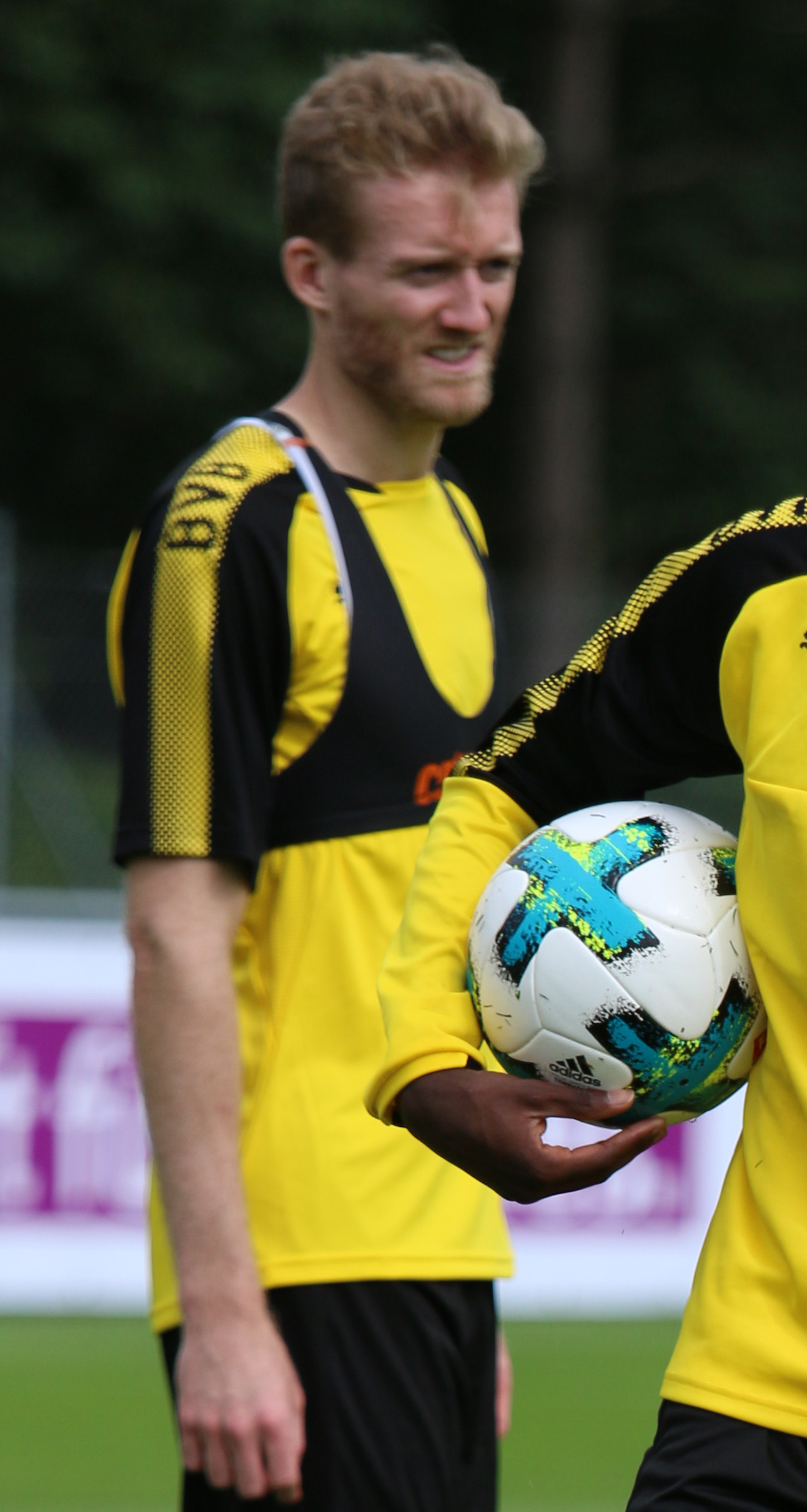
Schürrle training with Borussia Dortmund in 2017

On 22 July 2016, Schürrle joined Borussia Dortmund for an undisclosed fee. On 14 August 2016, Schürrle made his debut coming off the bench in 2–0 defeat against Bayern Munich in the DFL-Supercup.

==== Loan to Fulham ====
On 25 July 2018, Fulham announced the signing of Schürrle on a two-season loan. On 11 August, Schürrle made his debut in a 2–0 loss against Crystal Palace in the Premier League. On 26 August, Schürrle scored his first goal for the club in a 4–2 victory over Burnley. On 12 January 2019, he scored against Burnley again in a 2–1 defeat. His goal was later voted as Premier League Goal of the Month for January. His loan was cut short following Fulham being relegated from the Premier League.

==== Loan to Spartak Moscow ====
On 31 July 2019, Schürrle joined Russian Premier League club Spartak Moscow on a season-long loan. In his second league game on 11 August against FC Akhmat Grozny he scored his first RPL goal in a 3–1 win. On 1 July 2020, his loan expired and was not extended as he had not played for Spartak in 2020 due to injury.

=== Retirement ===
On 17 July 2020, Schürrle announced his retirement from professional football, at the age of 29. His decision came just a few days after he and Borussia Dortmund mutually agreed to terminate his contract. When speaking to Der Spiegel about retiring at a relatively young age, he stated that he no longer wanted to face the loneliness and endless competition inherent in top-flight football. Overall, he played nearly 300 top-flight matches in Germany, England and Russia.

== International career ==
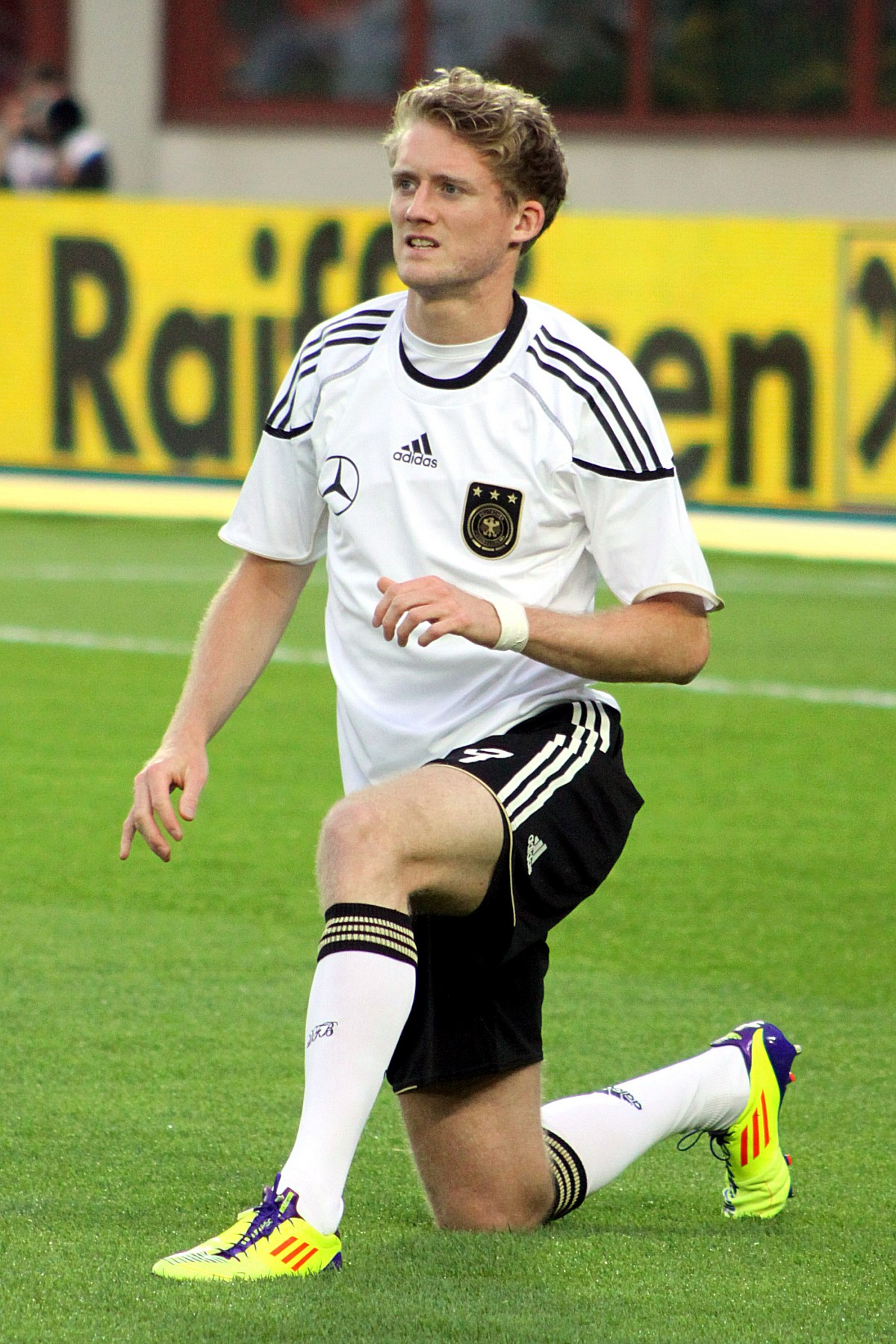
Schürrle playing for Germany in 2011

=== Youth team ===
Schürrle made his debut in a UEFA European Under-19 Football Championship qualifying match against Luxembourg, which resulted in a 3–0 win. After impressing for 1. FSV Mainz 05 in the Bundesliga he was called up to the under-21 team in 2009.

=== Senior team ===
In November 2010, Schürrle received a call up to the senior team. He subsequently made his debut in a friendly against Sweden, appearing as a substitute in the 79th minute. Schürrle and Mario Götze, who came on simultaneously, were the first two German international players to be born in reunified Germany. On 29 May 2011, Schürrle scored his first goal for the senior team, during a friendly against Uruguay in a 2–1 win.

Schürrle was chosen in Germany's squad for their qualification for UEFA Euro 2012. He scored against Azerbaijan in a 3–1 win, on 7 June 2011. On 2 September 2011, he scored again in the 6–2 thrashing victory over Austria, in both cases coming on as a substitute. In the next qualification fixture against Belgium on 11 October 2011, Schürrle was rewarded with his first start in the Euro 2012 qualifiers, and scored in the 33rd minute chipping over Simon Mignolet. After scoring three times during the campaign as Germany won ten out of ten games to top their group in their qualifiers, Schürrle was named in the Germany 23-man squad for UEFA Euro 2012 and was given the number nine shirt. He made his first appearance at Euro 2012 on 17 June, coming on as a substitute in the 64th minute for Lukas Podolski, in the 2–1 win over Denmark.

On 15 October 2013, Schürrle scored a hat-trick in a 5–3 away win against Sweden in 2014 FIFA World Cup qualification.

Schürrle was named in Germany's squad for the 2014 FIFA World Cup. He made his FIFA World Cup debut as a substitute in the team's opening match, a 4–0 victory over Portugal. In the 2–1 victory over Algeria in the round of 16, Schürrle came on for Götze as a half-time substitute and scored the opening goal of the match in the second minute of extra time. On 8 July, he scored Germany's final two goals after replacing Miroslav Klose as a 58th-minute substitute in a 7–1 semi-final victory over Brazil. Schürrle again came on as a substitute in the final against Argentina, replacing the injured Christoph Kramer in the first half. He provided the cross for Götze's winning goal in the 113th minute, as Germany won its fourth World Cup.

During qualification for UEFA Euro 2016, Schürrle scored a hat-trick in a 7–0 away win over Gibraltar on 13 June 2015. His international career ended after 57 appearances in March 2017.

Schürrle was a part of a collaboration between the German Football Association and The LEGO Group, who in May 2016 released a Europe-exclusive collectible minifigure series, with Schürrle being the twelfth of the sixteen minifigures in the collection.

== Playing style ==
Schürrle usually played as a winger but was naturally positioned as a second striker. One of his "key assets" was his "long-distance sprinting on the counter-attack." He also had an excellent fitness level, work-rate and pace. Schürrle was considered to be an "amazing finisher" and "capable of executing counter-attacks effectively". He often liked to cut inside, shoot from distance and enjoyed time on the ball. He is also known for his powerful shots outside the box making him a threat to the opposition.

== Personal life ==
Schürrle was born in Ludwigshafen, Rhineland-Palatinate to Luise and Joachim Schürrle. When he was a youngster, he told in an interview with German football magazine 11 Freunde that his idols were Michael Ballack and Raúl. He married Kazakh-born model Anna Sharypova at the end of 2018. Their first child, Kaia Schürrle, was born in April 2019.

== Career statistics ==
=== Club ===
Appearances and goals by club, season and competition
Club	Season	League			National cup (Note: Includes DFB-Pokal, FA Cup, Russian Cup)		League cup (Note: Includes EFL Cup)		Continental		Other		Total	
Club	Season	Division	Apps	Goals	Apps	Goals	Apps	Goals	Apps	Goals	Apps	Goals	Apps	Goals
Mainz 05	2009–10	Bundesliga	33	5	1	0	—		—		—		34	5
Mainz 05	2010–11	Bundesliga	33	15	1	0	—		—		—		34	15
Mainz 05	Total		66	20	2	0	—		—		—		68	20
Bayer Leverkusen	2011–12	Bundesliga	31	7	1	1	—		8 (Note: Appearances in UEFA Champions League)	1	—		40	9
Bayer Leverkusen	2012–13	Bundesliga	34	11	3	1	—		6 (Note: Appearances in UEFA Europa League)	2	—		43	14
Bayer Leverkusen	Total		65	18	4	2	—		14	3	—		83	23
Chelsea	2013–14	Premier League	30	8	1	0	1	0	10	1	1 (Note: Appearance in UEFA Super Cup)	0	43	9
Chelsea	2014–15	Premier League	14	3	1	0	3	1	4	1	—		22	5
Chelsea	Total		44	11	2	0	4	1	14	2	1	0	65	14
VfL Wolfsburg	2014–15	Bundesliga	14	1	4	0	—		4	0	—		22	1
VfL Wolfsburg	2015–16	Bundesliga	29	9	1	1	—		10	2	1 (Note: Appearance in DFL-Supercup)	0	41	12
VfL Wolfsburg	Total		43	10	5	1	—		14	2	1	0	63	13
Borussia Dortmund	2016–17	Bundesliga	15	2	3	2	—		6	1	1	0	25	5
Borussia Dortmund	2017–18	Bundesliga	18	1	3	0	—		5 (Note: One appearance in UEFA Champions League, four appearances and two goals in UEFA Europa League)	2	0	0	26	3
Borussia Dortmund	Total		33	3	6	2	—		11	3	1	0	51	8
Fulham (loan)	2018–19	Premier League	24	6	0	0	1	0	—		—		25	6
Spartak Moscow (loan)	2019–20	Russian Premier League	13	1	1	0	—		4	1	—		18	2
Career total			288	69	20	5	5	1	57	11	3	0	373	86

=== International ===
Appearances and goals by national team and year
National team	Year	Apps	Goals
Germany	2010	1	0
Germany	2011	10	5
Germany	2012	9	2
Germany	2013	10	4
Germany	2014	12	6
Germany	2015	7	3
Germany	2016	6	0
Germany	2017	2	2
Total		57	22

Scores and results list Germany's goal tally first, score column indicates score after each Schürrle goal.

List of international goals scored by André Schürrle
No.	Date	Venue	Opponent	Score	Result	Competition
1	29 May 2011	Rhein-Neckar-Arena, Sinsheim, Germany	Uruguay	2–0	2–1	Friendly
2	7 June 2011	Tofiq Bahramov Republican Stadium, Baku, Azerbaijan	Azerbaijan	3–1	3–1	UEFA Euro 2012 qualifying
3	10 August 2011	Mercedes-Benz Arena, Stuttgart, Germany	Brazil	3–1	3–2	Friendly
4	2 September 2011	Veltins-Arena, Gelsenkirchen, Germany	Austria	5–2	6–2	UEFA Euro 2012 qualifying
5	11 October 2011	Esprit Arena, Düsseldorf, Germany	Belgium	2–0	3–1	UEFA Euro 2012 qualifying
6	26 May 2012	St. Jakob-Park, Basel, Switzerland	Switzerland	2–3	3–5	Friendly
7	31 May 2012	Red Bull Arena, Leipzig, Germany	Israel	2–0	2–0	Friendly
8	11 October 2013	RheinEnergieStadion, Cologne, Germany	Republic of Ireland	2–0	3–0	2014 FIFA World Cup qualification
9	15 October 2013	Friends Arena, Stockholm, Sweden	Sweden	3–2	5–3	2014 FIFA World Cup qualification
10	15 October 2013	Friends Arena, Stockholm, Sweden	Sweden	4–2	5–3	2014 FIFA World Cup qualification
11	15 October 2013	Friends Arena, Stockholm, Sweden	Sweden	5–3	5–3	2014 FIFA World Cup qualification
12	1 June 2014	Borussia-Park, Mönchengladbach, Germany	Cameroon	2–1	2–2	Friendly
13	6 June 2014	Opel Arena, Mainz, Germany	Armenia	1–0	6–1	Friendly
14	30 June 2014	Estádio Beira-Rio, Porto Alegre, Brazil	Algeria	1–0	2–1	2014 FIFA World Cup
15	8 July 2014	Mineirão, Belo Horizonte, Brazil	Brazil	6–0	7–1	2014 FIFA World Cup
16	8 July 2014	Mineirão, Belo Horizonte, Brazil	Brazil	7–0	7–1	2014 FIFA World Cup
17	3 September 2014	Esprit Arena, Düsseldorf, Germany	Argentina	1–4	2–4	Friendly
18	13 June 2015	Estádio Algarve, Algarve, Portugal	Gibraltar	1–0	7–0	UEFA Euro 2016 qualifying
19	13 June 2015	Estádio Algarve, Algarve, Portugal	Gibraltar	5–0	7–0	UEFA Euro 2016 qualifying
20	13 June 2015	Estádio Algarve, Algarve, Portugal	Gibraltar	6–0	7–0	UEFA Euro 2016 qualifying
21	26 March 2017	Tofiq Bahramov Republican Stadium, Baku, Azerbaijan	Azerbaijan	1–0	4–1	2018 FIFA World Cup qualification
22	26 March 2017	Tofiq Bahramov Republican Stadium, Baku, Azerbaijan	Azerbaijan	4–1	4–1	2018 FIFA World Cup qualification

== Honours ==
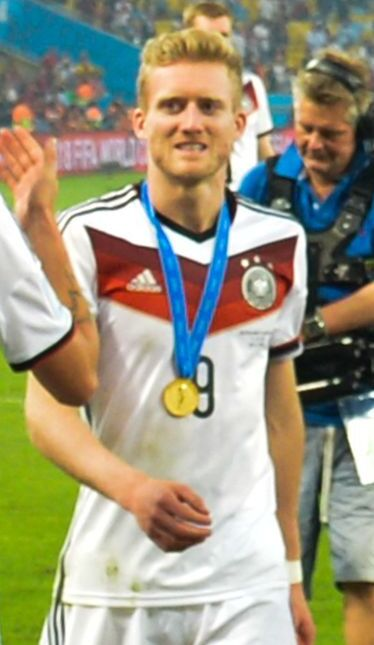
Schürrle celebrates winning the 2014 FIFA World Cup with Germany

Mainz 05 U19

- Under 19 Bundesliga: 2008–09

Chelsea

- Premier League: 2014–15
- Football League Cup: 2014–15

Wolfsburg

- DFB-Pokal: 2014–15
- DFL-Supercup: 2015

Borussia Dortmund

- DFB-Pokal: 2016–17

Germany

- FIFA World Cup: 2014
- UEFA European Championship third place: 2012

Individual

- BBC Goal of the Month: August 2014
- Premier League Goal of the Month: January 2019
- BBC Goal of the Month: January 2019

Orders

- Silbernes Lorbeerblatt: 2014
