= Stefanos Kapino =

Greek footballer (born 1994)

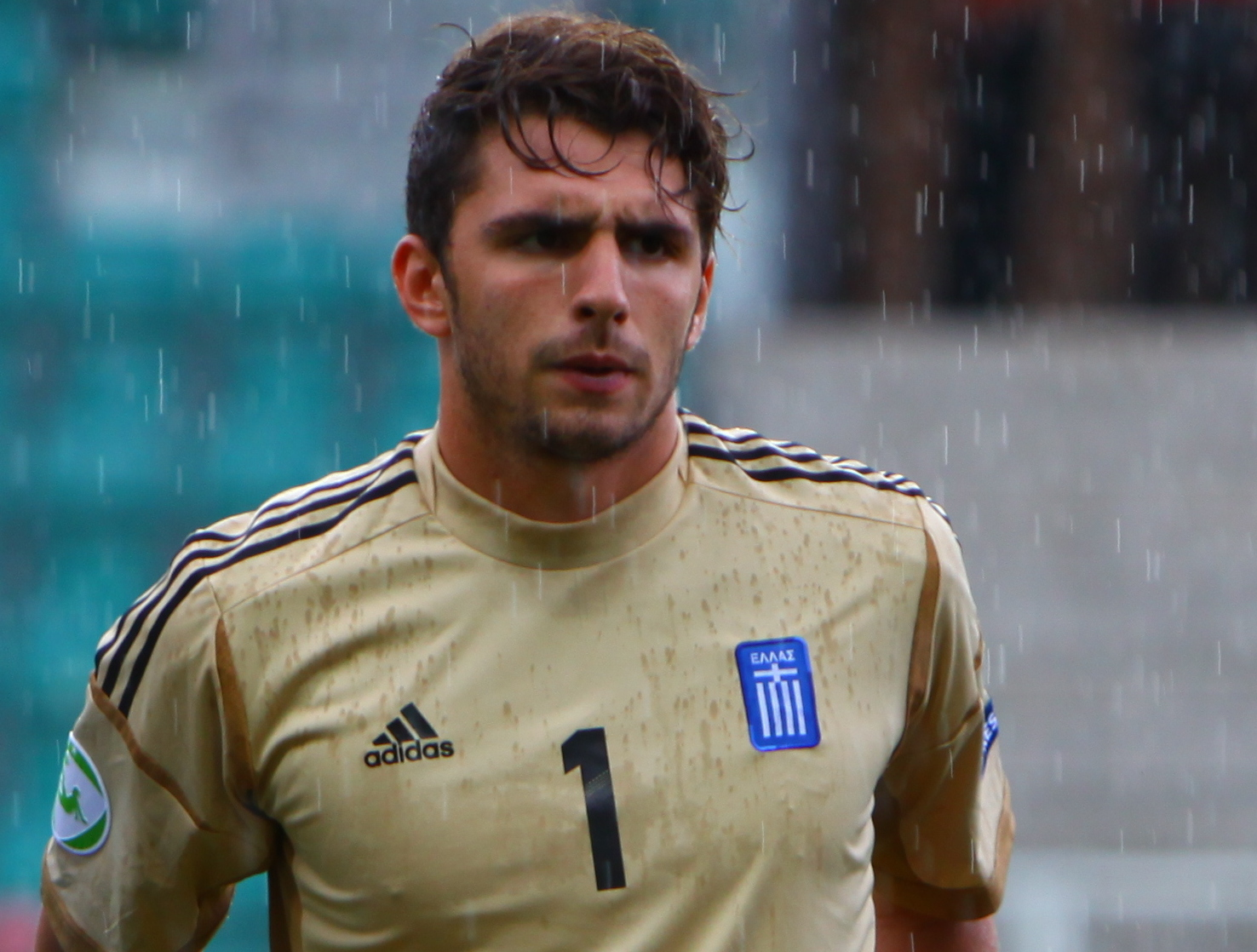
- Kapino with Greece U19 in 2012

Personal information
- Full name: Stefanos Kapino
- Date of birth: 18 March 1994 (age 32)
- Place of birth: Piraeus, Attica, Greece
- Height: 1.96 m (6 ft 5 in)
- Position: Goalkeeper

Team information
- Current team: AEL Limassol
- Number: 1

Youth career
- –2007: Aetos Korydallos
- 2007–2011: Panathinaikos

Senior career*
Years	Team	Apps	(Gls)
2011–2014	Panathinaikos	46	(0)
2014–2015	Mainz 05	2	(0)
2015–2018	Olympiacos	26	(0)
2018	Nottingham Forest	4	(0)
2018–2021	Werder Bremen	2	(0)
2021	→ SV Sandhausen (loan)	18	(0)
2021–2023	Arminia Bielefeld	6	(0)
2023	Miedź Legnica	4	(0)
2023–2024	Panetolikos	20	(0)
2024–2026	Winterthur	70	(0)
2026–	AEL Limassol	9	(0)

International career^{‡}
2009–2011	Greece U17	14	(0)
2011–2013	Greece U19	12	(0)
2013	Greece U20	7	(0)
2012–2016	Greece U21	10	(0)
2011–2017	Greece	9	(0)
Medal record
Men's football
Representing Greece
UEFA European Under-19 Championship
Runner-up	2012 Estonia
- * Club domestic league appearances and goals as of 7 November 2026 ‡ National team caps and goals as of 24 December 2020

Stefanos Kapino (Greek: Στέφανος Καπίνο; born 18 March 1994) is a Greek professional footballer who plays for Cypriot First Division club AEL Limassol.

== Early life ==
Stefanos was born in Piraeus to an ethnic Greek family who came to Greece from southern Albania (Northern Epirus). He began playing football in the youth system of the amateur club Aetos based in Korydallos, Piraeus. Although he was firstly approached by Olympiacos scouts, and even trained with the team for two and a half months, Panathinaikos were the ones to secure his signature in June 2007 for a fee of €17,000. At Panathinaikos, he gradually established himself as a member of the starting lineup for the club's under-18 and under-21 teams.

== Club career ==
=== Panathinaikos ===
On 17 September 2011, during a Super League match against Atromitos, Kapino made his debut for Panathinaikos' men's team, coming on as a substitute after his teammate Orestis Karnezis was sent off. With that appearance, he became the youngest goalkeeper to ever play for Panathinaikos, at the age of 17 years, six months and nine days. He went on to play the following 11 matches, finishing his first season with 12 appearances.

The 2012–13 season saw Panathinaikos use four different managers – Jesualdo Ferreira, the Argentine Juan Ramón Rocha, Spanish Fabri and finally Giannis Vonortas – while the club finished sixth in the league. Kapino was limited to one appearances, in a home 3–2 win against Veria.

In summer 2013 he was linked with Arsenal, Inter Milan and Manchester United and it was reported a move to Napoli had broken down. The 2013–14 season proved to be Kapino's best season at Panathinaikos. He started as regular to most of the Super League games and as a consequence was selected for the final squad of the 2014 World Cup.

=== Mainz 05 ===
In 2014, Kapino moved to German Bundesliga side Mainz 05 for a transfer fee of reportedly €2.2 million and signed a four-year contract until 2018. He had to compete with Loris Karius for a spot in the starting grid. He made his Bundesliga debut on 7 February 2015 at home versus Hertha BSC as a 34th minute replacement for Christian Clemens after the starting goalkeeper Loris Karius was given a red card for a foul on the last man.

=== Olympiacos ===
After one year with Mainz, during which he could not establish himself, Kapino moved back to his native Greece to join Olympiacos, rivals of his former club Panathinaikos, on a three-year deal for a transfer of believed to be €2 million.

He made his Greek Super League debut for Olympiacos on 21 March 2016 away to Asteras Tripolis. He was part of the starting XI of the squad in the 2015–16 Greek Football Cup season, except in the final where Olympiacos were defeated by rivals AEK Athens in an empty Olympic Stadium.

On 27 July 2016, Kapino made his first European appearance with the club in the 3rd qualifying round of UEFA Champions League against the Israeli champions Hapoel Be'er Sheva He started the 2016–17 season as the indisputable first goalkeeper of the club. On 6 November 2016, he suffered a muscular injury during the second half of the 3–0 home win in the derby against Panathinaikos and was substituted by Nicola Leali. The injury would keep him on the sidelines for three to four weeks ruling him out of the Greece squad to face Belarus and Bosnia.

On 19 March 2017, Kapino returned to action following his replacement Leali's mistakes in two Europa League matches against Besiktas making saves that prevented a bigger defeat for Olympiacos in an away 1–0 derby loss against rivals Panathinaikos.

He started the 2017–18 season as the undisputed first goalkeeper of the club, despite the acquisition of ex-Belgian international Silvio Proto.

On 24 September 2017, Kapino was demoted to the club's U-20 squad ahead of an important UEFA Champions League game against Juventus following mistakes in the team's 3–2 Super League away loss against rivals AEK Athens after leading 0–2. This proved to be the last league game for Kapino who, after also appearing and underperforming in two Greek Cup fixtures, was put on the out-of-favour player list by Olympiacos on 4 December 2017. He was unable to find a club to continue his career after the end of the January 2018 transfer window, leading the Olympiacos board to the termination of his contract and his release on a free transfer.

=== Nottingham Forest ===
On 7 February 2018, days before the end of the transfer window for unattached players, Kapino signed with EFL Championship side Nottingham Forest, under the presidency of chairman Evangelos Marinakis, on an 18-month deal. On 21 April 2018, he made his debut with the club as a starter, in a 2–1 away loss against Cardiff City.

=== Werder Bremen ===
On 1 August 2018, Kapino joined Bundesliga side Werder Bremen for an undisclosed fee. According to media reports, he signed a contract until 2020 with an option of a further year while the transfer fee paid to Nottingham Forest was estimated at €300,000 which could rise up to €1 million depending on bonuses. A week later, he suffered an injury which could rule him out for three months. On 19 January 2019, he sat on the bench for the first time in a 1–0 home win against Hannover 96. On 13 April 2019, he made his debut with the club replacing the injured Jiří Pavlenka in the second half of a 2–1 Bundesliga home win game against SC Freiburg.

In July 2019, Kapino agreed a contract extension with the club. On 7 March 2019, almost a year since his last appearance as a starter, Kapino was in the starting XI replacing Pavlenka, who had been injured midweek.

Kapino joined 2. Bundesliga club SV Sandhausen on loan for the rest of the season in January 2021.

=== Arminia Bielefeld ===
Kapino moved to Bundesliga club Arminia Bielefeld for an undisclosed fee in August 2021, having agreed a contract until 2023. On 18 December, after regular goalkeeper Stefan Ortega had to self-quarantine after testing positive to COVID-19, Kapino played in a 2–0 away victory against RB Leipzig, in his club effort to avoid relegation.

=== Miedź Legnica ===
On 22 January 2023, Kapino had his Arminia Bielefeld contract amicably terminated, subsequently joining Ekstraklasa club Miedź Legnica until the end of the season. He made four league appearances before leaving the relegation-bound club by mutual consent on 19 May 2023.

=== Panetolikos ===
On 27 June 2023, Kapino returned to Greece joining Super League club Panetolikos, on a two-year contract.

=== Winterthur ===
On 6 August 2024, Kapino signed for Swiss Super League club Winterthur.

=== AEL Limassol ===
On 8 June 2026, Kapino signed a two-year contract with Cypriot First Division club AEL Limassol.

== International career ==
Kapino due to being born in Greece was eligible to represent Greece and his family roots being from southern Albania made him eligible for Albania, and he has been a member of the Greece under-17 and under-19 teams. He is the youngest player to ever play for Greece U17, having debuted at the age of 15.

On 15 November 2011, at the age of 17 years and 241 days, he made his debut for the men's national team in a friendly match against Romania, thus setting a new record for the youngest player ever to represent Greece at men's level.

Stefanos was member to the 23-man squad for 2014 FIFA World Cup in Brazil as third choice goalkeeper along with Orestis Karnezis and Panagiotis Glykos.

On 4 June 2016, Kapino came on as a first half substitute for injured first choice goalkeeper Orestis Karnezis and despite conceding a late goal, produced a stunning display for his native country making many world class saves in Greece's 1–0 away International Friendly defeat to Australia at Stadium Australia in Sydney.

On 25 March 2017, replacing injured Orestis Karnezis in a crucial 2018 FIFA World Cup qualification away match against Belgium did brilliantly throughout the game and especially at the extra time as he prevent Romelu Lukaku from scoring the winner from point-blank range with a brilliant double save, helping Greece to save the defeat in its effort to qualify for 2018 World Cup.

== Career statistics ==
=== Club ===
As of match played 25 October 2026

Appearances and goals by club, season and competition
Club	Season	League			Cup		Europe		Other		Total	
Club	Season	Division	Apps	Goals	Apps	Goals	Apps	Goals	Apps	Goals	Apps	Goals
Panathinaikos	2010–11	Super League Greece	0	0	0	0	—		—		0	0
Panathinaikos	2011–12	Super League Greece	12	0	0	0	—		—		12	0
Panathinaikos	2012–13	Super League Greece	1	0	2	0	0	0	—		3	0
Panathinaikos	2013–14	Super League Greece	33	0	0	0	—		—		33	0
Panathinaikos	Total		46	0	2	0	0	0	—		48	0
Mainz 05	2014–15	Bundesliga	2	0	0	0	0	0	—		2	0
Olympiacos	2015–16	Super League Greece	3	0	8	0	0	0	—		11	0
Olympiacos	2016–17	Super League Greece	18	0	3	0	4	0	—		25	0
Olympiacos	2017–18	Super League Greece	5	0	2	0	5	0	—		12	0
Olympiacos	Total		26	0	13	0	9	0	—		48	0
Nottingham Forest	2017–18	Championship	4	0	—		—		—		4	0
Werder Bremen	2018–19	Bundesliga	1	0	0	0	—		—		1	0
Werder Bremen	2019–20	Bundesliga	1	0	0	0	—		0	0	1	0
Werder Bremen	2020–21	Bundesliga	0	0	0	0	—		—		0	0
Werder Bremen	Total		2	0	0	0	—		0	0	2	0
SV Sandhausen (loan)	2020–21	2. Bundesliga	18	0	0	0	—		—		18	0
Arminia Bielefeld	2021–22	Bundesliga	1	0	0	0	—		—		1	0
Arminia Bielefeld	2022–23	2. Bundesliga	5	0	1	0	—		—		6	0
Arminia Bielefeld	Total		6	0	1	0	—		—		7	0
Miedź Legnica	2022–23	Ekstraklasa	4	0	0	0	—		—		4	0
Panetolikos	2023–24	Super League Greece	20	0	0	0	—		—		20	0
FC Winterthur	2024–25	Swiss Super League	33	0	3	0	—		—		36	0
FC Winterthur	2025–26	Swiss Super League	37	0	3	0	—		—		34	0
FC Winterthur	Total		70	0	6	0	—		—		76	0
AEL Limassol	2026–27	Cypriot First Division	7	0	0	0	—		—		6	0
Career total			205	0	22	0	9	0	0	0	236	0

=== International ===
As of match played 23 December 2020

Appearances and goals by national team and year
National team	Year	Apps	Goals
Greece	2011	1	0
Greece	2013	0	0
Greece	2014	1	0
Greece	2015	2	0
Greece	2016	4	0
Greece	2017	1	0
Greece	2021	0	0
Total		9	0

== Honours ==
Panathinaikos

- Greek Cup: 2013–14

Olympiacos

- Super League: 2015–16, 2016–17

Greece U19

- UEFA European Under-19 Championship runner-up: 2012

Individual

- UEFA European Under-19 Championship Team of the Tournament: 2011
