= Stefan Reinartz =

German footballer (born 1989)

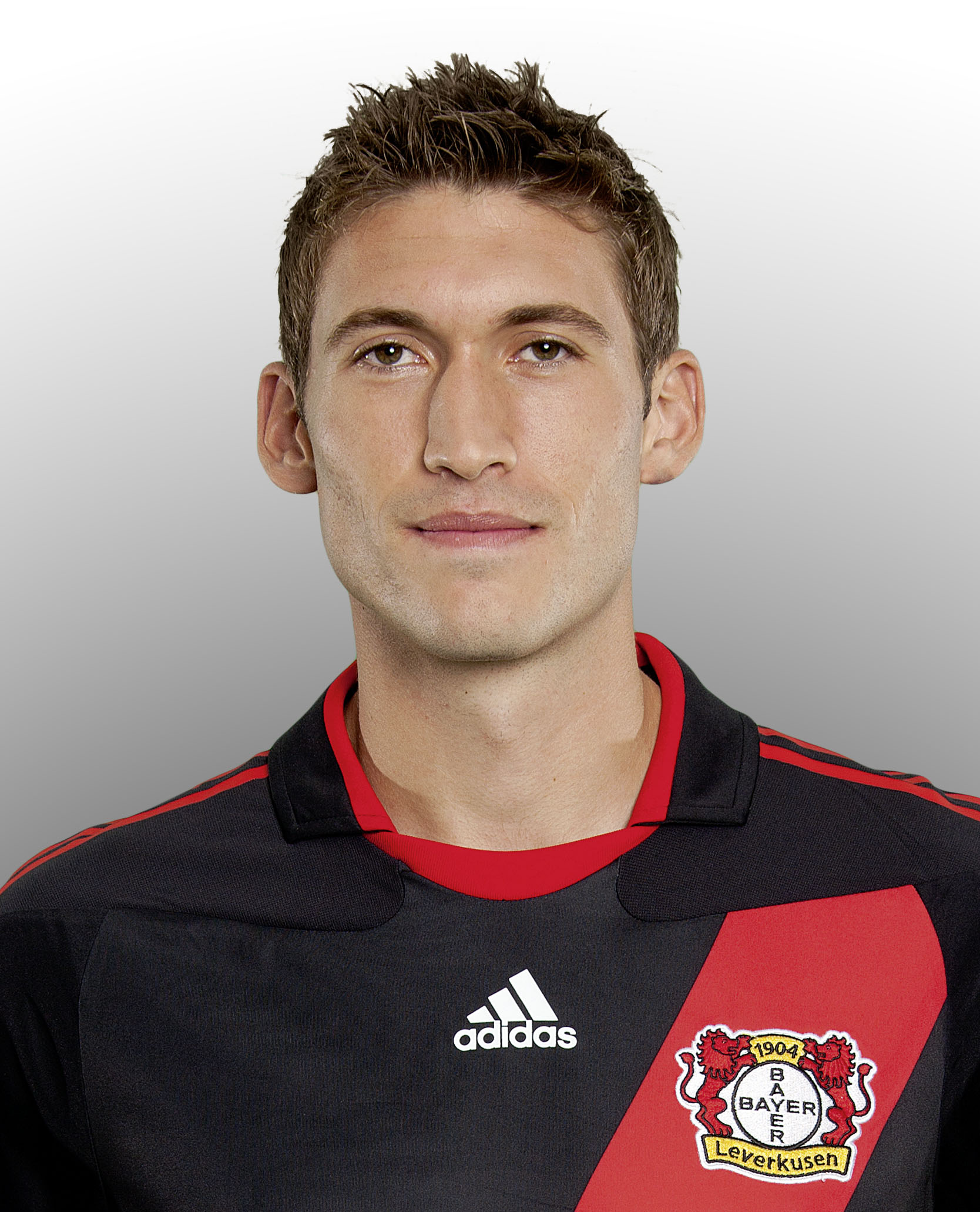
- Reinartz in 2011

Personal information
- Date of birth: 1 January 1989 (age 37)
- Place of birth: Engelskirchen, West Germany
- Height: 1.89 m (6 ft 2 in)
- Positions: Defensive midfielder; defender

Youth career
- 1993–1998: Heiligenhauser SV
- 1998–1999: Bergisch Gladbach 09
- 1999–2006: Bayer Leverkusen

Senior career*
Years	Team	Apps	(Gls)
2006–2009	Bayer Leverkusen II	35	(0)
2008–2015	Bayer Leverkusen	145	(11)
2009	→ 1. FC Nürnberg (loan)	16	(0)
2015–2016	Eintracht Frankfurt	15	(1)
Total		211	(12)

International career
2004–2005	Germany U16	4	(0)
2005–2006	Germany U17	9	(1)
2006–2007	Germany U18	4	(0)
2007–2008	Germany U19	10	(1)
2008–2009	Germany U20	4	(0)
2009–2010	Germany U21	6	(0)
2010–2013	Germany	3	(0)
- * Club domestic league appearances and goals

Stefan Reinartz (born 1 January 1989) is a German former professional footballer who played a defensive midfielder or defender.

== Career ==
Reinartz was born in Engelskirchen, North Rhine-Westphalia. He came through the ranks at Bayer Leverkusen, but did not play any games for them in the 2008–09 season. He made his professional debut in the Second Division while on loan with 1. FC Nürnberg on 9 February 2009 when he started a match against 1. FC Kaiserslautern. Reinartz played 163 German top-flight matches. The defender won three caps for Germany. He announced his retirement, at age 27, on 27 May 2016 due to injuries.

== Honours ==
Germany Youth

- UEFA European Under-19 Championship: 2008
