= Jiří Pavlenka =

Czech footballer (born 1992)

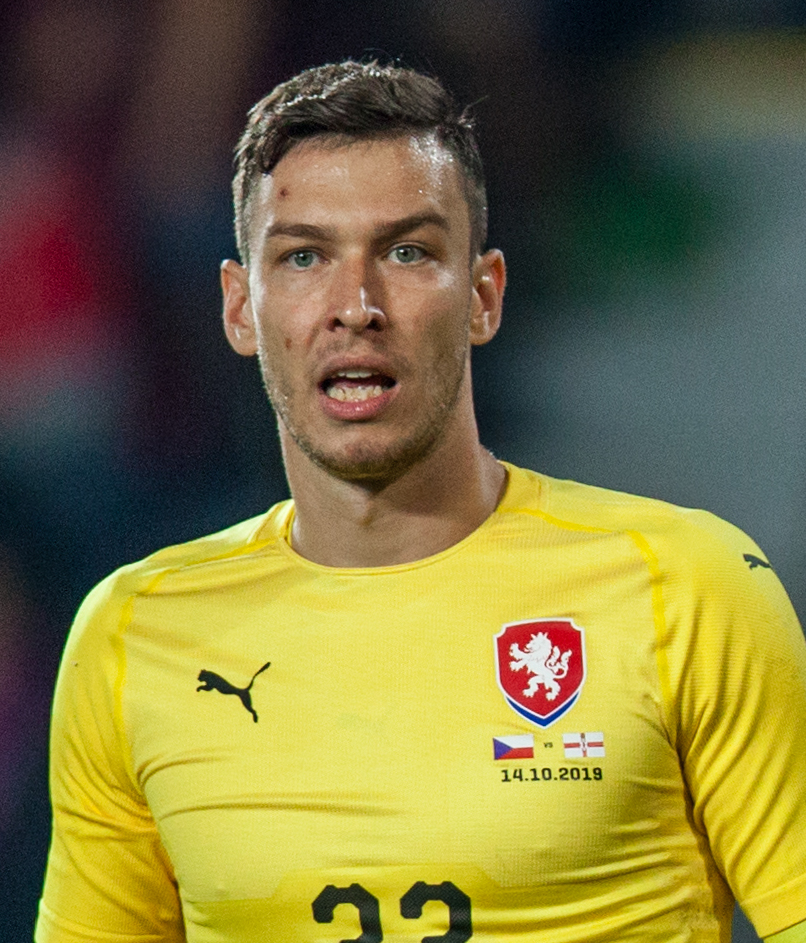
- Pavlenka playing for the Czech Republic in 2019

Personal information
- Date of birth: 14 April 1992 (age 34)
- Place of birth: Hlučín, Czechoslovakia
- Height: 1.96 m (6 ft 5 in)
- Position: Goalkeeper

Team information
- Current team: PAOK
- Number: 1

Youth career
- Baník Ostrava

Senior career*
Years	Team	Apps	(Gls)
2012–2016	Baník Ostrava	67	(0)
2016–2017	Slavia Prague	36	(0)
2017–2024	Werder Bremen	198	(0)
2024–	PAOK	27	(0)

International career
2013–2015	Czech Republic U21	5	(0)
2016–2023	Czech Republic	21	(0)
- * Club domestic league appearances and goals as of 20 September 2026

Jiří Pavlenka (born 14 April 1992) is a Czech professional footballer who plays as a goalkeeper for Super League Greece club PAOK.

== Club career ==
=== Slavia Prague ===
Pavlenka joined Slavia Prague from Baník Ostrava in January 2016 for a transfer fee of €380,000. He won the league title with Slavia Prague in the 2016–17 Czech First League season.

=== Werder Bremen ===
In June 2017, Pavlenka joined German Bundesliga side Werder Bremen, signing a three-year contract with the option of a fourth year. The transfer fee was estimated at €3 million. In August 2018, following a strong debut season in the Bundesliga, Pavlenka agreed to a contract extension with the club.

After the seventh matchday of the 2023–24 season, Pavlenka was replaced by Michael Zetterer as Bremen's first-choice goalkeeper and did not appear in any more matches for the rest of the season. His contract was not extended, and he left Bremen at the end of the season, making him a free agent.

=== PAOK ===
On 30 September 2024, Pavlenka moved to reigning Super League Greece champions PAOK on a free transfer. He signed a one-year contract with the option to extend for a further year.

== International career ==
Having represented under-21, Pavlenka received his first call-up to the senior Czech Republic side for a friendly against Slovakia in March 2015. He debuted for the senior side on 15 November 2016 in a friendly match against Denmark.

Along with other Czech players in Bundesliga, Pavlenka was called for the 2022 FIFA World Cup qualification in March 2021, and was allegedly only available for the first match against Estonia. However, due to COVID-19 pandemic in Germany, the German government removed the necessity for players to undergo a mandatory two-week quarantine after returning to Germany, which the Bundesliga clubs discouraged.

In May 2021, Pavlenka was included in the 26-man Czech squad for the postponed UEFA Euro 2020. He withdrew injured after a friendly match against Estonia, later replaced by Tomáš Koubek.

== Career statistics ==
=== Club ===
As of match played 27 August 2026

Appearances and goals by club, season and competition
Club	Season	League			Cup		Continental		Other		Total	
Club	Season	Division	Apps	Goals	Apps	Goals	Apps	Goals	Apps	Goals	Apps	Goals
Baník Ostrava	2012–13	Czech First League	1	0	0	0	—		—		1	0
Baník Ostrava	2013–14	Czech First League	20	0	0	0	—		—		20	0
Baník Ostrava	2014–15	Czech First League	30	0	0	0	—		—		30	0
Baník Ostrava	2015–16	Czech First League	16	0	0	0	—		—		16	0
Baník Ostrava	Total		67	0	0	0	—		—		67	0
Slavia Prague	2015–16	Czech First League	8	0	0	0	—		—		8	0
Slavia Prague	2016–17	Czech First League	28	0	1	0	4 (Note: Appearance(s) in UEFA Europa League)	0	—		33	0
Slavia Prague	Total		36	0	1	0	4	0	—		41	0
Werder Bremen	2017–18	Bundesliga	34	0	4	0	—		—		38	0
Werder Bremen	2018–19	Bundesliga	34	0	5	0	—		—		39	0
Werder Bremen	2019–20	Bundesliga	33	0	4	0	—		2 (Note: Appearances in Bundesliga relegation play-offs)	0	39	0
Werder Bremen	2020–21	Bundesliga	34	0	5	0	—		—		39	0
Werder Bremen	2021–22	2. Bundesliga	23	0	0	0	—		—		23	0
Werder Bremen	2022–23	Bundesliga	33	0	2	0	—		—		35	0
Werder Bremen	2023–24	Bundesliga	7	0	1	0	—		—		8	0
Werder Bremen	Total		198	0	21	0	—		2	0	221	0
PAOK	2024–25	Super League Greece	2	0	2	0	—		—		4	0
PAOK	2025–25	Super League Greece	20	0	0	0	8	0	—		28	0
PAOK	2026–27	Super League Greece	1	0	0	0	6 (Note: Four appearances in UEFA Europa League, two appearances in UEFA Conference League)	0	—		7	0
PAOK	Total		23	0	2	0	14	0	—		39	0
Career total			324	0	24	0	18	0	2	0	368	0

=== International ===
Appearances and goals by national team and year
National team	Year	Apps	Goals
Czech Republic	2016	1	0
Czech Republic	2017	3	0
Czech Republic	2018	4	0
Czech Republic	2019	3	0
Czech Republic	2020	1	0
Czech Republic	2021	2	0
Czech Republic	2022	2	0
Czech Republic	2023	5	0
Total		21	0

== Honours ==
Slavia Prague

- Czech First League: 2016–17

Czech Republic

- China Cup bronze: 2018
