= 2008–09 Bayer 04 Leverkusen season =

Bayer 04 Leverkusen
2008–09 season
- Manager: Bruno Labbadia
- Bundesliga: 9th
- DFB-Pokal: Runners-up
- Top goalscorer: League: Patrick Helmes (21); All: Patrick Helmes (24)
Home colours	Away colours	Third colours

During the 2008–09 season, Bayer 04 Leverkusen competed in the Bundesliga.

== Season summary ==
Leverkusen dropped further down the table to finish 9th, failing to qualify for European competition for a second consecutive year. Manager Bruno Labbadia left Leverkusen at the end of the season for Hamburg, and was replaced by erstwhile Bayern Munich caretaker Jupp Heynckes.

== Players ==
=== First-team squad ===
Squad at end of season

Note: Flags indicate national team as defined under FIFA eligibility rules; some limited exceptions apply. Players may hold more than one non-FIFA nationality.

No.	Pos.	Nation	Player
1	GK	GER	René Adler
2	DF	TUN	Karim Haggui
3	DF	BRA	Henrique (on loan from Barcelona)
5	DF	GER	Manuel Friedrich
6	MF	GER	Simon Rolfes
7	MF	SUI	Tranquillo Barnetta
8	MF	BRA	Renato Augusto
9	FW	GER	Patrick Helmes
11	FW	GER	Stefan Kießling
14	MF	GER	Sascha Dum
15	DF	GHA	Hans Sarpei
16	MF	SUI	Pirmin Schwegler
17	DF	SVK	Vratislav Greško

No.	Pos.	Nation	Player
18	DF	CIV	Constant Djakpa
19	MF	POL	Tomasz Zdebel
20	DF	GER	Lukas Sinkiewicz (Note: Sinkiewicz was born in Tychy, Poland, but also qualified to represent Germany internationally and represented Germany at U-19 and U-21 level before making his international debut for Germany in September 2005.)
21	GK	HUN	Gábor Király (on loan from Burnley)
22	GK	GER	Benedikt Fernandez
23	MF	CHI	Arturo Vidal
24	DF	CZE	Michal Kadlec
25	MF	GER	Bernd Schneider
27	DF	GER	Gonzalo Castro (Note: Castro was born in Wuppertal, West Germany)(now Germany), and represented Germany at U-21 level, but also qualified to represent Spain internationally through his parents and represented Spain at U-19 level before making his international debut for Germany in March 2007.)
29	FW	GRE	Angelos Charisteas (on loan from Nürnberg)
34	GK	GER	Erik Domaschke
39	MF	GER	Toni Kroos (on loan from Bayern Munich)
51	FW	GER	Richard Sukuta-Pasu

=== Left club during season ===
Note: Flags indicate national team as defined under FIFA eligibility rules; some limited exceptions apply. Players may hold more than one non-FIFA nationality.

No.	Pos.	Nation	Player
10	FW	GRE	Theofanis Gekas (on loan to Portsmouth)
13	FW	RUS	Dmitri Bulykin (to Anderlecht)
19	MF	GER	Marcel Risse (on loan to Nürnberg)

No.	Pos.	Nation	Player
33	DF	GER	Stefan Reinartz (on loan to Nürnberg)
45	MF	GER	Jens Hegeler (on loan to Augsburg)
