= Gonzalo Vázquez =

Gonzalo Vázquez may refer to:

- Gonzalo Vázquez Vela (1893–1963), Mexican politician, governor of Veracruz
- Gonzalo E. Vazquez, Venezuelan investment banker (article may have been created or edited in return for undisclosed payments, a violation of Wikipedia's terms of use)
- Gonzalo Vázquez de Coronado y Arias Dávila (1552–1612), Spanish conquistador, son of Juan Vázquez de Coronado

== See also ==
- Gonzalo Vásquez, a village in Panama
- Gonzalo Vásquez (footballer)
