= 2009 DFB-Pokal final =

- Match programme cover
- Event: 2008–09 DFB-Pokal
Bayer Leverkusen	Werder Bremen
0	1
- Date: 30 May 2009
- Venue: Olympiastadion, Berlin
- Referee: Helmut Fleischer (Sigmertshausen)
- Attendance: 74,400
- Weather: Thunderstorms and rain 15 °C (59 °F); 94% humidity

The final of the 2008–09 DFB-Pokal season was held on 30 May 2009 at the Olympiastadion in Berlin, between Bayer Leverkusen and Werder Bremen.

Werder Bremen won the match 1–0 with a 58th-minute goal from midfielder Mesut Özil. This was the club's sixth DFB-Pokal in its history, after victories in 1961, 1991, 1994, 1999 and 2004. This was Bayer Leverkusen's second DFB-Pokal final loss of the decade, the other occurring in 2002. Werder Bremen had lost the 2009 UEFA Cup final ten days prior, suffering a defeat to Ukrainian side Shakhtar Donetsk.

== Route to the final ==
The DFB-Pokal began with 64 teams in a single-elimination knockout cup competition. There were a total of five rounds leading up to the final. Teams were drawn against each other, and the winner after 90 minutes advanced. If still tied, 30 minutes of extra time were played. If the score was still level, a penalty shoot-out was used to determine the winner.

Note: In all results below, the score of the finalist is given first (H: home; A: away).

Bayer Leverkusen		Round	Werder Bremen	
Opponent	Result	2008–09 DFB-Pokal	Opponent	Result
Rot-Weiß Oberhausen (A)	3–2 (a.e.t.)	First round	Eintracht Nordhorn (A)	9–3
FC Augsburg (A)	2–0	Second round	Erzgebirge Aue (A)	2–1
Energie Cottbus (H)	3–1	Round of 16	Borussia Dortmund (A)	2–1
Bayern Munich (H)	4–2	Quarter-finals	VfL Wolfsburg (A)	5–2
Mainz 05 (H)	4–1 (a.e.t.)	Semi-finals	Hamburger SV (A)	1–1 (a.e.t.) (3–1 p)

== Match ==
=== Details ===
30 May 2009
20:00 CEST

Bayer Leverkusen	0–1	Werder Bremen
	Report	Özil 58'

Olympiastadion, Berlin
Attendance: 74,400
Referee: Helmut Fleischer (Sigmertshausen)

Bayer Leverkusen	Werder Bremen

GK	1	(Germany) René Adler
RB	27	(Germany) Gonzalo Castro		(substituted off) 85'
CB	20	(Germany) Lukas Sinkiewicz
CB	5	(Germany) Manuel Friedrich
LB	24	(Czech Republic) Michal Kadlec
RM	8	(Brazil) Renato Augusto
CM	23	(Chile) Arturo Vidal	(yellow card) 68'	(substituted off) 85'
CM	6	(Germany) Simon Rolfes (c)
LM	7	(Switzerland) Tranquillo Barnetta
CF	9	(Germany) Patrick Helmes
CF	11	(Germany) Stefan Kießling	(yellow card) 79'
Substitutes:
GK	21	(Hungary) Gábor Király
DF	2	(Tunisia) Karim Haggui
DF	3	(Brazil) Henrique
MF	16	(Switzerland) Pirmin Schwegler
MF	25	(Germany) Bernd Schneider
MF	39	(Germany) Toni Kroos		(substituted on) 85'
FW	29	(Greece) Angelos Charisteas		(substituted on) 85'
Manager:
(Germany) Bruno Labbadia

GK	1	(Germany) Tim Wiese	(yellow card) 90+2'
RB	8	(Germany) Clemens Fritz
CB	15	(Austria) Sebastian Prödl	(yellow card) 37'
CB	4	(Brazil) Naldo
LB	2	(Poland) Sebastian Boenisch
DM	6	(Germany) Frank Baumann (c)		(substituted off) 60'
CM	22	(Germany) Torsten Frings	(yellow card) 90+2'
CM	11	(Germany) Mesut Özil		(substituted off) 87'
AM	10	(Brazil) Diego
CF	24	(Peru) Claudio Pizarro
CF	23	(Portugal) Hugo Almeida		(substituted off) 90'
Substitutes:
GK	33	(Germany) Christian Vander
DF	3	(Finland) Petri Pasanen
DF	25	(Germany) Peter Niemeyer	(yellow card) 84'	(substituted on) 60'
MF	16	(Greece) Alexandros Tziolis		(substituted on) 87'
FW	9	(Sweden) Markus Rosenberg		(substituted on) 90'
FW	14	(Germany) Aaron Hunt
FW	34	(Austria) Martin Harnik
Manager:
(Germany) Thomas Schaaf

Assistant referees:
Sönke Glindemann (Erftstadt)
Guido Kleve (Nordhorn)
Fourth official:
Lutz Wagner (Kriftel)

Match rules

- 90 minutes.
- 30 minutes of extra time if necessary.
- Penalty shoot-out if scores still level.
- Seven named substitutes, of which up to three may be used.
