= 2007–08 Bayer 04 Leverkusen season =

Bayer 04 Leverkusen
2007–08 season
- Manager: Michael Skibbe
- Stadium: BayArena
- Bundesliga: 7th
- DFB-Pokal: First round
- UEFA Cup: Quarter-finals
- Top goalscorer: League: Theofanis Gekas (11); All: Stefan Kießling (16)
Home colours	Away colours	Third colours

During the 2007–08 German football season, Bayer 04 Leverkusen competed in the Bundesliga.

== Season summary ==
Despite recording an identical league record to the previous season, Leverkusen dropped to 7th, the first time they had failed to qualify for Europe in five seasons. Michael Skibbe was sacked as a result, and was replaced by Greuther Fürth manager Bruno Labbadia.

== First-team squad ==
Squad at end of season

Note: Flags indicate national team as defined under FIFA eligibility rules; some limited exceptions apply. Players may hold more than one non-FIFA nationality.

No.	Pos.	Nation	Player
1	GK	GER	René Adler
2	DF	TUN	Karim Haggui
5	DF	GER	Manuel Friedrich
6	MF	GER	Simon Rolfes
7	MF	SUI	Tranquillo Barnetta
8	MF	GER	Paul Freier (Note: Freier was born in Bytom, Poland, but was raised in Germany from the age of 11 and represented Germany at U-21 level before making his international debut for Germany in May 2002.)
10	FW	GRE	Theofanis Gekas
11	FW	GER	Stefan Kießling
13	FW	RUS	Dmitri Bulykin
14	MF	GER	Sascha Dum
15	DF	GHA	Hans Sarpei
16	MF	SUI	Pirmin Schwegler
17	DF	SVK	Vratislav Greško
19	MF	GER	Marcel Risse

No.	Pos.	Nation	Player
20	DF	GER	Lukas Sinkiewicz (Note: Sinkiewicz was born in Tychy, Poland, but also qualified to represent Germany internationally and represented Germany at U-19 and U-21 level before making his international debut for Germany in September 2005.)
22	GK	GER	Benedikt Fernandez
23	MF	CHI	Arturo Vidal
25	MF	GER	Bernd Schneider
27	MF	GER	Gonzalo Castro (Note: Castro was born in Wuppertal, West Germany)(now Germany), and represented Germany at U-21 level, but also qualified to represent Spain internationally through his parents and represented Spain at U-19 level before making his international debut for Germany in March 2007.)
28	DF	GER	Carsten Ramelow
29	DF	GER	Jan-Ingwer Callsen-Bracker
33	MF	GER	Stefan Reinartz
34	GK	GER	Erik Domaschke
35	DF	GER	Kim Falkenberg
36	FW	BIH	Sergej Barbarez
45	MF	GER	Jens Hegeler
53	GK	GER	Fabian Giefer

=== Left club during season ===
Note: Flags indicate national team as defined under FIFA eligibility rules; some limited exceptions apply. Players may hold more than one non-FIFA nationality.

No.	Pos.	Nation	Player
4	MF	FRA	Ricardo Faty (Note: Faty was born in Villeneuve-Saint-Georges, France, and represented them at U-21 level, but also qualified to represent Cape Verde and Senegal internationally through his mother and father respectively and made his international debut for Senegal in 2012.) (on loan from Roma)
24	DF	TOG	Assimiou Touré (Note: Touré was born in Sokodé, Togo, but also qualified to represent Germany internationally and represented Germany at U-18 level before making his international debut for Togo in 2006.) (on loan to VfL Osnabrück)

No.	Pos.	Nation	Player
26	FW	CZE	Michal Papadopulos (on loan to Energie Cottbus)
30	FW	GER	Dennis Schmidt (to Wehen Wiesbaden)
