= 2006–07 Bayer 04 Leverkusen season =

Bayer 04 Leverkusen
2006–07 season
- Manager: Michael Skibbe
- Stadium: BayArena
- Bundesliga: 5th
- DFB-Pokal: Second round
- UEFA Cup: Quarter-finals
Home colours	Away colours

During the 2006–07 German football season, Bayer 04 Leverkusen competed in the Bundesliga.

== Season summary ==
Leverkusen repeated the previous season's fifth-placed finish, qualifying again for the UEFA Cup.

== First-team squad ==
Squad at end of season

Note: Flags indicate national team as defined under FIFA eligibility rules; some limited exceptions apply. Players may hold more than one non-FIFA nationality.

No.	Pos.	Nation	Player
1	GK	GER	Hans-Jörg Butt
2	DF	SWE	Fredrik Stenman
3	DF	BRA	Roque Júnior
4	DF	BRA	Juan
5	DF	TUN	Karim Haggui
6	MF	GER	Simon Rolfes
7	MF	SUI	Tranquillo Barnetta
9	FW	BIH	Sergej Barbarez
10	MF	GER	Paul Freier (Note: Freier was born in Bytom, Poland, but was raised in Germany from the age of 11 and represented Germany at U-21 level before making his international debut for Germany in May 2002.)
11	FW	GER	Stefan Kießling
12	FW	UKR	Andriy Voronin
13	MF	BRA	Athirson
16	MF	SUI	Pirmin Schwegler
17	DF	GER	Alexander Meyer

No.	Pos.	Nation	Player
19	MF	CRO	Marko Babić
20	GK	GER	Benedikt Fernandez
22	GK	GER	René Adler
23	DF	ALG	Ahmed Reda Madouni (Note: Madouni was born in Casablanca, Morocco, but also qualified to represent Algeria internationally and made his international debut for Algeria in June 2005.)
24	DF	TOG	Assimiou Touré (Note: Touré was born in Sokodé, Togo, but also qualified to represent Germany internationally and represented Germany at U-18 level before making his international debut for Togo in 2006.)
25	MF	GER	Bernd Schneider
26	FW	CZE	Michal Papadopulos
27	MF	GER	Gonzalo Castro (Note: Castro was born in Wuppertal, West Germany (now Germany), and represented Germany at U-21 level, but also qualified to represent Spain internationally through his parents and represented Spain at U-19 level before making his international debut for Germany in March 2007.)
28	DF	GER	Carsten Ramelow
29	DF	GER	Jan-Ingwer Callsen-Bracker
32	MF	GER	Pierre de Wit
34	GK	GER	Erik Domaschke
44	DF	GER	Thomas Hübener

=== Left club during season ===
Note: Flags indicate national team as defined under FIFA eligibility rules; some limited exceptions apply. Players may hold more than one non-FIFA nationality.

No.	Pos.	Nation	Player
14	FW	CRO	Josip Tadić (to Dinamo Zagreb)
