= Gonzalo Castro =

German footballer

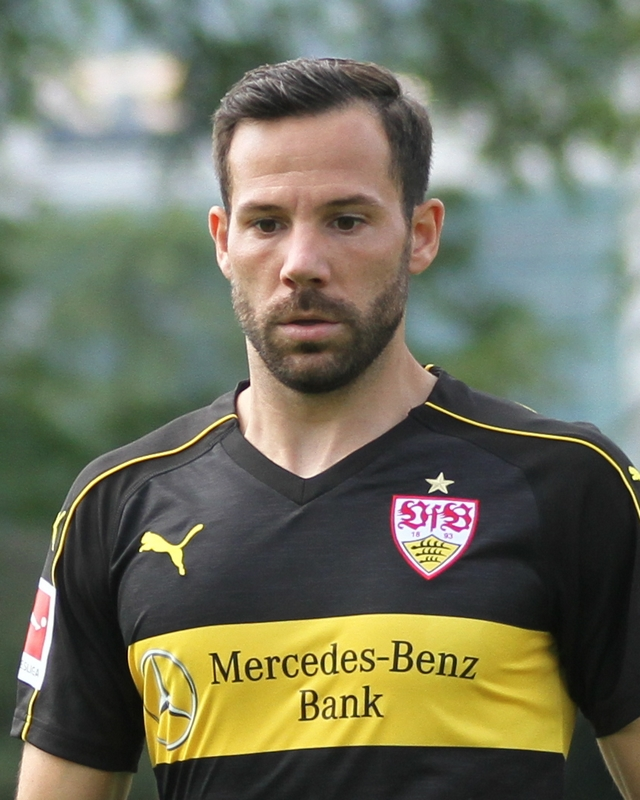
- Castro with VfB Stuttgart in 2018

Personal information
- Full name: Gonzalo Castro Randón
- Date of birth: 11 June 1987 (age 39)
- Place of birth: Wuppertal, Germany
- Height: 1.72 m (5 ft 7 1/2 in)
- Positions: Midfielder; centre-back

Youth career
- Post SV Wuppertal
- Viktoria Rott
- –1999: Bayer Wuppertal
- 1999–2005: Bayer Leverkusen

Senior career*
Years	Team	Apps	(Gls)
2005–2006	Bayer Leverkusen II	10	(3)
2004–2015	Bayer Leverkusen	286	(25)
2015–2018	Borussia Dortmund	72	(6)
2018–2021	VfB Stuttgart	79	(9)
2021–2022	Arminia Bielefeld	12	(1)
2025-	Roland Bürrig		
Total		459	(44)

International career
2005	Spain U19	1	(0)
2006–2009	Germany U21	21	(3)
2007	Germany	5	(0)
Medal record
Men's football
Representing Germany
UEFA European Under-21 Championship
Winner	2009 Sweden
- * Club domestic league appearances and goals

Gonzalo Castro Randón (born 11 June 1987) is a German former professional footballer who played as a midfielder. He is also a former Germany international.

During a 17-year professional career, Castro played in over 400 Bundesliga matches for Bayer Leverkusen, Borussia Dortmund, VfB Stuttgart and Arminia Bielefeld.

== Club career ==
=== Bayer Leverkusen ===
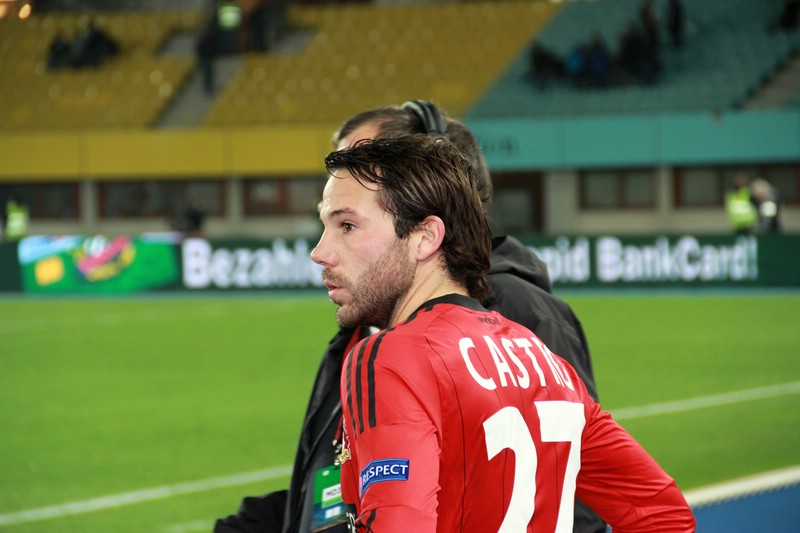
Castro before coming on in a match in 2012

Born in Wuppertal to Spanish parents, he began his career with Post SV Wuppertal. Other clubs during his youth were Viktoria Rott and SV Bayer Wuppertal. In 1999, he moved to Bayer Leverkusen. At 17, he played his first game for the Leverkusen senior team in the Bundesliga and in the Champions League. In his first year, he played the last 13 matches of the season. He played 21 times in the 2005–06 season as a substitute. From 2006, Castro moved from midfield to the back four of Leverkusen and played with solid performances in the starting eleven. For four consecutive seasons he largely held his place. Only in the 2010–11 season, he saw his place on the right side of defence contested by Daniel Schwaab. Since the 2012–13 season, Castro has again played in midfield.

Castro trained as a sports and fitness administrator at Bayer Leverkusen.

=== Borussia Dortmund ===
On 24 May 2015, it was announced that Castro would join Borussia Dortmund after a transfer release clause of 11 million was met, signing a four-year deal. On 28 October, Castro scored a brace in a 7–1 win against Paderborn in the second round of the DFB-Pokal. On 29 November, Castro scored his first league goal for Dortmund in a 4–1 win over VfB Stuttgart. On 20 April 2016, he was one of three goalscorers as Dortmund won 3–0 away at Hertha BSC in the semi-final of the same competition to reach the 2016 DFB-Pokal Final. In March 2017, the club extended his contract until 30 June 2020.

=== VfB Stuttgart ===
On 29 June 2018, Castro signed a three-year contract with VfB Stuttgart, enabling him to join the club on 1 July 2018.

=== Arminia Bielefeld ===
On 21 December 2021, Castro signed for Arminia Bielefeld on a contract until the end of the season, with an option to extend the deal for a further year.

In September 2022, after his contract with Arminia was not renewed, Castro announced his retirement from professional football.

== International career ==
In his youth, Castro was invited by the Spanish Football Federation to several courses. He played a single match for a Spanish junior selection and chose at the age of 18 to play for the German Football Association. Castro has played for the German national U-21 team at the 2006 UEFA European Under-21 Football Championship. After three test caps at the beginning of 2006, Castro gained a place in the German squad for the finals of the U-21 European Championship 2006 in Portugal. There he delivered solid performances. His biggest footballing success was winning the U-21 Championship 2009 in Sweden under coach Horst Hrubesch. In a 4–0 victory in the final against England, Castro scored the first goal in the 23rd minute.

In the European Championship qualifier against the Czech Republic on 24 March 2007, Castro was called up to the senior squad for the first time and four days later, he made his debut against Denmark. Following this, Castro would never again feature in the national squad.

== Career statistics ==
=== Club ===
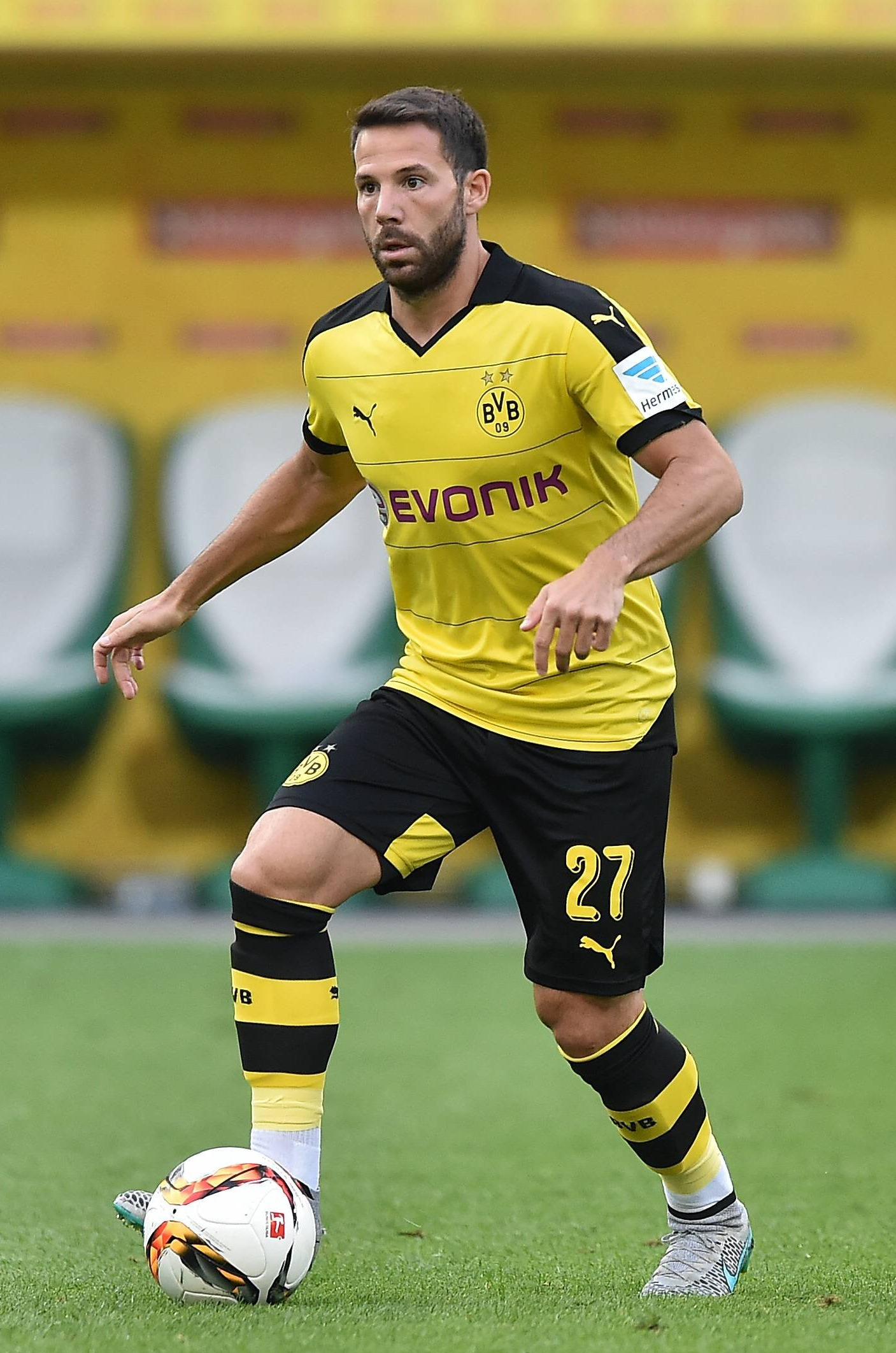
Castro with Borussia Dortmund in 2015

Club	Season	League			DFB-Pokal		Europe		Other		Total	
Club	Season	Division	Apps	Goals	Apps	Goals	Apps	Goals	Apps	Goals	Apps	Goals
Bayer Leverkusen	2004–05	Bundesliga	13	0	0	0	1 (Note: Appearance(s) in UEFA Champions League)	0	0	0	14	0
Bayer Leverkusen	2005–06	Bundesliga	21	0	2	0	2 (Note: Appearances in UEFA Cup)	0	1 (Note: Appearance in DFL-Ligapokal)	0	26	0
Bayer Leverkusen	2006–07	Bundesliga	26	3	1	0	11	0	1	0	39	3
Bayer Leverkusen	2007–08	Bundesliga	33	1	1	0	11	0	—		45	1
Bayer Leverkusen	2008–09	Bundesliga	27	2	6	0	—		—		33	2
Bayer Leverkusen	2009–10	Bundesliga	29	1	1	0	—		—		30	1
Bayer Leverkusen	2010–11	Bundesliga	23	3	1	0	8 (Note: Appearances in UEFA Europa League)	3	—		32	6
Bayer Leverkusen	2011–12	Bundesliga	31	2	1	0	8	0	—		40	2
Bayer Leverkusen	2012–13	Bundesliga	31	6	3	0	6	2	—		40	8
Bayer Leverkusen	2013–14	Bundesliga	30	5	3	0	6	0	—		39	5
Bayer Leverkusen	2014–15	Bundesliga	22	2	3	0	7	0	—		32	2
Bayer Leverkusen	Total		286	25	22	0	60	5	2	0	370	30
Bayer Leverkusen II	2005–06	Regionalliga Nord	10	3	—		—		—		10	3
Borussia Dortmund	2015–16	Bundesliga	25	3	5	3	11	1	—		41	7
Borussia Dortmund	2016–17	Bundesliga	28	3	6	0	7	1	1 (Note: Appearance in DFL-Supercup)	0	42	4
Borussia Dortmund	2017–18	Bundesliga	19	0	2	1	6	0	1	0	28	1
Borussia Dortmund	Total		72	6	13	4	24	2	2	0	111	12
VfB Stuttgart	2018–19	Bundesliga	25	2	1	0	—		2 (Note: Appearances in Bundesliga relegation play-offs)	0	28	2
VfB Stuttgart	2019–20	2. Bundesliga	28	3	3	0	—		—		31	3
VfB Stuttgart	2020–21	Bundesliga	26	4	2	0	—		0	0	28	4
VfB Stuttgart	Total		79	9	6	0	—		2	0	87	9
Arminia Bielefeld	2021–22	Bundesliga	12	1	0	0	—		—		12	1
Career total			459	44	41	4	84	7	6	0	590	55

== Honours ==
Bayer Leverkusen

- DFB-Pokal runner-up: 2008–09

Borussia Dortmund

- DFB-Pokal: 2016–17

Germany U21

- UEFA European Under-21 Championship: 2009

Individual

- UEFA Europa League Squad of the Season: 2015–16
