= Benjamin Bellot =

German footballer (born 1990)

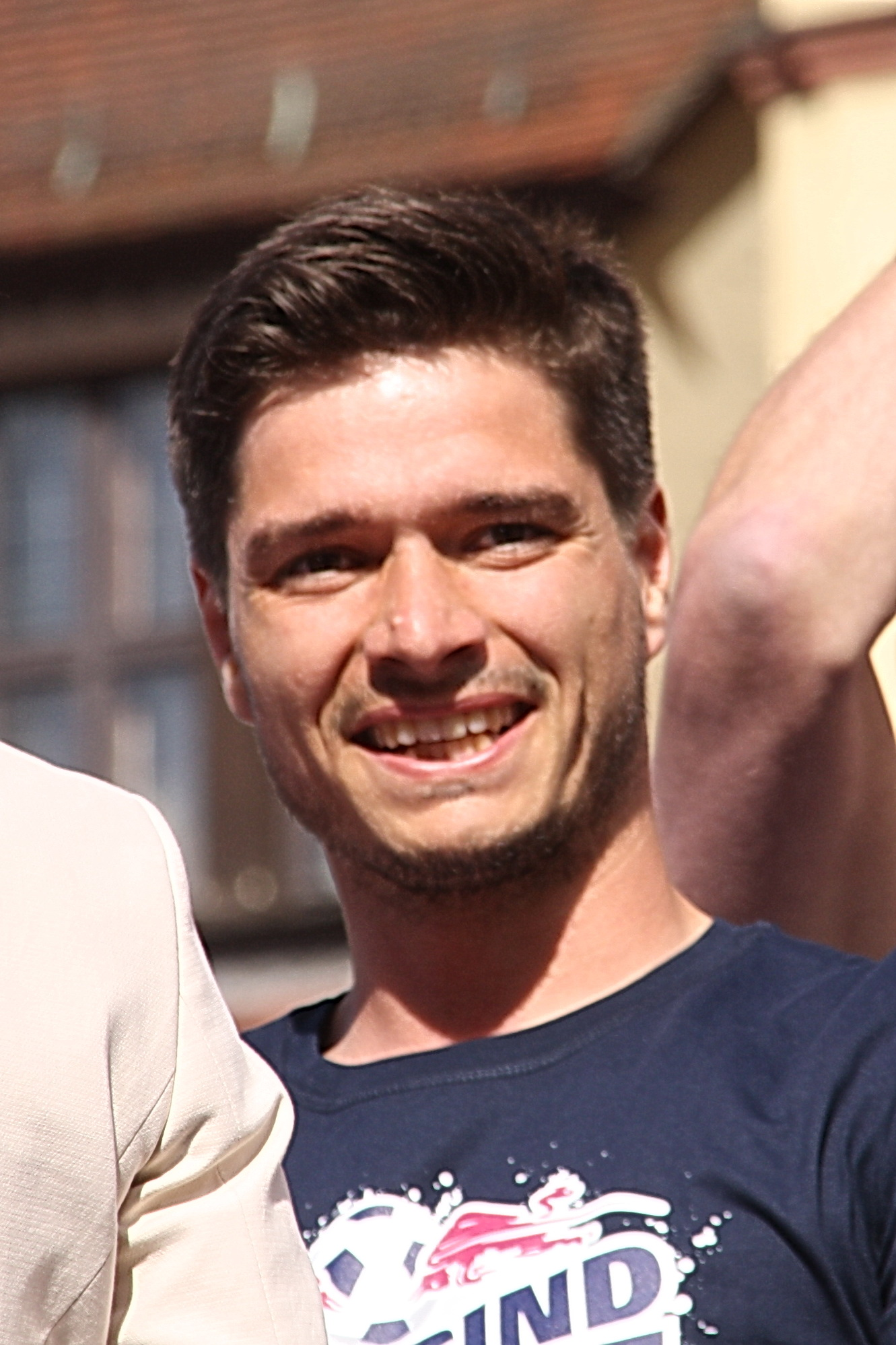
- Bellot in 2016

Personal information
- Date of birth: 30 July 1990 (age 36)
- Place of birth: Leipzig, East Germany
- Height: 1.84 m (6 ft 0 in)
- Position: Goalkeeper

Youth career
- 1995–: Blau-Weiß Günthersdorf
- –2004: VfB Leipzig
- 2004–2008: Sachsen Leipzig

Senior career*
| Years | Team | Apps | (Gls) |
| 2008–2009 | Sachsen Leipzig | 0 | (0) |
| 2009–2017 | RB Leipzig | 27 | (0) |
| 2016–2017 | RB Leipzig II | 43 | (0) |
| 2017–2019 | Brøndby | 1 | (0) |
| 2019–2025 | Chemie Leipzig | 167 | (0) |
| Total | | 238 | (0) |
- * Club domestic league appearances and goals

Benjamin Bellot (born 30 July 1990) is a German former professional footballer who played as a goalkeeper.

== Career ==
=== Early years ===
Bellot began playing football at the age of five at SV Blau-Weiß Günthersdorf, before joining the youth ranks of VfB Leipzig until 2004 and then progressing through the youth and senior setup of Sachsen Leipzig. He later said that the move to Sachsen Leipzig had been driven by an ambition to reach professional football with a club from his home city.

=== RB Leipzig ===
Bellot joined RB Leipzig on its foundation in 2009, having moved across from Sachsen Leipzig, and was the only member of the original squad still at the club by 2014. He spent his first years as a reserve goalkeeper as the club rose through the German divisions, and remained a backup to Fabio Coltorti after Coltorti's arrival.

His first professional appearance came on the 24th matchday of the 2013–14 3. Liga, when, with Coltorti sidelined by a knee injury, fellow goalkeeper Erik Domaschke suffered a scaphoid fracture during a 2–0 win away at Rot-Weiß Erfurt and Bellot came on in his place. He retained the position during the closing weeks of the promotion run, conceding once in his first seven matches, before Coltorti returned for the end of the season; RB Leipzig were promoted to the 2. Bundesliga.

Bellot again deputised at the start of the 2014–15 season after Coltorti tore a knee ligament in pre-season on 22 July 2014. He kept clean sheets in his first two matches in the division, and by late September had conceded only three goals and remained unbeaten in 16 league appearances for RB across the Regionalliga, 3. Liga and 2. Bundesliga; his first competitive defeat came in a 2–1 loss at 1. FC Union Berlin. The run prompted the club to abandon a move for an additional goalkeeper, though Bellot returned to the bench once Coltorti recovered.

After RB Leipzig won promotion to the Bundesliga and signed goalkeeper Marius Müller, Bellot moved to the reserve team for the 2016–17 season, dropping to third choice and making appearances for the side in the Regionalliga; his only first-team involvement came as an unused substitute in a Bundesliga match against Darmstadt 98.

=== Brøndby ===
In June 2017, Bellot signed a two-year contract with Danish Superliga side Brøndby. He cited the presence of head coach Alexander Zorniger, under whom he had spent two and a half seasons at RB Leipzig, as decisive in his move.

Bellot served as understudy to Frederik Rønnow in 2017–18 and to Marvin Schwäbe in 2018–19, making six appearances in all competitions across his two seasons. His sole Superliga appearance came on 30 September 2018 against AC Horsens at Brøndby Stadium; he was sent off in the 72nd minute for a foul on Kasper Junker, and Horsens, having trailed to a Kamil Wilczek goal, equalised and then won 2–1 against the ten men.

Bellot was released at the end of the 2018–19 season.

=== Chemie Leipzig ===
On 6 July 2019, Bellot signed with Regionalliga Nordost club BSG Chemie Leipzig on a one-year deal, returning to his home city of Leipzig. He made his debut on 27 July in a 0–0 draw against FSV Wacker 90 Nordhausen. He went on to become the club's first-choice goalkeeper, twice extending his contract, in January 2022 and again in February 2024.

On 21 May 2022, Bellot started in goal in the Saxony Cup final against Chemnitzer FC, which Chemie lost 2–1 at the Stadion an der Gellertstraße in Chemnitz.

At the end of the 2024–25 season, Bellot was one of thirteen players to leave Chemie Leipzig. He retired from football after leaving the club.

== Personal life ==
Bellot is the nephew of Harald Bellot, a former goalkeeper who was Chemie Leipzig's goalkeeping coach from 2015 until January 2025 and thus worked with his nephew during the latter's time at the club.

After retiring from football, Bellot took a role at ARGO Residential, a housing company in Leipzig.

== Honours ==
RB Leipzig

- NOFV-Oberliga Süd: 2009–10
- Saxony Cup: 2010–11, 2012–13
- Regionalliga Nordost: 2012–13

Brøndby

- Danish Cup: 2017-18

Chemie Leipzig

- Saxony Cup runner-up: 2021–22
