= Arturo Vidal =

Chilean footballer (born 1987)

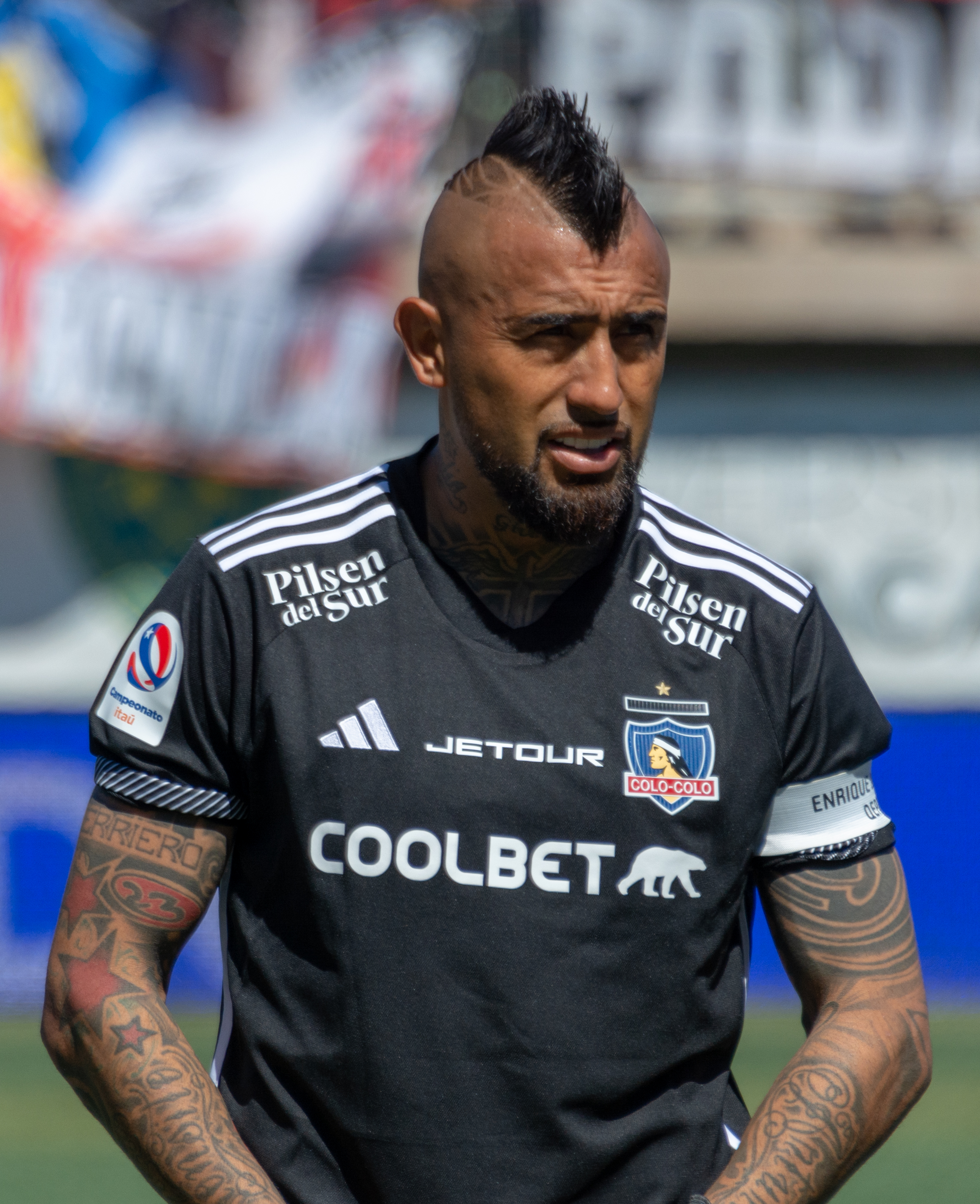
- Vidal with Colo-Colo in 2024

Personal information
- Full name: Arturo Erasmo Vidal Pardo
- Date of birth: 22 May 1987 (age 39)
- Place of birth: San Joaquin, Santiago, Chile
- Height: 1.80 m (5 ft 11 in)
- Positions: Defensive midfielder; centre-back

Team information
- Current team: Colo-Colo
- Number: 23

Youth career
- Rodelindo Román
- Melipilla
- Colo-Colo

Senior career*
Years	Team	Apps	(Gls)
2005–2007	Colo-Colo	36	(2)
2007–2011	Bayer Leverkusen	117	(15)
2011–2015	Juventus	124	(35)
2015–2018	Bayern Munich	79	(14)
2018–2020	Barcelona	66	(11)
2020–2022	Inter Milan	51	(2)
2022–2023	Flamengo	28	(2)
2023–2024	Athletico Paranaense	7	(0)
2024–	Colo-Colo	63	(10)

International career^{‡}
2006–2007	Chile U20	14	(8)
2007–	Chile	147	(34)
Medal record
Men's football
Representing Chile
Copa América
Winner	2015 Chile
Winner	2016 United States
FIFA Confederations Cup
Runner-up	2017 Russia
FIFA U-20 World Cup
Third place	2007 Canada
- * Club domestic league appearances and goals as of 23:50, 8 November 2026 (UTC) ‡ National team caps and goals as of 03:54, 6 June 2025 (UTC)

Arturo Erasmo Vidal Pardo (Spanish pronunciation: [aɾˈtuɾo eˈɾasmo βiˈðal ˈpaɾðo]; (Note: In isolation, Vidal is pronounced [biˈðal].) born 22 May 1987) is a Chilean professional footballer who plays as a defensive midfielder or centre-back for Liga de Primera club Colo-Colo and the Chile national team. His displays during his time at Juventus led him to be nicknamed Il Guerriero ("The Warrior"), Rey Arturo ("King Arthur") and La Piranha by the Italian press due to his hard-tackling and aggressive, tenacious style of play. He is regarded as one of the greatest Chilean players of all time.

Vidal started his career with Colo-Colo, where he won three Chilean Primera División titles. He relocated to Europe, where he joined Bundesliga club Bayer Leverkusen and played there for four seasons. He then moved to Juventus in 2011, where he became widely recognised as one of the best midfielders in world football. At Juventus, he won the Scudetti in all four of his seasons and also was integral for them in reaching the final of the UEFA Champions League in 2015. Vidal was part of a ten-man shortlist for the 2015 UEFA Best Player in Europe Award following his performances.

On 28 July 2015, Vidal returned to the Bundesliga, joining Bayern Munich and won three consecutive Bundesliga titles. After three years at Munich, he signed for La Liga giants Barcelona, where he won his eighth straight league title. In 2020 he returned to the Serie A to sign for Inter Milan, where he won yet another Serie A title and Coppa Italia. Following stints at Flamengo and Athletico Paranaense, Vidal returned to his boyhood club Colo-Colo in 2024.

Vidal has earned over 140 caps for the Chile national team since his debut in 2007, playing in the 2011, 2015, 2016, 2019 and 2021 Copa América tournaments, and helping his nation to victory in the 2015 and 2016 editions. He also participated at the FIFA World Cup in 2010 and 2014, and the FIFA Confederations Cup in 2017.

== Early life ==
Vidal was born in San Joaquín, a working class commune in the Chilean capital Santiago. His talent was noticed by his uncle, and he later joined the youth squads of local Primera División club Colo-Colo.

== Club career ==
=== Colo-Colo ===
Vidal's professional debut came in the first leg of the 2006 Torneo Apertura final against arch-rivals Universidad de Chile. Vidal came on as a late substitute for Gonzalo Fierro. Colo-Colo would go on to win the game 2–1 and win the championship as well. In the following season (Torneo Clausura) he became a more important part of the squad and would lead Colo-Colo to their second championship win in a row. Vidal scored three goals in Colo-Colo's Copa Sudamericana 2006 campaign. His good showing caught the eye of scouts from various European clubs.

=== Bayer Leverkusen ===
The 2007 Apertura Tournament was Vidal's last with Colo-Colo as he left for Bayer Leverkusen in the summer. Bayer had tracked his progress for some time and his good showing at the U-20 World Cup that year convinced Bayer Leverkusen director of football Rudi Völler to make the trip to Chile to convince the 20-year-old to sign. The two clubs then agreed on a fee of US$11 million with Bayer Leverkusen, paying $7.7 million for 70% ownership of his contract. His transfer broke the previous national record of Matías Fernández's $9 million transfer to Villarreal.

Vidal missed the first game of the season through injury but was soon thrust into the starting line-up and made his debut on 19 August 2007 in an 1–0 away loss against Hamburger SV. He scored his first goal for the club in a 3–0 win over Hannover 96 on 23 September 2007. He was ever present for the 2008–09 season and played a vital role in Bayer's run to the DFB-Pokal final. On 8 March 2009, he suffered a concussion during the game against VfL Bochum and was out for a month. Upon his return, he scored a goal to break the deadlock in the 4–1 semi-final win over Mainz 05 in the DFB-Pokal, but Bayer eventually lost to Werder Bremen in the final.

The 2010–11 season would be Vidal's last with Bayer. He helped the club to a second-place finish in the Bundesliga and topped the assist charts for his club with 11 assists, which was joint second in the league. He also contributed two goals in the club's run to the round of 16 of the UEFA Europa League.

=== Juventus ===
==== 2011–12 season ====
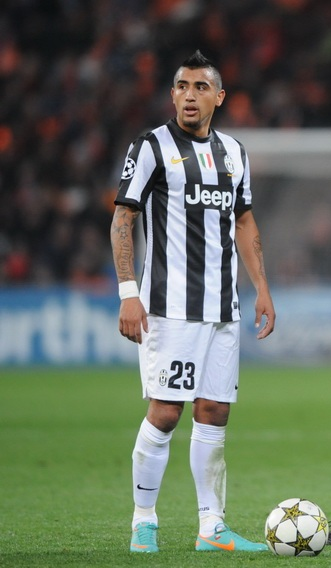
Vidal playing for Juventus in 2012

After a good 2010–11 season, Vidal was linked with various clubs, including Bayer's Bundesliga rivals Bayern Munich. On 22 July 2011, however, Vidal joined Serie A club Juventus for €10.5 million on a five-year contract. He made his competitive debut in the opening league game of the season against Parma on 11 September 2011, coming on as a second-half substitute for Alessandro Del Piero; he marked his first appearance with a goal six minutes after his introduction in Juventus' 4–1 win at the club's new stadium. It was initially speculated that he would compete with Claudio Marchisio for a spot alongside Andrea Pirlo, but Juventus manager Antonio Conte instead played all three effectively in a three-man midfield in his 3–5–2 formation. Vidal was an integral part of the 2011–12 Scudetto-winning side that went undefeated the entire season. He contributed seven league goals and three assists, including crucial goals against Napoli and a double against Roma.

==== 2012–13 season ====
Vidal began his second season with the club by scoring from a penalty in the 2012 Supercoppa Italiana on 11 August 2012, as Juventus defeated Napoli 4–2 in extra-time at the Beijing National Stadium. On 19 September 2012, Vidal scored his first UEFA Champions League goal in the group stage match away against the defending champions Chelsea. It was a crucial equaliser as Juve finished the game 2–2 after going two goals down in the first half. After helping the club to a second consecutive Serie A title, scoring 10 league goals in the process, and 15 in all competitions, he was voted Player of the Year by registered users on the club website juventus.com.

==== 2013–14 season ====
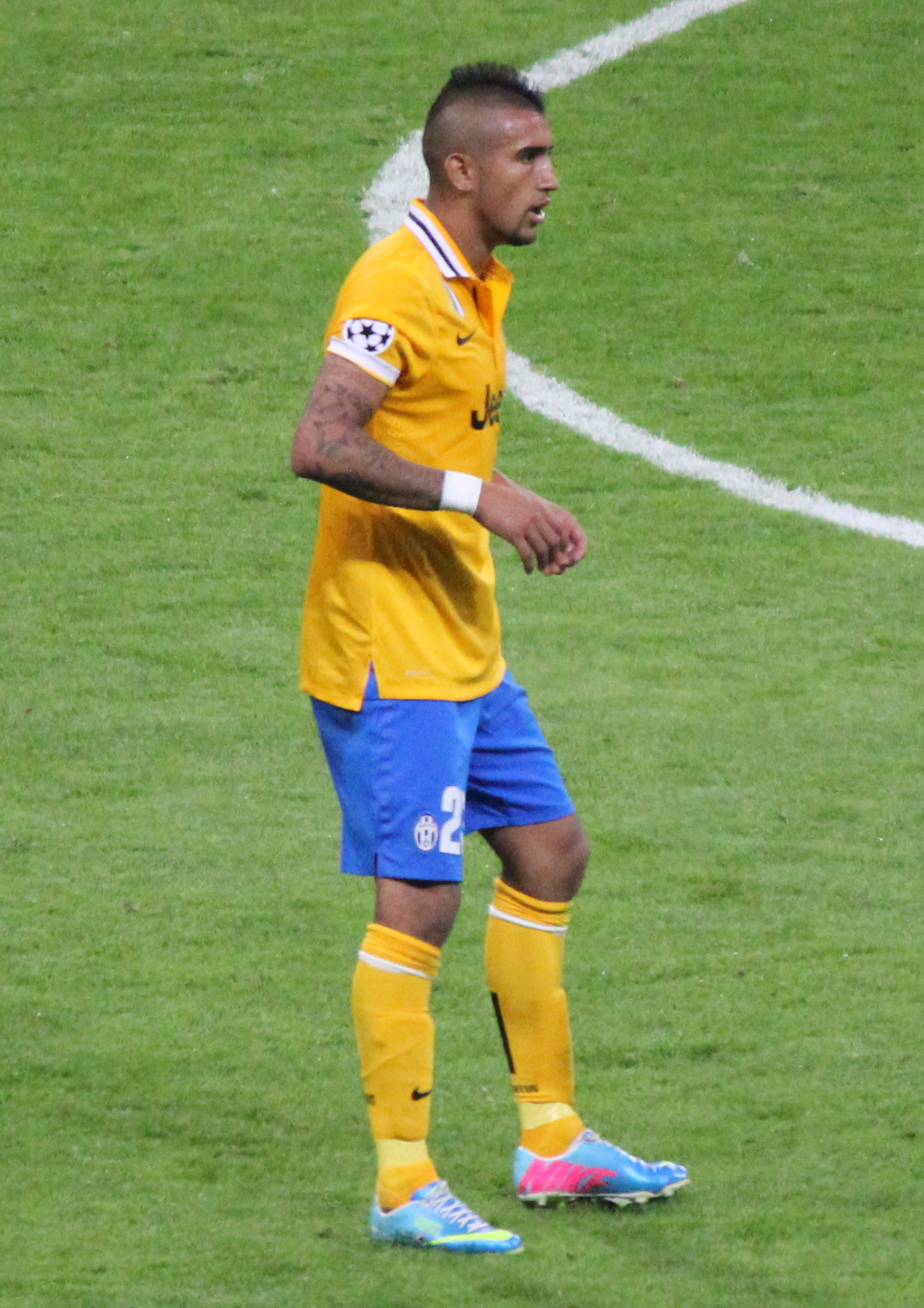
Vidal playing for Juventus in 2013

On 27 November 2013, Vidal scored a hat-trick against Copenhagen in the group stage of the Champions League, two penalties and a header. It was his first career hat-trick, and made him the first Juventus player to score three goals in a match in the Champions League since former Juventus player Filippo Inzaghi against Hamburger SV in 2000. He later renewed his contract with Juventus, keeping him at the club until 2017. On 27 February 2014, Vidal scored his first goal in the Europa League with Juventus, opening the scoring in a 2–0 win over Trabzonspor, in the second leg of the round of 16, and helping Juventus to the semi-finals of the competition. Vidal's offensive contribution increased that season, as he managed 11 goals in Serie A and 7 in European competitions, and he was one of the protagonists of Juventus' season as they won their third consecutive league title. His season finished prematurely, however, as he sustained a knee injury.

==== 2014–15 season ====
In his fourth season with Juventus, under manager Massimiliano Allegri, Vidal began to play a more advanced role; in addition to his midfield box-to-box role in a 3–5–2 or 4–3–3 formation, Vidal was deployed as an attacking midfielder, supporting the strikers in Allegri's 4–3–1–2 formation, and occasionally as a wide midfielder in a 4–4–2 formation. Vidal scored his first goals of the season by managing a brace in a 3–0 win over Cesena on 24 September 2014. On 30 November, in the Derby della Mole against local rivals Torino, Vidal opened the scoring from a penalty, and later assisted Juventus' second goal in a 2–1 win. On 14 April 2015, in the first leg of the quarter-finals in the 2014–15 UEFA Champions League, Vidal converted a penalty as Juventus defeated Monaco 1–0 at Juventus Stadium.

On 2 May 2015, Vidal scored the only goal of a 1–0 win at Sampdoria, confirming La Vecchia Signora as Serie A champions for the fourth consecutive season. On 20 May, he appeared in Juventus' 2–1 win over Lazio in the 2015 Coppa Italia final, as Juventus captured a domestic double and their tenth Coppa Italia title. On 6 June 2015, Vidal started for Juventus in the 2015 Champions League final as La Vecchia Signora was defeated 3–1 by Barcelona at Berlin's Olympiastadion.

On 15 July 2015, Vidal was part of a ten-man shortlist for the 2015 UEFA Best Player in Europe Award; on 12 August, it was announced that he placed eighth in the 2015 UEFA Best Player in Europe Award.

=== Bayern Munich ===
==== 2015–16 season ====
On 28 July 2015, Vidal returned to the Bundesliga, joining Bayern Munich on a four-year deal for a fee of €37 million plus up to €3 million in bonuses. Vidal made his debut for Bayern four days later in the 2015 DFL-Supercup against VfL Wolfsburg, as a 74th-minute substitute for Thiago. The match finished in a 1–1 draw; Bayern lost in a shootout where Vidal scored. Vidal scored his first goal from the penalty spot against FC Nöttingen in the fifth minute of Bayern's first round DFB-Pokal match. On 19 September, he scored his first league goal for Bayern in a 3–0 away victory over Darmstadt 98. On 26 November, Vidal was nominated for the 2015 UEFA Team of the Year. He scored two goals in both first leg and second leg of the Champions League quarter-final tie against Benfica which helped his side to go through to the semi-final.

==== 2016–17 season ====
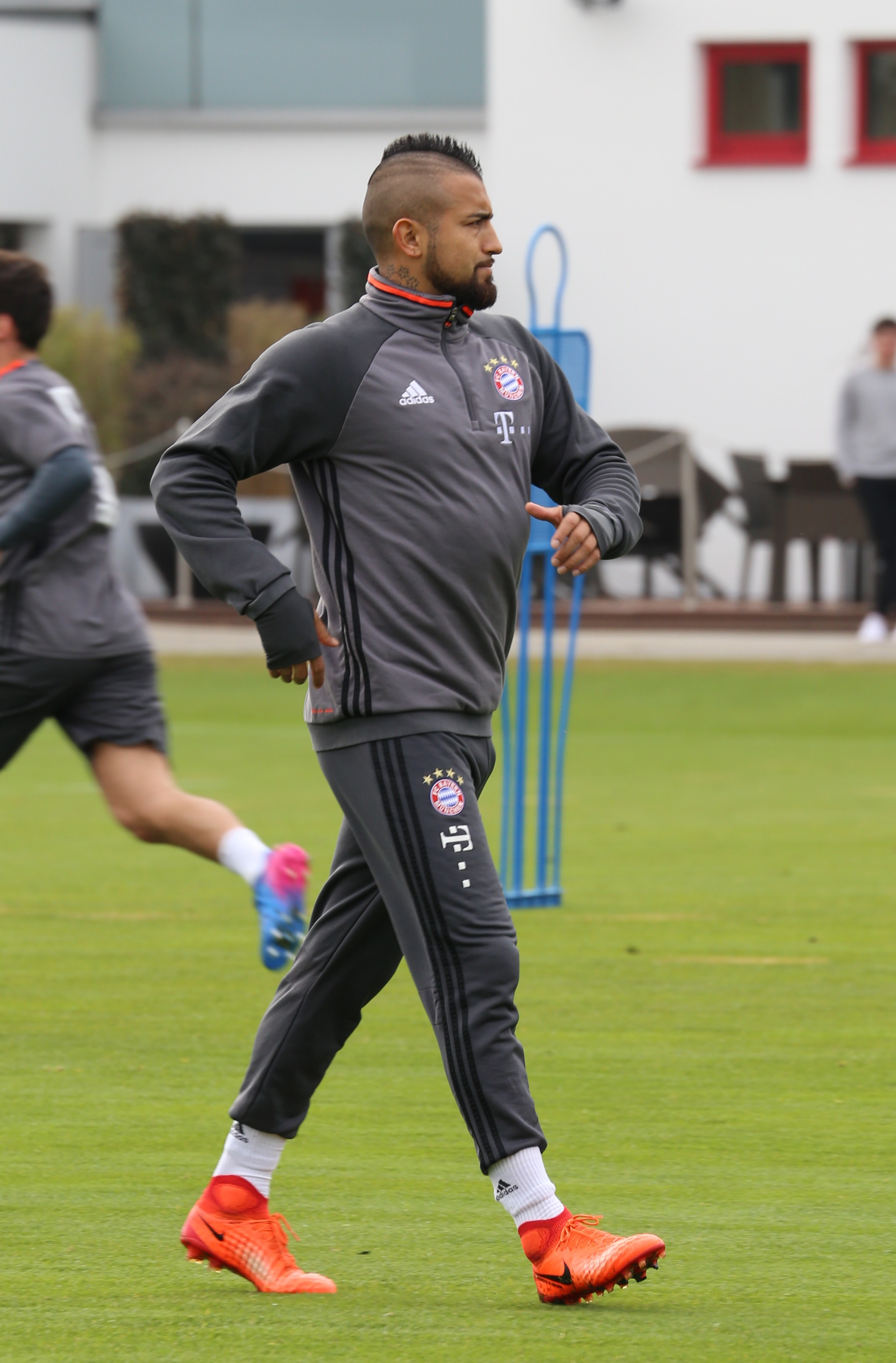
Vidal training with Bayern Munich in 2017

On 15 August 2016, Vidal scored the first goal of the 2016 DFL-Supercup match in a 2–0 victory over rivals Borussia Dortmund. He scored his first ever headed goal for Bayern in a 2–0 victory over Borussia Mönchengladbach on 22 October. On 8 March 2017, he scored two goals in a 5–1 away victory over Arsenal in the Champions League round of sixteen second leg match. On 12 April, he scored a header and also missed a penalty as his side suffered a 2–1 home defeat against Real Madrid in the Champions League semi-final first leg. In the second leg, he was sent off for receiving a second yellow card after a controversial tackle on Marco Asensio and his side were again defeated and knocked out of the competition by Real Madrid with a 4–2 loss. In the last game of the season, Vidal scored a goal in a 4–1 home victory over SC Freiburg and his side sealed a 25th win of the season and ensured they went a whole league campaign without a defeat at the Allianz Arena for the first time since 2008.

==== 2017–18 season ====
On 20 September, he scored his first goal of the season in a 3–0 away victory over Schalke 04. Vidal scored the only goal of the match in a 1–0 victory over Eintracht Frankfurt and it was his fourth goal in his last four appearances in the league. On 26 October, he made his 100th appearance for the club in a 5–4 victory on penalties against RB Leipzig in the DFB-Pokal second round match. Vidal suffered a season ending knee injury during training on 14 April 2018, and that was his last official match for Bayern. He underwent arthroscopic surgery and was expected back for the 2018–19 Bundesliga preseason.

=== Barcelona ===
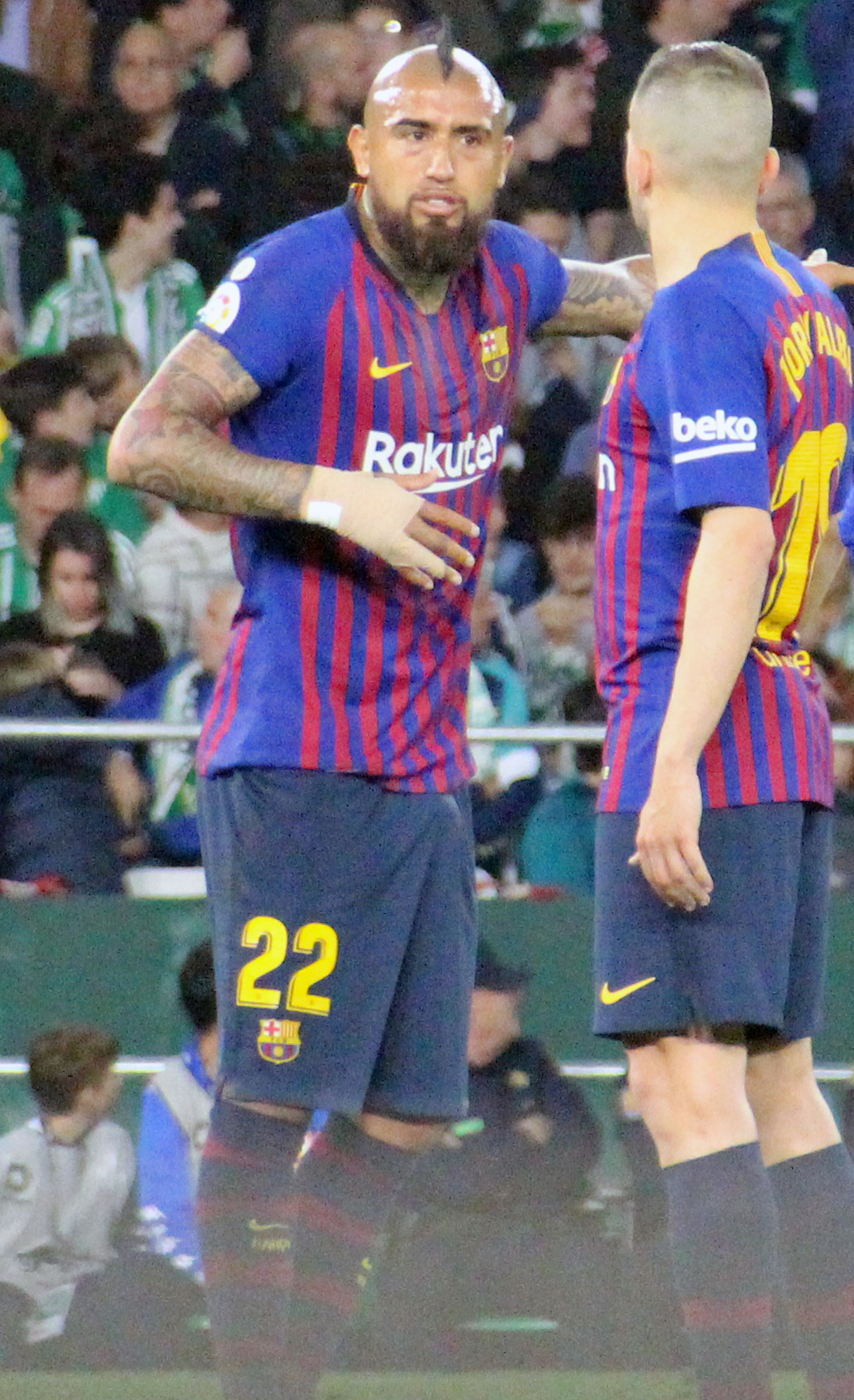
Vidal playing for Barcelona in 2019

On 3 August 2018, Barcelona announced an agreement with Bayern Munich for Vidal's transfer. He was officially presented as a Barça player and signed a three-year contract with the club on 6 August 2018. The paper Diario AS announced that the deal was reportedly worth 19 million euros, plus variables, and the paper Sport announced that the deal was reportedly worth 18 million euros, plus 3 million euros in variables. Even so, there was no statement by Barcelona about the transfer fee and the club's vice-president, Jordi Mestre, announced that the fee will not be disclosed at the request of Bayern Munich.

On 12 August 2018, Vidal made his debut for the club after coming on as a substitute in a 2–1 victory over Sevilla as his side won the 2018 Spanish Super Cup. On 28 October, Vidal came on as a substitute in the 84th minute of El Clásico. 3 minutes later, Vidal scored his first ever goal for Barcelona to cap off a 5–1 home win over rivals Real Madrid in La Liga. On 27 April 2019, he assisted the winning goal by Lionel Messi in a 1–0 win against Levante, to secure the La Liga title.

In the 2019–20 season, Vidal mentioned ahead of the Champions League match against his former club Bayern Munich in the quarter-finals: "Bayern will be playing against the best team in the world: Barca", then he added, "They aren't playing against some random Bundesliga team. It's going to be a proper football game. They better be ready for us, because we're looking forward to the challenge." However, the match ended with an 8–2 defeat to Barcelona, which was also his last appearance with the club.

At the end of the decade, Vidal became the best player in the world at recovering balls (tackler) and the highest scoring box-to-box player of the decade in the five major European leagues.

=== Inter Milan ===
On 22 September 2020, Inter Milan and Barcelona confirmed the transfer of Vidal for a fee of €1 million in variables. On 13 January 2021, Vidal scored his first goal for the club against Fiorentina in Coppa Italia from the penalty mark. On 17 January, he scored his first Serie A goal with Inter in a 2–0 win over his former club Juventus. On 11 July 2022, Vidal's contract with Inter was terminated by mutual consent.

=== Flamengo ===
On 14 July 2022, Vidal joined Flamengo on a free transfer. Vidal signed an 18-month contract which will see him at the club until December 2023. He scored his first goal with "Mengao" on 30 July, in a 4–1 win over Atlético Goianiense, in the 20th round of the Brasileirao. On 13 July 2023, Vidal's contract with Flamengo was terminated by mutual consent.

=== Athletico Paranaense ===
On 14 July 2023, Vidal joined Athletico Paranaense on a deal running until December 2023.

On 16 September 2023, Vidal suffered a bad injury to one of his knees, keeping him away from the football fields for a period of 3–4 months.

=== Return to Colo-Colo ===
On 22 January 2024, Vidal returned to Colo-Colo after seventeen years.

== International career ==
=== Youth ===
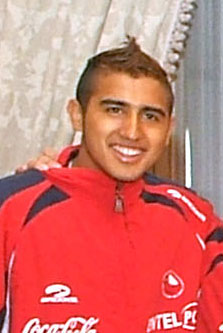
Vidal with Chile under-20

Vidal represented Chile at the Under-20 level at the 2007 South American Youth Championship in Paraguay where he was the tournament's second top scorer with six goals. During the tournament he played central midfield and helped the team to qualify for the 2007 FIFA U-20 World Cup where Chile finished in third place with Vidal scoring two goals in the tournament, including the match winner against Portugal in the round of 16.

=== Senior ===
==== 2010 World Cup, 2011 Copa América and 2014 World Cup ====
Vidal made his senior debut in a friendly against Venezuela, where Chile won 1–0. He became a regular under Marcelo Bielsa when fit during 2010 World Cup qualifying, playing in 11 matches and scoring a goal. He was then named in the final 23-man squad for the tournament and started in all four of Chile's matches as they were defeated by Brazil in the round of 16. Vidal went on to appear in all of the team's matches at the 2011 Copa América, scoring in the 2–1 group stage defeat of Mexico.

Vidal scored 5 times in 11 appearances for Chile as the team qualified for the 2014 World Cup. At the tournament, he started in three of the La Roja's four fixtures, including the penalty shootout loss to Brazil in the round of 16.

==== 2015 Copa América ====
On 11 June 2015, five days after appearing the 2015 Champions League final for Juventus, Vidal scored the opening goal of the 2015 Copa América from the penalty spot in Chile's 2–0 win over Ecuador at the Estadio Nacional in Santiago, having won the penalty himself when fouled by Miller Bolaños. In the team's next group fixture, Vidal scored twice – a header from a corner and another self-earned penalty – and set up another as the hosts drew 3–3 with Mexico on 15 June. In the final group game, a 5–0 win against Bolivia three days after his drunk driving charge, Vidal and Alexis Sánchez were rested by being substituted at half-time. On 4 July, in the 2015 Copa América final, Vidal scored from a penalty in Chile's 4–1 shoot-out victory over Argentina; in the final, he was voted Man of the Match, and was later named in the 2015 Copa América Team of the Tournament for his performances.

==== Copa América Centenario ====
On 10 June 2016, Vidal produced a man of the match performance, scoring both goals in a 2–1 win over Bolivia in Chile's second group match of the Copa América Centenario. He provided two assists in Chile's 7–0 victory over Mexico in the quarter-final on 18 June, but also received his second booking of the tournament for a foul on Jesús Dueñas in the 38th minute, which ruled him out of the victorious semi-final match against Colombia. In the final of the tournament, a repeat of the previous year's tournament, against Argentina, the match once again went to a penalty shoot-out following a 0–0 deadlock after extra-time. Vidal missed Chile's first penalty, but his nation won the shoot-out 4–2 to defend the title. Vidal was once again named in the Team of the Tournament for his performances.

==== 2017 FIFA Confederations Cup ====
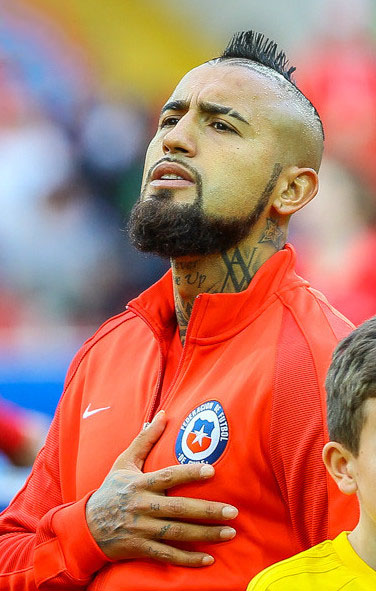
Vidal with Chile in 2017

On 18 June 2017, Vidal produced a man of the match performance in Chile's opening match of the 2017 FIFA Confederations Cup, scoring his nation's first goal in an eventual 2–0 win over Cameroon. He and his team made it through to the final, but were prevented from crowning champions by Germany for losing 1–0.

==== 2018 World Cup qualifying, retirement, and return ====
On 31 August 2017, Arturo Vidal announced that he could retire from the national team after he scored an own goal that resulted a 0–3 loss to Paraguay.

"Now they must be happy those tetchy [people] we have in our country!!! But don't worry, each time I'm closer to leaving."

— Arturo Vidal tweet

On 11 October, he announced his retirement from international football via of Twitter after losing 3–0 to Brazil in their last qualifier match and failed to qualify for the 2018 FIFA World Cup, but after just 24 hours he reversed his decision saying that he is a "warrior" who would "never abandon" Chile.

In a friendly against Denmark on 27 March 2018, Vidal and Jean Beausejour became the sixth and seventh players to make 100 appearances for Chile.

==== 2019 Copa América ====
In the quarter-finals of the 2019 Copa América against Colombia on 28 June, Vidal had a goal disallowed in regulation time by VAR for offside; following a 0–0 draw, he scored in the resulting penalty shoot-out to help Chile to a 5–4 victory and advanced to the semi-finals of the competition. In the third-place match against Argentina on 6 July, Vidal scored from a penalty once again in an eventual 2–1 defeat.

== Style of play ==
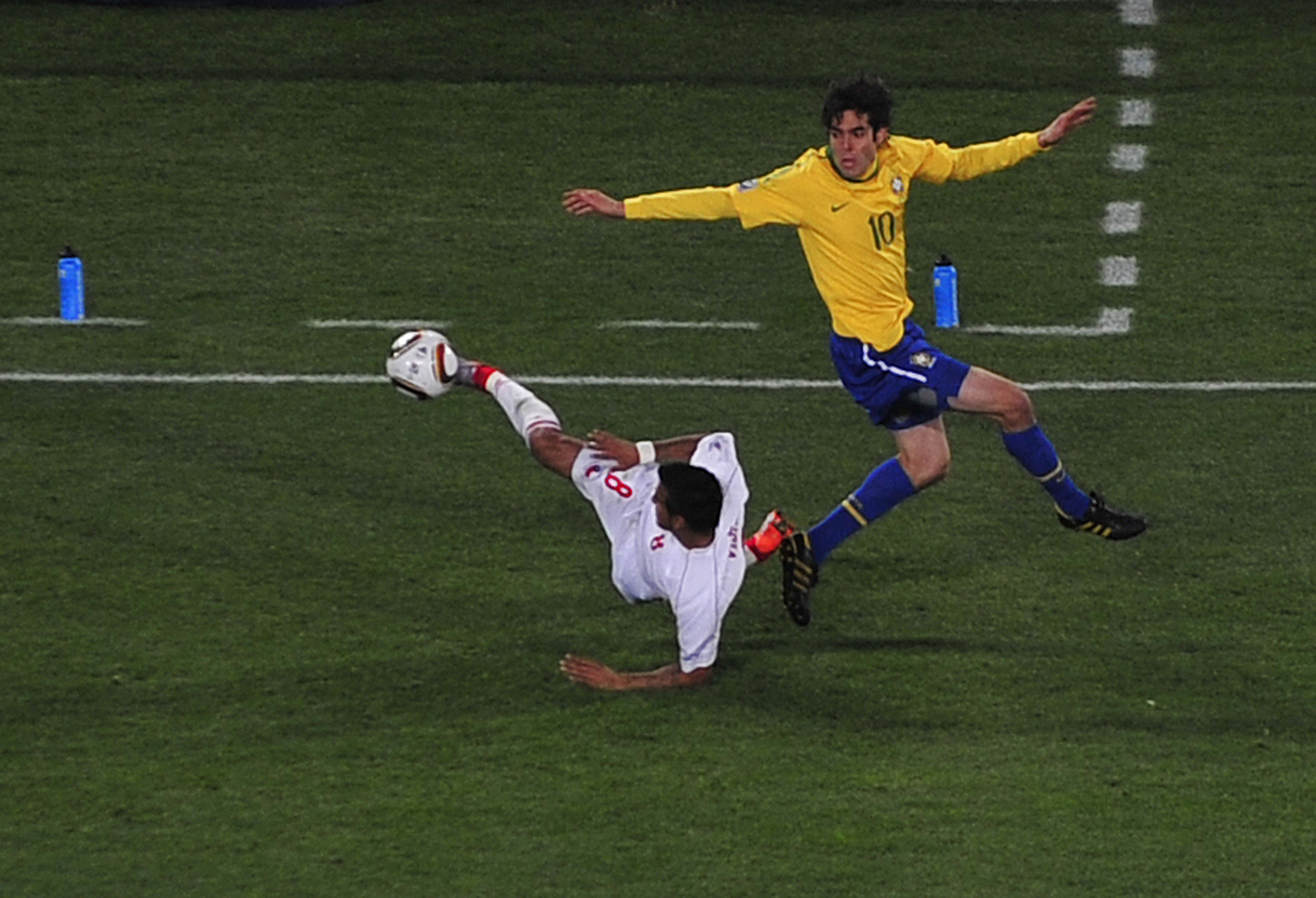
Vidal tackling Brazil's Kaká during the 2010 FIFA World Cup

A tactically versatile and hard-working player, Vidal is capable of playing anywhere in midfield, and in several different formations. He initially played in several different defensive and midfield roles in his early years, before eventually coming into his own in the centre, with Juventus, as either a "mezzala" or box-to-box midfielder, roles in which he is capable of assisting his teammates in both defence and attack. Throughout his career, he has also been deployed as a central defender, as a defensive midfielder, as an attacking midfielder, or even on the wing, due to his crossing ability. He is also capable of playing as a full-back or wing-back on either side of the pitch, while with the Chile national team, he has even played in a more advanced role on occasion, positioned as a centre-forward or striker, but effectively functioning as a false-9. He has also been used as a second striker, and as a false attacking midfielder on occasion.

It was these displays for Juventus that led him to be nicknamed Il Guerriero ("The Warrior"), Rey Arturo ("King Arthur") and La Piranha by the Italian press for his tackling and aggressive style of play. Vidal is a complete midfielder, known for his marking, positional sense, tackling, and anticipation, attributes which allow him to be effective at intercepting passes, winning back possession, and subsequently starting an attack. Having been the first-choice penalty shooter for Juventus, he is also an accurate penalty kick taker. Due to his strength and physical characteristics, as well as his ability to make late attack runs from behind into the penalty area, he is also effective in the air.

At Juventus, Vidal became an integral part of the Bianconeri alongside teammates Claudio Marchisio and Andrea Pirlo in the club's three-man midfield, and has made a name for himself as one of the best players in the world in his position; Vidal credited his development and maturity as a player to club legends Pirlo and Gianluigi Buffon. Vidal is also considered one of the most complete midfielders in the world due to his tackling abilities and his ability to support the team in both defence and attack at a high level. In 2013, Bloomberg ranked him the 11th-best player in Europe.

== Sponsorship ==
On 5 July 2013, EA Sports announced that they had featured Vidal on the Central and South American cover of FIFA 14, alongside global cover star Lionel Messi. The cover, however, would not be featured in the Brazilian version of the game.

== Personal life ==
On 16 June 2015, during the 2015 Copa América, Vidal suffered minor injuries when he crashed his Ferrari while under the influence of alcohol in Santiago. He left the hospital in a police car and was summoned to court to face charges for drunk driving. On 8 July 2015, Vidal was given a two-year driving ban, however he was allowed to continue playing in the Copa América that year.

His cousin, Gonzalo Vásquez, is a former footballer who is now an engineer.

Vidal's younger sister, Victoria, is married to fellow Chilean footballer Daniel Malhue, and they have a son.

In March 2020, Vidal and fellow Chilean footballer Gary Medel, donated to the Chilean Red Cross under an initiative to combat the COVID-19 pandemic in Chile.

In December 2024, Vidal graduated as a football manager at INAF (National Institute of Football, Sports and Physical Activity of Chile).

== Career statistics ==
=== Club ===
As of match played 8 November 2026

Appearances and goals by club, season and competition
Club	Season	League			National cup (Note: Includes DFB-Pokal, Coppa Italia, Copa del Rey, Copa do Brasil, Copa Chile)		Continental		Other		Total	
Club	Season	Division	Apps	Goals	Apps	Goals	Apps	Goals	Apps	Goals	Apps	Goals
Colo-Colo	2005	Chilean Primera División	2	0	—		—		—		2	0
Colo-Colo	2006	Chilean Primera División	19	0	—		12 (Note: Appearance(s) in Copa Sudamericana)	3	—		31	3
Colo-Colo	2007	Chilean Primera División	15	2	—		8 (Note: Appearance(s) in Copa Libertadores)	0	—		23	2
Colo-Colo	Total		36	2	—		20	3	—		56	5
Bayer Leverkusen	2007–08	Bundesliga	24	1	0	0	9 (Note: Appearance(s) in UEFA Cup)	0	—		33	1
Bayer Leverkusen	2008–09	Bundesliga	29	3	6	3	—		—		35	6
Bayer Leverkusen	2009–10	Bundesliga	31	1	1	0	—		—		32	1
Bayer Leverkusen	2010–11	Bundesliga	33	10	2	1	9 (Note: Appearance(s) in UEFA Europa League)	2	—		44	13
Bayer Leverkusen	Total		117	15	9	4	18	2	—		144	21
Juventus	2011–12	Serie A	33	7	2	0	—		—		35	7
Juventus	2012–13	Serie A	31	10	4	1	9 (Note: Appearance(s) in UEFA Champions League)	3	1 (Note: Appearance in Supercoppa Italiana)	1	45	15
Juventus	2013–14	Serie A	32	11	1	0	12 (Note: Six appearances and five goals in UEFA Champions League, six appearances and two goals in UEFA Europa League)	7	1	0	46	18
Juventus	2014–15	Serie A	28	7	4	0	12	1	1	0	45	8
Juventus	Total		124	35	11	1	33	11	3	1	171	48
Bayern Munich	2015–16	Bundesliga	30	4	6	1	11	2	1 (Note: Appearance in DFL-Supercup)	0	48	7
Bayern Munich	2016–17	Bundesliga	27	4	5	1	8	3	1	1	41	9
Bayern Munich	2017–18	Bundesliga	22	6	5	0	7	0	1	0	35	6
Bayern Munich	Total		79	14	16	2	26	5	3	1	124	22
Barcelona	2018–19	La Liga	33	3	8	0	11	0	1 (Note: Appearance(s) in Supercopa de España)	0	53	3
Barcelona	2019–20	La Liga	33	8	2	0	7	0	1	0	43	8
Barcelona	Total		66	11	10	0	18	0	2	0	96	11
Inter Milan	2020–21	Serie A	23	1	3	1	4	0	—		30	2
Inter Milan	2021–22	Serie A	28	1	5	0	7	1	1	0	41	2
Inter Milan	Total		51	2	8	1	11	1	1	0	71	4
Flamengo	2022	Série A	15	2	6	0	5	0	—		26	2
Flamengo	2023	Série A	6	0	2	0	5	0	12 (Note: One appearance in Supercopa do Brasil, two appearances in FIFA Club World Cup, two appearances in Recopa Sudamericana, seven appearances in Campeonato Carioca)	0	25	0
Flamengo	Total		21	2	8	0	10	0	12	0	51	2
Athletico Paranaense	2023	Série A	7	0	0	0	2	0	—		9	0
Colo-Colo	2024	Chilean Primera División	19	4	5	2	10	1	1 (Note: Appearance in Supercopa de Chile)	1	35	8
Colo-Colo	2025	Chilean Primera División	19	3	2	0	5	0	1	0	27	3
Colo-Colo	2026	Chilean Primera División	25	3	9	3	—		5 (Note: Appearances in Copa de la Liga (Chile))	0	39	6
Colo-Colo	Total		63	10	16	5	15	1	7	1	101	17
Career total			567	91	78	13	153	23	28	3	826	130

=== International ===
As of match played 5 June 2025

Appearances and goals by national team and year
National team	Year	Apps	Goals
Chile	2007	8	0
Chile	2008	6	0
Chile	2009	7	1
Chile	2010	7	1
Chile	2011	11	1
Chile	2012	5	1
Chile	2013	8	4
Chile	2014	10	1
Chile	2015	11	4
Chile	2016	13	7
Chile	2017	12	3
Chile	2018	7	3
Chile	2019	10	2
Chile	2020	4	4
Chile	2021	12	0
Chile	2022	6	1
Chile	2023	5	1
Chile	2024	2	0
Chile	2025	3	0
Total		147	34

Scores and results list Chile's goal tally first.

List of international goals scored by Arturo Vidal
No.	Date	Venue	Opponent	Score	Result	Competition
1.	5 September 2009	Estadio Monumental David Arellano, Santiago, Chile	Venezuela	1–0	2–2	2010 FIFA World Cup qualification
2.	17 November 2010	Estadio Monumental David Arellano	Uruguay	2–0	2–0	Friendly
3.	4 July 2011	Estadio del Bicentenario, San Juan, Argentina	Mexico	2–1	2–1	2011 Copa América
4.	2 June 2012	Estadio Hernando Siles, La Paz, Bolivia	Bolivia	2–0	2–0	2014 FIFA World Cup qualification
5.	7 June 2013	Estadio Defensores del Chaco, Asunción, Paraguay	Paraguay	2–0	2–1	2014 FIFA World Cup qualification
6.	11 June 2013	Estadio Nacional, Santiago, Chile	Bolivia	3–1	3–1	2014 FIFA World Cup qualification
7.	6 September 2013	Estadio Nacional, Santiago, Chile	Venezuela	3–0	3–0	2014 FIFA World Cup qualification
8.	11 October 2013	Estadio Metropolitano Roberto Meléndez, Barranquilla, Colombia	Colombia	1–0	3–3	2014 FIFA World Cup qualification
9.	14 October 2014	Estadio Municipal Francisco Sanchez Rumoroso, Coquimbo, Chile	Bolivia	2–2	2–2	Friendly
10.	11 June 2015	Estadio Nacional, Santiago, Chile	Ecuador	1–0	2–0	2015 Copa América
11.	15 June 2015	Estadio Nacional, Santiago, Chile	Mexico	1–1	3–3	2015 Copa América
12.	15 June 2015	Estadio Nacional, Santiago, Chile	Mexico	3–2	3–3	2015 Copa América
13.	12 November 2015	Estadio Nacional, Santiago, Chile	Colombia	1–0	1–1	2018 FIFA World Cup qualification
14.	29 March 2016	Estadio Agustín Tovar, Barinas, Venezuela	Venezuela	3–1	4–1	2018 FIFA World Cup qualification
15.	29 March 2016	Estadio Agustín Tovar, Barinas, Venezuela	Venezuela	4–1	4–1	2018 FIFA World Cup qualification
16.	10 June 2016	Gillette Stadium, Foxborough, United States	Bolivia	1–0	2–1	Copa América Centenario
17.	10 June 2016	Gillette Stadium, Foxborough, United States	Bolivia	2–1	2–1	Copa América Centenario
18.	1 September 2016	Estadio Defensores del Chaco, Asunción, Paraguay	Paraguay	1–2	1–2	2018 FIFA World Cup qualification
19.	11 October 2016	Estadio Nacional, Santiago, Chile	Peru	1–0	2–1	2018 FIFA World Cup qualification
20.	11 October 2016	Estadio Nacional, Santiago, Chile	Peru	2–1	2–1	2018 FIFA World Cup qualification
21.	2 June 2017	Estadio Nacional, Santiago, Chile	Burkina Faso	1–0	3–0	Friendly
22.	2 June 2017	Estadio Nacional, Santiago, Chile	Burkina Faso	2–0	3–0	Friendly
23.	18 June 2017	Otkritie Arena, Moscow, Russia	Cameroon	1–0	2–0	2017 FIFA Confederations Cup
24.	24 March 2018	Friends Arena, Solna, Sweden	Sweden	1–0	2–1	Friendly
25.	20 November 2018	Estadio Germán Becker, Temuco, Chile	Honduras	1–0	4–1	Friendly
26.	20 November 2018	Estadio Germán Becker, Temuco, Chile	Honduras	2–0	4–1	Friendly
27.	6 July 2019	Arena Corinthians, São Paulo, Brazil	Argentina	1–2	1–2	2019 Copa América
28.	15 October 2019	Estadio José Rico Pérez, Alicante, Spain	Guinea	3–1	3–2	Friendly
29.	13 October 2020	Estadio Nacional, Santiago, Chile	Colombia	1–1	2–2	2022 FIFA World Cup qualification
30.	13 November 2020	Estadio Nacional, Santiago, Chile	Peru	1–0	2–0	2022 FIFA World Cup qualification
31.	13 November 2020	Estadio Nacional, Santiago, Chile	Peru	2–0	2–0	2022 FIFA World Cup qualification
32.	17 November 2020	Estadio Olímpico de la UCV, Caracas, Venezuela	Venezuela	1–1	1–2	2022 FIFA World Cup qualification
33.	27 September 2022	Franz Horr Stadium, Vienna, Austria	Qatar	2–2	2–2	Friendly
34.	8 September 2023	Estadio Centenario, Montevideo, Uruguay	Uruguay	1–3	1–3	2026 FIFA World Cup qualification

== Honours ==
Colo-Colo

- Primera División de Chile: 2006-A, 2006-C, 2007-A, 2024, 2026
- Supercopa de Chile: 2024

Juventus

- Serie A: 2011–12, 2012–13, 2013–14, 2014–15
- Coppa Italia: 2014–15
- Supercoppa Italiana: 2012, 2013
- UEFA Champions League runner-up: 2014–15

Bayern Munich

- Bundesliga: 2015–16, 2016–17, 2017–18
- DFB-Pokal: 2015–16
- DFL-Supercup: 2016, 2017

Barcelona

- La Liga: 2018–19
- Supercopa de España: 2018

Inter Milan

- Serie A: 2020–21
- Coppa Italia: 2021–22
- Supercoppa Italiana: 2021

Flamengo

- Copa do Brasil: 2022
- Copa Libertadores: 2022

Chile

- Copa América: 2015, 2016
- FIFA Confederations Cup runner-up: 2017

Individual

- Bundesliga Team of the Season: 2010–11, 2015–16
- Best Chilean Player Abroad: 2011
- Juventus Player of the Year: 2012–13
- Serie A Team of the Year: 2012–13, 2013–14
- Goal Midfielder of the Season: 2012–13
- ESM Team of the Year: 2013–14
- Copa América Team of the Tournament: 2015, 2016, 2019
- Chilean Footballer of the Year: 2016
- Chilean Primera División Ideal Team: 2024
- TNT Sports Chile's Gala Crack - "Te Quiero Ver Campeón" Award: 2024

== See also ==
- List of footballers with 100 or more caps
