= Bernd Schneider (footballer) =

German footballer (born 1973)

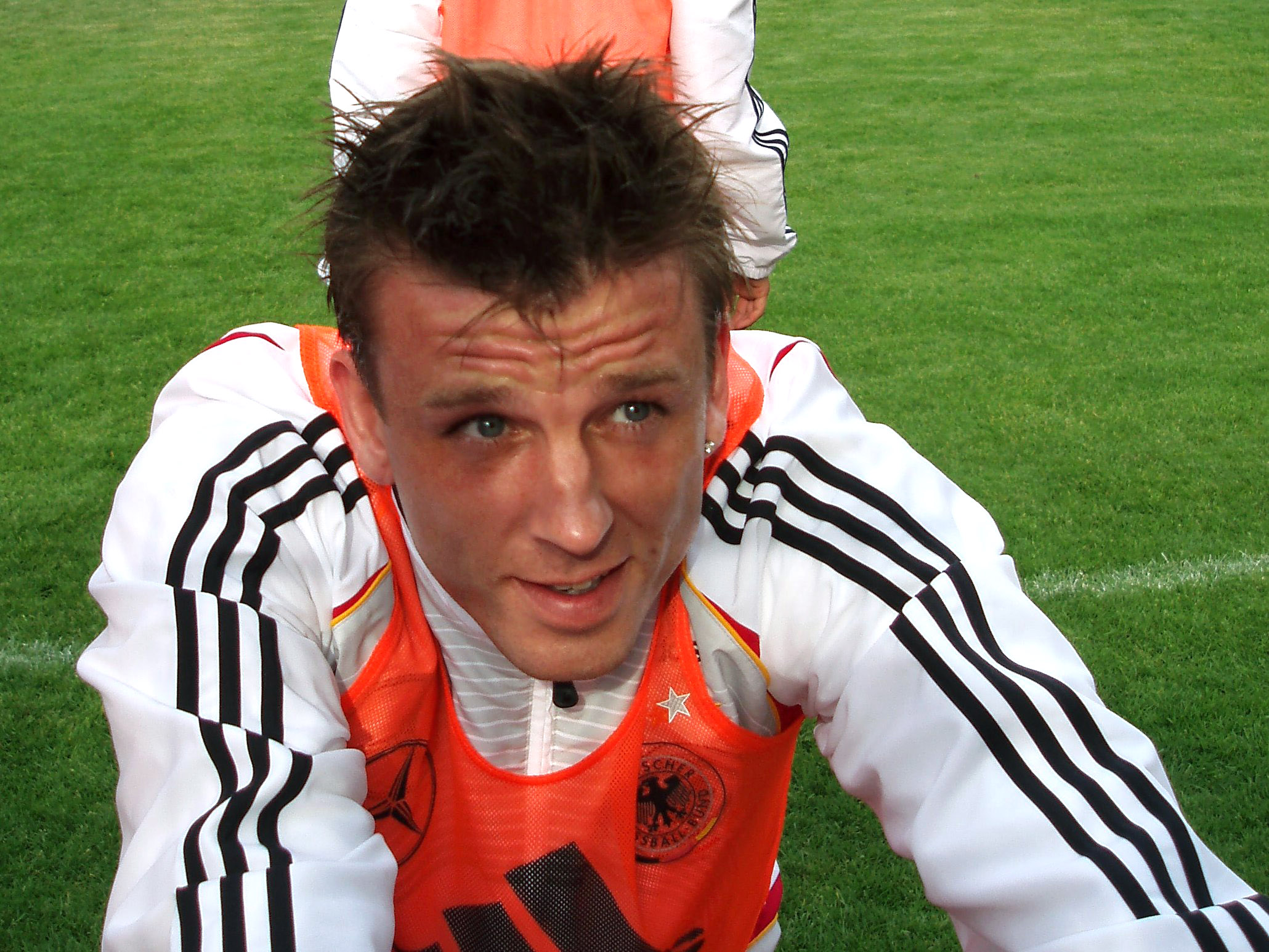
- Schneider training for Germany in 2006

Personal information
- Full name: Bernd Schneider
- Date of birth: 17 November 1973 (age 52)
- Place of birth: Jena, East Germany
- Height: 1.76 m (5 ft 9 in)
- Positions: Right midfielder; attacking midfielder

Youth career
- 1980–1983: BSG Aufbau Jena
- 1983–1991: Carl Zeiss Jena

Senior career*
Years	Team	Apps	(Gls)
1991–1998	Carl Zeiss Jena	158	(21)
1998–1999	Eintracht Frankfurt	33	(4)
1999–2009	Bayer Leverkusen	263	(35)
2009	Bayer Leverkusen II	8	(1)
Total		462	(61)

International career
	Germany U-18	2	(0)
1999–2001	Germany B	4	(1)
1999–2008	Germany	81	(4)
Medal record
Bayer 04 Leverkusen
Runner-up	DFB-Pokal	2002
Runner-up	UEFA Champions League	2002
Runner-up	DFB-Pokal	2009
Germany
Runner-up	FIFA World Cup	2002
Third place	FIFA Confederations Cup	2005
Third place	FIFA World Cup	2006
- * Club domestic league appearances and goals

Bernd Schneider (born 17 November 1973) is a German former professional footballer who played as a midfielder. After retiring in June 2009, he took up an advisory role at his first club, Carl Zeiss Jena, and a scouting position at Bayer Leverkusen.

Nicknamed Schnix by fans and teammates, Schneider started out at his hometown club Carl Zeiss Jena and made a name for himself during his decade-long stint at Bayer Leverkusen. He earned the nickname "The White Brazilian" for his dribbling and passing skills as well as his accurate free kicks and corners. Although mostly a provider of goals rather than a finisher, he was capable of scoring, especially from long distance. Schneider is notable for having multiple second and third place medals from national, continental and international tournaments (including the Bundesliga, UEFA Champions League and FIFA World Cup) without ever having won a major tournament.

== Club career ==
Schneider started his professional career at local Carl Zeiss Jena, going on to help the Thuringian outfit to stay five seasons in the second division; his debut came on 13 August 1991, playing close to ten minutes in a 1–3 loss at Darmstadt 98.

Schneider then played one season at Eintracht Frankfurt, subsequently moving to Bayer Leverkusen, and establishing himself as an essential player for both club and country. In 1999–2000 and 2001–02, he was instrumental in Bayer's runner-up league finishes, serving 11 decisive passes in the latter season, as well as netting five goals himself; he also appeared 19 times as the side reached the 2002 Champions League Final.

More a creator than a finisher, Schneider scored a career-best ten league goals in the 2003–04 season, making him the highest-scoring midfielder in that year's competition, alongside Johan Micoud; Leverkusen finished third and, during the following season, Schneider renewed his link for a further four years.

After two more seasons in which he scored ten goals and achieved 18 assists in 60 matches, Schneider began suffering consecutive injuries: first the calf, then the back, being sidelined almost the entire 2008–09 due to the latter. He only managed to return to action on 16 May 2009, playing the last 20 minutes of a 5–0 home win against Borussia Mönchengladbach. The following month, he announced his retirement after failing to fully recover from the injury.

On 29 May 2009, Carl Zeiss Jena named him as mentor to club president Peter Schreiber, and he began to work as scout for Bayer Leverkusen in June, immediately after retiring from play.

== International career ==
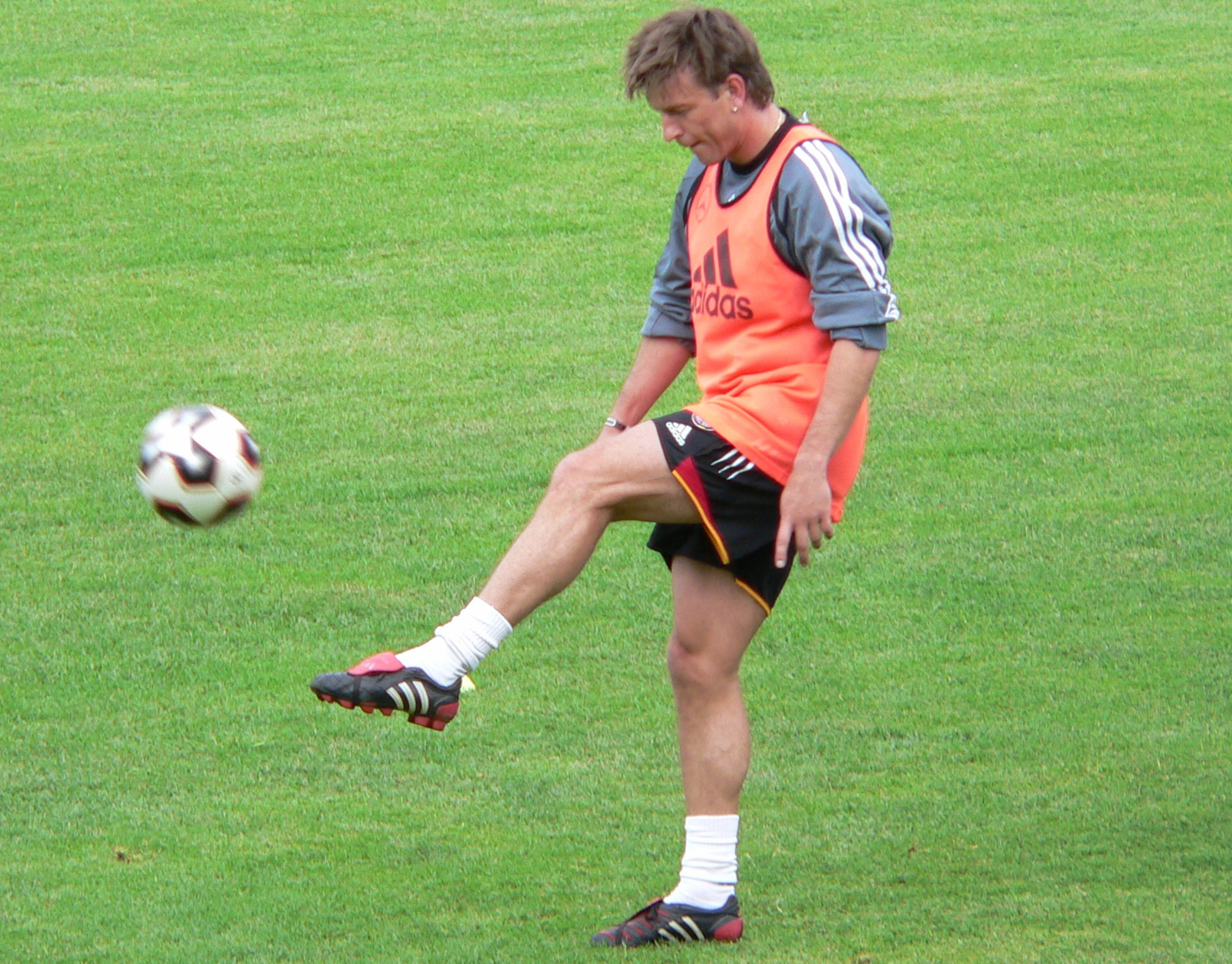
Schneider with Germany in 2005

Schneider made his debut for Germany during the 1999 Confederations Cup, playing in the 2–0 win against New Zealand and the loss to the United States (same result).

Since then, Schneider established himself as a vital squad member due to his work rate and versatility. He was ever-present at the 2002 World Cup, where he scored his first goal in their 8–0 thrashing of Saudi Arabia in the group stages, and at the Euro 2004. At the World Cup on home soil, along with Ballack, Torsten Frings and Bastian Schweinsteiger, they formed a formidable midfield and all played their part in the national team's unexpected success. He captained the team in their opening game against Costa Rica as Ballack was out injured. In the final group stage match, he was instrumental in Germany's 3–0 win over Ecuador which guaranteed them maximum points as group winners.

Schneider was ruled out of Germany's Euro 2008 squad due to surgery to fix a slipped disc. He retired with 81 caps for Germany.

== Personal life ==
Schneider and his wife Carina have a daughter, Emily, and a son, Giovani.

== Career statistics ==
=== Club ===
Appearances and goals by club, season and competition
Club	Season	League			DFB-Pokal		Europe (Note: Includes UEFA Champions League and UEFA Cup..)		Other (Note: Includes 2. Bundesliga playoff and German League Cup.)		Total		Ref.
Club	Season	League	Apps	Goals	Apps	Goals	Apps	Goals	Apps	Goals	Apps	Goals	Ref.
Carl Zeiss Jena	1991–92	2. Bundesliga	1	0	1	0	—		3	0	5	0	
Carl Zeiss Jena	1992–93	2. Bundesliga	21	0	3	0	—		—		24	0	
Carl Zeiss Jena	1993–94	2. Bundesliga	2	0	0	0	—		—		2	0	
Carl Zeiss Jena	1994–95	2. Bundesliga	34	7	1	0	—		—		35	7	
Carl Zeiss Jena	1995–96	2. Bundesliga	33	6	2	1	—		—		35	7	
Carl Zeiss Jena	1996–97	2. Bundesliga	31	1	0	0	—		—		31	1	
Carl Zeiss Jena	1997–98	2. Bundesliga	33	6	4	0	—		—		37	6	
Carl Zeiss Jena	Total		156	20	11	1	—		3	0	170	21	—
Eintracht Frankfurt	1998–99	Bundesliga	33	4	2	2	—		—		35	6	
Bayer Leverkusen	1999–2000	Bundesliga	32	3	0	0	8	0	2	1	42	4	
Bayer Leverkusen	2000–01	Bundesliga	31	2	3	0	7	1	—		41	3	
Bayer Leverkusen	2001–02	Bundesliga	30	5	6	2	17	2	1	0	54	9	
Bayer Leverkusen	2002–03	Bundesliga	28	2	5	1	10	3	—		43	6	
Bayer Leverkusen	2003–04	Bundesliga	33	10	3	0	—		—		36	10	
Bayer Leverkusen	2004–05	Bundesliga	33	3	1	0	10	0	1	0	45	3	
Bayer Leverkusen	2005–06	Bundesliga	29	4	2	2	2	0	1	0	34	6	
Bayer Leverkusen	2006–07	Bundesliga	31	6	2	1	12	4	—		45	11	
Bayer Leverkusen	2007–08	Bundesliga	15	0	1	0	7	1	—		23	1	
Bayer Leverkusen	2008–09	Bundesliga	1	0	0	0	—		—		1	0	
Bayer Leverkusen	Total		263	35	23	6	73	11	5	1	364	53	—
Bayer Leverkusen II	2008–09	Regionalliga West	8	1	—						8	1	
Career total			426	52	36	9	73	11	8	1	543	73	—

=== International ===
Appearances and goals by national team and year
National team	Year	Apps	Goals
Germany	1999	5	0
Germany	2000	0	0
Germany	2001	2	0
Germany	2002	14	1
Germany	2003	10	0
Germany	2004	14	0
Germany	2005	14	0
Germany	2006	16	2
Germany	2007	5	1
Germany	2008	1	0
Total		81	4

Scores and results list Germany's goal tally first, score column indicates score after each Schneider goal.

List of international goals scored by Bernd Schneider
No.	Date	Venue	Opponent	Score	Result	Competition
1	1 June 2002	Sapporo Dome, Sapporo, Japan	Saudi Arabia	8–0	8–0	2002 World Cup
2	16 August 2006	Veltins-Arena, Gelsenkirchen, Germany	Sweden	1–0	3–0	Friendly
3	6 September 2006	Stadio Olimpico, Serravalle, San Marino	San Marino	13–0	13–0	UEFA Euro 2008 qualifying
4	12 September 2007	Rhein Energie Stadion, Cologne, Germany	Romania	1–1	3–1	Friendly

== Honours ==
Bayer Leverkusen

- Bundesliga runner-up: 1999–2000, 2001–02
- DFB-Pokal runner-up: 2001–02, 2008–09
- UEFA Champions League runner-up: 2001–02

Germany

- FIFA World Cup runner-up: 2002, 3rd Place 2006
- FIFA Confederations Cup third place: 2005

Individual

- kicker Bundesliga Team of the Season: 2001–02, 2005–06
- UEFA Champions League top assist provider: 2001–02
