= 2004–05 Bayer 04 Leverkusen season =

Bayer Leverkusen
2004–05 season
- Manager: Klaus Augenthaler
- Bundesliga: 6th
- DFB-Pokal: Second stage
- Champions League: Round of 16
- Top goalscorer: League: Dimitar Berbatov (20); All: Dimitar Berbatov (26)
Home colours	Away colours

Bayer 04 Leverkusen played the UEFA Champions League after finishing in 3rd place in the Bundesliga in 2003-04 and advanced to the Round of 16 in a tough group with Real Madrid, AS Roma and Dynamo Kyiv. The best results were a 4-1 win against Bayern Munich in the Bundesliga and a 3-0 win against Real Madrid in the Champions League. Dimitar Berbatov was the season top scorer with 26 goals.

== Transfers ==
=== In ===
Pos.	Name	From
MF	(Germany) Paul Freier	(Germany) VfL Bochum
MF	(Switzerland) Tranquillo Barnetta	(Switzerland) FC St. Gallen
DF	(Brazil) Roque Júnior	(Italy) AC Milan
MF	(Poland) Jacek Krzynowek	(Germany) 1. FC Nuremberg
FW	(Ukraine) Andriy Voronin	(Germany) 1. FC Köln

=== Out ===
Pos.	Name	From
DF	(Brazil) Lúcio	(Germany) Bayern Munich
FW	(United States) Landon Donovan	(United States) Los Angeles Galaxy
FW	(Germany) Thomas Brdaric	(Germany) VfL Wolfsburg
MF	(Germany) Christoph Preuß	(Germany) VfL Bochum
GK	(Australia) Frank Juric	(Germany) Hannover 96
DF	(Sweden) Teddy Lucic	(Sweden) Häcken
FW	(Germany) Oliver Neuville (Note: Neuville was born in Locarno, Switzerland, but also qualified to represent Italy and Germany internationally through his mother and father respectively and made his debut for Germany in September 1998.)	(Germany) Borussia M'gladbach

== Players ==
=== First-team squad ===
Squad at end of season

Note: Flags indicate national team as defined under FIFA eligibility rules; some limited exceptions apply. Players may hold more than one non-FIFA nationality.

No.	Pos.	Nation	Player
1	GK	GER	Hans-Jörg Butt
3	DF	BRA	Roque Júnior
4	DF	BRA	Juan
5	DF	GER	Jens Nowotny
7	MF	BRA	Robson Ponte
9	FW	BUL	Dimitar Berbatov
10	MF	GER	Paul Freier (Note: Freier was born in Bytom, Poland, but was raised in Germany from the age of 11 and represented Germany at U-21 level before making his international debut for Germany in May 2002.)
11	FW	BRA	França
12	FW	UKR	Andriy Voronin
13	MF	GER	Daniel Bierofka
15	MF	TUR	Sezer Öztürk (Note: Öztürk was born in Velbert, West Germany, but also qualified to represent Turkey internationally and represented Turkey at U-15, U-16, U-17, U-18, U-19, U-20 and B level.)
16	MF	POL	Jacek Krzynówek

No.	Pos.	Nation	Player
17	DF	GER	Clemens Fritz
19	MF	CRO	Marko Babić
20	GK	GER	Tom Starke
22	GK	GER	René Adler
25	MF	GER	Bernd Schneider
26	MF	GER	Sascha Dum
27	MF	GER	Gonzalo Castro (Note: Castro was born in Wuppertal, West Germany, and represented Germany at U-21 level, but also qualified to represent Spain internationally through his parents and represented Spain at U-19 level before making his international debut for Germany in March 2007.)
28	DF	GER	Carsten Ramelow
29	DF	GER	Jan-Ingwer Callsen-Bracker
35	DF	ARG	Diego Placente
40	MF	GER	Timo Röttger

=== Left club during season ===
Note: Flags indicate national team as defined under FIFA eligibility rules; some limited exceptions apply. Players may hold more than one non-FIFA nationality.

No.	Pos.	Nation	Player
6	DF	SWE	Teddy Lučić (to BK Häcken)
8	MF	GER	Jermaine Jones (Note: Jones was born in Frankfurt, West Germany, and represented Germany at U-20, U-21 and B level before making his international debut for Germany in February 2008, but also qualified to represent the United States through his father and made his international debut for the United States in October 2010.) (on loan to Eintracht Frankfurt)
14	MF	GER	Hanno Balitsch (to Mainz)

No.	Pos.	Nation	Player
18	FW	TUR	Kenan Şahin (Note: Şahin was born in Cologne, West Germany, but also qualified to represent Turkey internationally and represented Turkey at U-21 level.) (to Energie Cottbus)
21	MF	POL	Radosław Kałużny (to Rot-Weiss Essen)
23	FW	USA	Landon Donovan (to LA Galaxy)

== Results ==
=== Bundesliga ===
7 August 2004 Matchday 1	Bayer Leverkusen	2–1	Hannover 96	Leverkusen
19:30	Bernd Schneider 49'; França 90'		Michael Tarnat 14'	Stadium: BayArena; Attendance: 22,500

15 August 2004 Matchday 2	VfL Bochum	2–2	Bayer Leverkusen	Bochum
12:30	Vratislav Lokvenc 28'; Christoph Preuss 69'		Dimitar Berbatov 62'; Andriy Voronin 87'	Attendance: 26,289

28 August 2004 Matchday 3	Bayer Leverkusen	4–1	Bayern Munich	Leverkusen
10:30	Dimitar Berbatov 21', 59'; França 52', 57'		Michael Ballack 84'	Stadium: BayArena; Attendance: 22,500

11 September 2004 Matchday 4	Mainz 05	2–0	Bayer Leverkusen	Mainz
10:30	Niclas Weiland 65'; Benjamin Auer 68'			Stadium: Bruchwegstadion; Attendance: 19,500

18 September 2004 Matchday 5	Bayer Leverkusen	2–2	FC Nürnberg	Leverkusen
10:30	Hans-Jorg Butt 76' (pen.); Dimitar Berbatov 80'		Sven Muller 23'; Diego Placente 69' (o.g.)	Stadium: BayArena; Attendance: 22,500

25 September 2004 Matchday 6	Stuttgart	3–0	Bayer Leverkusen	Stuttgart
10:30	Philipp Lahm 12'; Martin Stranzl 42'; Silvio Meissner 90' (pen.)			Stadium: Gottlieb-Daimler-Stadion; Attendance: 35,000

2 October 2004 Matchday 7	Bayer Leverkusen	3–0	Hamburger SV	Leverkusen
10:30	Jacek Krzynowek 10'; Juan 73'; Dimitar Berbatov 87'			Stadium: BayArena; Attendance: 22,500

16 October 2004 Matchday 8	Stuttgart	3–1	Bayer Leverkusen	Berlin
10:30	Gilberto 38'; Thorben Marx 52'; Marcelinho 79'			Stadium: Olympiastadion Berlin; Attendance: 47,152

23 October 2004 Matchday 9	Kaiserslautern	0–0	Bayer Leverkusen	Kaiserslautern
10:30				Stadium: Fritz Walter; Attendance: 34,843

27 October 2004 Matchday 10	Bayer Leverkusen	3–2	Arminia Bielefeld	Leverkusen
10:30	Andriy Voronin 50', 54', 77'		Delron Buckley 19'; Fatmir Vata 69'	Stadium: BayArena; Attendance: 22,500

30 October 2004 Matchday 11	Borussia Dortmund	1–0	Bayer Leverkusen	Dortmund
10:30	Ewerthon 41'			Stadium: Signal Iduna Park; Attendance: 78,000

6 November 2004 Matchday 12	Bayer Leverkusen	4–1	SC Freiburg	Leverkusen
12:30	Paul Freier 49', 88'; Jacek Krzynowek 53' Andriy Voronin 90'		Soumaila Coulibaly 29'	Stadium: BayArena; Attendance: 22,500

13 November 2004 Matchday 13	Werder Bremen	2–2	Bayer Leverkusen	Bremen
12:30	Miroslav Klose 19'; Nelson Valdez 72'		Andriy Voronin 51'; Dimitar Berbatov 54'	Stadium: Weserstadion; Attendance: 38,128

20 November 2004 Matchday 14	Bayer Leverkusen	0–3	Schalke 04	Leverkusen
12:30			Ebbe Sand 27'; Aílton 37'; Lincoln 71'	Stadium: BayArena; Attendance: 22,500

27 November 2004 Matchday 15	Hansa Rostock	2–2	Bayer Leverkusen	Rostock
12:30			Andriy Voronin 36'; Dimitar Berbatov 63'	Stadium: Ostseestadion; Attendance: 15,800

4 December 2004 Matchday 16	Bayer Leverkusen	2–1	Wolfsburg	Leverkusen
12:30	Andriy Voronin 46'; França 89'		Diego Klimowicz 4'	Stadium: BayArena; Attendance: 22,500

12 December 2004 Matchday 17	Borussia M'gladbach	1–1	Bayer Leverkusen	Mönchengladbach
14:30	Václav Svěrkoš 68'		Dimitar Berbatov 63'	Stadium: Borussia-Park; Attendance: 52,221

23 January 2005 Matchday 18	Hannover 96	0–3	Bayer Leverkusen	Hannover
14:30			Andriy Voronin 18'; Dimitar Berbatov 36'; Paul Freier 58'	Stadium: AWD-Arena; Attendance: 38,067

29 January 2005 Matchday 19	Bayer Leverkusen	4–0	VfL Bochum	Leverkusen
12:30	Jacek Krzynówek 28'; Andriy Voronin 31'; Robson Ponte 70'; Paul Freier 78'			Stadium: BayArena; Attendance: 22,500

5 February 2005 Matchday 20	Bayern Munich	2–0	Bayer Leverkusen	Munich
14:30	Roy Makaay 45'; Paolo Guerrero 68'			Stadium: Olympiastadion; Attendance: 45,000

13 February 2005 Matchday 21	Bayer Leverkusen	2–0	Mainz 05	Leverkusen
14:30	Paul Freier 64'; Jacek Krzynówek 69'			Stadium: BayArena; Attendance: 22,500

19 February 2005 Matchday 22	FC Nürnberg	3–4	Bayer Leverkusen	Nürnberg
12:30	Marek Mintál 29', 53'; Paolo Guerrero 68'		Dimitar Berbatov 2', 59'; Carsten Ramelow 32'; Jacek Krzynowek 79'	Stadium: Frankenstadion; Attendance: 18,000

27 February 2005 Matchday 23	Bayer Leverkusen	1–1	VfB Stuttgart	Leverkusen
13:30	Dimitar Berbatov 80'		Cacau 89' (pen.)	Stadium: BayArena; Attendance: 22,500

5 March 2005 Matchday 24	Hamburger SV	1–0	Bayer Leverkusen	Hamburg
11:30	Daniel Van Buyten 22'			Stadium: AOL Arena; Attendance: 43,959

27 February 2005 Matchday 23	Bayer Leverkusen	3–3	Hertha Berlin	Leverkusen
13:30	Robson Ponte 5'; Hans-Jorg Butt 12' (pen.); Andriy Voronin 84'		Marcelinho 24', 29'; Andreas Neuendorf 62'	Stadium: BayArena; Attendance: 22,500

19 March 2005 Matchday 26	Bayer Leverkusen	2–0	Kaiserslautern	Leverkusen
11:30	Callsen-Bracker 12'; Andriy Voronin 46'			Stadium: BayArena; Attendance: 22,500

2 April 2005 Matchday 27	Arminia Bielefeld	1–0	Bayer Leverkusen	Bielefeld
10:30	Radomir Dalovic 65'			Stadium: Bielefelder Alm; Attendance: 24,092

9 April 2005 Matchday 28	Bayer Leverkusen	0–1	Borussia Dortmund	Leverkusen
10:30			Sebastian Kehl 88'	Stadium: BayArena; Attendance: 22,500

16 April 2005 Matchday 29	SC Freiburg	1–3	Bayer Leverkusen	Freiburg
10:30	Alexander Iashvili 37'		Bernd Schneider 26'; Dimitar Berbatov 66', 83'	Stadium: badenova-Stadion; Attendance: 22,000

24 April 2005 Matchday 30	Bayer Leverkusen	2–1	Werder Bremen	Leverkusen
12:30	Jacek Krzynowek 3'; Marko Babic 37'		Miroslav Klose 38'	Stadium: BayArena; Attendance: 22,500

30 April 2005 Matchday 31	Schalke 04	3–3	Bayer Leverkusen	Gelsenkirchen
10:30	Lincoln 30', 37'; Ebbe Sand 41'		Paul Freier 23'; Dimitar Berbatov 56'; Andriy Voronin 64'	Stadium: Arena AufSchalke; Attendance: 61,524

7 May 2005 Matchday 32	Bayer Leverkusen	3–0	Hansa Rostock	Leverkusen
10:30	Dimitar Berbatov 27', 90'; Andriy Voronin 58'			Stadium: BayArena; Attendance: 22,500

14 May 2005 Matchday 33	Wolfsburg	2–2	Bayer Leverkusen	Wolfsburg
10:30	Miroslav Karhan 24'; Thomas Brdaric 30'		França 61'; Daniel Bierofka 86'	Stadium: Volkswagen Arena; Attendance: 24,771

21 May 2005 Matchday 34	Bayer Leverkusen	5–1	Borussia M'gladbach	Leverkusen
10:30	Dimitar Berbatov 41', 58', 61'; Andriy Voronin 59'; França 69'		Oliver Neuville 2'	Stadium: BayArena; Attendance: 22,500

=== Champions League ===
15 September 2004 Matchday 1	Bayer Leverkusen	3–0	Real Madrid	Leverkusen
15:45	Jacek Krzynówek 39'; França 50'; Dimitar Berbatov 55'			Stadium: BayArena

28 September 2004 Matchday 2	Dynamo Kyiv	4–2	Bayer Leverkusen	Kyiv
15:45	Diogo Rincon 30', 69'; Florin Cernat 74', 90'		Andriy Voronin 59'; Jens Nowotny 68'	Stadium: Valeriy Lobanovskiy

19 October 2004 Matchday 3	Bayer Leverkusen	3–1	Roma	Leverkusen
15:45	Roque Junior 48'; Jacek Krzynówek 59'; França 90+4'		Dimitar Berbatov 26' (o.g.)	Stadium: BayArena

3 November 2004 Matchday 4	Roma	1–1	Bayer Leverkusen	Roma
17:45	Vincenzo Montella 90'		Dimitar Berbatov 82'	Stadium: Stadio Olimpico

23 November 2004 Matchday 5	Real Madrid	1–1	Bayer Leverkusen	Madrid
17:45	Raúl 70'		Dimitar Berbatov 37'	Stadium: Santiago Bernabéu

8 December 2004 Matchday 6	Bayer Leverkusen	3–0	Dynamo Kyiv	Leverkusen
17:45	Juan 51'; Andriy Voronin 77'; Marko Babic 86'			Stadium: BayArena

22 February 2005 Round of 16	Liverpool	3–1	Bayer Leverkusen	Liverpool
16:45	Luis García 15'; John Arne Riise 36'; Dietmar Hamann 90'		França 90+1'	Stadium: Anfield; Attendance: 40,942; Referee: Kyros Vassaras

9 March 2005 Round of 16	Bayer Leverkusen	1–3	Liverpool	Leverkusen
16:45	Jacek Krzynówek 88'		Luis García 28', 32'; Milan Baros 67'	Stadium: BayArena

== Statistics ==
=== Top goalscorers ===
Name	Goals
(Bulgaria) Dimitar Berbatov	26
(Ukraine) Andriy Voronin	17
(Brazil) França	14
(Poland) Jacek Krzynowek	9
(Germany) Paul Freier	6
