= Gonzalo Vásquez (footballer) =

Chilean footballer (born 1988)

Personal information
- Full name: Gonzalo Aníbal Vásquez Pardo
- Date of birth: 11 January 1988 (age 38)
- Place of birth: Santiago, Chile
- Positions: Midfielder; forward

Youth career
- Colo-Colo

Senior career*
Years	Team	Apps	(Gls)
2007–2008	Colo-Colo	0	(0)
2008–2009	Unión Quilpué	–	(–)
2009–2010	Bayer Leverkusen	0	(0)
2009–2010	Bayer Leverkusen II	27	(3)
2011	Ñublense	6	(0)
2012	Barnechea	2	(0)
2014–2015	Deportes Pintana	3	(0)
2015	Lanexang United		
Total		38	(3)
- * Club domestic league appearances and goals

Gonzalo Aníbal Vásquez Pardo (born 11 January 1988) is a Chilean former professional footballer who played as a midfielder or forward.

== Career ==
Vasquez started his senior career with Colo-Colo. In 2011, he signed for Ñublense in the Chilean Primera División, where he made nine appearances and scored zero goals. After that, he played for A.C. Barnechea, Deportes Pintana, and Lanexang United.

== Personal life ==
He is the cousin of the Chile international footballer Arturo Vidal.

After playing in Laos, Vásquez returned to Chile to carry on with his studies and graduated as a Construction Engineer.
