= Erik Domaschke =

German footballer (born 1985)

Personal information
- Date of birth: 11 November 1985 (age 41)
- Place of birth: Leipzig, East Germany
- Height: 1.88 m (6 ft 2 in)
- Position: Goalkeeper

Team information
- Current team: SV Meppen (goalkeeping coach)

Youth career
- –2004: VfB Leipzig

Senior career*
Years	Team	Apps	(Gls)
2004–2006	FC Sachsen Leipzig	1	(0)
2006–2009	Bayer Leverkusen II	51	(0)
2006–2009	Bayer Leverkusen	0	(0)
2009–2011	SV Wehen Wiesbaden	31	(0)
2009–2011	SV Wehen Wiesbaden II	20	(0)
2011–2012	KSV Hessen Kassel	29	(0)
2012–2014	RB Leipzig	10	(0)
2012–2015	RB Leipzig II	16	(0)
2015–2017	Rot-Weiß Erfurt	17	(0)
2017–2024	SV Meppen	176	(0)
Total		351	(0)

International career
2005	Germany U20	1	(0)
- * Club domestic league appearances and goals

Erik Domaschke (born 11 November 1985) is a German professional football coach and a former goalkeeper who is the goalkeeping coach for SV Meppen.

== Club career ==
Domaschke played in the youth department of VfB Leipzig until 2004. After the club's bankruptcy and the subsequent dissolution of the club, he moved to city rivals FC Sachsen Leipzig. As a backup goalkeeper behind René Twardzik, he only came to one appearance in the NOFV-Oberliga Süd in two years.

In 2006, Domaschke moved to Bayer Leverkusen for €40,000. He moved up from the second team to become the first team's third goalkeeper for the 2007–08 season, as Hans-Jörg Butt had left the club. Until the summer of 2009 he was regularly used in the reserve team.

For the 2009–10 season, Domaschke moved to the third division club SV Wehen Wiesbaden. He made his 3. Liga debut on 23 August 2009 against VfB Stuttgart II and acted as the starting goalkeeper from then on. In the 2010–11 season he lost this place to Wiesbaden newcomer Michael Gurski and was only used in three games when Gurski was out with a suspension.

In 2011, Domaschke moved to KSV Hessen Kassel on a free transfer, where he made his debut on the first matchday of the Regionalliga Süd against SC Freiburg II when he was put in the starting line-up by coach Christian Hock.

Ahead of the 2012–13 season, Domaschke's contract in Kassel was not extended and he was initially without a club until the beginning of October 2012. He finally completed a trial training at hometown club RB Leipzig and was committed to the goalkeeper position due to injury problems. He signed a contract until the end of 2012. He made his competitive debut for RB Leipzig on 13 October 2012 in the Saxony Cup round of 16 against SV Einheit Kamenz. In January 2013, Domaschke's contract was initially extended to the end of the 2012–13 season, which was then further extended until June 2015. In the 2012–13 Regionalliga season, Domaschke played two league games for RB Leipzig and won promotion at the end of the season to the 3. Liga. In addition, he won the Saxony Cup with the club, where he was used in the round of 16 and quarter-finals.

In the following 3. Liga season Domaschke was reserve goalkeeper – alongside Benjamin Bellot – behind Fabio Coltorti. On the 17th matchday against Hansa Rostock, Coltorti tore his knee ligament early in the game and Domaschke was substituted on. In addition to this, he completed the remaining four games until the winter break. Even at the beginning of the second half of the season, coach Alexander Zorniger relied on him as the starter. On matchday 24, his eighth game of the season, Domaschke suffered a scaphoid fracture during the game away against FC Rot-Weiß Erfurt and he was replaced by Bellot. Without making any further appearances, Domaschke reached second place in the league table with the team and thus won promotion to the 2. Bundesliga.

For the 2015–16 season, Domaschke moved to Rot-Weiß Erfurt in the 3. Liga. From there, he moved to the newly promoted SV Meppen for the 2017–18 season.

== International career ==
In 2005, Domaschke completed a game for the Germany U20 team under the then under-20 national coach Michael Skibbe. At the 2005 FIFA World Youth Championship in the Netherlands, he was included in the squad as the third goalkeeper behind René Adler and Philipp Tschauner.

== Honours ==
RB Leipzig

- Regionalliga Nordost: 2012–13
- Saxony Cup: 2013

Rot-Weiß Erfurt

- Thuringian Cup: 2017
