= Gonzalo E. Vazquez =

Venezuelan investment banker

Gonzalo E. Vázquez is a Venezuelan investment banker and founder of Vazas & Company, a financial advisory firm in Latin America.

== Education ==
Gonzalo E. Vázquez earned a BA in Economics from Southern Illinois University in 1984. He later attended Instituto de Estudios Superiores de Administración (IESA) in Caracas, Venezuela, where he completed the Advanced Corporate Finance Program (1986). Vázquez subsequently obtained a MA and Ph.D. from the University of Miami, in the field of International Political Economy.

== Published works ==
Vázquez's academic work has focused on migration, Venezuela's petroleum industry, and Venezuelan politics. In 2012, Vázquez published An Evaluation of Brain Drain in the Case of the Venezuela's Petroleum Company, a University of Miami thesis. That was followed in Spring 2013 by Brain Drain from Venezuela’s Petroleum Giant, PDVSA, examining the historical context and social forces that shape the emigration of professionals from Venezuela’s government-owned oil company, Petróleos de Venezuela, S.A., (PDVSA), from 1999 to the 2013.

In 2015 Vázquez contributed a chapter to The Impact of Emerging Economies on Global Energy and the Environment, titled 25 Years of Contemporary History of PDVSA: Killing the Goose that Lays the Golden Eggs. In November 2019, Vázquez’s Ph.D. dissertation at the University of Miami Bolivarian Authoritarianism: Regime Change in Venezuela Under Hugo Chávez was published.
