= René Adler =

German footballer

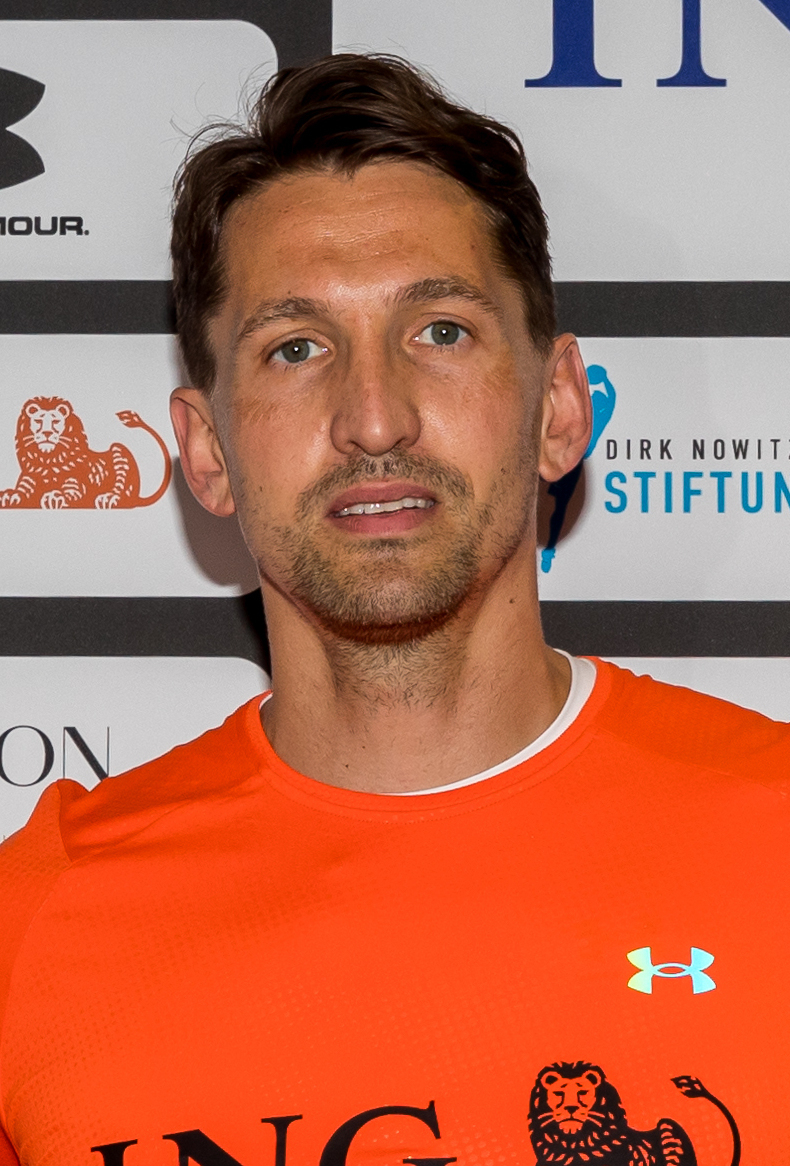
- Adler in 2022

Personal information
- Date of birth: 15 January 1985 (age 41)
- Place of birth: Leipzig, East Germany
- Height: 1.91 m (6 ft 3 in)
- Position: Goalkeeper

Youth career
- 1991–2000: VfB Leipzig
- 2000–2003: Bayer Leverkusen

Senior career*
| Years | Team | Apps | (Gls) |
| 2002–2006 | Bayer Leverkusen II | 30 | (0) |
| 2006–2012 | Bayer Leverkusen | 138 | (0) |
| 2012–2017 | Hamburger SV | 117 | (0) |
| 2017–2019 | Mainz 05 | 14 | (0) |
| Total | | 299 | (0) |

International career
| 2000–2001 | Germany U15 | 7 | (0) |
| 2001–2002 | Germany U17 | 15 | (0) |
| 2002–2003 | Germany U18 | 6 | (0) |
| 2003–2004 | Germany U19 | 9 | (0) |
| 2004–2005 | Germany U20 | 8 | (0) |
| 2005 | Germany U21 | 4 | (0) |
| 2008–2013 | Germany | 12 | (0) |
- * Club domestic league appearances and goals

René Adler (born 15 January 1985) is a German former professional footballer who played as a goalkeeper, mainly for Bayer Leverkusen and Hamburg.

== Early life ==
The cousin of Adler is Israeli-American professional lacrosse player Max Adler.

== Club career ==
=== VfB Leipzig ===
Adler started at age six playing for VfB Leipzig's youth side. After nine years for Leipzig, Adler joined the youth system of Bayer 04 Leverkusen in 2000.

=== Bayer 04 Leverkusen ===
After serving the youth system, Adler joined the B team in 2002. He made eight appearances for the B team in the 2002–03 season. At the beginning of the 2003–04 season he became part of the club's first team, which played in the Bundesliga. Nevertheless, he didn't make an appearance and continued to play for the second team. He also failed to make any first team appearances during the 2004–05 and 2005–06 seasons. However, in the 2005–06 Regionalliga season, he made 19 appearances for the B team. In May 2006 he sustained a rib craze, which led to a surgery in which his rib was strengthened. Because of his injury Adler had to pause until February 2007.

He made his Bundesliga debut in dramatic fashion on 25 February 2007 against league leaders Schalke 04. With starting goalkeeper Hans-Jörg Butt serving a suspension following a red card, Adler saved ten shots on goal, repelling Schalke's repeated attacks. A breakaway goal by Stefan Kießling in the 85th minute gave Leverkusen a 1–0 upset victory. Leverkusen manager Michael Skibbe praised Adler's "world-class saves". He stopped Schalke's record of 13 games unbeaten, VfB Stuttgart's record of five games unbeaten and Hamburger SV's four-game winning spree with a saved penalty kick against Rafael van der Vaart. He ended up making 15 appearances in all competitions for the first team and two appearances for the B team. On 8 March 2008 Adler made his first international appearance, losing the UEFA Cup round of last 16 first leg against RC Lens. He finished the 2007–08 season with 44 appearances in all competitions for the first team.

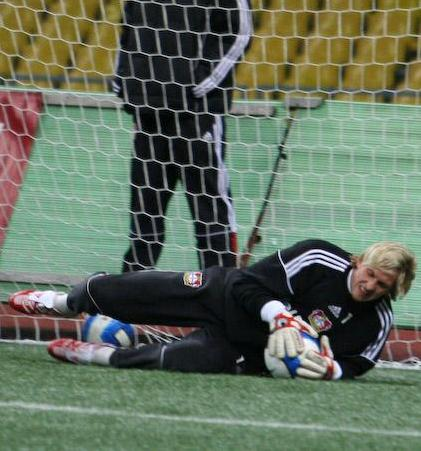
Adler with Bayer Leverkusen in 2007

In the following years, Adler continued to be the first-choice goalkeeper until newly signed Bernd Leno took his place due to injuries. He had made 37 appearances in the 2008–09 season, 33 appearances in 2009–10 season, and 44 appearances in the 2010–11 season. Previously, Leverkusen wanted to renew his contract but Adler rejected those offers. In summer 2012, Adler left the club for a free transfer after twelve years with Leverkusen. He had only made 2 B team appearances during the 2011–12 season.

=== Hamburger SV ===
Adler signed a five-year contract at Bundesliga rivals Hamburger SV in 2012. He debuted in a 4–2 loss to Karlsruher SC in the German Cup. He finished the 2012–13 season with 33 appearances. He finished the 2013–14 season with 33 appearances. He finished the 2014–15 season with 15 appearances. He finished the 2015–16 season with 25 appearances.

In May 2017, Adler announced that he would not extend his contract with Hamburger SV and leave the club after five years.

=== Mainz 05 ===
In July 2017, Adler joined 1. FSV Mainz 05.

=== Retirement ===
On 1 May 2019, he announced his retirement following the 2018–19 season. Overall he appeared in 269 German top-flight matches.

== International career ==
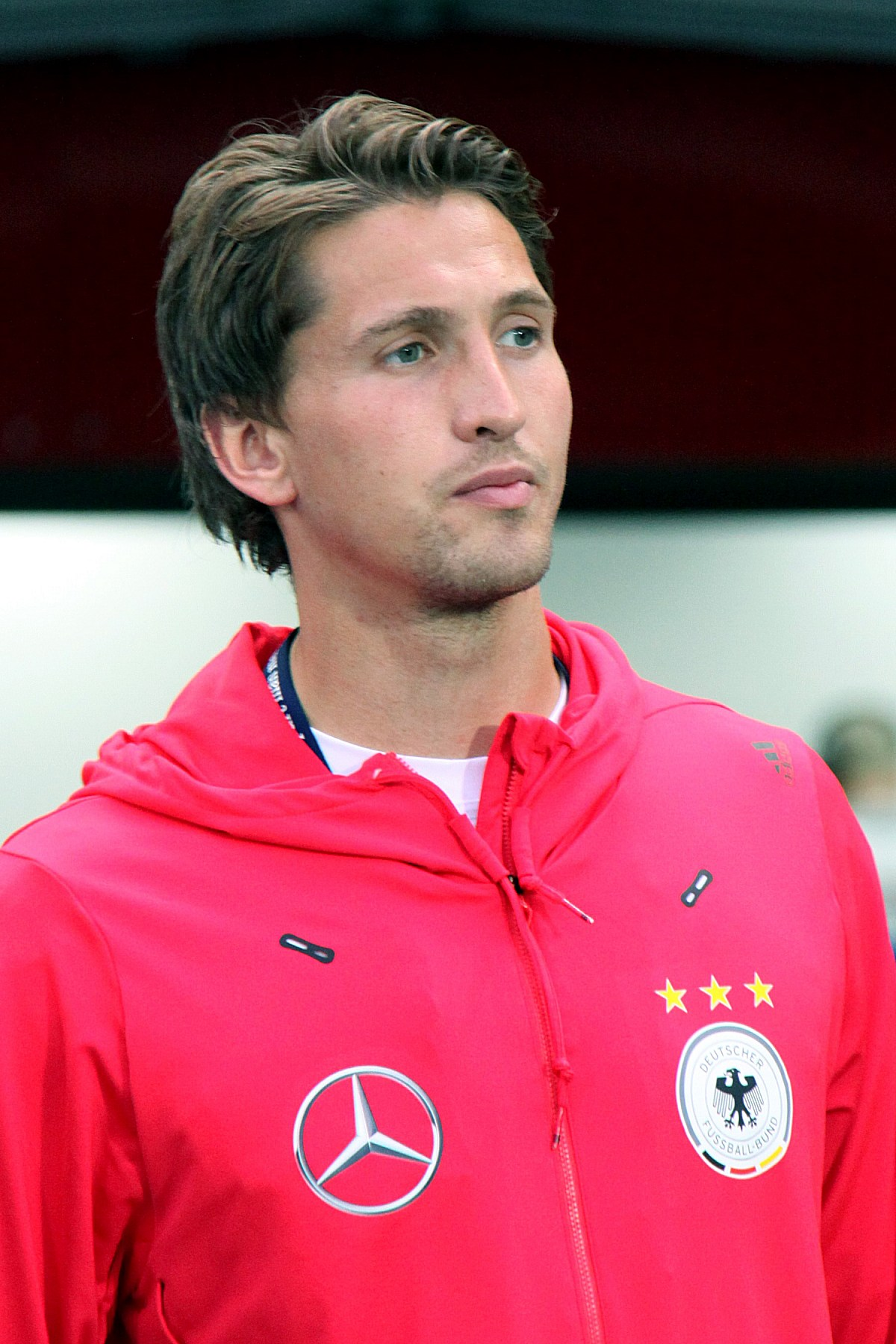
Adler with Germany in 2011

Adler has been a club captain at all levels of competition and at the German Under-19 championships he was one of the star players of the tournament.

Adler has made four appearances for the German U-21 team under the leadership of Dieter Eilts. He was part of the German team that finished as runners-up in Euro 2008. After the retirement of Jens Lehmann and death of Robert Enke, he became first choice during the World Cup qualifying. He made his debut for Germany on 11 October 2008 in a World Cup qualifier against Russia. Despite having been confirmed as Germany's main team goalkeeper for the World Cup, a serious rib injury prevented him from travelling to South Africa. He was out of contention for the national team for two years, but was recalled in November 2012 for a friendly against the Netherlands after putting in impressive performances since joining Hamburger SV. However, Adler was not selected for the German squad for World Cup 2014. Between 2008 and 2013 he won 12 caps.

== Career statistics ==
=== Club ===
Appearances and goals by club, season and competition
| Club | Season | League | | | Cup^{1} | | Continental^{2} | | Other^{3} | | Total | | Ref. |
| Club | Season | League | Apps | Goals | Apps | Goals | Apps | Goals | Apps | Goals | Apps | Goals | Ref. |
|---|---|---|---|---|---|---|---|---|---|---|---|---|---|
| Bayer Leverkusen II | 2002–03 | Regionalliga Nord | 8 | 0 | — | | — | | — | | 8 | 0 | |
| Bayer Leverkusen II | 2005–06 | Regionalliga Nord | 19 | 0 | — | | — | | — | | 19 | 0 | |
| Bayer Leverkusen II | 2006–07 | Regionalliga Nord | 1 | 0 | — | | — | | — | | 1 | 0 | |
| Bayer Leverkusen II | 2011–12 | Regionalliga West | 2 | 0 | — | | — | | — | | 2 | 0 | |
| Bayer Leverkusen II | Totals | | 30 | 0 | — | | — | | — | | 30 | 0 | — |
| Bayer Leverkusen | 2003–04 | Bundesliga | 0 | 0 | 0 | 0 | — | | — | | 0 | 0 | |
| Bayer Leverkusen | 2004–05 | Bundesliga | 0 | 0 | 0 | 0 | 0 | 0 | — | | 0 | 0 | |
| Bayer Leverkusen | 2005–06 | Bundesliga | 0 | 0 | 0 | 0 | 0 | 0 | — | | 0 | 0 | |
| Bayer Leverkusen | 2006–07 | Bundesliga | 11 | 0 | 0 | 0 | 4 | 0 | — | | 15 | 0 | |
| Bayer Leverkusen | 2007–08 | Bundesliga | 33 | 0 | 1 | 0 | 10 | 0 | — | | 44 | 0 | |
| Bayer Leverkusen | 2008–09 | Bundesliga | 31 | 0 | 6 | 0 | — | | — | | 37 | 0 | |
| Bayer Leverkusen | 2009–10 | Bundesliga | 31 | 0 | 2 | 0 | — | | — | | 33 | 0 | |
| Bayer Leverkusen | 2010–11 | Bundesliga | 32 | 0 | 2 | 0 | 10 | 0 | — | | 44 | 0 | |
| Bayer Leverkusen | 2011–12 | Bundesliga | 0 | 0 | 0 | 0 | 0 | 0 | — | | 0 | 0 | |
| Bayer Leverkusen | Totals | | 138 | 0 | 11 | 0 | 24 | 0 | — | | 173 | 0 | — |
| Hamburg | 2012–13 | Bundesliga | 32 | 0 | 1 | 0 | — | | — | | 33 | 0 | |
| Hamburg | 2013–14 | Bundesliga | 30 | 0 | 3 | 0 | — | | 0 | 0 | 33 | 0 | |
| Hamburg | 2014–15 | Bundesliga | 12 | 0 | 1 | 0 | — | | 2 | 0 | 15 | 0 | |
| Hamburg | 2015–16 | Bundesliga | 24 | 0 | 1 | 0 | — | | — | | 25 | 0 | |
| Hamburg | 2016–17 | Bundesliga | 19 | 0 | 1 | 0 | — | | — | | 20 | 0 | |
| Hamburg | Totals | | 117 | 0 | 7 | 0 | — | | 2 | 0 | 126 | 0 | — |
| Mainz 05 | 2017–18 | Bundesliga | 14 | 0 | 3 | 0 | — | | — | | 17 | 0 | |
| Mainz 05 | 2018–19 | Bundesliga | 0 | 0 | 0 | 0 | — | | — | | 0 | 0 | — |
| Mainz 05 | Totals | | 14 | 0 | 3 | 0 | — | | — | | 17 | 0 | — |
| Career totals | | | 299 | 0 | 21 | 0 | 24 | 0 | 2 | 0 | 346 | 0 | — |

- 1.Includes DFB-Pokal.
- 2.Includes UEFA Champions League and UEFA Europa League.
- 3.Includes Bundesliga relegation play-offs.

=== International ===
Appearances and goals by national team and year
| National team | Year | Apps | Goals |
|---|---|---|---|
| Germany | 2008 | 3 | 0 |
| Germany | 2009 | 5 | 0 |
| Germany | 2010 | 2 | 0 |
| Germany | 2011 | 0 | 0 |
| Germany | 2012 | 0 | 0 |
| Germany | 2013 | 2 | 0 |
| Total | | 12 | 0 |

== Honours ==
Individual

- Best Bundesliga Goalkeeper: 2008
