= Bayer 04 Leverkusen II =

Reserve association football team of Bayer 04 Leverkusen, based in Germany

Bayer Leverkusen II
- Full name: Bayer 04 Leverkusen II
- Dissolved: 2014; 12 years ago
- Ground: Ulrich-Haberland-Stadion, Platz 11
- Capacity: 3,200
- League: Regionalliga
- 2013–14: Regionalliga West, 8th (withdrawn)
Home colours	Away colours	Third colours

Bayer 04 Leverkusen II was the reserve team of German football club Bayer 04 Leverkusen. Until 2005, the team played as Bayer 04 Leverkusen Amateure.

The team has qualified for the DFB-Pokal, the German Cup, on eight occasions, but never advanced beyond the first round. Before being withdrawn from competition at the end of the 2013–14 season the team played in the tier four Regionalliga West.

== History ==
Bayer 04 Leverkusen Amateure first entered the highest football league in the Middle Rhine region, the Verbandsliga Mittelrhein, in 1978 and won the league in its fourth season there, in 1981. The team spent the next seventeen seasons in the tier-three Oberliga Nordrhein, gradually improving its results. In 1994 the Regionalliga was established as the new third tier of German football and the team won promotion to this level after an Oberliga championship in 1998.

Bayer Leverkusen Amateure became a yo-yo team between the Regionalliga and Oberliga, winning promotion to the former in 1998, 2001 and 2005 but suffering relegation again each time, in 2000, 2003 and 2007. It became a more permanent member of the Regionalliga when the Oberliga Nordrhein was disbanded in 2008 and the Regionalliga West established, with the team entering the latter league.

The team spent its last six seasons from 2008 to 2014 in the tier-four Regionalliga West, where its best result was an eighth place in its last season there.

The team also qualified for the DFB-Pokal eight times, in 1981–82, 1989–90, 1992–93, 1996–97, 1998–99, 2000–01, 2003–04 and 2007–08, but never advanced past the first round.

In 2014 a change in the regulations by the Deutsche Fußball Liga regarding reserve teams meant that such sides, in the form of under-23 teams, were not compulsory anymore for Bundesliga and 2nd Bundesliga clubs. Following this change, some reserve teams were withdrawn from competition, among them Heidenheim II, FSV Frankfurt II and Bayer 04 Leverkusen II. Bayer 04 Leverkusen had requested the change as it did not see much potential for reserve team players in the Regionalliga to break through to the Bundesliga side and wanted to focus on its under-17 and under-19 sides instead and to loan out young players.

== Honours ==
The team's honours:

- Oberliga Nordrhein
  - Champions: (3) 1998, 2001, 2005
  - Runners-up: 2008
- Verbandsliga Mittelrhein
  - Champions: 1981
- Middle Rhine Cup
  - Winners: (5) 1996, 1998, 2000, 2003, 2007

== Recent seasons ==
The recent season-by-season performance of the club:

Year	Division	Tier	Position
1999–2000	Regionalliga West/Südwest	III	16th↓
2000–01	Oberliga Nordrhein	IV	1st↑
2001–02	Regionalliga Nord	III	8th
2002–03	Regionalliga Nord	III	17th↓
2003–04	Oberliga Nordrhein	IV	4th
2004–05	Oberliga Nordrhein	IV	1st↑
2005–06	Regionalliga Nord	III	11th
2006–07	Regionalliga Nord	III	17th↓
2007–08	Oberliga Nordrhein	IV	2nd↑
2008–09	Regionalliga West	IV	9th
2009–10	Regionalliga West	IV	13th
2010–11	Regionalliga West	IV	15th
2011–12	Regionalliga West	IV	18th
2012–13	Regionalliga West	IV	11th
2013–14	Regionalliga West	IV	8th

- With the introduction of the Regionalligas in 1994 and the 3. Liga in 2008 as the new third tier, below the 2. Bundesliga, all leagues below dropped one tier. In 2000 all clubs from the disbanded Regionalliga West/Südwest from North Rhine-Westphalia joined the Regionalliga Nord, in 2008 these clubs left the league again to join the new Regionalliga West.

↑ Promoted	↓ Relegated

== Stadium ==
The team used to play their home game at Ulrich-Haberland-Stadion, Platz 11, next to the club's main stadium, with a capacity of 3,200.

== Players ==
=== Squad ===
As of 5 August 2025

Note: Flags indicate national team as defined under FIFA eligibility rules; some limited exceptions apply. Players may hold more than one non-FIFA nationality.

No.	Pos.	Nation	Player
1	GK	GER	Jesper Schlich
3	DF	GER	Nils Gernhardt
4	DF	GER	Ferdinand Pohl
6	MF	GER	Francesco Buono
7	FW	GER	Montrell Culbreath
8	MF	GER	Naba Mensah
11	FW	GER	Ken Izekor
16	FW	HUN	Márton Szép
17	FW	GER	Julien Kurowski
19	DF	GER	Isaiah Eichie
26	DF	ITA	Andrea Natali

No.	Pos.	Nation	Player
28	DF	GER	Ben Hawighorst
30	FW	GER	Emmanuel Chigozie Owen
-	MF	USA	Aaron Heard
-	FW	GER	Dustin Buck
-	DF	GER	Nebe-Sirak Domnic
-	MF	GER	Jeremiah Mensah
-	LB	GER	Osman Turay
-	MF	GER	Burak Kir
-	FW	TUR	Berkan Ermeç
-	MF	GER	Jonah Berghoff
-	GK	GER	Julian Leuchter
-	GK	GER	Simeon Rapsch
-	DF	MAR	Nassim El Massoudi
-	MF	BIH	Melis Djedovic
