= Ole Pohlmann =

German footballer (born 2001)

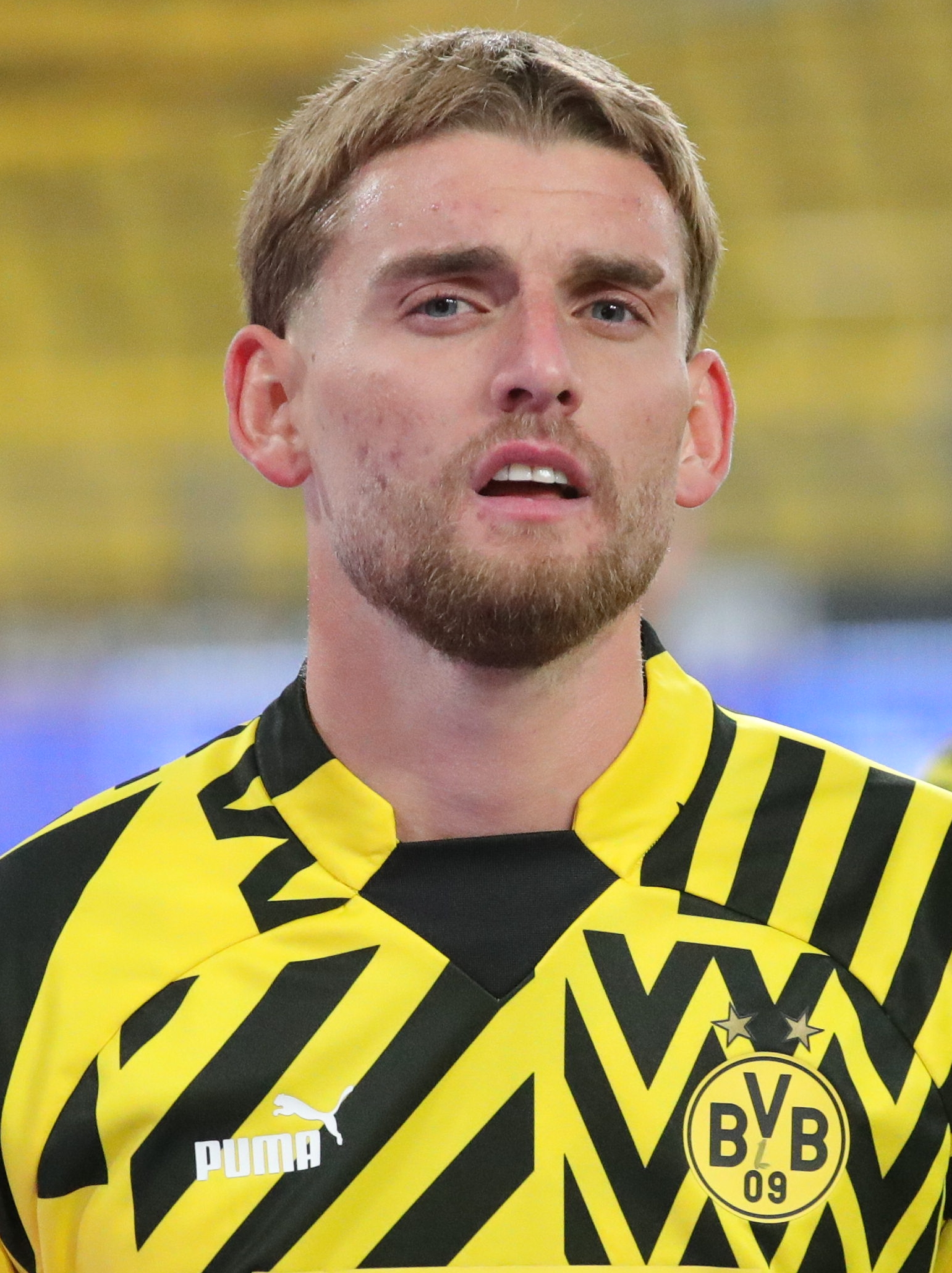
- Ole Pohlmann (2022)

Personal information
- Date of birth: 5 April 2001 (age 25)
- Place of birth: Minden, Germany
- Height: 1.83 m (6 ft 0 in)
- Position: Winger

Team information
- Current team: Greuther Fürth
- Number: 10

Youth career
- –2015: Hannover 96
- 2015–2020: VfL Wolfsburg

Senior career*
Years	Team	Apps	(Gls)
2020–2021	VfL Wolfsburg II	10	(1)
2021–2024	Borussia Dortmund II	97	(18)
2023–2024	Borussia Dortmund	2	(0)
2024–2026	Rio Ave	59	(2)
2026–	Greuther Fürth	0	(0)

International career^{‡}
2016	Germany U15	2	(0)
2016–2017	Germany U16	7	(3)
2017–2018	Germany U17	12	(2)
2018–2019	Germany U18	4	(0)
- * Club domestic league appearances and goals as of 25 May 2026 ‡ National team caps and goals as of 26 July 2021

Ole Pohlmann (born 5 April 2001), also known mononymously as Olinho, is a German professional footballer who plays as a winger for 2. Bundesliga club Greuther Fürth.

== Career ==
=== VfL Wolfsburg ===
A graduate of the club's youth academy, Pohlmann made his debut for VfL Wolfsburg II on 23 February 2020, coming on as a 74th-minute substitute for Jannis Heuer in a 4–2 victory over Eintracht Norderstedt. Prior to the 2020/21 season, he signed a new long-term deal with the club, with the intent to utilize him primarily with Wolfsburg II. However, he would make just eight appearances during the 2020/21 season, scoring once, before departing the club.

=== Borussia Dortmund II ===
In July 2021, Pohlmann signed with Borussia Dortmund II following their promotion to the 3. Liga. He made his debut for the club on the opening weekend of the season, coming on as a 78th-minute substitute for Richmond Tachie in a 2–1 victory over FSV Zwickau.

=== Borussia Dortmund ===
On 28 June 2023, Pohlmann was promoted to Dortmund's first team, having signed a two-year professional contract with the club. He made his competitive debut for the club on 2 February 2024, coming on as a 59th-minute substitute for Jamie Gittens in a 0–0 draw with Heidenheim. In a post-game interview, Pohlmann stated that the opportunity was "a childhood dream come true." He would make one more first team appearance for the club before departing in the summer.

=== Rio Ave ===
On 2 July 2024, Pohlmann signed a three-year contract with Rio Ave in the Portuguese Primeira Liga. Pohlmann netted his first goal for the club in February 2025, scoring in a 2–2 draw with Porto.

=== Greuther Fürth ===
On 10 July 2026, Pohlmann returned to Germany and signed a three-year contract with Greuther Fürth in 2. Bundesliga.

== Career statistics ==
=== Club ===
As of match played 3 February 2025

Appearances and goals by club, season and competition
Club	Season	League			Cup		Continental		Other		Total	
Club	Season	Division	Apps	Goals	Apps	Goals	Apps	Goals	Apps	Goals	Apps	Goals
VfL Wolfsburg II	2019–20	Regionalliga	2	0	–		–		–		2	0
VfL Wolfsburg II	2020–21	Regionalliga	8	1	–		–		–		8	1
VfL Wolfsburg II	Total		10	1	0	0	–		0	0	10	1
Borussia Dortmund II	2021–22	3. Liga	37	2	–		–		–		37	2
Borussia Dortmund II	2022–23	3. Liga	31	3	–		–		–		31	3
Borussia Dortmund II	2023–24	3. Liga	29	13	–		–		–		29	13
Borussia Dortmund II	Total		97	18	0	0	–		0	0	97	18
Borussia Dortmund	2023–24	Bundesliga	2	0	0	0	0	0	0	0	2	0
Rio Ave	2024–25	Primeira Liga	16	1	3 (Note: Appearance(s) in Taça de Portugal)	0	0	0	0	0	19	1
Career total			125	20	3	0	0	0	0	0	128	20
