= 2023–24 Borussia Dortmund season =

115th season in existence of Borussia Dortmund

Borussia Dortmund
2023–24 season
- Chairman: Hans-Joachim Watzke (CEO)
- Head coach: Edin Terzić
- Stadium: Westfalenstadion
- Bundesliga: 5th
- DFB-Pokal: Round of 16
- UEFA Champions League: Runners-up
- Top goalscorer: League: Donyell Malen (13); All: Niclas Füllkrug; Donyell Malen (15 each)
- Highest home attendance: 81,365 (23 matches)
- Lowest home attendance: 80,350 v Mainz 05
- Average home league attendance: 80,857
- Biggest win: 6–1 vs Schott Mainz (A)
- Biggest defeat: 0–4 vs Bayern Munich (H)
Home colours	Away colours	Cup / Europe colours

The 2023–24 season was the 115th season in the existence of Borussia Dortmund and the club's 48th consecutive season in the top flight of German football. In addition to the domestic league, they also competed in this season's editions of the DFB-Pokal and UEFA Champions League, reaching the final of the latter competition for the first time in eleven years.

The season was the first since 2015–16 without Raphaël Guerreiro, who departed to join rivals Bayern Munich. It was also the first time a supporter was allowed to design the Borussia Dortmund home shirt.

== Players ==
=== First team squad ===
As of 4 May 2024

Note: Flags indicate national team as defined under FIFA eligibility rules; some limited exceptions apply. Players may hold more than one non-FIFA nationality.

No.	Pos.	Nation	Player
1	GK	SUI	Gregor Kobel (vice-captain)
2	DF	ESP	Mateu Morey
4	DF	GER	Nico Schlotterbeck
5	DF	ALG	Ramy Bensebaini
6	MF	TUR	Salih Özcan
8	MF	GER	Felix Nmecha
9	FW	CIV	Sébastien Haller
10	FW	ENG	Jadon Sancho (on loan from Manchester United)
11	FW	GER	Marco Reus
14	FW	GER	Niclas Füllkrug
15	DF	GER	Mats Hummels
16	FW	BEL	Julien Duranville
17	MF	GER	Marius Wolf
18	FW	GER	Youssoufa Moukoko
19	MF	GER	Julian Brandt
20	MF	AUT	Marcel Sabitzer

No.	Pos.	Nation	Player
21	FW	NED	Donyell Malen
22	DF	NED	Ian Maatsen (on loan from Chelsea)
23	MF	GER	Emre Can (captain)
25	DF	GER	Niklas Süle (3rd captain)
26	DF	NOR	Julian Ryerson
27	FW	GER	Karim Adeyemi
30	MF	GER	Ole Pohlmann
31	GK	GER	Silas Ostrzinski
32	MF	GUI	Abdoulaye Kamara
33	GK	GER	Alexander Meyer
35	GK	POL	Marcel Lotka
38	MF	GER	Kjell Wätjen
43	MF	ENG	Jamie Bynoe-Gittens
47	DF	GER	Antonios Papadopoulos
48	FW	GER	Samuel Bamba

=== Out on loan ===
Note: Flags indicate national team as defined under FIFA eligibility rules; some limited exceptions apply. Players may hold more than one non-FIFA nationality.

No.	Pos.	Nation	Player
7	MF	USA	Giovanni Reyna (at Nottingham Forest until 30 June 2024)
36	MF	GER	Tom Rothe (at Holstein Kiel until 30 June 2024)
44	DF	FRA	Soumaila Coulibaly (at Royal Antwerp until 30 June 2024)

== Transfers ==
=== In ===
No.	Pos.	Player	Transferred from	Fee	Date	Source
10	MF	(Belgium) Thorgan Hazard	(Netherlands) PSV Eindhoven	Loan return	1 July 2023	
–	FW	(Netherlands) Jayden Braaf	(Italy) Hellas Verona	Loan return	1 July 2023	
–	DF	(Germany) Ansgar Knauff	(Germany) Eintracht Frankfurt	Loan return	1 July 2023	
5	DF	(Algeria) Ramy Bensebaini	(Germany) Borussia Mönchengladbach	Free transfer	1 July 2023	
8	MF	(Germany) Felix Nmecha	(Germany) VfL Wolfsburg	€30,000,000	3 July 2023	
20	MF	(Austria) Marcel Sabitzer	(Germany) Bayern Munich	€19,000,000	24 July 2023	
14	FW	(Germany) Niclas Füllkrug	(Germany) Werder Bremen	€13,000,000	31 August 2023	
10	FW	(England) Jadon Sancho	(England) Manchester United	Loan	11 January 2024	
22	DF	(Netherlands) Ian Maatsen	(England) Chelsea	Loan	12 January 2024	

=== Out ===
No.	Pos.	Player	Transferred to	Fee	Date	Source
8	MF	(Germany) Mahmoud Dahoud	(England) Brighton & Hove Albion	Free transfer	1 July 2023	
13	DF	(Portugal) Raphaël Guerreiro	(Germany) Bayern Munich	Free transfer	1 July 2023	
20	FW	(France) Anthony Modeste	(Egypt) Al Ahly	Free transfer	1 July 2023	
30	DF	(Germany) Felix Passlack	(Germany) VfL Bochum	Free transfer	1 July 2023	
38	GK	(Germany) Luca Unbehaun	(Germany) SC Verl	Free transfer	1 July 2023	
46	FW	(Croatia) Marco Pašalić	(Croatia) Rijeka	Free transfer	1 July 2023	
22	MF	(England) Jude Bellingham	(Spain) Real Madrid	€103,000,000	1 July 2023	
36	DF	(Germany) Tom Rothe	(Germany) Holstein Kiel	Loan	1 July 2023	
49	FW	(Germany) Justin Njinmah	(Germany) Werder Bremen	End of loan	1 July 2023	
–	DF	(Germany) Ansgar Knauff	(Germany) Eintracht Frankfurt	€5,000,000	1 July 2023	
–	FW	(Netherlands) Jayden Braaf	(Italy) Hellas Verona	€1,000,000	2 July 2023	
42	MF	(Turkey) Göktan Gürpüz	(Turkey) Trabzonspor	Free transfer	19 July 2023	
14	DF	(Germany) Nico Schulz	(Turkey) MKE Ankaragücü	Free transfer	20 July 2023	
44	DF	(France) Soumaïla Coulibaly	(Belgium) Antwerp	Loan	11 August 2023	
10	MF	(Belgium) Thorgan Hazard	(Belgium) Anderlecht	€4,000,000	7 September 2023	
7	MF	(United States) Giovanni Reyna	(England) Nottingham Forest	Loan	31 January 2024	
24	DF	(Belgium) Thomas Meunier	(Turkey) Trabzonspor	Free transfer	7 February 2024	

== Pre-season and friendlies ==
Win Draw Loss Fixtures

=== Pre-season ===
12 July 2023 Friendly	Westfalia Rhynern	0–7	Borussia Dortmund	Hamm, Germany
18:00 CEST (UTC+2)	Sezer (penalty missed) 74'	Report	Reus 12', 24'; Rijkhoff 43'; Besong 53', 67'; Blank 84'; Aning 87'	Stadium: Sportplatz Papenloh; Referee: Dominic Stock

19 July 2023 Friendly	Rot-Weiß Oberhausen	2–3	Borussia Dortmund	Oberhausen, Germany
18:00 CEST (UTC+2)	Ezekwem 6'; Ruzgis 69'	Report	Reus 14'; Papadopoulos 49'; Bamba 90'	Stadium: Niederrheinstadion; Attendance: 8,610; Referee: Martin Ulankiewicz

22 July 2023 Friendly	Rot-Weiß Erfurt	1–2	Borussia Dortmund	Erfurt, Germany
16:30 CEST (UTC+2)	Moritz (yellow card) 9'; Elva 23'	Report	Hazard 81'; Wolf 86'	Stadium: Steigerwaldstadion; Attendance: 16,724; Referee: Oliver Lossius

27 July 2023 Friendly	San Diego Loyal	0–6	Borussia Dortmund	San Diego, United States
19:30 PDT (UTC−7)		Report	Duranville 2'; Moukoko 27'; Reus 60'; Meunier 62'; Haller 68' (pen.); Hazard (yellow card) 78'; Blank (yellow card) 84'; Besong 89'; Bamba (yellow card) 90+4'	Stadium: Snapdragon Stadium; Attendance: 12,207

30 July 2023 Friendly	Manchester United	2–3	Borussia Dortmund	Las Vegas, United States
18:00 PDT (UTC−7)	Dalot 24'; Forson (yellow card) 29'; Antony 52'	Report	Adeyemi (yellow card) 29'; Hummels (yellow card) 36'; Malen 43', 44'; Moukoko 71'	Stadium: Allegiant Stadium; Attendance: 50,857; Referee: Ismail Elfath (United States)

2 August 2023 Friendly	Chelsea	1–1	Borussia Dortmund	Chicago, United States
19:30 CDT (UTC−7)	James (yellow card) 45+2'; Burstow 89'	Report	Özcan (yellow card) 61'; Wolf 80'	Stadium: Soldier Field; Attendance: 48,183

6 August 2023 Friendly	Borussia Dortmund	3–1	Ajax	Dortmund, Germany
17:00 CEST (UTC+2)	Brandt 6'; Nmecha 54', 60'	Report	Brobbey 7', (yellow card) 89'; Kudus (yellow card) 38'; Van den Boomen (yellow card) 79'	Stadium: Signal Iduna Park; Attendance: 80,500

=== Mid-season ===
6 January 2024 Friendly	Borussia Dortmund	2–2	AZ	Marbella, Spain
15:00 CET (UTC+1)	Sabitzer 63'; Reus 80'	Report	Pavlidis 7'; Odgaard 36'	Stadium: Marbella Football Center; Attendance: 550; Referee: José Luis Guzmán Mansilla (Spain)
Note: The match was played in four periods of thirty minutes each.

9 January 2024 Friendly	Borussia Dortmund	3–3	Standard Liège	Marbella, Spain
11:00 CET (UTC+1)	Meunier 15'; Papadopoulos 70'; Bamba 89'		Kanga 36', 59'; Perica 77'	Stadium: Marbella Football Center

== Competitions ==
=== Overall record ===
Competition	First match	Last match	Starting round	Final position	Record							
Competition	First match	Last match	Starting round	Final position	Pld	W	D	L	GF	GA	GD	Win %
Bundesliga	19 August 2023	18 May 2024	Matchday 1	5th	34	18	9	7	68	43	+25	52.94
DFB-Pokal	12 August 2023	6 December 2023	First round	Round of 16	3	2	0	1	7	3	+4	66.67
UEFA Champions League	19 September 2023	1 June 2024	Group stage	Runners-up	13	7	3	3	17	11	+6	53.85
Total					50	27	12	11	92	57	+35	54.00

Source: Soccerway

=== Bundesliga ===
==== League table ====
Pos	Team	Pld	W	D	L	GF	GA	GD	Pts	Qualification or relegation
3	Bayern Munich	34	23	3	8	94	45	+49	72	Qualification for the Champions League league phase (Note: The Bundesliga gained an additional Champions League place as a result of Germany finishing as one of the two associations with the highest UEFA coefficient points in 2023–24.)
4	RB Leipzig	34	19	8	7	77	39	+38	65	Qualification for the Champions League league phase
5	Borussia Dortmund	34	18	9	7	68	43	+25	63	Qualification for the Champions League league phase
6	Eintracht Frankfurt	34	11	14	9	51	50	+1	47	Qualification for the Europa League league phase (Note: Since the 2023–24 DFB-Pokal winners, Bayer Leverkusen, qualified for the Champions League via league position, the spot reserved for the DFB-Pokal winners (Europa League league phase) was passed to the seventh-placed team, and the Conference League play-off round spot was passed to the eighth-placed team.)
7	TSG Hoffenheim	34	13	7	14	66	66	0	46	Qualification for the Europa League league phase

Source: DFB
Rules for classification: 1) Points; 2) Goal difference; 3) Goals scored; 4) Head-to-head results; 5) Head-to-head away goals scored; 6) Away goals scored; 7) Play-off.

==== Results summary ====
Overall								Home						Away					
Pld	W	D	L	GF	GA	GD	Pts	W	D	L	GF	GA	GD	W	D	L	GF	GA	GD
34	18	9	7	68	43	+25	63	10	3	4	37	22	+15	8	6	3	31	21	+10

Source: DFB

==== Results by round ====
Round	1	2	3	4	5	6	7	8	9	10	11	12	13	14	15	16	17	18	19	20	21	22	23	24	25	26	27	28	29	30	31	32	33	34
Ground	H	A	H	A	H	A	H	H	A	H	A	H	A	H	A	H	A	A	H	A	H	A	H	A	A	H	A	H	A	H	A	H	A	H
Result	W	D	D	W	W	W	W	W	D	L	L	W	D	L	D	D	W	W	W	D	W	D	L	W	W	W	W	L	W	D	L	W	L	W
Position	7	6	9	7	6	4	4	4	4	4	5	4	5	5	5	5	5	5	4	4	4	4	4	4	4	4	4	5	5	5	5	5	5	5

Source: DFB
A = Away; H = Home; W = Win; D = Draw; L = Loss

==== Matches ====
The league fixtures were announced on 30 June 2023.

19 August 2023 1	Borussia Dortmund	1–0	1. FC Köln	Dortmund
18:30 CEST (UTC+2)	Malen 88', (yellow card) 90+1'	Report		Stadium: Signal Iduna Park; Attendance: 81,365; Referee: Deniz Aytekin

26 August 2023 2	VfL Bochum	1–1	Borussia Dortmund	Bochum
15:30 CEST (UTC+2)	Stöger 13', (yellow card) 66'; Bero (yellow card) 71'	Report	Malen 56'; Can (yellow card) 75'	Stadium: Vonovia Ruhrstadion; Attendance: 26,000; Referee: Robert Schröder

1 September 2023 3	Borussia Dortmund	2–2	1. FC Heidenheim	Dortmund
20:30 CEST (UTC+2)	Brandt 7'; Can 15' (pen.), (yellow card) 90+3'; Bensebaini (yellow card) 61'; Haller (yellow card) 82'	Report	Dinkçi (yellow card) 35', (goal) 61'; Beste (yellow card) 57'; Pieringer (yellow card) 61'; Kleindienst 82' (pen.)	Stadium: Signal Iduna Park; Attendance: 81,365; Referee: Tobias Reichel

16 September 2023 4	SC Freiburg	2–4	Borussia Dortmund	Freiburg
15:30 CEST (UTC+2)	Höler 45+2'; Höfler 45+6', (red card) 82'; Lienhart (yellow card) 86'; Eggestein (yellow card) 89'	Report	Hummels 11', 88'; Bensebaini (yellow card) 45+4'; Malen 60'; Wolf (yellow card) 68'; Can (yellow card) 78'; Reus 90+2'	Stadium: Europa-Park Stadion; Attendance: 34,700; Referee: Tobias Stieler

23 September 2023 5	Borussia Dortmund	1–0	VfL Wolfsburg	Dortmund
15:30 CEST (UTC+2)	Reus 68'	Report	Černý (yellow card) 24'	Stadium: Signal Iduna Park; Attendance: 81,365; Referee: Sven Jablonski

29 September 2023 6	1899 Hoffenheim	1–3	Borussia Dortmund	Sinsheim
20:30 CEST (UTC+2)	Kramarić 25' (pen.); Brooks (yellow card) 44'; Vogt (yellow card) 61'; Kabak (yellow card) 85'	Report	Füllkrug 18'; Hummels (yellow card) 23'; Reus 45+3', (yellow card) 87'; Nmecha (yellow card) 60'; Bensebaini (yellow card) 67' (yellow-red card) 71'; Ryerson 90+5'	Stadium: Rhein-Neckar-Arena; Attendance: 30,150; Referee: Florian Badstübner

7 October 2023 7	Borussia Dortmund	4–2	Union Berlin	Dortmund
15:30 CEST (UTC+2)	Füllkrug 7'; Hummels (yellow card) 30'; Schlotterbeck 49'; Brandt 54'; Ryerson 71'	Report	Gosens 9', (yellow card) 64'; Bonucci 31' (pen.)	Stadium: Signal Iduna Park; Attendance: 81,365; Referee: Patrick Ittrich

20 October 2023 8	Borussia Dortmund	1–0	Werder Bremen	Dortmund
20:30 CEST (UTC+2)	Nmecha (yellow card) 44'; Brandt 67'	Report	Bittencourt (yellow card) 61'; Stage (yellow card) 75'; Veljković (yellow card) 83'; Deman (yellow card) 90+5'	Stadium: Signal Iduna Park; Attendance: 81,365; Referee: Felix Brych

29 October 2023 9	Eintracht Frankfurt	3–3	Borussia Dortmund	Frankfurt
15:30 CET (UTC+1)	Marmoush 8' (pen.), 24', (yellow card) 42'; Buta (yellow card) 45+8'; Pacho (yellow card) 52'; Chaïbi 68'	Report	Özcan (yellow card) 11'; Sabitzer 45+1'; Moukoko 54'; Adeyemi (yellow card) 76'; Brandt 82'	Stadium: Deutsche Bank Park; Attendance: 56,500; Referee: Robert Schröder

4 November 2023 10	Borussia Dortmund	0–4	Bayern Munich	Dortmund
18:30 CET (UTC+1)	Hummels (yellow card) 61'; Ryerson (yellow card) 74'; Sabitzer (yellow card) 76'	Report	Upamecano 4'; Kane 9', 72', 90+3'; Sané (yellow card) 22'; Laimer (yellow card) 85'	Stadium: Signal Iduna Park; Attendance: 81,365; Referee: Deniz Aytekin

11 November 2023 11	VfB Stuttgart	2–1	Borussia Dortmund	Stuttgart
15:30 CET (UTC+1)	Führich (penalty missed) 11'; Undav (yellow card) 15', (goal) 42'; Karazor (yellow card) 59'; Guirassy 83' (pen.)	Report	Kobel (yellow card) 10'; Adeyemi (yellow card) 15'; Füllkrug 36'; Sabitzer (yellow card) 49'	Stadium: MHPArena; Attendance: 55,000; Referee: Tobias Stieler

25 November 2023 12	Borussia Dortmund	4–2	Borussia Mönchengladbach	Dortmund
15:30 CET (UTC+1)	Sabitzer 30'; Füllkrug 32'; Bynoe-Gittens 45'; Brandt (yellow card) 81'; Malen 90+7'	Report	Reitz 13'; Koné 28', (yellow card) 87'; Weigl (yellow card) 54'	Stadium: Signal Iduna Park; Attendance: 81,365; Referee: Sven Jablonski

3 December 2023 13	Bayer Leverkusen	1–1	Borussia Dortmund	Leverkusen
17:30 CET (UTC+1)	Frimpong (yellow card) 12'; Palacios (yellow card) 74'; Boniface 74'; Kossounou (yellow card) 90+1'	Report	Ryerson 5'; Hummels (yellow card) 77'; Wolf (yellow card) 90+1'	Stadium: BayArena; Attendance: 30,210; Referee: Daniel Siebert

9 December 2023 14	Borussia Dortmund	2–3	RB Leipzig	Dortmund
18:30 CET (UTC+1)	Hummels (red card) 15'; Süle 45+6'; Özcan (yellow card) 60'; Füllkrug 90+3'	Report	Bensebaini 32' (o.g.); Simakan (yellow card) 35'; Baumgartner 54'; Simons (yellow card) 61'; Openda (yellow card) 66'; Poulsen 90+1'	Stadium: Signal Iduna Park; Attendance: 81,365; Referee: Sven Jablonski

16 December 2023 15	FC Augsburg	1–1	Borussia Dortmund	Augsburg
15:30 CET (UTC+1)	Demirović 23'; Gouweleeuw (yellow card) 80'; Gumny (yellow card) 90+4'	Report	Malen 35'; Haller (yellow card) 90+1'	Stadium: WWK Arena; Attendance: 30,660; Referee: Matthias Jöllenbeck

19 December 2023 16	Borussia Dortmund	1–1	Mainz 05	Dortmund
20:30 CET (UTC+1)	Brandt 29'	Report	Bell (yellow card) 39'; Van den Berg 43'; Burkardt (yellow card) 85'; Krauß (yellow card) 90'; Barkok (yellow card) 90+2'	Stadium: Signal Iduna Park; Attendance: 80,350; Referee: Marco Fritz

13 January 2024 17	Darmstadt 98	0–3	Borussia Dortmund	Darmstadt
18:30 CET (UTC+1)	Maglica (yellow card) 51'	Report	Bynoe-Gittens (yellow card) 3'; Brandt 24'; Maatsen (yellow card) 31'; Reus 77'; Reyna (yellow card) 90'; Moukoko 90+2'	Stadium: Merck-Stadion am Böllenfalltor; Attendance: 17,810; Referee: Deniz Aytekin

20 January 2024 18	1. FC Köln	0–4	Borussia Dortmund	Cologne
15:30 CET (UTC+1)	Chabot (yellow card) 77'; Thielmann (yellow card) 85'	Report	Malen 12', 61'; Özcan (yellow card) 27'; Füllkrug 58' (pen.); Maatsen (yellow card) 82'; Moukoko 90+4'	Stadium: RheinEnergieStadion; Attendance: 50,000; Referee: Daniel Schlager

28 January 2024 19	Borussia Dortmund	3–1	VfL Bochum	Dortmund
17:30 CET (UTC+1)	Füllkrug 7' (pen.), 72', 90+1' (pen.); Malen (yellow card) 56'	Report	Riemann (yellow card) 3'; Schlotterbeck 45' (o.g.); Wittek (yellow card) 59'; Gamboa (yellow card) 89'	Stadium: Signal Iduna Park; Attendance: 81,365; Referee: Benjamin Brand

2 February 2024 20	1. FC Heidenheim	0–0	Borussia Dortmund	Heidenheim
20:30 CET (UTC+1)		Report	Maatsen (yellow card) 80'; Malen (yellow card) 90+5'	Stadium: Voith-Arena; Attendance: 15,000; Referee: Bastian Dankert

9 February 2024 21	Borussia Dortmund	3–0	SC Freiburg	Dortmund
20:30 CET (UTC+1)	Ryerson (yellow card) 14'; Malen 16', 45+7', (yellow card) 73'; Füllkrug 87'	Report		Stadium: Signal Iduna Park; Attendance: 81,365; Referee: Harm Osmers

17 February 2024 22	VfL Wolfsburg	1–1	Borussia Dortmund	Wolfsburg
15:30 CET (UTC+1)	Gerhardt 64', (yellow card) 71'; Arnold (yellow card) 90+7'; Jenz (yellow card) 90+8'	Report	Füllkrug 8'; Moukoko (yellow card) 90+8'	Stadium: Volkswagen Arena; Attendance: 28,917; Referee: Martin Petersen

25 February 2024 23	Borussia Dortmund	2–3	1899 Hoffenheim	Dortmund
17:30 CET (UTC+1)	Malen 21', (yellow card) 90+5'; Schlotterbeck 25'; Sabitzer (yellow card) 45'	Report	Bebou 2'; Tohumcu (yellow card) 24'; Beier 61', 64'; Brooks (yellow card) 90+3'; Geiger (yellow card) 90+4'	Stadium: Signal Iduna Park; Attendance: 81,365; Referee: Marco Fritz

2 March 2024 24	Union Berlin	0–2	Borussia Dortmund	Berlin
15:30 CET (UTC+1)	Haberer (yellow card) 75'; Vertessen (yellow card) 90+5'	Report	Adeyemi 41'; Ryerson (yellow card) 45'; Maatsen 90'	Stadium: Stadion An der Alten Försterei; Attendance: 22,012; Referee: Christian Dingert

9 March 2024 25	Werder Bremen	1–2	Borussia Dortmund	Bremen
18:30 CET (UTC+1)	Njinmah 70'; Schmid (yellow card) 77'	Report	Malen 21'; Sancho 38'; Sabitzer (red card) 45+1'; Schlotterbeck (yellow card) 78'; Adeyemi (yellow card) 90+5'	Stadium: Weserstadion; Attendance: 42,100; Referee: Deniz Aytekin

17 March 2024 26	Borussia Dortmund	3–1	Eintracht Frankfurt	Dortmund
17:30 CET (UTC+1)	Adeyemi 33'; Hummels 81'; Can (yellow card) 87', (goal) 90+3' (pen.)	Report	Götze 13'; Buta (yellow card) 80'; Koch (yellow card) 90+2'	Stadium: Signal Iduna Park; Attendance: 81,365; Referee: Tobias Stieler

30 March 2024 27	Bayern Munich	0–2	Borussia Dortmund	Munich
18:30 CEST (UTC+1)		Report	Adeyemi 10'; Ryerson 83'	Stadium: Allianz Arena; Attendance: 75,000; Referee: Harm Osmers

6 April 2024 28	Borussia Dortmund	0–1	VfB Stuttgart	Dortmund
18:30 CEST (UTC+2)	Brandt (yellow card) 45+1'; Adeyemi (yellow card) 72'	Report	Stiller (yellow card) 9'; Millot (yellow card) 26'; Guirassy 64'; Karazor (yellow card) 71'; Nübel (yellow card) 85'	Stadium: Signal Iduna Park; Attendance: 81,365; Referee: Matthias Jöllenbeck

13 April 2024 29	Borussia Mönchengladbach	1–2	Borussia Dortmund	Mönchengladbach
15:30 CEST (UTC+2)	Wöber 36'; Itakura (yellow card) 84'	Report	Maatsen (yellow card) 15'; Sabitzer 22', 28' (pen.); Adeyemi (yellow card) 45+4' (yellow-red card) 55'; Nmecha (yellow card) 90+4'	Stadium: Borussia-Park; Attendance: 54,042; Referee: Florian Badstübner

21 April 2024 30	Borussia Dortmund	1–1	Bayer Leverkusen	Dortmund
17:30 CEST (UTC+2)	Maatsen (yellow card) 37'; Can (yellow card) 45+2'; Füllkrug (yellow card) 45+3', (goal) 81'; Schlotterbeck (yellow card) 88'	Report	Tella (yellow card) 28'; Frimpong (yellow card) 88'; Xhaka (yellow card) 90+1'; Stanišić 90+7'	Stadium: Signal Iduna Park; Attendance: 81,365; Referee: Daniel Siebert

27 April 2024 31	RB Leipzig	4–1	Borussia Dortmund	Leipzig
15:30 CEST (UTC+2)	Openda 23'; Šeško 45+2'; Simakan (yellow card) 37', (goal) 46'; Baumgartner 80'	Report	Sancho 20', (yellow card) 37'; Schlotterbeck (yellow card) 76'	Stadium: Red Bull Arena; Attendance: 47,069; Referee: Deniz Aytekin

4 May 2024 32	Borussia Dortmund	5–1	FC Augsburg	Dortmund
15:30 CEST (UTC+2)	Moukoko 4', 29'; Malen 20'; Reus 34'; Nmecha 64'	Report	Bauer (yellow card) 10'; Vargas 32'	Stadium: Signal Iduna Park; Attendance: 81,365; Referee: Robert Schröder

11 May 2024 33	Mainz 05	3–0	Borussia Dortmund	Mainz
18:30 CEST (UTC+2)	Barreiro 12', (yellow card) 56'; Lee 19', 23'; Hanche-Olsen (yellow card) 45+1'	Report	Reus (yellow card) 41'; Schlotterbeck (yellow card) 80'	Stadium: Mewa Arena; Attendance: 33,305; Referee: Tobias Stieler

18 May 2024 34	Borussia Dortmund	4–0	Darmstadt 98	Dortmund
15:30 CEST (UTC+2)	Maatsen 30'; Reus 38'; Brandt 72'; Malen 88'	Report	Klarer (yellow card) 7'; Gjasula (yellow card) 45'; Vilhelmsson (yellow card) 59'	Stadium: Signal Iduna Park; Attendance: 81,365; Referee: Daniel Siebert

=== DFB-Pokal ===
The first round draw was held on 18 June 2023.

12 August 2023 First round	Schott Mainz	1–6	Borussia Dortmund	Mainz
15:30 CEST (UTC+2)	Gans 34'; Ahlbach (yellow card) 44'; Roden (yellow card) 68'; Müller (yellow card) 87'	Report	Can (yellow card) 8'; Haller 22', 35'; Brandt 24'; Sabitzer 57'; Malen 79'; Moukoko 85'	Stadium: Mewa Arena; Attendance: 30,312; Referee: Benjamin Brand
Note: The match took place at the Mewa Arena, instead of Schott Mainz's home stadium, the Otto-Schott-Sportzentrum in Mainz.

1 November 2023 Second round	Borussia Dortmund	1–0	1899 Hoffenheim	Dortmund
18:00 CET (UTC+1)	Reus 43'; Schlotterbeck (yellow card) 56'	Report	Kabak (yellow card) 66' (yellow-red card) 90+4'; Weghorst (yellow card) 75'	Stadium: Signal Iduna Park; Attendance: 81,365; Referee: Harm Osmers

6 December 2023 Round of 16	VfB Stuttgart	2–0	Borussia Dortmund	Stuttgart
20:45 CET (UTC+1)	Guirassy 55'; Anton (yellow card) 64'; Silas 77'; Karazor (yellow card) 90+2'	Report	Bensebaini (yellow card) 68'	Stadium: MHPArena; Attendance: 54,500; Referee: Benjamin Brand

=== UEFA Champions League ===
==== Group stage ====
The draw for the group stage was held on 31 August 2023.

Pos	Team	Pld	W	D	L	GF	GA	GD	Pts	Qualification	DOR	PAR	MIL	NEW
1	(Germany) Borussia Dortmund	6	3	2	1	7	4	+3	11	Advance to knockout phase	—	1–1	0–0	2–0
2	(France) Paris Saint-Germain	6	2	2	2	9	8	+1	8 (Note: Tied on head-to-head points. Head-to-head goal difference: Paris Saint-Germain +2, Milan −2.)	Advance to knockout phase	2–0	—	3–0	1–1
3	(Italy) Milan	6	2	2	2	5	8	−3	8	Transfer to Europa League	1–3	2–1	—	0–0
4	(England) Newcastle United	6	1	2	3	6	7	−1	5		0–1	4–1	1–2	—

Source: UEFA
Rules for classification: Group stage tiebreakers
Notes:

19 September 2023 1	Paris Saint-Germain (France)	2–0	(Germany) Borussia Dortmund	Paris, France
21:00 CEST (UTC+2)	Mbappé 49' (pen.); Hakimi 58'	Report	Schlotterbeck (yellow card) 66'; Can (yellow card) 67'; Ryerson (yellow card) 89'	Stadium: Parc des Princes; Attendance: 47,379; Referee: Jesús Gil Manzano (Spain)

4 October 2023 2	Borussia Dortmund (Germany)	0–0	(Italy) Milan	Dortmund, Germany
21:00 CEST (UTC+2)	Schlotterbeck (yellow card) 19'; Can (yellow card) 25'; Hummels (yellow card) 81'	Report	Reijnders (yellow card) 23'; Musah (yellow card) 88'	Stadium: Westfalenstadion; Attendance: 81,365; Referee: Szymon Marciniak (Poland)

25 October 2023 3	Newcastle United (England)	0–1	(Germany) Borussia Dortmund	Newcastle upon Tyne, England
20:00 BST (UTC+1)	Bruno Guimarães (yellow card) 79'	Report	Wolf (yellow card) 35'; Nmecha 45'	Stadium: St James' Park; Attendance: 52,024; Referee: Artur Soares Dias (Portugal)

7 November 2023 4	Borussia Dortmund (Germany)	2–0	(England) Newcastle United	Dortmund, Germany
18:45 CET (UTC+1)	Füllkrug 26'; Brandt 79'	Report	Hall (yellow card) 9'	Stadium: Westfalenstadion; Attendance: 81,365; Referee: Alejandro Hernández Hernández (Spain)

28 November 2023 5	Milan (Italy)	1–3	(Germany) Borussia Dortmund	Milan, Italy
21:00 CET (UTC+1)	Giroud (penalty missed) 6'; Chukwueze 37'; Tomori (yellow card) 67'	Report	Reus 10' (pen.); Bynoe-Gittens 59'; Adeyemi 69'; Can (yellow card) 90+6'	Stadium: San Siro; Attendance: 75,292; Referee: István Kovács (Romania)

13 December 2023 6	Borussia Dortmund (Germany)	1–1	(France) Paris Saint-Germain	Dortmund, Germany
21:00 CET (UTC+1)	Adeyemi 51'; Hummels (yellow card) 57'	Report	Marquinhos (yellow card) 45'; Zaïre-Emery 56'	Stadium: Westfalenstadion; Attendance: 81,365; Referee: Glenn Nyberg (Sweden)

==== Knockout phase ====
===== Round of 16 =====
The draw for the round of 16 was held on 18 December 2023.

20 February 2024 First leg	PSV Eindhoven (Netherlands)	1–1	(Germany) Borussia Dortmund	Eindhoven, Netherlands
21:00 CET (UTC+1)	Lozano (yellow card) 22'; De Jong 56' (pen.)	Report	Malen 24'; Maatsen (yellow card) 42'; Schlotterbeck (yellow card) 45+1'	Stadium: Philips Stadion; Attendance: 34,950; Referee: Srđan Jovanović (Serbia)

13 March 2024 Second leg	Borussia Dortmund (Germany)	2–0 (3–1 agg.)	(Netherlands) PSV Eindhoven	Dortmund, Germany
21:00 CET (UTC+1)	Sancho 3'; Süle (yellow card) 88'; Nmecha (yellow card) 89'; Reus 90+5'	Report		Stadium: Westfalenstadion; Attendance: 81,365; Referee: Daniele Orsato (Italy)

===== Quarter-finals =====
The draw for the quarter-finals was held on 15 March 2024.

10 April 2024 First leg	Atlético Madrid (Spain)	2–1	(Germany) Borussia Dortmund	Madrid, Spain
21:00 CEST (UTC+2)	De Paul 4'; Lino (yellow card) 27', (goal) 32'; Llorente (yellow card) 28'; Giménez (yellow card) 75'	Report	Can (yellow card) 24'; Maatsen (yellow card) 53'; Haller 81'	Stadium: Metropolitano Stadium; Attendance: 68,641; Referee: Marco Guida (Italy)

16 April 2024 Second leg	Borussia Dortmund (Germany)	4–2 (5–4 agg.)	(Spain) Atlético Madrid	Dortmund, Germany
21:00 CEST (UTC+2)	Brandt 34'; Maatsen 39'; Ryerson (yellow card) 43'; Füllkrug 71'; Sabitzer 74'	Report	Azpilicueta (yellow card) 30'; Hermoso (yellow card) 45+1'; Hummels 49' (o.g.); Correa 64'	Stadium: Westfalenstadion; Attendance: 81,365; Referee: Slavko Vinčić (Slovenia)

===== Semi-finals =====
The draw for the semi-finals was held on 15 March 2024, after the draw for the quarter-finals.

1 May 2024 First leg	Borussia Dortmund (Germany)	1–0	(France) Paris Saint-Germain	Dortmund, Germany
21:00 CEST (UTC+2)	Maatsen (yellow card) 19'; Füllkrug 36'; Schlotterbeck (yellow card) 73'	Report	Fabián (yellow card) 53'	Stadium: Westfalenstadion; Attendance: 81,365; Referee: Anthony Taylor (England)

7 May 2024 Second leg	Paris Saint-Germain (France)	0–1 (0–2 agg.)	(Germany) Borussia Dortmund	Paris, France
21:00 CEST (UTC+2)	Dembélé (yellow card) 75'; Hakimi (yellow card) 84'	Report	Hummels 50', (yellow card) 65'; Sabitzer (yellow card) 64'	Stadium: Parc des Princes; Attendance: 46,435; Referee: Daniele Orsato (Italy)

===== Final =====
1 June 2024 Final	Borussia Dortmund (Germany)	0–2	(Spain) Real Madrid	London, England
20:00 BST (UTC+1)	Schlotterbeck (yellow card) 40'; Sabitzer (yellow card) 43'; Hummels (yellow card) 79'	Report	Vinícius (yellow card) 35', (goal) 83'; Carvajal 74'	Stadium: Wembley Stadium; Attendance: 86,212; Referee: Slavko Vinčić (Slovenia)

== Statistics ==
=== Appearances and goals ===
No.	Pos	Nat	Player	Total		Bundesliga		DFB-Pokal		Champions League	
No.	Pos	Nat	Player	Apps	Goals	Apps	Goals	Apps	Goals	Apps	Goals
Goalkeepers
1	GK	(Switzerland) SUI	Gregor Kobel	42	0	27	0	3	0	12	0
31	GK	(Germany) GER	Silas Ostrzinski	0	0	0	0	0	0	0	0
33	GK	(Germany) GER	Alexander Meyer	9	0	7+1	0	0	0	1	0
35	GK	(Poland) POL	Marcel Lotka	0	0	0	0	0	0	0	0
Defenders
2	DF	(Spain) ESP	Mateu Morey	3	0	2+1	0	0	0	0	0
4	DF	(Germany) GER	Nico Schlotterbeck	48	2	32+1	2	2+1	0	11+1	0
5	DF	(Algeria) ALG	Ramy Bensebaini	25	0	11+6	0	1+2	0	4+1	0
15	DF	(Germany) GER	Mats Hummels	40	4	20+5	3	2	0	13	1
17	DF	(Germany) GER	Marius Wolf	31	0	12+10	0	2+1	0	3+3	0
22	DF	(Netherlands) NED	Ian Maatsen	23	3	15+1	2	0	0	7	1
25	DF	(Germany) GER	Niklas Süle	32	1	14+9	1	2	0	5+2	0
26	DF	(Norway) NOR	Julian Ryerson	33	4	20+1	4	3	0	9	0
Midfielders
6	MF	(Turkey) TUR	Salih Özcan	33	0	12+10	0	2	0	4+5	0
8	MF	(Germany) GER	Felix Nmecha	29	2	10+10	1	0+1	0	3+5	1
19	MF	(Germany) GER	Julian Brandt	47	10	26+6	7	2+1	1	9+3	2
20	MF	(Austria) AUT	Marcel Sabitzer	40	6	23+2	4	2+1	1	11+1	1
23	MF	(Germany) GER	Emre Can	38	2	22+3	2	2	0	11	0
30	MF	(Germany) GER	Ole Pohlmann	2	0	0+2	0	0	0	0	0
32	MF	(Guinea) GUI	Abdoulaye Kamara	0	0	0	0	0	0	0	0
38	MF	(Germany) GER	Kjell Wätjen	2	0	0+2	0	0	0	0	0
47	MF	(Germany) GER	Antonios Papadopoulos	2	0	1+1	0	0	0	0	0
Forwards
9	FW	(Ivory Coast) CIV	Sébastien Haller	19	3	5+9	0	1	2	0+4	1
10	FW	(England) ENG	Jadon Sancho	21	3	11+3	2	0	0	7	1
11	FW	(Germany) GER	Marco Reus	42	9	18+8	6	2+1	1	5+8	2
14	FW	(Germany) GER	Niclas Füllkrug	43	15	27+2	12	0+1	0	12+1	3
16	FW	(Belgium) BEL	Julien Duranville	2	0	0+2	0	0	0	0	0
18	FW	(Germany) GER	Youssoufa Moukoko	27	6	4+16	5	2+1	1	0+4	0
21	FW	(Netherlands) NED	Donyell Malen	38	15	21+6	13	1+2	1	6+2	1
27	FW	(Germany) GER	Karim Adeyemi	34	5	10+11	3	1	0	8+4	2
43	FW	(England) ENG	Jamie Bynoe-Gittens	35	2	14+12	1	2	0	2+5	1
48	FW	(Germany) GER	Samuel Bamba	2	0	0+2	0	0	0	0	0
Players transferred out during the season
7	MF	(United States) USA	Giovanni Reyna	14	0	1+10	0	1	0	0+2	0
10	MF	(Belgium) BEL	Thorgan Hazard	1	0	0+1	0	0	0	0	0
24	DF	(Belgium) BEL	Thomas Meunier	8	0	7+1	0	0	0	0	0
42	DF	(Germany) GER	Hendry Blank	1	0	0+1	0	0	0	0	0

Source: Competitions

=== Goalscorers ===
Rank	Pos.	No.	Nat.	Player	Bundesliga	DFB-Pokal	Champions League	Total
1	FW	14	(Germany)	Niclas Füllkrug	12	0	3	15
1	FW	21	(Netherlands)	Donyell Malen	13	1	1	15
3	MF	19	(Germany)	Julian Brandt	7	1	2	10
4	FW	11	(Germany)	Marco Reus	6	1	2	9
5	MF	20	(Austria)	Marcel Sabitzer	4	1	1	6
5	FW	18	(Germany)	Youssoufa Moukoko	5	1	0	6
7	FW	27	(Germany)	Karim Adeyemi	3	0	2	5
8	DF	26	(Norway)	Julian Ryerson	4	0	0	4
8	DF	15	(Germany)	Mats Hummels	3	0	1	4
10	FW	9	(Ivory Coast)	Sébastien Haller	0	2	1	3
10	FW	10	(England)	Jadon Sancho	2	0	1	3
10	DF	22	(Netherlands)	Ian Maatsen	2	0	1	3
13	FW	43	(England)	Jamie Bynoe-Gittens	1	0	1	2
13	DF	4	(Germany)	Nico Schlotterbeck	2	0	0	2
13	MF	23	(Germany)	Emre Can	2	0	0	2
13	MF	8	(Germany)	Felix Nmecha	1	0	1	2
17	DF	25	(Germany)	Niklas Süle	1	0	0	1
Own goals					0	0	0	0
Totals					68	7	17	92

=== Assists ===
Rank	Pos.	No.	Nat.	Player	Bundesliga	DFB-Pokal	Champions League	Total
1	MF	19	(Germany)	Julian Brandt	11	1	2	14
2	FW	14	(Germany)	Niclas Füllkrug	8	0	2	10
3	MF	20	(Austria)	Marcel Sabitzer	3	1	5	9
4	FW	11	(Germany)	Marco Reus	6	0	1	7
5	FW	43	(England)	Jamie Bynoe-Gittens	3	1	0	4
6	FW	21	(Netherlands)	Donyell Malen	1	2	0	3
6	DF	4	(Germany)	Nico Schlotterbeck	1	0	2	3
8	MF	8	(Germany)	Felix Nmecha	2	0	0	2
8	MF	23	(Germany)	Emre Can	2	0	0	2
8	DF	22	(Netherlands)	Ian Maatsen	2	0	0	2
8	FW	27	(Germany)	Karim Adeyemi	1	0	1	2
8	FW	10	(England)	Jadon Sancho	2	0	0	2
13	MF	17	(Germany)	Marius Wolf	1	0	0	1
13	DF	26	(Norway)	Julian Ryerson	1	0	0	1
13	FW	9	(Ivory Coast)	Sébastien Haller	1	0	0	1
13	DF	15	(Germany)	Mats Hummels	0	0	1	1
13	MF	38	(Germany)	Kjell Wätjen	1	0	0	1
Totals					47	6	14	67
