= Samuel Bamba =

German footballer (born 2004)

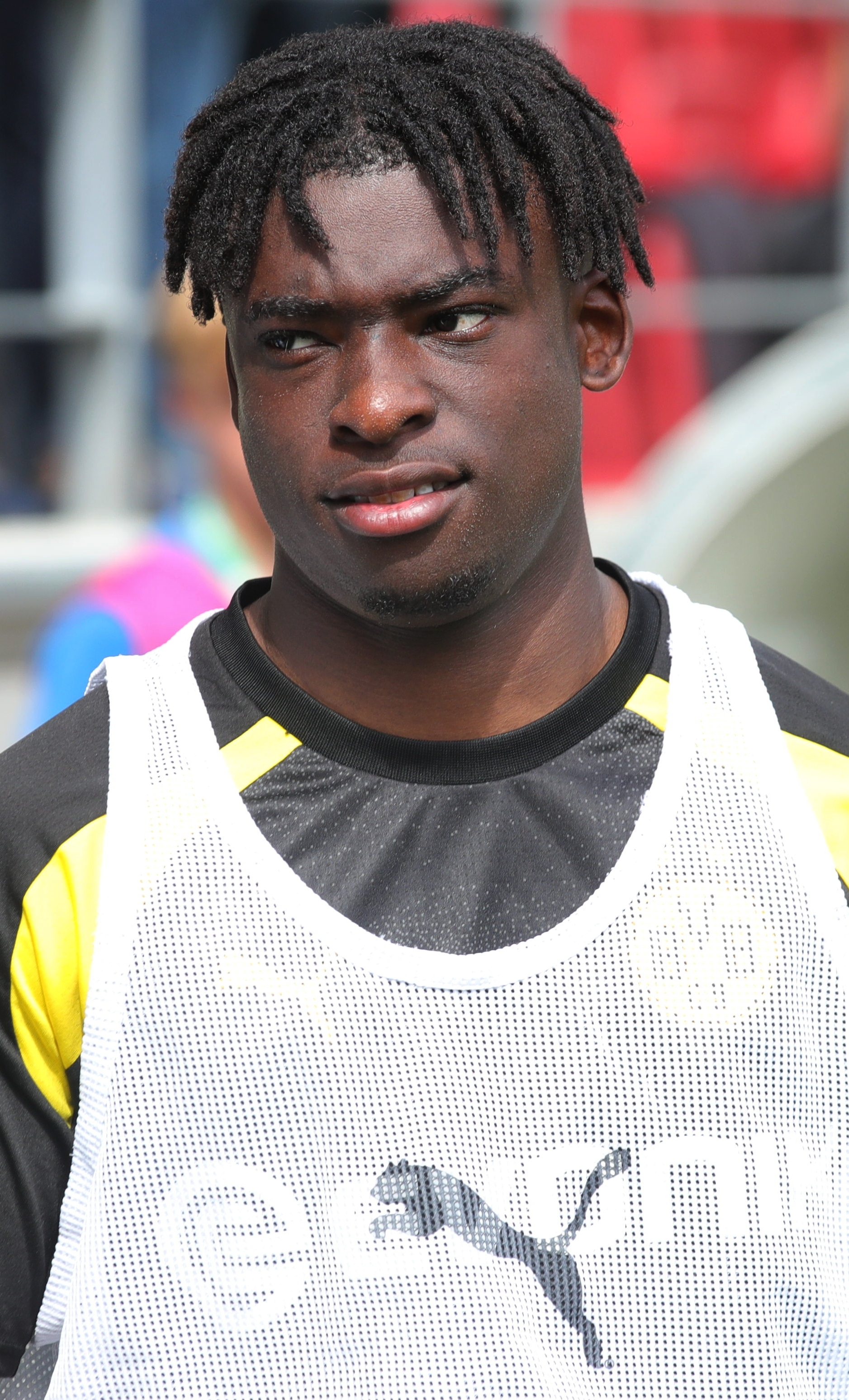
- Bamba with Borussia Dortmund in 2023

Personal information
- Date of birth: 13 February 2004 (age 22)
- Place of birth: Ahlen, Germany
- Height: 1.79 m (5 ft 10 in)
- Position: Winger

Team information
- Current team: Marítimo
- Number: 27

Youth career
- 2009–2013: Rot Weiss Ahlen
- 2013–2023: Borussia Dortmund

Senior career*
| Years | Team | Apps | (Gls) |
| 2023–2024 | Borussia Dortmund II | 22 | (1) |
| 2023–2024 | Borussia Dortmund | 2 | (0) |
| 2024–2026 | VfL Bochum | 5 | (0) |
| 2024–2025 | → VfL Bochum II | 3 | (0) |
| 2025–2026 | → Willem II (loan) | 27 | (0) |
| 2026– | Marítimo | 0 | (0) |

International career^{‡}
| 2019 | Germany U15 | 2 | (0) |
| 2019–2020 | Germany U16 | 5 | (0) |
| 2020 | Germany U17 | 1 | (0) |
| 2021 | Germany U18 | 5 | (0) |
- * Club domestic league appearances and goals as of 23 May 2026 ‡ National team caps and goals as of 17:30, 16 December 2023 (UTC)

Samuel Bamba (born 13 February 2004) is a German professional footballer who plays as a winger for Primeira Liga club Marítimo.

== Club career ==
Bamba began playing football with the youth academy of Rot Weiss Ahlen, and after four years there moved to the youth academy of Borussia Dortmund at the age of 9. In September 2021, he extended his youth contract with Borussia Dortmund until 2024. He worked his way up their youth categories, appearing for their U19s in March 2023. He made his professional debut with Borussia Dortmund II in a 1–0 3. Liga win over SpVgg Bayreuth on 20 May 2023.

On 12 June 2024, Bamba signed a three-year contract with VfL Bochum.

On 29 August 2025, Bamba joined Dutch Eerste Divisie club Willem II on loan.

On 30 July 2026, Bamba moved to Marítimo in the Portuguese top tier.

== International career ==
Born in Germany, Bamba is of Congolese descent. He is a youth international for Germany, having played up to the Germany U20s.

== Personal life ==
Bamba is the son of the DR Congolese footballer Musemestre Bamba.

== Career statistics ==
As of match played 29 August 2025

Appearances and goals by club, season and competition
| Club | Season | League | | | DFB-Pokal | | Europe | | Other | | Total | |
| Club | Season | Division | Apps | Goals | Apps | Goals | Apps | Goals | Apps | Goals | Apps | Goals |
|---|---|---|---|---|---|---|---|---|---|---|---|---|
| Borussia Dortmund II | 2022–23 | 3. Liga | 1 | 0 | — | | — | | — | | 1 | 0 |
| Borussia Dortmund II | 2023–24 | 3. Liga | 21 | 1 | — | | — | | — | | 21 | 1 |
| Borussia Dortmund II | Total | | 22 | 1 | 0 | 0 | 0 | 0 | 0 | 0 | 22 | 1 |
| Borussia Dortmund | 2023–24 | Bundesliga | 2 | 0 | 0 | 0 | 0 | 0 | — | | 2 | 0 |
| VfL Bochum II | 2024–25 | Oberliga Westfalen | 3 | 0 | — | | — | | — | | 3 | 0 |
| VfL Bochum | 2024–25 | Bundesliga | 5 | 0 | 1 | 0 | — | | — | | 6 | 0 |
| VfL Bochum | 2025–26 | 2. Bundesliga | 0 | 0 | 1 | 1 | — | | — | | 1 | 1 |
| VfL Bochum | Total | | 5 | 0 | 2 | 1 | 0 | 0 | 0 | 0 | 7 | 1 |
| Willem II (loan) | 2025–26 | Eerste Divisie | 0 | 0 | 0 | 0 | — | | — | | 0 | 0 |
| Career total | | | 32 | 1 | 2 | 1 | 0 | 0 | 0 | 0 | 34 | 2 |
