= Marco Reus =

German footballer (born 1989)

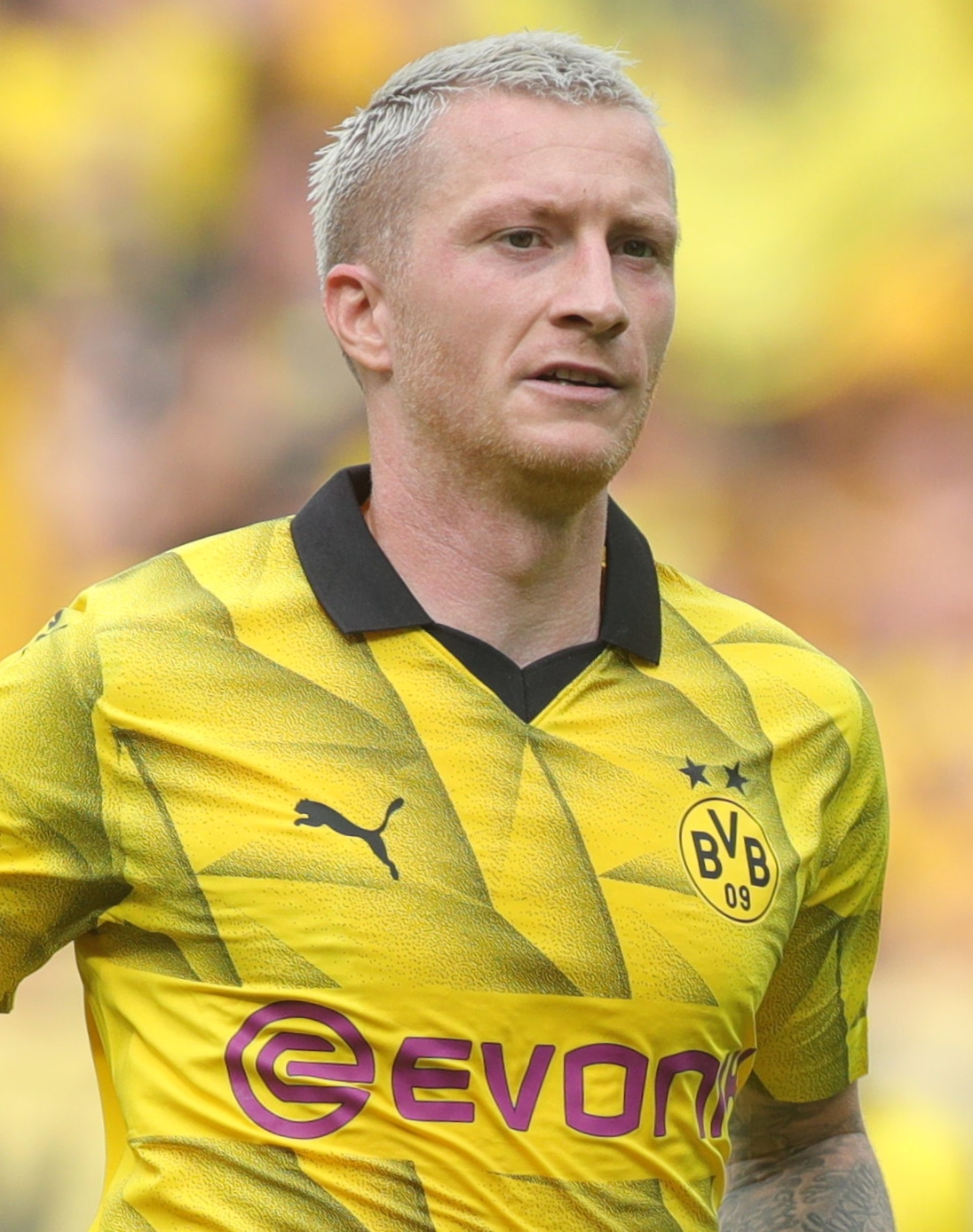
- Reus with Borussia Dortmund in 2023

Personal information
- Full name: Marco Reus
- Date of birth: 31 May 1989 (age 37)
- Place of birth: Dortmund, West Germany
- Height: 1.80 m (5 ft 11 in)
- Positions: Attacking midfielder; forward

Team information
- Current team: LA Galaxy
- Number: 18

Youth career
- 1994–1996: Post SV Dortmund
- 1996–2006: Borussia Dortmund

Senior career*
Years	Team	Apps	(Gls)
2006–2007	Rot Weiss Ahlen II	6	(3)
2007–2009	Rot Weiss Ahlen	43	(5)
2009–2012	Borussia Mönchengladbach	97	(36)
2012–2024	Borussia Dortmund	294	(120)
2024–	LA Galaxy	58	(14)

International career
2009	Germany U21	2	(0)
2011–2021	Germany	48	(15)
Medal record
Men's football
Representing Germany
UEFA European Championship
Bronze medal – third place	2012
- * Club domestic league appearances and goals as of 23:58, 7 November 2026 (UTC)

Marco Reus (German pronunciation: [ˈmaʁkoː ˈʁɔʏs]; born 31 May 1989) is a German professional footballer who plays as a forward or attacking midfielder for Major League Soccer club LA Galaxy.

Reus spent his youth career at Borussia Dortmund, prior to leaving for Rot Weiss Ahlen. He joined Borussia Mönchengladbach in 2009, and had his most successful season at the club in 2012, scoring 18 goals and providing 12 assists in the Bundesliga to help Borussia Mönchengladbach secure a place in the following season's UEFA Champions League.

Reus returned to his hometown club and back-to-back Bundesliga winners Borussia Dortmund after the 2011–12 season. With the club, Reus won the DFB-Pokal in 2017 and 2021, the DFL-Supercup in 2013 and 2019, and reached the Champions League final in 2013 and 2024, coming in both his first and last season as a member of the side. He also finished Bundesliga runner-up seven times during his twelve-year stint, and served as club captain from 2018 until 2023. Reus scored 170 goals with 132 assists for Borussia Dortmund across all competitions, and he is one of only three players (after Andreas Möller and Thomas Müller) to reach the landmark of 100 Bundesliga goals and 100 assists each. He was voted German Footballer of the Year twice, as well as Bundesliga Player of the Season on three occasions. With more than 200 goals scored throughout his career, Reus is considered one of the most prolific midfielders of this century, and one of Borussia Dortmund's best ever players.

After his contract at Dortmund expired at the end of the 2023–24 season, Reus signed for Major League Soccer side LA Galaxy in August 2024 on a deal until the end of 2026, leaving Dortmund after twelve years, as well as Germany for the first time in his career. Four months after signing for the Galaxy, Reus lifted the MLS Cup, his first trophy with the club.

Reus earned 48 caps for the Germany national team. He represented them at two major tournaments (Euro 2012 and the 2018 World Cup), but also missed three FIFA World Cups (2010, 2014, 2022) and two UEFA European Championships (2016, 2020) due to physical reasons.

== Club career ==
=== Rot Weiss Ahlen ===
Reus was born in Dortmund, North Rhine-Westphalia. He began to play football for his hometown club Post SV Dortmund in 1994 and joined the youth ranks of Borussia Dortmund in 1996. He played for Borussia Dortmund until he left for the U-19 team of Rot Weiss Ahlen in the summer of 2006. During his first year there, he played as an attacking midfielder and was featured in six games for the club's second team, which played in the Westphalia league at the time. He scored a goal in each of his first two games. The following year, he was able to break into Ahlen's first team, which played in the then German third division, today's fourth tier Regionalliga Nord. He would wear the number 47 that season. Reus featured in 16 games that season, two of which he started. His only goal came on the last matchday, where he played the full 90 minutes for the first time that season, and propelled the team to promotion into the 2. Bundesliga. In 2008–09, as a 19-year-old, he had his definitive breakthrough as a professional football player, playing 27 games and scoring four goals, while playing in the shirt number 18.

=== Borussia Mönchengladbach ===
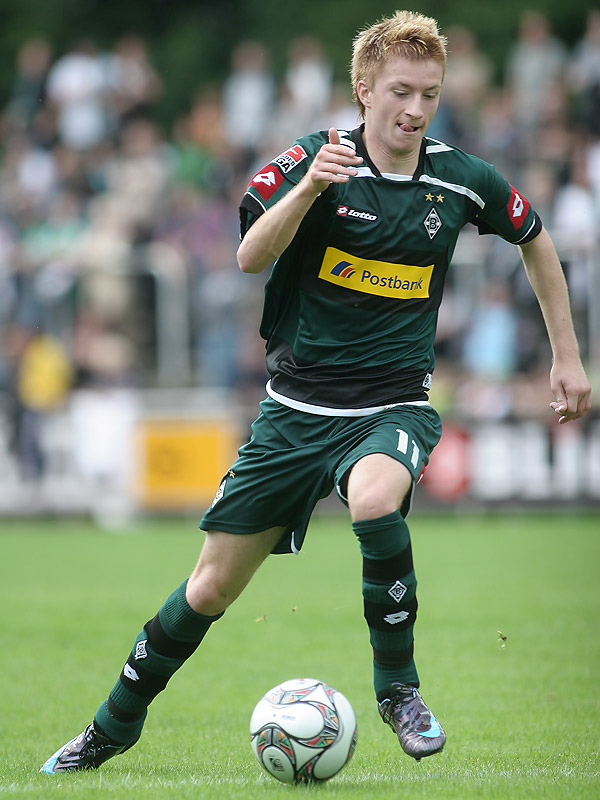
Reus playing for Borussia Mönchengladbach in 2009

On 25 May 2009, Reus signed a four-year contract with Bundesliga club Borussia Mönchengladbach, receiving the shirt number 11. On 28 August, he scored his first Bundesliga goal in a game against Mainz 05 after a 50-metre solo run, and since then became a prolific goalscorer for his club under Lucien Favre.

On 20 August 2010, Reus scored his first Bundesliga brace in an eventual loss against Mainz 05.

At the start of the 2011–12 season, Reus began the season in fine form, scoring 10 goals in his first 13 matches, including his first ever Bundesliga hat-trick in a 5–0 win against Werder Bremen on 19 November. His contract with Gladbach was set to expire in 2015 and reportedly had a buy-out clause of €18 million. Reus mentioned that his role model was Tomáš Rosický, who played for Borussia Dortmund, Reus' city of birth and former club.

=== Borussia Dortmund ===
==== 2012–13 season ====
On 4 January 2012, Reus signed with his former club Borussia Dortmund for a €17.1 million transfer fee on a five-year deal. He spoke about his transfer saying, "I've made the decision to take the next step forward in the coming season. I'd like to play for a club who can challenge for the league title and guarantee me Champions League football. I see this chance in Dortmund." Reus officially re-joined Dortmund on 1 July, keeping his shirt number 11 from Gladbach days. In his league debut with Dortmund on 24 August, he scored a goal as his new side completed a 2–1 win over Werder Bremen. On 29 September, Reus scored two goals for Dortmund in a 5–0 rout of his former club Mönchengladbach, pushing the champions to the top of the Bundesliga table through six games.

On 3 October, in Reus' second ever Champions League appearance, he opened the scoring as Dortmund earned a 1–1 draw away to Manchester City. He then opened the scoring for the German champions in their 2–2 draw with Real Madrid at the Santiago Bernabéu Stadium on 6 November, netting on a spectacular volley against Iker Casillas, after a kick-down from teammate Robert Lewandowski. In Dortmund's following Champions League match, on 21 November, Reus scored Dortmund's first goal in a 4–1 victory over Ajax at the Amsterdam Arena, securing qualification for the Round of 16 as Group D winners.

On 16 February 2013, Reus scored a hat-trick, netting all the goals in Dortmund's thumping of Hessian side Eintracht Frankfurt. On 9 April 2013, Reus scored an injury time goal which was a vital one in the stunning injury time comeback against Malaga in the quarter-final second leg of the UEFA Champions League. Dortmund won the match by 3–2 and progressed on to the next round where they defeated Real Madrid 4–3 on aggregate to reach the final. On 11 May, Reus scored a late brace against VfL Wolfsburg to help Dortmund draw the match after being two goals down. In the final against Bayern Munich at Wembley Stadium, he managed to earn a penalty for Dortmund after he was fouled by Dante, which İlkay Gündoğan managed to score from the penalty, but Bayern went to win the trophy due to a late goal by Arjen Robben.

==== 2013–14 season ====
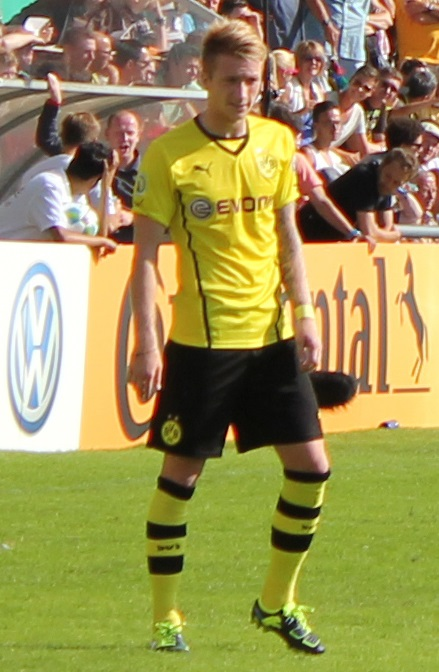
Reus playing for Borussia Dortmund in 2013

On 27 July 2013, in the 2013 DFL-Supercup against Bayern Munich, Reus netted the game's opening goal and later rounded off the scoring, as Borussia Dortmund claimed a 4–2 victory to lift the trophy. On 18 August, Reus converted a penalty kick which rounded off the scoring as Dortmund defeated Eintracht Braunschweig 2–1 at the Signal Iduna Park in the second game of Dortmund's 2013–14 league campaign. He then scored a brace against SC Freiburg, one from the penalty spot, and started the season hitting impressive form. Reus had confirmed he would be Dortmund's penalty taker for the season, though despite winning a penalty against 1860 Munich in the DFB Pokal, he allowed teammate Pierre-Emerick Aubameyang in taking the penalty which propelled the Borussia-based club into the next round of the competition. On 1 November, Reus scored a goal for Dortmund in a 6–1 league win against VfB Stuttgart.

On 25 February 2014, Reus scored a goal in a 4–2 win for Dortmund against Zenit Saint Petersburg in the first leg of the round of 16 in the UEFA Champions League. On 29 March, he then scored a hat-trick in a 3–2 win for Dortmund against Stuttgart in the Bundesliga. On 8 April, Reus scored twice in Dortmund's second leg 2–0 win against Real Madrid, though Dortmund were eventually knocked out of the competition after losing 3–2 on aggregate. Reus finished the season with 23 goals and 18 assists in all competitions.

==== 2014–15 season ====
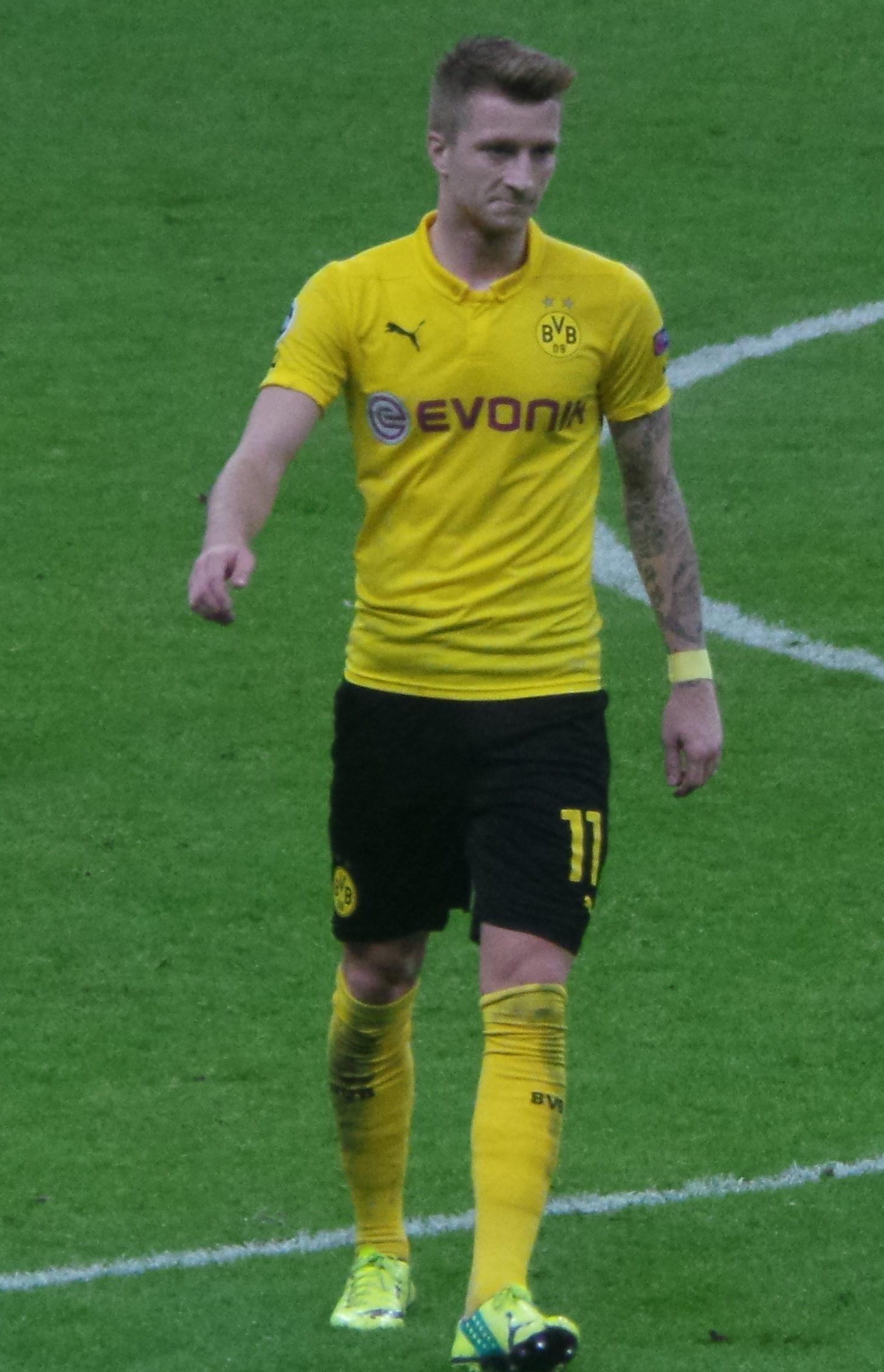
Reus playing for Borussia Dortmund in 2014

At the beginning of the season, Reus was not part of the squad that won the 2014 DFL-Supercup with 2–0 over Bayern Munich, due to the lack of fitness after having returned from a partial tear of the syndesmosis.

In the second match of the 2014–15 Bundesliga against FC Augsburg, Reus scored one goal and helped set up another. Dortmund went to win the match by 3–2. In September 2014, he was diagnosed with an ankle injury. On 22 October, having returned from injury, Reus contributed a goal and assist in their 4–0 Champions League group stage away win against Galatasaray. On 1 November, he scored the only goal for Dortmund in their 2–1 away loss against their rivals Bayern Munich.

Despite prior injury concerns, Reus started Dortmund's match away to SC Paderborn on 22 November and scored to put them 2–0 up. He was stretchered off in the second half, however, after which Paderborn equalised for a final score of 2–2. The injury ruled him out until January 2015. On 10 February, Reus signed a contract extension with Dortmund, keeping him at the club until 2019. With Dortmund he would reach the DFB-Pokal final, after a victory on penalties against Bayern in the semis. Reus and his team would lose 3–1 against league runner-up Wolfsburg at Olympiastadion, failing to win his third final with the club and thus his first major trophy.

==== 2015–16 season ====
On 5 August 2015, Reus scored a goal in Borussia Dortmund's 5–0 win against Wolfsberger AC to advance into the 2015–16 Europa League play-off round. On 15 August, he then opened the 2015–16 league campaign with a goal and an assist in a 4–0 home win against his former club Borussia Mönchengladbach. On 28 August, he scored a hat-trick in their 7–2 home win against Odds BK to qualify for the 2015–16 UEFA Europa League. Reus and Dortmund would be knocked out of the Europa League in April 2016 by Liverpool in the quarterfinals, in a late 4–3 loss (5–4 on aggregate) at Anfield, in which he scored in the 57th minute to make it 3–1 (4–2 on aggregate), after leading the second leg match twice by a two goal difference, failing to qualify for the semi-final of the competition.

On 20 April 2016, Reus was one of three goalscorers as Borussia won 3–0 away at Hertha BSC in the semi-final of the DFB-Pokal. He finished the 2015–16 season with total of 23 goals and 8 assists in 43 appearances. Around this time, Reus became part of a collaboration between the German Football Association and The LEGO Group, who in May 2016 released a Europe-exclusive collectible minifigure series, with Reus featured as the thirteenth of sixteen minifigures in the collection.

==== 2016–17 season ====
After being sidelined due to injury, Reus made his return on 22 November 2016. He scored twice and assisted once in a historic 8–4 Champions league group stage win against Legia Warsaw. Reus took the game ball for it was originally a hat-trick game by him, as he also assisted an own-goal deflected by Warsaw player Jakub Rzeźniczak, which was supposed to be a shot on the goal. On 3 December, he assisted three goals in their 4–1 win against his former club Borussia Mönchengladbach. Four days later, Reus scored the late equaliser in a 2–2 draw against Real Madrid; Dortmund subsequently advanced to the round 16 as the winners of Group F, ahead of Madrid. On 19 April 2017, Reus scored in the delayed second leg Champions League quarterfinals match in a 3–1 (6–3 on aggregate) loss against AS Monaco, failing to qualify for the final four of the competition, after having been attacked in a team bus assassination a week prior.

During the 2017 DFB-Pokal Final, Reus suffered a partial cruciate ligament tear and was substituted at halftime. Dortmund went on to win the match, giving Reus his first major trophy. The initial prognosis suggested that he would miss "several" months.

==== 2017–18 season ====
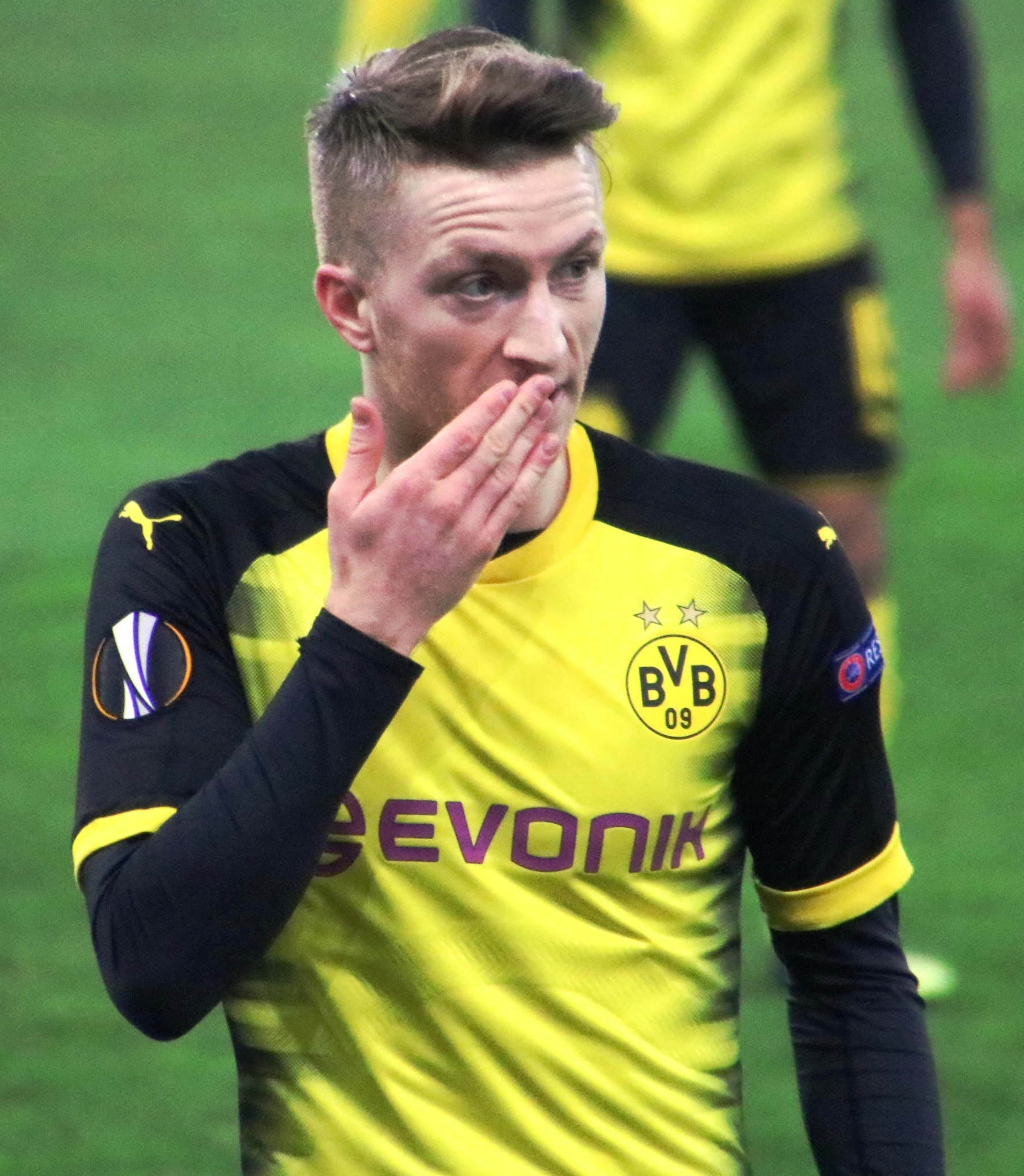
Reus with Borussia Dortmund in 2018

On 10 February 2018, Reus recovered from the ligament damage and made his return against Hamburg in the Bundesliga. Reus scored his first goal since his return from injury and the only goal in the match against his former club Borussia Mönchengladbach in a 1–0 victory. Reus scored Dortmund's only goal in two consecutive matches against Augsburg and RB Leipzig in which both the matches ended in a 1–1 draw. On 9 March, Reus extended his contract with the club until 30 June 2023. On 21 April, Reus scored twice in a 4–0 win over Bayer Leverkusen, where he also missed a penalty. On 29 April, Reus scored a 19th-minute goal in Dortmund's 1–1 draw with Werder Bremen. On 12 May, Reus scored the only goal for the team in Dortmund's 3–1 loss to Hoffenheim. Reus finished the season with 7 goals in 15 appearances in all competitions.

==== 2018–19 season ====
Prior to the start of the 2018–19 season, Reus was made club captain by incoming coach Lucien Favre, who also used to be his coach during his time at Mönchengladbach. On 21 August 2018, Reus scored the winning goal in extra time to help his side earn a 2–1 victory over SpVgg Greuther Fürth in the DFB-Pokal first round match. Reus scored a 90th-minute goal which was his 100th Bundesliga goal as Dortmund defeated RB Leipzig with a 4–1 victory. On 27 September, he scored two goals including his 100th goal for Borussia Dortmund across all competitions in a 7–0 victory over 1. FC Nürnberg.

On 10 November 2018, he scored back to back goals in the second half of Der Klassiker against Bayern Munich as Dortmund came from behind to win the match 3–2. The game kept Dortmund on top of the Bundesliga table, 7 points ahead of Bayern Munich. Reus ended the season with 21 goals and 14 assists in all competitions, and was voted the 2019 Germany Footballer of the year.

==== 2019–2024 ====
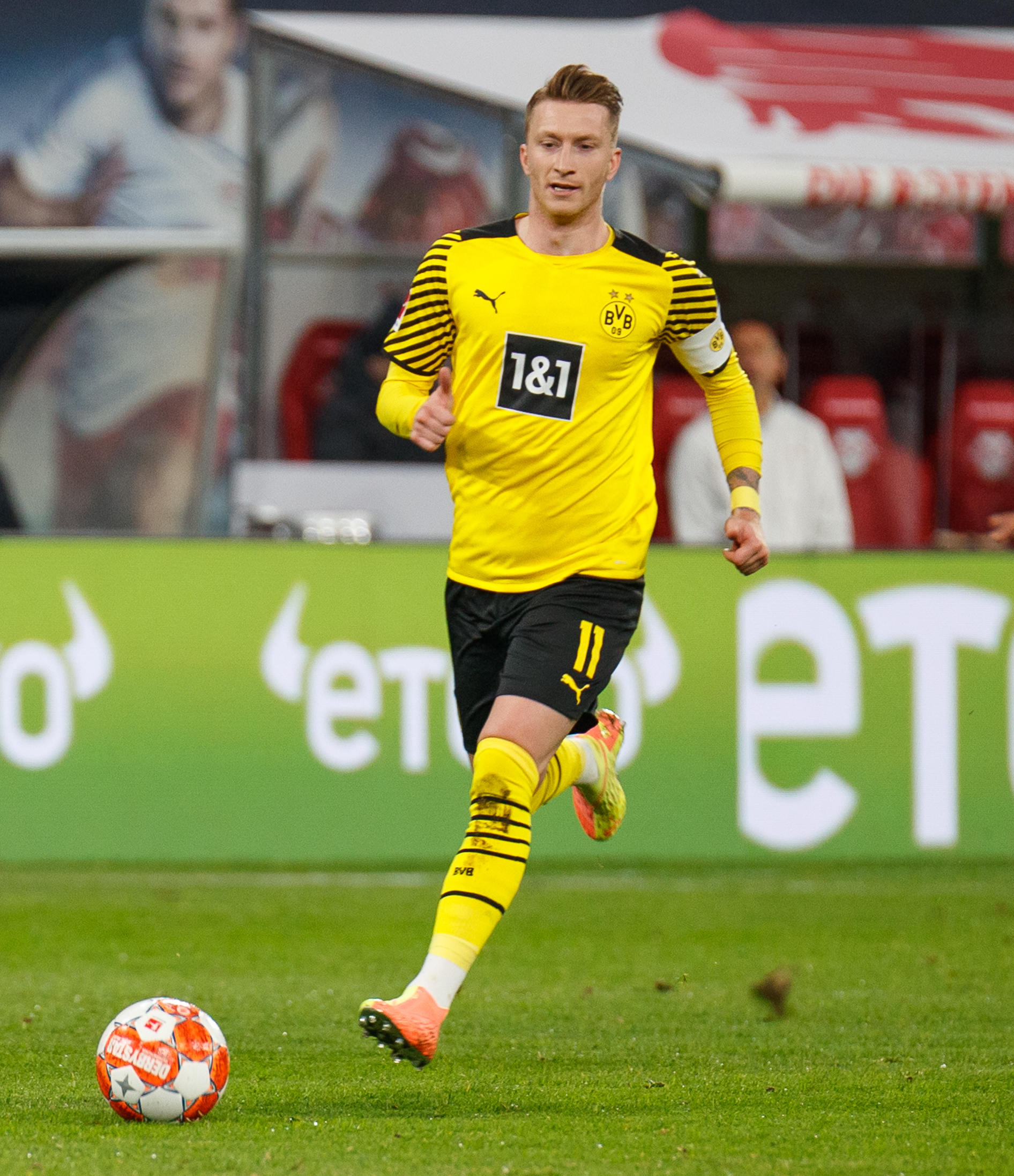
Reus playing for Borussia Dortmund in 2021

At the beginning of the 2019–20 season, Reus and his team would defeat rivals Bayern Munich in a 2–0 victory at the 2019 DFL-Supercup, marking his second win of that competition.

By February 2020, Reus had 26 appearances in all competitions, in which he scored 12 goals. However, a muscle injury kept him out for the rest of the season.

On 6 April 2021, Reus scored in a 1–2 loss to Manchester City in the 2020–21 UEFA Champions League quarter-finals, to become Dortmund's all-time Champions League top scorer with 18 goals. He would go on to win the DFB-Pokal for a second time in his career by the end of that season, after a one-sided 4–1 victory over RB Leipzig, being involved in all goals, providing two assists to Erling Haaland and Jadon Sancho each.

On 13 February 2022, Reus scored his 150th goal for Borussia Dortmund in all competitions in a 3–0 win at Union Berlin.

On 3 March 2023, Reus scored in a 2–1 victory over RB Leipzig, to become the joint second all-time goalscorer for Borussia Dortmund along with Michael Zorc with 159 goals. On 18 March, he scored a brace in a 6–1 win over 1. FC Köln, to reach his 150th Bundesliga goal, and to become the lone second top scorer for his club with 161 goals, only behind Alfred Preissler with 177 goals. On 27 April, Reus signed a one-year contract extension until 2024. Reus and his team would end up Bundesliga runner-up, after merely drawing 2–2 on the last matchday against 1. FSV Mainz 05 and missing two crucial points. This season would mark the closest Reus has ever been to winning a league title with Borussia Dortmund, as both Bayern and Dortmund ended their season with 71 points, while the latter team came short in terms of goal-difference. Jamal Musiala would score the 2–1 winner in the 89th minute for Bayern against BVB-friends 1. FC Köln, costing Reus his first ever league title.

On 6 July 2023, Reus announced that he would step down as club captain for the 2023–24 season. On 1 November, Reus scored the winner in a 1–0 home victory over TSG Hoffenheim in the DFB-Pokal, helping his team advance to the next round. Three days later, Reus played in his 400th match for Borussia Dortmund in all competitions in Der Klassiker against Bayern Munich, to be the sixth player to achieve this milestone, only behind Michael Zorc, Mats Hummels, Roman Weidenfeller, Stefan Reuter and Lars Ricken. The game ended in a 4–0 loss to Dortmund, although Reus was praised for his performance. Three weeks later, Reus scored his first Champions League goal of the season in a 3–1 away victory over AC Milan in the group stage. He and his team would top Group F consisting of Paris, Milan and Newcastle in December 2024, after a 1–1 home draw over Paris. On 24 March 2024, Reus scored his second goal of that season's Champions League campaign, a second leg round of 16 match against PSV Eindhoven, which ended in a 2–0 home victory (3–1 on aggregate) for Dortmund. This would mark his 24th and last ever goal of the competition. A week later Reus would be part of a 2–0 away victory at Allianz Arena against Bayern Munich, making a crucial step towards securing Champions League spots for the following season. On 1 May 2024, Reus was part of a 1–0 home victory over Paris Saint Germain in the semi-final first leg of the Champions League. Two days later he announced his departure from Dortmund at the end of the season, after a mutual decision not to renew his contract, signaling an end of his 12-year stay at the club. On the same weekend after announcing his departure, Reus would be involved in three goals, of which he scored a chip shot assisted by debutant Kjell Wätjen who used to be his match mascot, in a 5–1 home victory over FC Augsburg. Three days later, he and his team won the second leg match in Paris, once again with 1–0, advancing to the final for the first time since 2013. On the final matchday of the 2023–24 season, he scored a free-kick goal and provided an assist in a 4–0 win over Darmstadt at the Signal Iduna Park, his last ever match on homesoil. On 1 June, in the Champions League final, he played his last match for the club against Real Madrid, who had beaten Bayern Munich prior, which ended in a 2–0 defeat for Dortmund, once again at Wembley Stadium. He would end his final season at the club with nine goals scored and eleven assists provided across all three competitions.

=== LA Galaxy ===
On 15 August 2024, Major League Soccer club LA Galaxy confirmed the signing of Reus on a two-and-a-half-year contract. As desired, he would be given the shirt number 18, an homage to his 2008–09 professional debut season, in which he wore the number for Rot Weiss Ahlen in the 2. Bundesliga.

He made his debut against Atlanta United on 24 August, scoring and assisting to win Player of the Match. On 30 November 2024, Reus was part of the starting line-up that would win 1–0 over Seattle Sounders in the MLS Western Conference final, advancing to the MLS Cup final.

On 7 December 2024, Reus and his squad won the MLS Cup with 2–1 against Eastern Conference champions New York Red Bulls for the first time in ten years, also marking his first ever league title of his professional career. He ended his first season in the United States with 11 matches played, a goal scored and three assists provided.

== International career ==
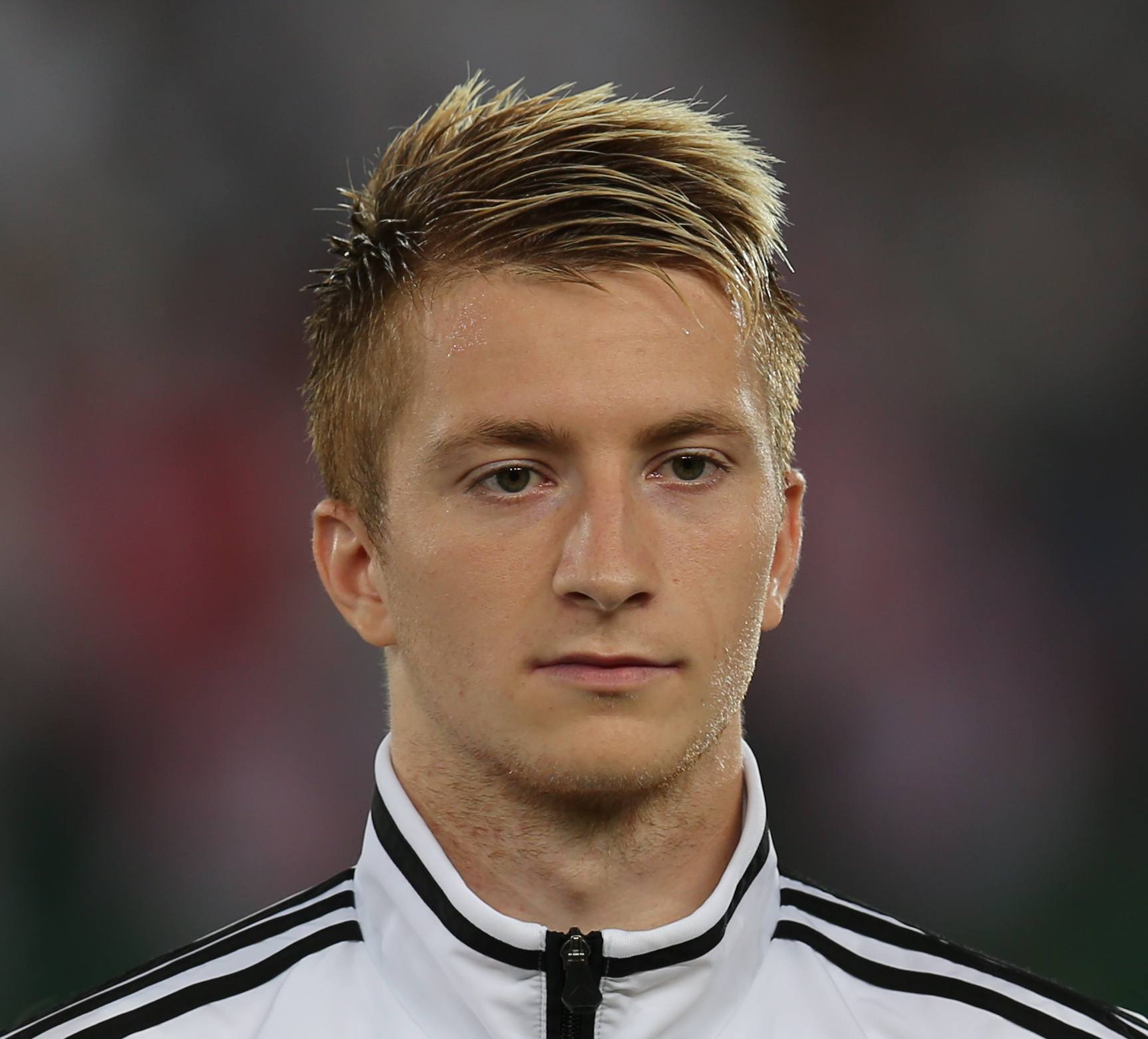
Reus with Germany in 2012

On 11 August 2009, Reus made his Germany under-21 debut in a friendly match against Turkey. On 6 May 2010, he earned his first call-up to the senior team for a friendly match against Malta on 14 May. Three days before the match, he withdrew from the squad due to a leg injury picked up in the last game of the season against Bayer Leverkusen, which forced him to miss the 2010 FIFA World Cup in South Africa. Joachim Löw would call him up again immediately after the World Cup in August, but Reus had to pass once more due to illness.

On 7 October 2011, he made his senior team debut against Turkey, receiving the shirt number 21. He scored his first goal for the team on 26 May 2012 in a 5–3 defeat to Switzerland. On 22 June, he scored in a 4–2 victory in the UEFA Euro 2012 quarter-final against Greece, his first start for Germany in a major tournament. In the semi-final, his side was defeated with 2–1 by Italy. Even though there was no match to determine the third place, Reus and his team, as well as Portugal, would be awarded a bronze medal each, for reaching the final four of the competition.

Reus established himself as a regular member of Joachim Löw's side in the 2014 FIFA World Cup qualification campaign, scoring five goals and registering three assists in six matches. He was named in Germany's squad for the World Cup finals, but was ultimately forced to withdraw after suffering an ankle injury in the team's last 6–1 warm-up win against Armenia on 6 June. Shkodran Mustafi would fill his empty spot in the squad and Reus would miss his team winning the trophy for the fourth time in their history. Reus made his international comeback in Germany's first post-World Cup friendly against Argentina on 3 September 2014, whom they had beaten in the final two months prior. From then on, Reus would wear the shirt number 11, previously worn by Miroslav Klose, who retired from the national team after the World Cup.

During qualification for UEFA Euro 2016, Reus made four appearances, scoring once in a 2–0 victory over Georgia in Tbilisi, but was not selected for the tournament after suffering a groin injury.

On 2 June 2018, Reus made his return to international duty after two years in a friendly match against Austria, which ended in a 2–1 loss for Germany. Reus was included in Joachim Löw's 23-man final squad for the 2018 FIFA World Cup on 4 June. On 17 June, Reus made his World Cup debut during their opening match against Mexico as a substitute by replacing Sami Khedira in the 60th minute, but the match ended in a 1–0 loss for Germany. On 23 June, Reus started and scored an equalizing goal and his first World Cup goal in the second half as Germany defeated Sweden with 2–1 in their second group stage match to resurrect their World Cup hopes. He also provided an assist to Toni Kroos' late winning goal in that match and was named Man of the Match. However, his side were knocked out of the tournament after losing 2–0 to South Korea in their last group stage match on 27 June.

In May 2021, Reus and Löw agreed on his decision to not participate in the postponed UEFA Euro 2020, due to post-season fatigue.

In November 2022, Reus was exempt from Hansi Flick's 2022 FIFA World Cup squad reportedly as a result of an ankle injury he suffered in a match against Schalke, which he failed to recover from in time.

In October 2023, Reus showed interest to become part of the squad to represent Germany at the UEFA Euro 2024 on homesoil, and did not rule out a participation at the tournament should there be no physical complications. Despite him being fit and registering 20 goal contributions, among the most of German players that season, Reus would not become part of Julian Nagelsmann's final squad in May 2024.

His last match for the national team remained the 9–0 home victory against Liechtenstein on 11 November 2021, a qualifier match for the 2022 FIFA World Cup in Qatar, in which he scored once and assisted twice.

== Style of play ==
Reus is renowned for his versatility, speed, agility, technical skills, intelligence, and shooting ability; however he is also known for his proneness to injury. In 2012, Franz Beckenbauer spoke about Reus, along with Mario Götze, saying, "...as a classic duo there is nobody better than the prolific Reus and Götze." Reus was voted the Footballer of the Year (Germany) in 2012 and was named in the UEFA Team of the Year in 2013. In 2013, he was ranked as the fourth best footballer in Europe by Bloomberg. Although he is highly regarded for his attacking movement, powerful finishing with either foot in open play, timing, and eye for goal, as well as his accuracy from set pieces, Reus is also a hard-working player and a precise passer, who possesses good vision, which enables him to create chances and provide assists to teammates, in addition to scoring goals himself. As such, Reus is a versatile forward, who is capable of playing in several offensive positions, and has been deployed as a second striker, in a central role as an out-and-out striker (although this is not his favoured position), as a winger on either flank (although he favours the left side, as it allows him to cut inside onto his stronger right foot), and also in a central attacking midfield role as a number 10. Beyond his qualities as a player, Reus is also known for his leadership, having served as captain of Borussia Dortmund.

== Personal life ==
Reus is named after the Netherlands legend, Marco van Basten. According to Reus, his parents were originally going to name him 'Dennis' but thanks to Van Basten's famous volley goal against Soviet Union in the final of Euro 1988 they decided to name him Marco.

Reus started dating German model Scarlett Gartmann in December 2015. Together they had their first daughter in March 2019 and got married later the same year. They welcomed their second child in January 2024.

Reus has said that, if he was not a professional football player, he would be a pilot.

Reus was the cover athlete of FIFA 17, after being voted in by a fans' poll organized by Electronic Arts.

In March 2020, Reus and his wife, Scarlett, donated €500,000 to people and smaller businesses in need in his hometown of Dortmund during the COVID-19 pandemic.

=== Legal issues ===
In December 2014, Reus was fined €540,000 for driving without a valid licence. The fine was based on his then monthly salary of €180,000. He had been driving for years with a fake Dutch licence, a felony in its own right, and had been issued speeding tickets on at least five occasions since 2011 without authorities knowing that he was not legally licensed. The felony charges for using a counterfeit licence were later dropped, causing some controversy and raising questions from politicians whether his celebrity status had been a reason for a milder sentence. When convicted, Reus said, "The reasons I did it are something I cannot really understand." Prior to his conviction, he had appeared in commercials for cars and petrol. In August 2016, Reus stated that he now had a valid driver's licence.

== Career statistics ==
=== Club ===
As of match played 7 November 2026

Appearances and goals by club, season and competition
Club	Season	League			National cup (Note: Includes DFB-Pokal)		Continental		Other		Total	
Club	Season	Division	Apps	Goals	Apps	Goals	Apps	Goals	Apps	Goals	Apps	Goals
Rot Weiss Ahlen II	2006–07	Oberliga Westfalen	5	2	—		—		—		5	2
Rot Weiss Ahlen II	2007–08	Oberliga Westfalen	1	1	—		—		—		1	1
Rot Weiss Ahlen II	Total		6	3	—		—		—		6	3
Rot Weiss Ahlen	2007–08	Regionalliga Nord	16	1	—		—		—		16	1
Rot Weiss Ahlen	2008–09	2. Bundesliga	27	4	1	0	—		—		28	4
Rot Weiss Ahlen	Total		43	5	1	0	—		—		44	5
Borussia Mönchengladbach	2009–10	Bundesliga	33	8	2	0	—		—		35	8
Borussia Mönchengladbach	2010–11	Bundesliga	32	10	3	1	—		2 (Note: Appearances in Bundesliga relegation play-offs)	1	37	12
Borussia Mönchengladbach	2011–12	Bundesliga	32	18	5	3	—		—		37	21
Borussia Mönchengladbach	Total		97	36	10	4	—		2	1	109	41
Borussia Dortmund	2012–13	Bundesliga	32	14	3	1	13 (Note: Appearances in UEFA Champions League)	4	1 (Note: Appearance in DFL-Supercup)	0	49	19
Borussia Dortmund	2013–14	Bundesliga	30	16	4	0	9	5	1	2	44	23
Borussia Dortmund	2014–15	Bundesliga	20	7	5	1	4	3	0	0	29	11
Borussia Dortmund	2015–16	Bundesliga	26	12	4	2	13 (Note: Appearances in UEFA Europa League)	9	—		43	23
Borussia Dortmund	2016–17	Bundesliga	17	7	3	2	4	4	0	0	24	13
Borussia Dortmund	2017–18	Bundesliga	11	7	0	0	4	0	0	0	15	7
Borussia Dortmund	2018–19	Bundesliga	27	17	3	3	6	1	—		36	21
Borussia Dortmund	2019–20	Bundesliga	19	11	2	1	4	0	1	0	26	12
Borussia Dortmund	2020–21	Bundesliga	32	8	6	2	10	1	1	0	49	11
Borussia Dortmund	2021–22	Bundesliga	29	9	3	0	8 (Note: Six appearances and three goals in UEFA Champions League, two appearances in UEFA Europa League)	3	1	1	41	13
Borussia Dortmund	2022–23	Bundesliga	25	6	3	1	3	1	—		31	8
Borussia Dortmund	2023–24	Bundesliga	26	6	3	1	13	2	—		42	9
Borussia Dortmund	Total		294	120	39	14	91	33	5	3	429	170
LA Galaxy	2024	MLS	6	1	—		—		5 (Note: Appearances in MLS Cup playoffs)	0	11	1
LA Galaxy	2025	MLS	21	5	—		1 (Note: Appearance(s) in CONCACAF Champions Cup)	0	6 (Note: Appearances in Leagues Cup)	3	28	8
LA Galaxy	2026	MLS	31	8	—		5	1	—		36	9
LA Galaxy	Total		58	14	—		6	1	11	3	75	18
Career total			498	178	50	18	97	34	18	7	663	237

=== International ===
As of match played 11 November 2021

Appearances and goals by national team and year
National team	Year	Apps	Goals
Germany	2011	3	0
Germany	2012	10	5
Germany	2013	6	2
Germany	2014	4	0
Germany	2015	4	2
Germany	2016	2	0
Germany	2017	0	0
Germany	2018	8	1
Germany	2019	7	3
Germany	2020	0	0
Germany	2021	4	2
Total		48	15

As of match played 11 November 2021
Germany score listed first, score column indicates score after each Reus goal

List of international goals scored by Marco Reus
No.	Date	Venue	Opponent	Score	Result	Competition
1	26 May 2012	St. Jakob-Park, Basel, Switzerland	Switzerland	3–5	3–5	Friendly
2	22 June 2012	PGE Arena Gdańsk, Gdańsk, Poland	Greece	4–1	4–2	UEFA Euro 2012
3	11 September 2012	Ernst-Happel-Stadion, Vienna, Austria	Austria	1–0	2–1	2014 FIFA World Cup qualification
4	12 October 2012	Aviva Stadium, Dublin, Ireland	Republic of Ireland	1–0	6–1	2014 FIFA World Cup qualification
5	12 October 2012	Aviva Stadium, Dublin, Ireland	Republic of Ireland	2–0	6–1	2014 FIFA World Cup qualification
6	26 March 2013	Frankenstadion, Nuremberg, Germany	Kazakhstan	1–0	4–1	2014 FIFA World Cup qualification
7	26 March 2013	Frankenstadion, Nuremberg, Germany	Kazakhstan	4–1	4–1	2014 FIFA World Cup qualification
8	25 March 2015	Fritz-Walter-Stadion, Kaiserslautern, Germany	Australia	1–0	2–2	Friendly
9	29 March 2015	Boris Paichadze Dinamo Arena, Tbilisi, Georgia	Georgia	1–0	2–0	UEFA Euro 2016 qualification
10	23 June 2018	Fisht Olympic Stadium, Sochi, Russia	Sweden	1–1	2–1	2018 FIFA World Cup
11	8 June 2019	Borisov Arena, Barysaw, Belarus	Belarus	2–0	2–0	UEFA Euro 2020 qualification
12	11 June 2019	Opel Arena, Mainz, Germany	Estonia	1–0	8–0	UEFA Euro 2020 qualification
13	11 June 2019	Opel Arena, Mainz, Germany	Estonia	5–0	8–0	UEFA Euro 2020 qualification
14	5 September 2021	Mercedes-Benz Arena, Stuttgart, Germany	Armenia	3–0	6–0	2022 FIFA World Cup qualification
15	11 November 2021	Volkswagen Arena, Wolfsburg, Germany	Liechtenstein	4–0	9–0	2022 FIFA World Cup qualification

== Honours ==
Rot Weiss Ahlen

- Regionalliga Nord: 2007–08

Borussia Dortmund

- DFB-Pokal: 2016–17, 2020–21; runner-up: 2013–14, 2014–15, 2015–16
- DFL-Supercup: 2013, 2014, 2019
- UEFA Champions League runner-up: 2012–13, 2023–24

LA Galaxy

- MLS Cup: 2024
- Western Conference (MLS): 2024

Individual

- VDV Player of the Season (Silver Boot): 2011–12, 2013–14, 2018–19
- Bundesliga Breakthrough of the Season: 2011–12
- Bundesliga top assist provider: 2013–14
- Bundesliga Player of the Month: September 2018, November 2018, December 2018
- Bundesliga Goal of the Month: November 2018, February 2023, May 2024
- Bundesliga Team of the Season: 2011–12, 2013–14, 2014–15, 2015–16, 2018–19
- kicker Bundesliga Team of the Season: 2011–12, 2013–14, 2018–19
- Footballer of the Year in Germany: 2012, 2019
- Germany National Player of the Year: 2018
- UEFA Team of the Year: 2013
- UEFA Champions League Team of the Season: 2013–14
- Borussia Dortmund Player of the Year: 2013–14
- Goal of the Month (Germany): January 2012, June 2012, September 2012
- ESM Team of the Season: 2018–19
