= Jamie Gittens =

English footballer (born 2004)

Personal information
- Full name: Jamie Jermaine Bynoe-Gittens
- Date of birth: 8 August 2004 (age 22)
- Place of birth: Reading, England
- Height: 5 ft 10 in (1.78 m)
- Position: Winger

Team information
- Current team: Chelsea
- Number: 11

Youth career
- Caversham Trents
- Woodley Zebras
- Reading
- Chelsea
- 2013–2018: Reading
- 2018–2020: Manchester City
- 2020–2022: Borussia Dortmund

Senior career*
Years	Team	Apps	(Gls)
2022–2025	Borussia Dortmund	76	(12)
2025–	Chelsea	16	(0)

International career^{‡}
2019	England U15	6	(0)
2019–2020	England U16	5	(1)
2022	England U18	2	(0)
2022	England U19	4	(0)
2023–	England U21	17	(2)
Medal record
Men's football
Representing England
UEFA European Under-19 Championship
Winner	2022
- * Club domestic league appearances and goals as of 22:16, 31 January 2026 (UTC) ‡ National team caps and goals as of 22:00, 25 September 2026 (UTC)

Jamie Jermaine Bynoe-Gittens (born 8 August 2004) is an English professional footballer who plays as a winger for Premier League club Chelsea.

== Club career ==
=== Early career ===
Born in Reading, Berkshire, Gittens started his career with local side Caversham Trents at the age of five, and stayed until he was seven, also playing for local club Woodley Zebras. Shortly after, he joined Reading, and also spent some time with Chelsea. At under-9 level, he chose to remain with Reading, and stayed there until under-14 level, when he chose to sign with Manchester City.

=== Borussia Dortmund ===
After two years in Manchester, Gittens moved to Germany in 2020 to sign for Borussia Dortmund. His career in Dortmund was hampered by not only the COVID-19 pandemic, but a torn ligament injury that kept him out for a number of months. However, the 2021–22 season was a much better one for Gittens; notable performances in the UEFA Youth League, where he scored six goals in four games, including two against Manchester United, earned him a call-up to Marco Rose's first team squad.

Gittens made his Bundesliga debut in a 6–1 win over VfL Wolfsburg on 16 April 2022. On 12 August 2022, he scored his first Bundesliga goal in a 3–1 away win against SC Freiburg. On 16 August, he signed a new contract until June 2025. On 15 February 2023, he made his Champions League debut, coming off the bench in the 79th minute in a 1–0 win over Chelsea in the round of 16 first leg.

On 28 November 2023, Gittens scored his first Champions League goal and provided an assist in a 3–1 away win over Milan, securing qualification to the knockout phase. Dortmund went on to reach the 2024 UEFA Champions League final at Wembley, in which Gittens appeared as a late substitute replacing his countryman Jadon Sancho in the 87th minute. After struggling with injuries in his first two seasons, the 2023–24 season was Gittens' first at Dortmund where he remained injury free, making 25 appearances in the Bundesliga.

In August 2024, Dortmund announced that he would play under the surname "Gittens", rather than "Bynoe-Gittens" as he had previously used. Gittens explained that his father had suggested it as it is shorter, although both parts of the name come from his father. On the opening day of the 2024–25 Bundesliga, Gittens scored twice as a substitute to give Dortmund a 2–0 win over Eintracht Frankfurt, in new coach Nuri Şahin's first league game. In the opening game of Dortmund's 2024–25 Champions League campaign, Gittens again came off the bench to score twice and was named man of the match in a 3–0 win away to Club Brugge. Hence, he became the second-youngest player to achieve this feat in the competition, behind only David Trezeguet in 1997.

=== Chelsea ===
Gittens signed for Premier League club Chelsea on 5 July 2025 on a seven-year contract for a fee of £48.5 million, with £3.5 million to potentially be paid in add-ons. However, he was ineligible for the 2025 FIFA Club World Cup, having already featured in the tournament with Dortmund. He made his Premier League debut in a goalless draw with Crystal Palace on 17 August. On 29 October, he scored his first goal in a 4–3 away win over Wolverhampton Wanderers in the EFL Cup.

== International career ==
Gittens has represented England at numerous youth levels. He is of Barbadian descent and is a dual citizen.

On 17 June 2022, Gittens was included in the England U19 squad for the 2022 UEFA European Under-19 Championship. He made his U19 debut as an 80th-minute substitute during England's opening game of the tournament, a 2–0 victory over Austria in Banská Bystrica, Slovakia. He made his first start at this age level in their next group game against Serbia and received praise for his performance in the semi-final against Italy. Gittens started in the final as England won the tournament with a 3–1 extra time victory over Israel on 1 July 2022.

On 11 September 2023, Gittens made his England U21 debut as a substitute during a 3–0 2025 UEFA European Under-21 Championship qualification win away to Luxembourg.

== Personal life ==
Gittens is the son of Michael Bynoe-Gittens, a Barbadian cricket player. Gittens holds both British and Barbadian citizenship.

== Career statistics ==
As of match played 9 September 2026

Appearances and goals by club, season and competition
Club	Season	League			National cup (Note: Includes DFB-Pokal, FA Cup)		League cup (Note: Includes EFL Cup)		Europe		Other		Total	
Club	Season	Division	Apps	Goals	Apps	Goals	Apps	Goals	Apps	Goals	Apps	Goals	Apps	Goals
Borussia Dortmund	2021–22	Bundesliga	4	0	0	0	—		0	0	0	0	4	0
Borussia Dortmund	2022–23	Bundesliga	15	3	3	0	—		2 (Note: Appearances in UEFA Champions League)	0	—		20	3
Borussia Dortmund	2023–24	Bundesliga	25	1	2	0	—		7	1	—		34	2
Borussia Dortmund	2024–25	Bundesliga	32	8	2	0	—		14	4	1 (Note: Appearance in FIFA Club World Cup)	0	49	12
Borussia Dortmund	Total		76	12	7	0	—		23	5	1	0	107	17
Chelsea	2025–26	Premier League	16	0	1	0	3	1	7	0	—		27	1
Chelsea	2026–27	Premier League	0	0	0	0	2	0	—		—		2	0
Chelsea	Total		16	0	1	0	5	1	7	0	0	0	29	1
Career total			92	12	8	0	5	1	30	5	1	0	136	18

== Honours ==
Borussia Dortmund

- UEFA Champions League runner-up: 2023–24

Chelsea

- FA Cup runner-up: 2025–26

England U19

- UEFA European Under-19 Championship: 2022
