= Ben-Luca Moritz =

German footballer

Personal information
- Date of birth: 12 April 2000 (age 26)
- Place of birth: Zwickau, Germany
- Height: 1.88 m (6 ft 2 in)
- Position: Centre-back

Team information
- Current team: FSV Zwickau
- Number: 2

Youth career
- –2011: FSV Zwickau
- 2011–2016: Chemnitzer FC
- 2016–2017: 1860 Munich
- 2017–2019: Rot-Weiß Erfurt

Senior career*
Years	Team	Apps	(Gls)
2018–2019	Rot-Weiß Erfurt	9	(0)
2019–2022	ZFC Meuselwitz	62	(3)
2022–2026	Rot-Weiß Erfurt	108	(7)
2026–	FSV Zwickau	16	(0)
- * Club domestic league appearances and goals as of 20 November 2026

Ben-Luca Moritz (born 12 April 2000) is a German footballer who plays as a centre-back for Regionalliga Nordost club FSV Zwickau.
