= Jadon Sancho =

English footballer (born 2000)

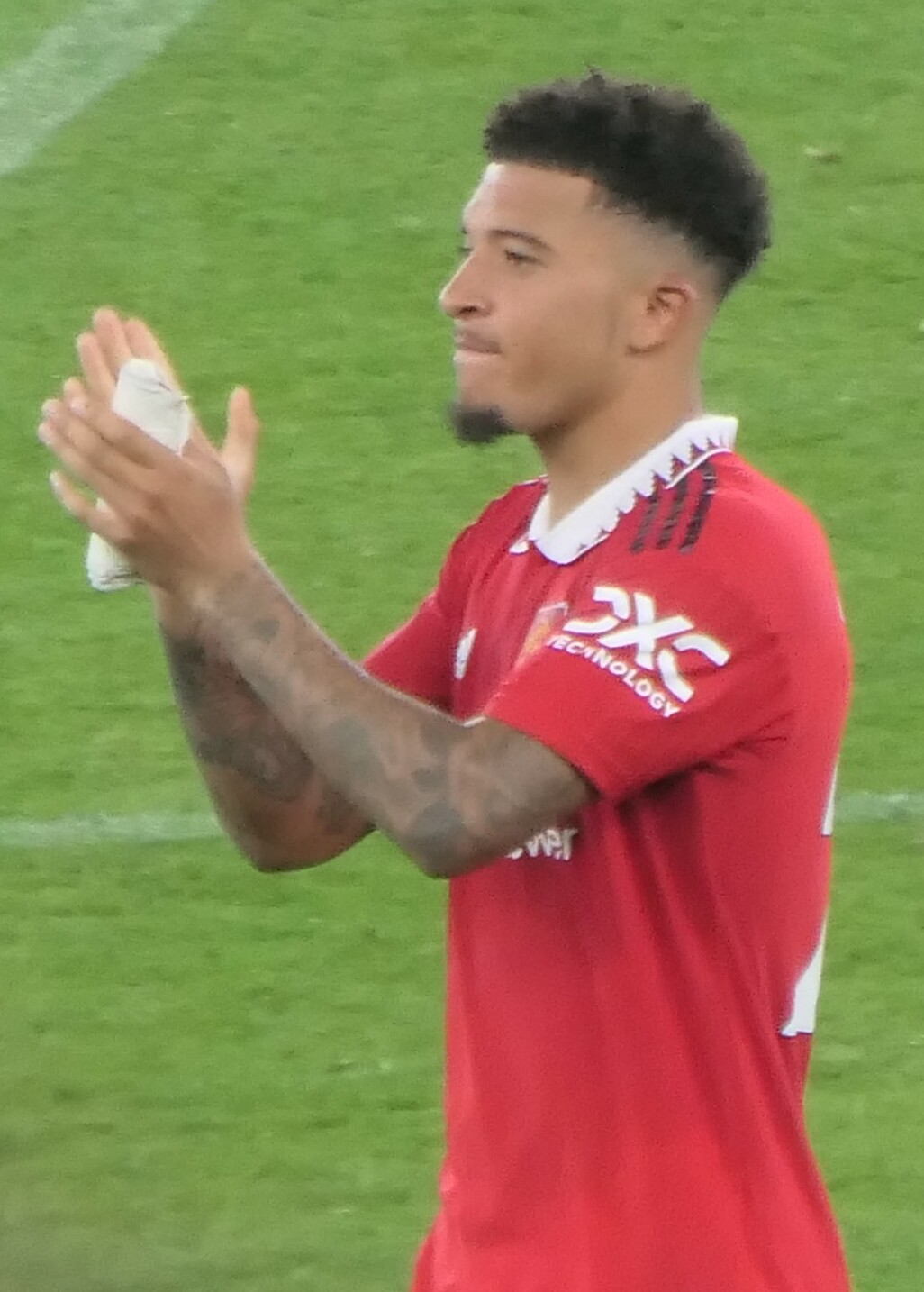
- Sancho in 2022

Personal information
- Full name: Jadon Malik Sancho
- Date of birth: 25 March 2000 (age 26)
- Place of birth: Camberwell, Greater London, England
- Height: 5 ft 11 in (1.80 m)
- Positions: Winger; wide midfielder

Youth career
- 2007–2015: Watford
- 2015–2017: Manchester City

Senior career*
Years	Team	Apps	(Gls)
2017	Borussia Dortmund II	3	(0)
2017–2021	Borussia Dortmund	104	(38)
2021–2026	Manchester United	58	(9)
2024	→ Borussia Dortmund (loan)	14	(2)
2024–2025	→ Chelsea (loan)	31	(3)
2025–2026	→ Aston Villa (loan)	23	(0)

International career
2015–2016	England U16	11	(8)
2016–2017	England U17	19	(16)
2017–2018	England U19	7	(2)
2018–2021	England	23	(3)
Medal record
Men's football
Representing England
UEFA European Championship
Runner-up	2020 Europe
UEFA Nations League
Third place	2019 Portugal
FIFA U-17 World Cup
Winner	2017 India
UEFA European Under-17 Championship
Runner-up	2017 Croatia
- * Club domestic league appearances and goals as of 22:27, 15 May 2026 (UTC)

Jadon Malik Sancho (born 25 March 2000) is an English professional footballer who plays as a winger. He is currently a free agent.

Previously a youth player with Watford and Manchester City, Sancho signed his first senior contract with Borussia Dortmund in 2017. Over four seasons with the club he made 137 appearances and won the 2019 DFL-Supercup and the 2020–21 DFB-Pokal, where he finished as the tournament's top scorer.

Sancho returned to England to sign for Manchester United in 2021, winning an EFL Cup in his second season. He later spent successive loan spells at Dortmund, where he reached the 2024 UEFA Champions League final, and Chelsea, where he won the UEFA Conference League in 2025 and scored in the final. In 2025, he was loaned to Aston Villa, where he won the UEFA Europa League.

Sancho was part of the England youth team that won the 2017 FIFA U-17 World Cup. He made his debut for the senior team in 2018, later appearing at UEFA Euro 2020, where his side reached the final.

== Early life ==
Jadon Malik Sancho was born on 25 March 2000 in Camberwell, Greater London, to a father of Guyanese and Jamaican descent and a mother of Trinidadian descent. He lived in the Guinness Trust Building estate in Kennington. He became friends with fellow aspiring footballer Reiss Nelson, who lived nearby, after they played together in youth tournaments. Growing up, he was a Chelsea fan and looked up to Didier Drogba and Frank Lampard. Sancho's primary inspiration was Ronaldinho, saying in 2018 to Sky Sports that "Ronaldinho was a big influence on me, watching him on YouTube, he used to do things that other people didn't really use to do."

== Club career ==
=== Early career ===
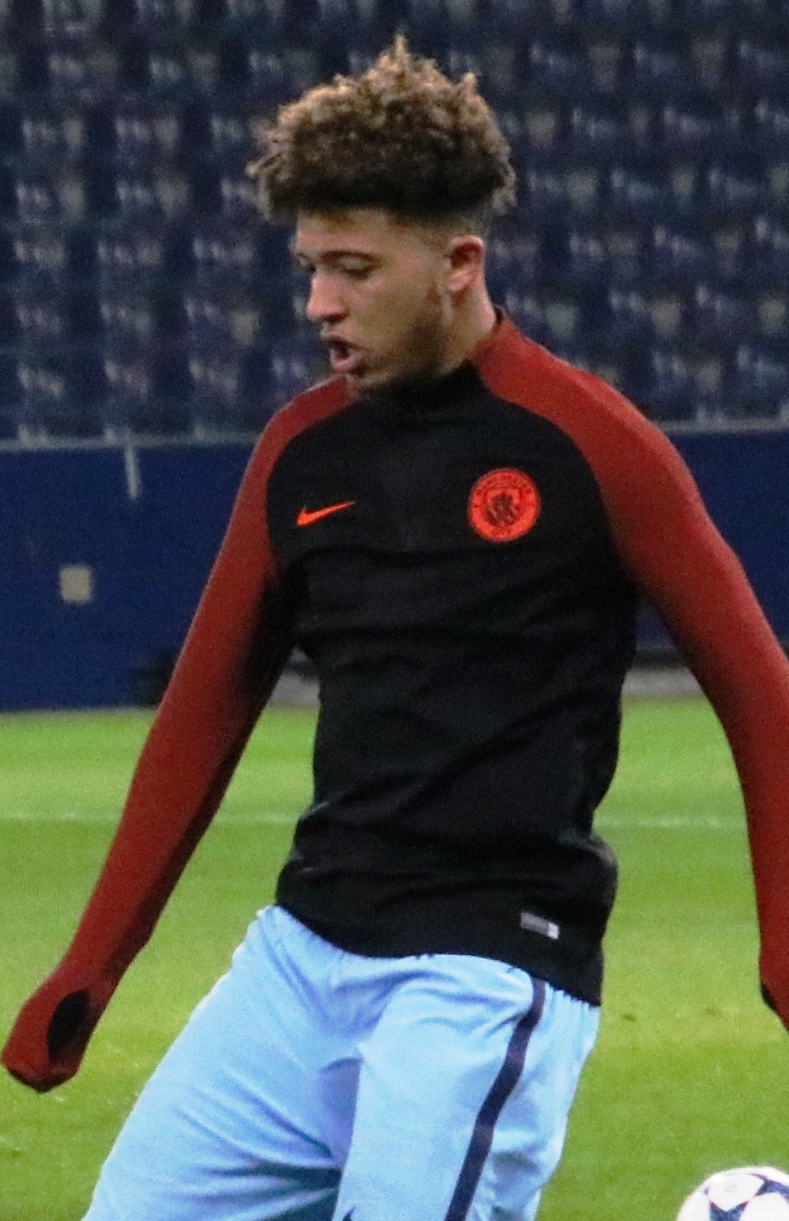
Sancho with Manchester City in 2017

Sancho joined Watford at the age of seven. Due to issues with commuting across London to the club's academy, he moved into accommodation provided by Watford and began attending their partner school Harefield Academy as a boarder, aged 11. At the age of 14 he told his Watford under-15s coach about his intention to play for England.

At the age of 14, he moved to Manchester City in March 2015 for an initial fee of £66,000 under the Elite Player Performance Plan, potentially rising to £500,000 with add ons. Sancho continued to impress in the City academy and was one of a trio of players that City chairman, Khaldoon Al Mubarak, said would be fast tracked into the senior set up in May 2017. In July, Sancho was omitted from City's pre-season tour squad due to a dispute over assurances of playing time in a new contract. It was subsequently reported that Sancho was attempting to engineer a move away from the club and City were alarmed at Sancho's attitude after he missed training following a pre-season tour.

=== Borussia Dortmund ===
==== 2017–2019 ====
Sancho signed for German Bundesliga club Borussia Dortmund on 31 August 2017 for a fee reported to be in the region of £8 million and was immediately included in the first-team squad. He later stated that he felt confident in making the move abroad due to his previous experiences in relocating with Watford and Manchester City. Sancho made his debut for the club against Eintracht Frankfurt on 21 October, coming on as a substitute with six minutes left of the match, becoming the first Englishman to play a Bundesliga match for Dortmund. Sancho made his first league start for Dortmund on 14 January 2018, hitting the woodwork in a goalless draw with VfL Wolfsburg. He scored his first professional goal on 21 April. It was the first goal in a 4–0 victory against Bayer Leverkusen in the Bundesliga and he also assisted two other goals in the same match.

Having signed a new contract keeping him at the club until 2022, Sancho enjoyed a successful October 2018 by being named Bundesliga Player of the Month, registering three goals and an assist in just three league games. Included among his goals for the month was a brace in a draw against Hertha BSC which saw him become the first player born in the 2000s to score twice in a single Bundesliga match and the youngest ever by a Dortmund player. On 24 October, he also became the first player born in the 2000s to score in the UEFA Champions League for Dortmund against Atlético Madrid.

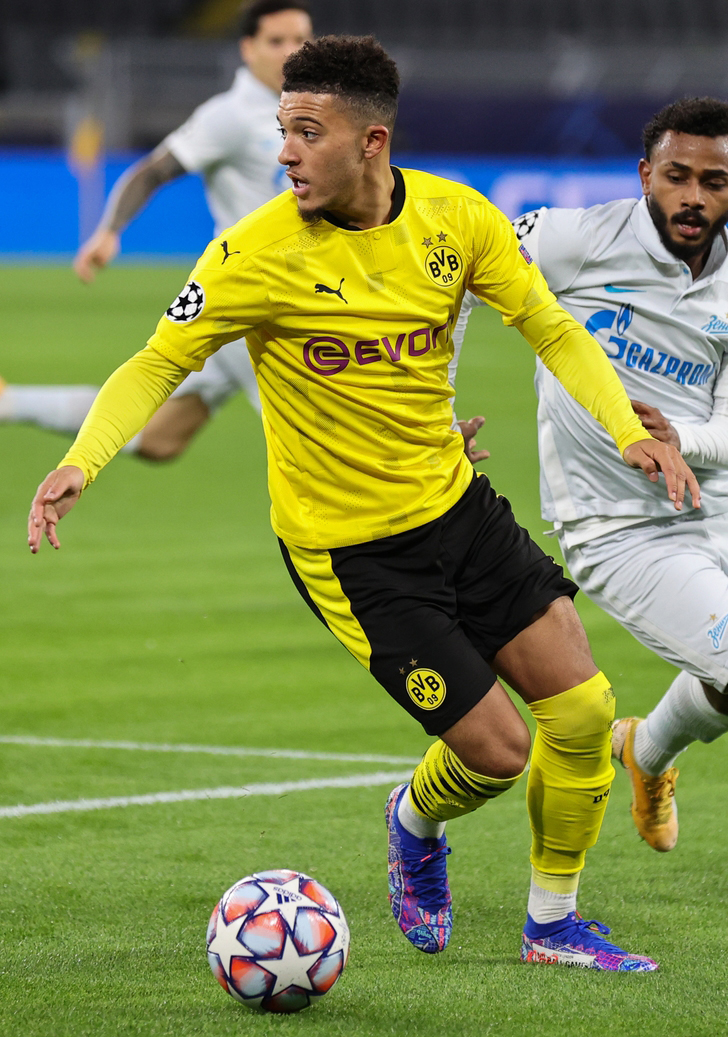
Sancho playing for Borussia Dortmund in 2020

During a 3–3 draw with TSG Hoffenheim on 9 February 2019, he became the youngest-ever player to score eight goals in a single Bundesliga season, breaking the record previously held by Christian Wück. Later that month, upon scoring in a 3–2 win over Bayer Leverkusen, he broke Lukas Podolski's record to become the youngest player to score nine Bundesliga goals, aged 18 years and 336 days. On 13 April, Sancho scored a brace in a 2–1 win over Mainz 05 and in doing so became the youngest-ever Dortmund player to score at least 10 goals in a single Bundesliga campaign. Following an impressive league campaign in which he scored 12 goals and provided 14 assists, Sancho was named in the 2018–19 Bundesliga Team of the Season.

==== 2019–2021 ====
Success continued ahead of the 2019–20 season, with Sancho providing an assist and scoring in a 2–0 DFL-Supercup victory over Bayern Munich on 3 August 2019. Later that month Sancho agreed a new contract with Dortmund. In November, he was named runner-up in the Golden Boy award. The next month, he was named runner-up in the Kopa Trophy award. Sancho's goal in Dortmund's 3–3 draw with RB Leipzig on 17 December meant he had scored in seven consecutive games for the club (including in Champions League matches against Barcelona and Slavia Prague), bringing his tally up to 15 goals and 16 assists in the Bundesliga in the calendar year of 2019. Sancho's three goals and three assists in five league matches during February 2020 saw him named Bundesliga Player of the Month for the second time in his career.

On 31 May 2020, Sancho scored his first career hat-trick in a 6–1 away win over SC Paderborn. After scoring his first goal, he removed his shirt to reveal a shirt with the message "Justice for George Floyd", a black man who was murdered earlier that week in Minneapolis by a police officer, who knelt on Floyd's neck until he became unresponsive. He finished the 2019–20 season with career-best numbers, scoring 17 goals and providing 16 assists in the Bundesliga.

On 13 May 2021, Sancho scored two goals in a 4–1 win over RB Leipzig in the 2021 DFB-Pokal final.

=== Manchester United ===
==== 2021–2023 ====
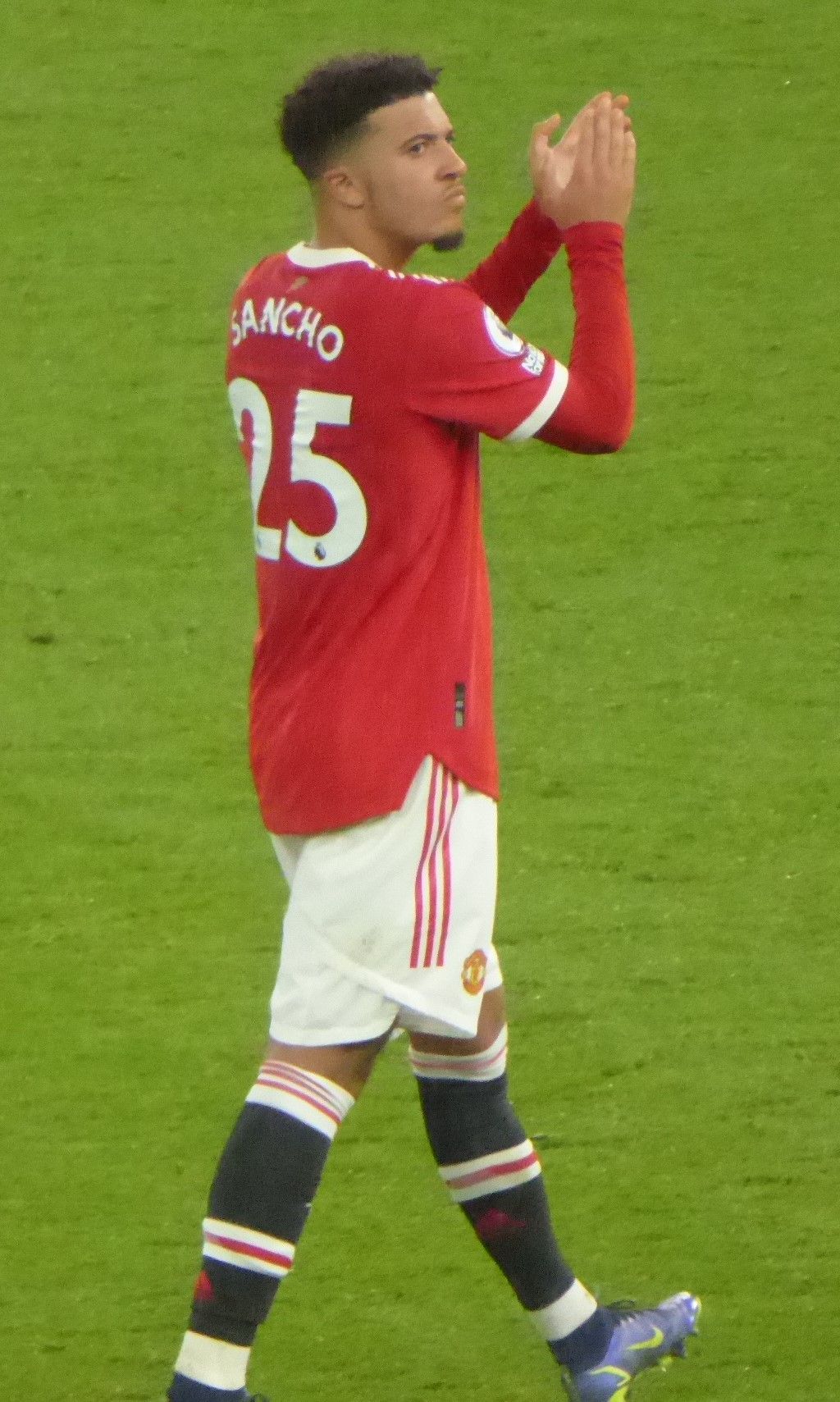
Sancho playing for Manchester United in 2021

On 1 July 2021, it was announced that Manchester United and Dortmund had reached an agreement for Sancho's transfer, subject to him signing a contract and passing a medical, both of which were expected to happen after UEFA Euro 2020. The transfer was completed on 23 July, for a reported transfer fee of £73 million (€85 million), after Sancho signed a five-year contract with the option of a further year. On 14 August, he made his debut as a substitute for Daniel James in a 5–1 home league win over rivals Leeds United. On 23 November, he scored his first goal for the club, against Villarreal to secure a spot in the knockout stage of the Champions League. Five days later, he scored his first Premier League goal against Chelsea after Jorginho miscontrolled a long clearance from Bruno Fernandes, allowing Sancho to take advantage of a two-on-one with Édouard Mendy.

Sancho scored his first goal of the 2022–23 season in a 2–1 home victory over Liverpool on 22 August 2022. On 1 February 2023, he played in the EFL Cup semi-final second leg match against Nottingham Forest, his first match since October 2022, as his team secured a place in the final. A week later, he came off the bench to score the equalising goal in a 2–2 draw at home to Leeds United.

==== 2023–24: Removal from squad, loan return to Dortmund ====
Sancho was not included in United's squad for their game against Arsenal on 3 September 2023, with manager Erik ten Hag explaining that Sancho was not picked due to "his performances in training", stating that players "have to reach a level every day at Manchester United". In response, Sancho wrote on social media that "I will not allow people saying things that is completely untrue, I have conducted myself very well in training this week... I've been a scapegoat for a long time which isn't fair!" United then announced on 14 September that Sancho would train "away from the first team group pending resolution of a squad discipline issue."

On 11 January 2024, Sancho returned to former club Borussia Dortmund on loan for the rest of the 2023–24 season following his desire to leave United after his exclusion from the squad by Ten Hag for disciplinary reasons. Dortmund paid United a reported loan fee of €4 million. On 13 January, Sancho featured in his first match since rejoining Dortmund, coming on as a substitute in the 55th minute of the game against Darmstadt 98, which ended in a 3–0 win, with Sancho providing the assist for a goal from Marco Reus. On 9 March, Sancho scored against Werder Bremen, drawing level with Tony Woodcock as the highest-scoring Englishman in the Bundesliga. Four days later, he scored against PSV, as Dortmund secured their spot in the quarter-finals of the Champions League. On 28 April, Sancho overtook Woodcock to become the highest-scoring Englishman in the Bundesliga, opening the scoring in a 4–1 defeat against RB Leipzig. This record lasted just under five months, as he would be surpassed by Harry Kane. On 1 May, he completed 12 dribbles against Paris Saint-Germain in the Champions League semi-final first leg, the most from a player at that round since Lionel Messi in 2008. On 1 June, he started in the Champions League final for Dortmund at Wembley Stadium, playing 87 minutes as they lost 2–0 to Real Madrid.

==== 2024–25: Brief return and loan to Chelsea ====
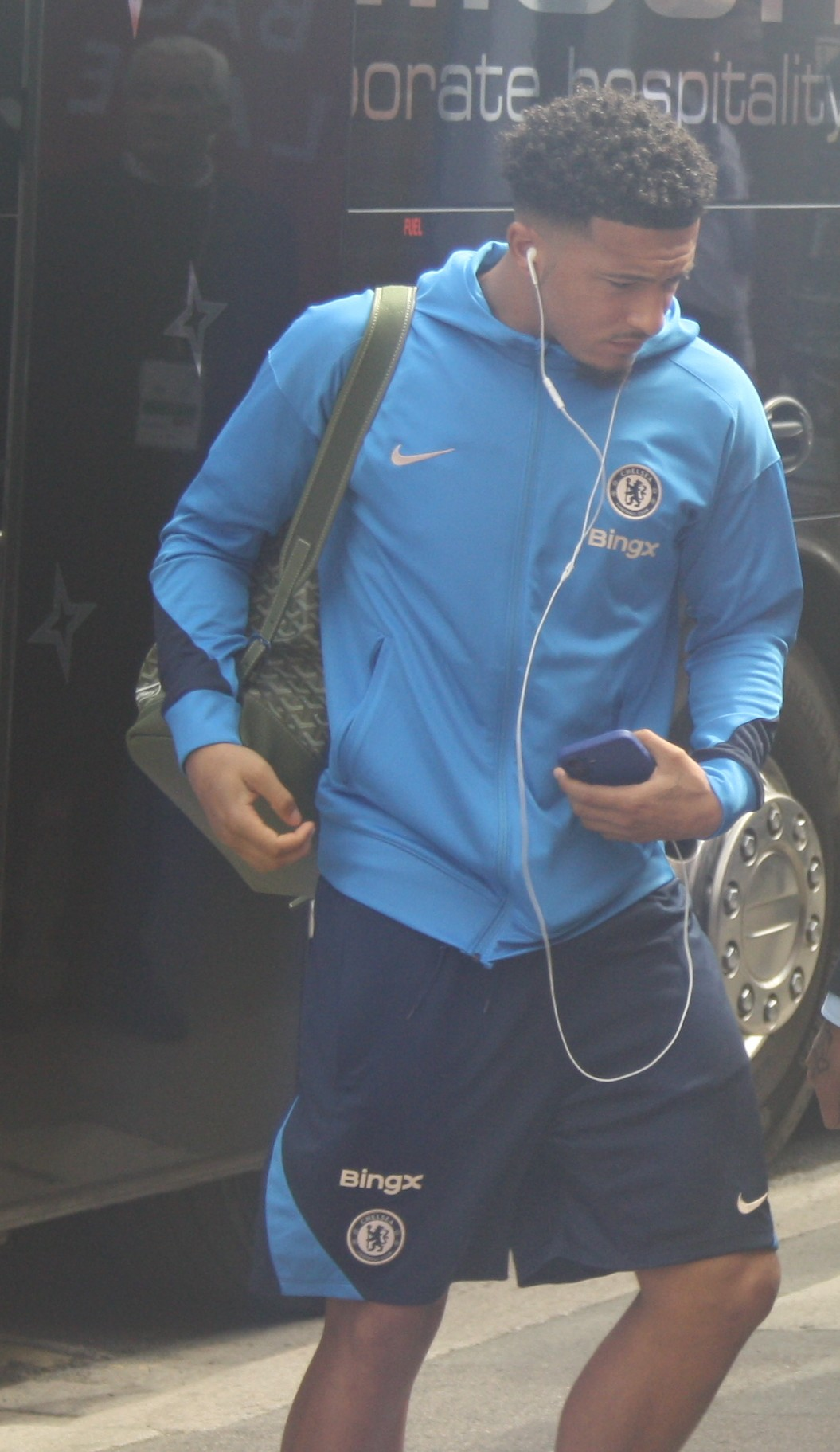
Sancho with Chelsea in 2025

Following his loan to Dortmund, Sancho returned to training with United following a meeting with Ten Hag, in which they reportedly drew a line under their disagreement. On 10 August 2024, he came on as a substitute in the 2024 FA Community Shield against Manchester City, later missing a penalty in the ensuing shoot-out as City triumphed. On 31 August, Sancho signed for fellow Premier League club Chelsea on loan for the 2024–25 season, with an obligation to buy. The obligation to buy, worth £20 million plus £5 million in performance-related add-ons, would reportedly be triggered if Chelsea finish within the top 14. He made his debut as a half-time substitute for Pedro Neto in a league match against Bournemouth on 14 September. After assisting Christopher Nkunku's winning goal in the 86th minute, Sancho was named Man of the Match. Sancho started in Chelsea's next two Premier League matches and registered assists in both games, away at West Ham United on 21 September and at home against Brighton & Hove Albion on 28 September, both matches ending in victories for Chelsea. He scored his first goal for Chelsea with the fifth goal in their 5–1 league win over Southampton on 4 December. He then scored a long-range strike against Tottenham Hotspur on 8 December, with this goal being the first of four to spark a comeback victory for Chelsea.

On 1 May 2025, Sancho scored the opening goal in the first leg of the Conference League semi-final, helping Chelsea to a 4–1 away win over Djurgården. Later that month, on 28 May, he netted the third goal for Chelsea in a 4–1 win over Real Betis in the 2025 UEFA Conference League final. On 3 June, Chelsea chose not to exercise the option to sign Sancho, paying a £5 million penalty to Manchester United to avoid signing him permanently.

==== 2025–26: Loan to Aston Villa and departure ====
On 1 September, Sancho signed for fellow Premier League club Aston Villa on a season-long loan.

Sancho was first included in the matchday squad during the 0–0 draw against Everton on 13 September 2025, and he made his first appearance for Aston Villa during the loss on penalties against Brentford in the EFL Cup third round on 16 September 2025. Sancho scored his first goal for Aston Villa on 22 January 2026 during the 1–0 victory against Fenerbahçe in the UEFA Europa League.

Sancho came on as a substitute for Aston Villa in their 2026 UEFA Europa League final 3–0 win over Freiburg in Istanbul, marking his third European final in consecutive seasons, for three different clubs, in three different European cup competitions, becoming the first player ever to achieve such a feat.

On 10 June 2026, United confirmed Sancho would be leaving the club when his contract expires at the end of the month.

== Personal life ==
Sancho is a well known video gamer. Since 2025, Sancho has been in a relationship with American rapper Saweetie.

== International career ==
=== Youth career ===
Sancho was capped by England's youth teams at under-16, under-17 and under-19 levels.

In May 2017, Sancho was part of the England under-17 team that reached the final of the UEFA European Under-17 Championship, and was named player of the tournament for his performances. In September 2017, Sancho was named in England's squad for the 2017 FIFA U-17 World Cup but the player's new German club resisted the call up. The two parties eventually reached an agreement where he would be available for the group stages of the competition, but his participation was not guaranteed if England progressed to the knock out rounds. On 8 October 2017, he scored twice in England U17's first match, against Chile. On 16 October, during England's round of 16 tie against Japan, he was withdrawn from the competition by Borussia Dortmund.

On 2 November 2017, Sancho was called up to the England U19 squad for the first time, joining them for 2018 UEFA European Under-19 Championship qualification matches against the Faroe Islands, Iceland and Group 8's host-nation team Bulgaria. He made his first start at U19 level in the 6–0 victory against the Faroes, lasting seventy minutes before being substituted for Ben Brereton; He replaced Brereton in the 66th minute in the win over Iceland, which secured progression to the elite round. He scored the only goal of the match against Bulgaria to help England top their group. Coming on as a substitute for Brereton, Sancho scored the last of the goals in England's 4–1 win over Hungary in the first match of the elite round on 21 March 2018.

=== Senior career ===
Following an impressive start to the 2018–19 season, Sancho was called up to the England senior squad for the first time on 4 October 2018 in preparation for UEFA Nations League fixtures against Croatia and Spain. He made his debut as a 78th-minute substitute against Croatia on 12 October, in a 0–0 away draw. On 22 March 2019, Sancho started his first competitive match for England in their 5–0 win over the Czech Republic at Wembley Stadium for a UEFA Euro 2020 qualifying match. During the September internationals, Sancho scored his debut goals for the senior team, a brace, in a 5–3 home victory over Kosovo in a Euro 2020 qualifier on 10 September.

On 11 July 2021, Sancho was brought on as a 120th-minute substitute for Kyle Walker during the UEFA Euro 2020 final against Italy. He took England's fourth penalty in the subsequent shoot-out, which was saved by Gianluigi Donnarumma. Following the 3–2 loss on penalties, Sancho along with Marcus Rashford and Bukayo Saka (who also missed penalties) were subjected to racially abusive messages on social media.

Sancho was not included in England's squad for the 2022 FIFA World Cup, UEFA Euro 2024, or the 2026 FIFA World Cup.

== Style of play ==
Analyses from 2020 described Sancho as a quick, highly technical, and creative player, with excellent dribbling skills and ball control, and he received praise for his trickery and use of feints in one-on-one situations. While at Dortmund, Sancho was described as one of the best young players in the world, being known in particular for his ability to get past opponents and create chances for teammates as well as scoring goals himself. In 2021, Dietmar Hamann called Sancho the best winger in the world.

Sancho featured as a second striker or wide midfielder typically in a Borussia Dortmund 4–2–3–1 formation on either wing of attack. Dortmund's "young player project" helped Sancho function in the focal point of attack alongside a core of talented young stars like Erling Haaland, Gio Reyna and Jude Bellingham.

== Career statistics ==
=== Club ===
As of match played 20 May 2026

Appearances and goals by club, season and competition
Club	Season	League			National cup (Note: Includes DFB-Pokal, FA Cup)		League cup (Note: Includes EFL Cup)		Europe		Other		Total	
Club	Season	Division	Apps	Goals	Apps	Goals	Apps	Goals	Apps	Goals	Apps	Goals	Apps	Goals
Borussia Dortmund II	2017–18	Regionalliga West	3	0	—		—		—		—		3	0
Borussia Dortmund	2017–18	Bundesliga	12	1	0	0	—		0	0	0	0	12	1
Borussia Dortmund	2018–19	Bundesliga	34	12	2	0	—		7 (Note: Appearances in UEFA Champions League)	1	—		43	13
Borussia Dortmund	2019–20	Bundesliga	32	17	3	0	—		8	2	1 (Note: Appearance in DFL-Supercup)	1	44	20
Borussia Dortmund	2020–21	Bundesliga	26	8	6	6	—		6	2	0	0	38	16
Borussia Dortmund	Total		104	38	11	6	—		21	5	1	1	137	50
Manchester United	2021–22	Premier League	29	3	1	1	1	0	7	1	—		38	5
Manchester United	2022–23	Premier League	26	6	3	0	2	0	10 (Note: Appearances in UEFA Europa League)	1	—		41	7
Manchester United	2023–24	Premier League	3	0	0	0	0	0	0	0	—		3	0
Manchester United	2024–25	Premier League	0	0	—		—		—		1 (Note: Appearance in FA Community Shield)	0	1	0
Manchester United	2025–26	Premier League	0	0	—		0	0	—		—		0	0
Manchester United	Total		58	9	4	1	3	0	17	2	1	0	83	12
Borussia Dortmund (loan)	2023–24	Bundesliga	14	2	—		—		7	1	—		21	3
Chelsea (loan)	2024–25	Premier League	31	3	2	0	0	0	8 (Note: Appearances in UEFA Conference League)	2	0	0	41	5
Aston Villa (loan)	2025–26	Premier League	23	0	2	0	1	0	13	1	—		39	1
Career total			233	52	19	7	4	0	66	11	2	1	324	71

=== International ===
Appearances and goals by national team and year
National team	Year	Apps	Goals
England	2018	3	0
England	2019	8	2
England	2020	7	1
England	2021	5	0
Total		23	3

England score listed first, score column indicates score after each Sancho goal

List of international goals scored by Jadon Sancho
No.	Date	Venue	Cap	Opponent	Score	Result	Competition	Ref.
1	10 September 2019	St Mary's Stadium, Southampton, England	8	Kosovo	4–1	5–3	UEFA Euro 2020 qualifying	
2	10 September 2019	St Mary's Stadium, Southampton, England	8	Kosovo	5–1	5–3	UEFA Euro 2020 qualifying	
3	12 November 2020	Wembley Stadium, London, England	16	Republic of Ireland	2–0	3–0	Friendly	

== Honours ==
Borussia Dortmund

- DFB-Pokal: 2020–21
- DFL-Supercup: 2019
- UEFA Champions League runner-up: 2023–24

Manchester United

- EFL Cup: 2022–23
- FA Cup runner-up: 2022–23

Chelsea

- UEFA Conference League: 2024–25

Aston Villa

- UEFA Europa League: 2025–26

England

- UEFA European Championship runner-up: 2020

England U17

- FIFA U-17 World Cup: 2017

Individual

- UEFA European Under-17 Championship Golden Player: 2017
- UEFA European Under-17 Championship Team of the Tournament: 2017
- Bundesliga Player of the Month: October 2018, February 2020, February 2021
- Bundesliga Goal of the Month: February 2019
- Bundesliga Team of the Season: 2018–19, 2019–20
- kicker Bundesliga Team of the Season: 2018–19, 2019–20
- VDV Newcomer of the Season (Silver Arrow): 2018–19
- VDV Team of the Season: 2018–19, 2019–20
- Goal.com NxGn: 2019
- DFB-Pokal top scorer: 2020–21
