= Tigges =

Tigges is a surname. Notable people with the surname include:

- Jakob Tigges (fl. from 2009), German architect and academic
- Leon Tigges (born 1998), German footballer
- Raphael Tigges (born 1973), German politician
- Steffen Tigges (born 1998), German footballer, brother of Leon
