= 2021–22 Borussia Dortmund season =

113th season in existence of Borussia Dortmund

Borussia Dortmund
2021–22 season
- Owner: Reinhard Rauball
- Chairman: Hans-Joachim Watzke (CEO)
- Head coach: Marco Rose
- Stadium: Westfalenstadion
- Bundesliga: 2nd
- DFB-Pokal: Round of 16
- DFL-Supercup: Runners-up
- UEFA Champions League: Group stage
- UEFA Europa League: Knockout round play-offs
- Top goalscorer: League: Erling Haaland (22); All: Erling Haaland (29)
Home colours	Away colours	Third/Cup away colours

The 2021–22 season was the 113th season in the existence of Borussia Dortmund and the club's 46th consecutive season in the top flight of German football. In addition to the domestic league, Borussia Dortmund participated in this season's editions of the DFB-Pokal, the UEFA Champions League and the UEFA Europa League, as well as the DFL-Supercup as winners of the 2020–21 DFB-Pokal.

The season was the first since 2009–10 without Łukasz Piszczek, who departed to LKS Goczałkowice-Zdrój.

== Players ==
=== First-team squad ===
As of 31 January 2022

Note: Flags indicate national team as defined under FIFA eligibility rules; some limited exceptions apply. Players may hold more than one non-FIFA nationality.

No.	Pos.	Nation	Player
1	GK	SUI	Gregor Kobel
2	DF	ESP	Mateu Morey
4	DF	FRA	Soumaila Coulibaly
7	MF	USA	Giovanni Reyna
8	MF	GER	Mahmoud Dahoud
9	FW	NOR	Erling Haaland
10	MF	BEL	Thorgan Hazard
11	FW	GER	Marco Reus (captain)
13	DF	POR	Raphaël Guerreiro
14	DF	GER	Nico Schulz
15	DF	GER	Mats Hummels
16	DF	SUI	Manuel Akanji
18	FW	GER	Youssoufa Moukoko
19	MF	GER	Julian Brandt
20	MF	BRA	Reinier (on loan from Real Madrid)

No.	Pos.	Nation	Player
21	FW	NED	Donyell Malen
22	MF	ENG	Jude Bellingham
23	MF	GER	Emre Can
24	MF	BEL	Thomas Meunier
25	GK	GER	Luca Unbehaun
27	FW	GER	Steffen Tigges
28	MF	BEL	Axel Witsel
29	DF	GER	Marcel Schmelzer
30	MF	GER	Felix Passlack
32	MF	GUI	Abdoulaye Kamara
34	DF	CRO	Marin Pongračić (on loan from VfL Wolfsburg)
35	GK	SUI	Marwin Hitz
38	GK	SUI	Roman Bürki
39	MF	GER	Marius Wolf
40	GK	GER	Stefan Drljača

=== Out on loan ===
Note: Flags indicate national team as defined under FIFA eligibility rules; some limited exceptions apply. Players may hold more than one non-FIFA nationality.

No.	Pos.	Nation	Player
—	FW	GER	Ansgar Knauff (at Eintracht Frankfurt until 30 June 2023)

== Transfers ==
=== In ===
No.	Pos	Player	Transferred from	Fee	Date	Source
4	DF	(France) Soumaïla Coulibaly	(France) Paris Saint-Germain U19	Free	1 July 2021	
1	GK	(Switzerland) Gregor Kobel	(Germany) VfB Stuttgart	€15,000,000	1 July 2021	
32	MF	(Guinea) Abdoulaye Kamara	(France) Paris Saint-Germain	Free	21 July 2021	
21	FW	(Netherlands) Donyell Malen	(Netherlands) PSV Eindhoven	€30,000,000	27 July 2021	
34	DF	(Croatia) Marin Pongračić	(Germany) VfL Wolfsburg	Loan	31 August 2021	

=== Out ===
No.	Pos	Player	Transferred to	Fee	Date	Source
15	DF	(Germany) Jeremy Toljan	(Italy) Sassuolo	€3,500,000	1 July 2021	
26	DF	(Poland) Łukasz Piszczek	(Poland) LKS Goczałkowice-Zdrój	Free	1 July 2021	
–	MF	(Spain) Sergio Gomez	(Belgium) Anderlecht	€1,500,000	1 July 2021	
–	DF	(Argentina) Leonardo Balerdi	(France) Marseille	€8,000,000	3 July 2021	
7	FW	(England) Jadon Sancho	(England) Manchester United	€85,000,000	23 July 2021	
6	MF	(Denmark) Thomas Delaney	(Spain) Sevilla	€6,000,000	25 August 2021	
36	FW	(Germany) Ansgar Knauff	(Germany) Eintracht Frankfurt	Loan	20 January 2022	
37	MF	(Germany) Tobias Raschl	(Germany) Greuther Fürth	Undisclosed	31 January 2022	

== Kits ==
Home	Home alt.	Away	Away alt.	UCL Home	UCL Home alt.

== Pre-season and friendlies ==
Win Draw Loss Fixtures

13 July 2021 Friendly	FC Gießen	0–2	Borussia Dortmund	Heeslingen, Germany
18:30 CEST (UTC+2)		Report	Knauff 34'; Tigges 42'	Stadium: Waldstadion; Attendance: 3,700

17 July 2021 Cup der Traditionen	MSV Duisburg	Cancelled	Borussia Dortmund	Duisburg, Germany
15:00 CEST (UTC+2)				Stadium: MSV-Arena
Note: The 45-minute match was cancelled after three Duisburg players tested positive for COVID-19.

17 July 2021 Cup der Traditionen	Borussia Dortmund	1–3	VfL Bochum	Duisburg, Germany
15:00 CEST (UTC+2)	Pasalic 83'	Report	Novothny 66'; Ganvoula 68'; Bockhorn 78'	Stadium: MSV-Arena; Attendance: 10,395
Note: The match was extended from the initially planned 45 minutes to 90 minutes following MSV Duisburg's withdrawal from the tournament.

24 July 2021 Friendly	Borussia Dortmund	0–2	Athletic Bilbao	St. Gallen, Switzerland
16:00 CEST (UTC+2)		Report	R. García 50' (pen.); Vivian 57'; Petxarroman (yellow card) 60'; Vesga (yellow card) 75'	Stadium: Kybunpark; Attendance: 3,527; Referee: Sven Wolfensberger

30 July 2021 Friendly	Borussia Dortmund	3–0	Bologna	Altach, Austria
18:30 CEST (UTC+2)	Reyna 24'; Maloney 42', (yellow card) 64'; Tigges 45+1'	Report		Stadium: Stadion Schnabelholz; Attendance: 5,978; Referee: Dominik Ouschan

7 October 2021 Friendly	Borussia Dortmund	0–3	SC Paderborn	Dortmund, Germany
16:00 CEST (UTC+2)		Report	Platte 78', 89'; Owusu 87'	Stadium: Borussia Dortmund Trainingsgelände; Attendance: 400

26 April 2022 Global Tour for Peace	Borussia Dortmund	2–3	Dynamo Kyiv	Dortmund, Germany
18:00 CEST (UTC+2)	Bynoe-Gittens 4'; Reinier (penalty missed) 54'; Rothe 65'	Report	Buyalskyi 9'; Vanat 11', 35'; Shaparenko (penalty missed) 17'	Stadium: Signal Iduna Park; Attendance: 35,000; Referee: Denys Shurman

== Competitions ==
=== Overall record ===
Competition	First match	Last match	Starting round	Final position	Record							
Competition	First match	Last match	Starting round	Final position	Pld	W	D	L	GF	GA	GD	Win %
Bundesliga	14 August 2021	14 May 2022	Matchday 1	2nd	34	22	3	9	85	52	+33	64.71
DFB-Pokal	7 August 2021	18 January 2022	First round	Round of 16	3	2	0	1	6	2	+4	66.67
DFL-Supercup	17 August 2021		Final	Runners-up	1	0	0	1	1	3	−2	0.00
UEFA Champions League	15 September 2021	7 December 2021	Group stage	Group stage	6	3	0	3	10	11	−1	50.00
UEFA Europa League	17 February 2022	24 February 2022	Knockout round play-offs	Knockout round play-offs	2	0	1	1	4	6	−2	0.00
Total					46	27	4	15	106	74	+32	58.70

Source: Soccerway

=== Bundesliga ===
==== League table ====
Pos	Team	Pld	W	D	L	GF	GA	GD	Pts	Qualification or relegation
1	Bayern Munich (C)	34	24	5	5	97	37	+60	77	Qualification for the Champions League group stage
2	Borussia Dortmund	34	22	3	9	85	52	+33	69	Qualification for the Champions League group stage
3	Bayer Leverkusen	34	19	7	8	80	47	+33	64	Qualification for the Champions League group stage
4	RB Leipzig	34	17	7	10	72	37	+35	58	Qualification for the Champions League group stage
5	Union Berlin	34	16	9	9	50	44	+6	57	Qualification for the Europa League group stage (Note: Since the 2021–22 DFB-Pokal winners, RB Leipzig, qualified for the Champions League based on league position, the Europa League group stage spot was passed to the sixth-placed team, and the Europa Conference League play-off round spot was passed to the seventh-placed team.)

Source: DFB
Rules for classification: 1) Points; 2) Goal difference; 3) Goals scored; 4) Head-to-head results; 5) Head-to-head away goals scored; 6) Away goals scored; 7) Play-off.
(C) Champions

==== Results summary ====
Overall								Home						Away					
Pld	W	D	L	GF	GA	GD	Pts	W	D	L	GF	GA	GD	W	D	L	GF	GA	GD
34	22	3	9	85	52	+33	69	13	0	4	52	28	+24	9	3	5	33	24	+9

Source: DFB

==== Results by round ====
Round	1	2	3	4	5	6	7	8	9	10	11	12	13	14	15	16	17	18	19	20	21	22	23	24	25	26	27	28	29	30	31	32	33	34
Ground	H	A	H	A	H	A	H	H	A	H	A	H	A	H	A	H	A	A	H	A	H	A	H	A	A	H	A	H	A	H	A	H	A	H
Result	W	L	W	W	W	L	W	W	W	W	L	W	W	L	D	W	L	W	W	W	L	W	W	D	W	W	D	L	W	W	L	L	W	W
Position	3	7	5	3	3	4	3	2	2	2	2	2	2	2	2	2	2	2	2	2	2	2	2	2	2	2	2	2	2	2	2	2	2	2

Source: DFB
A = Away; H = Home; W = Win; D = Draw; L = Loss

==== Matches ====
The league fixtures were announced on 25 June 2021.

14 August 2021 1	Borussia Dortmund	5–2	Eintracht Frankfurt	Dortmund
18:30 CEST (UTC+2)	Reus 23'; Hazard 32'; Haaland 34', 72'; Reyna 58'	Report	Passlack 27' (o.g.); Hauge 86'	Stadium: Signal Iduna Park; Attendance: 25,000; Referee: Tobias Stieler

21 August 2021 2	SC Freiburg	2–1	Borussia Dortmund	Freiburg
15:30 CEST (UTC+2)	Grifo 6'; Sallai 53'; Demirović (yellow card) 86'	Report	Malen (yellow card) 19'; Dahoud (yellow card) 34'; Keitel 59' (o.g.); Akanji (yellow card) 61'; Guerreiro (yellow card) 76'	Stadium: SC-Stadion; Attendance: 10,100; Referee: Robert Schröder

27 August 2021 3	Borussia Dortmund	3–2	1899 Hoffenheim	Dortmund
20:30 CEST (UTC+2)	Dahoud (yellow card) 36'; Reyna 49'; Meunier (yellow card) 54'; Bellingham 69'; Haaland 90+1'	Report	Baumgartner (yellow card) 1', (goal) 61'; Posch (yellow card) 7'; Geiger (yellow card) 20'; Dabbur 90'	Stadium: Signal Iduna Park; Attendance: 25,000; Referee: Felix Zwayer

11 September 2021 4	Bayer Leverkusen	3–4	Borussia Dortmund	Leverkusen
15:30 CEST (UTC+2)	Wirtz 9', (yellow card) 60'; Schick 45+1'; Diaby 55', (yellow card) 86'; Frimpong (yellow card) 70'; Kossounou (yellow card) 75'	Report	Meunier (yellow card) 20'; Haaland 37', 77' (pen.), (yellow card) 60'; Brandt 49'; Guerreiro 71'; Wolf (yellow card) 90+2'	Stadium: BayArena; Attendance: 17,605; Referee: Daniel Siebert

19 September 2021 5	Borussia Dortmund	4–2	Union Berlin	Dortmund
17:30 CEST (UTC+2)	Guerreiro 10'; Haaland 24', 83'; Hummels (yellow card) 50'; Friedrich 52' (o.g.); Witsel (yellow card) 57'	Report	Friedrich (yellow card) 15'; Gießelmann (yellow card) 50'; Kruse 57' (pen.); Voglsammer 81'; Ryerson (yellow card) 90+1'	Stadium: Signal Iduna Park; Attendance: 25,000; Referee: Sven Jablonski

25 September 2021 6	Borussia Mönchengladbach	1–0	Borussia Dortmund	Mönchengladbach
18:30 CEST (UTC+2)	Zakaria (yellow card) 13', (goal) 37'; Stindl (yellow card) 33'; Netz (yellow card) 45+2'; Koné (yellow card) 59'	Report	Dahoud (yellow card) 10' (yellow-red card) 40'; Pongračić (yellow card) 35'; Bellingham (yellow card) 85'	Stadium: Borussia-Park; Attendance: 25,000; Referee: Deniz Aytekin

2 October 2021 7	Borussia Dortmund	2–1	FC Augsburg	Dortmund
15:30 CEST (UTC+2)	Guerreiro 10' (pen.); Reus (yellow card) 44'; Brandt 51'	Report	Gruezo (yellow card) 13'; Oxford (yellow card) 15'; Zeqiri 35', (yellow card) 53'	Stadium: Signal Iduna Park; Attendance: 41,000; Referee: Tobias Welz

16 October 2021 8	Borussia Dortmund	3–1	Mainz 05	Dortmund
15:30 CEST (UTC+2)	Reus 3'; Schulz (yellow card) 13'; Akanji (yellow card) 35'; Haaland 54' (pen.), 90+4'	Report	Bell (yellow card) 50'; Ingvartsen (yellow card) 64'; Tauer (yellow card) 71'; Burkardt 87'; Niakhaté (yellow card) 89'	Stadium: Signal Iduna Park; Attendance: 63,812; Referee: Daniel Schlager

23 October 2021 9	Arminia Bielefeld	1–3	Borussia Dortmund	Bielefeld
15:30 CEST (UTC+2)	Kunze (yellow card) 83'; Klos 87' (pen.)	Report	Can 31' (pen.); Hummels 45'; Bellingham 72'	Stadium: Bielefelder Alm; Attendance: 25,000; Referee: Benjamin Brand

30 October 2021 10	Borussia Dortmund	2–0	1. FC Köln	Dortmund
15:30 CEST (UTC+2)	Hazard 40'; Meunier (yellow card) 52'; Tigges 64'; Bellingham (yellow card) 88'	Report	Schmitz (yellow card) 11'; Hübers (yellow card) 56'; Özcan (yellow card) 82'	Stadium: Signal Iduna Park; Attendance: 66,709; Referee: Martin Petersen

6 November 2021 11	RB Leipzig	2–1	Borussia Dortmund	Leipzig
18:30 CET (UTC+1)	Nkunku 29'; Adams (yellow card) 40'; Poulsen (yellow card) 65', (goal) 68'; Szoboszlai (yellow card) 88'	Report	Bellingham (yellow card) 31'; Reus (yellow card) 31', (goal) 52'; Witsel (yellow card) 38'; Meunier (yellow card) 55'; Moukoko (yellow card) 89'	Stadium: Red Bull Arena; Attendance: 43,429; Referee: Felix Zwayer

20 November 2021 12	Borussia Dortmund	2–1	VfB Stuttgart	Dortmund
15:30 CET (UTC+1)	Malen 56'; Reus 85'	Report	Coulibaly (yellow card) 36'; Anton (yellow card) 48'; Massimo 63'	Stadium: Signal Iduna Park; Attendance: 57,900; Referee: Harm Osmers

27 November 2021 13	VfL Wolfsburg	1–3	Borussia Dortmund	Wolfsburg
15:30 CET (UTC+1)	Weghorst 2'; Lukebakio (yellow card) 25'; Lacroix (yellow card) 32'; L. Nmecha (yellow card) 37'; Arnold (yellow card) 42'	Report	Can 35' (pen.); Malen 55'; Wolf (yellow card) 60'; Haaland 81'	Stadium: Volkswagen Arena; Attendance: 13,281; Referee: Sven Jablonski

4 December 2021 14	Borussia Dortmund	2–3	Bayern Munich	Dortmund
18:30 CET (UTC+1)	Brandt 5'; Haaland 48'; Can (yellow card) 51'; Bellingham (yellow card) 86'	Report	Lewandowski 9', 77' (pen.), (yellow card) 88'; Coman 44'; Upamecano (yellow card) 90+5'	Stadium: Signal Iduna Park; Attendance: 15,000; Referee: Felix Zwayer

11 December 2021 15	VfL Bochum	1–1	Borussia Dortmund	Bochum
15:30 CET (UTC+1)	Polter 40' (pen.)	Report	Schulz (yellow card) 57'; Hummels (yellow card) 58'; Brandt 85'; Zagadou (yellow card) 90'	Stadium: Vonovia Ruhrstadion; Attendance: 13,799; Referee: Matthias Jöllenbeck

15 December 2021 16	Borussia Dortmund	3–0	Greuther Fürth	Dortmund
20:30 CET (UTC+1)	Hummels (yellow card) 15'; Haaland 33' (pen.), 82'; Bellingham (yellow card) 43'; Malen 89'	Report	Bauer (yellow card) 32'; Willems (yellow card) 43'	Stadium: Signal Iduna Park; Attendance: 15,000; Referee: Daniel Schlager

18 December 2021 17	Hertha BSC	3–2	Borussia Dortmund	Berlin
18:30 CET (UTC+1)	Belfodil 51'; Richter 57', 69'	Report	Brandt 31'; Tigges 83'; Pongračić (yellow card) 90+5'	Stadium: Olympiastadion; Attendance: 5,000; Referee: Marco Fritz

8 January 2022 18	Eintracht Frankfurt	2–3	Borussia Dortmund	Frankfurt
18:30 CET (UTC+1)	Borré 15', 24', (yellow card) 90'; Hinteregger (yellow card) 87'; Chandler (yellow card) 88'	Report	Hazard 71', (yellow card) 90'; Bellingham 87'; Haaland (yellow card) 87'; Dahoud 89'	Stadium: Deutsche Bank Park; Attendance: 250; Referee: Robert Schröder

14 January 2022 19	Borussia Dortmund	5–1	SC Freiburg	Dortmund
20:30 CET (UTC+1)	Meunier 14', 29'; Haaland 45+1', 75', (yellow card) 88'; Brandt (yellow card) 76'; Dahoud 86'	Report	Demirović 61'	Stadium: Signal Iduna Park; Attendance: 750; Referee: Florian Badstübner

22 January 2022 20	1899 Hoffenheim	2–3	Borussia Dortmund	Sinsheim
15:30 CET (UTC+1)	Kramarić 45+1'; Rudy (yellow card) 66'; Rutter 77'; Dabbur (yellow card) 90+3'	Report	Haaland 6'; Hummels (yellow card) 49'; Reus 58'; Raum 66' (o.g.); Bellingham (yellow card) 90+5'	Stadium: Rhein-Neckar-Arena; Attendance: 500; Referee: Deniz Aytekin

6 February 2022 21	Borussia Dortmund	2–5	Bayer Leverkusen	Dortmund
15:30 CET (UTC+1)	Frimpong 16' (o.g.); Dahoud (yellow card) 26'; Tigges 89'	Report	Akanji 11' (o.g.); Wirtz 20'; Andrich 28'; Bellarabi (yellow card) 46'; Tah 53'; Diaby 87'	Stadium: Signal Iduna Park; Attendance: 10,000; Referee: Daniel Siebert

13 February 2022 22	Union Berlin	0–3	Borussia Dortmund	Berlin
15:30 CET (UTC+1)	Baumgartl (yellow card) 35'; Möhwald (yellow card) 76'; Knoche (yellow card) 90+2'; Schäfer (yellow card) 90+5'	Report	Reus 18', 25'; Brandt (yellow card) 39'; Guerreiro 71'	Stadium: Stadion An der Alten Försterei; Attendance: 10,000; Referee: Matthias Jöllenbeck

20 February 2022 23	Borussia Dortmund	6–0	Borussia Mönchengladbach	Dortmund
17:30 CET (UTC+1)	Zagadou (yellow card) 12'; Reus 26', 81'; Malen 32'; Dahoud (yellow card) 35'; Wolf 70'; Moukoko 74'; Can 90+1' (pen.)	Report	Bensebaini (yellow card) 14'	Stadium: Signal Iduna Park; Attendance: 10,000; Referee: Marco Fritz

27 February 2022 24	FC Augsburg	1–1	Borussia Dortmund	Augsburg
17:30 CET (UTC+1)	Vargas (yellow card) 19'; Dorsch (yellow card) 47'; Sarenren Bazee 78'	Report	Hazard 35'; Bellingham (yellow card) 87'	Stadium: WWK Arena; Attendance: 15,330; Referee: Deniz Aytekin

13 March 2022 26	Borussia Dortmund	1–0	Arminia Bielefeld	Dortmund
17:30 CET (UTC+1)	Wolf 21'; Can (yellow card) 46'	Report	Brunner (yellow card) 19'	Stadium: Signal Iduna Park; Attendance: 33,000; Referee: Bastian Dankert

16 March 2022 25	Mainz 05	0–1	Borussia Dortmund	Mainz
18:30 CET (UTC+1)	Bell (yellow card) 43'; Stach (yellow card) 49'; Lucoqui (yellow card) 90+2'	Report	Wolf (yellow card) 43'; Dahoud (yellow card) 44'; Pongračić (yellow card) 45+3'; Witsel 87', (yellow card) 90+3'	Stadium: Opel Arena; Attendance: 25,000; Referee: Sascha Stegemann
Note: The match was originally scheduled for 6 March 2022, but was postponed due to a COVID-19 outbreak in Mainz 05's squad.

20 March 2022 27	1. FC Köln	1–1	Borussia Dortmund	Cologne
19:30 CET (UTC+1)	Andersson 36'; Özcan (yellow card) 67'; Duda (yellow card) 76'	Report	Wolf 8', (yellow card) 30'; Witsel (yellow card) 43'; Can (yellow card) 47'	Stadium: RheinEnergieStadion; Attendance: 50,000; Referee: Daniel Siebert

2 April 2022 28	Borussia Dortmund	1–4	RB Leipzig	Dortmund
18:30 CEST (UTC+2)	Hazard (yellow card) 45'; Can (yellow card) 80'; Malen 84', (yellow card) 88'	Report	Laimer 21', 30'; Kampl (yellow card) 54'; Nkunku 58'; Olmo 86'	Stadium: Signal Iduna Park; Attendance: 81,365; Referee: Marco Fritz

8 April 2022 29	VfB Stuttgart	0–2	Borussia Dortmund	Stuttgart
20:30 CEST (UTC+2)	Mangala (yellow card) 45+3'; Karazor (yellow card) 86'	Report	Brandt 12', 71'; Bellingham (yellow card) 82'	Stadium: Mercedes-Benz Arena; Attendance: 58,248; Referee: Harm Osmers

16 April 2022 30	Borussia Dortmund	6–1	VfL Wolfsburg	Dortmund
15:30 CEST (UTC+2)	Rothe 24'; Witsel 26'; Akanji 28'; Can 35'; Haaland 38', 54'	Report	Baku (yellow card) 33', (goal) 82'; Gerhardt (yellow card) 41'	Stadium: Signal Iduna Park; Attendance: 79,200; Referee: Robert Schröder

23 April 2022 31	Bayern Munich	3–1	Borussia Dortmund	Munich
18:30 CEST (UTC+2)	Gnabry 15'; Lewandowski 34'; Musiala 83'	Report	Can (yellow card) 40', (goal) 52' (pen.)	Stadium: Allianz Arena; Attendance: 75,000; Referee: Daniel Siebert

30 April 2022 32	Borussia Dortmund	3–4	VfL Bochum	Dortmund
15:30 CEST (UTC+2)	Haaland 18' (pen.), 30' (pen.), 62'; Bellingham (yellow card) 24'; Brandt (yellow card) 55'; Rothe (yellow card) 89'; Papadopoulos (yellow card) 90+3'	Report	Polter 3'; Holtmann 8'; Losilla (yellow card) 31'; Mašović (yellow card) 35'; Locadia 81'; Pantović 85' (pen.); Zoller (yellow card) 90+2'	Stadium: Signal Iduna Park; Attendance: 81,365; Referee: Robert Hartmann

7 May 2022 33	Greuther Fürth	1–3	Borussia Dortmund	Fürth
15:30 CEST (UTC+2)	Tillman (yellow card) 51'; Ngankam 70'	Report	Brandt 26', 72'; Passlack 77'; Akanji (yellow card) 82'	Stadium: Sportpark Ronhof; Attendance: 16,600; Referee: Christian Dingert

14 May 2022 34	Borussia Dortmund	2–1	Hertha BSC	Dortmund
15:30 CEST (UTC+2)	Haaland 68' (pen.); Moukoko 84'	Report	Belfodil 18' (pen.); Ascacíbar (yellow card) 66'; Plattenhardt (yellow card) 66'	Stadium: Signal Iduna Park; Attendance: 80,500; Referee: Tobias Stieler

=== DFB-Pokal ===
7 August 2021 First round	Wehen Wiesbaden	0–3	Borussia Dortmund	Wiesbaden
20:45 CEST (UTC+2)	Rieble (yellow card) 9'; Goppel (yellow card) 43'; Taffertshofer (yellow card) 44'	Report	Haaland 26', 31' (pen.), 51'; Schulz (yellow card) 64'	Stadium: Brita-Arena; Attendance: 4,882; Referee: Benjamin Cortus

26 October 2021 Second round	Borussia Dortmund	2–0	FC Ingolstadt	Dortmund
20:00 CEST (UTC+2)	Meunier (yellow card) 5'; Hazard 72', 81'	Report	Röhl (yellow card) 13'; Röseler (yellow card) 62'	Stadium: Signal Iduna Park; Attendance: 28,000; Referee: Matthias Jöllenbeck

18 January 2022 Round of 16	FC St. Pauli	2–1	Borussia Dortmund	Hamburg
20:45 CET (UTC+1)	Amenyido 4'; Witsel 40' (o.g.)	Report	Haaland 58' (pen.)	Stadium: Millerntor-Stadion; Attendance: 2,000; Referee: Harm Osmers

=== DFL-Supercup ===
17 August 2021 Final	Borussia Dortmund	1–3	Bayern Munich	Dortmund
20:30 CEST (UTC+2)	Reus (yellow card) 25', (goal) 64'; Dahoud (yellow card) 32'	Report	Süle (yellow card) 23'; Lewandowski 41', 74'; Müller 50'; Sané (yellow card) 83'; Choupo-Moting (yellow card) 90+3'	Stadium: Signal Iduna Park; Attendance: 24,742; Referee: Sascha Stegemann

=== UEFA Champions League ===
==== Group stage ====
The draw for the group stage was held on 26 August 2021.

Pos	Team	Pld	W	D	L	GF	GA	GD	Pts	Qualification	AJX	SPO	DOR	BES
1	(Netherlands) Ajax	6	6	0	0	20	5	+15	18	Advance to knockout phase	—	4–2	4–0	2–0
2	(Portugal) Sporting CP	6	3	0	3	14	12	+2	9 (Note: Tied on head-to-head points. Head-to-head goal difference: Sporting CP +1, Borussia Dortmund −1.)	Advance to knockout phase	1–5	—	3–1	4–0
3	(Germany) Borussia Dortmund	6	3	0	3	10	11	−1	9	Transfer to Europa League	1–3	1–0	—	5–0
4	(Turkey) Beşiktaş	6	0	0	6	3	19	−16	0		1–2	1–4	1–2	—

Source: UEFA
Rules for classification: Group stage tiebreakers
Notes:

15 September 2021 1	Beşiktaş (Turkey)	1–2	(Germany) Borussia Dortmund	Istanbul, Turkey
18:45 CEST (UTC+2)	Welinton (yellow card) 43'; Montero (yellow card) 45', (goal) 90+3'; Hutchinson (yellow card) 76'	Report	Bellingham 20'; Haaland 45+3'; Meunier (yellow card) 55'; Moukoko (yellow card) 79'	Stadium: Vodafone Park; Attendance: 22,445; Referee: Antonio Mateu Lahoz (Spain)

28 September 2021 2	Borussia Dortmund (Germany)	1–0	(Portugal) Sporting CP	Dortmund, Germany
21:00 CEST (UTC+2)	Malen 37'; Bellingham (yellow card) 42'; Hummels (yellow card) 59'	Report	Nunes (yellow card) 42'; Neto (yellow card) 90'	Stadium: Westfalenstadion; Attendance: 25,000; Referee: Srđan Jovanović (Serbia)

19 October 2021 3	Ajax (Netherlands)	4–0	(Germany) Borussia Dortmund	Amsterdam, Netherlands
21:00 CEST (UTC+2)	Reus 11' (o.g.); Blind 25'; Álvarez (yellow card) 33'; Antony 57'; Haller 72'; Timber (yellow card) 90+2'	Report	Witsel (yellow card) 42'	Stadium: Johan Cruyff Arena; Attendance: 54,029; Referee: Jesús Gil Manzano (Spain)

3 November 2021 4	Borussia Dortmund (Germany)	1–3	(Netherlands) Ajax	Dortmund, Germany
21:00 CET (UTC+1)	Hummels (red card) 29'; Reus 37' (pen.); Knauff (yellow card) 79'	Report	Álvarez (yellow card) 39'; Tadić 72'; Haller 83'; Klaassen 90+3'	Stadium: Westfalenstadion; Attendance: 54,820; Referee: Michael Oliver (England)

24 November 2021 5	Sporting CP (Portugal)	3–1	(Germany) Borussia Dortmund	Lisbon, Portugal
20:00 WET (UTC±0)	Gonçalves 30', 39', (penalty missed) 81'; Palhinha (yellow card) 55'; Coates (yellow card) 57'; Paulinho (yellow card) 74'; Nunes (yellow card) 74'; Porro (yellow card) 74', (goal) 81'; Adán (yellow card) 90+8'	Report	Reus (yellow card) 74'; Zagadou (yellow card) 74'; Can (red card) 74'; Malen 90+3'	Stadium: Estádio José Alvalade; Attendance: 41,341; Referee: Carlos del Cerro Grande (Spain)

7 December 2021 6	Borussia Dortmund (Germany)	5–0	(Turkey) Beşiktaş	Dortmund, Germany
21:00 CET (UTC+1)	Malen 29'; Reus 45+2' (pen.), 53'; Haaland 68', 81'	Report	Montero (yellow card) 31'; Larin (yellow card) 39'; Welinton (red card) 43'; Souza (yellow card) 44'	Stadium: Westfalenstadion; Attendance: 15,000; Referee: François Letexier (France)

=== UEFA Europa League ===
==== Knockout phase ====
===== Knockout round play-offs =====
The knockout round play-offs draw was held on 13 December 2021.

17 February 2022 First leg	Borussia Dortmund (Germany)	2–4	(Scotland) Rangers	Dortmund, Germany
18:45 CET (UTC+1)	Bellingham 51'; Zagadou (yellow card) 73'; Guerreiro 82'	Report	Tavernier 38' (pen.); Morelos 41'; Lundstram 49'; Zagadou 54' (o.g.); McGregor (yellow card) 79'	Stadium: Westfalenstadion; Attendance: 10,000; Referee: Clément Turpin (France)

24 February 2022 Second leg	Rangers (Scotland)	2–2 (6–4 agg.)	(Germany) Borussia Dortmund	Glasgow, Scotland
21:00 CET (UTC+1)	Tavernier 22' (pen.), 57'; Lundstram (yellow card) 39'	Report	Bellingham 31', (yellow card) 51'; Malen 42'; Schulz (yellow card) 55'; Can (yellow card) 67'	Stadium: Ibrox Stadium; Attendance: 47,709; Referee: Antonio Mateu Lahoz (Spain)

== Statistics ==
=== Appearances and goals ===
No.	Pos	Nat	Player	Total		Bundesliga		DFB-Pokal		Champions League		Europa League		DFL-Supercup	
No.	Pos	Nat	Player	Apps	Goals	Apps	Goals	Apps	Goals	Apps	Goals	Apps	Goals	Apps	Goals
Goalkeepers
1	GK	(Switzerland) SUI	Gregor Kobel	40	0	29	0	2	0	6	0	2	0	1	0
25	GK	(Germany) GER	Luca Unbehaun	0	0	0	0	0	0	0	0	0	0	0	0
35	GK	(Switzerland) SUI	Marwin Hitz	6	0	4+1	0	1	0	0	0	0	0	0	0
38	GK	(Switzerland) SUI	Roman Bürki	1	0	1	0	0	0	0	0	0	0	0	0
40	GK	(Germany) GER	Stefan Drljača	0	0	0	0	0	0	0	0	0	0	0	0
Defenders
2	DF	(Spain) ESP	Mateu Morey	0	0	0	0	0	0	0	0	0	0	0	0
4	DF	(France) FRA	Soumaïla Coulibaly	0	0	0	0	0	0	0	0	0	0	0	0
5	DF	(France) FRA	Dan-Axel Zagadou	19	0	10+5	0	0+1	0	1+1	0	1	0	0	0
13	DF	(Portugal) POR	Raphaël Guerreiro	28	5	21+2	4	1	0	2+1	0	1	1	0	0
14	DF	(Germany) GER	Nico Schulz	24	0	9+7	0	1	0	3+1	0	1+1	0	1	0
15	DF	(Germany) GER	Mats Hummels	32	1	20+3	1	2	0	5	0	2	0	0	0
16	DF	(Switzerland) SUI	Manuel Akanji	36	1	25+1	1	2+1	0	5	0	1	0	1	0
24	DF	(Belgium) BEL	Thomas Meunier	26	2	17	2	2	0	6	0	1	0	0	0
29	DF	(Germany) GER	Marcel Schmelzer	0	0	0	0	0	0	0	0	0	0	0	0
30	DF	(Germany) GER	Felix Passlack	15	1	5+5	1	1+1	0	0+2	0	0	0	1	0
34	DF	(Croatia) CRO	Marin Pongračić	23	0	9+8	0	1	0	1+4	0	0	0	0	0
36	DF	(Germany) GER	Tom Rothe	2	1	1+1	1	0	0	0	0	0	0	0	0
37	DF	(Germany) GER	Lion Semić	1	0	0+1	0	0	0	0	0	0	0	0	0
45	DF	(United States) USA	Lennard Maloney	2	0	0+2	0	0	0	0	0	0	0	0	0
Midfielders
7	MF	(United States) USA	Giovanni Reyna	13	2	6+4	2	1	0	0	0	0+1	0	1	0
8	MF	(Germany) GER	Mahmoud Dahoud	30	2	20+2	2	1	0	3+1	0	2	0	1	0
10	MF	(Belgium) BEL	Thorgan Hazard	30	6	14+9	4	1+2	2	2+1	0	1	0	0	0
19	MF	(Germany) GER	Julian Brandt	40	9	22+9	9	2	0	4+1	0	2	0	0	0
20	MF	(Brazil) BRA	Reinier	20	0	1+12	0	1	0	1+2	0	0+2	0	0+1	0
22	MF	(England) ENG	Jude Bellingham	44	6	32	3	3	0	6	1	2	2	1	0
23	MF	(Germany) GER	Emre Can	29	5	20+5	5	1	0	0+2	0	1	0	0	0
28	MF	(Belgium) BEL	Axel Witsel	40	2	22+6	2	2+1	0	5+1	0	1+1	0	1	0
32	MF	(Guinea) GUI	Abdoulaye Kamara	0	0	0	0	0	0	0	0	0	0	0	0
39	MF	(Germany) GER	Marius Wolf	35	3	15+12	3	1	0	2+3	0	0+1	0	0+1	0
44	MF	(Netherlands) NED	Immanuel Pherai	1	0	0+1	0	0	0	0	0	0	0	0	0
47	MF	(Germany) GER	Antonios Papadopoulos	3	0	0+2	0	1	0	0	0	0	0	0	0
Forwards
9	FW	(Norway) NOR	Erling Haaland	30	29	21+3	22	2	4	2+1	3	0	0	1	0
11	FW	(Germany) GER	Marco Reus	41	13	29	9	2+1	0	6	3	2	0	1	1
18	FW	(Germany) GER	Youssoufa Moukoko	22	2	1+15	2	0+2	0	0+1	0	0+2	0	1	0
21	FW	(Netherlands) NED	Donyell Malen	38	9	20+7	5	0+2	0	5+1	3	2	1	0+1	0
27	FW	(Germany) GER	Steffen Tigges	15	3	0+9	3	2	0	1+1	0	0+2	0	0	0
43	FW	(England) ENG	Jamie Bynoe-Gittens	4	0	1+3	0	0	0	0	0	0	0	0	0
46	FW	(Croatia) CRO	Marco Pašalić	1	0	0	0	0	0	0	0	0	0	0+1	0
Players transferred out during the season
6	MF	(Denmark) DEN	Thomas Delaney	2	0	0+1	0	0+1	0	0	0	0	0	0	0
36	FW	(Germany) GER	Ansgar Knauff	9	0	0+5	0	0+1	0	0+3	0	0	0	0	0
37	MF	(Germany) GER	Tobias Raschl	0	0	0	0	0	0	0	0	0	0	0	0

Last updated: 14 May 2022
Source: Competitions

=== Goalscorers ===
Rank	Pos.	No.	Nat.	Player	Bundesliga	DFB-Pokal	Champions League	Europa League	DFL-Supercup	Total
1	FW	9	(Norway)	Erling Haaland	22	4	3	0	0	29
2	FW	11	(Germany)	Marco Reus	9	0	3	0	1	13
3	MF	19	(Germany)	Julian Brandt	9	0	0	0	0	9
3	FW	21	(Netherlands)	Donyell Malen	5	0	3	1	0	9
5	MF	10	(Belgium)	Thorgan Hazard	4	2	0	0	0	6
5	MF	22	(England)	Jude Bellingham	3	0	1	2	0	6
7	DF	13	(Portugal)	Raphaël Guerreiro	4	0	0	1	0	5
7	MF	23	(Germany)	Emre Can	5	0	0	0	0	5
9	FW	27	(Germany)	Steffen Tigges	3	0	0	0	0	3
9	MF	39	(Germany)	Marius Wolf	3	0	0	0	0	3
11	MF	7	(United States)	Giovanni Reyna	2	0	0	0	0	2
11	MF	8	(Germany)	Mahmoud Dahoud	2	0	0	0	0	2
11	FW	18	(Germany)	Youssoufa Moukoko	2	0	0	0	0	2
11	DF	24	(Belgium)	Thomas Meunier	2	0	0	0	0	2
11	MF	28	(Belgium)	Axel Witsel	2	0	0	0	0	2
16	DF	15	(Germany)	Mats Hummels	1	0	0	0	0	1
16	DF	16	(Switzerland)	Manuel Akanji	1	0	0	0	0	1
16	DF	30	(Germany)	Felix Passlack	1	0	0	0	0	1
16	DF	36	(Germany)	Tom Rothe	1	0	0	0	0	1
Own goals					4	0	0	0	0	4
Totals					85	6	10	4	'1	106

Last updated: 14 May 2022
