= 2020–21 Borussia Dortmund season =

112th season in existence of Borussia Dortmund

Borussia Dortmund
2020–21 season
- President: Reinhard Rauball
- Chairman: Hans-Joachim Watzke
- Head coach: Lucien Favre (until 13 December); Edin Terzić (interim, from 13 December until the end of season)
- Stadium: Signal Iduna Park
- Bundesliga: 3rd
- DFB-Pokal: Winners
- DFL-Supercup: Runners-up
- UEFA Champions League: Quarter-finals
- Top goalscorer: League: Erling Haaland (27); All: Erling Haaland (41)
Home colours	Away colours	Third/Cup away colours

The 2020–21 season was the 112th season in the existence of Borussia Dortmund and the club's 45th consecutive season in the top flight of German football. In addition to the domestic league, Borussia Dortmund participated in this season's editions of the DFB-Pokal, the DFL-Supercup, and the UEFA Champions League. The season covered the period from 1 July 2020 to 30 June 2021.

== Players ==
=== First-team squad ===
As of 14 April 2021

Note: Flags indicate national team as defined under FIFA eligibility rules; some limited exceptions apply. Players may hold more than one non-FIFA nationality.

No.	Pos.	Nation	Player
1	GK	SUI	Roman Bürki
2	DF	ESP	Mateu Morey
5	DF	FRA	Dan-Axel Zagadou
6	MF	DEN	Thomas Delaney
7	MF	ENG	Jadon Sancho
8	MF	GER	Mahmoud Dahoud
9	FW	NOR	Erling Haaland
10	FW	BEL	Thorgan Hazard
11	FW	GER	Marco Reus (captain)
13	DF	POR	Raphaël Guerreiro
14	DF	GER	Nico Schulz
15	DF	GER	Mats Hummels
16	DF	SUI	Manuel Akanji
18	FW	GER	Youssoufa Moukoko
19	MF	GER	Julian Brandt

No.	Pos.	Nation	Player
20	MF	BRA	Reinier (on loan from Real Madrid)
22	MF	ENG	Jude Bellingham
23	MF	GER	Emre Can
24	DF	BEL	Thomas Meunier
25	GK	GER	Luca Unbehaun
26	DF	POL	Łukasz Piszczek (vice-captain)
27	FW	GER	Steffen Tigges
28	MF	BEL	Axel Witsel
29	DF	GER	Marcel Schmelzer
30	DF	GER	Felix Passlack
32	MF	USA	Giovanni Reyna
35	GK	SUI	Marwin Hitz
36	MF	GER	Ansgar Knauff
37	MF	GER	Tobias Raschl

=== Out on loan ===
Note: Flags indicate national team as defined under FIFA eligibility rules; some limited exceptions apply. Players may hold more than one non-FIFA nationality.

No.	Pos.	Nation	Player
—	DF	ARG	Leonardo Balerdi (at Olympique de Marseille until 30 June 2021)
—	DF	GER	Jeremy Toljan (at Sassuolo until 30 June 2021)
—	MF	ESP	Sergio Gómez (at Huesca until 30 June 2021)

No.	Pos.	Nation	Player
—	MF	NED	Immanuel Pherai (at Zwolle until 30 June 2021)
—	MF	GER	Marius Wolf (at Köln until 30 June 2021)

== Transfers ==
=== In ===
No.	Pos	Player	Transferred from	Fee	Date	Source
24	DF	(Belgium) Thomas Meunier	(France) Paris Saint-Germain	Free	1 July 2020	
22	MF	(England) Jude Bellingham	(England) Birmingham City	€25,000,000	18 July 2020	
20	MF	(Brazil) Reinier	(Spain) Real Madrid	Loan	19 August 2020	

=== Out ===
No.	Pos	Player	Transferred to	Fee	Date	Source
10	MF	(Germany) Mario Götze	(Netherlands) PSV Eindhoven	Contract expired	1 July 2020	
21	FW	(Germany) André Schürrle	Retired	Contract expired	1 July 2020	
40	GK	(Germany) Eric Oelschlägel	(Netherlands) FC Utrecht	Contract expired	1 July 2020	
36	DF	(Turkey) Ömer Toprak	(Germany) Werder Bremen	€3,500,000	15 July 2020	
18	DF	(Argentina) Leonardo Balerdi	(France) Marseille	Loan	21 July 2020	
32	MF	(Germany) Dženis Burnić	(Germany) FC Heidenheim	Undisclosed	3 August 2020	
	MF	(Netherlands) Immanuel Pherai	(Netherlands) PEC Zwolle	Loan	17 September 2020	
27	MF	(Germany) Marius Wolf	(Germany) 1. FC Köln	Loan	2 October 2020	

== Kits ==
Home	Home alt.	Away	Third	UCL Home	UCL Home alt.

=== Goalkeeper ===
1st (2020–21)	2nd (2020–21)	3rd (2020–21)	4th (2020–21)

== Pre-season and friendlies ==
Win Draw Loss

12 August 2020 Friendly	Rheindorf Altach	0–6	Borussia Dortmund	Altach, Austria
17:00 CEST (UTC+2)		Report	Reyna 14'; Haaland 36' (pen.), 45+2'; Hazard 75' (pen.); Can 85'; Brandt 90'	Stadium: Cashpoint-Arena; Attendance: 0

16 August 2020 Friendly	Borussia Dortmund	11–2	Austria Wien	Altach, Austria
16:00 CEST (UTC+2)	Reyna 9', 23'; Guerreiro 41'; Pherai 44'; Sancho 52'; Can 65'; Wolf 73'; Hazard 76' (pen.); Bellingham 77'; Duman 81'; Schulz 86'	Report	Monschein 33'; Jukic 53'	Stadium: Cashpoint-Arena; Attendance: 0 Referee: Andreas Heiß (Austria)

22 August 2020 Traditions Cup	MSV Duisburg	1–5	Borussia Dortmund	Duisburg, Germany
15:30 CEST (UTC+2)	Engin 28'	Report	Reyna 13'; Hazard 14'; Sancho 26'; Knauff 49', 60'	Stadium: Schauinsland-Reisen-Arena; Attendance: 0
Note: Match was played in two 30-minute halves.

22 August 2020 Traditions Cup	Borussia Dortmund	1–3	Feyenoord	Duisburg, Germany
16:45 CEST (UTC+2)	Witsel 53'	Report	Jørgensen 17', 34'; Botteghin 24'	Stadium: Schauinsland-Reisen-Arena; Attendance: 0
Note: Match was played in two 30-minute halves.

28 August 2020 Friendly	Borussia Dortmund	1–1	SC Paderborn	Dortmund, Germany
15:30 CEST (UTC+2)	Pherai 30'	Report	Pröger 67'	Stadium: BVB-Fußballpark Hohenbuschei; Attendance: 0

28 August 2020 Friendly	Borussia Dortmund	1–3	VfL Bochum	Dortmund, Germany
18:00 CEST (UTC+2)	Hummels 67'	Report	Ganvoula 17', 46'; Zoller 25'	Stadium: Signal Iduna Park; Attendance: 0

7 September 2020 Friendly	Borussia Dortmund	2–1	Sparta Rotterdam	Dortmund, Germany
17:00 CEST (UTC+2)	Reus 63'; Pherai 66'	Report	Emegha 81'	Stadium: BVB-Fußballpark Hohenbuschei; Attendance: 0

10 October 2020 Friendly	Borussia Dortmund	Cancelled	Anderlecht	Dortmund, Germany
15:00 CEST (UTC+2)				Stadium: BVB-Fußballpark Hohenbuschei
Note: The match was called off after an Anderlecht club member tested positive for COVID-19.

== Competitions ==
=== Overview ===
Competition	First match	Last match	Starting round	Final position	Record							
Competition	First match	Last match	Starting round	Final position	Pld	W	D	L	GF	GA	GD	Win %
Bundesliga	19 September 2020	22 May 2021	Matchday 1	3rd	34	20	4	10	75	46	+29	58.82
DFB-Pokal	14 September 2020	13 May 2021	First round	Winners	6	6	0	0	20	3	+17	100.00
DFL-Supercup	30 September 2020		Final	Runners-up	1	0	0	1	2	3	−1	0.00
UEFA Champions League	20 October 2020	14 April 2021	Group stage	Quarter-finals	10	5	2	3	19	13	+6	50.00
Total					51	31	6	14	116	65	+51	60.78

Source: Soccerway

=== Bundesliga ===
==== League table ====
Pos	Team	Pld	W	D	L	GF	GA	GD	Pts	Qualification or relegation
1	Bayern Munich (C)	34	24	6	4	99	44	+55	78	Qualification for the Champions League group stage
2	RB Leipzig	34	19	8	7	60	32	+28	65	Qualification for the Champions League group stage
3	Borussia Dortmund	34	20	4	10	75	46	+29	64	Qualification for the Champions League group stage
4	VfL Wolfsburg	34	17	10	7	61	37	+24	61	Qualification for the Champions League group stage
5	Eintracht Frankfurt	34	16	12	6	69	53	+16	60	Qualification for the Europa League group stage (Note: Since the winners of the 2020–21 DFB-Pokal, Borussia Dortmund, qualified for the Champions League based on league position, the Europa League group stage spot was passed to the sixth-placed team, and the Europa Conference League play-off round spot was passed to the seventh-placed team.)

Source: DFB
Rules for classification: 1) Points; 2) Goal difference; 3) Goals scored; 4) Head-to-head results; 5) Head-to-head away goals scored; 6) Away goals scored; 7) Play-off.
(C) Champions

==== Results summary ====
Overall								Home						Away					
Pld	W	D	L	GF	GA	GD	Pts	W	D	L	GF	GA	GD	W	D	L	GF	GA	GD
34	20	4	10	75	46	+29	64	11	2	4	40	20	+20	9	2	6	35	26	+9

Source: DFB

==== Results by round ====
Round	1	2	3	4	5	6	7	8	9	10	11	12	13	14	15	16	17	18	19	20	21	22	23	24	25	26	27	28	29	30	31	32	33	34
Ground	H	A	H	A	H	A	H	A	H	A	H	A	A	H	A	H	A	A	H	A	H	A	H	A	H	A	H	A	H	H	A	H	A	H
Result	W	L	W	W	W	W	L	W	L	D	L	W	L	W	W	D	L	L	W	L	D	W	W	L	W	D	L	W	W	W	W	W	W	W
Position	3	10	5	3	3	2	3	2	4	4	5	4	5	4	4	4	4	8	6	6	6	6	5	6	5	5	5	5	5	5	5	4	3	3

Source: DFB
A = Away; H = Home; W = Win; D = Draw; L = Loss

==== Matches ====
The league fixtures were announced on 7 August 2020.

19 September 2020 1	Borussia Dortmund	3–0	Borussia Mönchengladbach	Dortmund
18:30 CEST (UTC+2)	Akanji (yellow card) 13'; Reyna 35'; Haaland 54' (pen.), 77'	Report	Stindl (yellow card) 39'	Stadium: Signal Iduna Park; Attendance: 9,300; Referee: Felix Brych

26 September 2020 2	FC Augsburg	2–0	Borussia Dortmund	Augsburg
15:30 CEST (UTC+2)	Gregoritsch (yellow card) 29'; Khedira (yellow card) 30'; Gouweleeuw (yellow card) 31'; Uduokhai 40'; Caligiuri 54'	Report	Haaland (yellow card) 30'; Meunier (yellow card) 38'; Witsel (yellow card) 71'; Can (yellow card) 76'	Stadium: WWK Arena; Attendance: 6,000; Referee: Martin Petersen

3 October 2020 3	Borussia Dortmund	4–0	SC Freiburg	Dortmund
15:30 CEST (UTC+2)	Haaland 31', 66'; Can 47'; Hummels (yellow card) 55'; Passlack 90+2'	Report	Kwon (yellow card) 57'	Stadium: Signal Iduna Park; Attendance: 11,500; Referee: Guido Winkmann

17 October 2020 4	1899 Hoffenheim	0–1	Borussia Dortmund	Sinsheim
15:30 CEST (UTC+2)	Posch (yellow card) 58'	Report	Reus 76'; Reyna (yellow card) 90'	Stadium: Rhein-Neckar-Arena; Attendance: 6,030; Referee: Sascha Stegemann

24 October 2020 5	Borussia Dortmund	3–0	Schalke 04	Dortmund
18:30 CEST (UTC+2)	Akanji 55'; Haaland 61'; Hummels 78'	Report	Mascarell (yellow card) 13'	Stadium: Signal Iduna Park; Attendance: 300; Referee: Felix Zwayer

31 October 2020 6	Arminia Bielefeld	0–2	Borussia Dortmund	Bielefeld
15:30 CET (UTC+1)	Brunner (yellow card) 26'	Report	Hummels 53', 71'; Delaney (yellow card) 63'	Stadium: Bielefelder Alm; Attendance: 0 Referee: Bastian Dankert

7 November 2020 7	Borussia Dortmund	2–3	Bayern Munich	Dortmund
18:30 CET (UTC+1)	Reus 45'; Delaney (yellow card) 45+3'; Haaland 83'; Witsel (yellow card) 90+1'	Report	Kimmich (yellow card) 36'; Alaba 45+4'; Lewandowski 48', (yellow card) 82'; Sané 80'	Stadium: Signal Iduna Park; Attendance: 0 Referee: Manuel Gräfe

21 November 2020 8	Hertha BSC	2–5	Borussia Dortmund	Berlin
20:30 CET (UTC+1)	Cunha 33', 79' (pen.), (yellow card) 61'	Report	Guerreiro (yellow card) 10', (goal) 70'; Haaland 47', 49', 62', 79'	Stadium: Olympiastadion; Attendance: 0 Referee: Bastian Dankert

28 November 2020 9	Borussia Dortmund	1–2	1. FC Köln	Dortmund
15:30 CET (UTC+1)	Can (yellow card) 54'; Hazard 74'	Report	Skhiri 9', 60', (yellow card) 29'; Jakobs (yellow card) 90+1'	Stadium: Signal Iduna Park; Attendance: 0 Referee: Arne Aarnink

5 December 2020 10	Eintracht Frankfurt	1–1	Borussia Dortmund	Frankfurt
15:30 CET (UTC+1)	Kamada 9', (yellow card) 47'; Ndicka (yellow card) 41'; Rode (yellow card) 60'; Sow (yellow card) 64'; Kostić (yellow card) 82'; Abraham (yellow card) 85'	Report	Reyna 56'; Can (yellow card) 88'	Stadium: Deutsche Bank Park; Attendance: 0 Referee: Guido Winkmann

12 December 2020 11	Borussia Dortmund	1–5	VfB Stuttgart	Dortmund
15:30 CET (UTC+1)	Can (yellow card) 26'; Reyna 39'; Morey (yellow card) 66'	Report	Silas 26' (pen.), 53', (yellow card) 50'; Mavropanos (yellow card) 28'; Endo (yellow card) 40'; Förster 60'; Coulibaly 63'; González 90+1'	Stadium: Signal Iduna Park; Attendance: 0 Referee: Christian Dingert

15 December 2020 12	Werder Bremen	1–2	Borussia Dortmund	Bremen
20:30 CET (UTC+1)	Möhwald 28'; Groß (yellow card) 54'; Woltemade (yellow card) 87'; Schmid (yellow card) 90+2'	Report	Guerreiro 12'; Reus (yellow card) 35', (penalty missed) 77', 78'; Witsel (yellow card) 60'	Stadium: Weser-Stadion; Attendance: 0 Referee: Robert Schröder

18 December 2020 13	Union Berlin	2–1	Borussia Dortmund	Berlin
20:30 CET (UTC+1)	Awoniyi 57'; Bülter (yellow card) 62'; Friedrich 78'	Report	Moukoko 60'; Witsel (yellow card) 67'	Stadium: Stadion An der Alten Försterei; Attendance: 0 Referee: Harm Osmers

3 January 2021 14	Borussia Dortmund	2–0	VfL Wolfsburg	Dortmund
15:30 CET (UTC+1)	Hummels (yellow card) 25'; Delaney (yellow card) 40'; Akanji 66'; Haaland (yellow card) 80'; Sancho 90+1'	Report	Steffen (yellow card) 38'	Stadium: Signal Iduna Park; Attendance: 0 Referee: Manuel Gräfe

9 January 2021 15	RB Leipzig	1–3	Borussia Dortmund	Leipzig
18:30 CET (UTC+1)	Sørloth 90'	Report	Delaney (yellow card) 32'; Sancho 55'; Haaland 71', 84'; Akanji (yellow card) 73'	Stadium: Red Bull Arena; Attendance: 0 Referee: Daniel Siebert

16 January 2021 16	Borussia Dortmund	1–1	Mainz 05	Dortmund
15:30 CET (UTC+1)	Can (yellow card) 68'; Meunier 73'; Reus (penalty missed) 76'	Report	Mwene (yellow card) 40'; Hack (yellow card) 47'; Öztunalı 57'	Stadium: Signal Iduna Park; Attendance: 0 Referee: Sven Jablonski

19 January 2021 17	Bayer Leverkusen	2–1	Borussia Dortmund	Leverkusen
20:30 CET (UTC+1)	Diaby 14', (yellow card) 78'; Bailey (yellow card) 73'; Wirtz 80'	Report	Brandt 67'; Hummels (yellow card) 90+1'; Delaney (yellow card) 90+3'	Stadium: BayArena; Attendance: 0 Referee: Felix Zwayer

22 January 2021 18	Borussia Mönchengladbach	4–2	Borussia Dortmund	Mönchengladbach
20:30 CET (UTC+1)	Elvedi 11', 32'; Bensebaini 49'; Thuram 78'; Kramer (yellow card) 90'	Report	Haaland 22', 28'	Stadium: Borussia-Park; Attendance: 0 Referee: Manuel Gräfe

30 January 2021 19	Borussia Dortmund	3–1	FC Augsburg	Dortmund
15:30 CET (UTC+1)	Haaland (penalty missed) 21'; Delaney 26'; Sancho 63'; Uduokhai 75' (o.g.)	Report	Hahn 10'; Iago (yellow card) 20'	Stadium: Signal Iduna Park; Attendance: 0 Referee: Patrick Ittrich

6 February 2021 20	SC Freiburg	2–1	Borussia Dortmund	Freiburg
15:30 CET (UTC+1)	Jeong 49'; Schmid 52'; Haberer (yellow card) 90+4'	Report	Moukoko 76'; Bellingham (yellow card) 78'; Akanji (yellow card) 90+2'	Stadium: Schwarzwald-Stadion; Attendance: 0 Referee: Felix Brych

13 February 2021 21	Borussia Dortmund	2–2	1899 Hoffenheim	Dortmund
15:30 CET (UTC+1)	Delaney (yellow card) 21'; Sancho 24'; Akanji (yellow card) 67'; Haaland 81'; Dahoud (yellow card) 81'	Report	Rudy (yellow card) 27'; Dabbur 31', (yellow card) 85'; Bebou 51'; Grillitsch (yellow card) 57'; Vogt (yellow card) 59'; Posch (yellow card) 60'; Samassékou (yellow card) 65'; Gaćinović (yellow card) 90+2'	Stadium: Signal Iduna Park; Attendance: 0 Referee: Bastian Dankert

20 February 2021 22	Schalke 04	0–4	Borussia Dortmund	Gelsenkirchen
18:30 CET (UTC+1)	Hoppe (yellow card) 14'; Kolašinac (yellow card) 66'	Report	Sancho 42'; Haaland 45', 79'; Guerreiro 60'; Bellingham (yellow card) 63'; Dahoud (yellow card) 64'	Stadium: Veltins-Arena; Attendance: 0 Referee: Daniel Siebert

27 February 2021 23	Borussia Dortmund	3–0	Arminia Bielefeld	Dortmund
15:30 CET (UTC+1)	Dahoud 48'; Sancho 58' (pen.); Reinier 81'	Report	Pieper (yellow card) 57'; Kunze (yellow card) 72'; Prietl (yellow card) 83'	Stadium: Signal Iduna Park; Attendance: 0 Referee: Tobias Reichel

6 March 2021 24	Bayern Munich	4–2	Borussia Dortmund	Munich
18:30 CET (UTC+1)	Lewandowski 26', 44' (pen.), 90', (yellow card) 28'; Goretzka 88'	Report	Haaland 2', 9'; Meunier (yellow card) 29'	Stadium: Allianz Arena; Attendance: 0 Referee: Marco Fritz

13 March 2021 25	Borussia Dortmund	2–0	Hertha BSC	Dortmund
18:30 CET (UTC+1)	Schulz (yellow card) 23'; Brandt 54'; Moukoko 90+1'	Report	Zeefuik (yellow card) 59'; Darida (red card) 80'	Stadium: Signal Iduna Park; Attendance: 0 Referee: Martin Petersen

20 March 2021 26	1. FC Köln	2–2	Borussia Dortmund	Cologne
15:30 CET (UTC+1)	Duda 35' (pen.); Jakobs 65', (yellow card) 90+2'	Report	Haaland 3', 90'; Bellingham (yellow card) 34'	Stadium: RheinEnergieStadion; Attendance: 0 Referee: Daniel Siebert

3 April 2021 27	Borussia Dortmund	1–2	Eintracht Frankfurt	Dortmund
15:30 CEST (UTC+2)	Hummels 45'	Report	Schulz 11' (o.g.); Kostić (yellow card) 25'; Sow (yellow card) 33'; Rode (yellow card) 76'; Silva 87'	Stadium: Signal Iduna Park; Attendance: 0 Referee: Manuel Gräfe

10 April 2021 28	VfB Stuttgart	2–3	Borussia Dortmund	Stuttgart
18:30 CEST (UTC+2)	Kalajdžić 17'; Sosa (yellow card) 21'; Förster (yellow card) 28'; Kempf (yellow card) 50'; Didavi 78'; Anton (yellow card) 82'	Report	Hummels (yellow card) 31'; Bellingham 47'; Reus 52'; Knauff 80'; Hitz (yellow card) 90+2'	Stadium: Mercedes-Benz Arena; Attendance: 0 Referee: Robert Schröder

18 April 2021 29	Borussia Dortmund	4–1	Werder Bremen	Dortmund
15:30 CEST (UTC+2)	Reyna 29'; Haaland 34' (pen.), 38'; Dahoud (yellow card) 48'; Hummels 87'	Report	Rashica 14'; Friedl (yellow card) 60'; Veljković (yellow card) 66'; Groß (yellow card) 77'; Moisander (yellow card) 85'	Stadium: Signal Iduna Park; Attendance: 0 Referee: Bastian Dankert

21 April 2021 30	Borussia Dortmund	2–0	Union Berlin	Dortmund
20:30 CEST (UTC+2)	Haaland (penalty missed) 27'; Reus 27'; Bellingham (yellow card) 70'; Hummels (yellow card) 72'; Guerreiro 88'	Report	Knoche (yellow card) 48'	Stadium: Signal Iduna Park; Attendance: 0 Referee: Daniel Schlager

24 April 2021 31	VfL Wolfsburg	0–2	Borussia Dortmund	Wolfsburg
15:30 CEST (UTC+2)	Paulo Otávio (yellow card) 72'	Report	Haaland 12', 68'; Bellingham (yellow card) 13' (yellow-red card) 59'; Meunier (yellow card) 88'	Stadium: Volkswagen Arena; Attendance: 0 Referee: Tobias Stieler

8 May 2021 32	Borussia Dortmund	3–2	RB Leipzig	Dortmund
15:30 CEST (UTC+2)	Reus 7'; Sancho 51', 87'; Hummels (yellow card) 74'	Report	Klostermann 63'; Olmo 77'; Haidara (yellow card) 90+1'	Stadium: Signal Iduna Park; Attendance: 0 Referee: Daniel Siebert

16 May 2021 33	Mainz 05	1–3	Borussia Dortmund	Mainz
18:00 CEST (UTC+2)	Quaison 90+1' (pen.)	Report	Guerreiro 23'; Reus 42'; Brandt 80'	Stadium: Opel Arena; Attendance: 0 Referee: Harm Osmers

22 May 2021 34	Borussia Dortmund	3–1	Bayer Leverkusen	Dortmund
15:30 CEST (UTC+2)	Haaland 5', 84'; Reus 51'	Report	Bender 90' (pen.)	Stadium: Signal Iduna Park; Attendance: 0 Referee: Manuel Gräfe

=== DFB-Pokal ===
14 September 2020 First round	MSV Duisburg	0–5	Borussia Dortmund	Duisburg
20:45 CEST (UTC+2)	Karweina (yellow card) 25'; Volkmer (red card) 38'	Report	Sancho 14' (pen.); Bellingham (yellow card) 21', (goal) 30'; Witsel (yellow card) 26'; Hazard 39', (yellow card) 48'; Reyna 50'; Reus 58'	Stadium: Schauinsland-Reisen-Arena; Attendance: 300; Referee: Robert Kampka

22 December 2020 Second round	Eintracht Braunschweig	0–2	Borussia Dortmund	Braunschweig
20:00 CET (UTC+1)	Ben Balla (yellow card) 19'; Nikolaou (yellow card) 88'	Report	Hummels 12'; Bellingham (yellow card) 24'; Morey (yellow card) 44'; Sancho 90+2'	Stadium: Eintracht-Stadion; Attendance: 0 Referee: Benjamin Cortus

2 February 2021 Round of 16	Borussia Dortmund	3–2 (a.e.t.)	SC Paderborn	Dortmund
20:45 CET (UTC+1)	Can 6'; Sancho 16'; Delaney (yellow card) 77'; Haaland 95'; Dahoud (yellow card) 120+3'	Report	Srbeny (yellow card) 51'; Ingelsson (yellow card) 52'; Ananou (yellow card) 75'; Justvan 79'; Owusu 90+7' (pen.); Antwi-Adjei (yellow card) 104'	Stadium: Signal Iduna Park; Attendance: 0 Referee: Tobias Stieler

2 March 2021 Quarter-finals	Borussia Mönchengladbach	0–1	Borussia Dortmund	Mönchengladbach
20:45 CET (UTC+1)	Stindl (yellow card) 32'; Bensebaini (yellow card) 90+2'	Report	Dahoud (yellow card) 29' (yellow-red card) 90+2'; Reus (yellow card) 50'; Sancho 66'; Hitz (yellow card) 90+5'	Stadium: Borussia-Park; Attendance: 0 Referee: Sascha Stegemann

1 May 2021 Semi-finals	Borussia Dortmund	5–0	Holstein Kiel	Dortmund
20:30 CEST (UTC+2)	Reyna 16', 23'; Reus 26'; Hazard 32'; Bellingham 42'	Report	Hauptmann (yellow card) 37'; Lorenz (yellow card) 87'	Stadium: Signal Iduna Park; Attendance: 0 Referee: Christian Dingert

13 May 2021 Final	RB Leipzig	1–4	Borussia Dortmund	Berlin
20:45 CEST (UTC+2)	Upamecano (yellow card) 45+1'; Olmo 71', (yellow card) 81'	Report	Sancho 5', 45+1', (yellow card) 81'; Can (yellow card) 15'; Bellingham (yellow card) 25'; Haaland 28', 87'; Dahoud (yellow card) 50'; Hummels (yellow card) 90'	Stadium: Olympiastadion; Attendance: 0 Referee: Felix Brych

=== DFL-Supercup ===
30 September 2020 Final	Bayern Munich	3–2	Borussia Dortmund	Munich
20:30 CEST (UTC+2)	Tolisso 18'; Müller 32'; Hernandez (yellow card) 66'; Kimmich 82'	Report	Brandt 39'; Haaland 55'	Stadium: Allianz Arena; Attendance: 0 (Note: The match was played behind closed doors due to the COVID-19 pandemic in Germany.); Referee: Bibiana Steinhaus

=== UEFA Champions League ===
==== Group stage ====
The group stage draw was held on 1 October 2020.

Pos	Team	Pld	W	D	L	GF	GA	GD	Pts	Qualification	DOR	LAZ	BRU	ZEN
1	(Germany) Borussia Dortmund	6	4	1	1	12	5	+7	13	Advance to knockout phase	—	1–1	3–0	2–0
2	(Italy) Lazio	6	2	4	0	11	7	+4	10	Advance to knockout phase	3–1	—	2–2	3–1
3	(Belgium) Club Brugge	6	2	2	2	8	10	−2	8	Transfer to Europa League	0–3	1–1	—	3–0
4	(Russia) Zenit Saint Petersburg	6	0	1	5	4	13	−9	1		1–2	1–1	1–2	—

Source: UEFA
Rules for classification: Group stage tiebreakers

20 October 2020 1	Lazio (Italy)	3–1	(Germany) Borussia Dortmund	Rome, Italy
21:00 CEST (UTC+2)	Immobile 6'; Hitz 23' (o.g.); Luis Alberto (yellow card) 42'; Akpa Akpro 76'; Strakosha (yellow card) 84'	Report	Reyna (yellow card) 62'; Delaney (yellow card) 62'; Haaland 71'	Stadium: Stadio Olimpico; Attendance: 1,000; Referee: Clément Turpin (France)

28 October 2020 2	Borussia Dortmund (Germany)	2–0	(Russia) Zenit Saint Petersburg	Dortmund, Germany
21:00 CET (UTC+1)	Sancho 78' (pen.); Haaland 90+1'	Report	Kuzyayev (yellow card) 25'; Karavayev (yellow card) 78'	Stadium: Westfalenstadion; Attendance: 0 (Note: Due to the COVID-19 pandemic in Europe, the match was played behind closed doors.); Referee: Björn Kuipers (Netherlands)

4 November 2020 3	Club Brugge (Belgium)	0–3	(Germany) Borussia Dortmund	Bruges, Belgium
21:00 CET (UTC+1)		Report	Hazard 14'; Haaland 18', 32'	Stadium: Jan Breydel Stadium; Attendance: 0 Referee: Damir Skomina (Slovenia)

24 November 2020 4	Borussia Dortmund (Germany)	3–0	(Belgium) Club Brugge	Dortmund, Germany
21:00 CET (UTC+1)	Haaland 18', 60'; Sancho 45'	Report	Rits (yellow card) 71'	Stadium: Westfalenstadion; Attendance: 0 Referee: Ivan Kružliak (Slovakia)

2 December 2020 5	Borussia Dortmund (Germany)	1–1	(Italy) Lazio	Dortmund, Germany
21:00 CET (UTC+1)	Guerreiro 44'	Report	Immobile 67' (pen.)	Stadium: Westfalenstadion; Attendance: 0 Referee: Antonio Mateu Lahoz (Spain)

8 December 2020 6	Zenit Saint Petersburg (Russia)	1–2	(Germany) Borussia Dortmund	Saint Petersburg, Russia
18:55 CET (UTC+1)	Azmoun (yellow card) 10'; Driussi 16'	Report	Piszczek 68'; Witsel 79'	Stadium: Krestovsky Stadium; Attendance: 10,860; Referee: István Kovács (Romania)

==== Knockout phase ====
===== Round of 16 =====
The draw for the round of 16 was held on 14 December 2020.

17 February 2021 First leg	Sevilla (Spain)	2–3	(Germany) Borussia Dortmund	Seville, Spain
21:00 CET (UTC+1)	Suso 7'; De Jong 84'; Óscar (yellow card) 88'	Report	Dahoud 19'; Haaland 27', 43', (yellow card) 90+1'; Hummels (yellow card) 73'	Stadium: Ramón Sánchez Pizjuán; Attendance: 0 Referee: Danny Makkelie (Netherlands)

9 March 2021 Second leg	Borussia Dortmund (Germany)	2–2 (5–4 agg.)	(Spain) Sevilla	Dortmund, Germany
21:00 CET (UTC+1)	Morey (yellow card) 20'; Haaland 35', 54' (pen.), (yellow card) 55'; Can (yellow card) 67'	Report	Acuña (yellow card) 40'; Koundé (yellow card) 51'; Jordán (yellow card) 55'; En-Nesyri 69' (pen.), 90+6'; Óscar (yellow card) 71'; Fernando (yellow card) 76'; Diego Carlos (yellow card) 77'	Stadium: Westfalenstadion; Attendance: 0 Referee: Cüneyt Çakır (Turkey)

===== Quarter-finals =====
The draw for the quarter-finals was held on 19 March 2021.

6 April 2021 First leg	Manchester City (England)	2–1	(Germany) Borussia Dortmund	Manchester, England
20:00 BST (UTC+1)	De Bruyne 19'; Foden 90'	Report	Can (yellow card) 30'; Bellingham (yellow card) 37'; Reus 84'	Stadium: City of Manchester Stadium; Attendance: 0 Referee: Ovidiu Hațegan (Romania)

14 April 2021 Second leg	Borussia Dortmund (Germany)	1–2 (2–4 agg.)	(England) Manchester City	Dortmund, Germany
21:00 CEST (UTC+2)	Bellingham 15', (yellow card) 39'	Report	Mahrez 55' (pen.); Foden 75'	Stadium: Westfalenstadion; Attendance: 0 Referee: Carlos del Cerro Grande (Spain)

== Statistics ==
=== Appearances and goals ===
No.	Pos	Nat	Player	Total		Bundesliga		DFB-Pokal		Champions League		DFL-Supercup	
No.	Pos	Nat	Player	Apps	Goals	Apps	Goals	Apps	Goals	Apps	Goals	Apps	Goals
Goalkeepers
1	GK	(Switzerland) SUI	Roman Bürki	24	0	18+1	0	1	0	4	0	0	0
25	GK	(Germany) GER	Luca Unbehaun	0	0	0	0	0	0	0	0	0	0
35	GK	(Switzerland) SUI	Marwin Hitz	28	0	16	0	5	0	6	0	1	0
40	GK	(Germany) GER	Stefan Drljača	0	0	0	0	0	0	0	0	0	0
Defenders
2	DF	(Spain) ESP	Mateu Morey	24	0	10+3	0	3+1	0	5+2	0	0	0
5	DF	(France) FRA	Dan-Axel Zagadou	13	0	3+6	0	1+1	0	0+2	0	0	0
13	DF	(Portugal) POR	Raphaël Guerreiro	40	6	25+2	5	4+1	0	8	1	0	0
14	DF	(Germany) GER	Nico Schulz	18	0	5+7	0	1+1	0	2+1	0	0+1	0
15	DF	(Germany) GER	Mats Hummels	48	6	32+1	5	5	1	9	0	1	0
16	DF	(Switzerland) SUI	Manuel Akanji	41	2	26+2	2	4+1	0	7	0	1	0
24	DF	(Belgium) BEL	Thomas Meunier	33	1	17+4	1	1+3	0	4+3	0	1	0
26	DF	(Poland) POL	Łukasz Piszczek	19	1	5+6	0	3+1	0	3	1	0+1	0
29	DF	(Germany) GER	Marcel Schmelzer	0	0	0	0	0	0	0	0	0	0
30	DF	(Germany) GER	Felix Passlack	14	1	3+4	1	0+1	0	1+4	0	1	0
Midfielders
6	MF	(Denmark) DEN	Thomas Delaney	34	1	14+6	1	3+3	0	5+2	0	1	0
7	MF	(England) ENG	Jadon Sancho	38	16	24+2	8	6	6	4+2	2	0	0
8	MF	(Germany) GER	Mahmoud Dahoud	31	2	15+6	1	2+1	0	6	1	1	0
10	MF	(Belgium) BEL	Thorgan Hazard	28	4	8+8	1	2+3	2	5+2	1	0	0
19	MF	(Germany) GER	Julian Brandt	45	4	17+14	3	3+2	0	2+6	0	1	1
20	MF	(Brazil) BRA	Reinier	19	1	1+13	1	0+2	0	0+2	0	0+1	0
22	MF	(England) ENG	Jude Bellingham	46	4	19+10	1	6	2	8+2	1	0+1	0
23	MF	(Germany) GER	Emre Can	40	2	23+5	1	5	1	5+1	0	1	0
28	MF	(Belgium) BEL	Axel Witsel	22	1	13+2	0	1+1	0	4+1	1	0	0
32	MF	(United States) USA	Giovanni Reyna	46	7	23+9	4	3+2	3	4+4	0	0+1	0
37	MF	(Germany) GER	Tobias Raschl	0	0	0	0	0	0	0	0	0	0
39	MF	(Germany) GER	Dominik Wanner	0	0	0	0	0	0	0	0	0	0
Forwards
9	FW	(Norway) NOR	Erling Haaland	41	41	27+1	27	4	3	8	10	1	1
11	FW	(Germany) GER	Marco Reus	49	11	27+5	8	3+3	2	8+2	1	1	0
18	FW	(Germany) GER	Youssoufa Moukoko	15	3	2+12	3	0	0	0+1	0	0	0
27	FW	(Germany) GER	Steffen Tigges	8	0	0+6	0	1	0	0+1	0	0	0
36	FW	(Germany) GER	Ansgar Knauff	7	1	0+4	1	0	0	2+1	0	0	0
Players transferred out during the season

Last updated: 22 May 2021
Source: Competitions

=== Goalscorers ===
Rank	Pos.	No.	Nat.	Name	Bundesliga	DFB-Pokal	Champions League	DFL-Supercup	Total
1	FW	9	(Norway)	Erling Haaland	27	3	10	1	41
2	MF	7	(England)	Jadon Sancho	8	6	2	0	16
3	FW	11	(Germany)	Marco Reus	8	2	1	0	11
4	MF	32	(United States)	Giovanni Reyna	4	3	0	0	7
5	DF	13	(Portugal)	Raphaël Guerreiro	5	0	1	0	6
5	DF	15	(Germany)	Mats Hummels	5	1	0	0	6
7	MF	10	(Belgium)	Thorgan Hazard	1	2	1	0	4
7	MF	19	(Germany)	Julian Brandt	3	0	0	1	4
7	MF	22	(England)	Jude Bellingham	1	2	1	0	4
10	FW	18	(Germany)	Youssoufa Moukoko	3	0	0	0	3
11	MF	8	(Germany)	Mahmoud Dahoud	1	0	1	0	2
11	DF	16	(Switzerland)	Manuel Akanji	2	0	0	0	2
11	MF	23	(Germany)	Emre Can	1	1	0	0	2
14	MF	6	(Denmark)	Thomas Delaney	1	0	0	0	1
14	MF	20	(Brazil)	Reinier	1	0	0	0	1
14	DF	24	(Belgium)	Thomas Meunier	1	0	0	0	1
14	DF	26	(Poland)	Łukasz Piszczek	0	0	1	0	1
14	MF	28	(Belgium)	Axel Witsel	0	0	1	0	1
14	DF	30	(Germany)	Felix Passlack	1	0	0	0	1
14	FW	36	(Germany)	Ansgar Knauff	1	0	0	0	1
Own goals					1	0	0	0	1
Totals					75	20	19	2	116

Last updated: 22 May 2021
