= Thorgan Hazard =

Belgian footballer (born 1993)

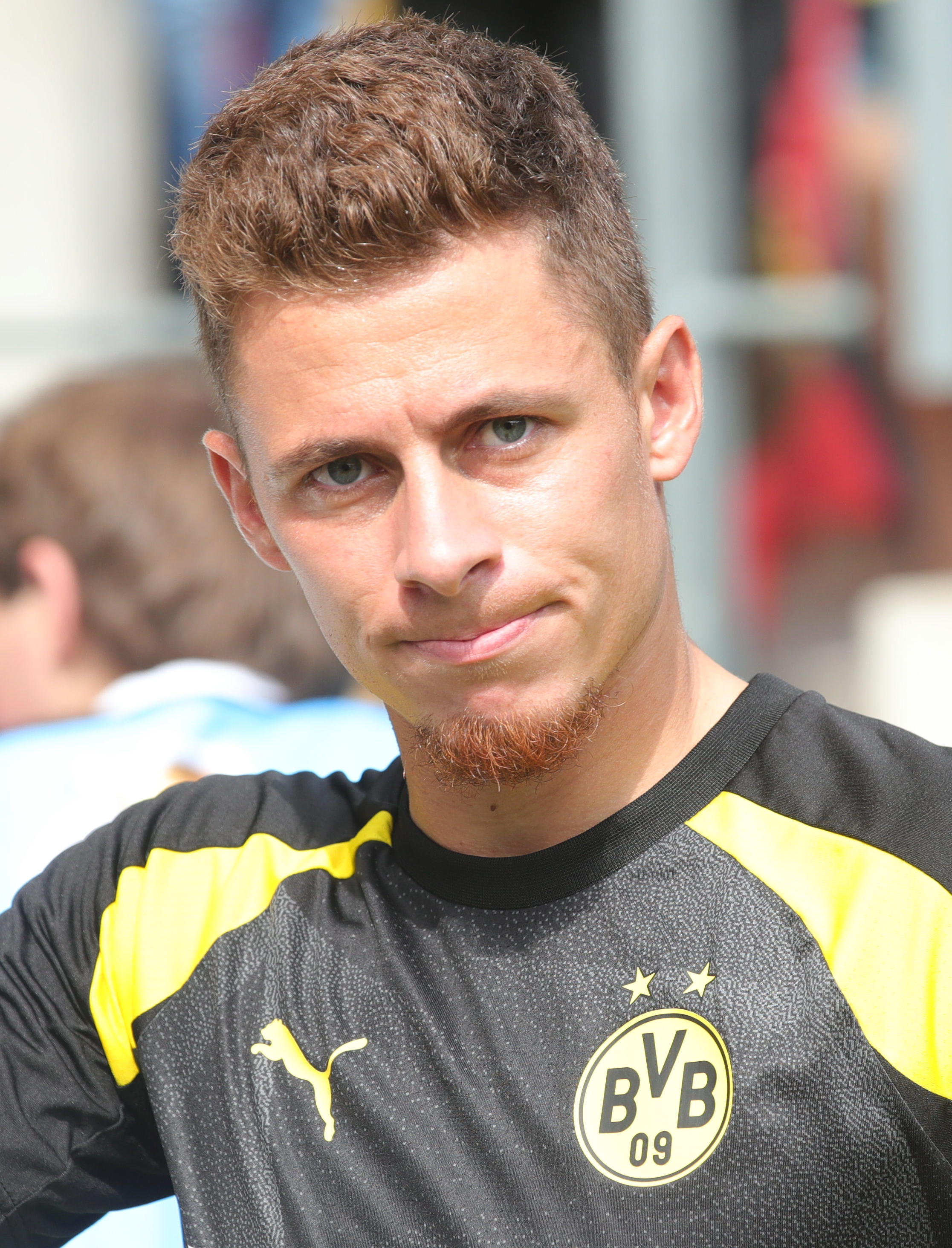
- Hazard with Borussia Dortmund in 2023

Personal information
- Full name: Thorgan Ganael Francis Hazard
- Date of birth: 29 March 1993 (age 33)
- Place of birth: La Louvière, Belgium
- Height: 1.75 m (5 ft 9 in)
- Positions: Attacking midfielder; winger

Team information
- Current team: Lens
- Number: 9

Youth career
- 1998–2003: Royal Stade Brainois
- 2003–2007: AFC Tubize
- 2007–2011: Lens

Senior career*
Years	Team	Apps	(Gls)
2011–2012	Lens	14	(0)
2012–2015	Chelsea	0	(0)
2012–2014	→ Zulte Waregem (loan)	73	(18)
2014–2015	→ Borussia Mönchengladbach (loan)	28	(1)
2015–2019	Borussia Mönchengladbach	119	(30)
2019–2023	Borussia Dortmund	87	(12)
2023	→ PSV (loan)	9	(1)
2023–2026	Anderlecht	78	(19)
2026–	Lens	7	(1)

International career
2008	Belgium U15	3	(0)
2008–2009	Belgium U16	12	(4)
2008–2010	Belgium U17	12	(1)
2010	Belgium U18	1	(0)
2010–2012	Belgium U19	23	(10)
2012–2014	Belgium U21	10	(1)
2013–2022	Belgium	47	(9)
Medal record
Men's football
Representing Belgium
FIFA World Cup
Third place	2018 Russia
- * Club domestic league appearances and goals as of 30 October 2026

Thorgan Ganael Francis Hazard (born 29 March 1993) is a Belgian professional footballer who plays as an attacking midfielder or winger for Ligue 1 club Lens.

Hazard began his professional career at Lens in Ligue 1, and moved to Chelsea in 2012 shortly after they had signed his older brother, Eden. He never played a competitive match for Chelsea, being loaned for two years to Zulte Waregem, where he was awarded the Belgian Golden Shoe in January 2014, for the best footballer in the Belgian Pro League, and the prize for best professional football player in May 2014. He joined Borussia Mönchengladbach in 2014, initially on loan, and made over 100 appearances for the club before moving to Borussia Dortmund in 2019. In January 2023, Hazard joined Eredivisie club PSV Eindhoven on loan. In September 2023, Hazard joined Anderlecht permanently, returning to Belgium.

Having previously played at every level in the Belgian national youth team system, he was handed his first senior international cap against the United States in May 2013. He was part of the Belgian squad that came third at the 2018 FIFA World Cup alongside his older brother Eden, whom he also played alongside at the 2022 FIFA World Cup. His younger brothers, Kylian and Ethan, are also footballers.

== Early and personal life ==
Hazard grew up in Braine-le-Comte, a small town in the Wallonia region, but he was born in La Louvière. His first name was inspired by the Belgian comic strip Thorgal and he grew up in a family where football was popular. His mother Carine and father Thierry were both footballers in Belgium. His father spent most of his career playing at semi-professional level with Louviéroise in the Belgian Second Division, playing mainly as a defensive midfielder. His mother played as a striker in the Belgian Women's First Division and stopped playing when she was three months pregnant with his older brother Eden. After playing football, both his parents became physical education teachers. Thierry retired from his position in 2009 to devote more time to his children.

Hazard has three other siblings. His older brother, Eden, played for Lens' biggest rivals Lille, subsequently finding his best form when playing for Chelsea and last played for Real Madrid in Spain before retiring in 2023. Hazard's other younger brothers are Kylian and Ethan. In 2013, Kylian joined White Star Bruxelles, and on 29 August 2017, he signed to join Chelsea's development team, however is currently playing for RFC Liège. Like all three of his brothers, Ethan came up through the youth academy of A.F.C. Tubize and its successor Royale Union Tubize-Braine, and currently plays for FC Ganshoren. Hazard and his three brothers were raised in a comfortable environment with their parents ensuring they had whatever they needed to excel. The family lived "no more than three meters" from a football training ground and the brothers often ventured onto a training pitch through a small hole in order to hone and develop their skills.

== Club career ==
=== Lens ===
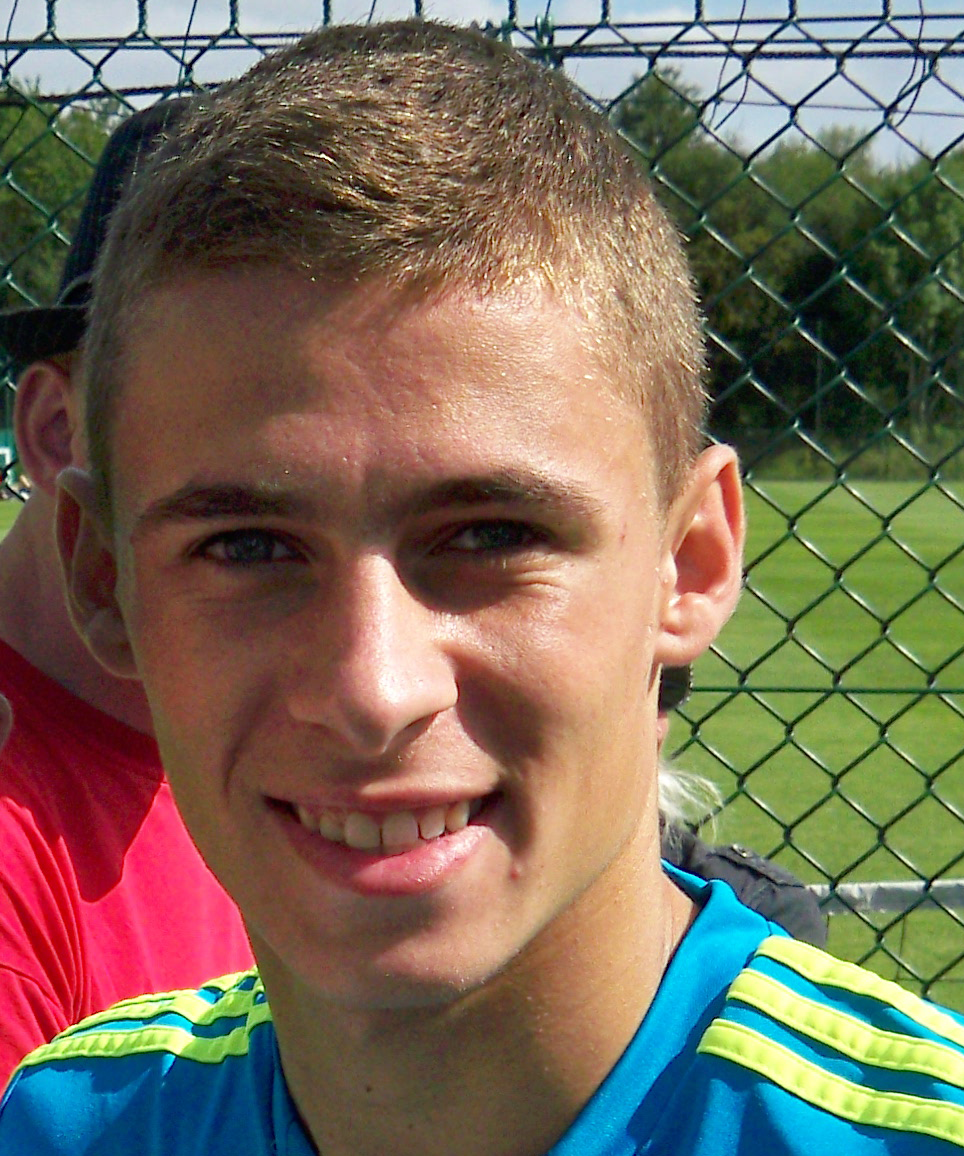
Hazard with Lens in 2011

Hazard began his football career playing for hometown club Royal Stade Brainois at age five. After spending five years at the club, Thorgan followed his brother Eden to Tubize. At age 14, he was discovered by French club Lens while playing for Tubize in a local tournament. Similar to his brother's move to Lille, his parents accepted an offer from Lens with the hope that the training facilities in France would be better, here he met fellow Belgium player and future Chelsea teammate Charly Musonda. Hazard's father later admitted Eden was much better than Thorgan, and that joining clubs in the North of France was the best solution, stating, "They remained so close to home and, at the same time, they integrated at structures where they could grow, because in Belgium, unfortunately, it's a little empty for the training of youth." While in the club's youth academy, Hazard played for the Lens under-16 team, alongside players such as Geoffrey Kondogbia and Raphaël Varane, that won the 2008–09 edition of the Championnat National des 16 ans 44.

On 7 April 2010, Hazard signed his first professional contract after agreeing to a three-year deal until June 2013. Ahead of the 2010–11 season, Hazard trained with the senior team during the pre-season. On his pre-season debut, he scored a goal in a 1–1 draw with Belgian club Roeselare. However, Hazard began the season with the club's Championnat de France amateur team in the fourth division. He made his amateur debut on 8 August 2010, appearing as a substitute in a 2–0 victory over Drancy. After spending most of the season playing concurrently with the reserve team in the CFA and with the under-19 team in the Coupe Gambardella, on 9 May 2011, Hazard was named to the senior team for the first time on 11 May in a Ligue 1 match against Bordeaux. However, Hazard did not feature in the match and finished the 2010–11 campaign with no senior team appearances.

Ahead of the 2011–12 season, Hazard was promoted to the senior team permanently and assigned the number 22 shirt. He made his professional debut in Lens' opening league match of the season against Reims, appearing as a second-half substitute in a 2–0 defeat. He played 14 league games that season.

=== Chelsea ===
On 24 July 2012, Chelsea confirmed on its website the club had agreed terms with Lens for the transfer of Hazard, shortly after they announced the signing of his brother Eden from Lille. He made his debut on 17 August 2012 in an Under-21 Premier League match, a 0–0 home draw against Manchester City in what was to be his only appearance for Chelsea before leaving the club.

=== Zulte Waregem ===
On 30 August 2012, Hazard was sent on a season-long loan move to Belgian Pro League club Zulte Waregem. The move was set up to allow him first-team experience rather than be developed slowly by Chelsea.

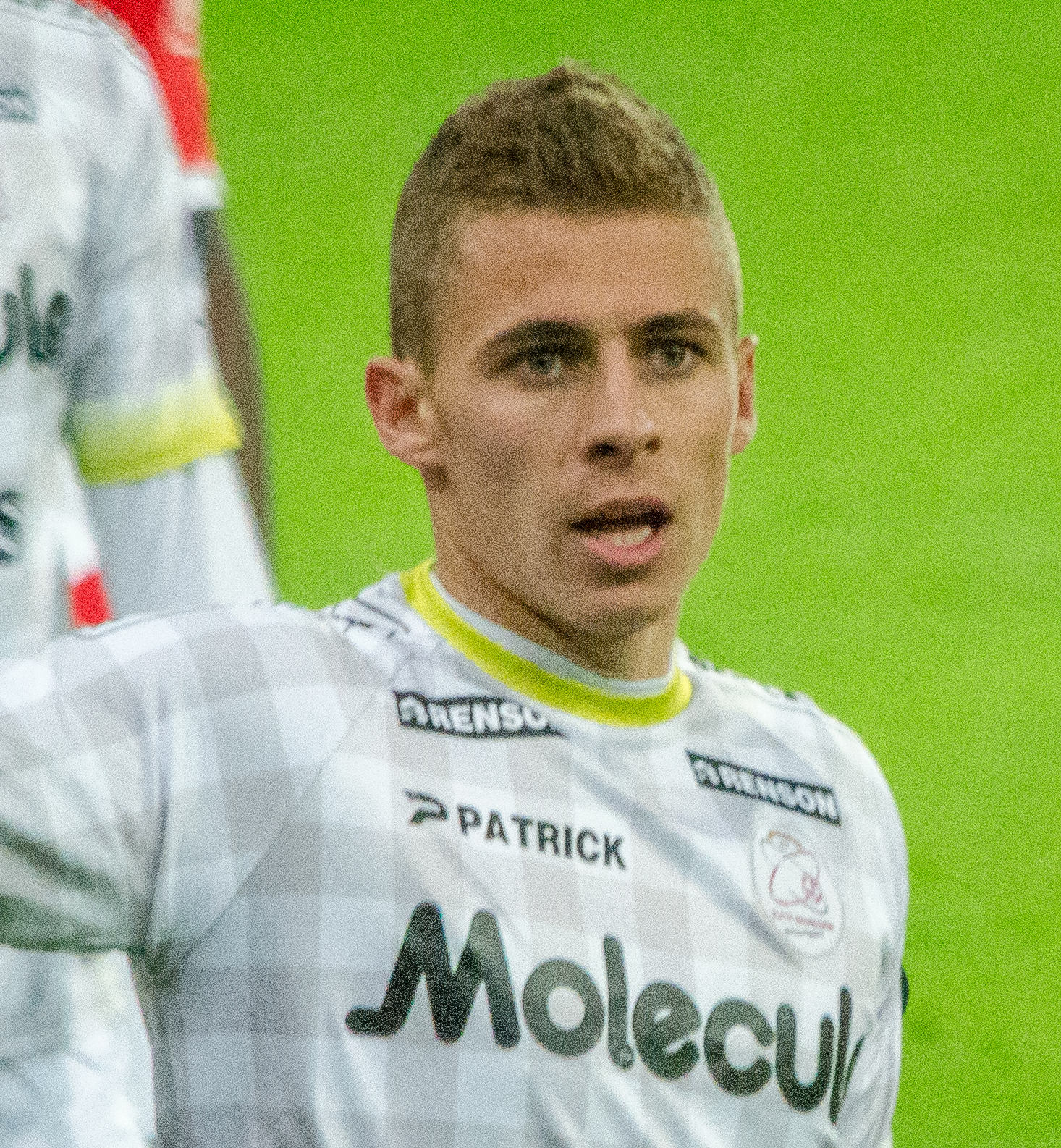
Hazard playing for Zulte Waregem in 2014

He made his debut on 15 September 2012 in a 1–0 away win against OH Leuven. Hazard scored his first goal on 31 October in a 4–1 home win against Charleroi. On 16 May 2013, Hazard put in an impressive shift as he scored the game's opening goal from the penalty spot before providing two assists in a 5–2 defeat of Club Brugge at the Regenboogstadion in Waregem.

On 15 July 2013, Chelsea and Waregem agreed for Hazard to be loaned back for another year until the end of the 2013–14 season. Hazard scored a free-kick and assisted a goal as Zulte won their season opener against Lierse on 27 July.

On 2 August, the Belgian club announced Hazard would be replacing experienced defender Davy De fauw as club captain, which was received with much anger from a section of the club's supporters. This led to Hazard handing the captain's armband back, less than 24 hours after receiving it. After the incident, it was rumoured the move to make Thorgan the club captain was one of the conditions in the loan deal imposed by Chelsea.

On 28 November 2013, Hazard scored against Wigan Athletic in a 2–1 win in the UEFA Europa League group stage win away at the DW Stadium. He was voted as Zulte's player of the season, and scored 17 goals in 53 matches across all competitions. Hazard also won the Belgian Player of the Year Award.

=== Borussia Mönchengladbach ===
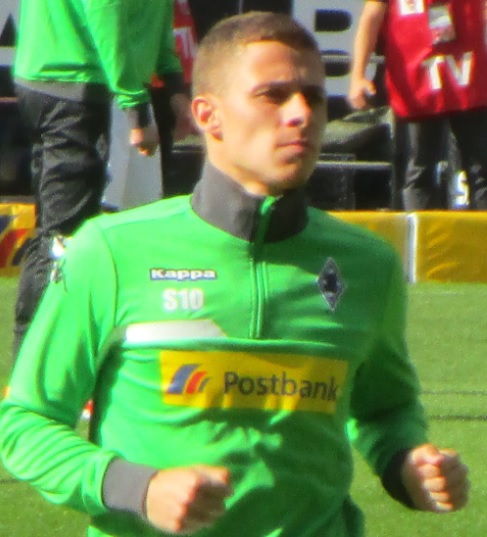
Hazard training for Mönchengladbach in 2015

On 5 July 2014, Hazard was loaned to German club Borussia Mönchengladbach for the 2014–15 season. During his loan, Hazard wore the number 26. In the 3–1 win against FC 08 Homburg in the DFB-Pokal 16 August 2014, Hazard made his debut, coming on in the 78th minute as a substitute for Branimir Hrgota. He then made his Bundesliga debut on 24 August 2014 in a 1–1 draw against VfB Stuttgart, coming off the bench in the 67th minute.

Hazard scored twice in Gladbach's 7–0 win over FK Sarajevo in the UEFA Europa League play-offs on 28 August 2014, including a curling free-kick from 35 yards out. On 24 September 2014, Hazard made his first start for Borussia Mönchengladbach in the Bundesliga, against Hamburger SV, playing 71 minutes before being substituted for Fabian Johnson in a 1–0 win. On 6 December 2014, Hazard started against Hertha BSC, only his second start in the Bundesliga. He played the full 90 minutes and assisted Tony Jantschke for the first goal of the match in the opening ten minutes, as well as scoring the winning goal in the 83rd minute, his first of the Bundesliga season. The match ended in a 3–2 win, breaking the club's four-match winless streak.

On 23 February 2015, Hazard agreed to sign permanently for Borussia Monchengladbach, affective from 1 July. He joined on a five-year contract, thus lasting until June 2020, a buy-back agreement with Chelsea was also included. The contract consists of four years, along with one year optional. The transfer fee was reported as €8 million (£5.9 million), 16 times as much as Chelsea paid for him. During an interview about his move becoming permanent in the summer, Hazard confirmed his deal does contain a buy-back clause and that he still dreams of returning to Stamford Bridge in the future. In his interview, he said, "I am focusing on excelling at Borussia Monchengladbach, but I still hope to play for Chelsea one day."

On 8 August 2015, in his first game after his transfer, Hazard scored in a 4–1 win at FC St. Pauli in the first round of the DFB-Pokal. Following the resignation of manager Lucien Favre, who lost the first five matches of the Bundesliga, and André Schubert's appointment, he was unable to find a place in the starting lineup. Hazard made his first start under Schubert on 20 December against Darmstadt 98, eventually earning preference from Schubert over Ibrahima Traoré on the right side. Hazard finished the season with four goals, two coming in a match against Hertha BSC on 3 April 2016 in a 5–0 win.

Looking to improve his playing time and goalscoring heading into the year, Hazard scored his first ever hat-trick in a 6–1 victory over Swiss club Young Boys in the second leg of the UEFA Champions League play-off round on 24 August 2016. Mönchengladbach set a record with a 9–2 aggregate scoreline, the largest ever margin of victory in a play-off tie. On 17 September, Hazard and teammate Raffael both scored first-half braces against Werder Bremen in a Bundesliga match.

With rumours that Chelsea were looking to exercise their buy-back clause on Hazard, and that the clause expired at the end of 2016, club sport director Max Eberl claimed Chelsea did not actually have an explicit buy-back clause in Hazard's contract. Hazard, addressing these rumours, said, "I signed a contract here, because I want to play here." On 28 September, Hazard scored his first UEFA Champions League goal, opening the scoring against Barcelona at Borussia-Park before the visitors went on to win 1–2.

On 25 November 2017, he scored from the penalty spot to help his side defeat the Bundesliga record champions Bayern Munich 2–1. Hazard also scored twice in a 2–1 victory against Hertha BSC, and ended the season with eleven goals and six assists.

On 19 August 2018, Hazard, Alassane Pléa and Raffael each scored hat-tricks in an 11–1 win at fifth-tier BSC Hastedt in the first round of the cup.

=== Borussia Dortmund ===
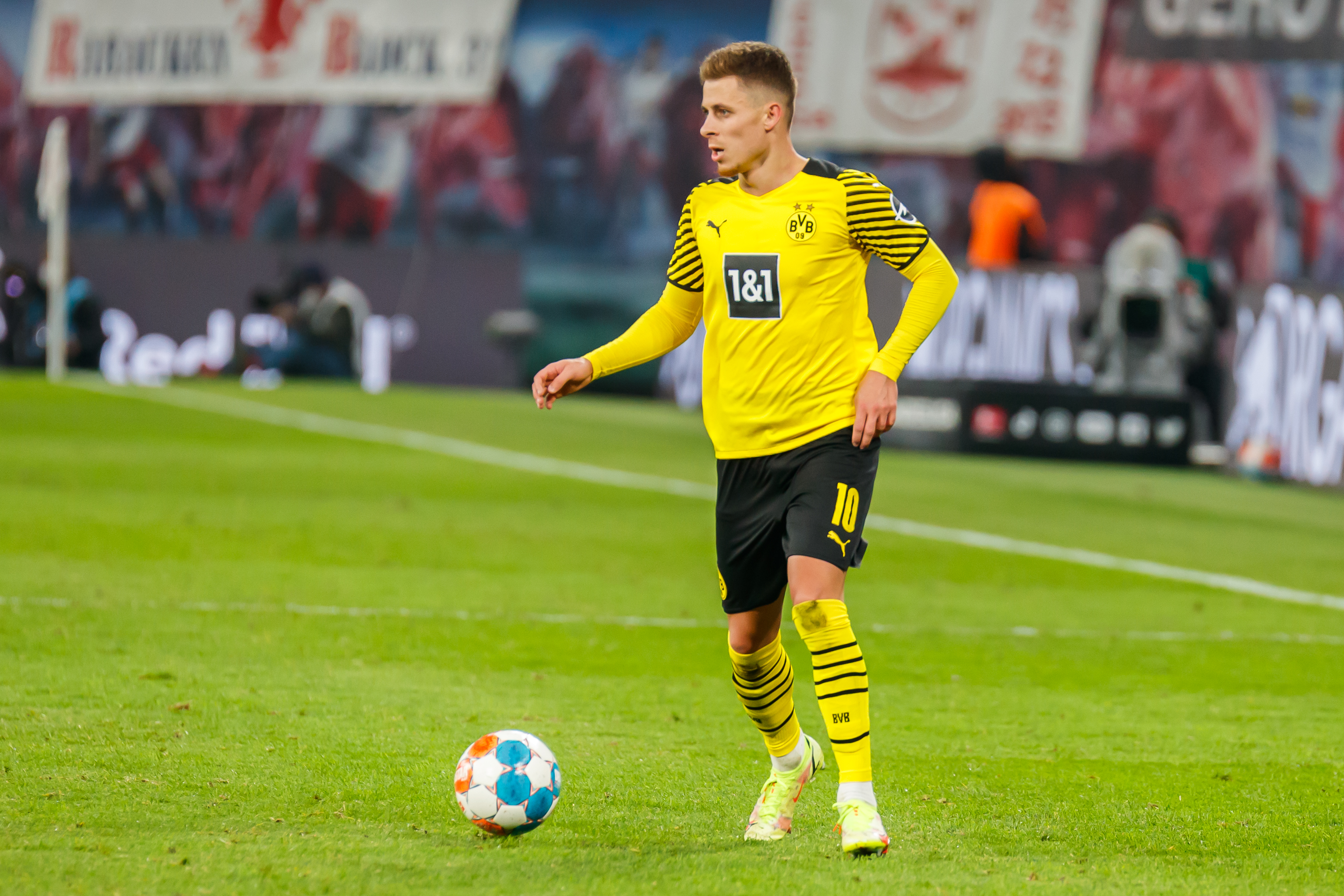
Hazard in action for Borussia Dortmund against RB Leipzig in 2021

On 22 May 2019, Hazard joined fellow Bundesliga side Borussia Dortmund on a five-year contract for a reported fee of €25.5 million. He joined the club at the same time as new teammate Julian Brandt, who arrived from Bayer Leverkusen. He made his Bundesliga debut for the club in a 5–1 win over FC Augsburg on 17 August. On 2 November, he scored his first goal for Dortmund in a 3–0 win against VfL Wolfsburg.

He was part of the squad that won the DFB-Pokal in the 2020–21 season, when Dortmund defeated RB Leipzig 4–1 in the final on 23 May 2021.

==== Loan to PSV ====
On 31 January 2023, Hazard joined Eredivisie club PSV on loan until the end of the season. He scored on his debut in a 2–2 draw against Feyenoord. During his spell in Eindhoven, Hazard was used primarily as an impact substitute, providing additional creativity on the left flank. His performances were generally well received, with local media noting his willingness to take on defenders and his improved match sharpness. Although he did not become a regular starter, he contributed valuable depth to PSV's attacking options during their push for domestic honours.

=== Anderlecht ===
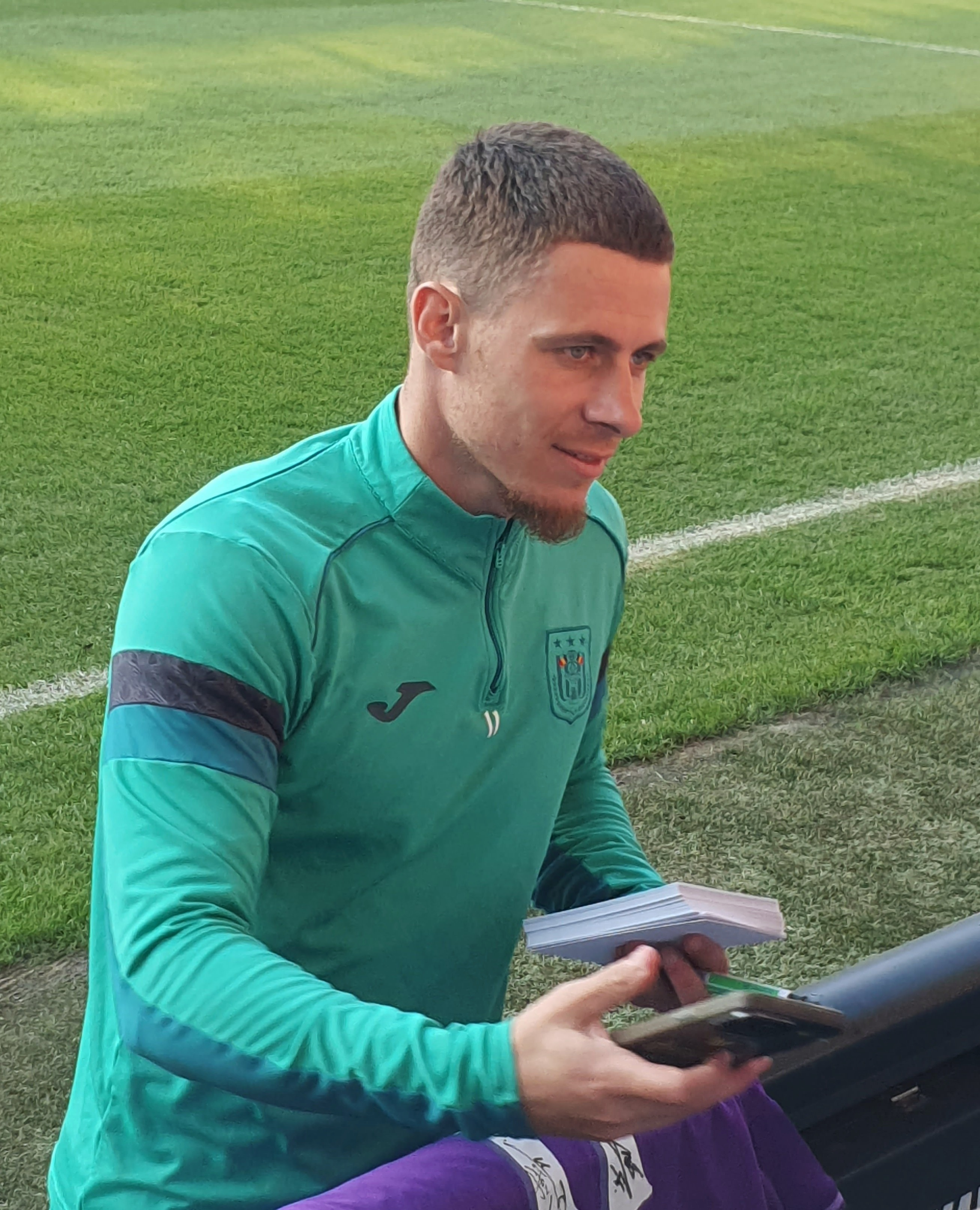
Hazard at a fan day of Anderlecht in 2025

On 6 September 2023, Hazard returned to Belgium and joined Belgian Pro League club Anderlecht on a three-year contract, for a reported fee of €4 million. On 28 January 2024, He scored his first goal for the club in a Pro League match against Royale Union Saint-Gilloise, where he scored the equaliser for Anderlecht in the last minutes of the game, which ended in a 2–2 draw. Hazard played an integral role in Anderlecht's 2023–24 title ambitions, adding experience to manager Brian Riemer’s team. This meant Anderlecht had dealt with a significant inconvenience to their title ambitions on 14 April 2024, when Hazard tore his anterior cruciate ligament (ACL) during a play-off match against then-league leaders Union Saint-Gilloise. In that same game, Hazard’s substitute Francis Amuzu scored a late winner. But Anderlecht missed out on the title, with many believing Hazard’s injury played an important part in that.

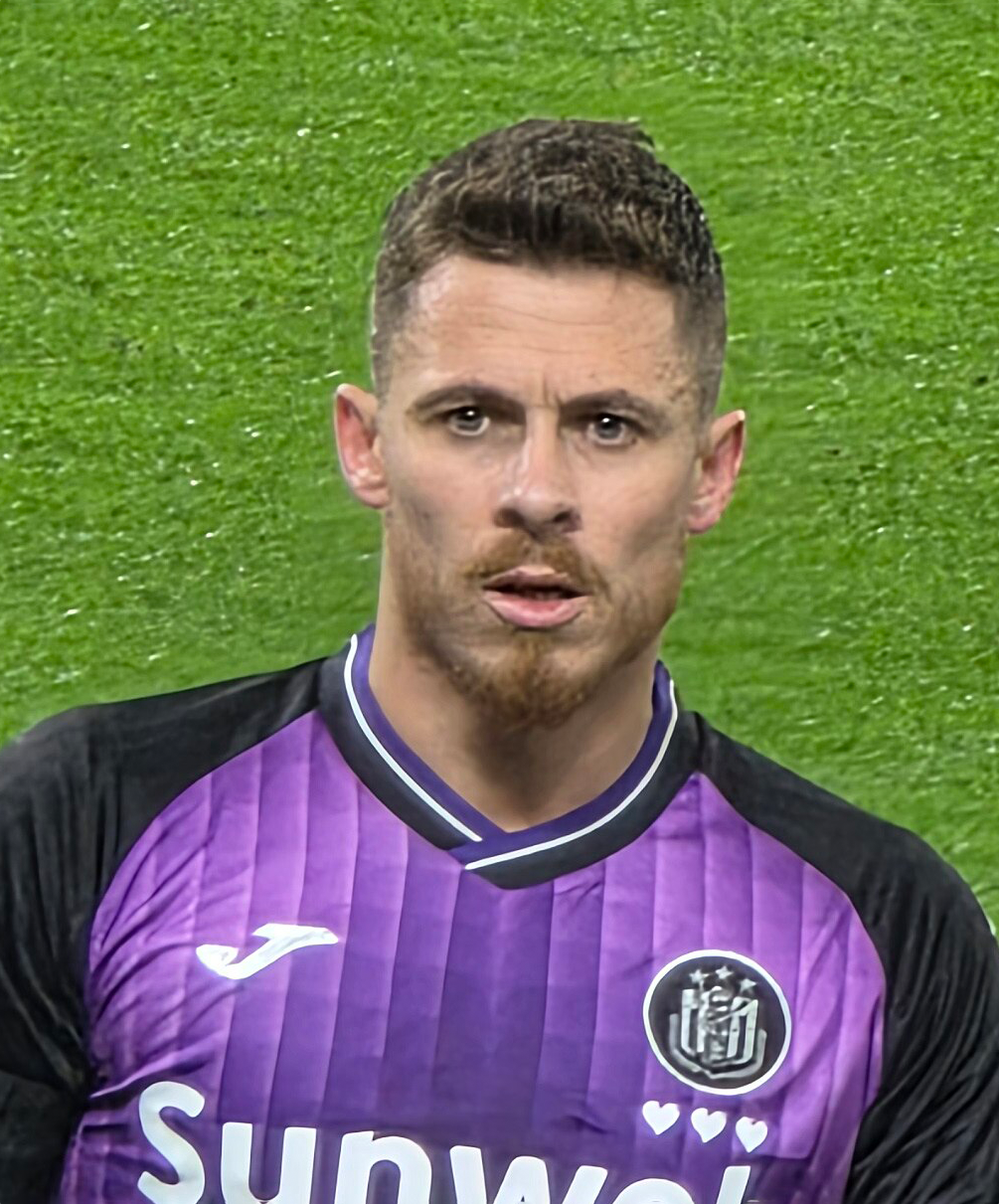
Hazard playing for Anderlecht in 2025

On 27 December 2024, Hazard made his return after eight months against FC Dender, coming on as a substitute for Yari Verschaeren. On 19 January 2025, Hazard returned to the starting XI after 280 days in a Belgian Pro League game against KV Kortrijk. The game ended 2–0 in favour of Anderlecht, with Hazard scoring the opener from a direct free kick. On 2 March, in the Belgian Clásico against Standard de Liège, Hazard scored a curling shot from outside the box into the top right corner, putting his team 1–0 up at Sclessin. Anderlecht won the game 2–0, securing their qualification for the Pro League champions’ play-offs.

=== Return to Lens ===
On 14 July 2026, Hazard returned to boyhood club Lens after nearly 14 years of absence, signing a two-year contract.

== International career ==
=== Youth ===
Hazard is a Belgian youth international and has represented his nation at under-16, under-17, and under-18 level. With the under-16 team, Hazard was a regular participant. He made his debut on 16 September 2008 in a 5–0 defeat to Germany in a tournament in Hassloch. In the team's next match in the tournament, against Macedonia, Hazard scored a goal in a 3–0 victory. For the rest of the under-16 campaign, he scored goals in matches against Malta and Poland. Hazard also played with the team at the 2009 edition of the Aegean Cup in Turkey. He featured in all three matches as Belgium crashed out in the group stage portion of the competition.

Due to his increased participation with Lens domestically, Hazard primarily played in competitive matches with the under-17 team under coach Bob Browaeys. In August 2009, he played with the team in the Toto Cup, a yearly international youth tournament held in Austria. In the first qualifying round for the 2009 UEFA European Under-17 Championship, Hazard scored his only goal with the team in a 1–1 draw with Montenegro. He was subsequently called up to the team in March 2010 for Elite Round qualification matches that were played in Northern Ireland. Hazard played in all three matches as Belgium failed to earn qualification to the tournament.

Hazard appeared in only one match with the under-18 team before bypassing the age level to represent the under-19 team ahead of the 2011 UEFA European Under-19 Championship. He made his debut on 8 February in a friendly match against Belarus, scoring the team's only goal in a 1–0 win. On 27 March 2011, Hazard scored the game-winning goal converting a penalty in a 2–1 win over Ukraine. In Elite Round qualification for the 2011 UEFA European Under-19 Championship, Hazard featured as a starter and played the entire match in all three group stage matches. In the second group stage match against Estonia, Hazard netted the winner in the 88th minute to give Belgium a 3–2 win. The victory allowed the nation to qualify for the tournament with one match to spare. Belgium ultimately finished the Elite Round unbeaten.

At the 2011 UEFA European Under-19 Championship, Hazard featured in two of the three group stage matches Belgium contested. In the team's opening match against Spain, Hazard assisted on the team's only goal in a 4–1 defeat after his shot from distance was blocked by the Spanish defence and fell into the path of teammate Florent Cuvelier, who converted his shot. Belgium ultimately finished last in its group, which resulted in the team being eliminated from the tournament.

Due to being an underage player in the 2010–11 season, Hazard remained eligible to play on the under-19 team for the 2011–12 season. In the first match of the campaign against Denmark, Hazard scored the team's only goal converting a penalty in a 1–1 draw. On 7 September 2011, he scored the second goal in the team's 4–1 friendly match win over Turkey. In first round qualification for the 2012 UEFA European Under-19 Championship, Hazard scored a team-leading three goals. In the first group match against Wales, he scored a double in a 3–0 win and, in the team's final group match against Scotland, Hazard netted the second goal in a 3–1 victory. In Elite Round qualification, Hazard appeared in two of the team's three group stage matches as Belgium finished third in the group behind favourites Spain and Italy.

=== Senior ===
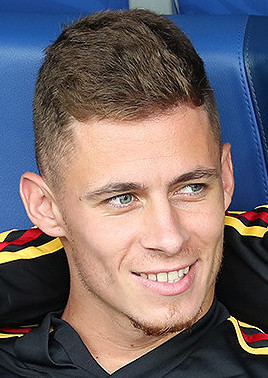
Hazard with Belgium at the 2018 FIFA World Cup

On 16 May 2013, Hazard earned his first senior call-up after being included in then-manager Marc Wilmots' 28-man squad ahead of a friendly with the United States followed by a 2014 FIFA World Cup qualifier against Serbia. On 29 May, he made his senior international debut for Belgium as a second-half substitute for Chelsea teammate Romelu Lukaku in the 4–2 friendly win over the United States. Hazard was one of seven standby players named for Belgium's squad for the 2014 World Cup final stages. It took him three-and-a-half years to gain his second cap, in a 1–1 Low Countries derby friendly away to the Netherlands on 9 November 2016, again from the bench.

Hazard scored his first goal in a 2018 FIFA World Cup qualifier on 10 October 2017 in a 4–0 home victory against Cyprus. On 4 June 2018, manager Roberto Martínez named Hazard in Belgium's 23-man squad for the 2018 FIFA World Cup in Russia. He made his tournament debut on 18 June, playing the last seven minutes of the group match against Panama in place of Dries Mertens in a 3–0 victory, and played the entirety of the 1–0 win against England in the next match in Kaliningrad; the Belgians finished in a best-ever third place.

On 17 June 2021, he scored one goal in Belgium's Group B game, a 2–1 win against Denmark in Euro 2020. On 27 June, he scored the only goal in a 1–0 win over Portugal in the round of 16, a 42nd-minute goal outside the box against Portugal to bring Belgium into the quarterfinals. On 2 July, he started in the quarterfinal match against eventual tournament winners Italy in a 2–1 loss, eliminating Belgium from the tournament.

In November 2022, he was named in the 26-man squad for the 2022 FIFA World Cup in Qatar.

== Career statistics ==
=== Club ===
As of match played 30 October 2026

Appearances and goals by club, season and competition
Club	Season	League			National cup (Note: Includes Coupe de France, Belgian Cup, DFB-Pokal, KNVB Cup)		League cup (Note: Includes Coupe de la Ligue)		Europe		Total	
Club	Season	Division	Apps	Goals	Apps	Goals	Apps	Goals	Apps	Goals	Apps	Goals
Lens	2011–12	Ligue 2	14	0	2	0	1	0	—		17	0
Chelsea	2012–13	Premier League	0	0	0	0	0	0	—		0	0
Chelsea	2013–14	Premier League	0	0	0	0	0	0	—		0	0
Chelsea	2014–15	Premier League	0	0	0	0	0	0	—		0	0
Chelsea	Total		0	0	0	0	0	0	0	0	0	0
Zulte Waregem (loan)	2012–13	Belgian Pro League	34	4	3	0	—		—		37	4
Zulte Waregem (loan)	2013–14	Belgian Pro League	39	14	4	1	—		10 (Note: Appearances in UEFA Europa League)	2	53	17
Zulte Waregem (loan)	Total		73	18	7	1	1	0	10	2	90	21
Borussia Mönchengladbach (loan)	2014–15	Bundesliga	28	1	4	1	—		9	3	41	5
Borussia Mönchengladbach	2015–16	Bundesliga	29	4	3	2	—		4 (Note: Appearances in UEFA Champions League)	0	36	6
Borussia Mönchengladbach	2016–17	Bundesliga	23	6	2	1	—		8 (Note: Six appearances and four goals in UEFA Champions League, two appearances in UEFA Europa League)	4	33	11
Borussia Mönchengladbach	2017–18	Bundesliga	34	10	3	1	—		—		37	11
Borussia Mönchengladbach	2018–19	Bundesliga	33	10	2	3	—		—		35	13
Borussia Mönchengladbach	Total		147	31	14	8	0	0	21	7	182	46
Borussia Dortmund	2019–20	Bundesliga	33	7	3	0	—		7	0	43	7
Borussia Dortmund	2020–21	Bundesliga	16	1	5	2	—		7	1	28	4
Borussia Dortmund	2021–22	Bundesliga	23	4	3	2	—		4 (Note: Three appearances in UEFA Champions League, one appearance in UEFA Europa League)	0	30	6
Borussia Dortmund	2022–23	Bundesliga	14	0	2	0	—		5	1	21	1
Borussia Dortmund	2023–24	Bundesliga	1	0	0	0	—		—		1	0
Borussia Dortmund	Total		87	12	13	4	0	0	23	2	123	18
PSV (loan)	2022–23	Eredivisie	9	1	3	1	—		1	0	13	2
Anderlecht	2023–24	Belgian Pro League	22	4	2	0	—		—		24	4
Anderlecht	2024–25	Belgian Pro League	20	2	4	0	—		4	0	28	2
Anderlecht	2025–26	Belgian Pro League	36	13	5	2	—		5 (Note: Two appearances in UEFA Europa League, three appearances in UEFA Conference League)	0	46	15
Anderlecht	Total		78	19	11	2	0	0	9	0	98	21
Lens	2026–27	Ligue 1	7	1	0	0	—		1	0	8	1
Career total			415	82	50	16	1	0	63	11	531	109

=== International ===
Appearances and goals by national team and year
National team	Year	Apps	Goals
Belgium	2013	1	0
Belgium	2014	0	0
Belgium	2015	0	0
Belgium	2016	1	0
Belgium	2017	6	1
Belgium	2018	11	2
Belgium	2019	7	1
Belgium	2020	5	0
Belgium	2021	9	5
Belgium	2022	6	0
Total		47	9

Scores and results list Belgium's goal tally first, score column indicates score after each Hazard goal.

International goals by date, venue, cap, opponent, score, result and competition
No.	Date	Venue	Cap	Opponent	Score	Result	Competition
1	10 October 2017	King Baudouin Stadium, Brussels, Belgium	6	Cyprus	2–0	4–0	2018 FIFA World Cup qualification
2	18 November 2018	Swissporarena, Lucerne, Switzerland	19	Switzerland	1–0	2–5	2018–19 UEFA Nations League A
3	18 November 2018	Swissporarena, Lucerne, Switzerland	19	Switzerland	2–0	2–5	2018–19 UEFA Nations League A
4	16 November 2019	Krestovsky Stadium, Saint Petersburg, Russia	25	Russia	1–0	4–1	UEFA Euro 2020 qualifying
5	24 March 2021	Den Dreef, Leuven, Belgium	32	Wales	2–1	3–1	2022 FIFA World Cup qualification
6	3 June 2021	King Baudouin Stadium, Brussels, Belgium	34	Greece	1–0	1–1	Friendly
7	17 June 2021	Parken Stadium, Copenhagen, Denmark	37	Denmark	1–1	2–1	UEFA Euro 2020
8	27 June 2021	Estadio de La Cartuja, Seville, Spain	38	Portugal	1–0	1–0	UEFA Euro 2020
9	13 November 2021	King Baudouin Stadium, Brussels, Belgium	40	Estonia	3–1	3–1	2022 FIFA World Cup qualification

== Honours ==
Borussia Dortmund

- DFB-Pokal: 2020–21

PSV

- KNVB Cup: 2022–23

Belgium

- FIFA World Cup third place: 2018

Individual

- Belgian Golden Shoe: 2013
- Belgian Footballer of the Year: 2013–14
