= Gregor Kobel =

Swiss footballer (born 1997)

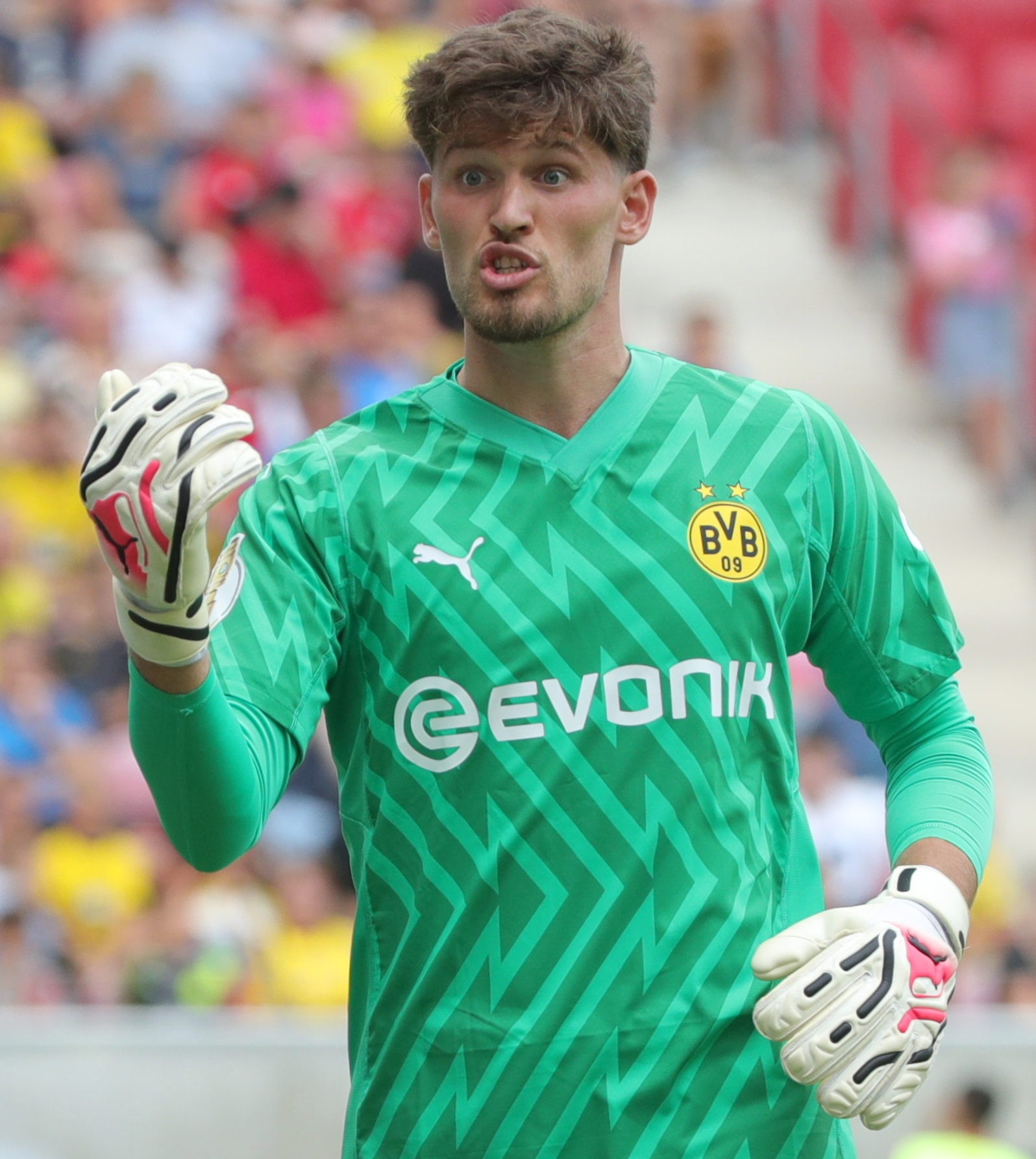
- Kobel playing for Borussia Dortmund in 2023

Personal information
- Full name: Gregor Kobel
- Date of birth: 6 December 1997 (age 28)
- Place of birth: Zurich, Switzerland
- Height: 1.95 m (6 ft 5 in)
- Position: Goalkeeper

Team information
- Current team: Borussia Dortmund
- Number: 1

Youth career
- Zürich
- 2013–2016: Grasshoppers
- 2014–2016: → TSG Hoffenheim (loan)

Senior career*
Years	Team	Apps	(Gls)
2016–2020	TSG Hoffenheim	1	(0)
2019	→ FC Augsburg (loan)	16	(0)
2019–2020	→ VfB Stuttgart (loan)	31	(0)
2020–2021	VfB Stuttgart	33	(0)
2021–	Borussia Dortmund	157	(0)

International career^{‡}
2014	Switzerland U17	4	(0)
2015	Switzerland U18	1	(0)
2015–2016	Switzerland U19	6	(0)
2016	Switzerland U20	2	(0)
2016–2018	Switzerland U21	9	(0)
2021–	Switzerland	31	(0)
- * Club domestic league appearances and goals as of 20:23, 31 October 2026 (UTC) ‡ National team caps and goals as of 23:40, 13 November 2026 (UTC)

Gregor Kobel (born 6 December 1997) is a Swiss professional footballer who plays as a goalkeeper for Bundesliga club Borussia Dortmund and the Switzerland national team.

== Club career ==
=== TSG Hoffenheim ===
Kobel made his professional debut for TSG Hoffenheim on 12 August 2018, starting in the first round of the 2017–18 DFB-Pokal against 3. Liga side Rot-Weiß Erfurt. Hoffenheim won the away match 1–0.

=== VfB Stuttgart ===
For the 2019–20 season Kobel was loaned out to VfB Stuttgart. On 28 July 2020, Kobel moved permanently to VfB Stuttgart and signed a contract until June 2024.

=== Borussia Dortmund ===
On 31 May 2021, Kobel signed a five-year contract with Borussia Dortmund ahead of the 2021–22 season. The transfer fee paid to VfB Stuttgart was 15 million euros.

On 5 October 2023, Kobel signed new long term deal at Borussia Dortmund valid until June 2028. In the 2023–24 Champions League, he played a crucial role in reaching the final with his club, becoming the first Swiss goalkeeper to achieve this feat. He was eventually named in the Team of the Season in that competition.

== International career ==
Kobel was a youth international for Switzerland. He was called up to the senior team for the first time in 2020.

In 2021, he was called up to the national team for the UEFA Euro 2020, where the team upset favorites France on route to the quarter-finals, where they were eventually lost to Spain.

He made his debut on 1 September 2021 in a friendly against Greece, a 2–1 victory at home.

He was part of the Swiss squad at the 2022 FIFA World Cup with the national team coach Murat Yakin, but only played in the last matchday against Serbia, replacing the injured Yann Sommer, which they won 3–2. Having not played a single game in UEFA Euro 2024, he became the starter goalkeeper after the latter's retirement from the national team.

On 20 May 2026, Kobel was selected in the 26-man squad for the 2026 FIFA World Cup. In the Round of 16 match against Colombia, he was named Man of the Match after making crucial saves throughout the game, including a decisive save in the penalty shootout that helped his team reach the quarter-finals for the first time since 1954.

== Career statistics ==
=== Club ===
As of match played 31 October 2026

Appearances and goals by club, season and competition
Club	Season	League			DFB-Pokal		Europe		Other		Total	
Club	Season	Division	Apps	Goals	Apps	Goals	Apps	Goals	Apps	Goals	Apps	Goals
TSG Hoffenheim II	2015–16	Regionalliga Südwest	5	0	—		—		—		5	0
TSG Hoffenheim II	2016–17	Regionalliga Südwest	26	0	—		—		—		26	0
TSG Hoffenheim II	2017–18	Regionalliga Südwest	8	0	—		—		—		8	0
TSG Hoffenheim II	2018–19	Regionalliga Südwest	4	0	—		—		—		4	0
TSG Hoffenheim II	Total		43	0	—		—		—		43	0
TSG Hoffenheim	2016–17	Bundesliga	0	0	0	0	—		—		0	0
TSG Hoffenheim	2017–18	Bundesliga	0	0	2	0	1 (Note: Appearance in UEFA Europa League)	0	—		3	0
TSG Hoffenheim	2018–19	Bundesliga	1	0	2	0	0	0	—		3	0
TSG Hoffenheim	Total		1	0	4	0	1	0	—		6	0
FC Augsburg (loan)	2018–19	Bundesliga	16	0	2	0	—		—		18	0
VfB Stuttgart (loan)	2019–20	2. Bundesliga	31	0	0	0	—		—		31	0
VfB Stuttgart	2020–21	Bundesliga	33	0	1	0	—		—		34	0
VfB Stuttgart	Stuttgart total		64	0	1	0	—		—		65	0
Borussia Dortmund	2021–22	Bundesliga	29	0	2	0	8 (Note: Six appearances in UEFA Champions League, two appearances in UEFA Europa League)	0	1 (Note: Appearance in Franz Beckenbauer Supercup)	0	40	0
Borussia Dortmund	2022–23	Bundesliga	27	0	4	0	4 (Note: Appearances in UEFA Champions League)	0	—		35	0
Borussia Dortmund	2023–24	Bundesliga	27	0	3	0	12	0	—		42	0
Borussia Dortmund	2024–25	Bundesliga	32	0	2	0	13	0	5 (Note: Appearances in FIFA Club World Cup)	0	52	0
Borussia Dortmund	2025–26	Bundesliga	34	0	3	0	10	0	—		47	0
Borussia Dortmund	2026–27	Bundesliga	8	0	1	0	3	0	1	0	13	0
Borussia Dortmund	Total		157	0	15	0	50	0	7	0	229	0
Career total			281	0	22	0	51	0	7	0	361	0

=== International ===
As of match played 13 November 2026

Appearances and goals by national team and year
National team	Year	Apps	Goals
Switzerland	2021	1	0
Switzerland	2022	3	0
Switzerland	2023	1	0
Switzerland	2024	5	0
Switzerland	2025	9	0
Switzerland	2026	12	0
Total		31	0

== Honours ==
Borussia Dortmund

- UEFA Champions League runner-up: 2023–24
- DFL Super Cup runner-up: 2021, 2026

Individual

- UEFA European Under-17 Championship Team of the Tournament: 2014
- Bundesliga Team of the Season: 2022–23, 2023–24, 2025–26
- VDV Bundesliga Team of the Season: 2022–23, 2023–24
- The Athletic Bundesliga Team of the Season: 2023–24
- UEFA Champions League Team of the Season: 2023–24
