= Leon Tigges =

German footballer

Personal information
- Date of birth: 31 July 1998 (age 28)
- Place of birth: Osnabrück, Germany
- Height: 1.93 m (6 ft 4 in)
- Position: Goalkeeper

Team information
- Current team: SV Rödinghausen
- Number: 31

Youth career
- –2017: VfL Osnabrück

Senior career*
Years	Team	Apps	(Gls)
2016	VfL Osnabrück II	1	(0)
2016–2018	VfL Osnabrück	4	(0)
2018–2019	Alemannia Aachen	1	(0)
2019–2021	VfL Vichttal	16	(0)
2021–	SV Rödinghausen	10	(0)
- * Club domestic league appearances and goals as of 12 November 2022

Leon Tigges (born 31 July 1998) is a German footballer who plays as a goalkeeper for SV Rödinghausen.

== Personal life ==
His twin brother Steffen is also a footballer and the pair played together at VfL Osnabrück.
