= Steffen Tigges =

German footballer (born 1998)

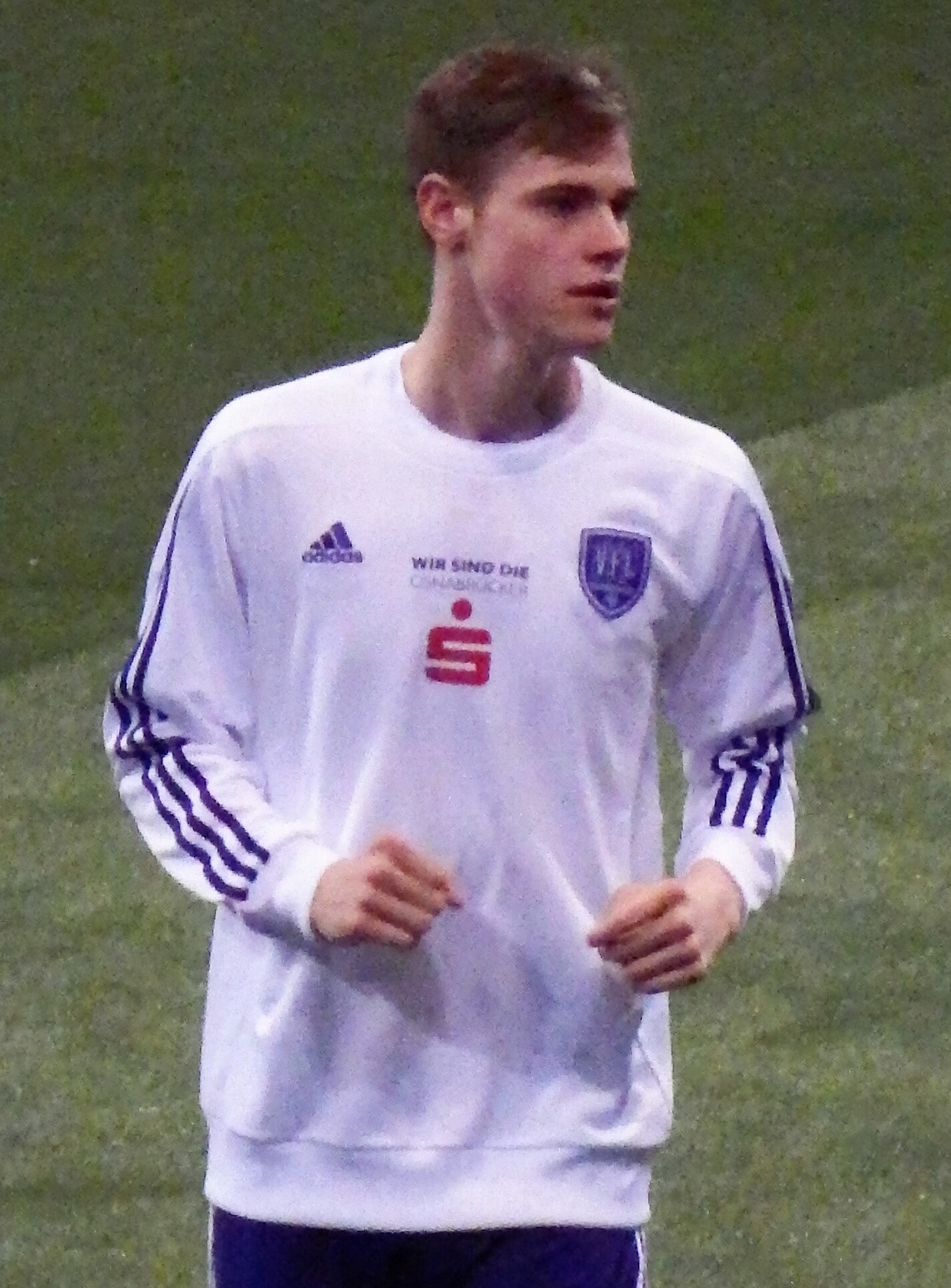
- Tigges training with VfL Osnabrück in 2016

Personal information
- Date of birth: 31 July 1998 (age 28)
- Place of birth: Osnabrück, Germany
- Height: 1.93 m (6 ft 4 in)
- Position: Forward

Team information
- Current team: SC Paderborn
- Number: 27

Youth career
- –2011: TuS Glane
- 2011–2017: VfL Osnabrück

Senior career*
Years	Team	Apps	(Gls)
2015–2019	VfL Osnabrück	84	(4)
2016	VfL Osnabrück II	2	(2)
2019–2022	Borussia Dortmund II	64	(34)
2021–2022	Borussia Dortmund	15	(3)
2022–2023	1. FC Köln II	2	(0)
2022–2025	1. FC Köln	71	(9)
2025–	SC Paderborn	39	(8)

International career^{‡}
2017	Germany U19	1	(0)
2017	Germany U20	4	(0)
- * Club domestic league appearances and goals as of 31 October 2026 ‡ National team caps and goals as of 18:33, 11 February 2024 (UTC)

Steffen Tigges (born 31 July 1998) is a German professional footballer who plays as a striker for Bundesliga club SC Paderborn.

== Club career ==
=== VfL Osnabrück ===
Tigges started his career at his hometown club VfL Osnabrück. He was part of the Osnabrück team that won the 2018–19 3. Liga championship, but only made five starts, playing mostly as a left winger. With his contract expiring, it was announced in April that he would join Borussia Dortmund II in the Regionalliga West for the following season.

=== Borussia Dortmund ===
Tigges scored 9 goals in the Regionalliga West during his first year with Dortmund II. In his second season, Tigges captained Dortmund II as they won the Regionalliga West, scoring 22 goals, and also played in the first team. His first game for the senior team was a DFB-Pokal match against Eintracht Braunschweig. On 3 January 2021, Tigges came on as a substitute for Erling Haaland in Borussia Dortmund's match against VfL Wolfsburg, making his Bundesliga debut. He made 6 appearances in the 2020–21 Bundesliga, and also played in the UEFA Champions League knockout stages against Manchester City.

In the 2021–22 season, Tigges played in all competitions for the first team, scoring 3 Bundesliga goals.

=== 1. FC Köln ===
Tigges joined 1. FC Köln in 2022. He scored his first goal for Köln in a 3-2 comeback win over former club Dortmund in October. and scored two in another 3-2 win two weeks later against FC Augsburg.

Tigges scored a goal from his own half against Werder Bremen in a surprise 7-1 win in the first game of 2023, in which he managed a brace and an assist. He ended the season as the club's highest scoring striker, with 6 goals.

In the 2023–24 season Tigges did not score until the 28th matchday, but scored two crucial equalisers in comebacks against VfL Bochum and Union Berlin which gave Köln a chance of survival. Köln were ultimately relegated, finishing 17th and scoring the fewest goals in the league.

=== SC Paderborn ===
On 6 August 2025, Tigges signed with SC Paderborn in 2. Bundesliga.

== Personal life ==
Tigges' twin brother Leon is also a professional footballer.

== Career statistics ==
As of match played 31 October 2026

Appearances and goals by club, season and competition
Club	Season	League			DFB-Pokal		Europe		Other		Total	
Club	Season	Division	Apps	Goals	Apps	Goals	Apps	Goals	Apps	Goals	Apps	Goals
VfL Osnabrück	2015–16	3. Liga	12	1	0	0	—		1 (Note: Appearance(s) in Lower Saxony Cup)	0	13	1
VfL Osnabrück	2016–17	3. Liga	16	0	0	0	—		2	1	18	1
VfL Osnabrück	2017–18	3. Liga	27	1	0	0	—		2	0	29	1
VfL Osnabrück	2018–19	3. Liga	25	2	0	0	—		3	1	28	3
VfL Osnabrück	Total		80	4	0	0	—		8	2	88	6
VfL Osnabrück II	2016–17	Oberliga Niedersachsen	2	2	—		—		—		2	2
Borussia Dortmund II	2019–20	Regionalliga West	25	9	—		—		—		25	9
Borussia Dortmund II	2020–21	Regionalliga West	35	22	—		—		—		35	22
Borussia Dortmund II	2021–22	3. Liga	5	4	—		—		—		5	4
Borussia Dortmund II	Total		65	35	—		—		—		65	35
Borussia Dortmund	2020–21	Bundesliga	6	0	1	0	1 (Note: Appearance in UEFA Champions League)	0	0	0	8	0
Borussia Dortmund	2021–22	Bundesliga	9	3	2	0	4 (Note: Two appearances in UEFA Champions League, two appearances in UEFA Europa League)	0	0	0	15	3
Borussia Dortmund	Total		15	3	3	0	5	0	0	0	23	3
1. FC Köln II	2022–23	Regionalliga West	1	0	—		—		—		1	0
1. FC Köln II	2023–24	Regionalliga West	1	0	—		—		—		1	0
1. FC Köln II	Total		2	0	—		—		—		2	0
1. FC Köln	2022–23	Bundesliga	30	6	0	0	7 (Note: Appearances in UEFA Conference League)	1	—		37	7
1. FC Köln	2023–24	Bundesliga	25	3	1	0	—		—		26	3
1. FC Köln	2024–25	2. Bundesliga	16	0	2	0	—		—		18	0
1. FC Köln	Total		71	9	3	0	7	1	—		81	10
SC Paderborn	2025–26	2. Bundesliga	31	6	1	0	—		2 (Note: Appearances in 2. Bundesliga promotion play-offs)	0	34	6
SC Paderborn	2026–27	Bundesliga	8	2	2	0	—		—		10	2
SC Paderborn	Total		39	8	2	0	—		2	0	43	8
Career total			274	61	9	0	12	1	10	2	305	64

== Honours ==
1.FC Koln

- 2.Bundesliga: 2024–25
