= Raphael Tigges =

German politician (born 1973)

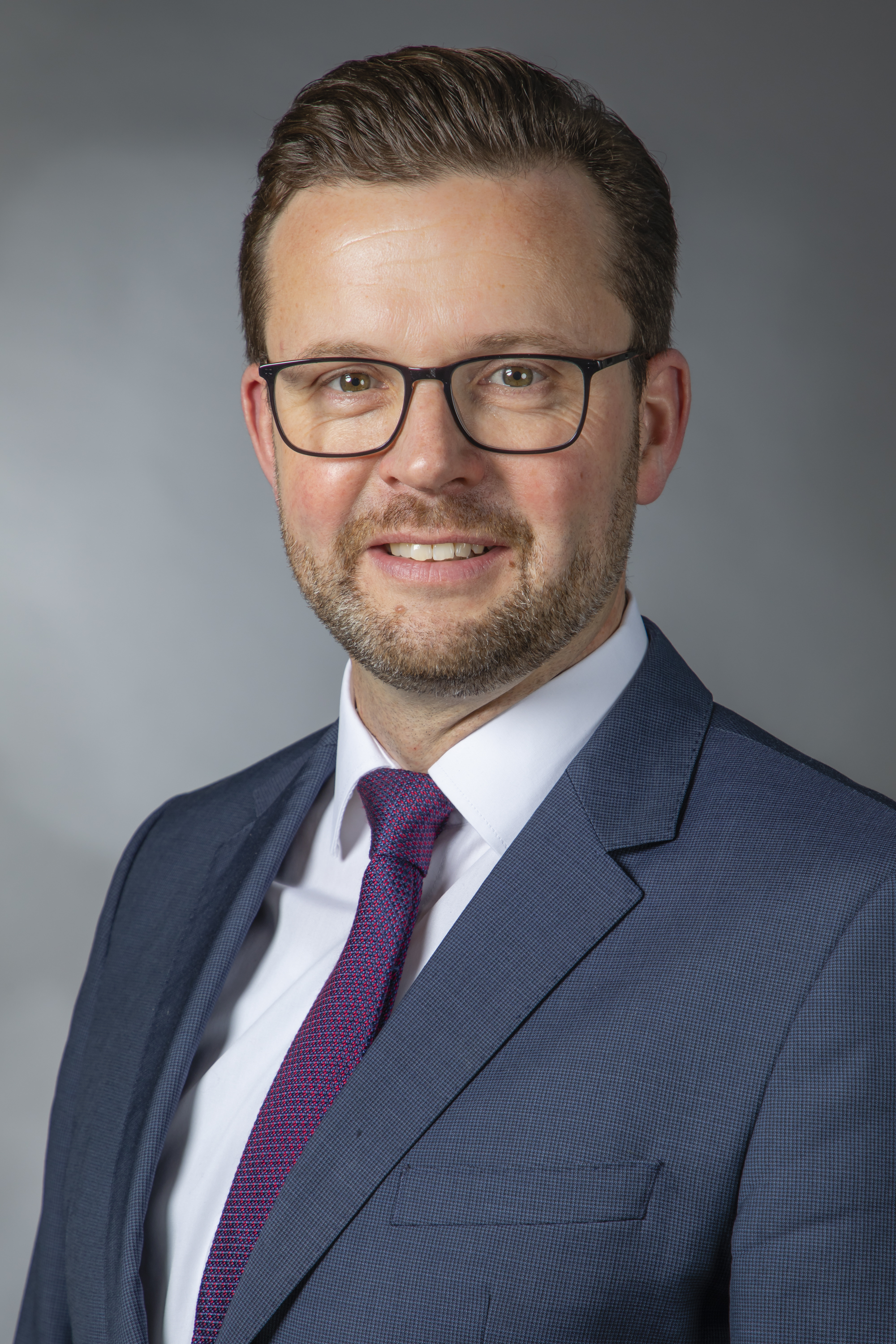
- Tigges in 2019

Member of the Landtag of North Rhine-Westphalia
- Incumbent
- Assumed office 1 June 2017
- Preceded by: Hans Feuß
- Constituency: Gütersloh II

Personal details
- Born: 26 May 1973 (age 52) Gütersloh
- Party: Christian Democratic Union (since 1991)

Raphael Tigges (born 26 May 1973 in Gütersloh) is a German politician serving as a member of the Landtag of North Rhine-Westphalia since 2017. He has served as chairman of the Christian Democratic Union in Gütersloh since 2019.
