= Luca Unbehaun =

German footballer (born 2001)

Personal information
- Date of birth: 27 February 2001 (age 25)
- Place of birth: Bochum, Germany
- Height: 1.85 m (6 ft 1 in)
- Position: Goalkeeper

Team information
- Current team: Hansa Rostock
- Number: 1

Youth career
- 2006–2009: SC Union-Bergen
- 2009–2016: VfL Bochum
- 2016–2020: Borussia Dortmund

Senior career*
| Years | Team | Apps | (Gls) |
| 2020–2023 | Borussia Dortmund II | 59 | (0) |
| 2020–2023 | Borussia Dortmund | 0 | (0) |
| 2023–2024 | SC Verl | 33 | (0) |
| 2024–2026 | Emmen | 69 | (0) |
| 2026– | Hansa Rostock | 0 | (0) |

International career^{‡}
| 2016–2017 | Germany U16 | 5 | (0) |
| 2018 | Germany U17 | 7 | (0) |
| 2018–2019 | Germany U18 | 2 | (0) |
| 2020 | Germany U20 | 2 | (0) |
- * Club domestic league appearances and goals as of 28 April 2026 ‡ National team caps and goals as of 22:25, 24 July 2021 (UTC)

Luca Unbehaun (born 27 February 2001) is a German professional footballer who plays as a goalkeeper for 3. Liga club Hansa Rostock. He was included in The Guardian's "Next Generation 2018".

== Club career ==
Unbehaun played for Borussia Dortmund's youth ranks since 2016 and joined the first team in 2019. He left in May 2023, along with four other players.

On 26 June 2023, Unbehaun signed with SC Verl in 3. Liga.

On 23 June 2024, Unbehaun moved to Emmen in the Netherlands on a two-year deal.

On 2 June 2026, Unbehaun signed for 3. Liga club Hansa Rostock ahead of the 2026–27 season.

== International career ==
Unbehaun has represented Germany at numerous youth levels.

== Career statistics ==
As of match played 17 September 2022

Appearances and goals by club, season and competition
| Club | Season | League | | | Cup | | Continental | | Other | | Total | |
| Club | Season | Division | Apps | Goals | Apps | Goals | Apps | Goals | Apps | Goals | Apps | Goals |
|---|---|---|---|---|---|---|---|---|---|---|---|---|
| Borussia Dortmund II | 2019–20 | Regionalliga | 5 | 0 | – | | – | | 0 | 0 | 5 | 0 |
| Borussia Dortmund II | 2020–21 | Regionalliga | 26 | 0 | – | | – | | 0 | 0 | 26 | 0 |
| Borussia Dortmund II | 2021–22 | 3. Liga | 22 | 0 | – | | – | | 0 | 0 | 22 | 0 |
| Borussia Dortmund II | 2022–23 | 3. Liga | 6 | 0 | – | | – | | 0 | 0 | 6 | 0 |
| Career total | | | 56 | 0 | 0 | 0 | 0 | 0 | 0 | 0 | 56 | 0 |

== Honours ==
Individual

- Fritz Walter Medal U17 Bronze: 2018
