= 2019–20 Borussia Dortmund season =

111th season in existence of Borussia Dortmund

Borussia Dortmund
2019–20 season
- President: Reinhard Rauball
- Chairman: Hans-Joachim Watzke
- Head coach: Lucien Favre
- Stadium: Signal Iduna Park
- Bundesliga: 2nd
- DFB-Pokal: Round of 16
- DFL-Supercup: Winners
- UEFA Champions League: Round of 16
- Top goalscorer: League: Jadon Sancho (17); All: Jadon Sancho (20)
- Biggest win: Dortmund 5–0 Fortuna Düsseldorf; Dortmund 5–0 Union Berlin; SC Paderborn 1–6 Dortmund (all in Bundesliga)
- Biggest defeat: Bayern Munich 4–0 Dortmund; Dortmund 0–4 1899 Hoffenheim (both in Bundesliga)
Home colours	Away colours	Third colours

The 2019–20 Borussia Dortmund season was the 111th season in the football club's history and 44th consecutive and 53rd overall season in the top flight of German football, the Bundesliga, having been promoted from the 2. Bundesliga Nord in 1976.

In addition to the domestic league, Borussia Dortmund also participated in the season's editions of the domestic cup, the DFB-Pokal, and the first-tier continental cup, the UEFA Champions League. This was the 46th season for Dortmund in the Signal Iduna Park, located in Dortmund, North Rhine-Westphalia, Germany. The season covered a period from 1 July 2019 to 30 June 2020.

== Transfers ==
=== Transfers in ===
#	Position	Player	Transferred from	Fee	Date	Source
19	MF	(Germany) Julian Brandt	(Germany) Bayer Leverkusen	€25,000,000	22 May 2019	
23	MF	(Belgium) Thorgan Hazard	(Germany) Borussia Mönchengladbach	€25,500,000	22 May 2019	
14	DF	(Germany) Nico Schulz	(Germany) 1899 Hoffenheim	€25,500,000	22 May 2019	
15	DF	(Germany) Mats Hummels	(Germany) Bayern Munich	€30,500,000	19 June 2019	
22	DF	(Spain) Mateu Morey	(Spain) Barcelona U19	Free	1 July 2019	
17	FW	(Norway) Erling Haaland	(Austria) Red Bull Salzburg	€20,000,000	3 January 2020	

==== Loans in ====
#	Position	Player	Loaned from	Date	Loan expires	Source
5	DF	(Morocco) Achraf Hakimi	(Spain) Real Madrid	11 July 2018	30 June 2020	
27	MF	(Germany) Emre Can	(Italy) Juventus	31 January 2020	30 June 2020	

=== Transfers out ===
#	Position	Player	Transferred to	Fee	Date	Source
14	FW	(Sweden) Alexander Isak	(Spain) Real Sociedad	€6,500,000	1 July 2019	
4	DF	(France) Abdou Diallo	(France) Paris Saint-Germain	€32,000,000	16 July 2019	
18	MF	(Germany) Sebastian Rode	(Germany) Eintracht Frankfurt	€4,000,000	27 July 2019	
23	MF	(Japan) Shinji Kagawa	(Spain) Zaragoza	€3,000,000	9 August 2019	
20	FW	(Germany) Maximilian Philipp	(Russia) Dynamo Moscow	€20,000,000	9 August 2019	
33	MF	(Germany) Julian Weigl	(Portugal) Benfica	€20,000,000	31 December 2019	
9	FW	(Spain) Paco Alcácer	(Spain) Villarreal	€23,000,000	30 January 2020	
34	FW	(Denmark) Jacob Bruun Larsen	(Germany) 1899 Hoffenheim	€9,000,000	31 January 2020	

==== Loans out ====
#	Position	Player	Loaned to	Date	Loan expires	Source
32	MF	(Germany) Dženis Burnić	(Germany) Dynamo Dresden	31 January 2019	30 June 2020	
30	DF	(Germany) Felix Passlack	(Netherlands) Fortuna Sittard	2 July 2019	30 June 2020	
15	DF	(Germany) Jeremy Toljan	(Italy) Sassuolo	11 July 2019	30 June 2020	
21	FW	(Germany) André Schürrle	(Russia) Spartak Moscow	31 July 2019	30 June 2020	
36	DF	(Turkey) Ömer Toprak	(Germany) Werder Bremen	11 August 2019	30 June 2020	
17	MF	(Spain) Sergio Gómez	(Spain) Huesca	12 August 2019	30 June 2020	
27	FW	(Germany) Marius Wolf	(Germany) Hertha BSC	2 September 2019	30 June 2020	

== Players ==
As of 31 January 2020

Note: Flags indicate national team as defined under FIFA eligibility rules; some limited exceptions apply. Players may hold more than one non-FIFA nationality.

No.	Pos.	Nation	Player
1	GK	SUI	Roman Bürki
2	DF	FRA	Dan-Axel Zagadou
5	DF	MAR	Achraf Hakimi
6	MF	DEN	Thomas Delaney
7	MF	ENG	Jadon Sancho
8	MF	GER	Mahmoud Dahoud
10	FW	GER	Mario Gotze
11	FW	GER	Marco Reus (captain)
13	DF	POR	Raphaël Guerreiro
14	DF	GER	Nico Schulz
15	DF	GER	Mats Hummels

No.	Pos.	Nation	Player
16	DF	SUI	Manuel Akanji
17	FW	NOR	Erling Haaland
18	DF	ARG	Leonardo Balerdi
19	MF	GER	Julian Brandt
22	DF	ESP	Mateu Morey
23	MF	BEL	Thorgan Hazard
26	DF	POL	Łukasz Piszczek (vice-captain)
27	MF	GER	Emre Can
28	MF	BEL	Axel Witsel
29	DF	GER	Marcel Schmelzer
32	MF	USA	Giovanni Reyna
35	GK	SUI	Marwin Hitz

== Kits ==
Supplier: Puma / Sponsor: Evonik Industries

Home (League)	Home alt.1 (League)	Home alt.2 (League)	Away	Third	Home (Cup+Europe)

== Friendly matches ==
Win Draw Loss

12 July 2019 Friendly	FC Schweinberg	0–10	Borussia Dortmund	Schweinberg, Germany
17:30 CEST (UTC+2)		Report	Raschl 12', 68'; Philipp 39', 40', 43', 77'; Wolf 44'; Morey 58'; Aydinel 83'; Kagawa 87'	Stadium: Sportplatz Hardheim; Attendance: 5,000; Referee: Tobias Fritsch (Germany)

18 July 2019 Friendly	Seattle Sounders FC	1–3	Borussia Dortmund	Seattle, United States
04:30 CEST (UTC+2)	Campbell 55'	Report	Wolf 37'; Alcácer 50'; Sancho 77'	Stadium: CenturyLink Field; Attendance: 37,722; Referee: Allen Chapman (United States)

20 July 2019 Friendly	Liverpool	2–3	Borussia Dortmund	Notre Dame, United States
02:00 CEST (UTC+2)	Wilson 35'; Larouci (yellow card) 43'; Brewster 75' (pen.), (yellow card) 84'	Report	Alcácer 3'; Hummels (yellow card) 11'; Delaney 53'; Bruun Larsen 58'	Stadium: Notre Dame Stadium; Attendance: 40,361; Referee: Nima Saghafi (United States)

27 July 2019 Friendly	Borussia Dortmund	4–1	Udinese	Altach, Austria
17:15 CEST (UTC+2)	Hazard 6'; Götze 19' (pen.); Weigl 28'; Brandt 44'; Reus (yellow card) 83'	Report	Mandragora 76'; De Maio (yellow card) 82'	Stadium: Stadion Schnabelholz; Attendance: 5,000; Referee: Robert Schörgenhofer (Austria)
Note: Match abandoned after 83 minutes due to heavy rain.

30 July 2019 Friendly	Zürich	0–6	Borussia Dortmund	Bad Ragaz, Switzerland
07:00 CEST (UTC+2)		Report	Sancho 9', 56', 85'; Delaney 30'; Alcácer 38', 45'	Stadium: Sportplatz Ri-Au

30 July 2019 Friendly	St. Gallen	1–4	Borussia Dortmund	St. Gallen, Switzerland
19:30 CEST (UTC+2)	Rüfli (yellow card) 33'; Vilotić 45+1'	Report	Hakimi 3'; Bruun Larsen 31', 44'; Reus 64'	Stadium: Kybunpark; Attendance: 13,207

10 August 2019 Friendly	Preußen Münster	0–4	Borussia Dortmund	Münster, Germany
15:30 CEST (UTC+2)		Report	Balerdi 24'; Zagadou 76'; Götze 85', 87'	Stadium: Preußenstadion; Attendance: 8,312; Referee: Robin Delfs (Germany)

6 September 2019 Friendly	Energie Cottbus	0–5	Borussia Dortmund	Cottbus, Germany
17:00 CEST (UTC+2)		Report	Khadra 3'; Raschl 67'; Hajtić 70' (o.g.); Tigges 75'; Führich 78'	Stadium: Stadion der Freundschaft; Attendance: 19,000

7 January 2020 Friendly	Standard Liège	0–0	Borussia Dortmund	Marbella, Spain
16:00 CET (UTC+1)	M'Poku (yellow card) 69'	Report		Stadium: Estadio Municipal de Marbella; Attendance: 1,000

11 January 2020 Friendly	Feyenoord	2–4	Borussia Dortmund	Marbella, Spain
12:00 CET (UTC+1)	Jørgensen 22'; Narsingh 90+2'	Report	Guerreiro 1', 54'; Reyna 44'; Führich 66'	Stadium: Estadio Municipal de Marbella

11 January 2020 Friendly	Borussia Dortmund	0–2	Mainz 05	Marbella, Spain
17:00 CET (UTC+1)		Report	Onisiwo 45+1'; Niakhaté 54', (yellow card) 88'; Szalai (yellow card) 86'	Stadium: Estadio Municipal de Marbella

== Competitions ==
Win Draw Loss

=== Overview ===
Competition	First match	Last match	Starting round	Final position	Record							
Competition	First match	Last match	Starting round	Final position	Pld	W	D	L	GF	GA	GD	Win %
Bundesliga	17 August 2019	27 June 2020	Matchday 1	2nd	34	21	6	7	84	41	+43	61.76
DFB-Pokal	9 August 2019	4 February 2020	First round	Round of 16	3	2	0	1	6	4	+2	66.67
DFL-Supercup	3 August 2019		Final	Winners	1	1	0	0	2	0	+2	100.00
Champions League	17 September 2019	11 March 2020	Group stage	Round of 16	8	4	1	3	10	11	−1	50.00
Total					46	28	7	11	102	56	+46	60.87

Source: Competitions

=== Bundesliga ===
==== League table ====
Pos	Team	Pld	W	D	L	GF	GA	GD	Pts	Qualification or relegation
1	Bayern Munich (C)	34	26	4	4	100	32	+68	82	Qualification for the Champions League group stage
2	Borussia Dortmund	34	21	6	7	84	41	+43	69	Qualification for the Champions League group stage
3	RB Leipzig	34	18	12	4	81	37	+44	66	Qualification for the Champions League group stage
4	Borussia Mönchengladbach	34	20	5	9	66	40	+26	65	Qualification for the Champions League group stage
5	Bayer Leverkusen	34	19	6	9	61	44	+17	63	Qualification for the Europa League group stage (Note: Since the winners of the 2019–20 DFB-Pokal, Bayern Munich, qualified for the Champions League based on league position, the Europa League group stage spot was passed to the sixth-placed team, and the Europa League second qualifying round spot was passed to the seventh-placed team.)

Source: DFB
Rules for classification: 1) Points; 2) Goal difference; 3) Goals scored; 4) Head-to-head results; 5) Head-to-head away goals scored; 6) Away goals scored; 7) Play-off.
(C) Champions

==== Results summary ====
Overall								Home						Away					
Pld	W	D	L	GF	GA	GD	Pts	W	D	L	GF	GA	GD	W	D	L	GF	GA	GD
34	21	6	7	84	41	+43	69	11	3	3	46	17	+29	10	3	4	38	24	+14

Source: Bundesliga

==== Results by round ====
Round	1	2	3	4	5	6	7	8	9	10	11	12	13	14	15	16	17	18	19	20	21	22	23	24	25	26	27	28	29	30	31	32	33	34
Ground	H	A	A	H	A	H	A	H	A	H	A	H	A	H	A	H	A	A	H	H	A	H	A	H	A	H	A	H	A	H	A	H	A	H
Result	W	W	L	W	D	D	D	W	D	W	L	D	W	W	W	D	L	W	W	W	L	W	W	W	W	W	W	L	W	W	W	L	W	L
Position	1	1	5	2	3	8	8	4	5	2	6	6	5	3	3	4	4	4	4	3	3	3	3	3	2	2	2	2	2	2	2	2	2	2

Source: DFB
A = Away; H = Home; W = Win; D = Draw; L = Loss

==== Matches ====
The Bundesliga schedule was announced on 28 June 2019.

17 August 2019 1	Borussia Dortmund	5–1	FC Augsburg	Dortmund
15:30 CEST (UTC+2)	Alcácer 3', 59'; Sancho 51'; Reus 57'; Brandt 82'	Report	Niederlechner 1'	Stadium: Signal Iduna Park; Attendance: 81,365; Referee: Frank Willenborg

23 August 2019 2	1. FC Köln	1–3	Borussia Dortmund	Cologne
20:30 CEST (UTC+2)	Drexler 29'; Verstraete (yellow card) 45+1'; Ehizibue (yellow card) 90'	Report	Piszczek (yellow card) 58'; Sancho 70'; Hakimi 86'; Alcácer 90+4'	Stadium: RheinEnergieStadion; Attendance: 50,000; Referee: Christian Dingert

31 August 2019 3	Union Berlin	3–1	Borussia Dortmund	Berlin
18:30 CEST (UTC+2)	Bülter 22', 50'; Andersson 75'	Report	Alcácer 25'	Stadium: Stadion An der Alten Försterei; Attendance: 22,467; Referee: Felix Brych

14 September 2019 4	Borussia Dortmund	4–0	Bayer Leverkusen	Dortmund
15:30 CEST (UTC+2)	Alcácer 28'; Reus 50', 90'; Guerreiro 83'	Report	Amiri (yellow card) 35'; Wendell (yellow card) 52'; Havertz (yellow card) 85'	Stadium: Signal Iduna Park; Attendance: 81,365; Referee: Daniel Siebert

22 September 2019 5	Eintracht Frankfurt	2–2	Borussia Dortmund	Frankfurt
18:00 CEST (UTC+2)	Silva 43'; Touré (yellow card) 65'; Delaney 88' (o.g.); Chandler (yellow card) 90'	Report	Witsel 11'; Hummels (yellow card) 32'; Sancho 66'; Hakimi (yellow card) 86'	Stadium: Commerzbank-Arena; Attendance: 51,500; Referee: Markus Schmidt

28 September 2019 6	Borussia Dortmund	2–2	Werder Bremen	Dortmund
18:30 CEST (UTC+2)	Götze 9'; Reus 41'; Weigl (yellow card) 68'	Report	Rashica 7'; Friedl 55'	Stadium: Signal Iduna Park; Attendance: 81,365; Referee: Deniz Aytekin

5 October 2019 7	SC Freiburg	2–2	Borussia Dortmund	Freiburg
15:30 CEST (UTC+2)	Waldschmidt 55'; Akanji 89' (o.g.)	Report	Witsel 20'; Hummels (yellow card) 44'; Delaney (yellow card) 50'; Hakimi 67', (yellow card) 75'	Stadium: Schwarzwald-Stadion; Attendance: 24,000; Referee: Sven Jablonski

19 October 2019 8	Borussia Dortmund	1–0	Borussia Mönchengladbach	Dortmund
18:30 CEST (UTC+2)	Reus 58'; Delaney (yellow card) 61'	Report	Jantschke (yellow card) 88'; Neuhaus (yellow card) 90+1'	Stadium: Signal Iduna Park; Attendance: 81,365; Referee: Sascha Stegemann

26 October 2019 9	Schalke 04	0–0	Borussia Dortmund	Gelsenkirchen
15:30 CEST (UTC+2)	Stambouli (yellow card) 20'; Sané (yellow card) 83'; Kutucu (yellow card) 90'	Report	Weigl (yellow card) 18'; Hazard (yellow card) 70'	Stadium: Veltins-Arena; Attendance: 61,873; Referee: Felix Brych

2 November 2019 10	Borussia Dortmund	3–0	VfL Wolfsburg	Dortmund
15:30 CET (UTC+1)	Weigl (yellow card) 44'; Hazard 52'; Guerreiro 58'; Götze 88' (pen.)	Report	Nmecha (yellow card) 40'; Brooks (yellow card) 45+2'; Tisserand (yellow card) 69'	Stadium: Signal Iduna Park; Attendance: 80,200; Referee: Tobias Welz

9 November 2019 11	Bayern Munich	4–0	Borussia Dortmund	Munich
18:30 CET (UTC+1)	Lewandowski 17', 76'; Gnabry 47'; Coman (yellow card) 67'; Hummels 80' (o.g.); Kimmich (yellow card) 90'	Report	Reus (yellow card) 63'	Stadium: Allianz Arena; Attendance: 75,000; Referee: Felix Zwayer

22 November 2019 12	Borussia Dortmund	3–3	SC Paderborn	Dortmund
20:30 CET (UTC+1)	Hummels (yellow card) 28'; Sancho 47'; Weigl (yellow card) 74'; Hakimi (yellow card) 84'; Witsel 84'; Reus 90+3'	Report	Mamba 5', 37'; Holtmann 43'; Collins (yellow card) 83'	Stadium: Signal Iduna Park; Attendance: 81,365; Referee: Christian Dingert

30 November 2019 13	Hertha BSC	1–2	Borussia Dortmund	Berlin
15:30 CET (UTC+1)	Grujić (yellow card) 5'; Darida (yellow card) 18', (goal) 34'; Ibišević (yellow card) 83'	Report	Sancho 15'; Hazard 17'; Hummels (yellow card) 19' (yellow-red card) 45'	Stadium: Olympiastadion; Attendance: 74,667; Referee: Sven Jablonski

7 December 2019 14	Borussia Dortmund	5–0	Fortuna Düsseldorf	Dortmund
15:30 CET (UTC+1)	Reus 42', 69'; Hazard 58'; Sancho 63', 74'	Report	Zimmer (yellow card) 2'; Zimmermann (yellow card) 28'; Morales (yellow card) 55'	Stadium: Signal Iduna Park; Attendance: 81,365; Referee: Daniel Siebert

14 December 2019 15	Mainz 05	0–4	Borussia Dortmund	Mainz
15:30 CET (UTC+1)	St. Juste (yellow card) 23'	Report	Reus 32'; Sancho 66'; Hazard 69'; Schulz 84'	Stadium: Opel Arena; Attendance: 33,305; Referee: Benjamin Cortus

17 December 2019 16	Borussia Dortmund	3–3	RB Leipzig	Dortmund
20:30 CET (UTC+1)	Weigl 23'; Brandt 34'; Sancho 55'	Report	Werner 47', 53'; Schick 77'	Stadium: Signal Iduna Park; Attendance: 80,200; Referee: Tobias Stieler

20 December 2019 17	1899 Hoffenheim	2–1	Borussia Dortmund	Sinsheim
20:30 CET (UTC+1)	Adamyan 79'; Kramarić 87'	Report	Götze 17'; Akanji (yellow card) 25'	Stadium: PreZero Arena; Attendance: 30,150; Referee: Felix Zwayer

18 January 2020 18	FC Augsburg	3–5	Borussia Dortmund	Augsburg
15:30 CET (UTC+1)	Niederlechner 34', 55'; Richter 46'	Report	Brandt 49', (yellow card) 77'; Haaland 59', 70', 79'; Sancho 61'	Stadium: WWK Arena; Attendance: 30,660; Referee: Manuel Gräfe

24 January 2020 19	Borussia Dortmund	5–1	1. FC Köln	Dortmund
20:30 CET (UTC+1)	Guerreiro 1'; Reus 29'; Witsel (yellow card) 38'; Sancho 48'; Haaland 78', 87'	Report	Bornauw (yellow card) 13'; Uth 64'	Stadium: Signal Iduna Park; Attendance: 81,365; Referee: Harm Osmers

1 February 2020 20	Borussia Dortmund	5–0	Union Berlin	Dortmund
15:30 CET (UTC+1)	Sancho 13'; Haaland 18', 76'; Reus 68' (pen.); Witsel 70'	Report	Friedrich (yellow card) 64'	Stadium: Signal Iduna Park; Attendance: 81,365; Referee: Benjamin Cortus

8 February 2020 21	Bayer Leverkusen	4–3	Borussia Dortmund	Leverkusen
18:30 CET (UTC+1)	Volland 20', 43', (yellow card) 67'; L. Bender (yellow card) 35', (goal) 82'; Bailey 81'	Report	Hummels 22'; Can 33'; Guerreiro (yellow card) 39', (goal) 65'	Stadium: BayArena; Attendance: 30,210; Referee: Markus Schmidt

14 February 2020 22	Borussia Dortmund	4–0	Eintracht Frankfurt	Dortmund
20:30 CET (UTC+1)	Piszczek 33'; Sancho 50'; Haaland 54'; Guerreiro 74'	Report	Chandler (yellow card) 22'	Stadium: Signal Iduna Park; Attendance: 81,365; Referee: Bastian Dankert

22 February 2020 23	Werder Bremen	0–2	Borussia Dortmund	Bremen
15:30 CET (UTC+1)		Report	Zagadou 52'; Haaland 66'	Stadium: Weser-Stadion; Attendance: 42,100; Referee: Marco Fritz

29 February 2020 24	Borussia Dortmund	1–0	SC Freiburg	Dortmund
15:30 CET (UTC+1)	Sancho 15'; Can (yellow card) 68'	Report		Stadium: Signal Iduna Park; Attendance: 81,365; Referee: Robert Hartmann

7 March 2020 25	Borussia Mönchengladbach	1–2	Borussia Dortmund	Mönchengladbach
18:30 CET (UTC+1)	Stindl 50'; Kramer (yellow card) 62'; Bensebaini (yellow card) 76'; Ginter (yellow card) 84'; Lainer (yellow card) 89'; Neuhaus (yellow card) 90+1'	Report	Hazard 8'; Witsel (yellow card) 41'; Zagadou (yellow card) 45'; Hakimi 72'; Can (yellow card) 73'; Sancho (yellow card) 76'; Guerreiro (yellow card) 89'	Stadium: Borussia-Park; Attendance: 53,877; Referee: Sascha Stegemann

16 May 2020 26	Borussia Dortmund	4–0	Schalke 04	Dortmund
15:30 CEST (UTC+2)	Haaland 29'; Guerreiro 45', 63'; Hazard 48'; Delaney (yellow card) 53'; Piszczek (yellow card) 73'	Report	Sané (yellow card) 48'; Matondo (yellow card) 86'	Stadium: Signal Iduna Park; Attendance: 0 Referee: Deniz Aytekin
Note: The match was postponed on 13 March due to the pandemic of COVID-19 in Germany, and rescheduled to 16 May.

23 May 2020 27	VfL Wolfsburg	0–2	Borussia Dortmund	Wolfsburg
15:30 CEST (UTC+2)	Ginczek (yellow card) 61'; Brooks (yellow card) 66'; Klaus (red card) 82'; Arnold (yellow card) 86'; Schlager (yellow card) 90+2'	Report	Guerreiro 32'; Delaney (yellow card) 55'; Hazard (yellow card) 74'; Hakimi 78'	Stadium: Volkswagen Arena; Attendance: 0 Referee: Daniel Siebert
Note: The match was postponed on 13 March due to the pandemic of COVID-19 in Germany, and rescheduled to 23 May.

26 May 2020 28	Borussia Dortmund	0–1	Bayern Munich	Dortmund
18:30 CEST (UTC+2)	Hummels (yellow card) 13'; Dahoud (yellow card) 67'	Report	Kimmich 43'; Müller (yellow card) 66'; Davies (yellow card) 74'	Stadium: Signal Iduna Park; Attendance: 0 Referee: Tobias Stieler
Note: The match was postponed on 24 March due to the pandemic of COVID-19 in Germany, and rescheduled to 26 May.

31 May 2020 29	SC Paderborn	1–6	Borussia Dortmund	Paderborn
18:00 CEST (UTC+2)	Collins (yellow card) 60'; Hünemeier 72' (pen.); Dräger (yellow card) 82'	Report	Hazard 54'; Sancho 57', 74', 90+1', (yellow card) 58'; Can (yellow card) 71'; Hummels (yellow card) 76'; Hakimi 85'; Schmelzer 89'	Stadium: Benteler-Arena; Attendance: 0 Referee: Daniel Siebert
Note: The match was postponed on 24 March due to the pandemic of COVID-19 in Germany, and rescheduled to 31 May.

6 June 2020 30	Borussia Dortmund	1–0	Hertha BSC	Dortmund
18:30 CEST (UTC+2)	Can 58'	Report	Esswein (yellow card) 76'; Piątek (yellow card) 77'	Stadium: Signal Iduna Park; Attendance: 0 Referee: Harm Osmers
Note: The match was postponed on 24 March due to the pandemic of COVID-19 in Germany, and rescheduled to 6 June.

13 June 2020 31	Fortuna Düsseldorf	0–1	Borussia Dortmund	Düsseldorf
15:30 CEST (UTC+2)	Gießelmann (yellow card) 80'	Report	Hazard (yellow card) 58'; Akanji (yellow card) 70'; Hakimi (yellow card) 85'; Haaland 90+5'	Stadium: Merkur Spiel-Arena; Attendance: 0 Referee: Sascha Stegemann
Note: The match was postponed on 24 March due to the pandemic of COVID-19 in Germany, and rescheduled to 13 June.

17 June 2020 32	Borussia Dortmund	0–2	Mainz 05	Dortmund
20:30 CEST (UTC+2)	Piszczek (yellow card) 18'; Hummels (yellow card) 37'; Can (yellow card) 54'; Guerreiro (yellow card) 79'; Hakimi (yellow card) 81'; Witsel (yellow card) 90'	Report	Martín (yellow card) 30'; Burkardt 33'; Mateta 49' (pen.); Latza (yellow card) 79'; Szalai (yellow card) 87'	Stadium: Signal Iduna Park; Attendance: 0 Referee: Frank Willenborg
Note: The match was postponed on 24 March due to the pandemic of COVID-19 in Germany, and rescheduled to 17 June.

20 June 2020 33	RB Leipzig	0–2	Borussia Dortmund	Leipzig
15:30 CEST (UTC+2)	Schick (yellow card) 21'; Kampl (yellow card) 53'; Angeliño (yellow card) 57'	Report	Haaland 30', 90+3'; Reyna (yellow card) 50'; Can (yellow card) 74'; Witsel (yellow card) 80'	Stadium: Red Bull Arena; Attendance: 0 Referee: Felix Zwayer
Note: The match was postponed on 24 March due to the pandemic of COVID-19 in Germany, and rescheduled to 20 June.

27 June 2020 34	Borussia Dortmund	0–4	1899 Hoffenheim	Dortmund
15:30 CEST (UTC+2)	Balerdi (yellow card) 41'	Report	Kramarić 8', 30', 48', 50' (pen.)	Stadium: Signal Iduna Park; Attendance: 0 Referee: Guido Winkmann
Note: The match was postponed on 7 May due to the pandemic of COVID-19 in Germany, and rescheduled to 27 June.

=== DFB-Pokal ===
9 August 2019 First round	KFC Uerdingen	0–2	Borussia Dortmund	Düsseldorf
20:45 CEST (UTC+2)	Mbom (yellow card) 69'; Großkreutz (yellow card) 90+2'	Report	Reus 49'; Alcácer 70'	Stadium: Merkur Spiel-Arena; Attendance: 32,110; Referee: Sascha Stegemann

30 October 2019 Second round	Borussia Dortmund	2–1	Borussia Mönchengladbach	Dortmund
20:45 CET (UTC+1)	Schulz (yellow card) 69'; Brandt 77', 80'	Report	Thuram 71'; Zakaria (yellow card) 83'; Neuhaus (yellow card) 90'; Rose (red card) 90+1'	Stadium: Signal Iduna Park; Attendance: 79,800; Referee: Benjamin Cortus

4 February 2020 Round of 16	Werder Bremen	3–2	Borussia Dortmund	Bremen
20:45 CET (UTC+1)	Selke 16'; Bittencourt (yellow card) 23', (goal) 30'; Rashica 70'; Moisander (yellow card) 85'	Report	Schulz (yellow card) 49'; Reus (yellow card) 64'; Haaland 67'; Reyna 78', (yellow card) 85'	Stadium: Weser-Stadion; Attendance: 42,100; Referee: Guido Winkmann

=== DFL-Supercup ===
3 August 2019 Final	Borussia Dortmund	2–0	Bayern Munich	Dortmund
20:30 CEST (UTC+2)	Alcácer 48'; Sancho 69'	Report	Lewandowski (yellow card) 59'; Kimmich (yellow card) 77'	Stadium: Signal Iduna Park; Attendance: 81,365; Referee: Daniel Siebert

=== UEFA Champions League ===
==== Group stage ====
Pos	Team	Pld	W	D	L	GF	GA	GD	Pts	Qualification	BAR	DOR	INT	SLP
1	(Spain) Barcelona	6	4	2	0	9	4	+5	14	Advance to knockout phase	—	3–1	2–1	0–0
2	(Germany) Borussia Dortmund	6	3	1	2	8	8	0	10	Advance to knockout phase	0–0	—	3–2	2–1
3	(Italy) Inter Milan	6	2	1	3	10	9	+1	7	Transfer to Europa League	1–2	2–0	—	1–1
4	(Czech Republic) Slavia Prague	6	0	2	4	4	10	−6	2		1–2	0–2	1–3	—

Source: UEFA
Rules for classification: Group stage tiebreakers

17 September 2019 1	Borussia Dortmund (Germany)	0–0	(Spain) Barcelona	Dortmund, Germany
21:00 CEST (UTC+2)	Delaney (yellow card) 15'; Hazard (yellow card) 47'	Report	Piqué (yellow card) 50'; Semedo (yellow card) 56'; Rakitić (yellow card) 70'	Stadium: Westfalenstadion; Attendance: 66,099; Referee: Ovidiu Haţegan (Romania)

2 October 2019 2	Slavia Prague (Czech Republic)	0–2	(Germany) Borussia Dortmund	Prague, Czech Republic
18:55 CEST (UTC+2)	Ševčík (yellow card) 45'; Hovorka (yellow card) 50'	Report	Piszczek (yellow card) 22'; Hakimi 35', 89'	Stadium: Sinobo Stadium; Attendance: 19,370; Referee: Björn Kuipers (Netherlands)

23 October 2019 3	Inter Milan (Italy)	2–0	(Germany) Borussia Dortmund	Milan, Italy
21:00 CEST (UTC+2)	Martínez 22'; Brozović (yellow card) 44'; Barella (yellow card) 56'; Godín (yellow card) 78'; Candreva 89', (yellow card) 90'	Report	Weigl (yellow card) 79'; Hummels (yellow card) 87'	Stadium: San Siro; Attendance: 65,673; Referee: Anthony Taylor (England)

5 November 2019 4	Borussia Dortmund (Germany)	3–2	(Italy) Inter Milan	Dortmund, Germany
21:00 CET (UTC+1)	Hakimi 51', 77'; Brandt 64'; Hazard (yellow card) 79'	Report	Biraghi (yellow card) 1'; Martínez 5'; Škriniar (yellow card) 30'; Vecino 40'; Candreva (yellow card) 49'	Stadium: Westfalenstadion; Attendance: 66,099; Referee: Danny Makkelie (Netherlands)

27 November 2019 5	Barcelona (Spain)	3–1	(Germany) Borussia Dortmund	Barcelona, Spain
21:00 CET (UTC+1)	Suárez 29'; Messi 33', (yellow card) 51'; Griezmann 67'; Busquets (yellow card) 71'	Report	Guerreiro (yellow card) 74'; Sancho 77'	Stadium: Camp Nou; Attendance: 90,071; Referee: Clément Turpin (France)

10 December 2019 6	Borussia Dortmund (Germany)	2–1	(Czech Republic) Slavia Prague	Dortmund, Germany
21:00 CET (UTC+1)	Sancho 10'; Brandt (yellow card) 38', (goal) 61'; Zagadou (yellow card) 49'; Weigl (yellow card) 66' (yellow-red card) 77'	Report	Bořil (yellow card) 42'; Souček 43'; Coufal (yellow card) 82'	Stadium: Westfalenstadion; Attendance: 65,079; Referee: Sergei Karasev (Russia)

==== Knockout phase ====
===== Round of 16 =====
18 February 2020 First leg	Borussia Dortmund (Germany)	2–1	(France) Paris Saint-Germain	Dortmund, Germany
21:00 CET (UTC+1)	Witsel (yellow card) 44'; Haaland 69', 77'	Report	Gueye (yellow card) 54'; Neymar (yellow card) 60', (goal) 75'; Meunier (yellow card) 87'; Verratti (yellow card) 89'	Stadium: Westfalenstadion; Attendance: 66,099; Referee: Antonio Mateu Lahoz (Spain)

11 March 2020 Second leg	Paris Saint-Germain (France)	2–0 (3–2 agg.)	(Germany) Borussia Dortmund	Paris, France
21:00 CET (UTC+1)	Neymar 28', (yellow card) 90'; Bernat 45+1', (yellow card) 68'; Marquinhos (yellow card) 90'; Di María (yellow card) 90'; Mbappé (yellow card) 90+3'	Report	Haaland (yellow card) 16'; Hummels (yellow card) 61'; Can (red card) 89'	Stadium: Parc des Princes; Attendance: 0 Referee: Anthony Taylor (England)

== Statistics ==
=== Appearances and goals ===
No.	Pos	Nat	Player	Total		Bundesliga		DFB-Pokal		Champions League		DFL-Supercup	
No.	Pos	Nat	Player	Apps	Goals	Apps	Goals	Apps	Goals	Apps	Goals	Apps	Goals
Goalkeepers
1	GK	(Switzerland) SUI	Roman Bürki	39	0	31	0	0	0	8	0	0	0
25	GK	(Germany) GER	Luca Unbehaun	0	0	0	0	0	0	0	0	0	0
35	GK	(Switzerland) SUI	Marwin Hitz	8	0	3+1	0	3	0	0	0	1	0
40	GK	(Germany) GER	Eric Oelschlägel	0	0	0	0	0	0	0	0	0	0
Defenders
2	DF	(France) FRA	Dan-Axel Zagadou	22	1	10+5	1	2	0	3+2	0	0	0
5	DF	(Morocco) MAR	Achraf Hakimi	45	9	29+4	5	1+2	0	8	4	0+1	0
13	DF	(Portugal) POR	Raphaël Guerreiro	38	8	26+3	8	0	0	6+2	0	1	0
14	DF	(Germany) GER	Nico Schulz	18	1	7+4	1	3	0	3	0	1	0
15	DF	(Germany) GER	Mats Hummels	41	1	31	1	2	0	8	0	0	0
16	DF	(Switzerland) SUI	Manuel Akanji	39	0	25+4	0	3	0	6	0	1	0
18	DF	(Argentina) ARG	Leonardo Balerdi	8	0	1+6	0	0	0	0+1	0	0	0
22	DF	(Spain) ESP	Mateu Morey	5	0	2+3	0	0	0	0	0	0	0
26	DF	(Poland) POL	Łukasz Piszczek	38	1	25+4	1	2	0	4+2	0	1	0
29	DF	(Germany) GER	Marcel Schmelzer	8	1	0+7	1	0	0	0+1	0	0	0
Midfielders
6	MF	(Denmark) DEN	Thomas Delaney	14	0	11	0	0	0	3	0	0	0
7	MF	(England) ENG	Jadon Sancho	44	20	25+7	17	3	0	7+1	2	1	1
8	MF	(Germany) GER	Mahmoud Dahoud	14	0	6+6	0	0	0	0+2	0	0	0
10	MF	(Germany) GER	Mario Götze	21	3	5+10	3	0+2	0	1+3	0	0	0
19	MF	(Germany) GER	Julian Brandt	42	7	25+8	3	2	2	5+2	2	0	0
23	MF	(Belgium) BEL	Thorgan Hazard	43	7	28+5	7	3	0	6+1	0	0	0
27	MF	(Germany) GER	Emre Can	15	2	10+2	2	0+1	0	2	0	0	0
28	MF	(Belgium) BEL	Axel Witsel	39	4	25+3	4	3	0	7	0	1	0
32	MF	(United States) USA	Giovanni Reyna	18	1	2+13	0	0+1	1	0+2	0	0	0
37	MF	(Germany) GER	Tobias Raschl	1	0	0+1	0	0	0	0	0	0	0
Forwards
11	FW	(Germany) GER	Marco Reus	26	12	18+1	11	2	1	4	0	1	0
17	FW	(Norway) NOR	Erling Haaland	18	16	11+4	13	0+1	1	2	2	0	0
Players transferred out during the season
9	FW	(Spain) ESP	Paco Alcácer	15	7	6+5	5	1	1	1+1	0	1	1
17	MF	(Spain) ESP	Sergio Gómez	0	0	0	0	0	0	0	0	0	0
20	FW	(Germany) GER	Maximilian Philipp	0	0	0	0	0	0	0	0	0	0
27	FW	(Germany) GER	Marius Wolf	1	0	0	0	0	0	0	0	0+1	0
32	MF	(Japan) JPN	Shinji Kagawa	0	0	0	0	0	0	0	0	0	0
33	MF	(Germany) GER	Julian Weigl	20	1	12+1	1	2	0	4	0	1	0
34	FW	(Denmark) DEN	Jacob Bruun Larsen	9	0	0+4	0	1+1	0	0+2	0	0+1	0
36	DF	(Turkey) TUR	Ömer Toprak	1	0	0	0	0	0	0	0	1	0

Last updated: 27 June 2020
Source: Competitions

=== Goalscorers ===
Rank	Pos	No.	Nat	Name	Bundesliga	DFB-Pokal	UEFA CL	DFL-Supercup	Total
1	MF	7	(England)	Jadon Sancho	17	0	2	1	20
2	FW	17	(Norway)	Erling Haaland	13	1	2	0	16
3	FW	11	(Germany)	Marco Reus	11	1	0	0	12
4	DF	5	(Morocco)	Achraf Hakimi	5	0	4	0	9
5	DF	13	(Portugal)	Raphaël Guerreiro	8	0	0	0	8
6	FW	9	(Spain)	Paco Alcácer	5	1	0	1	7
6	MF	23	(Belgium)	Thorgan Hazard	7	0	0	0	7
8	MF	19	(Germany)	Julian Brandt	3	2	2	0	6
9	MF	28	(Belgium)	Axel Witsel	4	0	0	0	4
10	MF	10	(Germany)	Mario Götze	3	0	0	0	3
11	MF	27	(Germany)	Emre Can	2	0	0	0	2
12	DF	2	(France)	Dan-Axel Zagadou	1	0	0	0	1
12	DF	14	(Germany)	Nico Schulz	1	0	0	0	1
12	DF	15	(Germany)	Mats Hummels	1	0	0	0	1
12	DF	26	(Poland)	Łukasz Piszczek	1	0	0	0	1
12	DF	29	(Germany)	Marcel Schmelzer	1	0	0	0	1
12	MF	32	(United States)	Giovanni Reyna	0	1	0	0	1
12	MF	33	(Germany)	Julian Weigl	1	0	0	0	1
Own goals					0	0	0	0	0
Totals					84	6	10	2	102

Last updated: 20 June 2020
