= 2017–18 Borussia Dortmund season =

109th season in existence of Borussia Dortmund

Borussia Dortmund
2017–18 season
- President: Reinhard Rauball
- Chairman: Hans-Joachim Watzke
- Head coach: Peter Bosz (until 10 December); Peter Stöger (from 10 December)
- Stadium: Signal Iduna Park
- Bundesliga: 4th
- DFB-Pokal: Round of 16
- DFL-Supercup: Runners-up
- UEFA Champions League: Group stage
- UEFA Europa League: Round of 16
- Top goalscorer: League: Pierre-Emerick Aubameyang (13); All: Pierre-Emerick Aubameyang (21)
- Highest home attendance: 81,360
- Lowest home attendance: 53,700
- Average home league attendance: 79,496
- Biggest win: Dortmund 5–0 Köln; Dortmund 6–1 Gladbach; Magdeburg 0–5 Dortmund
- Biggest defeat: Bayern 6–0 Dortmund
Home colours	Away colours	Third colours

The 2017–18 Borussia Dortmund season was the 109th season in the football club's history and 42nd consecutive and 51st overall season in the top flight of German football, the Bundesliga, having been promoted from the 2. Bundesliga Nord in 1976.

In addition to the domestic league, Borussia Dortmund also participated in this season's editions of the domestic cup, the DFB-Pokal, and the first-tier continental cup, the UEFA Champions League. Dortmund were the reigning DFB-Pokal champions, and therefore also participated in the German super cup, the DFL-Supercup. This was the 44th season for Dortmund in the Signal Iduna Park, located in Dortmund, North Rhine-Westphalia, Germany. The season covered a period from 1 July 2017 to 30 June 2018.

== Kit information ==
Supplier: Puma / Sponsor: Evonik Industries

Home	Home alt.	Home alt 2.	Away	Away alt.	Away alt 2.	Third	Europe + Cup

== Players ==
=== Squad information ===
As of 31 January 2018

Note: Flags indicate national team as defined under FIFA eligibility rules; some limited exceptions apply. Players may hold more than one non-FIFA nationality.

No.	Pos.	Nation	Player
1	GK	GER	Roman Weidenfeller
2	DF	FRA	Dan-Axel Zagadou
7	MF	ENG	Jadon Sancho
8	MF	TUR	Nuri Şahin
9	FW	UKR	Andriy Yarmolenko
10	MF	GER	Mario Götze
11	FW	GER	Marco Reus (vice-captain)
13	DF	POR	Raphaël Guerreiro
14	FW	SWE	Alexander Isak
15	DF	GER	Jeremy Toljan
16	DF	SUI	Manuel Akanji
18	MF	GER	Sebastian Rode
19	MF	GER	Mahmoud Dahoud
20	FW	GER	Maximilian Philipp

No.	Pos.	Nation	Player
21	FW	GER	André Schürrle
22	MF	USA	Christian Pulisic
23	MF	JPN	Shinji Kagawa
25	DF	GRE	Sokratis Papastathopoulos (3rd captain)
26	DF	POL	Łukasz Piszczek
27	MF	GER	Gonzalo Castro
29	DF	GER	Marcel Schmelzer (captain)
33	MF	GER	Julian Weigl
34	MF	ESP	Sergio Gómez
35	GK	GER	Dominik Reimann
36	DF	TUR	Ömer Toprak
37	DF	GER	Erik Durm
38	GK	SUI	Roman Bürki
44	FW	BEL	Michy Batshuayi (on loan from Chelsea)

=== Transfers ===
==== In ====
No.	Pos	Player	Age	From	Type	Window	Ends	Fee	Source
36	DF	(Turkey) Ömer Toprak	27	(Germany) Bayer Leverkusen	Transfer	Summer	2021	€12M	Borussia Dortmund
19	MF	(Germany) Mahmoud Dahoud	21	(Germany) Borussia Mönchengladbach	Transfer	Summer	2022	€12M	Borussia Dortmund
2	DF	(France) Dan-Axel Zagadou	18	(France) Paris Saint-Germain	Transfer	Summer	2022	Free transfer	Borussia Dortmund
20	MF	(Germany) Maximilian Philipp	23	(Germany) SC Freiburg	Transfer	Summer	2022	€20M	Borussia Dortmund
9	FW	(Ukraine) Andriy Yarmolenko	28	(Ukraine) Dynamo Kyiv	Transfer	Summer	2021	€30M	Borussia Dortmund
15	DF	(Germany) Jeremy Toljan	22	(Germany) 1899 Hoffenheim	Transfer	Summer	2022	€7M	Borussia Dortmund
7	FW	(England) Jadon Sancho	17	(England) Manchester City	Transfer	Summer	2020	€8M	Borussia Dortmund
16	DF	(Switzerland) Manuel Akanji	22	(Switzerland) Basel	Transfer	Winter	2022	€21.5M	Borussia Dortmund
34	FW	(Spain) Sergio Gómez	17	(Spain) Barcelona B	Transfer	Winter	2021	€3M	Borussia Dortmund
44	FW	(Belgium) Michy Batshuayi	24	(England) Chelsea	Loan	Winter	2018	€1.5M	Borussia Dortmund

==== Out ====
No.	Pos	Player	Age	To	Type	Window	Ends	Fee	Source
6	DF	(Germany) Sven Bender	28	(Germany) Bayer Leverkusen	Transfer	Summer	2021	€13M	Borussia Dortmund
9	MF	(Turkey) Emre Mor	20	(Spain) Celta Vigo	Transfer	Summer	2022	€13M	Celta de Vigo
28	DF	(Germany) Matthias Ginter	23	(Germany) Borussia Mönchengladbach	Transfer	Summer	2021	€17M	Borussia Mönchengladbach
7	FW	(France) Ousmane Dembélé	20	(Spain) Barcelona	Transfer	Summer	2022	€105M	FC Barcelona
30	DF	(Germany) Felix Passlack	19	(Germany) 1899 Hoffenheim	Loan	Summer	2019		1899 Hoffenheim
17	FW	(Gabon) Pierre-Emerick Aubameyang	28	(England) Arsenal	Transfer	Winter	2022	€63.75M	Arsenal
5	DF	(Spain) Marc Bartra	27	(Spain) Real Betis	Transfer	Winter	2023	€10.5M	Real Betis
4	DF	(Serbia) Neven Subotić	29	(France) Saint-Étienne	Transfer	Winter	2019	Free transfer	Saint-Étienne
34	FW	(Denmark) Jacob Bruun Larsen	19	(Germany) VfB Stuttgart	Loan	Winter	2018		VfB Stuttgart

== Friendly matches ==
Win Draw Loss

11 July 2017	Rot-Weiss Essen	3–2	Borussia Dortmund	Essen, Germany
19:00 CEST (UTC+2)	Baier 3', 40'; Platzek 61'	Report	Aubameyang 30'; Dembélé 63' (pen.)	Stadium: Stadion Essen; Attendance: 13,500; Referee: Sven Waschitzki (Germany)

15 July 2017 2017 J.League World Challenge	Urawa Red Diamonds	2–3	Borussia Dortmund	Saitama, Japan
18:10 JST (UTC+9); 12:10 CEST (UTC+2)	Koroki 24'; Endo 85'	Report	Mor 76', 79'; Schürrle 88'	Stadium: Saitama Stadium 2002; Attendance: 58,327; Referee: Hiroyuki Kimura (Japan)

18 July 2017 2017 ICC (China)	Milan	1–3	Borussia Dortmund	Guangzhou, China
19:20 CST (UTC+8); 13:20 CEST (UTC+2)	Bacca 24'	Report	Şahin 16'; Aubameyang 20' (pen.), 62'	Stadium: Guangzhou Higher Education Stadium; Attendance: 19,000; Referee: Zhang Lei (China)

22 July 2017	Bochum	2–2	Borussia Dortmund	Bochum, Germany
18:00 CEST (UTC+2)	Celozzi 39'; Losilla 55'	Report	Castro 85'; Pulisic 86'	Stadium: Ruhrstadion; Attendance: 24,000; Referee: Sören Storks (Germany)

28 July 2017	Borussia Dortmund	0–1	Espanyol	Winterthur, Switzerland
19:30 CEST (UTC+2)		Report	Piatti 80'	Stadium: Stadion Schützenwiese; Attendance: 9,400; Referee: Luca Gut (Switzerland)

1 August 2017	Borussia Dortmund	0–1	Atalanta	Altach, Austria
19:30 CEST (UTC+2)		Report	Iličić 71'	Stadium: Stadion Schnabelholz; Attendance: 6,071; Referee: Robert Schörgenhofer (Austria)

6 August 2017	Rot-Weiß Erfurt	2–5	Borussia Dortmund	Erfurt, Germany
17:00 CEST (UTC+2)	Lauberbach 12'; Huth 40'	Report	Isak 18', 51', 61', 88'; Beste 21'	Stadium: Steigerwaldstadion; Attendance: 14,588; Referee: Oliver Lossius (Germany)

6 January 2018	Fortuna Düsseldorf	0–2	Borussia Dortmund	La Línea, Spain
17:00 CET (UTC+1)		Report	Isak 71'; Shinji 84'	Stadium: Estadio Municipal de La Línea de la Concepción; Attendance: 1,000; Referee: Alberto Sevillano (Spain)

8 January 2018	Borussia Dortmund	3–2	Zulte-Waregem	Marbella, Spain
16:00 CET (UTC+1)	Piszczek 29'; Aubameyang 42', 54'	Report	Harbaoui 23'; Derijck 33'	Stadium: Estadio Municipal de Marbella; Attendance: 300; Referee: José Aranda (Spain)

14 May 2018	Zwickau	4–4	Borussia Dortmund	Zwickau, Germany
19:00 CEST (UTC+2)	Tekerci 34', 45'; Öztürk 71'; Gremsl 76'	Report	Gómez 17'; Yarmolenko 59'; Pulisic 77'; Isak 81'	Stadium: Stadion Zwickau; Attendance: 10,134; Referee: Alexander Sather (Germany)

22 May 2018	Los Angeles FC	1–1	Borussia Dortmund	Los Angeles, United States
22:00 EDT (UTC-4); 04:00 CEST (UTC+2)	Kovar 77'	Report	Philipp 87'	Stadium: Banc of California Stadium; Attendance: 22,000; Referee: Baldomero Toledo (United States)

== Competitions ==
Win Draw Loss

=== Overview ===
Competition	First match	Last match	Starting round	Final position	Record							
Competition	First match	Last match	Starting round	Final position	Pld	W	D	L	GF	GA	GD	Win %
Bundesliga	19 August 2017	12 May 2018	Matchday 1	4th	34	15	10	9	64	47	+17	44.12
DFB-Pokal	12 August 2017	20 December 2017	First round	Round of 16	3	2	0	1	10	2	+8	66.67
DFL-Supercup	5 August 2017		Final	Runners-up	1	0	1	0	2	2	+0	0.00
Champions League	13 September 2017	6 December 2017	Group stage	Group stage	6	0	2	4	7	13	−6	0.00
Europa League	15 February 2018	15 March 2018	Round of 32	Round of 16	4	1	2	1	5	5	+0	25.00
Total					48	18	15	15	88	69	+19	37.50

Last updated: 21 May 2018
Source: Competitions

=== Bundesliga ===
==== League table ====
Pos	Team	Pld	W	D	L	GF	GA	GD	Pts	Qualification or relegation
2	Schalke 04	34	18	9	7	53	37	+16	63	Qualification for the Champions League group stage
3	1899 Hoffenheim	34	15	10	9	66	48	+18	55	Qualification for the Champions League group stage
4	Borussia Dortmund	34	15	10	9	64	47	+17	55	Qualification for the Champions League group stage
5	Bayer Leverkusen	34	15	10	9	58	44	+14	55	Qualification for the Europa League group stage
6	RB Leipzig	34	15	8	11	57	53	+4	53	Qualification for the Europa League second qualifying round

Source: DFB
Rules for classification: 1) Points; 2) Goal difference; 3) Goals scored; 4) Head-to-head results; 5) Head-to-head away goals scored; 6) Away goals scored; 7) Play-off.

==== Results summary ====
Overall								Home						Away					
Pld	W	D	L	GF	GA	GD	Pts	W	D	L	GF	GA	GD	W	D	L	GF	GA	GD
34	15	10	9	64	47	+17	55	9	4	4	40	21	+19	6	6	5	24	26	−2

Last updated: 21 May 2018.
Source: Bundesliga

==== Results by round ====
Round	1	2	3	4	5	6	7	8	9	10	11	12	13	14	15	16	17	18	19	20	21	22	23	24	25	26	27	28	29	30	31	32	33	34
Ground	A	H	A	H	A	H	A	H	A	A	H	A	H	A	H	A	H	H	A	H	A	H	A	H	A	H	H	A	H	A	H	A	H	A
Result	W	W	D	W	W	W	W	L	D	L	L	L	D	D	L	W	W	D	D	D	W	W	W	D	D	W	W	L	W	L	W	D	L	L
Position	1	1	1	1	1	1	1	1	1	2	3	5	5	6	8	6	3	4	6	6	4	3	2	2	3	3	3	3	3	4	3	3	3	4

Updated to match(es) played on 21 May 2018. Source: Bundesliga
A = Away; H = Home; W = Win; D = Draw; L = Loss

==== Matches ====
19 August 2017 1	VfL Wolfsburg	0–3	Borussia Dortmund	Wolfsburg
15:30 CEST (UTC+2)		Report	Pulisic 22'; Bartra 27'; Aubameyang 60'	Stadium: Volkswagen Arena; Attendance: 30,000; Referee: Robert Hartmann

26 August 2017 2	Borussia Dortmund	2–0	Hertha BSC	Dortmund
18:30 CEST (UTC+2)	Aubameyang 15'; Şahin 57'	Report		Stadium: Signal Iduna Park; Attendance: 80,860; Referee: Marco Fritz

9 September 2017 3	SC Freiburg	0–0	Borussia Dortmund	Freiburg
15:30 CEST (UTC+2)		Report		Stadium: Schwarzwald-Stadion; Attendance: 24,000; Referee: Benjamin Cortus

17 September 2017 4	Borussia Dortmund	5–0	1. FC Köln	Dortmund
18:00 CEST (UTC+2)	Philipp 2', 69'; Papastathopoulos 45+1'; Aubameyang 59' (pen.), 60'	Report		Stadium: Signal Iduna Park; Attendance: 81,000; Referee: Patrick Ittrich

20 September 2017 5	Hamburger SV	0–3	Borussia Dortmund	Hamburg
20:30 CEST (UTC+2)		Report	Kagawa 24'; Aubameyang 63'; Pulisic 79'	Stadium: Volksparkstadion; Attendance: 52,962; Referee: Felix Zwayer

23 September 2017 6	Borussia Dortmund	6–1	Borussia Mönchengladbach	Dortmund
18:30 CEST (UTC+2)	Philipp 28', 38'; Aubameyang 45', 49', 62'; Weigl 79'	Report	Stindl 66'	Stadium: Signal Iduna Park; Attendance: 81,360; Referee: Manuel Gräfe

30 September 2017 7	FC Augsburg	1–2	Borussia Dortmund	Augsburg
15:30 CEST (UTC+2)	Caiuby 11'	Report	Yarmolenko 4'; Kagawa 23'	Stadium: WWK Arena; Attendance: 30,660; Referee: Marco Fritz

14 October 2017 8	Borussia Dortmund	2–3	RB Leipzig	Dortmund
18:30 CEST (UTC+2)	Aubameyang 4', 64' (pen.)	Report	Sabitzer 10'; Poulsen 25'; Augustin 49' (pen.)	Stadium: Signal Iduna Park; Attendance: 80,100; Referee: Deniz Aytekin

21 October 2017 9	Eintracht Frankfurt	2–2	Borussia Dortmund	Frankfurt
15:30 CEST (UTC+2)	Haller 64' (pen.); Wolf 68'	Report	Şahin 18'; Philipp 57'	Stadium: Commerzbank-Arena; Attendance: 51,500; Referee: Robert Hartmann

28 October 2017 10	Hannover 96	4–2	Borussia Dortmund	Hanover
15:30 CEST (UTC+2)	Jonathas 20' (pen.); Bebou 40', 86'; Klaus 60'	Report	Zagadou 27'; Yarmolenko 52'	Stadium: HDI-Arena; Attendance: 49,000; Referee: Patrick Ittrich

4 November 2017 11	Borussia Dortmund	1–3	Bayern Munich	Dortmund
18:30 CET (UTC+1)	Bartra 88'	Report	Robben 17'; Lewandowski 37'; Alaba 67'	Stadium: Signal Iduna Park; Attendance: 81,360; Referee: Tobias Stieler

17 November 2017 12	VfB Stuttgart	2–1	Borussia Dortmund	Stuttgart
20:30 CET (UTC+1)	Akolo 5'; Brekalo 51'	Report	Philipp 45+3'	Stadium: Mercedes-Benz Arena; Attendance: 58,932; Referee: Frank Willenborg

25 November 2017 13	Borussia Dortmund	4–4	Schalke 04	Dortmund
15:30 CET (UTC+1)	Aubameyang 12'; Stambouli 18' (o.g.); Götze 20'; Guerreiro 25'	Report	Burgstaller 61'; Harit 65'; Caligiuri 86'; Naldo 90+4'	Stadium: Signal Iduna Park; Attendance: 80,179; Referee: Deniz Aytekin

2 December 2017 14	Bayer Leverkusen	1–1	Borussia Dortmund	Leverkusen
15:30 CET (UTC+1)	Volland 30'	Report	Yarmolenko 73'	Stadium: BayArena; Attendance: 30,210; Referee: Robert Hartmann

9 December 2017 15	Borussia Dortmund	1–2	Werder Bremen	Dortmund
15:30 CET (UTC+1)	Aubameyang 57'	Report	M. Eggestein 26'; Gebre Selassie 65'	Stadium: Signal Iduna Park; Attendance: 81,160; Referee: Manuel Gräfe

12 December 2017 16	Mainz 05	0–2	Borussia Dortmund	Mainz
20:30 CET (UTC+1)		Report	Papastathopoulos 55'; Kagawa 89'	Stadium: Opel Arena; Attendance: 32,976; Referee: Benjamin Brand

16 December 2017 17	Borussia Dortmund	2–1	1899 Hoffenheim	Dortmund
18:30 CET (UTC+1)	Aubameyang 63' (pen.); Pulisic 89'	Report	Uth 21'	Stadium: Signal Iduna Park; Attendance: 81,000; Referee: Harm Osmers

14 January 2018 18	Borussia Dortmund	0–0	VfL Wolfsburg	Dortmund
18:00 CET (UTC+1)		Report		Stadium: Signal Iduna Park; Attendance: 80,600; Referee: Tobias Stieler

19 January 2018 19	Hertha BSC	1–1	Borussia Dortmund	Berlin
20:30 CET (UTC+1)	Selke 46'	Report	Kagawa 71'	Stadium: Olympiastadion Berlin; Attendance: 65,893; Referee: Christian Dingert

27 January 2018 20	Borussia Dortmund	2–2	SC Freiburg	Dortmund
15:30 CET (UTC+1)	Kagawa 9'; Toljan 90+3'	Report	Petersen 21', 68'	Stadium: Signal Iduna Park; Attendance: 81,360; Referee: Daniel Siebert

2 February 2018 21	1. FC Köln	2–3	Borussia Dortmund	Cologne
20:30 CET (UTC+1)	Zoller 60'; Meré 69'	Report	Batshuayi 35', 62'; Schürrle 84'	Stadium: RheinEnergieStadion; Attendance: 50,000; Referee: Benjamin Brand

10 February 2018 22	Borussia Dortmund	2–0	Hamburger SV	Dortmund
15:30 CET (UTC+1)	Batshuayi 49'; Götze 90+2'	Report		Stadium: Signal Iduna Park; Attendance: 81,360; Referee: Marco Fritz

18 February 2018 23	Borussia Mönchengladbach	0–1	Borussia Dortmund	Mönchengladbach
18:00 CET (UTC+1)		Report	Reus 32'	Stadium: Borussia-Park; Attendance: 54,018; Referee: Bastian Dankert

26 February 2018 24	Borussia Dortmund	1–1	FC Augsburg	Dortmund
20:30 CET (UTC+1)	Reus 16'	Report	Danso 73'	Stadium: Signal Iduna Park; Attendance: 54,300; Referee: Manuel Gräfe

3 March 2018 25	RB Leipzig	1–1	Borussia Dortmund	Leipzig
18:30 CET (UTC+1)	Augustin 29'	Report	Reus 38'	Stadium: Red Bull Arena; Attendance: 42,558; Referee: Felix Brych

11 March 2018 26	Borussia Dortmund	3–2	Eintracht Frankfurt	Dortmund
18:00 CET (UTC+1)	Russ 11' (o.g.); Batshuayi 77', 90+4'	Report	Jović 75'; Blum 90+1'	Stadium: Signal Iduna Park; Attendance: 81,360; Referee: Deniz Aytekin

18 March 2018 27	Borussia Dortmund	1–0	Hannover 96	Dortmund
13:30 CET (UTC+1)	Batshuayi 24'	Report		Stadium: Signal Iduna Park; Attendance: 81,360; Referee: Patrick Ittrich

31 March 2018 28	Bayern Munich	6–0	Borussia Dortmund	Munich
18:30 CEST (UTC+2)	Lewandowski 5', 44', 87'; Rodríguez 14'; Müller 23'; Ribéry 45+1'	Report		Stadium: Allianz Arena; Attendance: 75,000; Referee: Bastian Dankert

8 April 2018 29	Borussia Dortmund	3–0	VfB Stuttgart	Dortmund
15:30 CEST (UTC+2)	Pulisic 38'; Batshuayi 48'; Philipp 59'	Report		Stadium: Signal Iduna Park; Attendance: 81,360; Referee: Patrick Ittrich

15 April 2018 30	Schalke 04	2–0	Borussia Dortmund	Gelsenkirchen
15:30 CEST (UTC+2)	Konoplyanka 50'; Naldo 82'	Report		Stadium: Veltins-Arena; Attendance: 61,786; Referee: Manuel Gräfe

21 April 2018 31	Borussia Dortmund	4–0	Bayer Leverkusen	Dortmund
18:30 CEST (UTC+2)	Sancho 13'; Reus 55', 79'; Philipp 63'	Report		Stadium: Signal Iduna Park; Attendance: 81,360; Referee: Markus Schmidt

29 April 2018 32	Werder Bremen	1–1	Borussia Dortmund	Bremen
18:00 CEST (UTC+2)	Delaney 45'	Report	Reus 19'	Stadium: Weser-Stadion; Attendance: 41,000; Referee: Felix Brych

5 May 2018 33	Borussia Dortmund	1–2	Mainz 05	Dortmund
15:30 CEST (UTC+2)	Philipp 16'	Report	Baku 4'; Mutō 13'	Stadium: Signal Iduna Park; Attendance: 81,360; Referee: Daniel Siebert

12 May 2018 34	1899 Hoffenheim	3–1	Borussia Dortmund	Sinsheim
15:30 CEST (UTC+2)	Kramarić 26'; Szalai 63'; Kadeřábek 73'	Report	Reus 58'	Stadium: Wirsol Rhein-Neckar-Arena; Attendance: 30,150; Referee: Manuel Gräfe

=== DFB-Pokal ===
12 August 2017 First round	1. FC Rielasingen-Arlen	0–4	Borussia Dortmund	Freiburg
15:30 CEST (UTC+2)		Report	Bartra 12'; Aubameyang 41' (pen.), 55', 80'	Stadium: Schwarzwald-Stadion; Attendance: 24,000; Referee: Christian Dietz

24 October 2017 Second round	1. FC Magdeburg	0–5	Borussia Dortmund	Magdeburg
20:45 CEST (UTC+2)		Report	Castro 42'; Isak 47'; Yarmolenko 73' (pen.); Bartra 79'; Kagawa 90'	Stadium: MDCC-Arena; Attendance: 23,102; Referee: Daniel Siebert

20 December 2017 Round of 16	Bayern Munich	2–1	Borussia Dortmund	Munich
20:45 CET (UTC+1)	Boateng 12'; Müller 40'	Report	Yarmolenko 77'	Stadium: Allianz Arena; Attendance: 75,000; Referee: Sascha Stegemann

=== DFL-Supercup ===
5 August 2017 Final	Borussia Dortmund	2–2 (4–5 p)	Bayern Munich	Dortmund
20:30 CEST (UTC+2)	Pulisic 12'; Aubameyang 71'	Report	Lewandowski 18'; Bürki 88' (o.g.)	Stadium: Signal Iduna Park; Attendance: 81,360; Referee: Felix Zwayer
	Penalties
	Dembélé (penalty scored); Philipp (penalty scored); Aubameyang (penalty scored); Rode (penalty missed); Castro (penalty scored); Bartra (penalty missed)		(penalty scored) Lewandowski; (penalty scored) Ribéry; (penalty missed) Kimmich; (penalty scored) Rudy; (penalty scored) Vidal; (penalty scored) Süle

=== UEFA Champions League ===
==== Group stage ====
Pos	Team	Pld	W	D	L	GF	GA	GD	Pts	Qualification	TOT	RMA	DOR	APO
1	(England) Tottenham Hotspur	6	5	1	0	15	4	+11	16	Advance to knockout phase	—	3–1	3–1	3–0
2	(Spain) Real Madrid	6	4	1	1	17	7	+10	13	Advance to knockout phase	1–1	—	3–2	3–0
3	(Germany) Borussia Dortmund	6	0	2	4	7	13	−6	2 (Note: Head-to-head results: APOEL 1–1 Borussia Dortmund, Borussia Dortmund 1–1 APOEL (tied on head-to-head results, ranked on total goal difference).)	Transfer to Europa League	1–2	1–3	—	1–1
4	(Cyprus) APOEL	6	0	2	4	2	17	−15	2		0–3	0–6	1–1	—

Source: UEFA
Rules for classification: Group stage tiebreakers
Notes:

13 September 2017 1	Tottenham Hotspur (England)	3–1	(Germany) Borussia Dortmund	London, England
19:45 BST (UTC+1); 20:45 CEST (UTC+2)	Son 4'; Kane 15', 60'	Report	Yarmolenko 11'	Stadium: Wembley Stadium; Attendance: 67,343; Referee: Gianluca Rocchi (Italy)

26 September 2017 2	Borussia Dortmund (Germany)	1–3	(Spain) Real Madrid	Dortmund, Germany
20:45 CEST (UTC+2)	Aubameyang 54'	Report	Bale 18'; Ronaldo 50', 79'	Stadium: Signal Iduna Park; Attendance: 65,849; Referee: Björn Kuipers (Netherlands)

17 October 2017 3	APOEL (Cyprus)	1–1	(Germany) Borussia Dortmund	Nicosia, Cyprus
21:45 EEST (UTC+3); 20:45 CEST (UTC+2)	Poté 62'	Report	Papastathopoulos 67'	Stadium: GSP Stadium; Attendance: 15,604; Referee: Aleksei Kulbakov (Belarus)

1 November 2017 4	Borussia Dortmund (Germany)	1–1	(Cyprus) APOEL	Dortmund, Germany
20:45 CET (UTC+1)	Guerreiro 29'	Report	Poté 51'	Stadium: Signal Iduna Park; Attendance: 64,500; Referee: Matej Jug (Slovenia)

21 November 2017 5	Borussia Dortmund (Germany)	1–2	(England) Tottenham Hotspur	Dortmund, Germany
20:45 CET (UTC+1)	Aubameyang 31'	Report	Kane 49'; Son 76'	Stadium: Signal Iduna Park; Attendance: 65,849; Referee: Clément Turpin (France)

6 December 2017 6	Real Madrid (Spain)	3–2	(Germany) Borussia Dortmund	Madrid, Spain
20:45 CET (UTC+1)	Mayoral 8'; Ronaldo 12'; Vázquez 81'	Report	Aubameyang 43', 49'	Stadium: Santiago Bernabéu; Attendance: 73,323; Referee: Pavel Královec (Czech Republic)

=== UEFA Europa League ===
==== Knockout phase ====
===== Round of 32 =====
15 February 2018 First leg	Borussia Dortmund (Germany)	3–2	(Italy) Atalanta	Dortmund, Germany
19:00 CET (UTC+1)	Schürrle 30'; Batshuayi 65', 90+1'	Report	Iličić 51', 56'	Stadium: Signal Iduna Park; Attendance: 62,500; Referee: Daniel Stefański (Poland)

22 February 2018 Second leg	Atalanta (Italy)	1–1 (3–4 agg.)	(Germany) Borussia Dortmund	Reggio Emilia, Italy
21:05 CET (UTC+1)	Tolói 11'	Report	Schmelzer 83'	Stadium: Mapei Stadium – Città del Tricolore; Attendance: 17,492; Referee: Jesús Gil Manzano (Spain)

===== Round of 16 =====
8 March 2018 First leg	Borussia Dortmund (Germany)	1–2	(Austria) Red Bull Salzburg	Dortmund, Germany
19:00 CET (UTC+1)	Schürrle 62'	Report	Berisha 49' (pen.), 56'	Stadium: Signal Iduna Park; Attendance: 53,700; Referee: Slavko Vinčić (Slovenia)

15 March 2018 Second leg	Red Bull Salzburg (Austria)	0–0 (2–1 agg.)	(Germany) Borussia Dortmund	Wals-Siezenheim, Austria
21:05 CET (UTC+1)		Report		Stadium: Red Bull Arena; Attendance: 29,520; Referee: Benoît Bastien (France)

== Statistics ==
=== Appearances and goals ===
No.	Pos	Nat	Player	Total		Bundesliga		DFB-Pokal		Champions League		Europa League		DFL-Supercup	
No.	Pos	Nat	Player	Apps	Goals	Apps	Goals	Apps	Goals	Apps	Goals	Apps	Goals	Apps	Goals
Goalkeepers
1	GK	(Germany) GER	Roman Weidenfeller	2	0	1	0	0	0	0+1	0	0	0	0	0
35	GK	(Germany) GER	Dominik Reimann	0	0	0	0	0	0	0	0	0	0	0	0
38	GK	(Switzerland) SUI	Roman Bürki	46	0	32	0	3	0	6	0	4	0	1	0
Defenders
2	DF	(France) FRA	Dan-Axel Zagadou	16	1	6+5	1	1	0	1+1	0	1	0	1	0
13	DF	(Portugal) POR	Raphaël Guerreiro	14	2	5+3	1	1+1	0	3	1	0+1	0	0	0
15	DF	(Germany) GER	Jeremy Toljan	23	1	13+3	1	1	0	3+1	0	2	0	0	0
16	DF	(Switzerland) SUI	Manuel Akanji	10	0	9+1	0	0	0	0	0	0	0	0	0
24	DF	(Germany) GER	Jan-Niklas Beste	1	0	0	0	1	0	0	0	0	0	0	0
25	DF	(Greece) GRE	Sokratis Papastathopoulos	43	3	28+2	2	3	0	5	1	4	0	1	0
26	DF	(Poland) POL	Łukasz Piszczek	30	0	23	0	1	0	2	0	3	0	1	0
29	DF	(Germany) GER	Marcel Schmelzer	26	1	16+1	0	2	0	3+1	0	2+1	1	0	0
36	DF	(Turkey) TUR	Ömer Toprak	36	0	22+4	0	1	0	4+2	0	3	0	0	0
37	DF	(Germany) GER	Erik Durm	0	0	0	0	0	0	0	0	0	0	0	0
Midfielders
8	MF	(Turkey) TUR	Nuri Şahin	24	2	13+4	2	2	0	3	0	1	0	1	0
10	MF	(Germany) GER	Mario Götze	32	2	19+4	2	0	0	4+1	0	3+1	0	0	0
18	MF	(Germany) GER	Sebastian Rode	1	0	0	0	0	0	0	0	0	0	0+1	0
19	MF	(Germany) GER	Mahmoud Dahoud	34	0	11+12	0	2+1	0	2+1	0	3+1	0	1	0
22	MF	(United States) USA	Christian Pulisic	41	5	26+5	4	1	0	4+1	0	2+1	0	1	1
23	MF	(Japan) JPN	Shinji Kagawa	26	6	12+6	5	3	1	5	0	0	0	0	0
27	MF	(Germany) GER	Gonzalo Castro	28	1	16+3	0	1+1	1	1+2	0	3	0	1	0
33	MF	(Germany) GER	Julian Weigl	32	1	19+5	1	1	0	3+2	0	2	0	0	0
34	MF	(Spain) ESP	Sergio Gómez	2	0	0+2	0	0	0	0	0	0	0	0	0
Forwards
7	FW	(England) ENG	Jadon Sancho	11	1	6+5	1	0	0	0	0	0	0	0	0
9	FW	(Ukraine) UKR	Andriy Yarmolenko	26	6	13+5	3	2	2	4+2	1	0	0	0	0
11	FW	(Germany) GER	Marco Reus	14	6	10	6	0	0	0	0	3+1	0	0	0
14	FW	(Sweden) SWE	Alexander Isak	12	1	1+4	0	2+1	1	0+1	0	0+3	0	0	0
20	FW	(Germany) GER	Maximilian Philipp	28	9	15+5	9	2	0	2+1	0	0+2	0	0+1	0
21	FW	(Germany) GER	André Schürrle	25	3	10+7	1	1+2	0	0+1	0	4	2	0	0
44 (Note: Batshuayi wears the number 42 in the Europa League, as the number 44 was already registered to Till Schumacher.)	FW	(Belgium) BEL	Michy Batshuayi	14	9	9+1	7	0	0	0	0	4	2	0	0
Players transferred out during the season
4	DF	(Serbia) SRB	Neven Subotić	5	0	3+1	0	0	0	1	0	0	0	0	0
5	DF	(Spain) ESP	Marc Bartra	20	4	9+3	2	3	2	4	0	0	0	1	0
7	FW	(France) FRA	Ousmane Dembélé	1	0	0	0	0	0	0	0	0	0	1	0
17	FW	(Gabon) GAB	Pierre-Emerick Aubameyang	24	21	16	13	1	3	6	4	0	0	1	1
30	MF	(Germany) GER	Felix Passlack	3	0	0+1	0	0+1	0	0	0	0	0	0+1	0
34	MF	(Denmark) DEN	Jacob Larsen	1	0	0+1	0	0	0	0	0	0	0	0	0

Last updated: 27 May 2017
Source: Competitions

=== Goalscorers ===
As of 5 May 2018

Rank	Position	Name	Bundesliga	DFB-Pokal	DFL-Supercup	Champions League	Europa League	Total
1	FW	(Gabon) Pierre-Emerick Aubameyang	13	3	1	4	0	21
2	FW	(Germany) Maximilian Philipp	9	0	0	0	0	9
2	FW	(Belgium) Michy Batshuayi	7	0	0	0	2	9
4	MF	(Japan) Shinji Kagawa	5	1	0	0	0	6
4	MF	(Germany) Marco Reus	6	0	0	0	0	6
4	FW	(Ukraine) Andriy Yarmolenko	3	2	0	1	0	6
7	MF	(United States) Christian Pulisic	4	0	1	0	0	5
8	DF	(Spain) Marc Bartra	2	2	0	0	0	4
9	DF	(Greece) Sokratis Papastathopoulos	2	0	0	1	0	3
9	MF	(Germany) André Schürrle	1	0	0	0	2	3
11	DF	(Portugal) Raphaël Guerreiro	1	0	0	1	0	2
11	MF	(Germany) Mario Götze	2	0	0	0	0	2
11	MF	(Turkey) Nuri Şahin	2	0	0	0	0	2
14	DF	(Germany) Marcel Schmelzer	0	0	0	0	1	1
14	DF	(Germany) Jeremy Toljan	1	0	0	0	0	1
14	DF	(France) Dan-Axel Zagadou	1	0	0	0	0	1
14	MF	(Germany) Gonzalo Castro	0	1	0	0	0	1
14	MF	(England) Jadon Sancho	1	0	0	0	0	1
14	MF	(Germany) Julian Weigl	1	0	0	0	0	1
14	FW	(Sweden) Alexander Isak	0	1	0	0	0	1
Own goal			2	0	0	0	0	2
Total			63	10	2	7	5	87

=== Clean sheets ===
Rank	No.	Pos	Nat	Name	Bundesliga	DFB-Pokal	DFL-Supercup	Champions League	Europa League	Total
1	38	GK	(Switzerland)	Roman Bürki	12	2	0	0	1	15
Totals					12	2	0	0	1	15

Last updated: 5 May 2018
