= Gian Luca Schulz =

German footballer

Personal information
- Date of birth: 14 January 1999 (age 27)
- Place of birth: Berlin, Germany
- Height: 1.80 m (5 ft 11 in)
- Positions: Right winger; attacking midfielder

Team information
- Current team: SV Babelsberg 03
- Number: 24

Youth career
- –2016: Tennis Borussia Berlin
- 2016–2018: Union Berlin

Senior career*
Years	Team	Apps	(Gls)
2018–2020	Union Fürstenwalde	51	(10)
2020–2022	Hansa Rostock	5	(0)
2020–2023	Hansa Rostock II	11	(3)
2021–2022	→ Energie Cottbus (loan)	19	(0)
2023–	SV Babelsberg 03	37	(3)
- * Club domestic league appearances and goals as of 22 June 2026

Gian Luca Schulz (German: ['dʒan ˈlu.ka ˈʃʊlts]; born 14 January 1999) is a German professional footballer who plays as a right winger or attacking midfielder for SV Babelsberg 03.

== Early life ==
Schulz was born in Berlin.

== Career ==
After playing youth football for Tennis Borussia Berlin and Union Berlin, and senior football for Union Fürstenwalde in the Regionalliga Nordost, he joined Hansa Rostock on a two-year contract in July 2020.

== Personal life ==
He is the brother of fellow professional footballer and German international Nico Schulz. He is eligible to represent Italy internationally through his father.
