= Julian Weigl =

German footballer (born 1995)

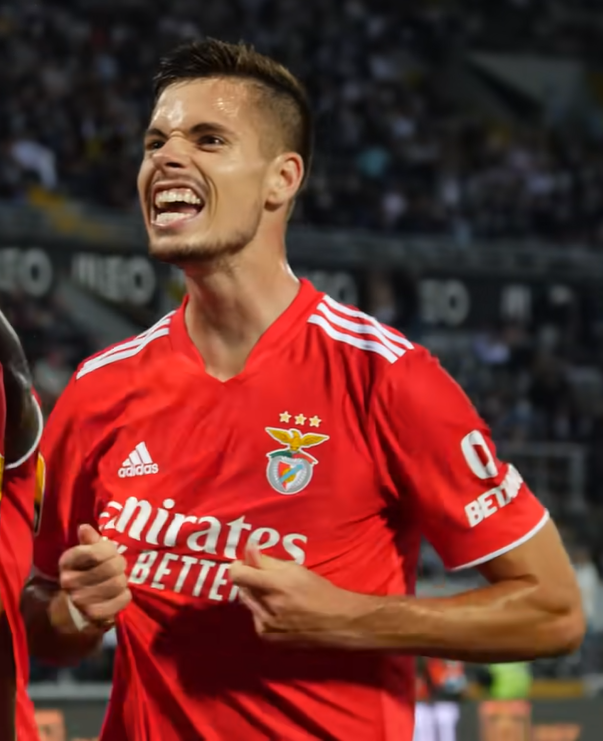
- Weigl with Benfica in 2021

Personal information
- Full name: Julian Weigl
- Date of birth: 8 September 1995 (age 31)
- Place of birth: Bad Aibling, Germany
- Height: 1.86 m (6 ft 1 in)
- Position: Defensive midfielder

Team information
- Current team: Al-Qadsiah
- Number: 5

Youth career
- 2001–2006: SV Ostermünchen
- 2006–2010: 1860 Rosenheim
- 2010–2013: 1860 Munich

Senior career*
Years	Team	Apps	(Gls)
2013–2014	1860 Munich II	23	(0)
2014–2015	1860 Munich	38	(0)
2015–2020	Borussia Dortmund	116	(3)
2020–2023	Benfica	77	(3)
2022–2023	→ Borussia Mönchengladbach (loan)	23	(1)
2023–2025	Borussia Mönchengladbach	64	(2)
2025–	Al-Qadsiah	34	(1)

International career^{‡}
2013–2014	Germany U19	4	(0)
2014–2015	Germany U20	7	(1)
2015–2016	Germany U21	5	(0)
2016–2022	Germany	6	(0)
- * Club domestic league appearances and goals as of 23:43, 20 October 2026 (UTC) ‡ National team caps and goals as of 21:39, 26 March 2022 (UTC)

Julian Weigl (born 8 September 1995) is a German professional footballer who plays as a defensive midfielder for Saudi Pro League club Al-Qadsiah. He has also represented the Germany national team.

== Club career ==
=== 1860 Munich ===
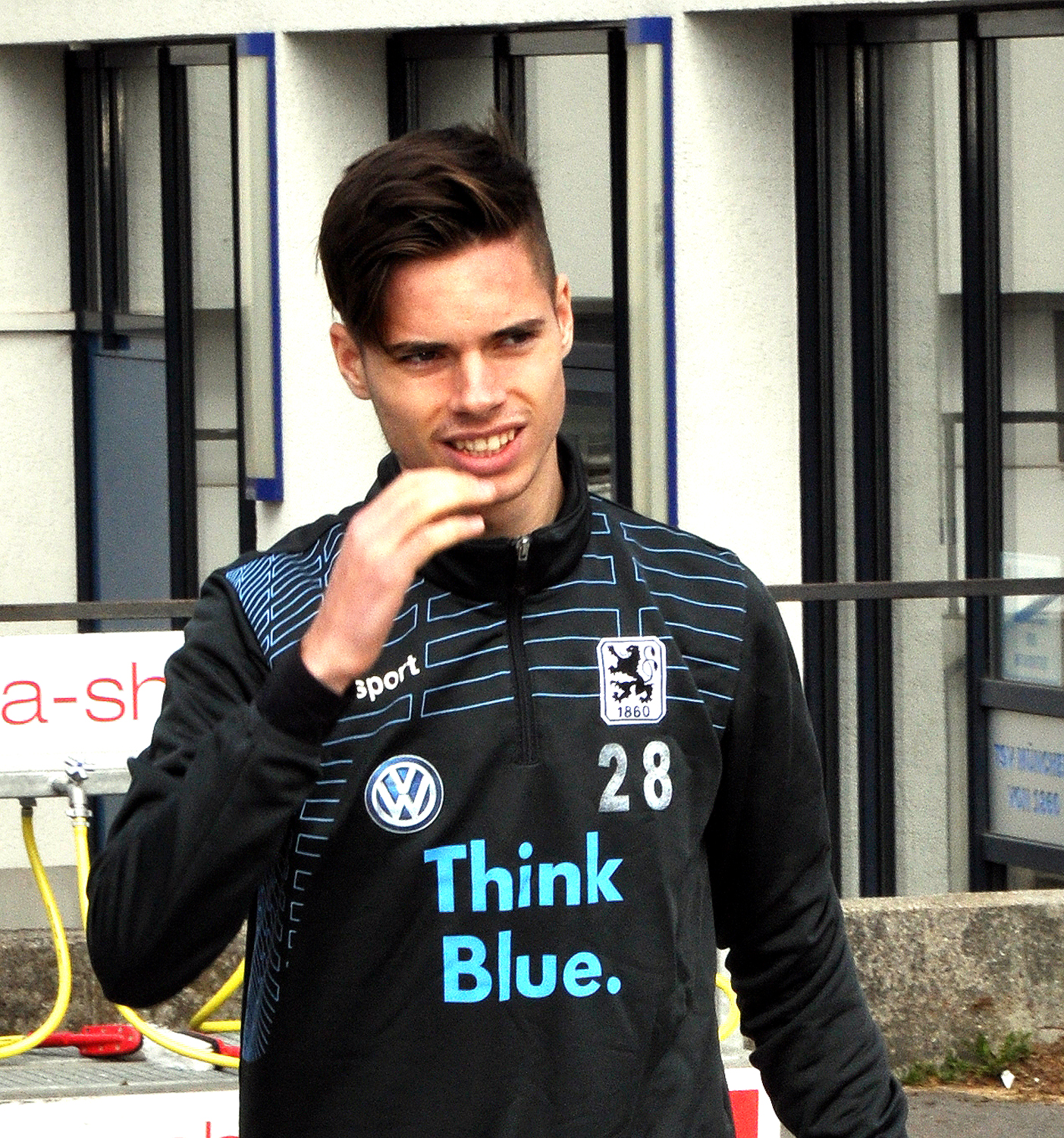
Weigl with 1860 Munich in 2015

Weigl is a youth export from 1860 Munich. He made his 2. Bundesliga debut at 14 February 2014 against Ingolstadt 04. He replaced Yannick Stark after 66 minutes in a 2–0 away defeat. He managed to play 14 league games in his first season with TSV's first team. In the first match of the 2014–15 season against Kaiserslautern. Weigl, being only 18 years old, was named captain. He is therefore the youngest captain in the history of 1860 Munich. After the second match of the season Weigl was fined and suspended to the second squad along with his teammates Vitus Eicher, Daniel Adlung and Yannick Stark. The four players had been out drinking late at night and were overheard talking negatively about the club. Weigl was relieved of the captaincy and succeeded by Christopher Schindler.

=== Borussia Dortmund ===
After the 2014–15 season, Weigl transferred to Borussia Dortmund, where he signed a contract until 2019. Julian Weigl made his official Dortmund debut on Saturday 15 August 2015 in a 4–0 home victory against Borussia Mönchengladbach. He made his Europa League debut a month after, when he came on in the 60th minute as a substitute against FC Krasnodar. Weigl's remarkable play earned him a starting place in Dortmund and helped them finish 2nd in the Bundesliga and also played regularly as Dortmund went deep into the Europa league, before being knocked out by Liverpool. He scored his first goal for Dortmund which was also his first professional goal against Sporting CP in the UEFA Champions League, scoring the winner from outside the box in the 2–1 win. Weigl signed a new contract with Borussia on 21 December, keeping him at the club until 2021. On 13 May 2017, he suffered a fractured ankle in BVB's 1–1 away draw against FC Augsburg. On 18 May 2017, Weigl underwent a successful surgery on his injury, but would be out for three to four months. He returned to Dortmund's XI on 24 September 2017 in BVB's 6–1 home victory against Borussia Mönchengladbach.

=== Benfica ===
On 31 December 2019, Benfica announced an agreement with Dortmund to sign Weigl for €20 million. On 2 January 2020, Weigl arrived in Lisbon, where he completed the required physical examination before getting to know his new stadium, signing a contract through 30 June 2024 and being officially introduced to the supporters of his new club.

=== Borussia Mönchengladbach ===
On 1 September 2022, Borussia Mönchengladbach announced an agreement to sign Weigl on loan from Benfica.

On 5 May 2023, Borussia Mönchengladbach triggered Weigl's buyout clause of €7 million, signing him on a permanent five-year deal.

=== Al-Qadsiah ===
On 1 September 2025, Weigl joined Saudi Pro League club Al-Qadsiah on a two-year deal.

== International career ==
Weigl started to represent Germany at youth levels during the qualification for the 2014 European Under-19 Championship, which was eventually won by Germany. He was part of the U-20 squad in August 2014. On 13 October 2014, Weigl scored his first international goal in a 1–1 draw against the Netherlands U20. Weigl made his debut for the Germany U-21 team on 3 September 2015, in a friendly match against Denmark.

Rewarded for a fine Bundesliga debut with a place in Germany's provisional squad for Euro 2016, Weigl debuted for the Germany senior squad when he came off the bench in a 3–1 friendly defeat against Slovakia.

== Career statistics ==
=== Club ===
As of match played 20 October 2026

Appearances and goals by club, season and competition
Club	Season	League			National cup (Note: Includes DFB-Pokal, Taça de Portugal, King's Cup)		League cup (Note: Includes Taça da Liga)		Continental		Other		Total	
Club	Season	Division	Apps	Goals	Apps	Goals	Apps	Goals	Apps	Goals	Apps	Goals	Apps	Goals
1860 Munich II	2013–14	Regionalliga Bayern	23	0	—		—		—		—		23	0
1860 Munich	2013–14	2. Bundesliga	14	0	0	0	—		—		—		14	0
1860 Munich	2014–15	2. Bundesliga	24	0	1	0	—		—		1 (Note: Appearance in 2. Bundesliga relegation play-offs)	0	26	0
1860 Munich	Total		38	0	1	0	—		—		1	0	40	0
Borussia Dortmund	2015–16	Bundesliga	30	0	5	0	—		16 (Note: Appearance(s) in UEFA Europa League)	0	—		51	0
Borussia Dortmund	2016–17	Bundesliga	30	0	3	0	—		9 (Note: Appearance(s) in UEFA Champions League)	1	1 (Note: Appearance in DFL-Supercup)	0	43	1
Borussia Dortmund	2017–18	Bundesliga	25	1	1	0	—		7 (Note: Five appearances in UEFA Champions League, two appearances in UEFA Europa League)	0	0	0	33	1
Borussia Dortmund	2018–19	Bundesliga	18	1	2	0	—		4	0	—		24	1
Borussia Dortmund	2019–20	Bundesliga	13	1	2	0	—		4	0	1	0	20	1
Borussia Dortmund	Total		116	3	13	0	—		40	1	2	0	171	4
Borussia Dortmund II	2017–18	Regionalliga West	1	0	—		—		—		—		1	0
Borussia Dortmund II	2018–19	Regionalliga West	1	0	—		—		—		—		1	0
Borussia Dortmund II	Total		2	0	—		—		—		—		2	0
Benfica	2019–20	Primeira Liga	18	1	2	0	0	0	1	0	0	0	21	1
Benfica	2020–21	Primeira Liga	28	0	4	0	2	0	8 (Note: One appearance in UEFA Champions League, seven appearances and one goal in UEFA Europa League)	1	1 (Note: Appearance in Supertaça Cândido de Oliveira)	0	43	1
Benfica	2021–22	Primeira Liga	29	2	3	0	3	0	13	1	—		48	3
Benfica	2022–23	Primeira Liga	2	0	0	0	0	0	1	0	—		3	0
Benfica	Total		77	3	9	0	5	0	23	2	1	0	115	5
Borussia Mönchengladbach (loan)	2022–23	Bundesliga	23	1	1	0	—		—		—		24	1
Borussia Mönchengladbach	2023–24	Bundesliga	31	2	4	0	—		—		—		35	2
Borussia Mönchengladbach	2024–25	Bundesliga	33	0	2	0	—		—		—		35	0
Borussia Mönchengladbach	Gladbach total		87	3	7	0	—		—		—		94	3
Al-Qadsiah	2025–26	Saudi Pro League	25	1	3	0	—		—		—		28	1
Al-Qadsiah	2026–27	Saudi Pro League	9	0	1	0	—		2 (Note: Appearances in AFC Champions League Elite)	0	0	0	12	0
Al-Qadsiah	Total		34	1	4	0	—		2	0	0	0	40	1
Career total			377	10	34	0	5	0	65	3	4	0	485	13

=== International ===
As of match played 26 March 2022

Appearances and goals by national team and year
National team	Year	Apps	Goals
Germany	2016	4	0
Germany	2017	1	0
Germany	2022	1	0
Total		6	0

== Honours ==
Borussia Dortmund

- DFB-Pokal: 2016–17
- DFL-Supercup: 2019

Benfica

- Primeira Liga: 2022–23

Individual

- Facebook FA Bundesliga Newcomer of the Year: 2016
- VDV Newcomer of the Season: 2015–16
