= Marcel Schmelzer =

German professional footballer (born 1988)

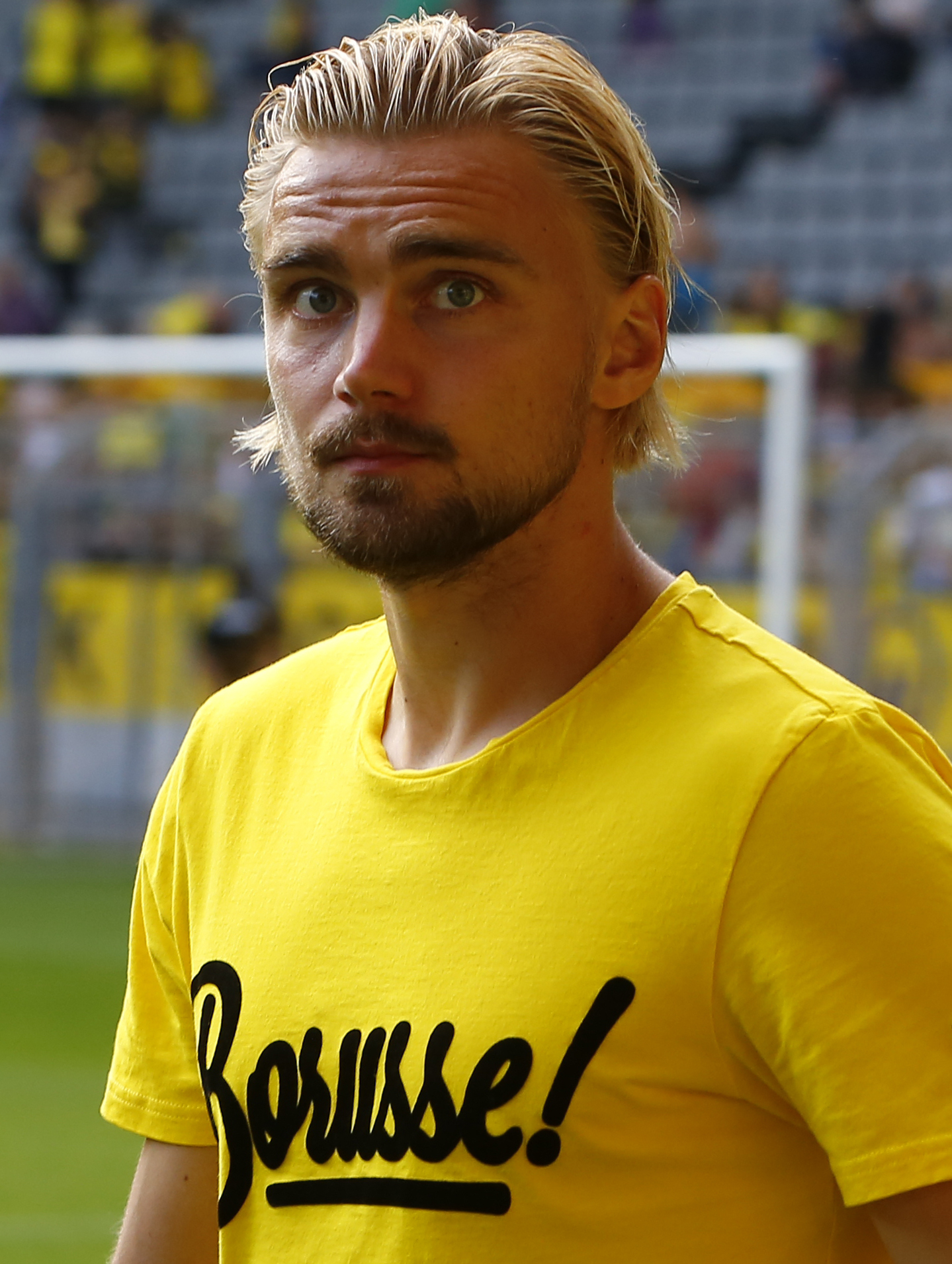
- Schmelzer with Borussia Dortmund in 2014

Personal information
- Full name: Marcel Schmelzer
- Date of birth: 22 January 1988 (age 38)
- Place of birth: Magdeburg, East Germany
- Height: 1.80 m (5 ft 11 in)
- Position: Left-back

Youth career
- 1997–2001: Fortuna Magdeburg
- 2001–2005: 1. FC Magdeburg
- 2005–2007: Borussia Dortmund

Senior career*
Years	Team	Apps	(Gls)
2005–2009	Borussia Dortmund II	38	(0)
2008–2022	Borussia Dortmund	258	(3)
Total		296	(3)

International career
2009–2010	Germany U21	11	(0)
2010–2014	Germany	16	(0)
Medal record
Representing Germany
UEFA European Championship
Bronze medal – third place	2012 Poland–Ukraine	Team
UEFA European Under-21 Championship
Winner	2009 Sweden	Team
- * Club domestic league appearances and goals

Marcel Schmelzer (German pronunciation: [maʁˈsɛl ˈʃmɛltsɐ]; born 22 January 1988) is a German former professional footballer who played mainly as a left-back.

A Borussia Dortmund youth graduate, Schmelzer spent his entire career with the club, playing with the side in the Bundesliga across 14 full seasons, and served as captain for the club from 2016 to 2018. He retired from football in 2022, ending a 17-year long professional career.

Having represented Germany at under-21 level, he made his senior debut for national team in 2010, going on to earn 16 caps until 2014.

== Club career ==
Schmelzer was born in Magdeburg, Saxony-Anhalt. He started his professional career with Borussia Dortmund, making his first appearance on 9 August 2008, in the German Cup first-round match against Rot-Weiss Essen. His first league appearance came in the following week, as he played the final twenty minutes of a 3–2 win at Bayer Leverkusen. Schmelzer had his best season for Borussia Dortmund in the 2010–11 season, where he managed to play every minute of the season for the team who went on to win the Bundesliga that year.

The following season, Schmelzer, who missed the beginning of the Bundesliga due to injury, enjoyed yet another trophy as he helped Dortmund win another Bundesliga title. In addition to being the left back for the team for the entire season, Schmelzer also helped Dortmund secure the DFB-Pokal with a 5–2 win against Bayern Munich, making it three titles in two years.

On 11 January 2013, Schmelzer extended his contract with Borussia, which will keep him at the club until 2017.

On 27 July 2013, Schmelzer won the 2013 DFL-Supercup with Dortmund 4–2 against rivals Bayern Munich.

On 25 April 2016, Marcel Schmelzer yet again extended his contract with BVB. He agreed on a five-year deal which will keep him with the black and yellows through 2021.

After the departure of Mats Hummels, Schmelzer was named a candidate to be the new captain. On 14 August 2016, Schmelzer captained his first match against league champions Bayern Munich during the 2–0 defeat of the DFL-Supercup.

On 31 May 2020, he scored his first Bundesliga goal in seven years in a 6–1 win against Paderborn, coming off the bench for Moroccan right-back Achraf Hakimi. Later that day, fans voted him as Man of the Match on the club's official Instagram account. Despite missing virtually the entire 2020–21 season and Dortmund's DFB-Pokal triumph, Schmelzer extended his contract with Dortmund in the summer of 2021 for another year, although this was primarily to cover medical insurance regarding a long-term knee injury rather than concerning game time.

In May 2022, Schmelzer announced that he would retire from professional football after the end of the 2021–22 season. He officially retired after 17 seasons as a Borussia Dortmund player and was celebrated following Dortmund's last match of the season against Hertha BSC. Overall, he played 258 German top-flight matches across 17 years as a footballer.

== International career ==
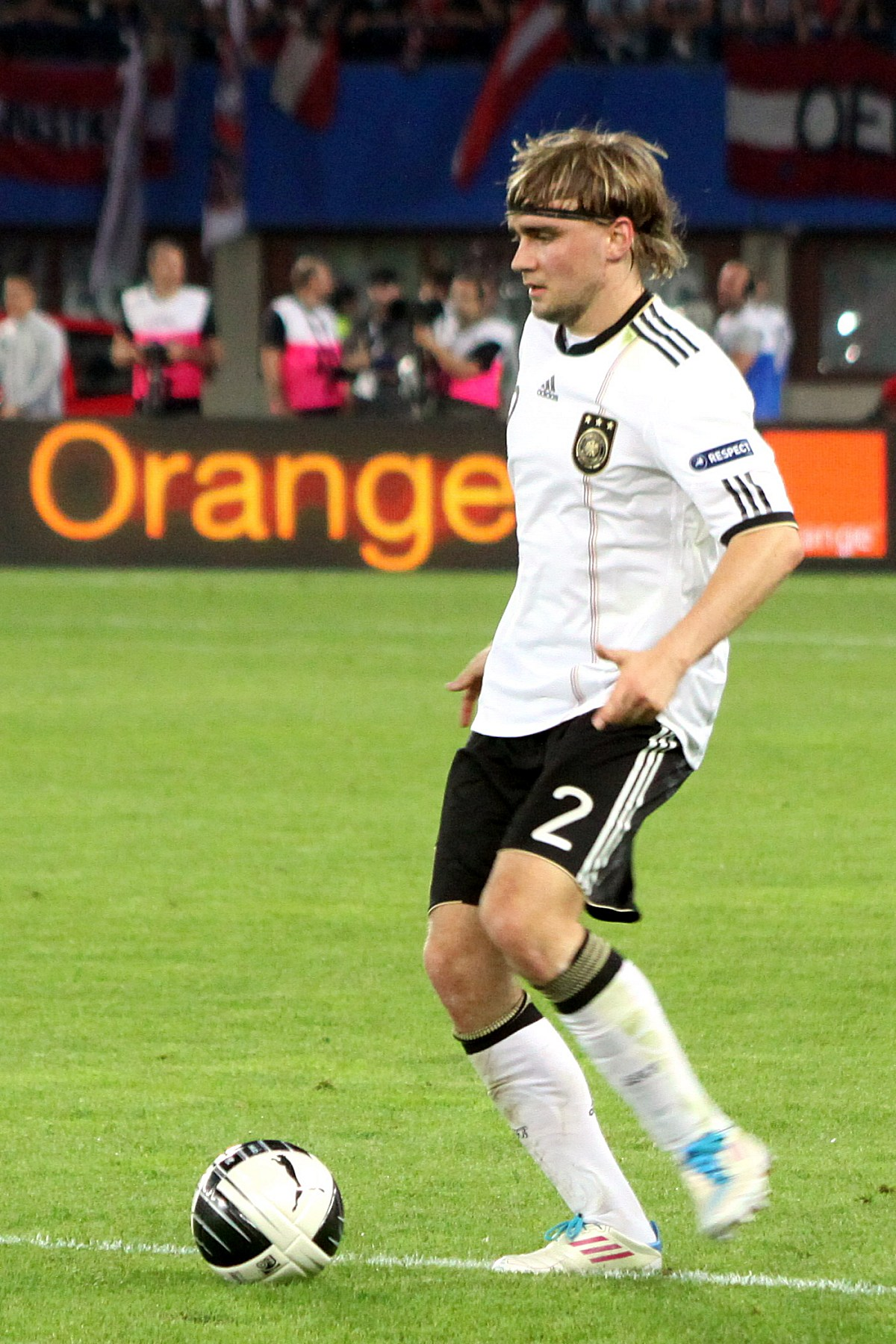
Schmelzer playing for Germany

Schmelzer was called up by the U21 team for the 2009 European Championship, being used regularly, although not as a starter, he played the final five minutes in the final, a 4–0 success against England. For the senior team, he made 16 appearances between 2010 and 2014.

== Managerial career ==
Schmelzer became an assistant coach to Marco Lehmann at Borussia Dortmund U17 for the 2023–24 season. On 3 May 2024, it was announced that he would join Jan Zimmermann's coaching staff at Borussia Dortmund II for the 2024–25 season.

== Personal life ==
Schmelzer is married to Jenny Schmelzer.

== Career statistics ==
=== Club ===
Appearances and goals by club, season and competition
Club	Season	League			DFB-Pokal		Continental		Other		Total	
Club	Season	Division	Apps	Goals	Apps	Goals	Apps	Goals	Apps	Goals	Apps	Goals
Borussia Dortmund II	2005–06	Oberliga Westfalen	1	0	—		—		—		1	0
Borussia Dortmund II	2007–08	Regionalliga Nord	26	0	—		—		—		26	0
Borussia Dortmund II	2008–09	Regionalliga West	10	0	—		—		—		10	0
Borussia Dortmund II	2009–10	3. Liga	1	0	—		—		—		1	0
Borussia Dortmund II	Total		38	0	0	0	0	0	0	0	38	0
Borussia Dortmund	2008–09	Bundesliga	12	0	3	0	1	0	—		16	0
Borussia Dortmund	2009–10	Bundesliga	28	0	2	0	—		—		30	0
Borussia Dortmund	2010–11	Bundesliga	34	0	2	0	7	0	—		43	0
Borussia Dortmund	2011–12	Bundesliga	28	1	4	0	5	0	—		37	1
Borussia Dortmund	2012–13	Bundesliga	29	0	3	1	13	1	1 (Note: Appearance in DFL-Supercup)	0	46	2
Borussia Dortmund	2013–14	Bundesliga	19	1	3	0	5	0	1	0	28	1
Borussia Dortmund	2014–15	Bundesliga	22	0	4	0	6	0	1	0	33	0
Borussia Dortmund	2015–16	Bundesliga	26	0	6	0	15	0	—		47	0
Borussia Dortmund	2016–17	Bundesliga	26	0	5	1	7	0	1	0	39	1
Borussia Dortmund	2017–18	Bundesliga	18	0	2	0	7	1	0	0	27	1
Borussia Dortmund	2018–19	Bundesliga	9	0	1	0	3	0	—		13	0
Borussia Dortmund	2019–20	Bundesliga	7	1	0	0	1	0	0	0	8	1
Borussia Dortmund	2020–21	Bundesliga	0	0	0	0	0	0	0	0	0	0
Borussia Dortmund	2021–22	Bundesliga	0	0	0	0	0	0	0	0	0	0
Borussia Dortmund	Total		258	3	35	2	70	2	4	0	367	7
Career total			296	3	35	2	70	2	4	0	405	7

=== International ===
Appearances and goals by national team and year
National team	Year	Apps	Goals
Germany	2010	1	0
Germany	2011	4	0
Germany	2012	4	0
Germany	2013	6	0
Germany	2014	1	0
Total		16	0

== Honours ==
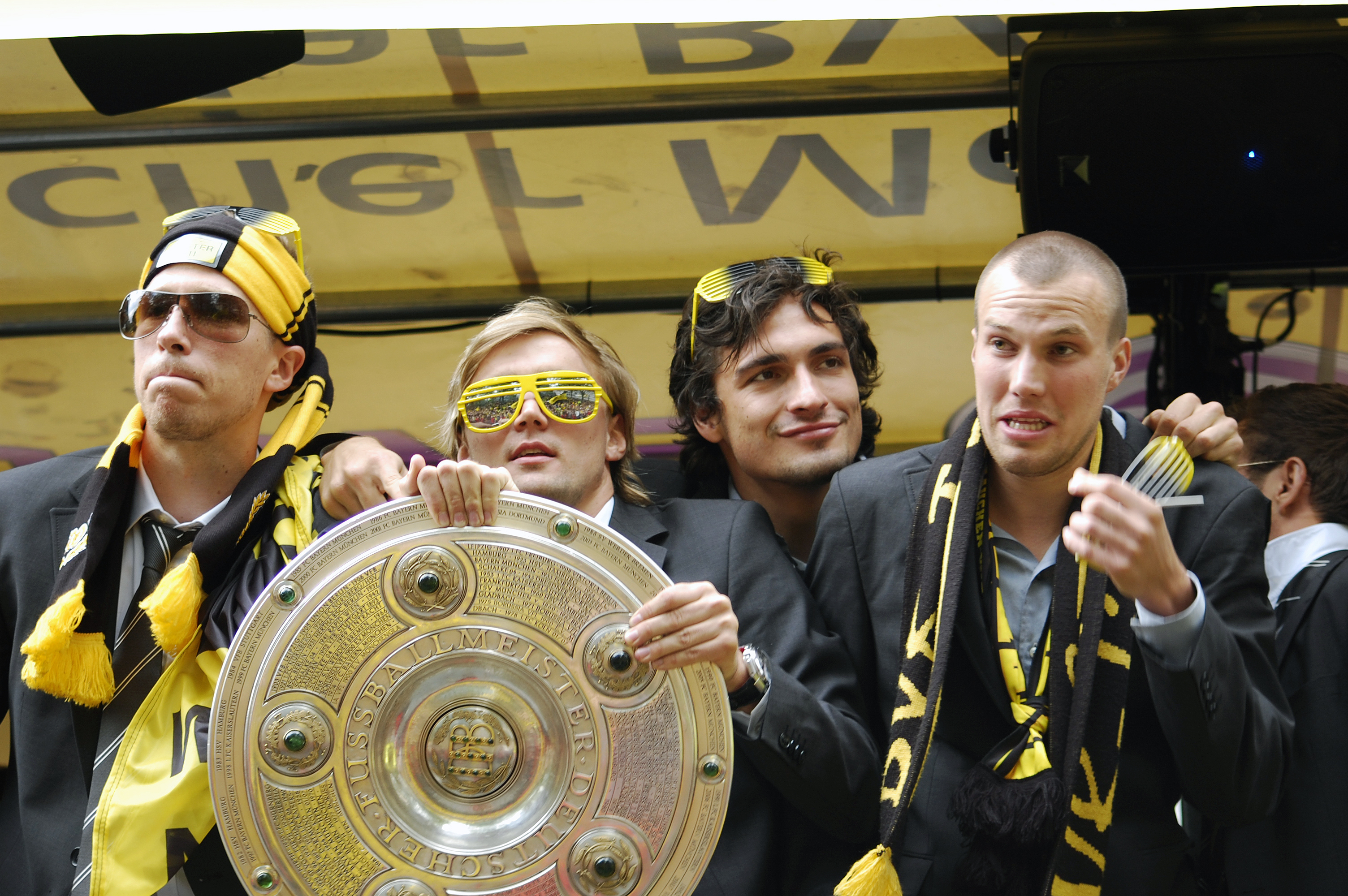
Schmelzer (holding the trophy) celebrates winning the Bundesliga with Borussia Dortmund in 2011.

Borussia Dortmund

- Bundesliga: 2010–11, 2011–12
- DFB-Pokal: 2011–12, 2016–17, 2020–21
- DFL-Supercup: 2013, 2014, 2019
- UEFA Champions League runner-up: 2012–13

Germany U21

- UEFA European Under-21 Championship: 2009

== See also ==
- List of one-club men
