= Dan-Axel Zagadou =

French footballer (born 1999)

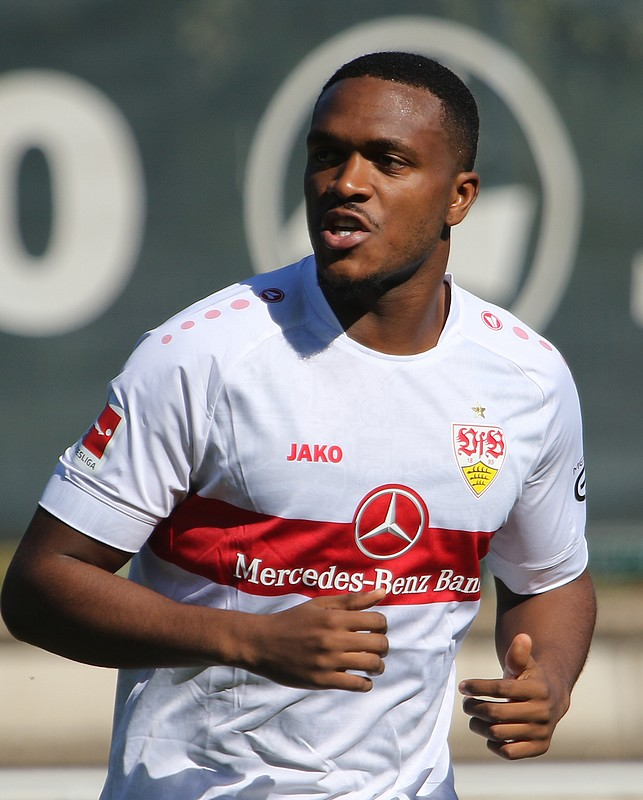
- Zagadou with VfB Stuttgart in 2022

Personal information
- Full name: Dan-Axel Zagadou
- Date of birth: 3 June 1999 (age 27)
- Place of birth: Créteil, France
- Height: 1.96 m (6 ft 5 in)
- Position: Centre-back

Team information
- Current team: VfB Stuttgart
- Number: 23

Youth career
- 2006–2011: Créteil
- 2011–2016: Paris Saint-Germain

Senior career*
Years	Team	Apps	(Gls)
2016–2017	Paris Saint-Germain B	9	(0)
2017–2022	Borussia Dortmund	67	(4)
2018–2022	Borussia Dortmund II	4	(0)
2022–	VfB Stuttgart	41	(1)
2025–	VfB Stuttgart II	3	(1)

International career^{‡}
2014–2015	France U16	13	(2)
2015–2016	France U17	10	(0)
2016–2017	France U18	9	(0)
2017	France U19	6	(1)
2018–2019	France U20	7	(2)
2019	France U21	6	(2)
- * Club domestic league appearances and goals as of 17:30, 26 April 2026 (UTC) ‡ National team caps and goals as of 23:32, 6 January 2022 (UTC)

Dan-Axel Zagadou (born 3 June 1999) is a French professional footballer who plays as a centre-back for Bundesliga club VfB Stuttgart. He has represented France from under-16 to under-21 levels.

== Early life ==
Zagadou was born in Créteil, in the southeastern suburbs of Paris, to Ivorian parents. He acquired French nationality on 8 July 2008, through the collective effect of his mother's naturalization.

== Club career ==
=== Early career ===
Zagadou began his career playing at junior level for hometown club US Créteil, before signing for Paris Saint-Germain at the age of 12 in 2011. He then spent the next five seasons developing in PSG's academy, before being assigned to the reserve squad in 2016, where he made 9 appearances in the CFA.

=== Borussia Dortmund ===
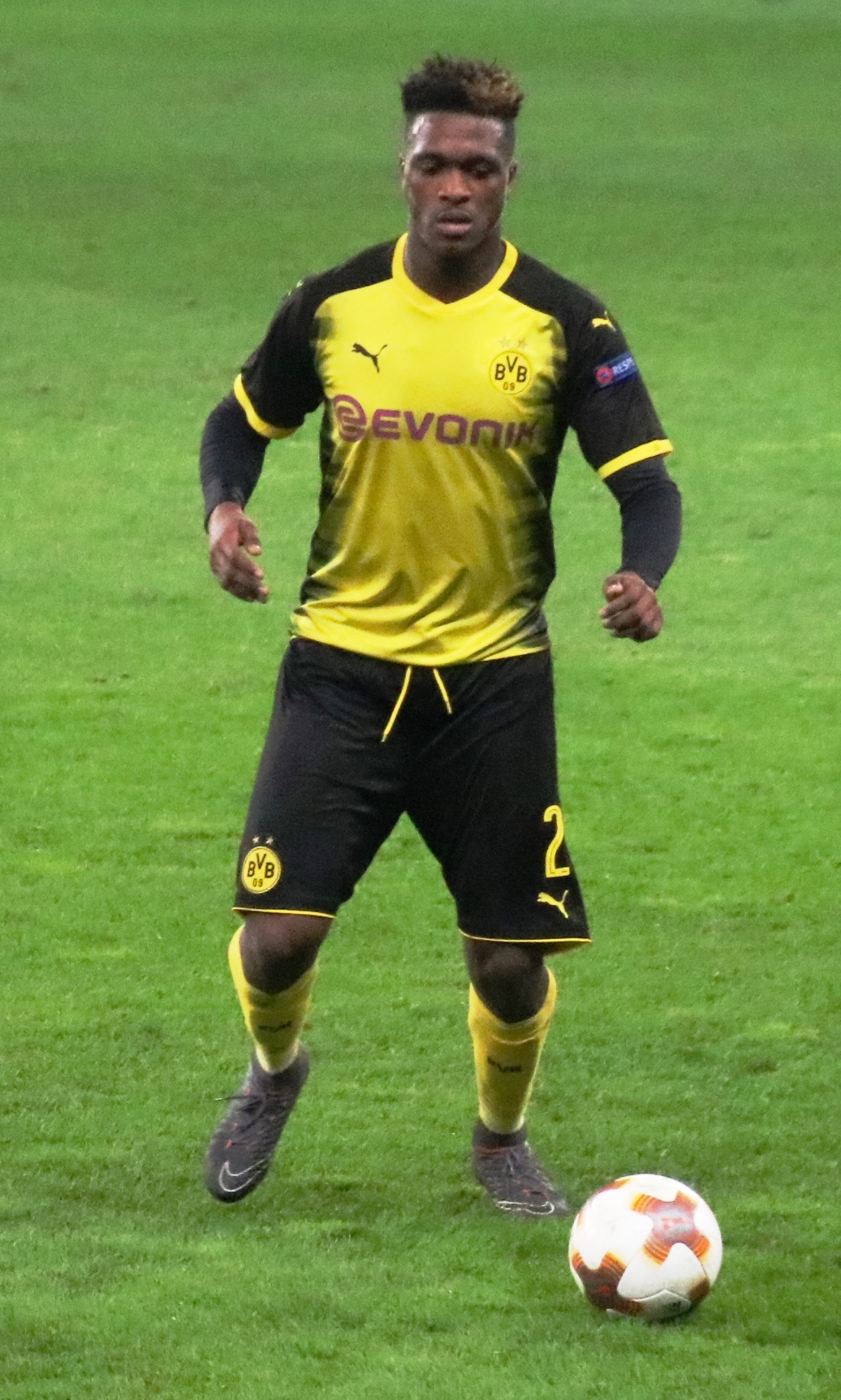
Zagadou with Borussia Dortmund in 2018

On 5 June 2017, German club Borussia Dortmund announced the signing of Zagadou on a free transfer and a five-year contract. On 28 October 2017, he scored his first goal for Dortmund in a 4–2 away loss against Hannover 96, where he also received his first red card in the 59th minute.

On 12 May 2022, it was announced that Zagadou's contract would not be renewed and that he was to become a free agent.

=== VfB Stuttgart ===
On 19 September 2022, Zagadou signed a four-year contract with VfB Stuttgart.

== International career ==
Zagadou has represented France at U16, U17, U18, U19, U20 and U21 levels.

== Career statistics ==
As of match played 26 April 2026

Appearances and goals by club, season and competition
Club	Season	League			DFB-Pokal		Europe		Other		Total	
Club	Season	Division	Apps	Goals	Apps	Goals	Apps	Goals	Apps	Goals	Apps	Goals
Paris Saint-Germain B	2016–17	CFA	9	0	—		—		—		9	0
Borussia Dortmund	2017–18	Bundesliga	11	1	1	0	3 (Note: Two appearances in UEFA Champions League, one appearance in UEFA Europa League)	0	1 (Note: Appearance in DFL-Supercup)	0	16	1
Borussia Dortmund	2018–19	Bundesliga	17	2	1	0	4 (Note: Appearance(s) in UEFA Champions League)	0	—		22	2
Borussia Dortmund	2019–20	Bundesliga	15	1	2	0	5	0	0	0	22	1
Borussia Dortmund	2020–21	Bundesliga	9	0	2	0	2	0	0	0	13	0
Borussia Dortmund	2021–22	Bundesliga	15	0	1	0	3	0	0	0	19	0
Borussia Dortmund	Total		67	4	7	0	17	0	1	0	92	4
Borussia Dortmund II	2018–19	Regionalliga West	1	0	—		—		—		1	0
Borussia Dortmund II	2021–22	3. Liga	3	0	—		—		—		3	0
Borussia Dortmund II	Total		4	0	—		—		—		4	0
VfB Stuttgart	2022–23	Bundesliga	17	0	1	0	—		2 (Note: Appearances in Bundesliga relegation play-offs)	0	20	0
VfB Stuttgart	2023–24	Bundesliga	19	1	3	0	—		—		22	1
VfB Stuttgart	2024–25	Bundesliga	2	0	0	0	1	0	0	0	3	0
VfB Stuttgart	2025–26	Bundesliga	3	0	1	0	1 (Note: Appearance in UEFA Europa League)	0	0	0	5	0
VfB Stuttgart	Total		41	1	5	0	2	0	2	0	50	1
VfB Stuttgart II	2025–26	3. Liga	3	1	—		—		—		3	1
Career total			124	6	12	0	19	0	3	0	158	6

== Honours ==
Borussia Dortmund

- DFB-Pokal: 2020–21
- DFL-Supercup: 2019

VfB Stuttgart

DFB-Pokal: 2024–25

Individual

- UEFA European Under-17 Championship Team of the Tournament: 2016
