= Jacob Bruun Larsen =

Danish footballer (born 1998)

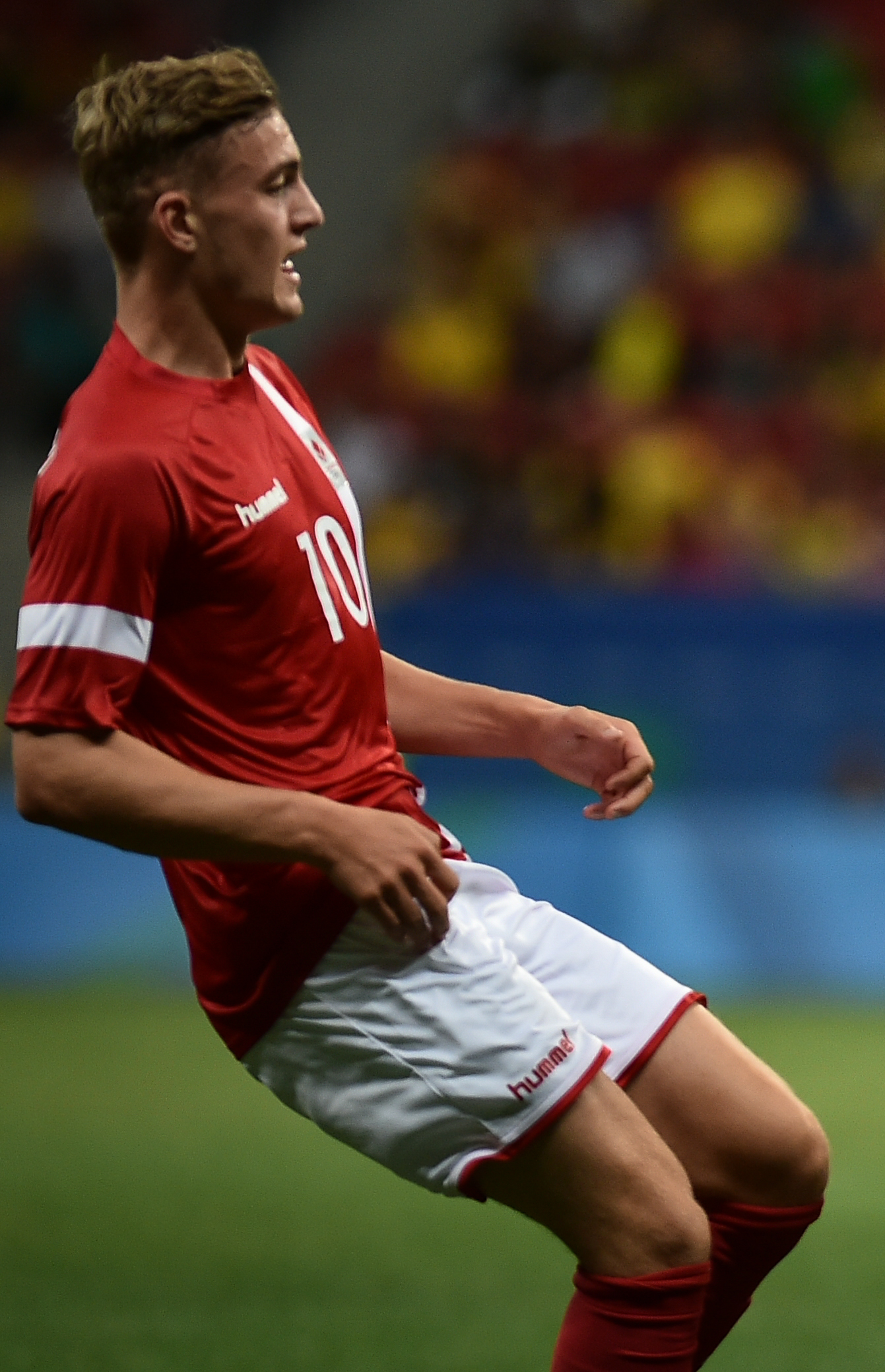
- Bruun Larsen playing for Denmark at the 2016 Summer Olympics

Personal information
- Full name: Jacob Bruun Larsen
- Date of birth: 19 September 1998 (age 28)
- Place of birth: Kongens Lyngby, Denmark
- Height: 1.83 m (6 ft 0 in)
- Positions: Left winger; attacking midfielder

Team information
- Current team: Burnley
- Number: 7

Youth career
- –2015: Lyngby
- 2015–2016: Borussia Dortmund

Senior career*
Years	Team	Apps	(Gls)
2016–2020	Borussia Dortmund	29	(2)
2018	→ VfB Stuttgart (loan)	4	(0)
2020–2025	TSG Hoffenheim	62	(7)
2021	→ Anderlecht (loan)	15	(2)
2023–2024	→ Burnley (loan)	32	(6)
2025	VfB Stuttgart	15	(1)
2025–	Burnley	37	(2)

International career^{‡}
2013–2014	Denmark U16	9	(1)
2014–2015	Denmark U17	12	(1)
2015	Denmark U18	4	(1)
2015–2016	Denmark U19	12	(5)
2017–2021	Denmark U21	24	(7)
2016	Denmark Olympic	4	(0)
2019–	Denmark	8	(1)
- * Club domestic league appearances and goals as of 20:57, 18 October 2026 (UTC) ‡ National team caps and goals as of 12:25, 9 September 2025 (UTC)

Jacob Bruun Larsen (born 19 September 1998) is a Danish professional footballer who plays as a left winger or attacking midfielder for EFL Championship club Burnley and the Denmark national team.

Bruun Larsen represented Denmark at UEFA Euro 2024. He also competed at the 2016 Summer Olympics.

== Club career ==
=== Borussia Dortmund ===
In 2015, Bruun Larsen signed for Borussia Dortmund from Lyngby. On 15 March 2017, the club announced the extension of his contract until 2021.

On 23 January 2018, Bruun Larsen joined VfB Stuttgart on a half-season loan deal.

Bruun Larsen scored his first goal for Borussia Dortmund in a 7–0 victory over 1. FC Nürnberg on 27 September 2018.

=== TSG Hoffenheim ===
On 31 January 2020, TSG Hoffenheim announced the signing of Bruun Larsen on a four-and-a-half-year deal.

==== Loan to Anderlecht ====
Bruun Larsen signed for Belgian club Anderlecht on 23 January 2021. He agreed to a loan until the end of the season.

==== Loan to Burnley ====
On 27 July 2023, Bruun Larsen signed for newly promoted Premier League team Burnley on a season-long loan deal. On 21 May 2024, Burnley said it was working to make the loan permanent.

=== Return to Stuttgart ===
On 8 January 2025, Bruun Larsen returned to VfB Stuttgart on a permanent deal, signing a contract until 2027.

=== Return to Burnley ===
On 11 July 2025, Bruun Larsen returned to newly promoted Premier League side Burnley on a permanent deal.

== International career ==
Bruun Larsen was chosen to represent Denmark at the Olympics in Rio de Janeiro.

He made his debut for the senior Denmark national football team on 21 March 2019 in a friendly against Kosovo, as a starter.

== Career statistics ==
=== Club ===
As of match played 16 October 2026

Appearances and goals by club, season and competition
Club	Season	League			National cup (Note: Includes DFB-Pokal, Belgian Cup, FA Cup)		League cup (Note: Includes EFL Cup)		Europe		Other		Total	
Club	Season	Division	Apps	Goals	Apps	Goals	Apps	Goals	Apps	Goals	Apps	Goals	Apps	Goals
Borussia Dortmund	2016–17	Bundesliga	0	0	1	0	—		0	0	0	0	1	0
Borussia Dortmund	2017–18	Bundesliga	1	0	0	0	—		0	0	0	0	1	0
Borussia Dortmund	2018–19	Bundesliga	24	2	1	0	—		5 (Note: Appearances in UEFA Champions League)	1	—		30	3
Borussia Dortmund	2019–20	Bundesliga	4	0	2	0	—		2	0	1 (Note: Appearance in DFL-Supercup)	0	9	0
Borussia Dortmund	Total		29	2	4	0	—		7	1	1	0	41	3
VfB Stuttgart (loan)	2017–18	Bundesliga	4	0	—		—		—		—		4	0
TSG Hoffenheim	2019–20	Bundesliga	11	0	1	0	—		—		—		12	0
TSG Hoffenheim	2020–21	Bundesliga	2	0	0	0	—		1 (Note: Appearance(s) in UEFA Europa League)	0	—		3	0
TSG Hoffenheim	2021–22	Bundesliga	25	4	3	1	—		—		—		28	5
TSG Hoffenheim	2022–23	Bundesliga	12	1	2	0	—		—		—		14	1
TSG Hoffenheim	2024–25	Bundesliga	12	2	2	0	—		5	0	—		19	2
TSG Hoffenheim	Total		62	7	8	1	—		6	0	—		76	8
Anderlecht (loan)	2020–21	Belgian Pro League	15	2	4	0	—		—		—		19	2
Burnley (loan)	2023–24	Premier League	32	6	1	0	3	1	—		—		36	7
VfB Stuttgart	2024–25	Bundesliga	15	1	1	0	—		—		—		16	1
Burnley	2025–26	Premier League	28	0	2	0	0	0	—		—		30	0
Burnley	2026–27	Championship	9	2	0	0	2	0	—		—		11	2
Burnley	Total		37	2	2	0	2	0	—		—		41	2
Career total			194	20	20	1	5	1	13	1	1	0	233	23

=== International ===
As of match played 8 September 2025

Appearances and goals by national team and year
National team	Year	Apps	Goals
Denmark	2019	1	0
Denmark	2021	3	1
Denmark	2022	2	0
Denmark	2024	1	0
Denmark	2025	1	0
Total		8	1

Scores and results list Denmark's goal tally first, score column indicates score after each Bruun Larsen goal.

List of international goals scored by Jacob Bruun Larsen
No.	Date	Venue	Opponent	Score	Result	Competition
1	12 November 2021	Parken Stadium, Copenhagen, Denmark	Faroe Islands	2–0	3–1	2022 FIFA World Cup qualification

== Honours ==
Borussia Dortmund U19

- Under 19 Bundesliga: 2015–16, 2016–17

Borussia Dortmund

- DFB-Pokal: 2016–17
- DFL-Supercup: 2019

VfB Stuttgart

- DFB-Pokal: 2024–25

Individual

- UEFA European Under-21 Championship Team of the Tournament: 2021
