= Nico Schulz =

German footballer (born 1993)

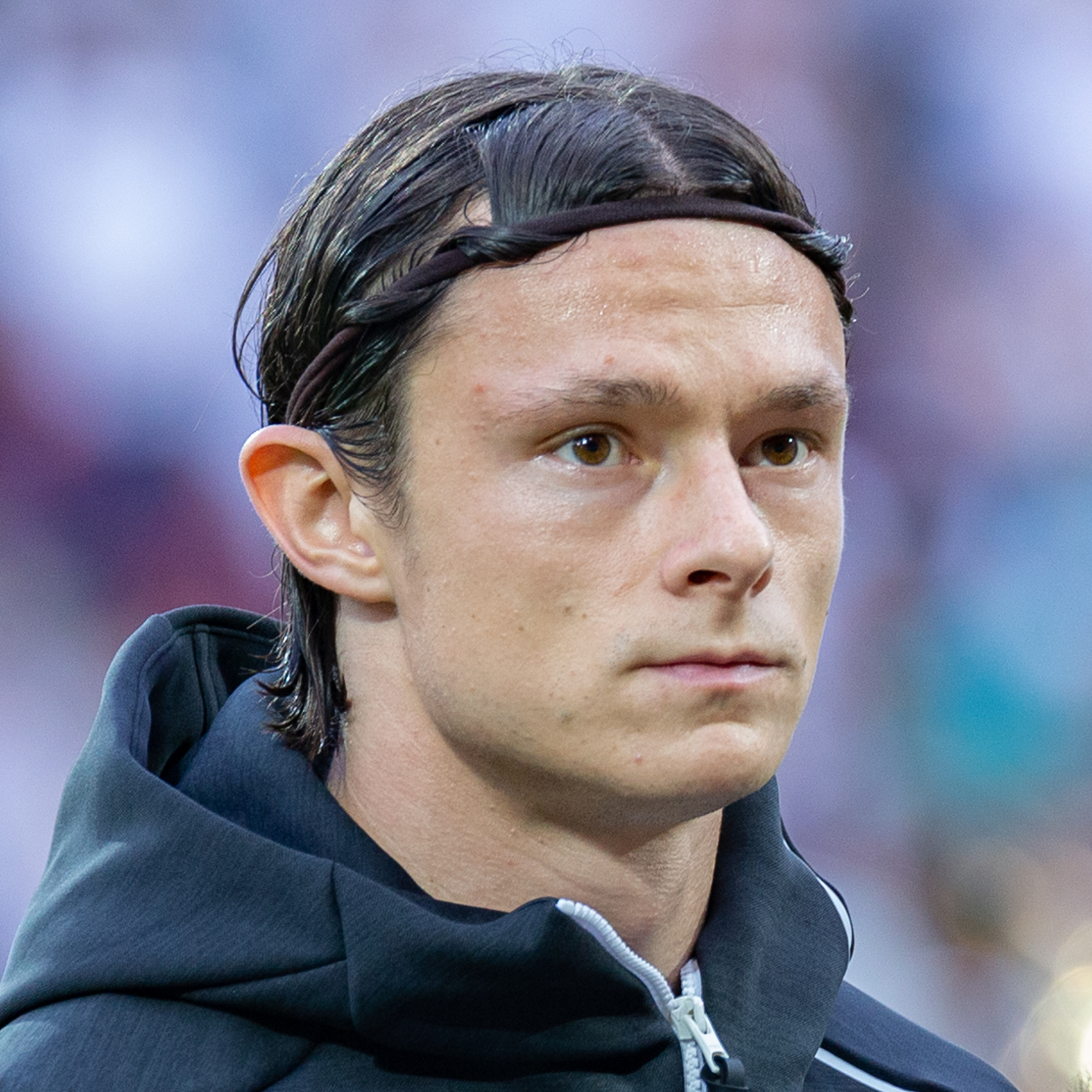
- Schulz with Germany in 2019

Personal information
- Date of birth: 1 April 1993 (age 33)
- Place of birth: Berlin, Germany
- Height: 1.81 m (5 ft 11 in)
- Position: Left-back

Youth career
- BSC Rehberge Berlin
- 2000–2010: Hertha BSC

Senior career*
Years	Team	Apps	(Gls)
2010–2012	Hertha BSC II	24	(0)
2010–2015	Hertha BSC	93	(2)
2015–2017	Borussia Mönchengladbach	13	(1)
2017–2019	1899 Hoffenheim	57	(2)
2019–2023	Borussia Dortmund	40	(1)
2024–2025	Ankaragücü	26	(0)

International career^{‡}
2008–2009	Germany U16	11	(0)
2009–2010	Germany U17	12	(0)
2010–2011	Germany U18	2	(0)
2011–2012	Germany U19	11	(4)
2013–2015	Germany U21	14	(2)
2018–2020	Germany	12	(2)
- * Club domestic league appearances and goals as of 15 June 2025 ‡ National team caps and goals as of 11 November 2020

Nico Schulz (German pronunciation: [ˈniːko ˈʃʊlts]; born 1 April 1993) is a German professional footballer who plays as a left-back.

== Club career ==
Schulz played for BSC Rehberge Berlin until 2000 before joining Hertha BSC at the age of seven. He performed convincingly as a youth player, attracting the attention of scouts from Liverpool whose offers he eventually refused. In the following years he played for Hertha's youth teams and reached the final of the U19 DFB-Pokal in 2009–10, but lost 1–2 against 1899 Hoffenheim.

In the following summer break, Schulz joined the training camp with the professional players. He made his first competitive match for the first team in the first round of the DFB-Pokal against SC Pfullendorf with a 2–0 win on 14 August 2010, coming on as a substitute for Valeri Domovchiyski in the 81st minute. Over the next two seasons, Schulz became a regular substitute and occasional starter. He scored his first goal for Hertha BSC on 30 March 2013 against VfL Bochum.

On 18 August 2015, Schulz joined Borussia Mönchengladbach on a four-year deal. In 2017, he signed a three-year contract with 1899 Hoffenheim.

On 22 May 2019, Schulz joined Borussia Dortmund, along with Julian Brandt and Thorgan Hazard. Under coach Edin Terzić, Schulz played no competitive matches with the senior team, he only featured once in a friendly match for Borussia Dortmund II against Go Ahead Eagles in September 2022. On 20 July 2023, his contract with Dortmund was terminated with one year left. In February 2024, he trained with EFL Championship club Sheffield Wednesday, with manager Danny Röhl indicating a desire to sign the player. In September 2024, after more than a year without a club, Schulz signed a two-year deal with TFF 1. Lig side Ankaragücü. Following Ankaragücü's relegation to the third-tier TFF 2. Lig, his contract was mutually terminated on 7 July 2025.

== International career ==
Schulz was called up to the full Germany squad for the first time on 29 August 2018, for Germany's opening 2018–19 UEFA Nations League match against France and the friendly against Peru. He made his international début in the latter match, scoring the game-winning goal in the 85th minute. He was also eligible to play for Italy through his father, who hails from Ischia.

== Personal life ==
His brother Gian Luca Schulz is also a professional footballer.

In August 2022, Schulz's former girlfriend filed a criminal complaint against him of multiple cases of domestic violence alleged to have occurred in 2020. He was charged with aggravated assault in relation to these complaints. Schulz appeared in court on 28 February 2024. He was told to pay a total of €150,000 to five charities, and if he did so within three months, the case against him would be discontinued. Prior to his appearance in court, he had paid his ex-partner "an undisclosed amount of damages", and she had "refused to testify in court".

== Career statistics ==
=== Club ===
As of match played 7 May 2022

Appearances and goals by club, season and competition
Club	Season	League			DFB-Pokal		Europe		Other		Total	
Club	Season	Division	Apps	Goals	Apps	Goals	Apps	Goals	Apps	Goals	Apps	Goals
Hertha BSC II	2010–11	Regionalliga Nord	8	0	—		—		—		8	0
Hertha BSC II	2011–12	Regionalliga Nord	14	0	—		—		—		14	0
Hertha BSC II	2012–13	Regionalliga Nordost	1	0	—		—		—		1	0
Hertha BSC II	2013–14	Regionalliga Nordost	1	0	—		—		—		1	0
Hertha BSC II	Total		24	0	—		—		—		24	0
Hertha BSC	2010–11	2. Bundesliga	21	0	2	0	—		—		23	0
Hertha BSC	2012–13	2. Bundesliga	20	1	0	0	—		—		20	1
Hertha BSC	2013–14	Bundesliga	23	0	1	0	—		—		24	0
Hertha BSC	2014–15	Bundesliga	28	1	1	0	—		—		29	1
Hertha BSC	2015–16	Bundesliga	1	0	1	0	—		—		2	0
Hertha BSC	Total		93	2	5	0	—		—		98	2
Borussia Mönchengladbach	2015–16	Bundesliga	1	0	0	0	1	0	—		2	0
Borussia Mönchengladbach	2016–17	Bundesliga	12	1	1	0	3	0	—		16	1
Borussia Mönchengladbach	Total		13	1	1	0	4	0	—		18	1
Borussia Mönchengladbach II	2016–17	Regionalliga West	2	0	—		—		—		2	0
1899 Hoffenheim	2017–18	Bundesliga	27	1	2	0	5	1	—		34	2
1899 Hoffenheim	2018–19	Bundesliga	30	1	2	1	5	0	—		37	2
1899 Hoffenheim	Total		57	2	4	1	10	1	—		71	4
Borussia Dortmund	2019–20	Bundesliga	11	1	3	0	3	0	1	0	18	1
Borussia Dortmund	2020–21	Bundesliga	13	0	2	0	3	0	1	0	19	0
Borussia Dortmund	2021–22	Bundesliga	16	0	1	0	6	0	1	0	24	0
Borussia Dortmund	2022–23	Bundesliga	0	0	0	0	0	0	—		0	0
Borussia Dortmund	Total		40	1	6	0	12	0	3	0	61	1
Career total			229	6	16	1	26	1	3	0	274	8

=== International ===
As of match played 11 November 2020

Appearances and goals by national team and year
National team	Year	Apps	Goals
Germany	2018	4	1
Germany	2019	6	1
Germany	2020	2	0
Total		12	2

As of match played 24 March 2019
Scores and results list Germany's goal tally first, score column indicates score after each Schulz goal.

List of international goals scored by Nico Schulz
No.	Date	Venue	Opponent	Score	Result	Competition
1	9 September 2018	Rhein-Neckar-Arena, Sinsheim, Germany	Peru	2–1	2–1	Friendly
2	24 March 2019	Johan Cruyff Arena, Amsterdam, Netherlands	Netherlands	3–2	3–2	UEFA Euro 2020 qualification

== Honours ==
Hertha BSC

- 2. Bundesliga: 2010–11

Borussia Dortmund

- DFB-Pokal: 2020–21
- DFL-Supercup: 2019

Individual

- kicker Bundesliga Team of the Season: 2018–19
