= Ibrahim Hajtić =

German footballer

Personal information
- Date of birth: 4 April 1998 (age 28)
- Place of birth: Hattingen, Germany
- Height: 1.93 m (6 ft 4 in)
- Position: Centre-back

Team information
- Current team: ASV Heidenheim

Youth career
- –2009: 1. FC Kaiserslautern
- 2009–2017: 1. FC Heidenheim

Senior career*
Years	Team	Apps	(Gls)
2017–2018	1. FC Heidenheim	1	(0)
2018–2019	Würzburger Kickers	14	(0)
2019–2020	Energie Cottbus	2	(0)
2020–2021	FV Illertissen		
- * Club domestic league appearances and goals

Ibrahim Hajtić (born 4 April 1998) is a German footballer who plays as a centre-back.

== Career ==
Hajtić first played for 1. FC Heidenheim's first team in March 2016, being substituted on in a friendly.
