= 2019 DFL-Supercup =

German Supercup
- Match programme cover
- Event: DFL-Supercup
Borussia Dortmund	Bayern Munich
2	0
- Date: 3 August 2019
- Venue: Signal Iduna Park, Dortmund
- Man of the Match: Jadon Sancho (Borussia Dortmund)
- Referee: Daniel Siebert (Berlin)
- Attendance: 81,365
- Weather: Mostly cloudy 20 °C (68 °F); 64% humidity

The 2019 DFL-Supercup was the tenth edition of the German super cup under the name DFL-Supercup, an annual football match contested by the winners of the previous season's Bundesliga and DFB-Pokal competitions. The match was played on 3 August 2019.

The DFL-Supercup featured the runners-up of the 2018–19 Bundesliga, Borussia Dortmund, and Bayern Munich, the champions of the Bundesliga and winners of the 2018–19 DFB-Pokal. Heading into the match, Bayern were the three-time defending champions of the DFL-Supercup. The match was hosted by Borussia Dortmund at the Signal Iduna Park in Dortmund.

Borussia Dortmund won the match 2–0 to secure their sixth German super cup title.

== Teams ==
In the following table, matches until 1996 were in the DFB-Supercup era, since 2010 were in the DFL-Supercup era.

Team	Qualification	Previous appearances (bold indicates winners)
Borussia Dortmund	2018–19 Bundesliga runners-up	9 (**1989**, **1995**, **1996**, 2011, 2012, **2013**, **2014**, 2016, 2017) (Note: Winners of the unofficial 2008 German Supercup. One-time runners-up in the DFL-Ligapokal.)
Bayern Munich^{TH}	2018–19 Bundesliga champions and 2018–19 DFB-Pokal winners	12 (**1987**, 1989, **1990**, 1994, **2010**, **2012**, 2013, 2014, 2015, **2016**, **2017**, **2018**) (Note: Runners-up in the unofficial 2008 German Supercup. Six-time winners and one-time runners-up in the DFL-Ligapokal.)

== Match ==
=== Details ===
3 August 2019
20:30 CEST

Borussia Dortmund	2–0	Bayern Munich
Alcácer 48'; Sancho 69'	Report

Signal Iduna Park, Dortmund
Attendance: 81,365
Referee: Daniel Siebert (Berlin)

**Borussia Dortmund**	**Bayern Munich**

GK	35	(Switzerland) Marwin Hitz
RB	26	(Poland) Łukasz Piszczek	(substituted off) 80'
CB	16	(Switzerland) Manuel Akanji
CB	36	(Turkey) Ömer Toprak
LB	14	(Germany) Nico Schulz
CM	33	(Germany) Julian Weigl
CM	28	(Belgium) Axel Witsel
RW	7	(England) Jadon Sancho	(substituted off) 80'
AM	11	(Germany) Marco Reus (c)
LW	13	(Portugal) Raphaël Guerreiro	(substituted off) 75'
CF	9	(Spain) Paco Alcácer
Substitutes:
GK	40	(Germany) Eric Oelschlägel
DF	2	(France) Dan-Axel Zagadou
DF	5	(Morocco) Achraf Hakimi	(substituted on) 75'
DF	29	(Germany) Marcel Schmelzer
MF	6	(Denmark) Thomas Delaney
MF	8	(Germany) Mahmoud Dahoud
MF	10	(Germany) Mario Götze
FW	27	(Germany) Marius Wolf	(substituted on) 80'
FW	34	(Denmark) Jacob Bruun Larsen	(substituted on) 80'
Manager:
(Switzerland) Lucien Favre

GK	1	(Germany) Manuel Neuer (c)
RB	32	(Germany) Joshua Kimmich	(yellow card) 77'
CB	4	(Germany) Niklas Süle
CB	17	(Germany) Jérôme Boateng (Note: Jérôme Boateng was initially shown a yellow card in the 52nd minute, though this was later rescinded.)
LB	27	(Austria) David Alaba		(substituted off) 70'
CM	24	(France) Corentin Tolisso
CM	6	(Spain) Thiago		(substituted off) 80'
CM	18	(Germany) Leon Goretzka
RW	25	(Germany) Thomas Müller		(substituted off) 66'
CF	9	(Poland) Robert Lewandowski	(yellow card) 59'
LW	29	(France) Kingsley Coman
Substitutes:
GK	26	(Germany) Sven Ulreich
GK	39	(Germany) Ron-Thorben Hoffmann
DF	5	(France) Benjamin Pavard		(substituted on) 80'
MF	19	(Canada) Alphonso Davies		(substituted on) 66'
MF	28	(New Zealand) Sarpreet Singh
MF	30	(Luxembourg) Ryan Johansson
MF	35	(Portugal) Renato Sanches		(substituted on) 70'
FW	15	(Germany) Jann-Fiete Arp
Manager:
(Croatia) Niko Kovač

Man of the Match:
Jadon Sancho (Borussia Dortmund)

Assistant referees:
Rafael Foltyn (Wiesbaden)
Jan Seidel (Oberkrämer)
Fourth official:
Harm Osmers (Hanover)
Video assistant referee:
Robert Schröder (Hanover)
Assistant video assistant referee:
Christof Günsch (Berlin)

**Match rules**

- 90 minutes.
- Penalty shoot-out if scores level.
- Nine named substitutes, of which up to three may be used.

=== Statistics ===
Statistic	Borussia Dortmund	Bayern Munich
Goals scored	2	0
Total shots	5	16
Shots on target	4	7
Saves	7	2
Ball possession	35%	65%
Corner kicks	2	8
Fouls committed	2	13
Offsides	1	1
Yellow cards	0	2
Red cards	0	0

== See also ==
- 2019–20 Bundesliga
- 2019–20 DFB-Pokal
