= 2024 UEFA Champions League final =

Football match in London, England

- Match programme cover
- Event: 2023–24 UEFA Champions League
Borussia Dortmund	Real Madrid
(Germany)	(Spain)
0	2
- Date: 1 June 2024
- Venue: Wembley Stadium, London
- Man of the Match: Dani Carvajal (Real Madrid)
- Referee: Slavko Vinčić (Slovenia)
- Attendance: 86,212
- Weather: Cloudy; 18 °C (64 °F); 54% humidity

The 2024 UEFA Champions League final was the final match of the 2023–24 UEFA Champions League, the 69th season of Europe's premier club football tournament organised by UEFA, and the 32nd season since it was renamed from the European Champion Clubs' Cup to the UEFA Champions League. It was held at Wembley Stadium in London, England, on 1 June 2024, between German club Borussia Dortmund and Spanish club Real Madrid. Due to the postponement and relocation of the 2020 final, the final hosts were shifted back a year, with London instead hosting the 2024 final.

Real Madrid won the match 2–0 for a record-extending 15th title, and their sixth in eleven seasons. As winners, they earned a spot to play in the 2024 UEFA Super Cup, against the winners of the 2023–24 UEFA Europa League, Atalanta. They also earned a chance to compete in the inaugural edition of the FIFA Intercontinental Cup. As they had already qualified for the 2025 FIFA Club World Cup by winning the same tournament in 2022, the spot intended for the winners was redistributed via the UEFA club ranking, with Dortmund claiming one of those spots.

== Background ==
For Borussia Dortmund, this was their third UEFA Champions League final appearance, the first since the 1–2 Der Klassiker loss against Bayern Munich in 2013, which was also held at Wembley Stadium, and the first European final for manager Edin Terzić. Additionally, Dortmund played one European Cup Winners' Cup final (winning in 1966) and two UEFA Cup finals (losing in 1993 and 2002).

Real Madrid played in a record-extending 18th European Cup/UEFA Champions League final, and their second in three years. They previously won 14 finals (in 1956, 1957, 1958, 1959, 1960, 1966, 1998, 2000, 2002, 2014, 2016, 2017, 2018 and 2022) and lost three (1962, 1964 and 1981). Their manager Carlo Ancelotti reached a record-extending sixth UEFA Champions League final as manager, winning in 2003 and 2007 and losing in 2005 while in charge of Milan, and winning the 2014 and 2022 finals with Real Madrid. Real Madrid also played in two European Cup Winners' Cup finals (losing in 1971 and 1983) and two UEFA Cup finals (winning in 1985 and 1986).

This was the first Champions League final between the two clubs, and their first meeting in European competitions since the 2017–18 Champions League group stage encounters, when Madrid won 3–1 away and 3–2 at home. Of their previous fourteen encounters, Dortmund won three matches, Real won six matches and five finished as a draw.

Until the semi-finals, Borussia Dortmund had the best defence in the 2023–24 Champions League with six clean sheets and eight goals conceded. In contrast, Real Madrid goalkeepers had the most goal-scoring opportunities to prevent in the same season.

=== Previous finals ===
In the following table, finals until 1992 were in the European Cup era, since 1993 were in the UEFA Champions League era.

Team	Previous final appearances (bold indicates winners)
(Germany) Borussia Dortmund	2 (**1997**, 2013)
(Spain) Real Madrid	17 (**1956**, **1957**, **1958**, **1959**, **1960**, 1962, 1964, **1966**, 1981, **1998**, **2000**, **2002**, **2014**, **2016**, **2017**, **2018**, **2022**)

== Venue ==
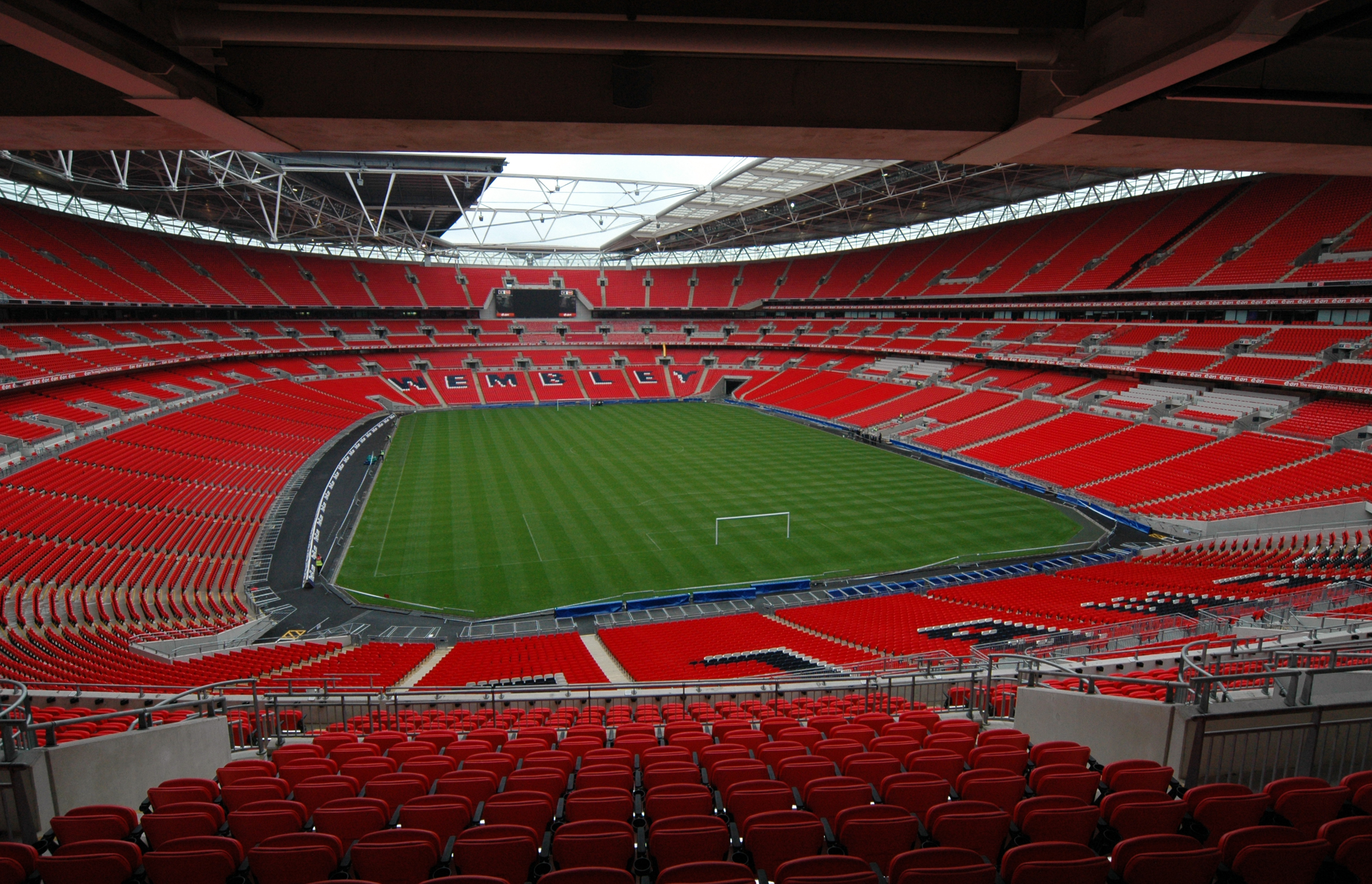
Wembley Stadium in London hosted the final.

This was the third UEFA Champions League final to take place at the rebuilt Wembley Stadium, having previously been held in 2011 and 2013. Overall, it was the eighth final to be held in London, with the other five matches taking place at the original Wembley Stadium in 1963, 1968, 1971, 1978, and 1992. The match was the ninth European Cup final held in England, with the 2003 final having been held at Old Trafford in Manchester, equalling the record of nine European Cup finals held in each of Italy, Germany and Spain. It was also the thirteenth held in the United Kingdom, with the 1960, 1976 and 2002 finals held in Scotland and the 2017 final held in Wales. Wembley Stadium was also a host venue at UEFA Euro 2020, with eight matches played at the stadium including the semi-finals and final.

=== Host selection ===
An open bidding process was launched on 22 February 2019 by UEFA to select the 2022 and 2023 UEFA Champions League final venues. Associations had until 22 March 2019 to express interest, and bid dossiers had to be submitted by 1 July 2019.

The Football Association was reported to have bid with Wembley Stadium in London to host the 2023 final, in order to mark the centenary of the opening of the original stadium in 1923. Wembley Stadium was selected by the UEFA Executive Committee during their meeting in Ljubljana, Slovenia, on 24 September 2019, where the hosts for the 2021 and 2022 UEFA Champions League finals were also appointed.

On 17 June 2020, the UEFA Executive Committee announced that due to the postponement and relocation of the 2020 final, London would instead host the 2024 final.

== Route to the final ==
Note: In all results below, the score of the finalist is given first (H: home; A: away).

(Germany) Borussia Dortmund				Round	(Spain) Real Madrid			
Opponent	Result			Group stage	Opponent	Result		
(France) Paris Saint-Germain	0–2 (A)			Matchday 1	(Germany) Union Berlin	1–0 (H)		
(Italy) Milan	0–0 (H)			Matchday 2	(Italy) Napoli	3–2 (A)		
(England) Newcastle United	1–0 (A)			Matchday 3	(Portugal) Braga	2–1 (A)		
(England) Newcastle United	2–0 (H)			Matchday 4	(Portugal) Braga	3–0 (H)		
(Italy) Milan	3–1 (A)			Matchday 5	(Italy) Napoli	4–2 (H)		
(France) Paris Saint-Germain	1–1 (H)			Matchday 6	(Germany) Union Berlin	3–2 (A)		
Group F winners: Pos / Team / Pld / Pts; 1 / (Germany) Borussia Dortmund / 6 / 11; 2 / (France) Paris Saint-Germain / 6 / 8; 3 / (Italy) Milan / 6 / 8; 4 / (England) Newcastle United / 6 / 5; Source: UEFA				Final standings	Group C winners: Pos / Team / Pld / Pts; 1 / (Spain) Real Madrid / 6 / 18; 2 / (Italy) Napoli / 6 / 10; 3 / (Portugal) Braga / 6 / 4; 4 / (Germany) Union Berlin / 6 / 2; Source: UEFA			
Opponent	Agg.	1st leg	2nd leg	Knockout phase	Opponent	Agg.	1st leg	2nd leg
(Netherlands) PSV Eindhoven	3–1	1–1 (A)	2–0 (H)	Round of 16	(Germany) RB Leipzig	2–1	1–0 (A)	1–1 (H)
(Spain) Atlético Madrid	5–4	1–2 (A)	4–2 (H)	Quarter-finals	(England) Manchester City	4–4 (4–3 p)	3–3 (H)	1–1 (a.e.t.) (A)
(France) Paris Saint-Germain	2–0	1–0 (H)	1–0 (A)	Semi-finals	(Germany) Bayern Munich	4–3	2–2 (A)	2–1 (H)

=== Borussia Dortmund ===
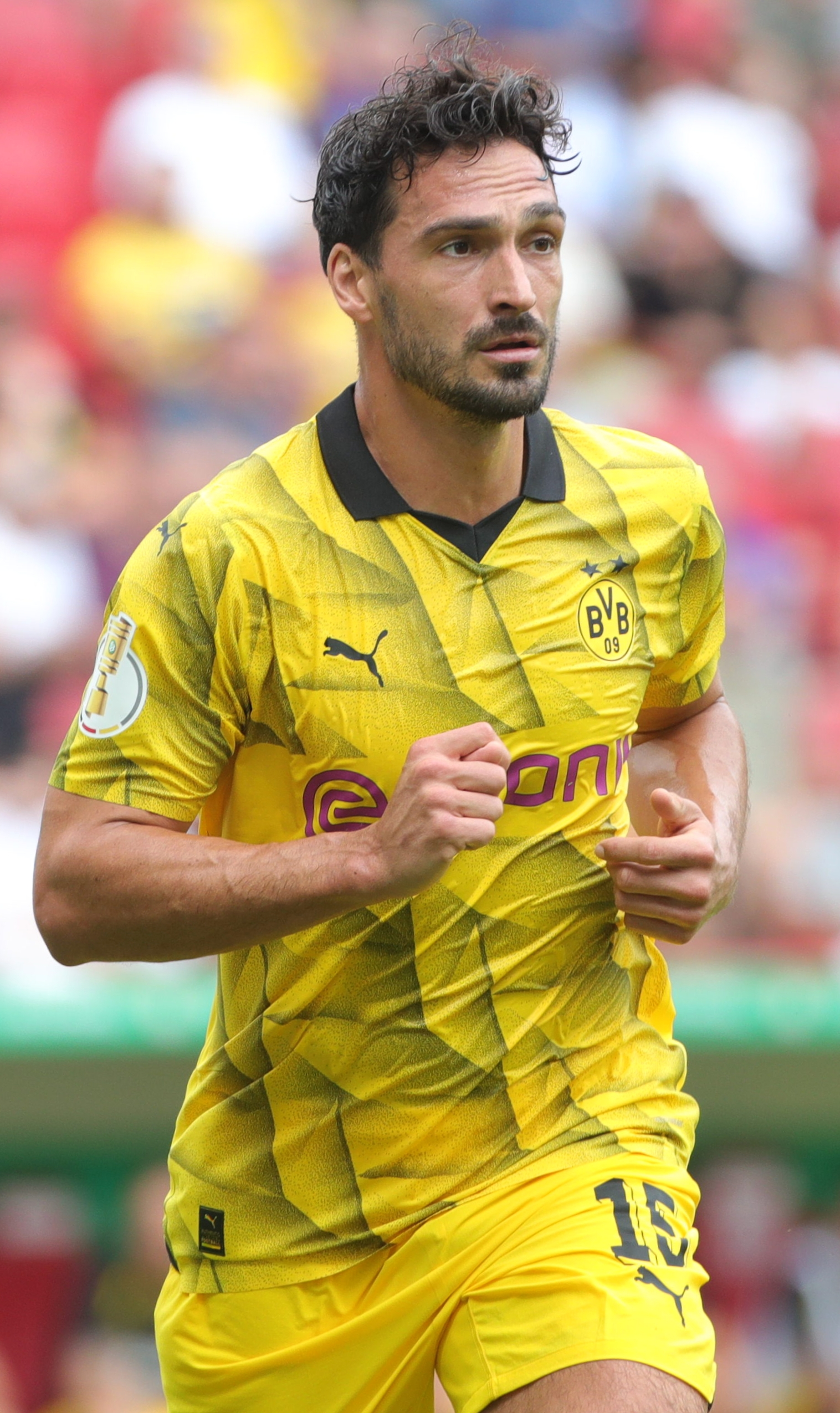
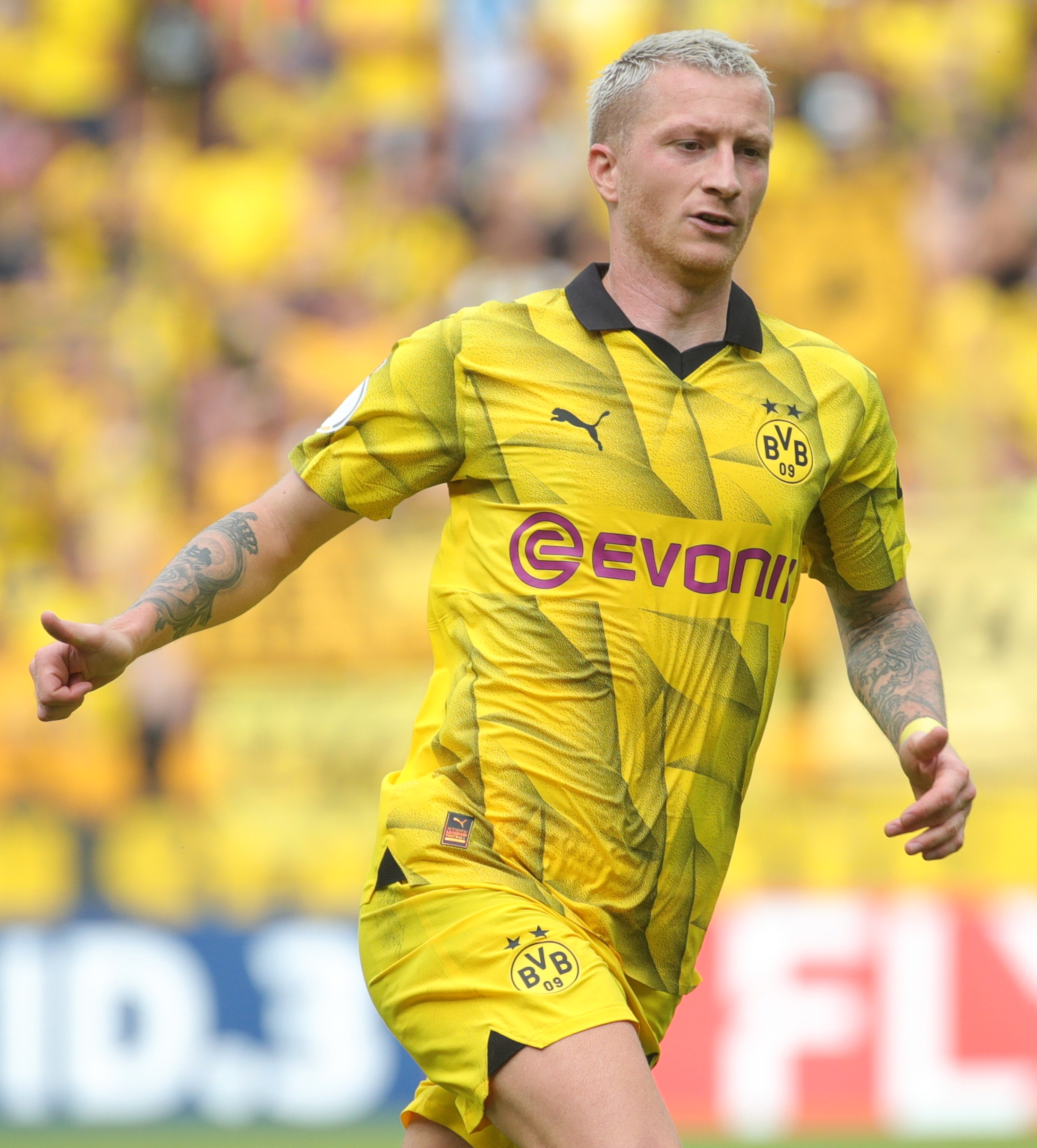
Borussia Dortmund defender Mats Hummels (left) and midfielder Marco Reus (right) were the only players from the club's 2013 final squad; Hummels scored the winner in the second leg of the semi-final against Paris Saint-Germain to book their place in the final, which was the last match for the club for both of them.

Borussia Dortmund qualified for the Champions League group stage by finishing as runners-up in the 2022–23 Bundesliga. In the group stage, they were drawn into Group F, alongside Ligue 1 winners Paris Saint-Germain, Serie A fourth-place team Milan and Premier League fourth-place side Newcastle United, which was widely regarded as the 'group of death'.

In Dortmund's opener of the group stage, they faced Paris Saint-Germain at the Parc des Princes and lost 0–2, with goals from Kylian Mbappé and Achraf Hakimi. On matchday 2, Dortmund drew in a 0–0 stalemate at the Westfalenstadion against Milan. On matchday 3, Dortmund defeated Newcastle United away from home 1–0, with a goal from Felix Nmecha. On matchday 4, Dortmund won 2–0 over Newcastle United at home, with goals coming from Niclas Füllkrug and Julian Brandt. On matchday 5, Dortmund got a 3–1 win against Milan at the San Siro, with goals by Marco Reus, Jamie Bynoe-Gittens and Karim Adeyemi, as Samuel Chukwueze got the temporary equaliser for the hosts. On matchday 6, returning to the Westfalenstadion, the hosts held Paris Saint-Germain to a 1–1 draw, with a goal from Adeyemi and a strike from Warren Zaïre-Emery for the visitors.

In the round of 16, Dortmund were drawn against Dutch club PSV Eindhoven. In the first leg held at the Philips Stadion, Dortmund drew 1–1, with goals from Donyell Malen and Luuk de Jong. In the reverse leg, Dortmund defeated PSV 2–0, with goals from Jadon Sancho and Reus, to win 3–1 on aggregate and advance to the quarter-finals.

In the quarter-finals, Dortmund were drawn against Spanish side Atlético Madrid. In the first leg, at the Metropolitano Stadium, the Germans suffered a 1–2 loss, with goals being scored by Rodrigo De Paul, Samuel Lino and Sébastien Haller, whose late goal rescued Dortmund's chances for the progression. In the second leg, Dortmund produced a 4–2 win at home, trailing down 3–4 on aggregate in the second half and qualifying to the semi-finals 5–4 on aggregate, as Brandt, Ian Maatsen, Füllkrug, Marcel Sabitzer, Mats Hummels (own goal) and Ángel Correa got on the scoresheet.

In the semi-finals, Dortmund were drawn against Paris Saint-Germain, making it a rematch of this season's group stage clash. In the first leg, at the Westfalenstadion, a lone winner from Füllkrug gave Dortmund a 1–0 victory. In the second leg, at the Parc des Princes, the visitors won 1–0 once again, with the only goal of the match coming from Hummels. Dortmund won 2–0 on aggregate to qualify for their first Champions League final in eleven years.

=== Real Madrid ===
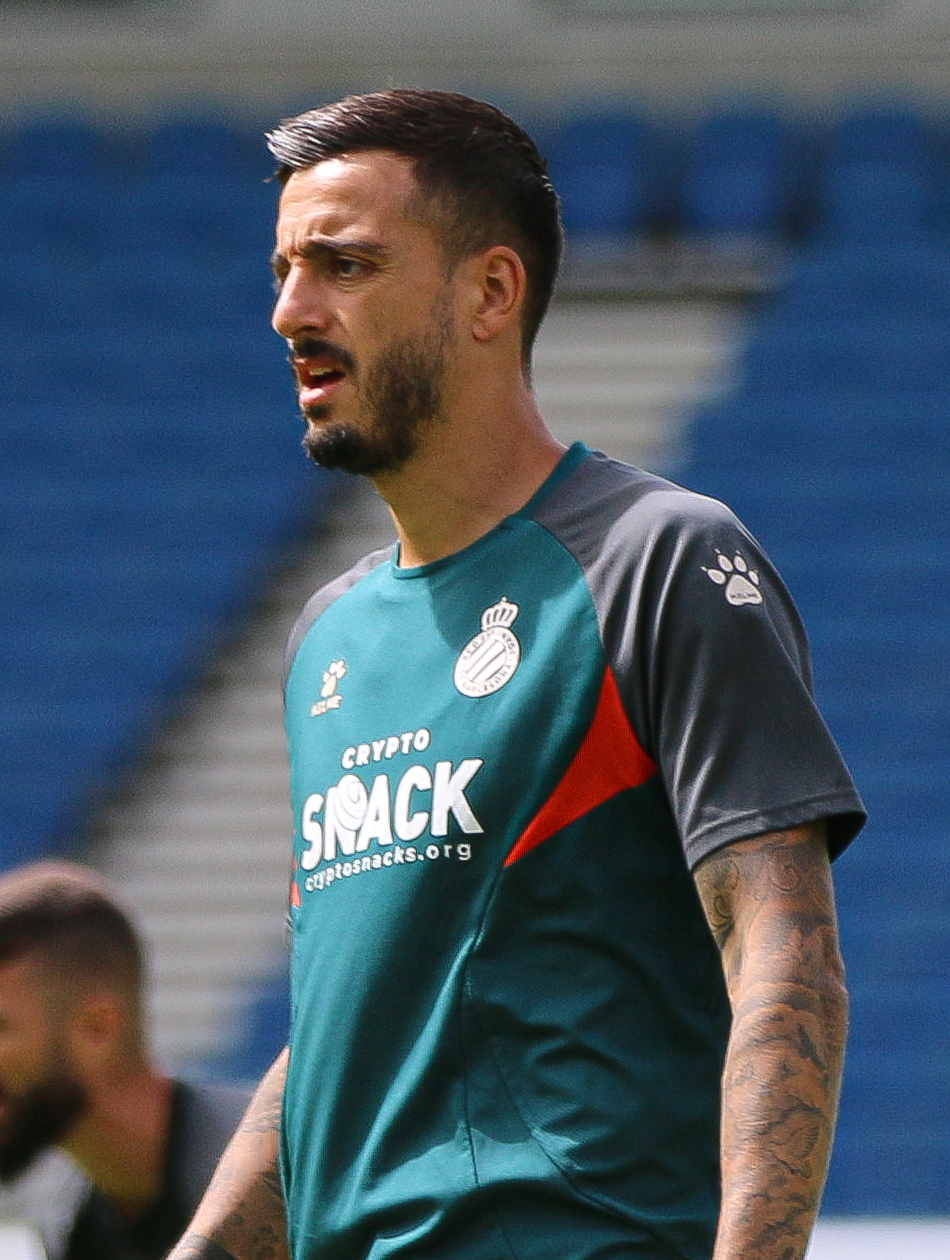
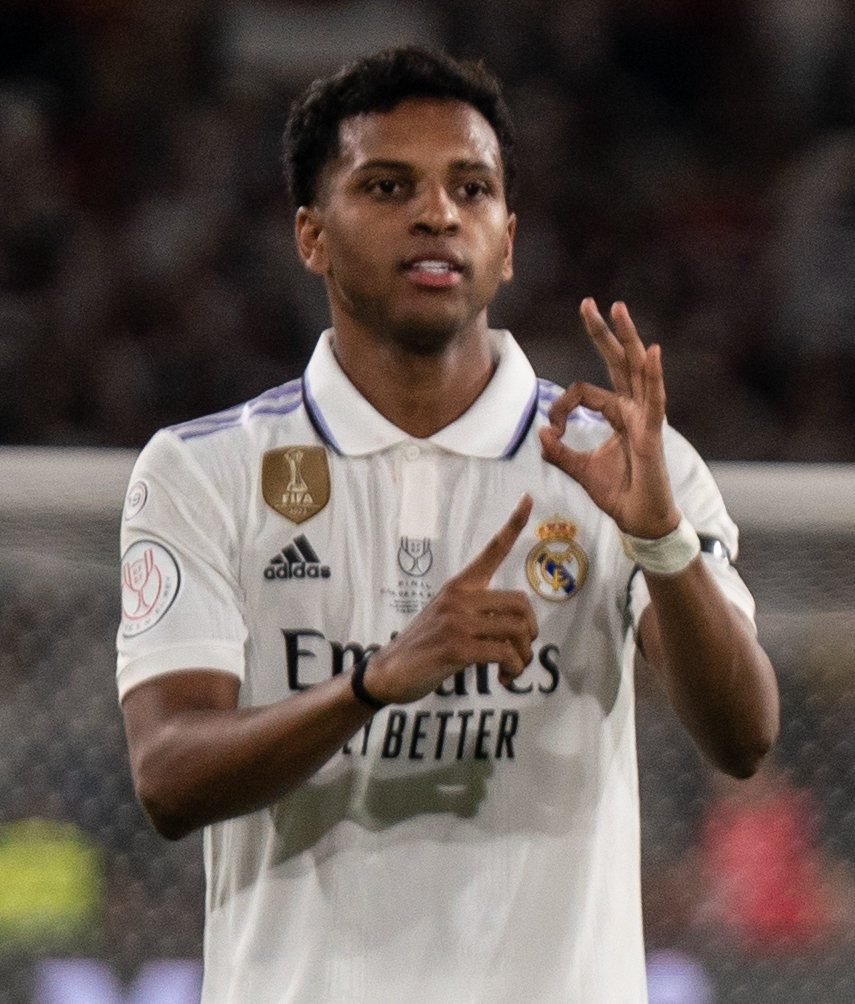
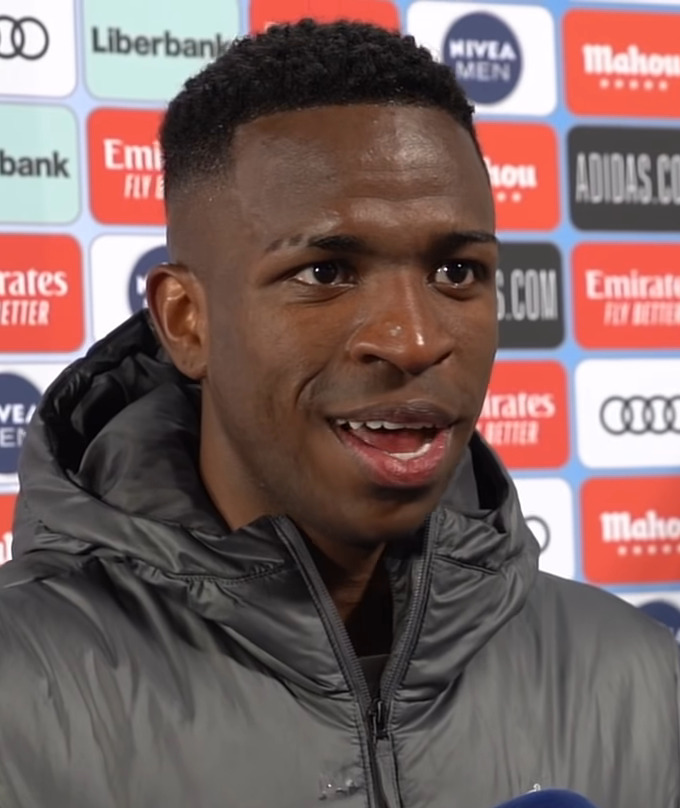
Forward Joselu (left), who was on loan to Real Madrid from Espanyol, scored two late decisive goals in the second leg of the semi-final against Bayern Munich to send Madrid to the final. He and fellow forwards Rodrygo (middle) and Vinícius Júnior (right) were their club's top scorers in the competition with five goals each.

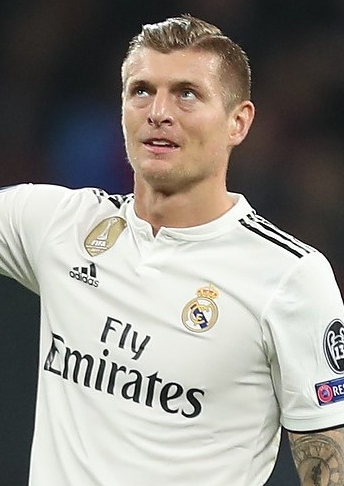
The 2024 UEFA Champions League final marked Real Madrid midfielder Toni Kroos' last club football match and his sixth appearance in the competition's final.

Real Madrid qualified for the Champions League group stage as 2022–23 La Liga runners-up. They were drawn in Group C, alongside reigning Serie A champions Napoli, third placed Primeira Liga team Braga, and fourth placed Bundesliga team Union Berlin.

Madrid went on to end the group stage recording an impressive 6 out of 6 wins in all games. The team opened the group stage at the Santiago Bernabéu against Union Berlin, with a late Jude Bellingham goal sealing a 1–0 win. On matchday 2, the team grabbed a 3–2 away win against Napoli at the Stadio Diego Armando Maradona, with finishes coming from Vinícius Júnior, Bellingham, and an own goal from Napoli goalkeeper Alex Meret, with goals coming from Leo Østigård and Piotr Zieliński for the hosts. On matchday 3, Madrid defeated Braga away 2–1, with Rodrygo and Bellingham on the scoresheet, and Álvaro Djaló scoring for his team. On matchday 4, Madrid dominated Braga 3–0 at home with strikes from Brahim Díaz, Vinícius, and Rodrygo. On matchday 5, Madrid obtained a 4–2 home win against Napoli, with goals coming from Vinícius, Bellingham, Nico Paz, and Joselu, as well as Giovanni Simeone and André-Frank Zambo Anguissa on the scoresheet for the visitors. On matchday 6, they obtained a 3–2 win away against Union Berlin, after a Joselu brace and Dani Ceballos scoring the winner, with strikes from Kevin Volland and Alex Král for the hosts.

In the round of 16, Madrid were drawn against German club RB Leipzig. In the first leg held at the Red Bull Arena, a lone Brahim strike prevailed Madrid to a 1–0 away win. In the second leg, Madrid were held to a 1–1 draw, despite Willi Orbán scoring for his team, Vinícius's goal was enough for Madrid to advance 2–1 on aggregate.

In the quarter-finals, Madrid were drawn against English champions and reigning UEFA Champions League winners Manchester City for the third consecutive season. The first leg at the Santiago Bernabéu ended in an intense 3–3 draw, in which goals from Bernardo Silva, Phil Foden, and Joško Gvardiol were denied by replies from a Rúben Dias own goal, Rodrygo, and Federico Valverde. The second leg at the City of Manchester Stadium also ended in a draw, as Rodrygo's early goal was cancelled out by a Kevin De Bruyne equaliser. The match ended 1–1 after extra time and went into the penalty shootout to decide the winner after a 4–4 aggregate draw. It was Madrid's first Champions League shootout since the 2016 final. Goalkeeper Andriy Lunin saved two crucial penalties from Silva and Mateo Kovačić, with only Luka Modrić missing his spot kick for the visitors, while Antonio Rüdiger scored the decisive final penalty to send his team to the semi-finals.

In the semi-finals, Madrid were drawn against German champions Bayern Munich, the first "European Clásico" since the 2017–18 UEFA Champions League season. In the first leg at the Allianz Arena, a Vinícius double cancelled goals coming from Leroy Sané and Harry Kane for the hosts for a 2–2 draw. In the second leg at the Santiago Bernabéu, with Madrid initially trailing from an Alphonso Davies goal, Joselu's double in the closing minutes of the game stunned the visitors to bring his team to a 2–1 victory in the match and 4–3 on aggregate, as they progressed to their sixth final in ten years.

== Pre-match ==
=== Identity ===
The visual identity of the 2024 UEFA Champions League final was unveiled at the group stage draw in Monaco on 31 August 2023.

=== Officials ===
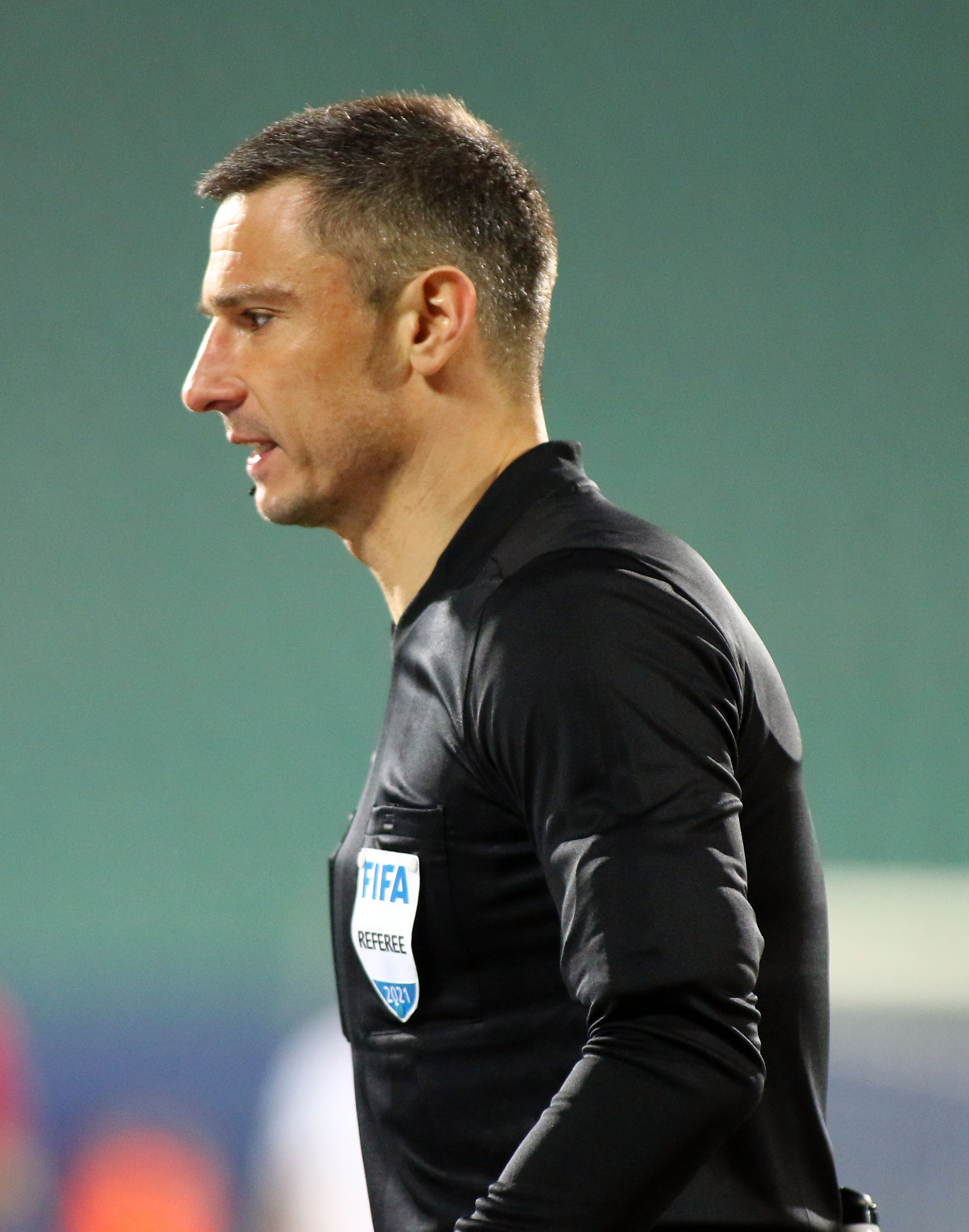
Slovenian referee Slavko Vinčić officiated the final.

On 13 May 2024, Slovenian referee Slavko Vinčić was appointed to take charge of the final by UEFA, along with fellow Slovenes Tomaž Klančnik and Andraž Kovačič as assistant referees, and Nejc Kajtazović as the video assistant referee. The first three officials had previously officiated together in the 2022 UEFA Europa League final. They were joined by fellow countryman Rade Obrenović as assistant VAR and Frenchman François Letexier as the fourth official.

=== Opening ceremony ===
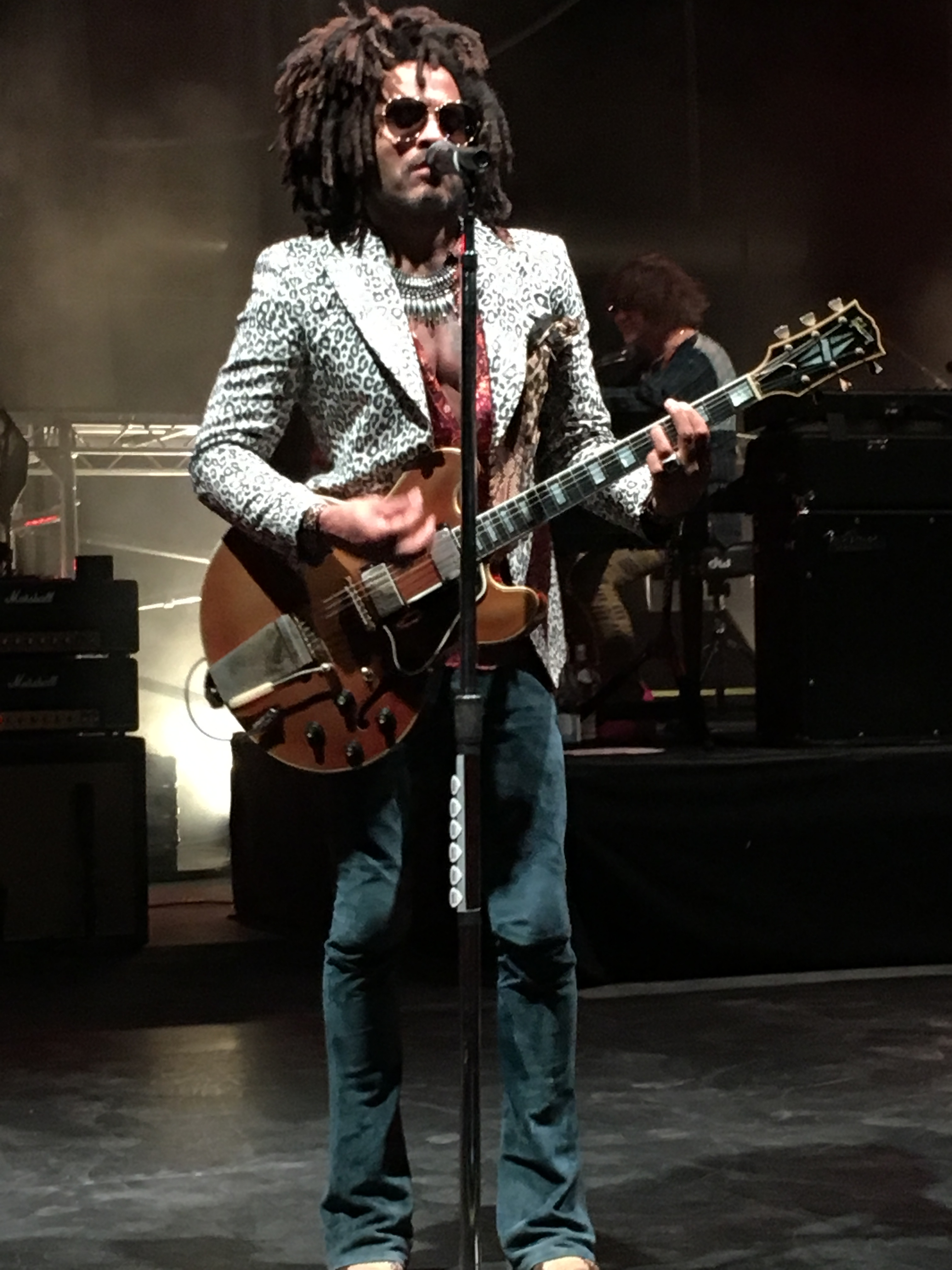
Lenny Kravitz, the headline act of the opening ceremony.

On 16 May 2024, American singer Lenny Kravitz was named as the headline act of the opening ceremony. He performed with his band a medley of his songs: "Fly Away", "Human" and "Are You Gonna Go My Way".

== Match ==
=== Summary ===
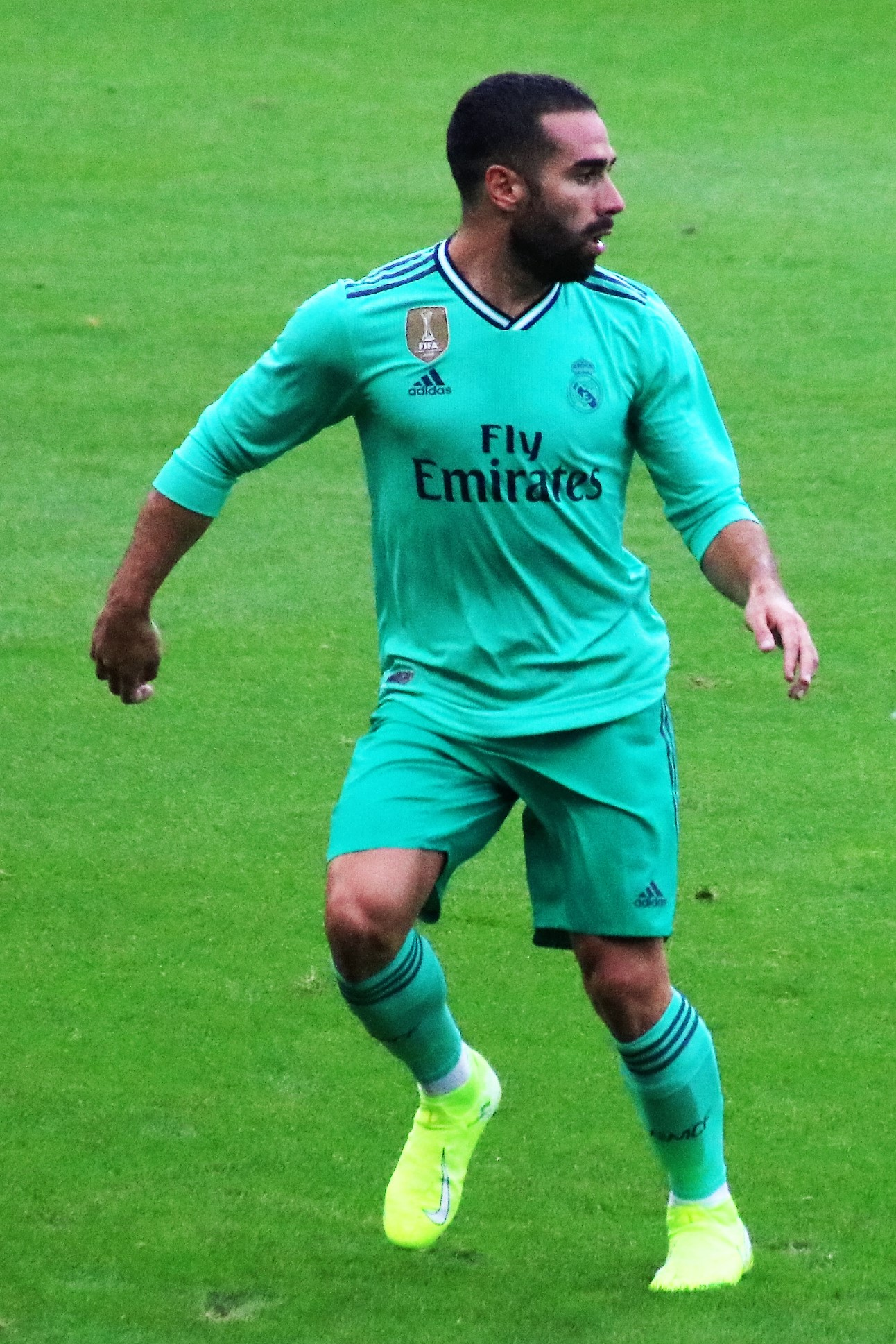
Real Madrid defender Dani Carvajal was named man of the match and became the first defender to score in a final since Sergio Ramos in 2016.

The match kicked off at 20:00 local time with an attendance of 86,212 fans. In the 21st minute, Mats Hummels played a pass to Karim Adeyemi, who rounded Thibaut Courtois by nudging the ball to the goalkeeper's right and attempting to shoot, but Dani Carvajal tracked back to block his effort. Two minutes later, Adeyemi played a pass through the centre of the Madrid defence and released Niclas Füllkrug, who struck the woodwork. Dortmund then produced a counter-attack after Brandt played a pass to Adeyemi, who was unable to beat Courtois from a tight angle, with the latter stretching out to make the initial parry, before saving Füllkrug's follow-up attempt. There were four minutes of added time after a series of pitch invasions earlier in the match.

Neither side made any lineup changes during the interval. In the 49th minute, Toni Kroos whipped in a free kick towards the Dortmund penalty area, with Carvajal sending his header over the bar. Madrid continued their pressure as Vinícius Júnior whipped a cross towards the penalty area, which Nico Schlotterbeck nodded straight to Carvajal, whose half-volley effort was blocked by Ian Maatsen. Dortmund pushed again for a goal as Adeyemi played a cross into the penalty area towards Füllkrug, who managed to direct a powerful header that was saved by Courtois. Vinícius played another cross from the left flank to former Dortmund midfielder Jude Bellingham, who missed the ball which flew inches wide of the post. Dortmund then made their first substitution of the final, as Adeyemi came off for Marco Reus.

With 15 minutes to go, Carvajal gave Madrid the lead in the 74th minute, heading in Kroos' corner from the left. Madrid had another chance to score, with Eduardo Camavinga cutting the ball back from the byline on the left to Bellingham, who looked to strike the ball past Gregor Kobel, only for Schlotterbeck to block his effort. Dortmund then made two attacking changes, as captain Emre Can and Julian Brandt came off for Donyell Malen and Sébastien Haller. Madrid came close to scoring a second again, as Kobel saved Camavinga's effort from outside the box and Nacho's header from a Kroos corner.

In the 83rd minute, Maatsen played a pass that was intercepted by Bellingham, who teed up Vinícius to his left, with the latter taking a touch and putting the ball past Kobel to double Madrid's lead. Madrid then made their first changes as Bellingham and Kroos came off for Joselu and Luka Modrić. Dortmund made their last substitution, with Jadon Sancho brought off for Jamie Bynoe-Gittens. Dortmund thought they had pulled one back, as Malen played a cross into the penalty area to Füllkrug, who powered a header into the left-hand side of the net, leaving Courtois with no chance. However, the goal was immediately disallowed by the referee after Füllkrug was shown to be in an offside position. Madrid made their two other substitutions in stoppage time, with Rodrygo and Vinícius brought off for Éder Militão and Lucas Vázquez. The match ended after five minutes of stoppage time, with Madrid winning 2–0.

=== Details ===
The "home" team (for administrative purposes) was determined by an additional draw held after the quarter-final and semi-final draws.

1 June 2024
20:00 UTC+1

Borussia Dortmund (Germany)	0–2	(Spain) Real Madrid
	Report	Carvajal 74'; Vinícius 83'

Wembley Stadium, London
Attendance: 86,212
Referee: Slavko Vinčić (Slovenia)

Borussia Dortmund	Real Madrid

GK	1	(Switzerland) Gregor Kobel
RB	26	(Norway) Julian Ryerson
CB	15	(Germany) Mats Hummels	(yellow card) 79'
CB	4	(Germany) Nico Schlotterbeck	(yellow card) 40'
LB	22	(Netherlands) Ian Maatsen
CM	23	(Germany) Emre Can (c)		(substituted off) 80'
CM	20	(Austria) Marcel Sabitzer	(yellow card) 43'
RW	10	(England) Jadon Sancho		(substituted off) 87'
AM	19	(Germany) Julian Brandt		(substituted off) 80'
LW	27	(Germany) Karim Adeyemi		(substituted off) 72'
CF	14	(Germany) Niclas Füllkrug
Substitutes:
GK	33	(Germany) Alexander Meyer
GK	35	(Poland) Marcel Lotka
DF	25	(Germany) Niklas Süle
MF	6	(Turkey) Salih Özcan
MF	8	(Germany) Felix Nmecha
MF	11	(Germany) Marco Reus		(substituted on) 72'
MF	17	(Germany) Marius Wolf
MF	38	(Germany) Kjell Wätjen
MF	43	(England) Jamie Bynoe-Gittens		(substituted on) 87'
FW	9	(Ivory Coast) Sébastien Haller		(substituted on) 80'
FW	18	(Germany) Youssoufa Moukoko
FW	21	(Netherlands) Donyell Malen		(substituted on) 80'
Manager:
(Germany) Edin Terzić

GK	1	(Belgium) Thibaut Courtois
RB	2	(Spain) Dani Carvajal
CB	22	(Germany) Antonio Rüdiger
CB	6	(Spain) Nacho (c)
LB	23	(France) Ferland Mendy
DM	12	(France) Eduardo Camavinga
CM	15	(Uruguay) Federico Valverde
CM	8	(Germany) Toni Kroos		(substituted off) 85'
AM	5	(England) Jude Bellingham		(substituted off) 85'
CF	11	(Brazil) Rodrygo		(substituted off) 90'
CF	7	(Brazil) Vinícius Júnior	(yellow card) 35'	(substituted off) 90+4'
Substitutes:
GK	13	(Ukraine) Andriy Lunin
GK	25	(Spain) Kepa Arrizabalaga
DF	3	(Brazil) Éder Militão		(substituted on) 90'
DF	4	(Austria) David Alaba
DF	17	(Spain) Lucas Vázquez		(substituted on) 90+4'
DF	20	(Spain) Fran García
MF	10	(Croatia) Luka Modrić		(substituted on) 85'
MF	18	(France) Aurélien Tchouaméni
MF	19	(Spain) Dani Ceballos
MF	21	(Morocco) Brahim Díaz
MF	24	(Turkey) Arda Güler
FW	14	(Spain) Joselu		(substituted on) 85'
Manager:
(Italy) Carlo Ancelotti

Man of the Match:
Dani Carvajal (Real Madrid)

Assistant referees:
Tomaž Klančnik (Slovenia)
Andraž Kovačič (Slovenia)
Fourth official:
François Letexier (France)
Reserve assistant referee:
Cyril Mugnier (France)
Video assistant referee:
Nejc Kajtazović (Slovenia)
Assistant video assistant referee:
Rade Obrenović (Slovenia)
Support video assistant referee:
Massimiliano Irrati (Italy)

Match rules

- 90 minutes
- 30 minutes of extra time if necessary
- Penalty shoot-out if scores still level
- Maximum of twelve named substitutes
- Maximum of five substitutions, with a sixth allowed in extra time
- Maximum of three substitution opportunities, with a fourth allowed in extra time

=== Statistics ===
First half
Statistic	Borussia Dortmund	Real Madrid
Goals scored	0	0
Total shots	8	2
Shots on target	2	0
Saves	0	2
Ball possession	40%	60%
Corner kicks	5	1
Fouls committed	8	3
Offsides	0	0
Yellow cards	2	1
Red cards	0	0

Second half
Statistic	Borussia Dortmund	Real Madrid
Goals scored	0	2
Total shots	5	11
Shots on target	1	6
Saves	4	1
Ball possession	54%	46%
Corner kicks	4	7
Fouls committed	4	5
Offsides	1	0
Yellow cards	1	0
Red cards	0	0

Overall
Statistic	Borussia Dortmund	Real Madrid
Goals scored	0	2
Total shots	13	13
Shots on target	3	6
Saves	4	3
Ball possession	46%	54%
Corner kicks	9	8
Fouls committed	12	8
Offsides	1	0
Yellow cards	3	1
Red cards	0	0

== Post-match ==
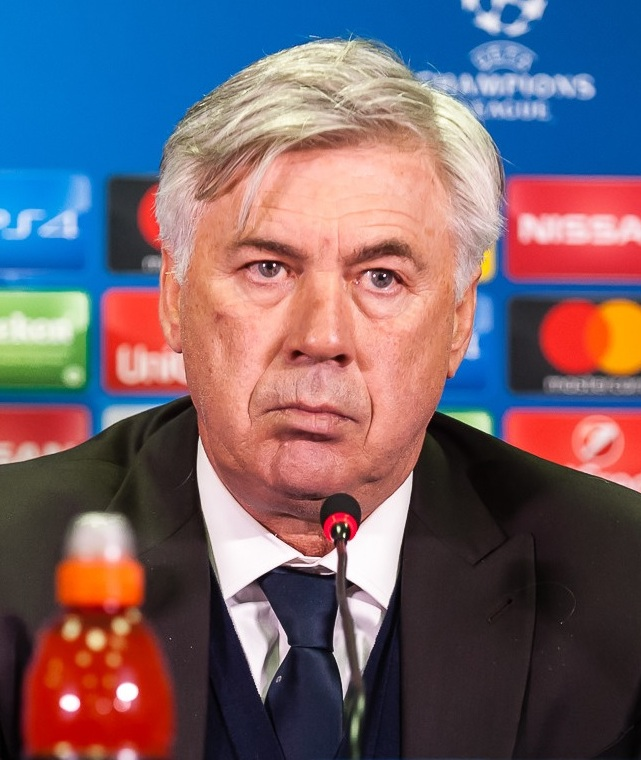
Real Madrid's Carlo Ancelotti won his fifth Champions League title as a manager and seventh overall.

With the win, Real Madrid secured their record-extending 15th European Cup/Champions League title, and their sixth in the previous eleven seasons. It maintained Madrid's perfect final record in the Champions League era with nine wins, having last lost the final in 1981. Madrid won the Champions League unbeaten for the first time, with nine wins and four draws. They also completed their fifth European double (after 1956–57, 1957–58, 2016–17 and 2021–22), having won the 2023–24 La Liga.

Four Madrid players (Dani Carvajal, Toni Kroos, Luka Modrić, and Nacho) equalled Paco Gento's record of winning six European Cup/Champions League titles; all but Kroos have won all six of their titles with Real. In addition, Carvajal joined Gento as the only players to start in six different winning finals in the competition. Madrid manager Carlo Ancelotti extended his record as the most successful manager in the competition's history, with his fifth title, and his third in charge of Los Blancos.

Meanwhile, Borussia Dortmund manager Edin Terzić stepped down from his role on 13 June 2024, nearly two weeks after losing the final. He stated that after the final, he asked for a meeting with the club's senior management team because he felt that "the club's new era should begin with a new man on the touchline", and wished Dortmund the very best. The next day, Terzić's assistant and former Dortmund player Nuri Şahin was appointed as head coach on a three-year contract.

=== Crime ===
After the game, the Metropolitan Police said that over 2,000 officers had been on duty for the game. 53 arrests had been made, mainly for trying to enter the stadium without a ticket and five arrests for entering the field of play. The game had only just kicked off when pitch invaders approached a number of the players.

Three people were later charged with entering the field of play contrary to Section 4 of the Football (Offences) Act 1991. Their court appearances were arranged for June and July 2024. The police said that most attempts to gain access to the ground without a ticket had been thwarted following an investment of £5 million, on new security lanes, improved fencing, additional stewards and ticket checks and their increased enforcement of the public spaces protection order, carried out after the mass unrest at the Euro 2020 final in July 2021. A Russian vlogger, Andrey Burim, was later reported to have offered 30 million rubles to anyone who entered the pitch with his handle on their t-shirts. On 3 June, a Ukrainian man pled guilty at Westminster Magistrates' Court to entering the field of play and admitted he was inspired by Andrey Burim. He was fined £1,000, which was cut to £660 following his guilty plea. He was also ordered to pay £85 costs and a £264 witness surcharge.

== Broadcasting ==
In Spain, the final was broadcast by Televisión Española (TVE), with an average of 6.1 million viewers (48.8% of share) and a peak of 7.3 million (52.5% of share) at 22:44 CEST. In total, at least 10.4 million unique viewers watched the match at some point. In addition, public streaming service RTVE Play gathered almost 800,000 unique viewers, with a total of 1.5 million views. Post-match celebrations were followed by 3.2 million people. Likewise, the Movistar Plus+ subscription platform broadcast the match, gathering 655,000 viewers.

== See also ==
- 2024 UEFA Europa League final
- 2024 UEFA Europa Conference League final
- 2024 UEFA Women's Champions League final
- 2023–24 Borussia Dortmund season
- 2023–24 Real Madrid CF season
- Borussia Dortmund in international football
- Real Madrid CF in international football
