= 2023–24 UEFA Europa League knockout phase =

Phase of the 53rd UEFA Europa League

The 2023–24 UEFA Europa League knockout phase began on 15 February with the knockout round play-offs and ended on 22 May 2024 with the final at the Aviva Stadium in Dublin, Republic of Ireland, to decide the champions of the 2023–24 UEFA Europa League. A total of 24 teams competed in the knockout phase.

Times are CET/CEST, (Note: CET (UTC+1) for dates up to 25 March 2023 (round of 16), and CEST (UTC+2) for dates thereafter (quarter-finals, semi-finals and final).) as listed by UEFA (local times, if different, are in parentheses).

== Qualified teams ==
The knockout phase involved 24 teams: the 16 teams which qualified as winners and runners-up of each of the eight groups in the group stage, and the eight third-placed teams from the Champions League group stage.

=== Europa League group stage winners and runners-up ===
| Group | Winners (advance to round of 16 and seeded in draw) | Runners-up (advance to KO play-offs and seeded in draw) |
|---|---|---|
| A | (England) West Ham United | (Germany) SC Freiburg |
| B | (England) Brighton & Hove Albion | (France) Marseille |
| C | (Scotland) Rangers | (Czech Republic) Sparta Prague |
| D | (Italy) Atalanta | (Portugal) Sporting CP |
| E | (England) Liverpool | (France) Toulouse |
| F | (Spain) Villarreal | (France) Rennes |
| G | (Czech Republic) Slavia Prague | (Italy) Roma |
| H | (Germany) Bayer Leverkusen | (Azerbaijan) Qarabağ |

=== Champions League group stage third-placed teams ===
| Group | Third-placed teams (advance to KO play-offs and unseeded in draw) |
|---|---|
| A | (Turkey) Galatasaray |
| B | (France) Lens |
| C | (Portugal) Braga |
| D | (Portugal) Benfica |
| E | (Netherlands) Feyenoord |
| F | (Italy) Milan |
| G | (Switzerland) Young Boys |
| H | (Ukraine) Shakhtar Donetsk |

== Format ==
Each tie in the knockout phase, apart from the final, was played over two legs, with each team playing one leg at home. The team that scored more goals on aggregate over the two legs advanced to the next round. If the aggregate score was level, then 30 minutes of extra time were played (the away goals rule was not applied). If the score was still level at the end of extra time, the winners were decided by a penalty shoot-out. In the final, which was played as a single match, if the score was level at the end of normal time, extra time was played, followed by a penalty shoot-out if the score was still level. The mechanism of the draws for each round was as follows:

- In the draw for the knockout round play-offs, the eight group runners-up were seeded, and the eight Champions League group third-placed teams were unseeded. The seeded teams were drawn against the unseeded teams, with the seeded teams hosting the second leg. Teams from the same association could not be drawn against each other.
- In the draw for the round of 16, the eight group winners were seeded, and the eight winners of the knockout round play-offs were unseeded. Again, the seeded teams were drawn against the unseeded teams, with the seeded teams hosting the second leg. Teams from the same association could not be drawn against each other.
- In the draws for the quarter-finals onwards, there were no seedings, and teams from the same association could be drawn against each other. As the draws for the quarter-finals and semi-finals were held together before the quarter-finals were played, the identity of the quarter-final winners was not known at the time of the semi-final draw. A draw was also held to determine which semi-final winner would be designated as the "home" team for the final (for administrative purposes as it was played at a neutral venue).

In the knockout phase, teams from the same or nearby cities (Benfica and Sporting CP) were not scheduled to play at home on the same day, due to logistics and crowd control. To avoid such scheduling conflicts, adjustments had to be made by UEFA. For the knockout round play-offs and a round of 16, if the two teams are in the same seeding pot and must play at home for the same leg, the home match of the team that was not domestic cup champions in the qualifying season, or the team with the lower domestic ranking (if neither team were the domestic cup champions, i.e. Sporting CP for this season), was moved from Thursday to Wednesday. For the quarter-finals and semi-finals, if the two teams were drawn to play at home for the same leg, the order of legs of the tie involving the team with the lowest priority would be reversed from the original draw.

== Bracket ==
Knockout round play-offs
(Portugal) Benfica | 2 | 0 | 2
(France) Toulouse | 1 | 0 | 1
(Ukraine) Shakhtar Donetsk | 2 | 1 | 3
(France) Marseille | 2 | 3 | 5
(Turkey) Galatasaray | 3 | 1 | 4
(Czech Republic) Sparta Prague | 2 | 4 | 6
(Switzerland) Young Boys | 1 | 1 | 2
(Portugal) Sporting CP | 3 | 1 | 4
(Italy) Milan | 3 | 2 | 5
(France) Rennes | 0 | 3 | 3
(Netherlands) Feyenoord | 1 | 1 | 2 (2)
(Italy) Roma (p) | 1 | 1 | 2 (4)
(Portugal) Braga | 2 | 3 | 5
(Azerbaijan) Qarabağ (a.e.t.) | 4 | 2 | 6
(France) Lens | 0 | 2 | 2
(Germany) SC Freiburg (a.e.t.) | 0 | 3 | 3

Round of 16
(Portugal) Benfica | 2 | 1 | 3
(Scotland) Rangers | 2 | 0 | 2
(France) Marseille | 4 | 1 | 5
(Spain) Villarreal | 0 | 3 | 3
(Czech Republic) Sparta Prague | 1 | 1 | 2
(England) Liverpool | 5 | 6 | 11
(Portugal) Sporting CP | 1 | 1 | 2
(Italy) Atalanta | 1 | 2 | 3
(Italy) Milan | 4 | 3 | 7
(Czech Republic) Slavia Prague | 2 | 1 | 3
(Italy) Roma | 4 | 0 | 4
(England) Brighton & Hove Albion | 0 | 1 | 1
(Azerbaijan) Qarabağ | 2 | 2 | 4
(Germany) Bayer Leverkusen | 2 | 3 | 5
(Germany) SC Freiburg | 1 | 0 | 1
(England) West Ham United | 0 | 5 | 5

Quarter-finals
(Portugal) Benfica | 2 | 0 | 2 (2)
(France) Marseille (p) | 1 | 1 | 2 (4)
(England) Liverpool | 0 | 1 | 1
(Italy) Atalanta | 3 | 0 | 3
(Italy) Milan | 0 | 1 | 1
(Italy) Roma | 1 | 2 | 3
(Germany) Bayer Leverkusen | 2 | 1 | 3
(England) West Ham United | 0 | 1 | 1

Semi-finals
(France) Marseille | 1 | 0 | 1
(Italy) Atalanta | 1 | 3 | 4
(Italy) Roma | 0 | 2 | 2
(Germany) Bayer Leverkusen | 2 | 2 | 4

Final
22 May – Dublin
(Italy) Atalanta | 3
(Germany) Bayer Leverkusen | 0

== Knockout round play-offs ==
The draw for the knockout round play-offs was held on 18 December 2023, 13:00 CET.

=== Summary ===
The first legs were played on 15 February, and the second legs were played on 22 February 2024.

| Team 1 | Agg. | Team 2 | 1st leg | 2nd leg |
|---|---|---|---|---|
| Feyenoord (Netherlands) | 2–2 (2–4 p) | (Italy) Roma | 1–1 | 1–1 (a.e.t.) |
| Milan (Italy) | 5–3 | (France) Rennes | 3–0 | 2–3 |
| Lens (France) | 2–3 | (Germany) SC Freiburg | 0–0 | 2–3 (a.e.t.) |
| Young Boys (Switzerland) | 2–4 | (Portugal) Sporting CP | 1–3 | 1–1 |
| Benfica (Portugal) | 2–1 | (France) Toulouse | 2–1 | 0–0 |
| Braga (Portugal) | 5–6 | (Azerbaijan) Qarabağ | 2–4 | 3–2 (a.e.t.) |
| Galatasaray (Turkey) | 4–6 | (Czech Republic) Sparta Prague | 3–2 | 1–4 |
| Shakhtar Donetsk (Ukraine) | 3–5 | (France) Marseille | 2–2 | 1–3 |

=== Matches ===
15 February 2024
18:45

| Feyenoord (Netherlands) | 1–1 | (Italy) Roma |
|---|---|---|
| Paixão 45+1' | Report | Lukaku 67' |

De Kuip, Rotterdam
Attendance: 43,235
Referee: Radu Petrescu (Romania)
22 February 2024
21:00

| Roma (Italy) | 1–1 (a.e.t.) | (Netherlands) Feyenoord |
|---|---|---|
| Pellegrini 15' | Report | Giménez 5' |
Penalties
| Paredes (penalty scored); Lukaku (penalty missed); Cristante (penalty scored); Aouar (penalty scored); Zalewski (penalty scored) | 4–2 | (penalty scored) Ueda; (penalty missed) Hancko; (penalty missed) Jahanbakhsh; (penalty scored) Hartman |

Stadio Olimpico, Rome
Attendance: 67,293
Referee: Jesús Gil Manzano (Spain)

2–2 on aggregate; Roma won 4–2 on penalties.

15 February 2024
21:00

| Milan (Italy) | 3–0 | (France) Rennes |
|---|---|---|
| Loftus-Cheek 32', 47'; Leão 53' | Report |

San Siro, Milan
Attendance: 69,021
Referee: Nikola Dabanović (Montenegro)
22 February 2024
18:45

| Rennes (France) | 3–2 | (Italy) Milan |
|---|---|---|
| Bourigeaud 11', 54' (pen.), 68' (pen.) | Report | Jović 22'; Leão 58' |

Roazhon Park, Rennes
Attendance: 28,320
Referee: João Pinheiro (Portugal)

Milan won 5–3 on aggregate.

15 February 2024
21:00

| Lens (France) | 0–0 | (Germany) SC Freiburg |
|---|---|---|
| | Report |

Stade Bollaert-Delelis, Lens
Attendance: 38,194
Referee: Bartosz Frankowski (Poland)
22 February 2024
18:45

| SC Freiburg (Germany) | 3–2 (a.e.t.) | (France) Lens |
|---|---|---|
| Sallai 67', 90+2'; Gregoritsch 99' | Report | Costa 28'; Wahi 45+2' |

Europa-Park Stadion, Freiburg im Breisgau
Attendance: 33,911
Referee: Rade Obrenović (Slovenia)

SC Freiburg won 3–2 on aggregate.

15 February 2024
18:45

| Young Boys (Switzerland) | 1–3 | (Portugal) Sporting CP |
|---|---|---|
| Ugrinic 42' | Report | Amenda 31' (o.g.); Gyökeres 41' (pen.); Inácio 48' |

Stadion Wankdorf, Bern
Attendance: 31,500
Referee: Benoît Bastien (France)
22 February 2024
21:00 (20:00 UTC+0)

| Sporting CP (Portugal) | 1–1 | (Switzerland) Young Boys |
|---|---|---|
| Gyökeres 13' | Report | Ganvoula 84' (pen.) |

Estádio José Alvalade, Lisbon
Attendance: 29,393
Referee: Ivan Kružliak (Slovakia)

Sporting CP won 4–2 on aggregate.

15 February 2024
21:00 (20:00 UTC+0)

| Benfica (Portugal) | 2–1 | (France) Toulouse |
|---|---|---|
| Di María 68' (pen.), 90+8' (pen.) | Report | Desler 75' |

Estádio da Luz, Lisbon
Attendance: 56,553
Referee: Donatas Rumšas (Lithuania)
22 February 2024
18:45

| Toulouse (France) | 0–0 | (Portugal) Benfica |
|---|---|---|
| | Report |

Stadium de Toulouse, Toulouse
Attendance: 31,810
Referee: Maurizio Mariani (Italy)

Benfica won 2–1 on aggregate.

15 February 2024
21:00 (20:00 UTC+0)

| Braga (Portugal) | 2–4 | (Azerbaijan) Qarabağ |
|---|---|---|
| Banza 44'; Moutinho 90+1' (pen.) | Report | Janković 21' (pen.); Zoubir 54', 69'; Juninho 65' |

Estádio Municipal, Braga
Attendance: 12,122
Referee: Morten Krogh (Denmark)
22 February 2024
18:45 (21:45 UTC+4)

| Qarabağ (Azerbaijan) | 2–3 (a.e.t.) | (Portugal) Braga |
|---|---|---|
| Silva 102'; Akhundzade 120+2' | Report | Fernandes 70'; Djaló 83'; Banza 115' (pen.) |

Tofiq Bahramov Republican Stadium, Baku
Attendance: 31,200
Referee: Georgi Kabakov (Bulgaria)

Qarabağ won 6–5 on aggregate.

15 February 2024
18:45 (20:45 UTC+3)

| Galatasaray (Turkey) | 3–2 | (Czech Republic) Sparta Prague |
|---|---|---|
| Demirbay 19'; Mertens 61'; Icardi 90+1' | Report | Preciado 47'; Kuchta 65' |

Rams Park, Istanbul
Attendance: 46,583
Referee: Alejandro Hernández Hernández (Spain)
22 February 2024
21:00

| Sparta Prague (Czech Republic) | 4–1 | (Turkey) Galatasaray |
|---|---|---|
| Preciado 8'; Tuci 74'; Haraslín 80'; Kuchta 90+6' | Report | Bardakcı 16' |

Stadion Letná, Prague
Attendance: 18,205
Referee: Anthony Taylor (England)

Sparta Prague won 6–4 on aggregate.

15 February 2024
18:45

| Shakhtar Donetsk (Ukraine) | 2–2 | (France) Marseille |
|---|---|---|
| Matviyenko 68'; Eguinaldo 90+3' | Report | Aubameyang 64'; Ndiaye 90' |

Volksparkstadion, Hamburg, Germany (Note: Due to the Russian invasion of Ukraine, Ukrainian teams were required to play their home matches at neutral venues until further notice.)
Attendance: 28,790
Referee: Erik Lambrechts (Belgium)
22 February 2024
21:00

| Marseille (France) | 3–1 | (Ukraine) Shakhtar Donetsk |
|---|---|---|
| Aubameyang 23'; Sarr 74'; Kondogbia 81' | Report | Sudakov 12' (pen.) |

Stade Vélodrome, Marseille
Attendance: 63,182
Referee: Tobias Stieler (Germany)

Marseille won 5–3 on aggregate.

== Round of 16 ==
The draw for the round of 16 was held on 23 February 2024, 12:00 CET.

=== Summary ===
The first legs were played on 6 and 7 March, and the second legs were played on 14 March 2024.

| Team 1 | Agg. | Team 2 | 1st leg | 2nd leg |
|---|---|---|---|---|
| Sparta Prague (Czech Republic) | 2–11 | (England) Liverpool | 1–5 | 1–6 |
| Marseille (France) | 5–3 | (Spain) Villarreal | 4–0 | 1–3 |
| Roma (Italy) | 4–1 | (England) Brighton & Hove Albion | 4–0 | 0–1 |
| Benfica (Portugal) | 3–2 | (Scotland) Rangers | 2–2 | 1–0 |
| SC Freiburg (Germany) | 1–5 | (England) West Ham United | 1–0 | 0–5 |
| Sporting CP (Portugal) | 2–3 | (Italy) Atalanta | 1–1 | 1–2 |
| Milan (Italy) | 7–3 | (Czech Republic) Slavia Prague | 4–2 | 3–1 |
| Qarabağ (Azerbaijan) | 4–5 | (Germany) Bayer Leverkusen | 2–2 | 2–3 |

=== Matches ===
7 March 2024
18:45

| Sparta Prague (Czech Republic) | 1–5 | (England) Liverpool |
|---|---|---|
| Bradley 46' (o.g.) | Report | Mac Allister 6' (pen.); Núñez 25', 45+3'; Díaz 53'; Szoboszlai 90+4' |

Stadion Letná, Prague
Attendance: 18,349
Referee: José María Sánchez Martínez (Spain)
14 March 2024
21:00 (20:00 UTC+0)

| Liverpool (England) | 6–1 | (Czech Republic) Sparta Prague |
|---|---|---|
| Núñez 7'; Clark 8'; Salah 10'; Gakpo 14', 55'; Szoboszlai 48' | Report | Birmančević 42' |

Anfield, Liverpool
Attendance: 59,581
Referee: Artur Soares Dias (Portugal)

Liverpool won 11–2 on aggregate.

7 March 2024
21:00

| Marseille (France) | 4–0 | (Spain) Villarreal |
|---|---|---|
| Veretout 23'; Mosquera 28' (o.g.); Aubameyang 42' (pen.), 59' | Report |

Stade Vélodrome, Marseille
Attendance: 53,396
Referee: Serdar Gözübüyük (Netherlands)
14 March 2024
18:45

| Villarreal (Spain) | 3–1 | (France) Marseille |
|---|---|---|
| Capoue 32'; Sørloth 54'; Mosquera 86' | Report | Clauss 90+4' |

Estadio de la Cerámica, Villarreal
Attendance: 15,378
Referee: István Kovács (Romania)

Marseille won 5–3 on aggregate.

7 March 2024
18:45

| Roma (Italy) | 4–0 | (England) Brighton & Hove Albion |
|---|---|---|
| Dybala 13'; Lukaku 43'; Mancini 64'; Cristante 68' | Report |

Stadio Olimpico, Rome
Attendance: 64,877
Referee: François Letexier (France)
14 March 2024
21:00 (20:00 UTC+0)

| Brighton & Hove Albion (England) | 1–0 | (Italy) Roma |
|---|---|---|
| Welbeck 37' | Report |

Falmer Stadium, Brighton and Hove
Attendance: 30,380
Referee: Felix Zwayer (Germany)

Roma won 4–1 on aggregate.

7 March 2024
21:00 (20:00 UTC+0)

| Benfica (Portugal) | 2–2 | (Scotland) Rangers |
|---|---|---|
| Di María 45+2' (pen.); Goldson 67' (o.g.) | Report | Lawrence 7'; Sterling 45+5' |

Estádio da Luz, Lisbon
Attendance: 48,579
Referee: Tobias Stieler (Germany)
14 March 2024
18:45 (17:45 UTC+0)

| Rangers (Scotland) | 0–1 | (Portugal) Benfica |
|---|---|---|
| | Report | R. Silva 66' |

Ibrox Stadium, Glasgow
Attendance: 49,943
Referee: Ivan Kružliak (Slovakia)

Benfica won 3–2 on aggregate.

7 March 2024
21:00

| SC Freiburg (Germany) | 1–0 | (England) West Ham United |
|---|---|---|
| Gregoritsch 81' | Report |

Europa-Park Stadion, Freiburg im Breisgau
Attendance: 34,700
Referee: Alejandro Hernández Hernández (Spain)
14 March 2024
18:45 (17:45 UTC+0)

| West Ham United (England) | 5–0 | (Germany) SC Freiburg |
|---|---|---|
| Paquetá 9'; Bowen 32'; Cresswell 52'; Kudus 77', 85' | Report |

London Stadium, London
Attendance: 51,014
Referee: Marco Guida (Italy)

West Ham United won 5–1 on aggregate.

6 March 2024
18:45 (17:45 UTC+0)

| Sporting CP (Portugal) | 1–1 | (Italy) Atalanta |
|---|---|---|
| Paulinho 17' | Report | Scamacca 39' |

Estádio José Alvalade, Lisbon
Attendance: 28,528
Referee: Daniel Siebert (Germany)
14 March 2024
21:00

| Atalanta (Italy) | 2–1 | (Portugal) Sporting CP |
|---|---|---|
| Lookman 46'; Scamacca 59' | Report | Gonçalves 33' |

Stadio Atleti Azzurri d'Italia, Bergamo
Attendance: 14,649
Referee: Sandro Schärer (Switzerland)

Atalanta won 3–2 on aggregate.

7 March 2024
21:00

| Milan (Italy) | 4–2 | (Czech Republic) Slavia Prague |
|---|---|---|
| Giroud 34'; Reijnders 44'; Loftus-Cheek 45+1'; Pulisic 85' | Report | Douděra 36'; Schranz 65' |

San Siro, Milan
Attendance: 59,325
Referee: Halil Umut Meler (Turkey)
14 March 2024
18:45

| Slavia Prague (Czech Republic) | 1–3 | (Italy) Milan |
|---|---|---|
| Jurásek 84' | Report | Pulisic 33'; Loftus-Cheek 36'; Leão 45+6' |

Fortuna Arena, Prague
Attendance: 19,334
Referee: Glenn Nyberg (Sweden)

Milan won 7–3 on aggregate.

7 March 2024
18:45 (21:45 UTC+4)

| Qarabağ (Azerbaijan) | 2–2 | (Germany) Bayer Leverkusen |
|---|---|---|
| Benzia 26'; Juninho 45+2' | Report | Wirtz 70'; Schick 90+2' |

Tofiq Bahramov Republican Stadium, Baku
Attendance: 30,423
Referee: Benoît Bastien (France)
14 March 2024
21:00

| Bayer Leverkusen (Germany) | 3–2 | (Azerbaijan) Qarabağ |
|---|---|---|
| Frimpong 72'; Schick 90+3', 90+8' | Report | Zoubir 58'; Juninho 67' |

BayArena, Leverkusen
Attendance: 30,210
Referee: Anthony Taylor (England)

Bayer Leverkusen won 5–4 on aggregate.

== Quarter-finals ==
The draw for the quarter-finals was held on 15 March 2024, 13:00 CET.

=== Summary ===
The first legs were played on 11 April, and the second legs were played on 18 April 2024.

| Team 1 | Agg. | Team 2 | 1st leg | 2nd leg |
|---|---|---|---|---|
| Milan (Italy) | 1–3 | (Italy) Roma | 0–1 | 1–2 |
| Liverpool (England) | 1–3 | (Italy) Atalanta | 0–3 | 1–0 |
| Bayer Leverkusen (Germany) | 3–1 | (England) West Ham United | 2–0 | 1–1 |
| Benfica (Portugal) | 2–2 (2–4 p) | (France) Marseille | 2–1 | 0–1 (a.e.t.) |

=== Matches ===
11 April 2024
21:00

| Milan (Italy) | 0–1 | (Italy) Roma |
|---|---|---|
| | Report | Mancini 17' |

San Siro, Milan
Attendance: 75,023
Referee: Clément Turpin (France)
18 April 2024
21:00

| Roma (Italy) | 2–1 | (Italy) Milan |
|---|---|---|
| Mancini 12'; Dybala 22' | Report | Gabbia 85' |

Stadio Olimpico, Rome
Attendance: 66,025
Referee: Szymon Marciniak (Poland)

Roma won 3–1 on aggregate.

11 April 2024
21:00 (20:00 UTC+1)

| Liverpool (England) | 0–3 | (Italy) Atalanta |
|---|---|---|
| | Report | Scamacca 38', 60'; Pašalić 83' |

Anfield, Liverpool
Attendance: 59,004
Referee: Halil Umut Meler (Turkey)
18 April 2024
21:00

| Atalanta (Italy) | 0–1 | (England) Liverpool |
|---|---|---|
| | Report | Salah 7' (pen.) |

Stadio Atleti Azzurri d'Italia, Bergamo
Attendance: 14,994
Referee: François Letexier (France)

Atalanta won 3–1 on aggregate.

11 April 2024
21:00

| Bayer Leverkusen (Germany) | 2–0 | (England) West Ham United |
|---|---|---|
| Hofmann 83'; Boniface 90+1' | Report |

BayArena, Leverkusen
Attendance: 30,210
Referee: Artur Soares Dias (Portugal)
18 April 2024
21:00 (20:00 UTC+1)

| West Ham United (England) | 1–1 | (Germany) Bayer Leverkusen |
|---|---|---|
| Antonio 13' | Report | Frimpong 89' |

London Stadium, London
Attendance: 62,473
Referee: José María Sánchez Martínez (Spain)

Bayer Leverkusen won 3–1 on aggregate.

11 April 2024
21:00 (20:00 UTC+1)

| Benfica (Portugal) | 2–1 | (France) Marseille |
|---|---|---|
| R. Silva 16'; Di María 52' | Report | Aubameyang 67' |

Estádio da Luz, Lisbon
Attendance: 53,845
Referee: Michael Oliver (England)
18 April 2024
21:00

| Marseille (France) | 1–0 (a.e.t.) | (Portugal) Benfica |
|---|---|---|
| Moumbagna 79' | Report |
Penalties
| Correa (penalty scored); Kondogbia (penalty scored); Balerdi (penalty scored); Luis Henrique (penalty scored) | 4–2 | (penalty missed) Di María; (penalty scored) Kökçü; (penalty scored) Otamendi; (penalty missed) A. Silva |

Stade Vélodrome, Marseille
Attendance: 59,645
Referee: Felix Zwayer (Germany)

2–2 on aggregate; Marseille won 4–2 on penalties.

== Semi-finals ==
The draw for the semi-finals was held on 15 March 2024, 13:00 CET, after the quarter-final draw.

=== Summary ===
The first legs were played on 2 May, and the second legs were played on 9 May 2024.

| Team 1 | Agg. | Team 2 | 1st leg | 2nd leg |
|---|---|---|---|---|
| Marseille (France) | 1–4 | (Italy) Atalanta | 1–1 | 0–3 |
| Roma (Italy) | 2–4 | (Germany) Bayer Leverkusen | 0–2 | 2–2 |

=== Matches ===
2 May 2024
21:00

| Marseille (France) | 1–1 | (Italy) Atalanta |
|---|---|---|
| Mbemba 20' | Report | Scamacca 11' |

Stade Vélodrome, Marseille
Attendance: 64,475
Referee: Daniel Siebert (Germany)
9 May 2024
21:00

| Atalanta (Italy) | 3–0 | (France) Marseille |
|---|---|---|
| Lookman 30'; Ruggeri 52'; Touré 90+5' | Report |

Stadio Atleti Azzurri d'Italia, Bergamo
Attendance: 14,994
Referee: Jesús Gil Manzano (Spain)

Atalanta won 4–1 on aggregate.

2 May 2024
21:00

| Roma (Italy) | 0–2 | (Germany) Bayer Leverkusen |
|---|---|---|
| | Report | Wirtz 28'; Andrich 73' |

Stadio Olimpico, Rome
Attendance: 64,073
Referee: François Letexier (France)
9 May 2024
21:00

| Bayer Leverkusen (Germany) | 2–2 | (Italy) Roma |
|---|---|---|
| Mancini 82' (o.g.); Stanišić 90+7' | Report | Paredes 43' (pen.), 66' (pen.) |

BayArena, Leverkusen
Attendance: 30,210
Referee: Danny Makkelie (Netherlands)

Bayer Leverkusen won 4–2 on aggregate.

== Final ==
The final was played on 22 May 2024 at the Aviva Stadium in Dublin. A draw was held on 15 March 2024, after the quarter-final and semi-final draw, to determine the "home" team for administrative purposes.

22 May 2024
21:00 (20:00 UTC+1)

| Atalanta (Italy) | 3–0 | (Germany) Bayer Leverkusen |
|---|---|---|
| Lookman 12', 26', 75' | Report |

Aviva Stadium, Dublin
Attendance: 47,135
Referee: István Kovács (Romania)
