= 2023–24 UEFA Champions League knockout phase =

Europe premier club football tournament

The 2023–24 UEFA Champions League knockout phase began on 13 February with the round of 16 and ended on 1 June 2024 with the final at Wembley Stadium in London, England, to decide the champions of the 2023–24 UEFA Champions League. A total of 16 teams competed in the knockout phase.

Times are CET/CEST, (Note: CET (UTC+1) for dates up to 13 March 2024 (round of 16), and CEST (UTC+2) for dates thereafter (quarter-finals, semi-finals and final).) as listed by UEFA (local times, if different, are in parentheses).

== Qualified teams ==
The knockout phase involved the 16 teams which qualified as winners and runners-up of each of the eight groups in the group stage.

Group	Winners (seeded in round of 16 draw)	Runners-up (unseeded in round of 16 draw)
A	(Germany) Bayern Munich	(Denmark) Copenhagen
B	(England) Arsenal	(Netherlands) PSV Eindhoven
C	(Spain) Real Madrid	(Italy) Napoli
D	(Spain) Real Sociedad	(Italy) Inter Milan
E	(Spain) Atlético Madrid	(Italy) Lazio
F	(Germany) Borussia Dortmund	(France) Paris Saint-Germain
G	(England) Manchester City	(Germany) RB Leipzig
H	(Spain) Barcelona	(Portugal) Porto

== Format ==
Each tie in the knockout phase, apart from the final, was played over two legs, with each team playing one leg at home. The team that scored more goals on aggregate over the two legs advanced to the next round. If the aggregate score was level, then 30 minutes of extra time were played (the away goals rule was not applied). If the score was still level at the end of extra time, the winners were decided by a penalty shoot-out. In the final, which was played as a single match, if the score was level at the end of normal time, extra time was played, followed by a penalty shoot-out if the score was still level. The mechanism of the draws for each round was as follows:

- In the draw for the round of 16, the eight group winners were seeded, and the eight group runners-up were unseeded. The seeded teams were drawn against the unseeded teams, with the seeded teams hosting the second leg. Teams from the same group or the same association could not be drawn against each other.
- In the draws for the quarter-finals and semi-finals, there were no seedings, and teams from the same group or the same association could be drawn against each other. As the draws for the quarter-finals and semi-finals were held together before the quarter-finals were played, the identity of the quarter-final winners was not known at the time of the semi-final draw. A draw was also held to determine which semi-final winner was designated as the "home" team for the final (for administrative purposes as it was played at a neutral venue).

For the quarter-finals and semi-finals, teams from the same city, were not scheduled to play at home on the same day or consecutive days, due to logistics and crowd control. To avoid such scheduling conflict, if the two teams were drawn to play at home for the same leg, the order of legs of the tie involving the team which was not titleholders of Champions League or Europa League (or lower-tier, if both were continental titleholders), or the team with the lower domestic ranking in the qualifying season (if neither team were continental title holder) was reversed from the original draw.

== Schedule ==
The schedule was as follows (all draws were held at the UEFA headquarters in Nyon, Switzerland).

Round	Draw date	First leg	Second leg
Round of 16	18 December 2023, 12:00	13–14 & 20–21 February 2024	5–6 & 12–13 March 2024
Quarter-finals	15 March 2024, 12:00	9–10 April 2024	16–17 April 2024
Semi-finals	15 March 2024, 12:00	30 April – 1 May 2024	7–8 May 2024
Final	15 March 2024, 12:00	1 June 2024 at Wembley Stadium, London	

== Bracket ==
Round of 16
(Italy) Inter Milan	1	1	2 (2)
(Spain) Atlético Madrid (p)	0	2	2 (3)
(Netherlands) PSV Eindhoven	1	0	1
(Germany) Borussia Dortmund	1	2	3
(France) Paris Saint-Germain	2	2	4
(Spain) Real Sociedad	0	1	1
(Italy) Napoli	1	1	2
(Spain) Barcelona	1	3	4
(Portugal) Porto	1	0	1 (2)
(England) Arsenal (p)	0	1	1 (4)
(Italy) Lazio	1	0	1
(Germany) Bayern Munich	0	3	3
(Germany) RB Leipzig	0	1	1
(Spain) Real Madrid	1	1	2
(Denmark) Copenhagen	1	1	2
(England) Manchester City	3	3	6

Quarter-finals
(Spain) Atlético Madrid	2	2	4
(Germany) Borussia Dortmund	1	4	5
(France) Paris Saint-Germain	2	4	6
(Spain) Barcelona	3	1	4
(England) Arsenal	2	0	2
(Germany) Bayern Munich	2	1	3
(Spain) Real Madrid (p)	3	1	4 (4)
(England) Manchester City	3	1	4 (3)

Semi-finals
(Germany) Borussia Dortmund	1	1	2
(France) Paris Saint-Germain	0	0	0
(Germany) Bayern Munich	2	1	3
(Spain) Real Madrid	2	2	4

Final
1 June – London
(Germany) Borussia Dortmund	0
(Spain) Real Madrid	2

== Round of 16 ==
The draw for the round of 16 was held on 18 December 2023, 12:00 CET.

=== Summary ===
The first legs were played on 13, 14, 20 and 21 February, and the second legs were played on 5, 6, 12 and 13 March 2024.

Team 1	Agg.	Team 2	1st leg	2nd leg
Porto (Portugal)	1–1 (2–4 p)	(England) Arsenal	1–0	0–1 (a.e.t.)
Napoli (Italy)	2–4	(Spain) Barcelona	1–1	1–3
Paris Saint-Germain (France)	4–1	(Spain) Real Sociedad	2–0	2–1
Inter Milan (Italy)	2–2 (2–3 p)	(Spain) Atlético Madrid	1–0	1–2 (a.e.t.)
PSV Eindhoven (Netherlands)	1–3	(Germany) Borussia Dortmund	1–1	0–2
Lazio (Italy)	1–3	(Germany) Bayern Munich	1–0	0–3
Copenhagen (Denmark)	2–6	(England) Manchester City	1–3	1–3
RB Leipzig (Germany)	1–2	(Spain) Real Madrid	0–1	1–1

=== Matches ===
21 February 2024
21:00 (20:00 UTC+0)

Porto (Portugal)	1–0	(England) Arsenal
Galeno 90+4'	Report

Estádio do Dragão, Porto
Attendance: 49,111
Referee: Serdar Gözübüyük (Netherlands)
12 March 2024
21:00 (20:00 UTC+0)

Arsenal (England)	1–0 (a.e.t.)	(Portugal) Porto
Trossard 41'	Report
Penalties
Ødegaard (penalty scored); Havertz (penalty scored); Saka (penalty scored); Rice (penalty scored)	4–2	(penalty scored) Pepê; (penalty missed) Wendell; (penalty scored) Grujić; (penalty missed) Galeno

Emirates Stadium, London
Attendance: 60,257
Referee: Clément Turpin (France)

1–1 on aggregate; Arsenal won 4–2 on penalties.

21 February 2024
21:00

Napoli (Italy)	1–1	(Spain) Barcelona
Osimhen 75'	Report	Lewandowski 60'

Stadio Diego Armando Maradona, Naples
Attendance: 49,529
Referee: Felix Zwayer (Germany)
12 March 2024
21:00

Barcelona (Spain)	3–1	(Italy) Napoli
López 15'; Cancelo 17'; Lewandowski 83'	Report	Rrahmani 30'

Estadi Olímpic Lluís Companys, Barcelona (Note: Barcelona played their home matches at the Estadi Olímpic Lluís Companys, in Barcelona, instead of their regular stadium, Camp Nou, in Barcelona, which was being renovated.)
Attendance: 50,301
Referee: Danny Makkelie (Netherlands)

Barcelona won 4–2 on aggregate.

14 February 2024
21:00

Paris Saint-Germain (France)	2–0	(Spain) Real Sociedad
K. Mbappé 58'; Barcola 70'	Report

Parc des Princes, Paris
Attendance: 46,435
Referee: Marco Guida (Italy)
5 March 2024
21:00

Real Sociedad (Spain)	1–2	(France) Paris Saint-Germain
Merino 89'	Report	Mbappé 15', 56'

Anoeta, San Sebastián
Attendance: 39,336
Referee: Michael Oliver (England)

Paris Saint-Germain won 4–1 on aggregate.

20 February 2024
21:00

Inter Milan (Italy)	1–0	(Spain) Atlético Madrid
Arnautović 79'	Report

San Siro, Milan
Attendance: 73,709
Referee: István Kovács (Romania)
13 March 2024
21:00

Atlético Madrid (Spain)	2–1 (a.e.t.)	(Italy) Inter Milan
Griezmann 35'; Depay 87'	Report	Dimarco 33'
Penalties
Depay (penalty scored); Saúl (penalty missed); Riquelme (penalty scored); Correa (penalty scored)	3–2	(penalty scored) Çalhanoğlu; (penalty missed) Sánchez; (penalty missed) Klaassen; (penalty scored) Acerbi; (penalty missed) Martínez

Metropolitano Stadium, Madrid
Attendance: 69,196
Referee: Szymon Marciniak (Poland)

2–2 on aggregate; Atlético Madrid won 3–2 on penalties.

20 February 2024
21:00

PSV Eindhoven (Netherlands)	1–1	(Germany) Borussia Dortmund
De Jong 56' (pen.)	Report	Malen 24'

Philips Stadion, Eindhoven
Attendance: 34,950
Referee: Srđan Jovanović (Serbia)
13 March 2024
21:00

Borussia Dortmund (Germany)	2–0	(Netherlands) PSV Eindhoven
Sancho 3'; Reus 90+5'	Report

Westfalenstadion, Dortmund
Attendance: 81,365
Referee: Daniele Orsato (Italy)

Borussia Dortmund won 3–1 on aggregate.

14 February 2024
21:00

Lazio (Italy)	1–0	(Germany) Bayern Munich
Immobile 69' (pen.)	Report

Stadio Olimpico, Rome
Attendance: 57,470
Referee: François Letexier (France)
5 March 2024
21:00

Bayern Munich (Germany)	3–0	(Italy) Lazio
Kane 38', 66'; Müller 45+2'	Report

Allianz Arena, Munich
Attendance: 75,000
Referee: Slavko Vinčić (Slovenia)

Bayern Munich won 3–1 on aggregate.

13 February 2024
21:00

Copenhagen (Denmark)	1–3	(England) Manchester City
Mattsson 34'	Report	De Bruyne 10'; Silva 45+1'; Foden 90+2'

Parken Stadium, Copenhagen
Attendance: 35,853
Referee: José María Sánchez Martínez (Spain)
6 March 2024
21:00 (20:00 UTC+0)

Manchester City (England)	3–1	(Denmark) Copenhagen
Akanji 5'; Alvarez 9'; Haaland 45+3'	Report	Elyounoussi 29'

City of Manchester Stadium, Manchester
Attendance: 51,531
Referee: Espen Eskås (Norway)

Manchester City won 6–2 on aggregate.

13 February 2024
21:00

RB Leipzig (Germany)	0–1	(Spain) Real Madrid
	Report	Brahim 48'

Red Bull Arena, Leipzig
Attendance: 45,028
Referee: Irfan Peljto (Bosnia and Herzegovina)
6 March 2024
21:00

Real Madrid (Spain)	1–1	(Germany) RB Leipzig
Vinícius 65'	Report	Orbán 68'

Santiago Bernabéu, Madrid
Attendance: 76,126
Referee: Davide Massa (Italy)

Real Madrid won 2–1 on aggregate.

== Quarter-finals ==
The draw for the quarter-finals was held on 15 March 2024, 12:00 CET.

=== Summary ===
The first legs were played on 9 and 10 April, and the second legs were played on 16 and 17 April 2024.

Team 1	Agg.	Team 2	1st leg	2nd leg
Arsenal (England)	2–3	(Germany) Bayern Munich	2–2	0–1
Atlético Madrid (Spain)	4–5	(Germany) Borussia Dortmund	2–1	2–4
Real Madrid (Spain)	4–4 (4–3 p)	(England) Manchester City	3–3	1–1 (a.e.t.)
Paris Saint-Germain (France)	6–4	(Spain) Barcelona	2–3	4–1

=== Matches ===
9 April 2024
21:00 (20:00 UTC+1)

Arsenal (England)	2–2	(Germany) Bayern Munich
Saka 12'; Trossard 76'	Report	Gnabry 18'; Kane 32' (pen.)

Emirates Stadium, London
Attendance: 60,221
Referee: Glenn Nyberg (Sweden)
17 April 2024
21:00

Bayern Munich (Germany)	1–0	(England) Arsenal
Kimmich 63'	Report

Allianz Arena, Munich
Attendance: 75,000
Referee: Danny Makkelie (Netherlands)

Bayern Munich won 3–2 on aggregate.

10 April 2024
21:00

Atlético Madrid (Spain)	2–1	(Germany) Borussia Dortmund
De Paul 4'; Lino 32'	Report	Haller 81'

Metropolitano Stadium, Madrid
Attendance: 68,641
Referee: Marco Guida (Italy)
16 April 2024
21:00

Borussia Dortmund (Germany)	4–2	(Spain) Atlético Madrid
Brandt 34'; Maatsen 39'; Füllkrug 71'; Sabitzer 74'	Report	Hummels 49' (o.g.); Correa 64'

Westfalenstadion, Dortmund
Attendance: 81,365
Referee: Slavko Vinčić (Slovenia)

Borussia Dortmund won 5–4 on aggregate.

9 April 2024
21:00

Real Madrid (Spain)	3–3	(England) Manchester City
Dias 12' (o.g.); Rodrygo 14'; Valverde 79'	Report	Silva 2'; Foden 66'; Gvardiol 71'

Santiago Bernabéu, Madrid
Attendance: 76,680
Referee: François Letexier (France)
17 April 2024
21:00 (20:00 UTC+1)

Manchester City (England)	1–1 (a.e.t.)	(Spain) Real Madrid
De Bruyne 76'	Report	Rodrygo 12'
Penalties
Alvarez (penalty scored); Silva (penalty missed); Kovačić (penalty missed); Foden (penalty scored); Ederson (penalty scored)	3–4	(penalty missed) Modrić; (penalty scored) Bellingham; (penalty scored) Vázquez; (penalty scored) Nacho; (penalty scored) Rüdiger

City of Manchester Stadium, Manchester
Attendance: 52,306
Referee: Daniele Orsato (Italy)

4–4 on aggregate; Real Madrid won 4–3 on penalties.

10 April 2024
21:00

Paris Saint-Germain (France)	2–3	(Spain) Barcelona
Dembélé 48'; Vitinha 51'	Report	Raphinha 37', 62'; Christensen 77'

Parc des Princes, Paris
Attendance: 47,470
Referee: Anthony Taylor (England)
16 April 2024
21:00

Barcelona (Spain)	1–4	(France) Paris Saint-Germain
Raphinha 12'	Report	Dembélé 40'; Vitinha 54'; Mbappé 61' (pen.), 89'

Estadi Olímpic Lluís Companys, Barcelona
Attendance: 50,309
Referee: István Kovács (Romania)

Paris Saint-Germain won 6–4 on aggregate.

== Semi-finals ==
The draw for the semi-finals was held on 15 March 2024, 12:00 CET, after the quarter-final draw.

=== Summary ===
The first legs were played on 30 April and 1 May, and the second legs were played on 7 and 8 May 2024.

Team 1	Agg.	Team 2	1st leg	2nd leg
Borussia Dortmund (Germany)	2–0	(France) Paris Saint-Germain	1–0	1–0
Bayern Munich (Germany)	3–4	(Spain) Real Madrid	2–2	1–2

=== Matches ===
1 May 2024
21:00

Borussia Dortmund (Germany)	1–0	(France) Paris Saint-Germain
Füllkrug 36'	Report

Westfalenstadion, Dortmund
Attendance: 81,365
Referee: Anthony Taylor (England)
7 May 2024
21:00

Paris Saint-Germain (France)	0–1	(Germany) Borussia Dortmund
	Report	Hummels 50'

Parc des Princes, Paris
Attendance: 46,435
Referee: Daniele Orsato (Italy)

Borussia Dortmund won 2–0 on aggregate.

30 April 2024
21:00

Bayern Munich (Germany)	2–2	(Spain) Real Madrid
Sané 53'; Kane 57' (pen.)	Report	Vinícius 24', 83' (pen.)

Allianz Arena, Munich
Attendance: 75,000
Referee: Clément Turpin (France)
8 May 2024
21:00

Real Madrid (Spain)	2–1	(Germany) Bayern Munich
Joselu 88', 90+1'	Report	Davies 68'

Santiago Bernabéu, Madrid
Attendance: 76,579
Referee: Szymon Marciniak (Poland)

Real Madrid won 4–3 on aggregate.

== Final ==
The final was played on 1 June 2024 at Wembley Stadium in London. A draw was held on 15 March 2024, after the quarter-final and semi-final draws, to determine the "home" team for administrative purposes.

1 June 2024
21:00 (20:00 UTC+1)

Borussia Dortmund (Germany)	0–2	(Spain) Real Madrid
	Report	Carvajal 74'; Vinícius 83'

Wembley Stadium, London
Attendance: 86,212
Referee: Slavko Vinčić (Slovenia)
