= 2023–24 UEFA Champions League group stage =

International football club competition in Europe

The 2023–24 UEFA Champions League group stage began on 19 September 2023 and ended on 13 December 2023. A total of 32 teams competed in the group stage to decide the 16 places in the knockout phase of the 2023–24 UEFA Champions League.

Union Berlin and Antwerp made their debut appearance in the group stage. This was the Belgian club's first appearance in the European Cup since their first round exit in the 1957–58 season, and the first ever for the German side. A total of 15 national associations were represented in the group stage.

This was the final season with the group stage format, which was replaced by the league stage format starting from the next season.

== Draw ==
The draw for the group stage was held on 31 August 2023, 18:00 CEST, in Monaco. The 32 teams were drawn into eight groups of four. For the draw, the teams were seeded into four pots, each of eight teams, based on the following principles:

- Pot 1 contained the Europa League title holders, and the champions of the top seven associations based on their 2022–23 UEFA country coefficients.
- Pot 2, 3 and 4 contained the remaining teams, seeded based on their 2022–23 UEFA club coefficients.

Teams from the same association could not be drawn into the same group. Prior to the draw, UEFA formed pairings of teams from the same association (one pairing for associations with two or three teams, two pairings for associations with four or five teams) based on television audiences, where one team would be drawn into Groups A–D and another team would be drawn into Groups E–H, so that the two teams would play on different days. The following pairings were announced by UEFA after the group stage teams were confirmed:

1. (England) Manchester City and Manchester United
2. (Spain) Sevilla and Atlético Madrid
3. (Spain) Barcelona and Real Madrid
4. (Italy) Napoli and Lazio
5. (Germany) Bayern Munich and Borussia Dortmund
6. (France) Paris Saint-Germain and Lens
7. (Portugal) Benfica and Porto
8. (Netherlands) Feyenoord and PSV Eindhoven
9. (Italy) Inter Milan and Milan
10. (Germany) RB Leipzig and Union Berlin
11. (England) Arsenal and Newcastle United

On each matchday, one set of four groups played their matches on Tuesday, while the other set of four groups played their matches on Wednesday, with the two sets of groups alternating between each matchday. The fixtures were decided after the draw, using a computer draw not shown to public. Each team did not play more than two home matches or two away matches in a row, and played one home match and one away match on the first and last matchdays (Regulations Article 16.02).

== Teams ==
Below were the participating teams (with their 2023 UEFA club coefficients), grouped by their seeding pot. They included:

- 26 teams which entered in this stage
- 6 winners of the play-off round (4 from Champions Path, 2 from League Path)

Key to colours
Group winners and runners-up advanced to round of 16
Third-placed teams entered Europa League knockout round play-offs

Pot 1 (by association rank)
Assoc.	Team	Notes	Coeff.
1	(England) Manchester City		145.000
—	(Spain) Sevilla		91.000
2	(Spain) Barcelona		98.000
3	(Italy) Napoli		81.000
4	(Germany) Bayern Munich		136.000
5	(France) Paris Saint-Germain		112.000
6	(Portugal) Benfica		82.000
7	(Netherlands) Feyenoord		51.000

Pot 2
Team	Coeff.
(Spain) Real Madrid	121.000
(England) Manchester United	104.000
(Italy) Inter Milan	96.000
(Germany) Borussia Dortmund	86.000
(Spain) Atlético Madrid	85.000
(Germany) RB Leipzig	84.000
(Portugal) Porto	81.000
(England) Arsenal	76.000

Pot 3
Team	Notes	Coeff.
(Ukraine) Shakhtar Donetsk		63.000
(Austria) Red Bull Salzburg		59.000
(Italy) Milan		50.000
(Portugal) Braga		44.000
(Netherlands) PSV Eindhoven		43.000
(Italy) Lazio		42.000
(Serbia) Red Star Belgrade		42.000
(Denmark) Copenhagen		40.500

Pot 4
Team	Notes	Coeff.
(Switzerland) Young Boys		34.500
(Spain) Real Sociedad		33.000
(Turkey) Galatasaray		31.500
(Scotland) Celtic		31.000
(England) Newcastle United		21.914
(Germany) Union Berlin		17.000
(Belgium) Antwerp		17.000
(France) Lens		12.232

Notes

1. ^{TH} Champions League title holders, automatically placed into Pot 1 as top seed.
2. ^{EL} Europa League title holders, automatically placed into Pot 1 as second top seed.
3. ^{CP} Winners of Champions Path.
4. ^{LP} Winners of League Path.

== Format ==
In each group, teams played against each other home-and-away in a round-robin format. The top two teams of each group advanced to the round of 16. The third-placed teams were transferred to the Europa League knockout round play-offs, while the fourth-placed teams were eliminated from European competitions for the season.

=== Tiebreakers ===
Teams were ranked according to points (3 points for a win, 1 point for a draw, 0 points for a loss). If two or more teams were tied on points, the following tiebreaking criteria were applied, in the order given, to determine the rankings (see Article 17 Equality of points – group stage, Regulations of the UEFA Champions League):

1. Points in head-to-head matches among the tied teams;
2. Goal difference in head-to-head matches among the tied teams;
3. Goals scored in head-to-head matches among the tied teams;
4. If more than two teams were tied, and after applying all head-to-head criteria above, a subset of teams were still tied, all head-to-head criteria above were reapplied exclusively to this subset of teams;
5. Goal difference in all group matches;
6. Goals scored in all group matches;
7. Away goals scored in all group matches;
8. Wins in all group matches;
9. Away wins in all group matches;
10. Disciplinary points (direct red card = 3 points; double yellow card = 3 points; single yellow card = 1 point);
11. UEFA club coefficient.

== Groups ==
The fixtures were announced on 2 September 2023, two days after the draw. The matches were played on 19–20 September, 3–4 October, 24–25 October, 7–8 November, 28–29 November and 12–13 December 2023. The scheduled kick-off times were 18:45 (two matches on each day) and 21:00 (remaining six matches) CET or CEST.

Times are CET or CEST, (Note: CEST (UTC+2) for dates up to 25 October 2023 (matchdays 1–3), and CET (UTC+1) for dates thereafter (matchdays 4–6).) as listed by UEFA (local times, if different, are in parentheses).

=== Group A ===
Pos	Team	Pld	W	D	L	GF	GA	GD	Pts	Qualification	BAY	CPH	GAL	MUN
1	(Germany) Bayern Munich	6	5	1	0	12	6	+6	16	Advance to knockout phase	—	0–0	2–1	4–3
2	(Denmark) Copenhagen	6	2	2	2	8	8	0	8	Advance to knockout phase	1–2	—	1–0	4–3
3	(Turkey) Galatasaray	6	1	2	3	10	13	−3	5	Transfer to Europa League	1–3	2–2	—	3–3
4	(England) Manchester United	6	1	1	4	12	15	−3	4		0–1	1–0	2–3	—

Source: UEFA
Rules for classification: Group stage tiebreakers
20 September 2023
18:45 (19:45 UTC+3)

Galatasaray (Turkey)	2–2	(Denmark) Copenhagen
Boey 86'; Tetê 88'	Report	Elyounoussi 35'; Gonçalves 58'

Rams Park, Istanbul
Attendance: 46,911
Referee: Georgi Kabakov (Bulgaria)
20 September 2023
21:00

Bayern Munich (Germany)	4–3	(England) Manchester United
Sané 28'; Gnabry 32'; Kane 53' (pen.); Tel 90+2'	Report	Højlund 49'; Casemiro 88', 90+5'

Allianz Arena, Munich
Attendance: 75,000
Referee: Glenn Nyberg (Sweden)

3 October 2023
21:00 (20:00 UTC+1)

Manchester United (England)	2–3	(Turkey) Galatasaray
Højlund 17', 67'	Report	Zaha 23'; Aktürkoğlu 71'; Icardi 81'

Old Trafford, Manchester
Attendance: 73,204
Referee: Ivan Kružliak (Slovakia)
3 October 2023
21:00

Copenhagen (Denmark)	1–2	(Germany) Bayern Munich
Lerager 56'	Report	Musiala 67'; Tel 83'

Parken Stadium, Copenhagen
Attendance: 35,690
Referee: Orel Grinfeld (Israel)

24 October 2023
18:45 (19:45 UTC+3)

Galatasaray (Turkey)	1–3	(Germany) Bayern Munich
Icardi 30' (pen.)	Report	Coman 8'; Kane 73'; Musiala 79'

Rams Park, Istanbul
Attendance: 51,776
Referee: Davide Massa (Italy)
24 October 2023
21:00 (20:00 UTC+1)

Manchester United (England)	1–0	(Denmark) Copenhagen
Maguire 72'	Report

Old Trafford, Manchester
Attendance: 73,249
Referee: Marco Guida (Italy)

8 November 2023
21:00

Bayern Munich (Germany)	2–1	(Turkey) Galatasaray
Kane 80', 86'	Report	Bakambu 90+3'

Allianz Arena, Munich
Attendance: 75,000
Referee: António Nobre (Portugal)
8 November 2023
21:00

Copenhagen (Denmark)	4–3	(England) Manchester United
Elyounoussi 45'; Gonçalves 45+9' (pen.); Lerager 83'; Bardghji 87'	Report	Højlund 3', 28'; Fernandes 69' (pen.)

Parken Stadium, Copenhagen
Attendance: 36,099
Referee: Donatas Rumšas (Lithuania)

29 November 2023
18:45 (20:45 UTC+3)

Galatasaray (Turkey)	3–3	(England) Manchester United
Ziyech 29', 62'; Aktürkoğlu 71'	Report	Garnacho 11'; Fernandes 18'; McTominay 55'

Rams Park, Istanbul
Attendance: 51,733
Referee: José María Sánchez Martínez (Spain)
29 November 2023
21:00

Bayern Munich (Germany)	0–0	(Denmark) Copenhagen
	Report

Allianz Arena, Munich
Attendance: 75,000
Referee: Stéphanie Frappart (France)

12 December 2023
21:00 (20:00 UTC+0)

Manchester United (England)	0–1	(Germany) Bayern Munich
	Report	Coman 70'

Old Trafford, Manchester
Attendance: 73,073
Referee: Espen Eskås (Norway)
12 December 2023
21:00

Copenhagen (Denmark)	1–0	(Turkey) Galatasaray
Lerager 58'	Report

Parken Stadium, Copenhagen
Attendance: 34,726
Referee: Daniele Orsato (Italy)

=== Group B ===
Pos	Team	Pld	W	D	L	GF	GA	GD	Pts	Qualification	ARS	PSV	LEN	SEV
1	(England) Arsenal	6	4	1	1	16	4	+12	13	Advance to knockout phase	—	4–0	6–0	2–0
2	(Netherlands) PSV Eindhoven	6	2	3	1	8	10	−2	9	Advance to knockout phase	1–1	—	1–0	2–2
3	(France) Lens	6	2	2	2	6	11	−5	8	Transfer to Europa League	2–1	1–1	—	2–1
4	(Spain) Sevilla	6	0	2	4	7	12	−5	2		1–2	2–3	1–1	—

Source: UEFA
Rules for classification: Group stage tiebreakers
20 September 2023
21:00

Sevilla (Spain)	1–1	(France) Lens
Ocampos 9'	Report	Fulgini 24'

Ramón Sánchez Pizjuán, Seville
Attendance: 33,544
Referee: Tobias Stieler (Germany)
20 September 2023
21:00 (20:00 UTC+1)

Arsenal (England)	4–0	(Netherlands) PSV Eindhoven
Saka 8'; Trossard 20'; Gabriel Jesus 38'; Ødegaard 70'	Report

Emirates Stadium, London
Attendance: 58,860
Referee: Felix Zwayer (Germany)

3 October 2023
21:00

Lens (France)	2–1	(England) Arsenal
Thomasson 25'; Wahi 69'	Report	Gabriel Jesus 14'

Stade Bollaert-Delelis, Lens
Attendance: 37,040
Referee: Marco Guida (Italy)
3 October 2023
21:00

PSV Eindhoven (Netherlands)	2–2	(Spain) Sevilla
De Jong 86' (pen.); Teze 90+5'	Report	Gudelj 68'; En-Nesyri 87'

Philips Stadion, Eindhoven
Attendance: 34,206
Referee: Daniele Orsato (Italy)

24 October 2023
21:00

Sevilla (Spain)	1–2	(England) Arsenal
Gudelj 58'	Report	Martinelli 45+4'; Gabriel Jesus 53'

Ramón Sánchez Pizjuán, Seville
Attendance: 39,595
Referee: Glenn Nyberg (Sweden)
24 October 2023
21:00

Lens (France)	1–1	(Netherlands) PSV Eindhoven
Wahi 65'	Report	Bakayoko 54'

Stade Bollaert-Delelis, Lens
Attendance: 38,133
Referee: Radu Petrescu (Romania)

8 November 2023
21:00 (20:00 UTC+0)

Arsenal (England)	2–0	(Spain) Sevilla
Trossard 29'; Saka 64'	Report

Emirates Stadium, London
Attendance: 60,024
Referee: István Kovács (Romania)
8 November 2023
21:00

PSV Eindhoven (Netherlands)	1–0	(France) Lens
De Jong 12'	Report

Philips Stadion, Eindhoven
Attendance: 34,200
Referee: Daniel Siebert (Germany)

29 November 2023
18:45

Sevilla (Spain)	2–3	(Netherlands) PSV Eindhoven
Ramos 24'; En-Nesyri 47'	Report	Saibari 68'; Gudelj 81' (o.g.); Pepi 90+2'

Ramón Sánchez Pizjuán, Seville
Attendance: 29,403
Referee: Davide Massa (Italy)
29 November 2023
21:00 (20:00 UTC+0)

Arsenal (England)	6–0	(France) Lens
Havertz 13'; Gabriel Jesus 21'; Saka 23'; Martinelli 27'; Ødegaard 45+1'; Jorginho 86' (pen.)	Report

Emirates Stadium, London
Attendance: 59,987
Referee: Artur Soares Dias (Portugal)

12 December 2023
18:45

Lens (France)	2–1	(Spain) Sevilla
Frankowski 63' (pen.); Fulgini 90+6'	Report	Ramos 79' (pen.)

Stade Bollaert-Delelis, Lens
Attendance: 37,456
Referee: Felix Zwayer (Germany)
12 December 2023
18:45

PSV Eindhoven (Netherlands)	1–1	(England) Arsenal
Vertessen 50'	Report	Nketiah 42'

Philips Stadion, Eindhoven
Attendance: 35,000
Referee: Tobias Stieler (Germany)

=== Group C ===
Pos	Team	Pld	W	D	L	GF	GA	GD	Pts	Qualification	RMA	NAP	BRA	UNB
1	(Spain) Real Madrid	6	6	0	0	16	7	+9	18	Advance to knockout phase	—	4–2	3–0	1–0
2	(Italy) Napoli	6	3	1	2	10	9	+1	10	Advance to knockout phase	2–3	—	2–0	1–1
3	(Portugal) Braga	6	1	1	4	6	12	−6	4	Transfer to Europa League	1–2	1–2	—	1–1
4	(Germany) Union Berlin	6	0	2	4	6	10	−4	2		2–3	0–1	2–3	—

Source: UEFA
Rules for classification: Group stage tiebreakers
20 September 2023
18:45

Real Madrid (Spain)	1–0	(Germany) Union Berlin
Bellingham 90+4'	Report

Santiago Bernabéu, Madrid
Attendance: 65,207
Referee: Espen Eskås (Norway)
20 September 2023
21:00 (20:00 UTC+1)

Braga (Portugal)	1–2	(Italy) Napoli
Bruma 84'	Report	Di Lorenzo 45+1'; Niakaté 88' (o.g.)

Estádio Municipal, Braga
Attendance: 18,422
Referee: Serdar Gözübüyük (Netherlands)

3 October 2023
18:45

Union Berlin (Germany)	2–3	(Portugal) Braga
Becker 30', 37'	Report	Niakaté 41'; Bruma 51'; Castro 90+4'

Olympiastadion, Berlin (Note: Union Berlin played their home matches at the Olympiastadion, in Berlin, instead of their regular stadium, Stadion An der Alten Försterei, in Berlin.)
Attendance: 73,445
Referee: Srđan Jovanović (Serbia)
3 October 2023
21:00

Napoli (Italy)	2–3	(Spain) Real Madrid
Østigård 19'; Zieliński 54' (pen.)	Report	Vinícius 27'; Bellingham 34'; Meret 78' (o.g.)

Stadio Diego Armando Maradona, Naples
Attendance: 51,649
Referee: Clément Turpin (France)

24 October 2023
21:00 (20:00 UTC+1)

Braga (Portugal)	1–2	(Spain) Real Madrid
Djaló 63'	Report	Rodrygo 16'; Bellingham 61'

Estádio Municipal, Braga
Attendance: 29,820
Referee: Michael Oliver (England)
24 October 2023
21:00

Union Berlin (Germany)	0–1	(Italy) Napoli
	Report	Raspadori 65'

Olympiastadion, Berlin
Attendance: 72,062
Referee: Irfan Peljto (Bosnia and Herzegovina)

8 November 2023
18:45

Napoli (Italy)	1–1	(Germany) Union Berlin
Politano 39'	Report	Fofana 52'

Stadio Diego Armando Maradona, Naples
Attendance: 42,449
Referee: Danny Makkelie (Netherlands)
8 November 2023
21:00

Real Madrid (Spain)	3–0	(Portugal) Braga
Brahim 27'; Vinícius 58'; Rodrygo 61'	Report

Santiago Bernabéu, Madrid
Attendance: 68,509
Referee: Halil Umut Meler (Turkey)

29 November 2023
21:00

Real Madrid (Spain)	4–2	(Italy) Napoli
Rodrygo 11'; Bellingham 22'; Paz 84'; Joselu 90+4'	Report	Simeone 9'; Zambo Anguissa 47'

Santiago Bernabéu, Madrid
Attendance: 73,562
Referee: François Letexier (France)
29 November 2023
21:00 (20:00 UTC+0)

Braga (Portugal)	1–1	(Germany) Union Berlin
Djaló 51'	Report	Gosens 42'

Estádio Municipal, Braga
Attendance: 15,855
Referee: Clément Turpin (France)

12 December 2023
21:00

Napoli (Italy)	2–0	(Portugal) Braga
Saatçı 9' (o.g.); Osimhen 33'	Report

Stadio Diego Armando Maradona, Naples
Attendance: 37,841
Referee: Slavko Vinčić (Slovenia)
12 December 2023
21:00

Union Berlin (Germany)	2–3	(Spain) Real Madrid
Volland 45+1'; Král 85'	Report	Joselu 61', 72'; Ceballos 89'

Olympiastadion, Berlin
Attendance: 73,420
Referee: Rade Obrenovič (Slovenia)

=== Group D ===
Pos	Team	Pld	W	D	L	GF	GA	GD	Pts	Qualification	RSO	INT	BEN	SAL
1	(Spain) Real Sociedad	6	3	3	0	7	2	+5	12 (Note: Tied on head-to-head points, goal difference, and goals scored. Goal difference in all matches: Real Sociedad +5, Inter Milan +3.)	Advance to knockout phase	—	1–1	3–1	0–0
2	(Italy) Inter Milan	6	3	3	0	8	5	+3	12	Advance to knockout phase	0–0	—	1–0	2–1
3	(Portugal) Benfica	6	1	1	4	7	11	−4	4 (Note: Tied on head-to-head points, goal difference, goals scored, and goal difference in all matches. Goals scored in all matches: Benfica 7, Red Bull Salzburg 4.)	Transfer to Europa League	0–1	3–3	—	0–2
4	(Austria) Red Bull Salzburg	6	1	1	4	4	8	−4	4		0–2	0–1	1–3	—

Source: UEFA
Rules for classification: Group stage tiebreakers
Notes:
20 September 2023
21:00

Real Sociedad (Spain)	1–1	(Italy) Inter Milan
Méndez 4'	Report	Martínez 87'

Anoeta, San Sebastián
Attendance: 36,591
Referee: Michael Oliver (England)
20 September 2023
21:00 (20:00 UTC+1)

Benfica (Portugal)	0–2	(Austria) Red Bull Salzburg
	Report	Šimić 15' (pen.); Gloukh 51'

Estádio da Luz, Lisbon
Attendance: 60,917
Referee: Halil Umut Meler (Turkey)

3 October 2023
18:45

Red Bull Salzburg (Austria)	0–2	(Spain) Real Sociedad
	Report	Oyarzabal 7'; Méndez 27'

Red Bull Arena, Salzburg
Attendance: 28,227
Referee: Bartosz Frankowski (Poland)
3 October 2023
21:00

Inter Milan (Italy)	1–0	(Portugal) Benfica
Thuram 62'	Report

San Siro, Milan
Attendance: 66,573
Referee: Danny Makkelie (Netherlands)

24 October 2023
18:45

Inter Milan (Italy)	2–1	(Austria) Red Bull Salzburg
Sánchez 19'; Çalhanoğlu 64' (pen.)	Report	Gloukh 57'

San Siro, Milan
Attendance: 71,825
Referee: François Letexier (France)
24 October 2023
21:00 (20:00 UTC+1)

Benfica (Portugal)	0–1	(Spain) Real Sociedad
	Report	Méndez 63'

Estádio da Luz, Lisbon
Attendance: 56,002
Referee: Clément Turpin (France)

8 November 2023
18:45

Real Sociedad (Spain)	3–1	(Portugal) Benfica
Merino 6'; Oyarzabal 11'; Barrenetxea 21'	Report	R. Silva 49'

Anoeta, San Sebastián
Attendance: 36,815
Referee: Anthony Taylor (England)
8 November 2023
21:00

Red Bull Salzburg (Austria)	0–1	(Italy) Inter Milan
	Report	Martínez 85' (pen.)

Red Bull Arena, Salzburg
Attendance: 30,071
Referee: Serdar Gözübüyük (Netherlands)

29 November 2023
21:00 (20:00 UTC+0)

Benfica (Portugal)	3–3	(Italy) Inter Milan
João Mário 5', 13', 34'	Report	Arnautović 51'; Frattesi 58'; Sánchez 72' (pen.)

Estádio da Luz, Lisbon
Attendance: 52,944
Referee: Andris Treimanis (Latvia)
29 November 2023
21:00

Real Sociedad (Spain)	0–0	(Austria) Red Bull Salzburg
	Report

Anoeta, San Sebastián
Attendance: 34,419
Referee: Mykola Balakin (Ukraine)

12 December 2023
21:00

Inter Milan (Italy)	0–0	(Spain) Real Sociedad
	Report

San Siro, Milan
Attendance: 69,010
Referee: Sandro Schärer (Switzerland)
12 December 2023
21:00

Red Bull Salzburg (Austria)	1–3	(Portugal) Benfica
Sučić 57'	Report	Di María 32'; R. Silva 45+1'; Cabral 90+2'

Red Bull Arena, Salzburg
Attendance: 27,134
Referee: Daniel Siebert (Germany)

=== Group E ===
Pos	Team	Pld	W	D	L	GF	GA	GD	Pts	Qualification	ATM	LAZ	FEY	CEL
1	(Spain) Atlético Madrid	6	4	2	0	17	6	+11	14	Advance to knockout phase	—	2–0	3–2	6–0
2	(Italy) Lazio	6	3	1	2	7	7	0	10	Advance to knockout phase	1–1	—	1–0	2–0
3	(Netherlands) Feyenoord	6	2	0	4	9	10	−1	6	Transfer to Europa League	1–3	3–1	—	2–0
4	(Scotland) Celtic	6	1	1	4	5	15	−10	4		2–2	1–2	2–1	—

Source: UEFA
Rules for classification: Group stage tiebreakers
19 September 2023
21:00

Feyenoord (Netherlands)	2–0	(Scotland) Celtic
Stengs 45+2'; Jahanbakhsh 76'	Report

De Kuip, Rotterdam
Attendance: 44,008
Referee: Irfan Peljto (Bosnia and Herzegovina)
19 September 2023
21:00

Lazio (Italy)	1–1	(Spain) Atlético Madrid
Provedel 90+5'	Report	Barrios 29'

Stadio Olimpico, Rome
Attendance: 46,168
Referee: Slavko Vinčić (Slovenia)

4 October 2023
18:45

Atlético Madrid (Spain)	3–2	(Netherlands) Feyenoord
Morata 12', 47'; Griezmann 45+4'	Report	Hermoso 7' (o.g.); Hancko 34'

Metropolitano Stadium, Madrid
Attendance: 61,742
Referee: François Letexier (France)
4 October 2023
21:00 (20:00 UTC+1)

Celtic (Scotland)	1–2	(Italy) Lazio
Furuhashi 12'	Report	Vecino 29'; Pedro 90+5'

Celtic Park, Glasgow
Attendance: 56,063
Referee: Donatas Rumšas (Lithuania)

25 October 2023
18:45

Feyenoord (Netherlands)	3–1	(Italy) Lazio
Giménez 31', 74'; Zerrouki 45+2'	Report	Pedro 83' (pen.)

De Kuip, Rotterdam
Attendance: 44,031
Referee: Tobias Stieler (Germany)
25 October 2023
21:00 (20:00 UTC+1)

Celtic (Scotland)	2–2	(Spain) Atlético Madrid
Furuhashi 4'; Palma 28'	Report	Griezmann 25'; Morata 53'

Celtic Park, Glasgow
Attendance: 55,844
Referee: Felix Zwayer (Germany)

7 November 2023
21:00

Atlético Madrid (Spain)	6–0	(Scotland) Celtic
Griezmann 6', 60'; Morata 45+2', 76'; Lino 66'; Saúl 84'	Report

Metropolitano Stadium, Madrid
Attendance: 60,863
Referee: Ivan Kružliak (Slovakia)
7 November 2023
21:00

Lazio (Italy)	1–0	(Netherlands) Feyenoord
Immobile 45+1'	Report

Stadio Olimpico, Rome
Attendance: 36,612
Referee: Szymon Marciniak (Poland)

28 November 2023
18:45

Lazio (Italy)	2–0	(Scotland) Celtic
Immobile 82', 85'	Report

Stadio Olimpico, Rome
Attendance: 50,555
Referee: Halil Umut Meler (Turkey)
28 November 2023
21:00

Feyenoord (Netherlands)	1–3	(Spain) Atlético Madrid
Wieffer 77'	Report	Geertruida 14' (o.g.); Hermoso 57'; Giménez 81' (o.g.)

De Kuip, Rotterdam
Attendance: 43,992
Referee: Anthony Taylor (England)

13 December 2023
21:00

Atlético Madrid (Spain)	2–0	(Italy) Lazio
Griezmann 6'; Lino 51'	Report

Metropolitano Stadium, Madrid
Attendance: 63,574
Referee: Serdar Gözübüyük (Netherlands)
13 December 2023
21:00 (20:00 UTC+0)

Celtic (Scotland)	2–1	(Netherlands) Feyenoord
Palma 33' (pen.); Lagerbielke 90+1'	Report	Minteh 82'

Celtic Park, Glasgow
Attendance: 56,391
Referee: Benoît Bastien (France)

=== Group F ===
Pos	Team	Pld	W	D	L	GF	GA	GD	Pts	Qualification	DOR	PAR	MIL	NEW
1	(Germany) Borussia Dortmund	6	3	2	1	7	4	+3	11	Advance to knockout phase	—	1–1	0–0	2–0
2	(France) Paris Saint-Germain	6	2	2	2	9	8	+1	8 (Note: Tied on head-to-head points. Head-to-head goal difference: Paris Saint-Germain +2, Milan −2.)	Advance to knockout phase	2–0	—	3–0	1–1
3	(Italy) Milan	6	2	2	2	5	8	−3	8	Transfer to Europa League	1–3	2–1	—	0–0
4	(England) Newcastle United	6	1	2	3	6	7	−1	5		0–1	4–1	1–2	—

Source: UEFA
Rules for classification: Group stage tiebreakers
Notes:
19 September 2023
18:45

Milan (Italy)	0–0	(England) Newcastle United
	Report

San Siro, Milan
Attendance: 65,695
Referee: José María Sánchez Martínez (Spain)
19 September 2023
21:00

Paris Saint-Germain (France)	2–0	(Germany) Borussia Dortmund
Mbappé 49' (pen.); Hakimi 58'	Report

Parc des Princes, Paris
Attendance: 47,379
Referee: Jesús Gil Manzano (Spain)

4 October 2023
21:00

Borussia Dortmund (Germany)	0–0	(Italy) Milan
	Report

Westfalenstadion, Dortmund
Attendance: 81,365
Referee: Szymon Marciniak (Poland)
4 October 2023
21:00 (20:00 UTC+1)

Newcastle United (England)	4–1	(France) Paris Saint-Germain
Almirón 17'; Burn 39'; Longstaff 50'; Schär 90+1'	Report	Hernandez 56'

St James' Park, Newcastle upon Tyne
Attendance: 52,009
Referee: István Kovács (Romania)

25 October 2023
21:00

Paris Saint-Germain (France)	3–0	(Italy) Milan
Mbappé 32'; Kolo Muani 53'; Lee Kang-in 89'	Report

Parc des Princes, Paris
Attendance: 47,356
Referee: Slavko Vinčić (Slovenia)
25 October 2023
21:00 (20:00 UTC+1)

Newcastle United (England)	0–1	(Germany) Borussia Dortmund
	Report	Nmecha 45'

St James' Park, Newcastle upon Tyne
Attendance: 52,024
Referee: Artur Soares Dias (Portugal)

7 November 2023
18:45

Borussia Dortmund (Germany)	2–0	(England) Newcastle United
Füllkrug 26'; Brandt 79'	Report

Westfalenstadion, Dortmund
Attendance: 81,365
Referee: Alejandro Hernández Hernández (Spain)
7 November 2023
21:00

Milan (Italy)	2–1	(France) Paris Saint-Germain
Leão 12'; Giroud 50'	Report	Škriniar 9'

San Siro, Milan
Attendance: 75,649
Referee: Jesús Gil Manzano (Spain)

28 November 2023
21:00

Paris Saint-Germain (France)	1–1	(England) Newcastle United
Mbappé 90+8' (pen.)	Report	Isak 24'

Parc des Princes, Paris
Attendance: 46,435
Referee: Szymon Marciniak (Poland)
28 November 2023
21:00

Milan (Italy)	1–3	(Germany) Borussia Dortmund
Chukwueze 37'	Report	Reus 10' (pen.); Bynoe-Gittens 59'; Adeyemi 69'

San Siro, Milan
Attendance: 75,292
Referee: István Kovács (Romania)

13 December 2023
21:00

Borussia Dortmund (Germany)	1–1	(France) Paris Saint-Germain
Adeyemi 51'	Report	Zaïre-Emery 56'

Westfalenstadion, Dortmund
Attendance: 81,365
Referee: Glenn Nyberg (Sweden)
13 December 2023
21:00 (20:00 UTC+0)

Newcastle United (England)	1–2	(Italy) Milan
Joelinton 33'	Report	Pulisic 59'; Chukwueze 84'

St James' Park, Newcastle upon Tyne
Attendance: 52,037
Referee: Danny Makkelie (Netherlands)

=== Group G ===
Pos	Team	Pld	W	D	L	GF	GA	GD	Pts	Qualification	MCI	RBL	YB	RSB
1	(England) Manchester City	6	6	0	0	18	7	+11	18	Advance to knockout phase	—	3–2	3–0	3–1
2	(Germany) RB Leipzig	6	4	0	2	13	10	+3	12	Advance to knockout phase	1–3	—	2–1	3–1
3	(Switzerland) Young Boys	6	1	1	4	7	13	−6	4	Transfer to Europa League	1–3	1–3	—	2–0
4	(Serbia) Red Star Belgrade	6	0	1	5	7	15	−8	1		2–3	1–2	2–2	—

Source: UEFA
Rules for classification: Group stage tiebreakers
19 September 2023
18:45

Young Boys (Switzerland)	1–3	(Germany) RB Leipzig
Elia 33'	Report	Simakan 3'; Schlager 73'; Šeško 90+2'

Stadion Wankdorf, Bern
Attendance: 31,500
Referee: Enea Jorgji (Albania)
19 September 2023
21:00 (20:00 UTC+1)

Manchester City (England)	3–1	(Serbia) Red Star Belgrade
Alvarez 47', 60'; Rodri 73'	Report	Bukari 45'

City of Manchester Stadium, Manchester
Attendance: 50,204
Referee: João Pinheiro (Portugal)

4 October 2023
21:00

RB Leipzig (Germany)	1–3	(England) Manchester City
Openda 48'	Report	Foden 25'; Alvarez 84'; Doku 90+2'

Red Bull Arena, Leipzig
Attendance: 45,228
Referee: Artur Soares Dias (Portugal)
4 October 2023
21:00

Red Star Belgrade (Serbia)	2–2	(Switzerland) Young Boys
Ndiaye 35'; Bukari 88'	Report	Ugrinic 48'; Itten 61' (pen.)

Rajko Mitić Stadium, Belgrade
Attendance: 47,201
Referee: Willie Collum (Scotland)

25 October 2023
21:00

RB Leipzig (Germany)	3–1	(Serbia) Red Star Belgrade
Raum 12'; Simons 59'; Olmo 84'	Report	Stamenić 70'

Red Bull Arena, Leipzig
Attendance: 42,209
Referee: José María Sánchez Martínez (Spain)
25 October 2023
21:00

Young Boys (Switzerland)	1–3	(England) Manchester City
Elia 52'	Report	Akanji 48'; Haaland 67' (pen.), 86'

Stadion Wankdorf, Bern
Attendance: 31,500
Referee: Morten Krogh (Denmark)

7 November 2023
21:00 (20:00 UTC+0)

Manchester City (England)	3–0	(Switzerland) Young Boys
Haaland 23' (pen.), 51'; Foden 45+1'	Report

City of Manchester Stadium, Manchester
Attendance: 51,049
Referee: Erik Lambrechts (Belgium)
7 November 2023
21:00

Red Star Belgrade (Serbia)	1–2	(Germany) RB Leipzig
Henrichs 81' (o.g.)	Report	Simons 8'; Openda 77'

Rajko Mitić Stadium, Belgrade
Attendance: 41,961
Referee: Daniele Orsato (Italy)

28 November 2023
21:00 (20:00 UTC+0)

Manchester City (England)	3–2	(Germany) RB Leipzig
Haaland 54'; Foden 70'; Alvarez 87'	Report	Openda 13', 33'

City of Manchester Stadium, Manchester
Attendance: 51,402
Referee: Glenn Nyberg (Sweden)
28 November 2023
21:00

Young Boys (Switzerland)	2–0	(Serbia) Red Star Belgrade
Nedeljković 8' (o.g.); Blum 29'	Report

Stadion Wankdorf, Bern
Attendance: 31,500
Referee: Danny Makkelie (Netherlands)

13 December 2023
18:45

RB Leipzig (Germany)	2–1	(Switzerland) Young Boys
Šeško 51'; Forsberg 56'	Report	Colley 53'

Red Bull Arena, Leipzig
Attendance: 43,331
Referee: Manfredas Lukjančukas (Lithuania)
13 December 2023
18:45

Red Star Belgrade (Serbia)	2–3	(England) Manchester City
Hwang In-beom 76'; Katai 90+1'	Report	Hamilton 19'; Bobb 62'; Phillips 85' (pen.)

Rajko Mitić Stadium, Belgrade
Attendance: 49,443
Referee: Aliyar Aghayev (Azerbaijan)

=== Group H ===
Pos	Team	Pld	W	D	L	GF	GA	GD	Pts	Qualification	BAR	POR	SHK	ANT
1	(Spain) Barcelona	6	4	0	2	12	6	+6	12 (Note: Head-to-head points: Barcelona 6, Porto 0.)	Advance to knockout phase	—	2–1	2–1	5–0
2	(Portugal) Porto	6	4	0	2	15	8	+7	12	Advance to knockout phase	0–1	—	5–3	2–0
3	(Ukraine) Shakhtar Donetsk	6	3	0	3	10	12	−2	9	Transfer to Europa League	1–0	1–3	—	1–0
4	(Belgium) Antwerp	6	1	0	5	6	17	−11	3		3–2	1–4	2–3	—

Source: UEFA
Rules for classification: Group stage tiebreakers
Notes:
19 September 2023
21:00

Barcelona (Spain)	5–0	(Belgium) Antwerp
Félix 11', 66'; Lewandowski 19'; Bataille 22' (o.g.); Gavi 54'	Report

Estadi Olímpic Lluís Companys, Barcelona (Note: Barcelona played their home matches at the Estadi Olímpic Lluís Companys, in Barcelona, instead of their regular stadium, Camp Nou, in Barcelona, which was being renovated.)
Attendance: 40,989
Referee: Radu Petrescu (Romania)
19 September 2023
21:00

Shakhtar Donetsk (Ukraine)	1–3	(Portugal) Porto
Kelsy 13'	Report	Galeno 8', 15'; Taremi 29'

Volksparkstadion, Hamburg, Germany (Note: Due to the Russian invasion of Ukraine, Ukrainian teams were required to play their home matches at neutral venues until further notice.)
Attendance: 46,729
Referee: Davide Massa (Italy)

4 October 2023
18:45

Antwerp (Belgium)	2–3	(Ukraine) Shakhtar Donetsk
Muja 3'; Balikwisha 33'	Report	Sikan 48', 76'; Rakitskyi 71'

Bosuilstadion, Antwerp
Attendance: 13,509
Referee: Rade Obrenovič (Slovenia)
4 October 2023
21:00 (20:00 UTC+1)

Porto (Portugal)	0–1	(Spain) Barcelona
	Report	Torres 45+1'

Estádio do Dragão, Porto
Attendance: 49,722
Referee: Anthony Taylor (England)

25 October 2023
18:45

Barcelona (Spain)	2–1	(Ukraine) Shakhtar Donetsk
Torres 28'; López 36'	Report	Sudakov 62'

Estadi Olímpic Lluís Companys, Barcelona
Attendance: 41,409
Referee: Ivan Kružliak (Slovakia)
25 October 2023
21:00

Antwerp (Belgium)	1–4	(Portugal) Porto
Yusuf 37'	Report	Evanilson 46', 69', 84'; Eustáquio 54'

Bosuilstadion, Antwerp
Attendance: 13,651
Referee: Benoît Bastien (France)

7 November 2023
18:45

Shakhtar Donetsk (Ukraine)	1–0	(Spain) Barcelona
Sikan 40'	Report

Volksparkstadion, Hamburg, Germany
Attendance: 49,147
Referee: Irfan Peljto (Bosnia and Herzegovina)
7 November 2023
21:00 (20:00 UTC+0)

Porto (Portugal)	2–0	(Belgium) Antwerp
Evanilson 32' (pen.); Pepe 90+1'	Report

Estádio do Dragão, Porto
Attendance: 44,830
Referee: Maurizio Mariani (Italy)

28 November 2023
18:45

Shakhtar Donetsk (Ukraine)	1–0	(Belgium) Antwerp
Matviyenko 12'	Report

Volksparkstadion, Hamburg, Germany
Attendance: 47,209
Referee: Bartosz Frankowski (Poland)
28 November 2023
21:00

Barcelona (Spain)	2–1	(Portugal) Porto
Cancelo 32'; Félix 57'	Report	Pepê 30'

Estadi Olímpic Lluís Companys, Barcelona
Attendance: 43,533
Referee: Daniele Orsato (Italy)

13 December 2023
21:00 (20:00 UTC+0)

Porto (Portugal)	5–3	(Ukraine) Shakhtar Donetsk
Galeno 9', 43'; Taremi 62'; Pepe 75'; Conceição 82'	Report	Sikan 29'; Eustáquio 72' (o.g.); Eguinaldo 88'

Estádio do Dragão, Porto
Attendance: 48,113
Referee: István Kovács (Romania)
13 December 2023
21:00

Antwerp (Belgium)	3–2	(Spain) Barcelona
Vermeeren 2'; Janssen 56'; Ilenikhena 90+2'	Report	Torres 35'; Guiu 90+1'

Bosuilstadion, Antwerp
Attendance: 13,550
Referee: Marco Guida (Italy)
