= List of Arbëreshë people =

Arbëreshë people are ethnic Albanians settled in Southern Italy, or their descendants. Some have achieved notability in a wide variety of fields, in Italy or in other countries.

== Prime Ministers of Italy ==
- Francesco Crispi – Italy's Prime Minister from 1887 until 1891, among the main protagonists of the Italian Risorgimento.
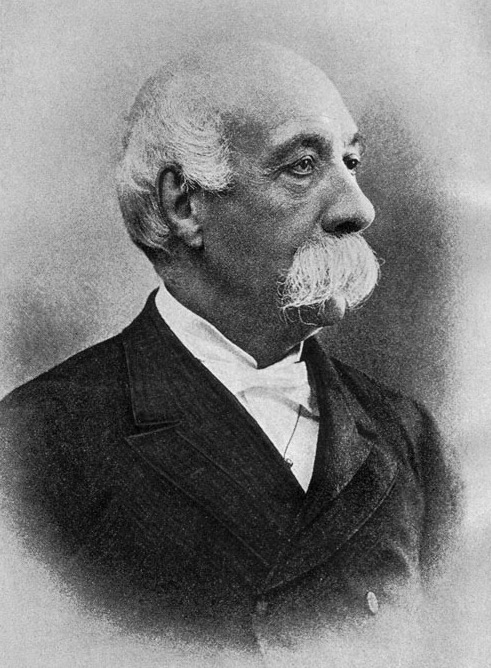
Francesco Crispi

== Politics ==
- Giorgio Basta – General of Holy Roman Empire
- Linda S. Mullenix - Legal author, Rita and Morris Atlas Chair in Advocacy, and professor at the University of Texas School of Law.
- Antonio Gramsci – Philosopher, writer, politician and political theorist – founding member and leader of the Communist Party of Italy
- Juan Pedro Aladro Kastriota – Spanish-Arbereshe nobleman, diplomat, and pretender of the throne of Albania
- Francesco Crispi - Former Prime minister of Italy, Noted for his role in Italian unification
- Giuseppe Salvatore Bellusci – Politician.
- Nicola Barbato – Doctor and politician, among the founders of the movement of the Fasci Siciliani Workers
- Joseph J. DioGuardi – Former US Congressman
- Victor Hugo Schiro – Two-term mayor (17 July 1961 – 2 May 1970) of New Orleans, Louisiana
- Terenzio Tocci – Politician
- Mario Tanassi – Italian politician, who was several times Minister of the Italian Republic
- Richard Caliguiri – Politician
- Basilio Giordano – Italian and Canadian politician and journalist
- Gennaro Placco – poet and prominent activist of the Risorgimento
- Stefano Rodotà – jurist and politician
- Marco Osnato – Italian politician
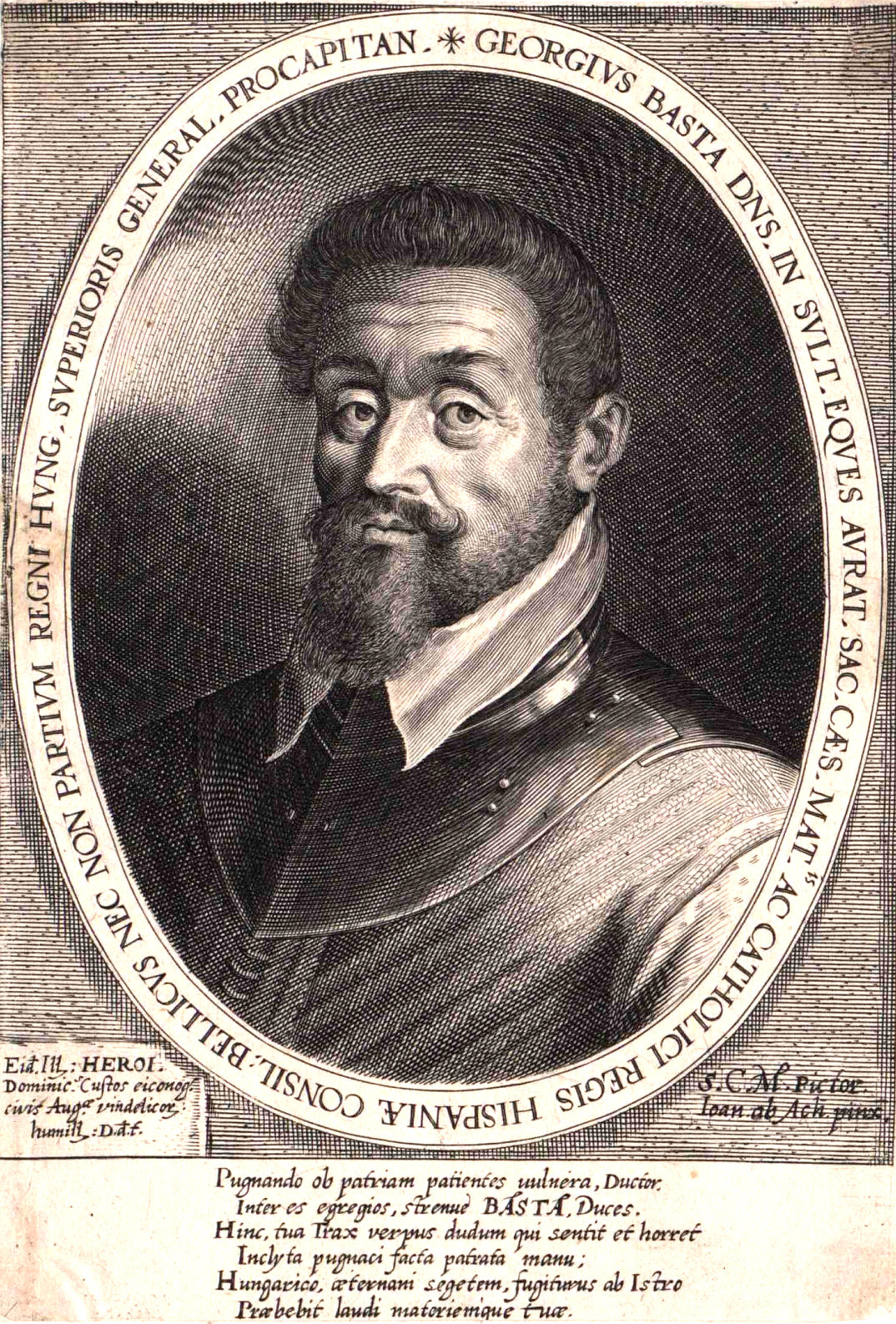
Giorgio Basta

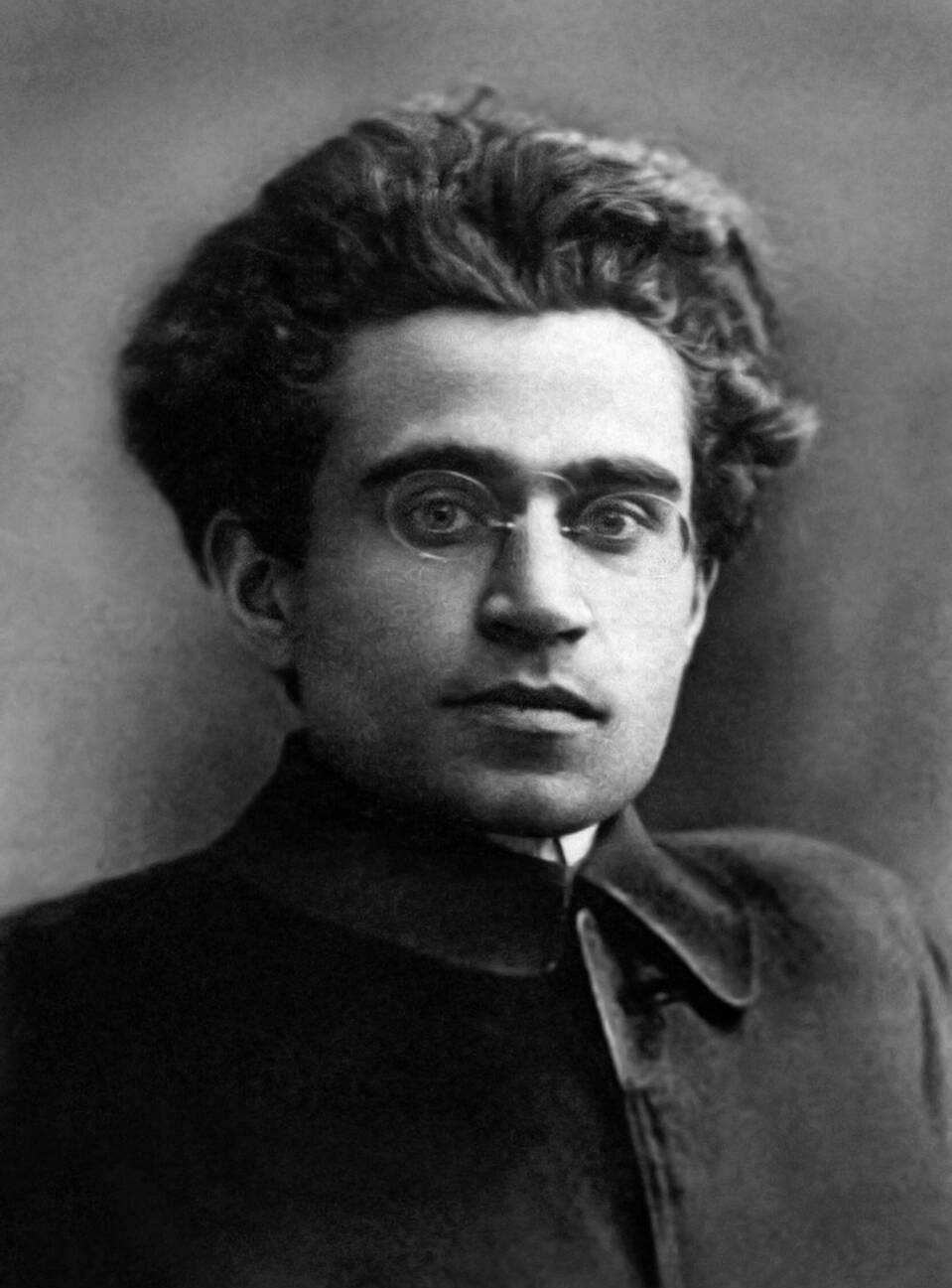
Antonio Gramsci

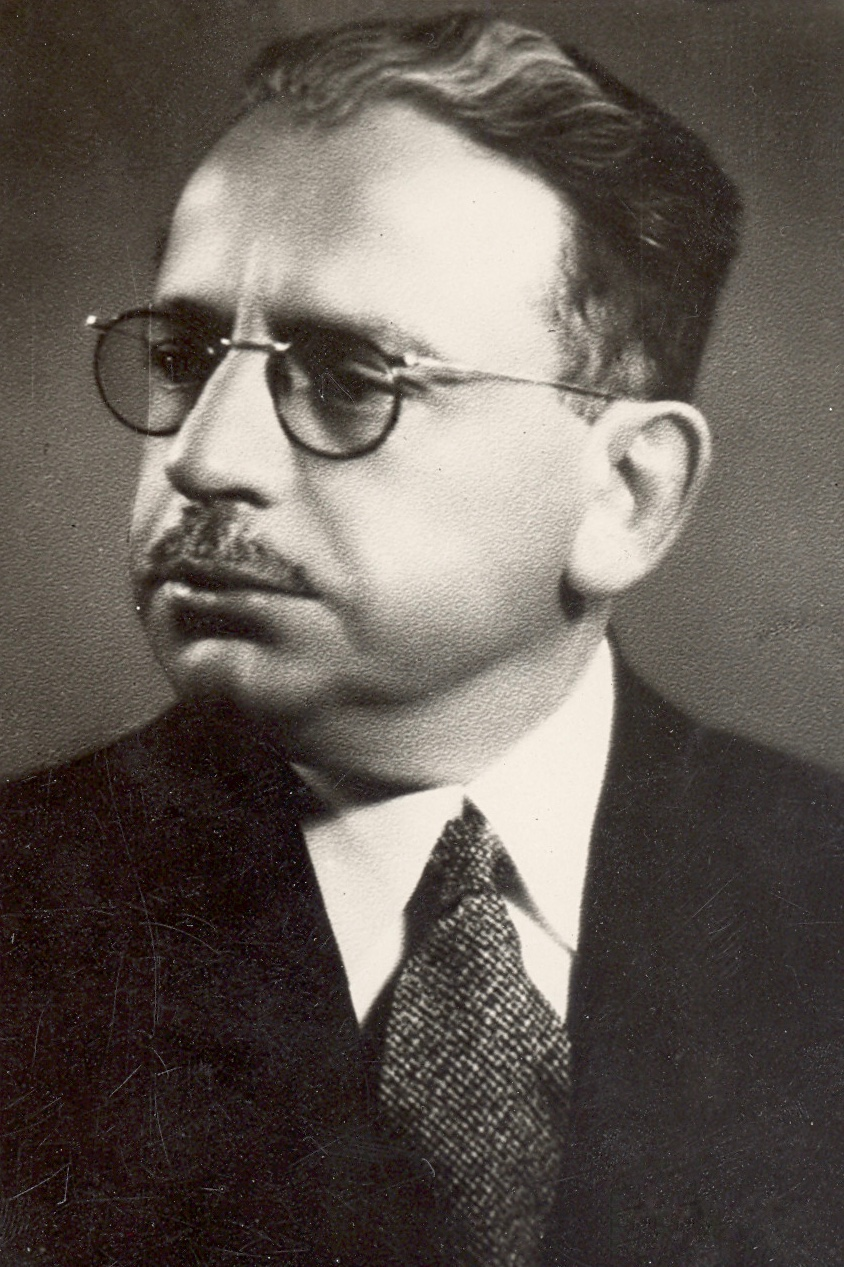
Terenzio Tocci

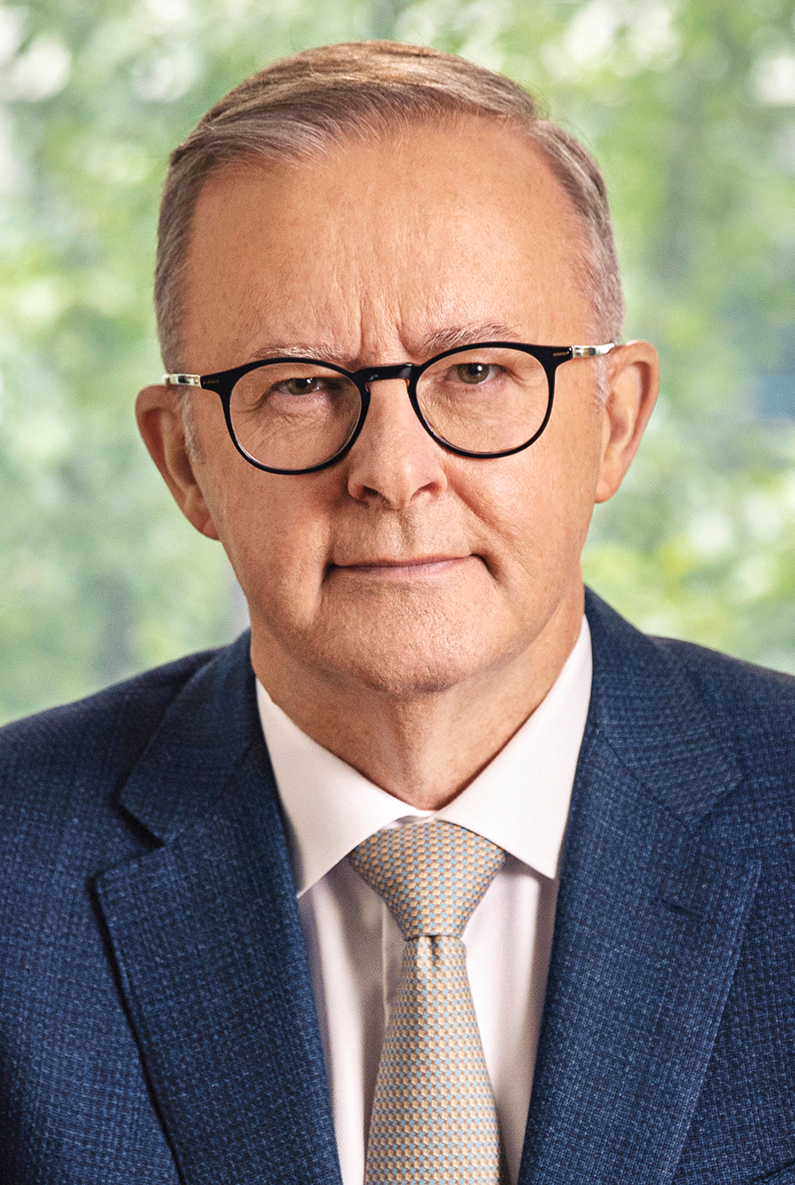
Anthony Albanese

== Science and academia ==
- Girolamo de Rada – Author and important figure of the Albanian National Awakening
- Giulio Variboba – Poet
- Giuseppe Serembe – Lyric poet.
- Carmine Abate – Novelist and short story writer.
- Domenico Bellizzi a.k.a. Vorea Ujko – Priest and poet
- Mario Bellizzi – Poet
- Bernardo Bilotta – Priest, poet and folklorist
- Demetrio Camarda – Byzantine rite priest, Albanian language scholar, historian, and philologist
- Nicola Chetta – Byzantine rite priest, ethnographic, writer and poet
- Giuseppe Crispi – Priest and philologist, one of the major figures of the Arbëresh community of Sicily of his time
- Giuseppe Schirò – Poet, linguist, publicist, folklorist and Albanian patriot, among the most representative figures of the Arbëreshë literature of the 19th century
- Gabriele Dara – Politician and poet, regarded as one of the early writers of the Albanian National Awakening.
- Leonardo Lala – Italian writer
- Giuseppe Schirò Di Maggio – Poet, journalist, essayist, playwright and writer, among the most influential and prolific exponents of contemporary Arbëreshë literature
- Eleuterio Francesco Fortino – Priest of the Italo-Albanian Church in Calabria and writer of the Byzantine and Albanian culture
- Angelo Masci – Writer
- Luca Matranga – Byzantine rite priest, one of the first writers in Albanian
- Francesco Antonio Santori – Writer, playwright and poet of the Albanian National Awakening
- Ferruccio Baffa Trasci – Bishop, theologian and philosopher
- Vincenzo Dorsa – scholar, writer and translator
- Tom Perrotta – American novelist and screenwriter
- Marco La Piana – Italian scholar of Arbëresh origin
- Ernesto Sabato – Argentine novelist, essayist, painter and physicist
- Maria Antonia Braile – Italian-arbëreshë writer and the first Albanian woman writer to ever publish literature in Albanian
- Francesco Altimari – Italian scholar in the field of Albanology
- Pasquale Scutari – Italian linguist and Albanologist
- Giuseppe Schirò (junior) – Italian scholar and literary historian
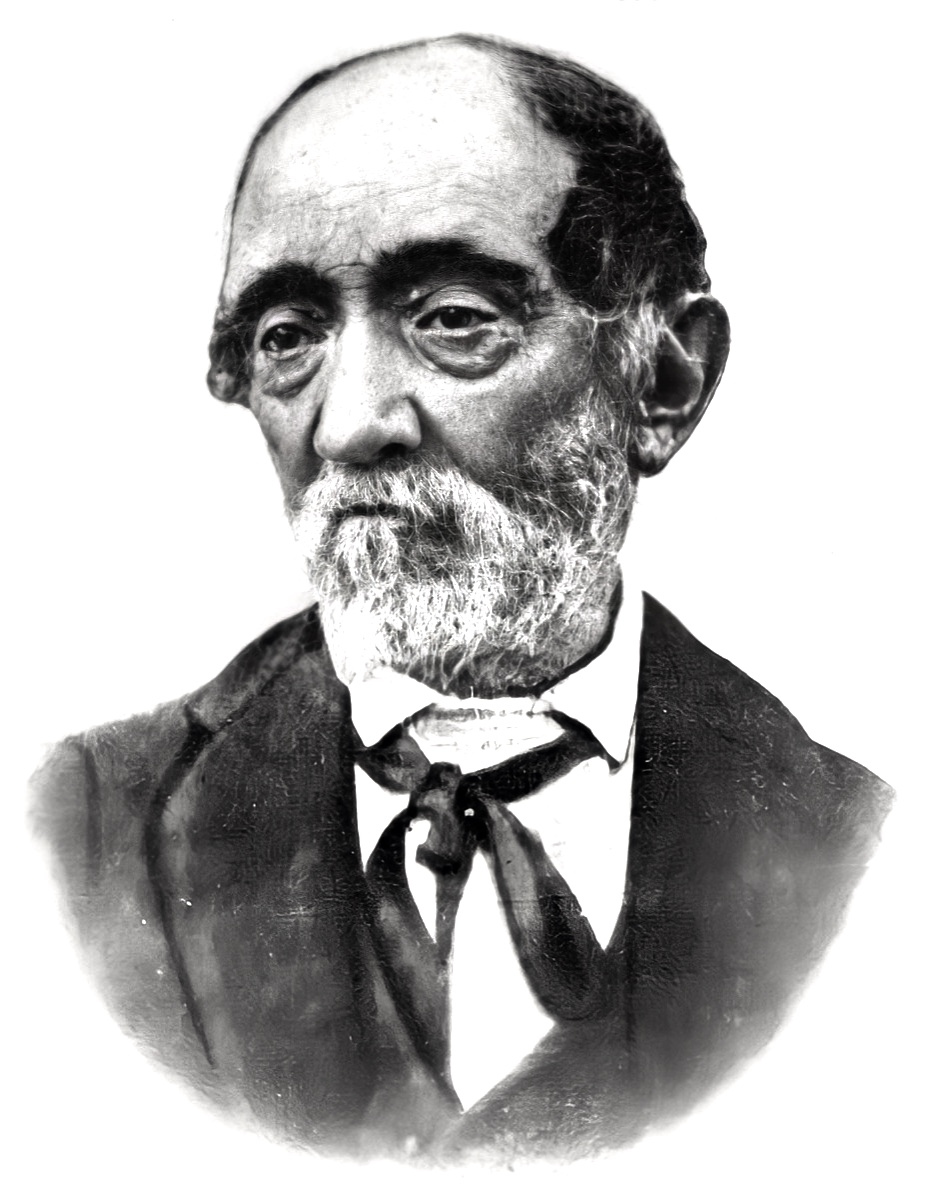
Girolamo de Rada

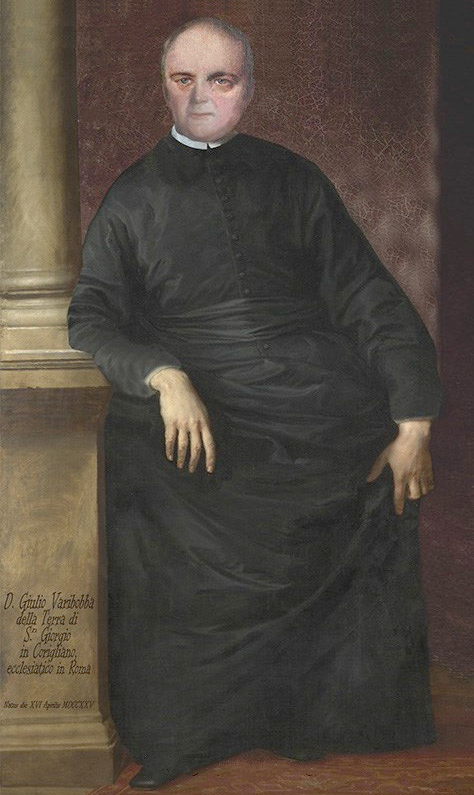
Giulio Variboba

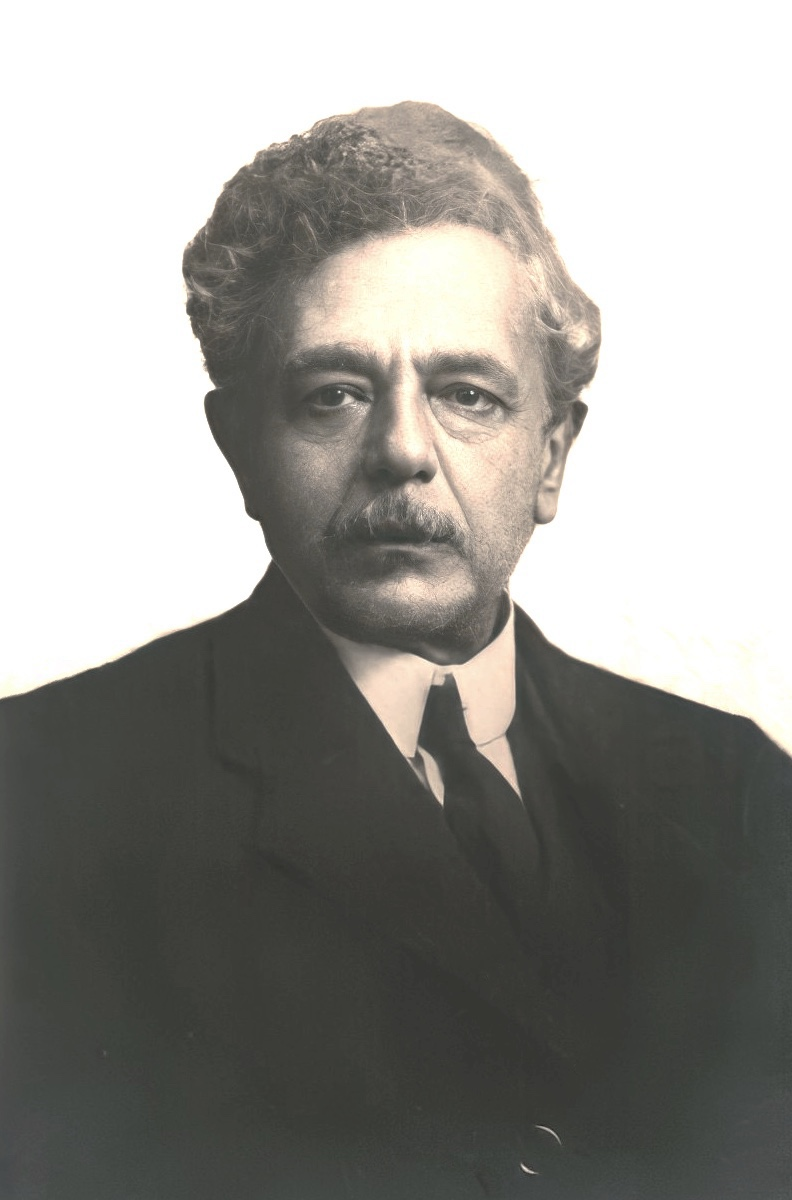
Giuseppe Schirò

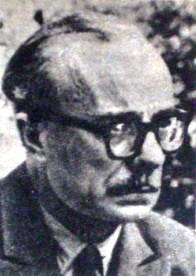
Ernesto Sabato

== Literature ==
- Daniela Gioseffi – poet, novelist, literary critic, essayist, and performer
- Pema Browne – American abstract artist
- Kristina Gentile Mandala – Albanian writer

== Military ==
- Mercurio Bua – Famed condottiero (stratioti captain) and commander of the Venetian army
- Theodore Bua – Albanian captain of stradioti regiments of the Republic of Venice
- Demetrio Reres – Calabrian nobleman
- Khoja Zufar – Captain, governor, merchant and General
- Demetrio Capuzzimati – Stradiot captain in Puglia
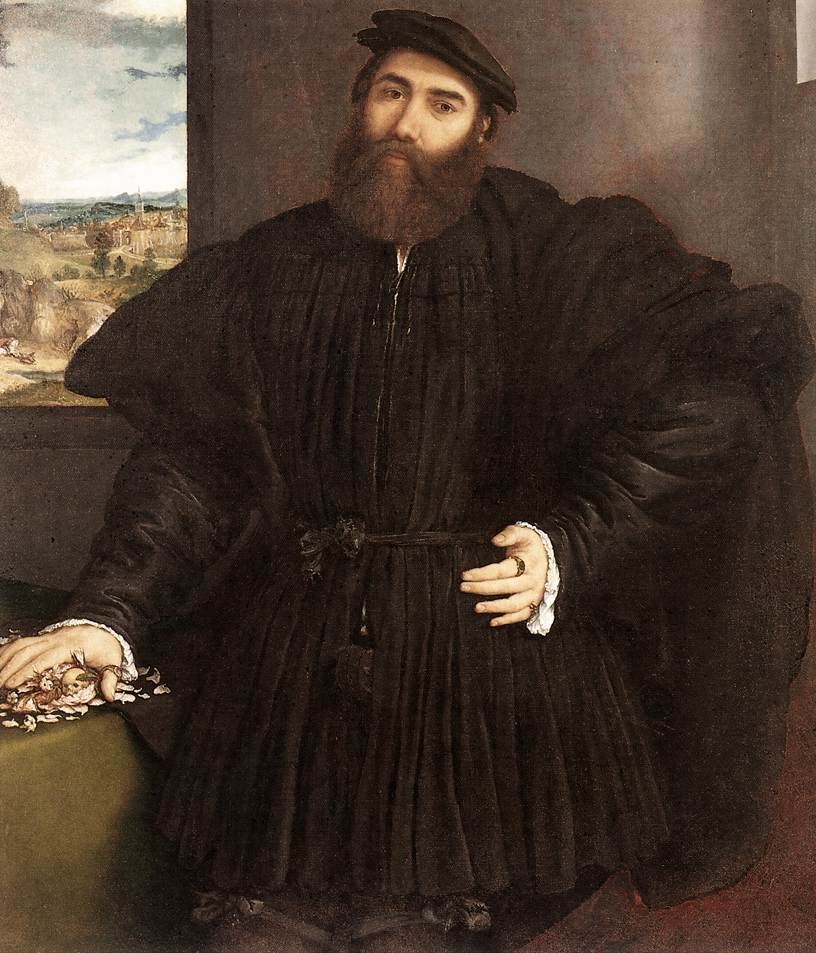
Mercurio Bua

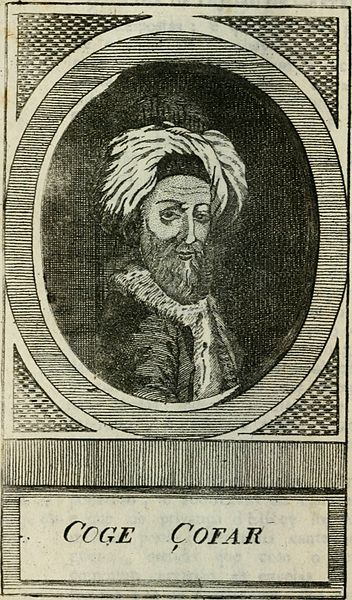
Khoja Zufar

== Business and civil society ==
- Enrico Cuccia – Banker, founder of Mediobanca and important figure in Italian post-war industrial reconstruction.
- James J. Schiro – American business man
- Nicolas Berggruen – Philanthropist and investor
- Anselmo Lorecchio – Italian lawyer, journalist, politician, poet and writer
- Luigi Giura – Engineer and architect.
- Ercole Lupinacci – Bishop of the Italo-Albanian Church of Eparchy of Lungro.
- Ofelia Giudicissi Curci – Italian poet and archeologist
- Vaccaro brothers – Italian-American businessmen
- Andrew Kaczynski – Journalist and editor for CNN.
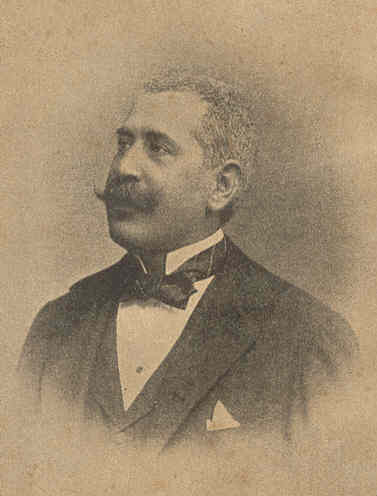
Anselmo Lorecchio

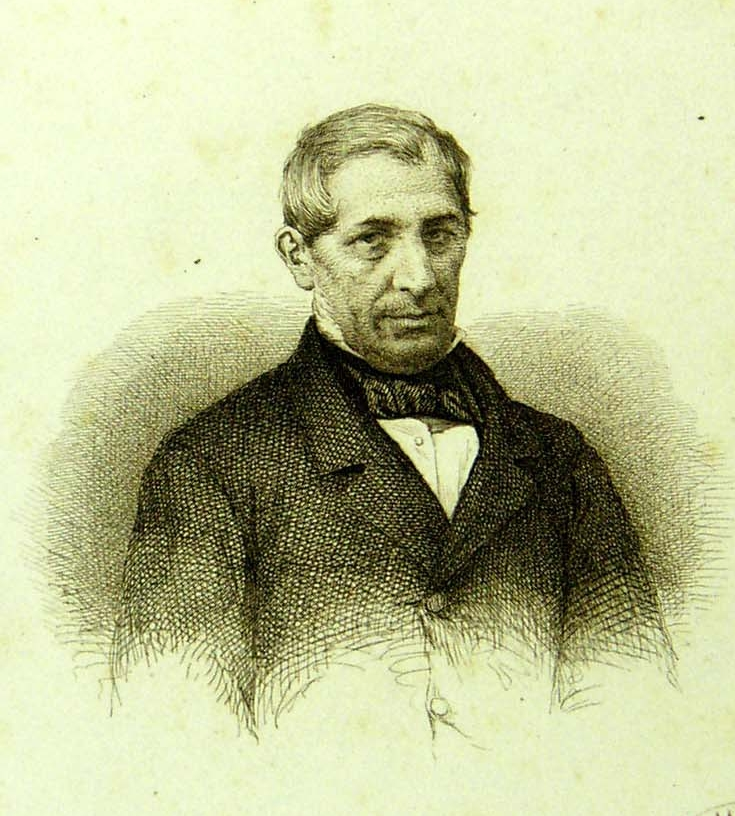
Luigi Giura

== Religious ==
- Sotir Ferrara – Bishop of the Italo-Albanian Church of Eparchy of Piana degli Albanesi.
- Pope Clement XI
- Giovanni Mele – Bishop of the Eparchy of Lungro, a diocese of the Italo-Albanian Catholic Church in Calabria, Italy
- Donato Oliverio – Bishop of the Eparchy of Lungro, a diocese of the Italo-Albanian Catholic Church in Calabria, Italy
- Giorgio Demetrio Gallaro – Bishop of the Eparchy of Piana degli Albanesi, a diocese of the Italo-Albanian Catholic Church in Sicily, Italy
- Michele Scutari, archpriest and poet
- Nikollë Filja – Arbëreshë Byzantine rite priest, and writer of the 18th century
- Antonio Ciliberti – Roman Catholic archbishop
- Gian Girolamo Albani – Italian Roman Catholic cardinal
- Giuseppe Schirò (archbishop) – Arbëreshë writer of the 18th century
- Ferruccio Baffa Trasci – Italian bishop, theologian and philosopher
- Eleuterio Francesco Fortino – Italian priest of the Italo-Albanian Catholic Church
- Pietro Parente – Long-serving theologian in the Holy Office of the Roman Catholic Church
- Raffaele Castielli – Italian bishop
- Arberia Parish – Eastern Orthodox Christian parish
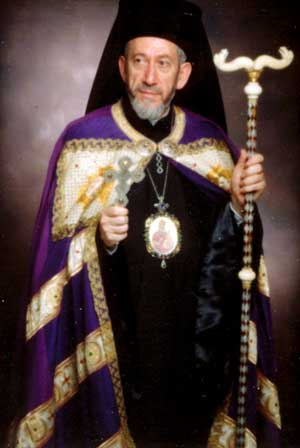
Sotir Ferrara

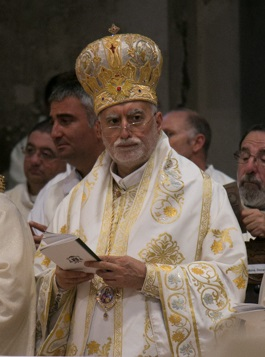
Donato Oliverio

== Cinema ==
- Danny DeVito – American actor
- Regis Philbin – American media personality and occasional actor and singer
- Aleksandër Moisiu – Austrian stage actor
- Bettina Moissi – German stage and film actress
- Gedeon Burkhard – German film and television actor
- Alan Barillaro – Canadian director, animator and writer
- J. J. Philbin – American producer and screenwriter
- Aroldo Tieri – Italian actor
- Mario Sábato – Argentine film director and screenwriter
- Mitchel Musso – American actor, musician, and singer
- Tracee Chimo – actress

== Arts and entertainment ==
- Alborosie – Italian-Jamaican reggae artist
- Marco Basaiti – Renaissance painter
- Michael Bellusci – Musician and Drummer
- Olivier Berggruen – German-American art historian and curator
- Bino – Italian rock percussionist and actor
- Gabriella Cilmi – Australian singer-songwriter
- Claudia Conserva – Chilean television hostess
- Drita D'Avanzo – television personality
- Kara DioGuardi – American singer-songwriter, record producer, music publisher, A&R executive, composer and TV personality
- Enzo Domestico Kabregu – Italian-Uruguayan painter and art educator
- Salvatore Frega – Italian composer of contemporary cultured music and experimental music
- Mônica Kabregu Bernasconi – Uruguayan visual artist and ceramicist
- Joe Lala – American rock percussionist and actor
- Cosimo Damiano Lanza – Italian pianist, harpsichordist and composer
- Soledad Onetto – Chilean TV presenter
- Steven Parrino – American artist and musician associated with energetic punk nihilism
- Michele Perniola – Italian singer, best known for representing San Marino at the Junior Eurovision Song Contest 2013
- Renzo Rubino – Italian pop singer songwriter
- Bobbi Starr – pornographic actress
- Tito Schipa – Italian tenor
- Tito Schipa Jr. – Portuguese-born Italian composer, singer-songwriter, producer, writer and actor
- Nik Spatari – Italian painter, sculptor, architect and art scholar
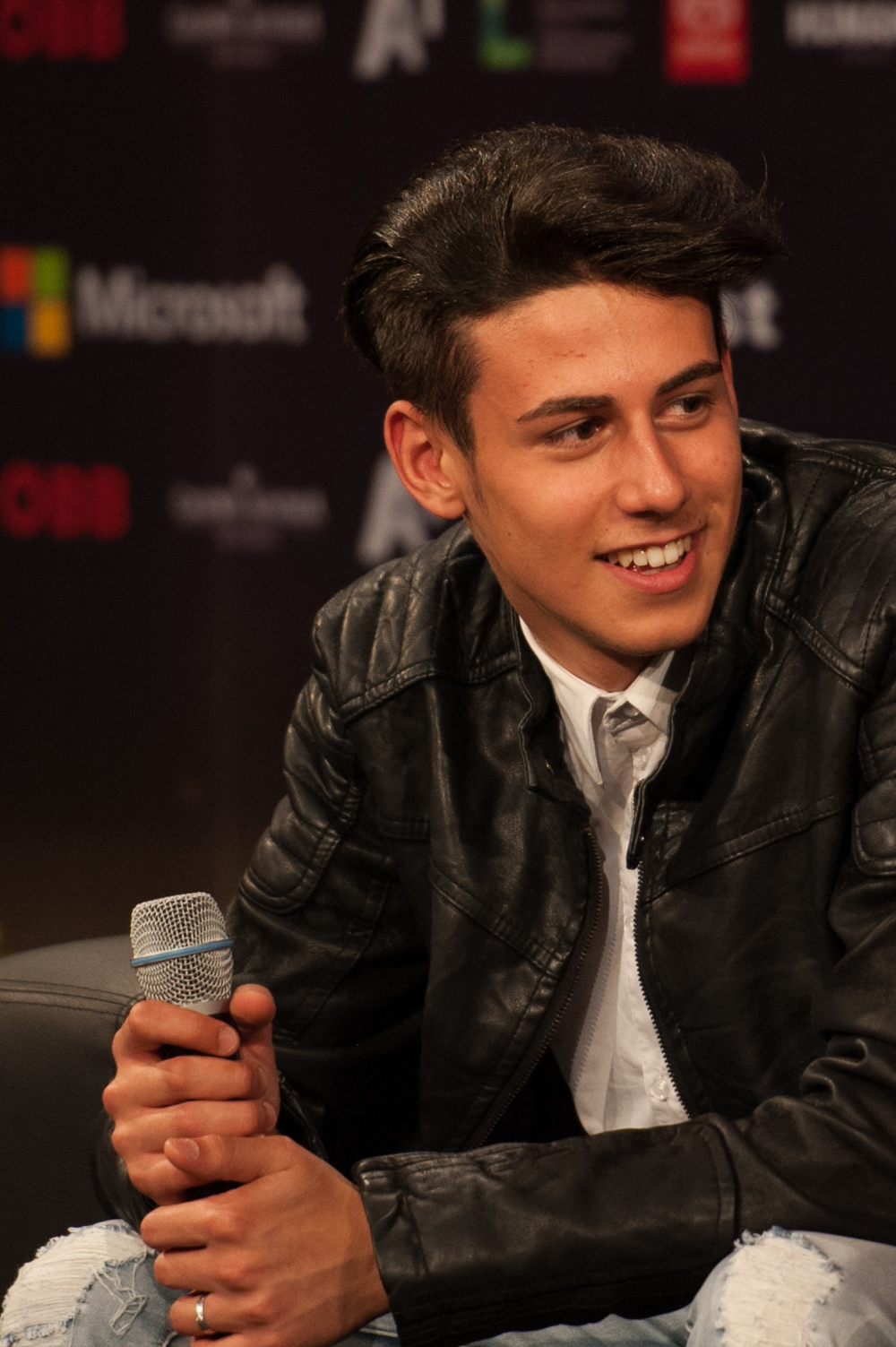
Michele Perniola

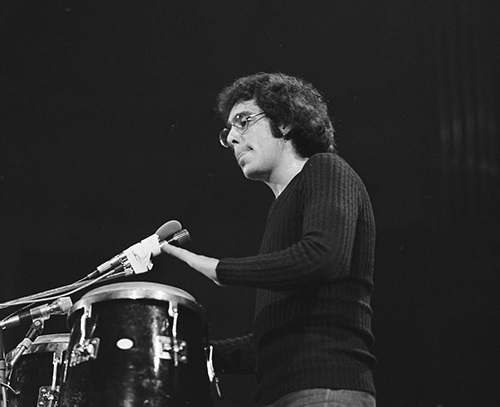
Joe Lala

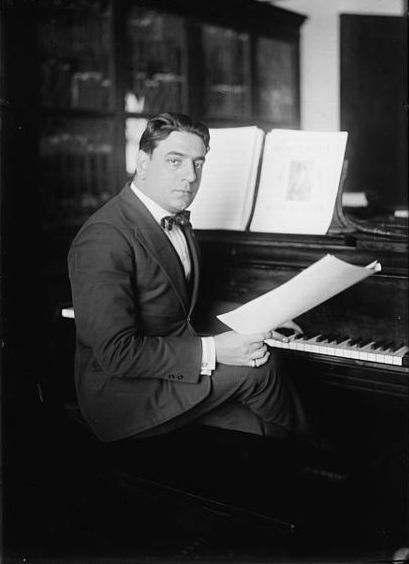
Tito Schipa

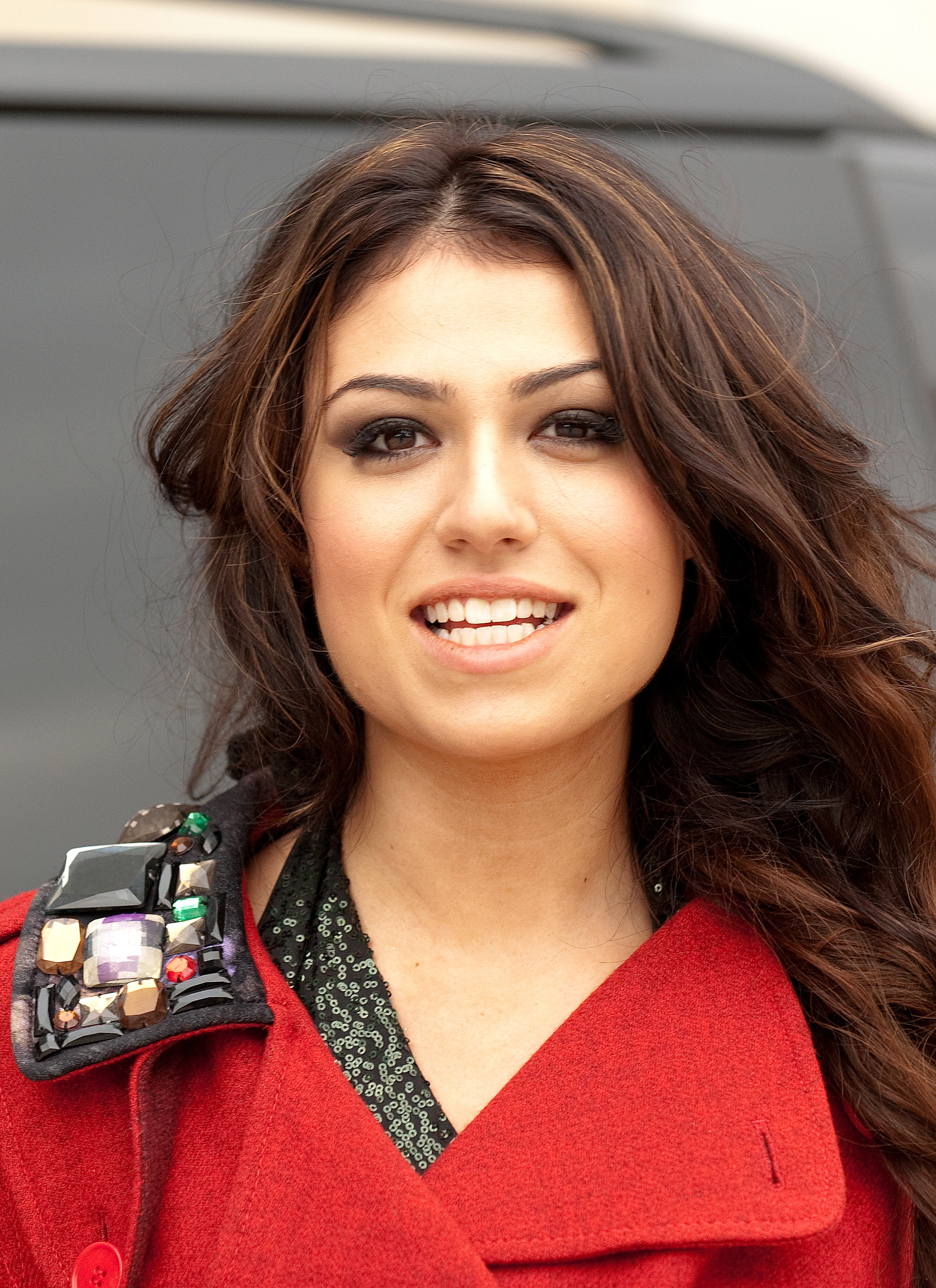
Gabriella Cilmi

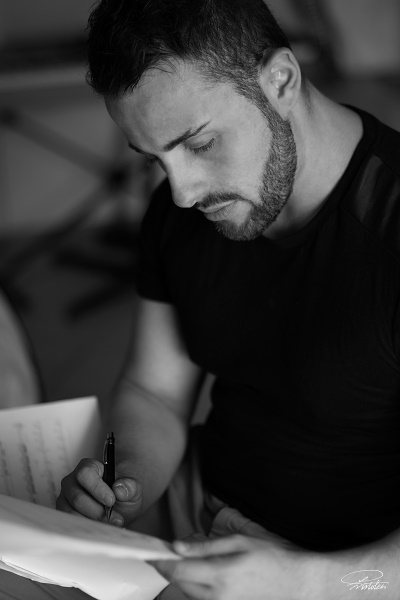
Salvatore Frega

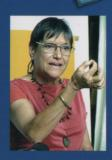
Mónica Kabregu Bernasconi

== Models ==
- Cecilia Bolocco – Chilean actress, TV Host and beauty queen who was crowned Miss Universo Chile 1987 and Miss Universe 1987
- Diana Bolocco – Chilean TV host
- Graciela Alfano – Argentine artist, model, actress and vedette
- Amalia Granata – Argentine model and politician

== Sports ==
- Tatiana Búa – Argentine tennis player
- Giuseppe Bellusci – Italian footballer
- Mateo Musacchio – Argentine footballer
- Darío Benedetto – Argentine professional footballer who plays as a striker for Boca Juniors
- Daniel Caligiuri – German professional footballer who last played as a midfielder for FC Augsburg in the Bundesliga
- Marco Caligiuri – German footballer
- Tomás Guidara – Argentine professional footballer
- Andy Varipapa – Professional trick bowler
- Antonio Candreva – Footballer
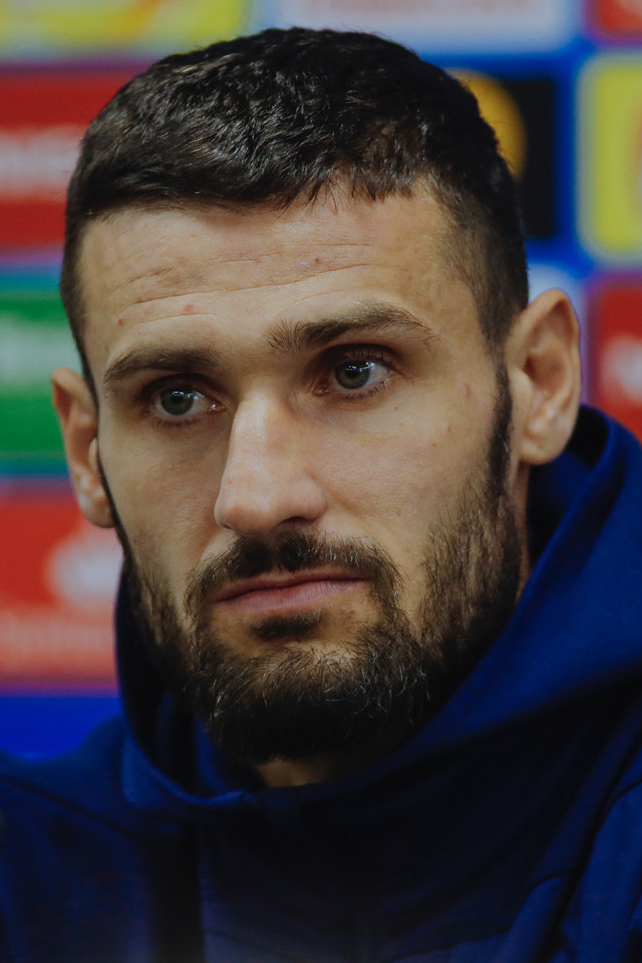
Daniel Caligiuri

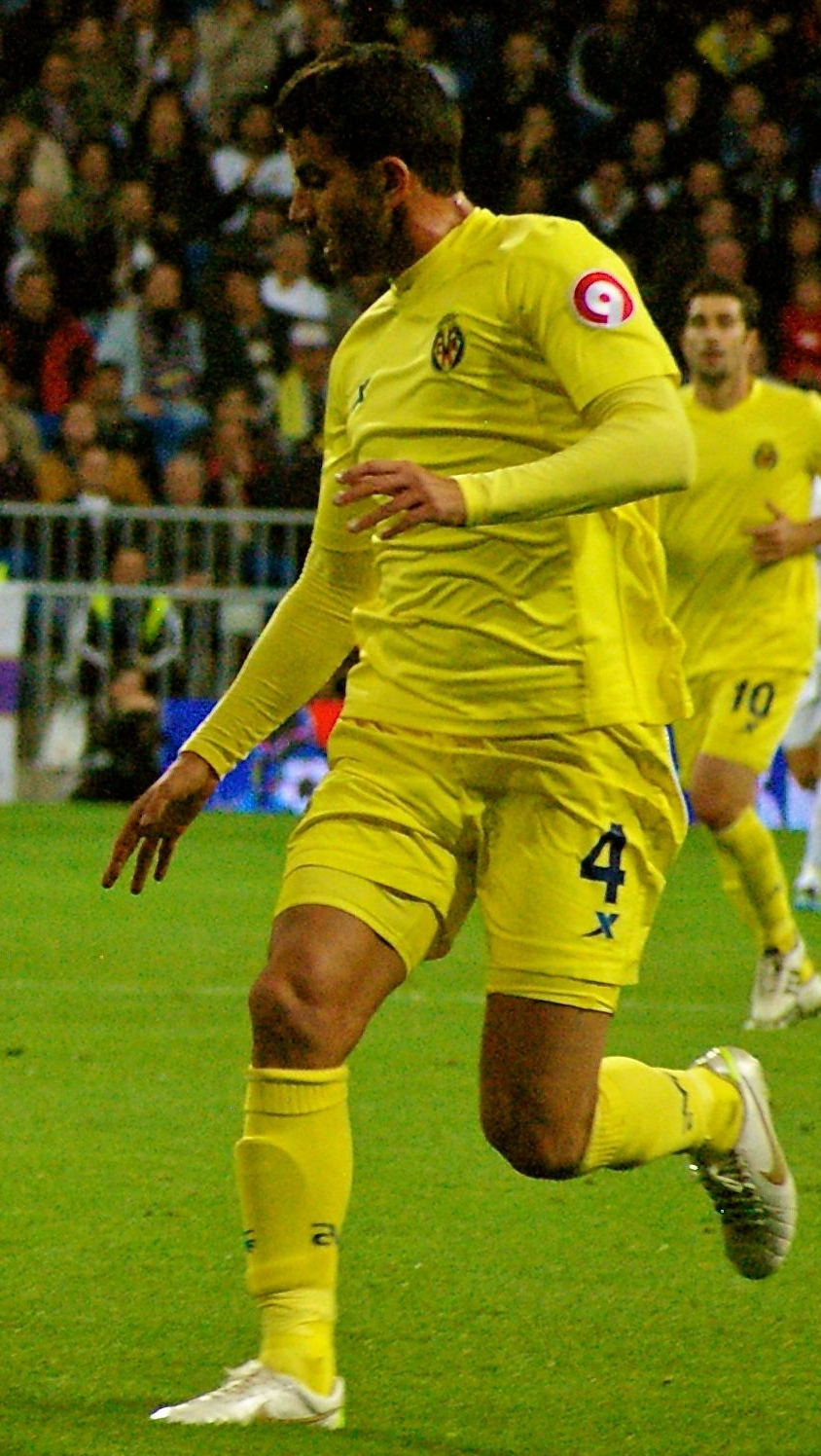
Mateo Musacchio
