= Belluzzi =

Belluzzi is a surname of Italian origin. Notable people with this surname include:

- Andrea Belluzzi (born 1968), Sammarinese politician, as a Captain Regent with Roberto Venturini
- Antonio Belluzzi (or Bellucci; 1654–1726), Italian soldier and then painter of the Rococo period
- Bernardino Belluzzi (1642–1719), Roman Catholic Bishop of Camerino and later of Montefeltro
- Giovanni Battista Belluzzi (1506–1554), also known as Il Sanmarino, Sammarinese architect
- Lodovico Belluzzi, Captain Regent of San Marino with Francesco Guidi Giangi
- Odone Belluzzi (1899–1956), Italian engineer

== See also ==
- Bellucci
- Bellizzi (surname)
