= Bellizzi (surname) =

Bellizzi is a surname. Notable people with the surname include:

- Domenico Bellizzi (1918–1989), Albanian poet
- Dominick Bellizzi (c. 1912–1934), American jockey
- Mario Bellizzi (born 1957), Italian poet

== See also ==
- Belluzzi
