= Bellusci =

Bellusci is an Italian surname. Notable people with the surname include:

- Giuseppe Bellusci (born 1989), Italian footballer
- Giuseppe Salvatore Bellusci (1888–1972), Italian politician
- Michael Bellusci (born 1960), American musician

== See also ==
- Belluschi
- Bellucci
