= Bellucci =

Bellucci is an Italian surname, derived from the adjective "bello" (beautiful), which was also used as a given name in the past. In some areas of Southern Italy, mostly in Calabria, Bellucci is also a variant of Bellusci and Belluscio, two noted Arbëreshë surnames in the Italo-Albanian community. Notable people with the surname include:

- Andrew Bellucci (1964–2023), American cook
- Antonio Bellucci (1654–1726), Italian painter
- Carlos Bellucci (1895–1953), Argentine actor
- Claudio Bellucci (born 1975), Italian football striker
- Cleto Bellucci (1921–2013), Italian Roman Catholic bishop
- Giovanni Bellucci (born 1965), Italian pianist
- Maria Teresa Bellucci (born 1972), Italian politician
- Matteo Bellucci (born 1995), Italian badminton player
- Mattia Bellucci (born 2001), Italian tennis player
- Melissa Bellucci (born 2001), Italian footballer
- Monica Bellucci (born 1964), Italian actress and former fashion model
- Niki Belucci (born Francesca Lovatelli Caetani; 1983), Hungarian DJ and pornographic actress
- Richard Bellucci (1914–2005), American inventor, surgeon and otolaryngologist
- Sandro Bellucci (born 1955), Italian racewalker
- Thomaz Bellucci (born 1987), Brazilian tennis player
- Valentino Bellucci (1975), Italian philosopher, sociologist and poet

== See also ==
- Belluschi
- Bellusci
