= Acquaformosa =

- Comune
- Comune di Acquaformosa
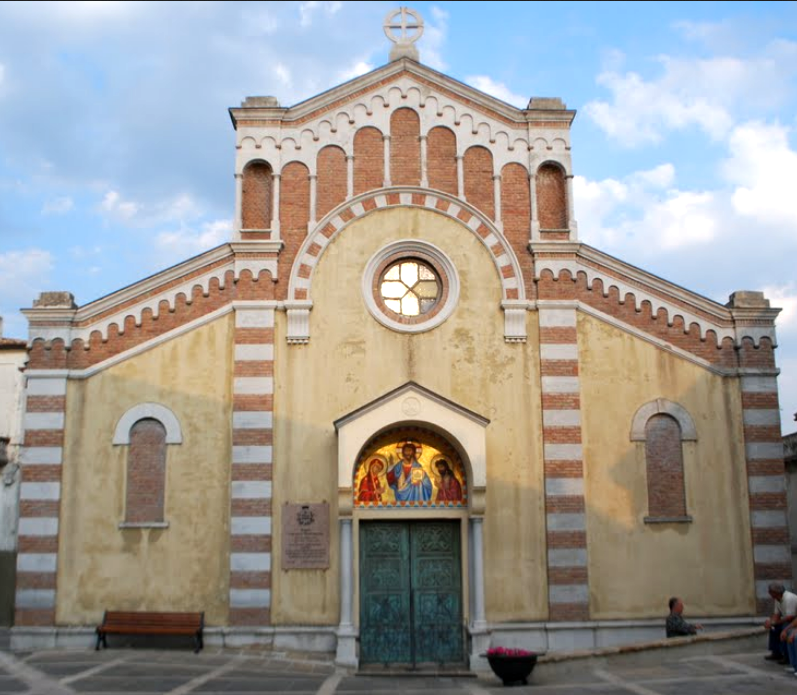

- Location of Acquaformosa in Italy Acquaformosa (Calabria)
- Coordinates: 39°43′N 16°06′E
- Country: Italy
- Region: Calabria
- Province: Cosenza (CS)

Government
  - Mayor: Annalisa Milione

Area
  - Total: 22.71 km^{2} (8.77 sq mi)
- Elevation: 756 m (2,480 ft)

Population (31 December 2016)
  - Total: 1,106
  - Density: 48.70/km^{2} (126.1/sq mi)
- Demonym: Acquaformositani
- Time zone: UTC+1 (CET)
  - Summer (DST): UTC+2 (CEST)
- Postal code: 87010
- Dialing code: 0981
- Patron saint: St. John the Baptist
- Saint day: August 29
- Website: Official website

Acquaformosa (Arbëreshë Albanian: Firmoza) is a town and comune in the province of Cosenza in the Calabria region of Italy. Since the Middle Ages it has been home to an Arbëresh minority community, which is reflected in the presence of Skanderbeg's heraldic eagle in the comune's coat of arms. The town is also the seat of the Arberesh Orthodox Church.

== History ==
The town of Acquaformosa was originally the site of the Monastery Santa Maria di Sambucina di Luzzi, founded in 1195, and populated by a handful of Catholic monks.

In 1501, 15 families totaling 22 people arrived from Albania. The families, led by Martino Capparelli, Pellegrino Capo and Giorgio Córtese, fled their home country to escape persecution from conquering Muslims from the Ottoman Empire. The Albanians sought permission to build a permanent settlement near the monastery. That permission was granted officially in 1506, in an accord that included payment of grains per head of livestock in the territory. The first child born to the settlers was in 1504.

Today, the surnames of many of the original settlers still make up a majority of the population in Acquaformosa, including Capparelli and Buono.

== Language ==
While Italian is spoken by residents of Acquaformosa, the Arbëresh language is still widely spoken by the local population. Arbëresh is derived from 15th century Albanian, as it was spoken when the original immigrants fled Albania at the beginning of the 16th century. The language has since evolved, absorbing many Italian phrases and idioms, and is distinctly different from modern Albanian.

== Notable people ==
The following are notable people from or connected to Acquaformosa:

- Enzo Domestico Kabregu, painter
- Salvatore Frascino, literary critic and academic
