= List of Albanians in South America =

This list features prominent Argentinian and Chilean people of full or partial Albanian descent, arranged by occupation.

== Politics ==
- Amalia Granata – Argentine politician and former model

== Science and academia ==
- Alfonso Roque Albanese – Pioneer of cardiac and vascular surgery in Latin America

== Literature ==
- Ernesto Sabato – Argentine novelist, essayist, painter and physicist
- Enrique Cadícamo – Argentine lyricist, poet and novelist

== Cinema ==
- Mario Sábato – Argentine film director and screenwriter
- Claudia Conserva – Chilean actress, model and television presente

== Arts and entertainment ==
- Soledad Onetto – Chilean TV presenter
- Aníbal Troilo – Argentine tango musician
- Mônica Kabregu – Uruguayan visual artist

== Fashion ==
- Cecilia Bolocco – Chilean actress, TV Host and beauty queen who was crowned Miss Universo Chile 1987 and Miss Universe 1987
- Diana Bolocco – Chilean journalist, known as sister of Cecilia Bolocco, Miss Universe 1987
- Graciela Alfano – Argentine artist, model, actress and vedette
- Camila Barraza – Beauty pageant titleholder who won Miss Universe Kosovo 2016

== Sports ==
- Mateo Musacchio – Argentine footballer
- Tomás Guidara – Argentine professional footballer
- Darío Benedetto – Argentine professional footballer who plays as a striker for Boca Juniors.
- Tatiana Búa – Argentine tennis player
- Fernando Belluschi – Argentine footballer
- Diego Albanese – former Argentine rugby union player
