= Giuseppe Albenga =

Italian engineer

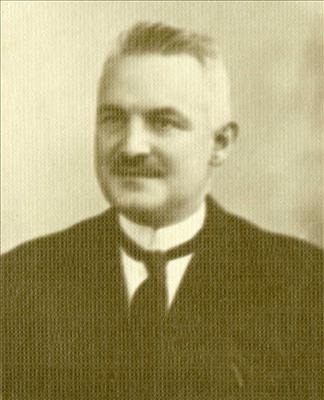
Giuseppe Albenga

Giuseppe Albenga (9 June 1882, Incisa Scapaccino – 19 January 1957, Turin) was an Italian civil engineer, professor of bridge construction, and historian of civil engineering.

== Biography ==
A student of Camillo Guidi, Giuseppe Albenga received his laurea in civil engineering at the Politecnico di Torino in 1904.

Albenga was a professor extraordinarius of road and railway construction from 1914 to 1915 at the University of Bologna and from 1915 to 1918 at the University of Pisa. From 1919 to 1928 he taught construction science at the University of Bologna.

In 1928 Albenga was appointed to the chair of bridge construction at the Politecnico di Torino, where he was the rector from 1929 to 1932.

In 1928 he was an Invited Speaker of the ICM in Bologna.

His main contributions were to the theory and practice of bridge construction and to the history of engineering — he was among the first to study the history of the development of reinforced concrete.

His students include Odone Belluzzi, Luigi Stabilini, Letterio Francesco Donato, Augusto Cavallari Murat, Giulio Pizzetti, and Riccardo Baldacci.

== Selected publications ==
- Giuseppe Albenga, Lezioni di costruzioni idrauliche. Anno 1920-21, Bologna, Sindacato Nazionale Allievi Ingegneri, 1921.
- Giuseppe Albenga, Meccanica applicata alle costruzioni, Torino, Dattilo-Litografia A. Viretto.
1. Statica dei sistemi rigidi, 1922-23.
2. Statica delle costruzioni e resistenza dei materiali, 1923-24.
- Giuseppe Albenga, Lezioni di ponti. Anno 1922-23, Torino, A. Viretto, 1922.
- Giuseppe Albenga, Lezioni di ponti, Torino, Unione tipografico-editrice torinese, 1930-1931.
1. Nozioni generali, 1930.
2. Principii della teoria dei ponti, 1930.
3. Problemi speciali, 1931.
- Giuseppe Albenga, Eligio Perucca, Dizionario tecnico industriale enciclopedico, Torino, UTET, 1937.
- Appunti di costruzioni in legno, ferro e cemento armato dalle Lezioni di Giuseppe Albenga, Torino, Ed. Corda Fratres, 1948.
- Giuseppe Albenga, I ponti, Torino, Unione Tipografico Editrice Torinese, 1953.
1. L'esperienza.
2. La teoria.
3. La pratica.
- Giuseppe Albenga, Moderni ponti stradali in acciaio, Milano, Ufficio italiano sviluppo applicazioni acciaio, 1956.
- Guido Fubini, Giuseppe Albenga, La matematica dell'ingegnere e le sue applicazioni, Bologna, Zanichelli, 1949-1954.
1. Volume primo, 1949.
2. Volume secondo, 1954.

== Bibliography of Albenga's publications ==
- Elenco delle pubblicazioni di Giuseppe Albenga, In: Atti e rassegna tecnica della Società degli ingegneri e degli architetti in Torino, n°10 - Ottobre 1952, pp. 351–352.
