= Ferruccio Baffa Trasci =

Italian bishop, theologian and philosopher

- bishop of Maximianopolis
- Installed: July 1656
- Term ended: October 1656

Personal details
- Born: Ferrante Marco Antonio Baffa Trasci; 27 August 1590 Bisignano, Calabria, Italy
- Died: 30 October 1656 (aged 66) Rome
- Buried: Proceno
- Denomination: Catholic
- Parents: Antonio Baffa Trasci (father), Elisabetta Anna Trentacapilli (mother)

Arms of Baffa-Trasci Family.

Ferruccio Baffa Trasci (27 August 1590 – 30 October 1656) was an Italian bishop, theologian and philosopher.

== Life ==
Born Ferrante Marco Antonio Baffa Trasci in one of the most noble and wealthy families of the Arbëreshë world in Bisignano, he was the son of Pietro Antonio Baffa Trasci and Elisabetta Anna Trentacapilli. After his teens he moved to Rome and Naples when, as a priest, became one of the most close confessors and confidents of Isabella della Rovere, Princesse of Bisignano, member of the Sanseverino family.

== Last years ==
After many years spent in the Castle Proceno in a voluntary exile, in 1656 he came back to Rome and was created Bishop of Maximianopolis (in partibus infidelium) by Pope Alexander VII. S.E.R. Ferruccio Baffa Trasci died in Rome the same year in the Great bubonic Plague. His bones were buried several years later in Proceno the church of S. Martin.

== Works ==
- Universam Aristotelis philosophiam
- Summa Aristotelicha
- Summa Theologica Dogmatica

== See also ==
- Catholic Church in Italy
