= Daniel Caligiuri =

German footballer (born 1988)

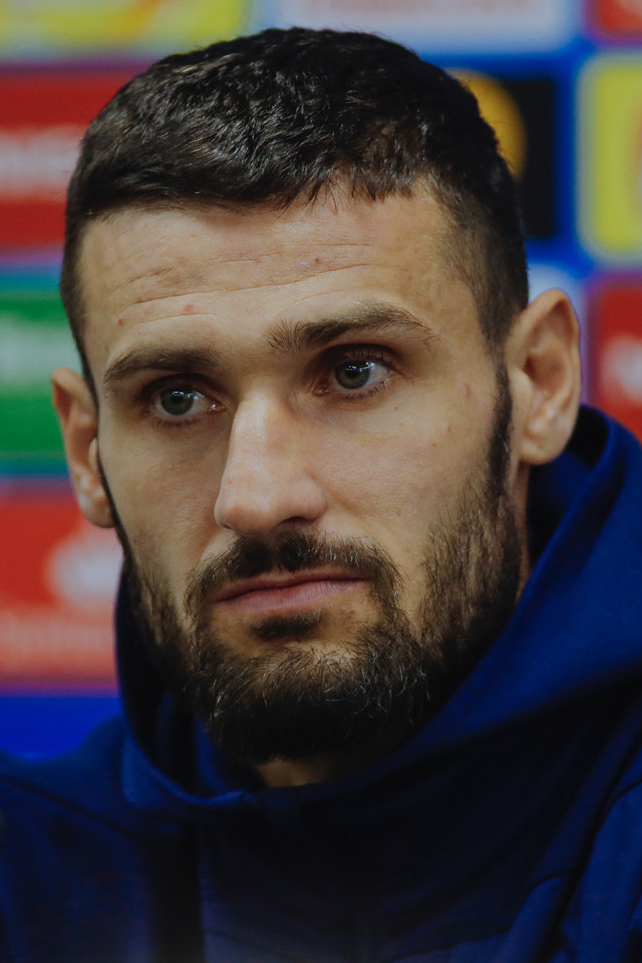
- Caligiuri with Schalke 04 in 2018

Personal information
- Date of birth: 15 January 1988 (age 38)
- Place of birth: Villingen-Schwenningen, West Germany
- Height: 1.82 m (6 ft 0 in)
- Positions: Winger; wing-back

Youth career
- 1995–2001: BSV 07 Schwenningen
- 2001–2005: SV Zimmern
- 2005–2007: SC Freiburg

Senior career*
Years	Team	Apps	(Gls)
2007–2011	SC Freiburg II	70	(23)
2009–2013	SC Freiburg	93	(11)
2013–2017	VfL Wolfsburg	97	(12)
2017–2020	Schalke 04	108	(17)
2020–2023	FC Augsburg	74	(11)
2024	FC 08 Villingen	12	(2)
Total		454	(76)
- * Club domestic league appearances and goals

Daniel Caligiuri (pronounced [kaliˈdʒuːri]; born 15 January 1988) is a former professional footballer who played as a midfielder.

== Club career ==
Born in Germany to an Italian father and a German mother, Caligiuri began his professional career with SC Freiburg. Caligiuri made his Bundesliga debut for Freiburg on 7 November 2009, starting against VfL Bochum. He joined VfL Wolfsburg in 2013 after a solid season with Freiburg. On 19 March 2015, Caligiuri scored in the second leg of the round of 16 in the Europa League against Inter Milan.

On 30 May 2015, he played as Wolfsburg won the German Cup for the first time defeating Borussia Dortmund 3–1 at the Olympic Stadium, Berlin.

On 25 January 2017, Caligiuri was announced as joining Bundesliga rivals Schalke 04 on a three-and-a-half-year deal.

On 29 June 2020, Caligiuri joined FC Augsburg on a free transfer at the end of the 2019–20 season. He signed a three-year contract.

On 2 February 2025, Caligiuri announced his retirement from professional football.

== International career ==
Caligiuri was eligible to represent both Germany through being born there (and to a German mother), as well as Italy through having an Italian father. On 22 May 2015, Caligiuri expressed his desire to play for the country of his father's heritage, stating "I have always said that I will play for the national team which invites me first. And I have big hopes now to be part of the Italy squad."

On 31 May 2015, it was announced that Antonio Conte named Caligiuri alongside fellow débutant Nicola Sansone in his preliminary squad for the upcoming UEFA Euro 2016 qualifying match against Croatia, but he was dropped from the squad on 6 June.

== Personal life ==
Caligiuri is of Italian Arbereshë descent. His older brother Marco is a former professional footballer, who last played for Greuther Fürth.

== Career statistics ==
Appearances and goals by club, season and competition
Club	Season	League			Cup		Europe		Other		Total	
Club	Season	Division	Apps	Goals	Apps	Goals	Apps	Goals	Apps	Goals	Apps	Goals
SC Freiburg II	2006–07	Oberliga	3	0	—		—		—		3	0
SC Freiburg II	2007–08	Oberliga	13	2	—		—		—		13	2
SC Freiburg II	2008–09	Regionalliga	32	7	—		—		—		32	7
SC Freiburg II	2009–10	Regionalliga	19	13	—		—		—		19	13
SC Freiburg II	2010–11	Regionalliga	1	0	—		—		—		1	0
SC Freiburg II	2011–12	Regionalliga	2	1	—		—		—		2	1
SC Freiburg II	Total		70	23	—		—		—		70	23
SC Freiburg	2009–10	Bundesliga	16	0	0	0	—		—		16	0
SC Freiburg	2010–11	Bundesliga	23	0	2	0	—		—		25	0
SC Freiburg	2011–12	Bundesliga	25	6	1	0	—		—		26	6
SC Freiburg	2012–13	Bundesliga	29	5	4	3	—		—		33	8
SC Freiburg	Total		93	11	7	3	—		—		100	14
VfL Wolfsburg	2013–14	Bundesliga	24	1	3	0	—		—		27	1
VfL Wolfsburg	2014–15	Bundesliga	28	7	6	2	11 (Note: Appearances in UEFA Europa League)	1	—		45	10
VfL Wolfsburg	2015–16	Bundesliga	29	2	2	0	8 (Note: Appearances in UEFA Champions League)	1	1 (Note: Appearance in DFL-Supercup)	0	40	3
VfL Wolfsburg	2016–17	Bundesliga	16	2	2	0	—		—		18	2
VfL Wolfsburg	Total		97	12	13	2	19	2	1	0	130	16
Schalke 04	2016–17	Bundesliga	16	2	2	1	5	1	—		23	4
Schalke 04	2017–18	Bundesliga	33	6	4	0	—		—		37	6
Schalke 04	2018–19	Bundesliga	31	7	3	0	6	0	—		40	7
Schalke 04	2019–20	Bundesliga	28	2	2	2	—		—		30	4
Schalke 04	Total		108	17	11	3	11	1	—		130	21
FC Augsburg	2020–21	Bundesliga	33	6	2	1	—		—		35	7
FC Augsburg	2021–22	Bundesliga	28	4	1	0	—		—		29	4
FC Augsburg	2022–23	Bundesliga	13	1	2	0	—		—		15	1
FC Augsburg	Total		74	11	5	1	—		—		79	12
FC 08 Villingen	2023–24	Oberliga	12	2	3	0	—		—		15	2
Career total			454	76	39	9	30	3	1	0	524	88

== Honours ==
SC Freiburg

- A-Junioren Bundesliga (South/Southwest): 2005–06
- German Under-19 Cup: 2005–06

VfL Wolfsburg

- DFB-Pokal: 2014–15
- DFL-Supercup: 2015
