= 2020–21 FC Augsburg season =

FC Augsburg
2020–21 season
- Chairman: Klaus Hofmann
- Head coach: Heiko Herrlich (until 26 April 2021); Markus Weinzierl (from 26 April 2021)
- Stadium: WWK Arena
- Bundesliga: 13th
- DFB-Pokal: Second round
- Top goalscorer: League: André Hahn (8); All: André Hahn (9)
Home colours	Away colours	Third colours

The 2020–21 season was the 114th season in the existence of FC Augsburg and the club's 10th consecutive season in the top flight of German football. In addition to the domestic league, FC Augsburg participated in this season's edition of the DFB-Pokal. The season covered the period from 1 July 2020 to 30 June 2021.

== Players ==
=== Current squad ===
As of 1 February 2021

Note: Flags indicate national team as defined under FIFA eligibility rules; some limited exceptions apply. Players may hold more than one non-FIFA nationality.

No.	Pos.	Nation	Player
1	GK	POL	Rafał Gikiewicz
2	DF	POL	Robert Gumny
3	DF	DEN	Mads Valentin
5	DF	CZE	Marek Suchý
6	DF	NED	Jeffrey Gouweleeuw
7	FW	GER	Florian Niederlechner
8	MF	GER	Rani Khedira
11	FW	AUT	Michael Gregoritsch
14	MF	CZE	Jan Morávek
16	MF	SUI	Ruben Vargas
17	MF	NGR	Noah Sarenren Bazee
18	MF	SVK	László Bénes (on loan from Borussia Mönchengladbach)
19	DF	GER	Felix Uduokhai

No.	Pos.	Nation	Player
20	MF	GER	Daniel Caligiuri
22	DF	BRA	Iago
23	MF	GER	Marco Richter
24	MF	FIN	Fredrik Jensen
25	MF	ECU	Carlos Gruezo
27	FW	ISL	Alfreð Finnbogason
28	MF	GER	André Hahn
32	DF	GER	Raphael Framberger
33	MF	GER	Tobias Strobl
36	MF	ENG	Reece Oxford
39	GK	GER	Benjamin Leneis
40	GK	CZE	Tomáš Koubek

=== Players out on loan ===
Note: Flags indicate national team as defined under FIFA eligibility rules; some limited exceptions apply. Players may hold more than one non-FIFA nationality.

No.	Pos.	Nation	Player
—	FW	VEN	Sergio Córdova (on loan at Arminia Bielefeld until 30 June 2021.)
—	DF	AUT	Kevin Danso (on loan at Fortuna Düsseldorf until 30 June 2021.)
—	DF	GER	Felix Götze (on loan at 1. FC Kaiserslautern until 30 June 2021.)
—	FW	GER	Maurice Malone (on loan at Wehen Wiesbaden until 30 June 2021.)
—	DF	CRO	Jozo Stanić (on loan at FSV Zwickau until 30 June 2021.)
—	DF	DEN	Frederik Winther (on loan at Lyngby until 30 June 2021.)

== Transfers ==
=== In ===
No.	Pos	Player	Transferred from	Fee	Date	Source
19	DF	(Germany) Felix Uduokhai	(Germany) VfL Wolfsburg	€7,000,000	1 July 2020	
20	MF	(Germany) Daniel Caligiuri	(Germany) Schalke 04	Free	1 July 2020	
1	GK	(Poland) Rafał Gikiewicz	(Germany) Union Berlin	Free	1 July 2020	
33	MF	(Germany) Tobias Strobl	(Germany) Borussia Mönchengladbach	Free	1 July 2020	
2	DF	(Poland) Robert Gumny	(Poland) Lech Poznań	€2,000,000	2 September 2020	
	DF	(Denmark) Frederik Winther	(Denmark) Lyngby	€1,300,000	5 October 2020	
18	MF	(Slovakia) László Bénes	(Germany) Borussia Mönchengladbach	Loan	1 February 2021	

=== Out ===
No.	Pos	Player	Transferred to	Fee	Date	Source
2	DF	(Switzerland) Stephan Lichtsteiner		Free	1 July 2020	
10	MF	(Germany) Daniel Baier		Free	23 July 2020	
1	GK	(Germany) Andreas Luthe	(Germany) Union Berlin	Free	3 August 2020	
13	GK	(Germany) Fabian Giefer	(Germany) Würzburger Kickers	Undisclosed	3 August 2020	
37	FW	(Germany) Maurice Malone	(Germany) Wehen Wiesbaden	Loan	15 August 2020	
9	FW	(Venezuela) Sergio Córdova	(Germany) Arminia Bielefeld	Loan	17 August 2020	
38	DF	(Austria) Kevin Danso	(Germany) Fortuna Düsseldorf	Loan	18 August 2020	
40	DF	(Germany) Tim Rieder	(Germany) 1. FC Kaiserslautern	Undisclosed	21 August 2020	
15	DF	(Croatia) Jozo Stanić	(Germany) FSV Zwickau	Loan	22 August 2020	
31	DF	(Germany) Philipp Max	(Netherlands) PSV	€8,000,000	2 September 2020	
34	MF	(Austria) Georg Teigl	FK Austria Wien	Undisclosed	7 September 2020	
	DF	(Denmark) Frederik Winther	(Denmark) Lyngby	Loan	5 October 2020	
26	DF	(Germany) Simon Asta	(Germany) Greuther Fürth	Undisclosed	5 October 2020	
29	MF	(Germany) Eduard Löwen	(Germany) Hertha BSC	Loan termination	5 October 2020	
4	DF	(Germany) Felix Götze	(Germany) 1. FC Kaiserslautern	Loan	1 February 2021	

== Pre-season and friendlies ==
Win Draw Loss

5 September 2020 Friendly	Ajax	1–0	FC Augsburg	Duivendrecht, Netherlands
14:00 CEST (UTC+2)	Labyad 19' (pen.)		Gouweleeuw (yellow card) 67'	Stadium: Sportpark De Toekomst

9 October 2020 Friendly	1. FC Heidenheim	1–1	FC Augsburg	Heidenheim, Germany
14:30 CEST (UTC+2)	Theuerkauf 34'	Report	Suchý 8'	Stadium: Voith-Arena; Attendance: 331; Referee: Martin Petersen

4 January 2021 Friendly	FC Augsburg	1–0	Jahn Regensburg	Augsburg, Germany
15:00 CET (UTC+1)	Hahn 9'	Report	Gimber (yellow card) 59'	Stadium: WWK Arena; Attendance: 0

15 February 2021 Friendly	FC Augsburg	3–1	Würzburger Kickers	Augsburg, Germany
14:00 CET (UTC+1)	Vargas 19'; Sarenren Bazee 33'; Douglas 70' (o.g.)	Report	David 2'	Stadium: WWK Arena; Attendance: 0 Referee: Michael Bacher

26 March 2021 Friendly	FC Augsburg	3–1	1. FC Heidenheim	Augsburg, Germany
14:00 CET (UTC+1)	Bénes 31'; Hahn 36', 47'	Report	Leipertz 5'	Stadium: WWK Arena; Attendance: 0 Referee: Robert Hartmann

== Competitions ==
=== Overview ===
Competition	First match	Last match	Starting round	Final position	Record							
Competition	First match	Last match	Starting round	Final position	Pld	W	D	L	GF	GA	GD	Win %
Bundesliga	19 September 2020	22 May 2021	Matchday 1	13th	34	10	6	18	36	54	−18	29.41
DFB-Pokal	12 September 2020	22 December 2020	First round	Second round	2	1	0	1	7	3	+4	50.00
Total					36	11	6	19	43	57	−14	30.56

Source: Soccerway

=== Bundesliga ===
==== League table ====
Pos	Team	Pld	W	D	L	GF	GA	GD	Pts
11	1899 Hoffenheim	34	11	10	13	52	54	−2	43
12	Mainz 05	34	10	9	15	39	56	−17	39
13	FC Augsburg	34	10	6	18	36	54	−18	36
14	Hertha BSC	34	8	11	15	41	52	−11	35
15	Arminia Bielefeld	34	9	8	17	26	52	−26	35

Source: DFB
Rules for classification: 1) Points; 2) Goal difference; 3) Goals scored; 4) Head-to-head results; 5) Head-to-head away goals scored; 6) Away goals scored; 7) Play-off.

==== Results summary ====
Overall								Home						Away					
Pld	W	D	L	GF	GA	GD	Pts	W	D	L	GF	GA	GD	W	D	L	GF	GA	GD
34	10	6	18	36	54	−18	36	6	4	7	21	25	−4	4	2	11	15	29	−14

Source: DFB

==== Results by round ====
Round	1	2	3	4	5	6	7	8	9	10	11	12	13	14	15	16	17	18	19	20	21	22	23	24	25	26	27	28	29	30	31	32	33	34
Ground	A	H	A	H	A	H	H	A	H	A	H	A	H	A	H	A	H	H	A	H	A	H	A	A	H	A	H	A	H	A	H	A	H	A
Result	W	W	D	L	L	W	L	D	D	L	D	W	L	W	L	L	L	W	L	L	L	D	W	L	W	L	W	L	D	L	L	L	W	L
Position	4	2	2	6	11	6	10	10	8	11	10	9	11	10	11	11	12	12	13	13	13	13	13	13	13	13	11	11	11	12	13	14	13	13

Source: DFB
A = Away; H = Home; W = Win; D = Draw; L = Loss

==== Matches ====
The league fixtures were announced on 7 August 2020.

19 September 2020 1	Union Berlin	1–3	FC Augsburg	Berlin
15:30 CEST (UTC+2)	Trimmel (yellow card) 9'; Griesbeck (yellow card) 62'; Bülter 75'	Report	Vargas 41'; Gregoritsch 82'; Hahn 89'	Stadium: Stadion An der Alten Försterei; Attendance: 4,600; Referee: Marco Fritz

26 September 2020 2	FC Augsburg	2–0	Borussia Dortmund	Augsburg
15:30 CEST (UTC+2)	Gregoritsch (yellow card) 29'; Khedira (yellow card) 30'; Gouweleeuw (yellow card) 31'; Uduokhai 40'; Caligiuri 54'	Report	Haaland (yellow card) 30'; Meunier (yellow card) 38'; Witsel (yellow card) 71'; Can (yellow card) 76'	Stadium: WWK Arena; Attendance: 6,000; Referee: Martin Petersen

4 October 2020 3	VfL Wolfsburg	0–0	FC Augsburg	Wolfsburg
15:30 CEST (UTC+2)		Report	Gouweleeuw (yellow card) 90+4'	Stadium: Volkswagen Arena; Attendance: 4,632; Referee: Felix Zwayer

17 October 2020 4	FC Augsburg	0–2	RB Leipzig	Augsburg
15:30 CEST (UTC+2)		Report	Angeliño 45'; Upamecano (yellow card) 60'; Poulsen 66'	Stadium: WWK Arena; Attendance: 0 Referee: Felix Brych

26 October 2020 5	Bayer Leverkusen	3–1	FC Augsburg	Leverkusen
20:30 CET (UTC+1)	Alario 16' (pen.), 74', (yellow card) 78'; Diaby 90+4'	Report	Framberger (yellow card) 15'; Caligiuri 51'; Vargas (yellow card) 77'	Stadium: BayArena; Attendance: 0 Referee: Sören Storks

31 October 2020 6	FC Augsburg	3–1	Mainz 05	Augsburg
15:30 CET (UTC+1)	Vargas 40', (yellow card) 49'; Strobl (yellow card) 58'; Iago (yellow card) 66'; Hahn 80', 90+1', (yellow card) 90+2'; Sarenren Bazee (yellow card) 85'	Report	Onisiwo 64'; St. Juste (yellow card) 84'	Stadium: WWK Arena; Attendance: 0 Referee: Marco Fritz

7 November 2020 7	FC Augsburg	0–3	Hertha BSC	Augsburg
15:30 CET (UTC+1)	Caligiuri (yellow card) 18'; Gouweleeuw (yellow card) 38'; Gruezo (yellow card) 67'	Report	Cunha 44' (pen.); Lukebakio 52'; Piątek 86'	Stadium: WWK Arena; Attendance: 0 Referee: Frank Willenborg

21 November 2020 8	Borussia Mönchengladbach	1–1	FC Augsburg	Mönchengladbach
15:30 CET (UTC+1)	Neuhaus 5'; Thuram (yellow card) 90+2'	Report	Khedira (yellow card) 38'; Framberger (yellow card) 62' (yellow-red card) 66'; Gouweleeuw (yellow card) 65'; Caligiuri 88'	Stadium: Borussia-Park; Attendance: 0 Referee: Markus Schmidt

28 November 2020 9	FC Augsburg	1–1	SC Freiburg	Augsburg
15:30 CET (UTC+1)	Caligiuri (yellow card) 20'; Gumny (yellow card) 24'; Uduokhai (yellow card) 67'; Vargas 80'	Report	Demirović (yellow card) 7'; Grifo 64'	Stadium: WWK Arena; Attendance: 0 Referee: Robert Schröder

7 December 2020 10	1899 Hoffenheim	3–1	FC Augsburg	Sinsheim
20:30 CET (UTC+1)	Grillitsch 17', 46'; Bebou 50'	Report	Caligiuri 31'; Gumny (yellow card) 74'	Stadium: Rhein-Neckar-Arena; Attendance: 0 Referee: Florian Badstübner

13 December 2020 11	FC Augsburg	2–2	Schalke 04	Augsburg
15:30 CET (UTC+1)	Serdar 32' (o.g.); Niederlechner (yellow card) 45+4' (yellow-red card) 53'; Khedira (yellow card) 77'; Richter 90+3'	Report	Sané (yellow card) 45+5'; Raman 52'; Boujellab 62'; Kabak (yellow card) 64'; Fährmann (yellow card) 81'; Skrzybski (yellow card) 90'	Stadium: WWK Arena; Attendance: 0 Referee: Manuel Gräfe

16 December 2020 12	Arminia Bielefeld	0–1	FC Augsburg	Bielefeld
20:30 CET (UTC+1)	Kunze (yellow card) 19'	Report	Framberger (yellow card) 45+1'; Gruezo (yellow card) 80'; Gouweleeuw 85'	Stadium: Bielefelder Alm; Attendance: 0 Referee: Patrick Ittrich

19 December 2020 13	FC Augsburg	0–2	Eintracht Frankfurt	Augsburg
15:30 CET (UTC+1)	Caligiuri (yellow card) 89'	Report	Sow (yellow card) 30'; Framberger 53' (o.g.); Barkok (yellow card) 56'; Rode (yellow card) 67'; Hinteregger (yellow card) 72'; Ilsanker 87'	Stadium: WWK Arena; Attendance: 0 Referee: Daniel Siebert

2 January 2021 14	1. FC Köln	0–1	FC Augsburg	Cologne
15:30 CET (UTC+1)	Modeste (yellow card) 64'; Bornauw (yellow card) 74'	Report	Uduokhai (yellow card) 12'; Gouweleeuw (yellow card) 64'; Iago 77'; Richter (yellow card) 85'	Stadium: RheinEnergieStadion; Attendance: 0 Referee: Sören Storks

10 January 2021 15	FC Augsburg	1–4	VfB Stuttgart	Augsburg
15:30 CET (UTC+1)	Gruezo (yellow card) 23'; Richter 46', (yellow card) 73' (yellow-red card) 76'	Report	González 10' (pen.); Silas 29'; Anton (yellow card) 32'; Endo (yellow card) 50'; Castro 61'; Didavi 87'	Stadium: WWK Arena; Attendance: 0 Referee: Daniel Schlager

16 January 2021 16	Werder Bremen	2–0	FC Augsburg	Bremen
15:30 CET (UTC+1)	Gebre Selassie 84'; Agu 87'	Report	Caligiuri (yellow card) 32'	Stadium: Weser-Stadion; Attendance: 0 Referee: Sascha Stegemann

20 January 2021 17	FC Augsburg	0–1	Bayern Munich	Augsburg
20:30 CET (UTC+1)	Khedira (yellow card) 15'; Uduokhai (yellow card) 62'; Finnbogason (penalty missed) 76'	Report	Lewandowski 13' (pen.)	Stadium: WWK Arena; Attendance: 0 Referee: Matthias Jöllenbeck

23 January 2021 18	FC Augsburg	2–1	Union Berlin	Augsburg
15:30 CET (UTC+1)	Niederlechner 17', 47', (yellow card) 55'; Strobl (yellow card) 45'; Oxford (yellow card) 49'	Report	Ingvartsen 25', (penalty missed) 56'; Trimmel (yellow card) 67'	Stadium: WWK Arena; Attendance: 0 Referee: Felix Brych

30 January 2021 19	Borussia Dortmund	3–1	FC Augsburg	Dortmund
15:30 CET (UTC+1)	Haaland (penalty missed) 21'; Delaney 26'; Sancho 63'; Uduokhai 75' (o.g.)	Report	Hahn 10'; Iago (yellow card) 20'	Stadium: Signal Iduna Park; Attendance: 0 Referee: Patrick Ittrich

6 February 2021 20	FC Augsburg	0–2	VfL Wolfsburg	Augsburg
15:30 CET (UTC+1)	Bénes (yellow card) 40'; Gumny (yellow card) 52'	Report	Weghorst 38'; Baku 59'	Stadium: WWK Arena; Attendance: 0 Referee: Robert Hartmann

12 February 2021 21	RB Leipzig	2–1	FC Augsburg	Leipzig
20:30 CET (UTC+1)	Olmo 38' (pen.); Klostermann (yellow card) 41'; Nkunku 43'; Orbán (yellow card) 62'; Adams (yellow card) 72'	Report	Oxford (yellow card) 3'; Gouweleeuw (yellow card) 22'; Suchý (yellow card) 28'; Gikiewicz (yellow card) 34'; Bénes (yellow card) 63'; Caligiuri 77' (pen.)	Stadium: Red Bull Arena; Attendance: 0 Referee: Felix Zwayer

21 February 2021 22	FC Augsburg	1–1	Bayer Leverkusen	Augsburg
13:30 CET (UTC+1)	Niederlechner 5', (yellow card) 59'; Bénes (yellow card) 49'	Report	Tapsoba (yellow card) 32', (goal) 90+5'; Aránguiz (yellow card) 39'; Diaby (yellow card) 88'; Fosu-Mensah (yellow card) 89'	Stadium: WWK Arena; Attendance: 0 Referee: Christian Dingert

28 February 2021 23	Mainz 05	0–1	FC Augsburg	Mainz
15:30 CET (UTC+1)	Latza (yellow card) 44'	Report	Hahn 25'; Framberger (yellow card) 45'; Strobl (yellow card) 76'	Stadium: Opel Arena; Attendance: 0 Referee: Daniel Schlager

6 March 2021 24	Hertha BSC	2–1	FC Augsburg	Berlin
15:30 CET (UTC+1)	Stark (yellow card) 45+2'; Piątek 62'; Lukebakio (yellow card) 72', (goal) 89' (pen.)	Report	Bénes 2'; Hahn (yellow card) 26'; Valentin (yellow card) 49'; Gouweleeuw (yellow card) 80'	Stadium: Olympiastadion; Attendance: 0 Referee: Florian Badstübner

12 March 2021 25	FC Augsburg	3–1	Borussia Mönchengladbach	Augsburg
20:30 CET (UTC+1)	Vargas 52'; Richter 76'; Hahn 89'	Report	Stindl (penalty missed) 38'; Neuhaus 68'	Stadium: WWK Arena; Attendance: 0 Referee: Sven Jablonski

21 March 2021 26	SC Freiburg	2–0	FC Augsburg	Freiburg
18:00 CET (UTC+1)	Lienhart (yellow card) 23', (goal) 79'; Gulde (yellow card) 29'; Santamaria (yellow card) 45+1'; Til (yellow card) 46'; Sallai 51'; Höfler (yellow card) 74'; Günter (yellow card) 76'; Demirović (yellow card) 90+4'	Report	Uduokhai (yellow card) 15'; Gouweleeuw (yellow card) 84'	Stadium: Schwarzwald-Stadion; Attendance: 0 Referee: Bastian Dankert

3 April 2021 27	FC Augsburg	2–1	1899 Hoffenheim	Augsburg
15:30 CEST (UTC+2)	Vargas 8'; Hahn 23', (yellow card) 90+1'	Report	Samassékou (yellow card) 37'; Skov 86'	Stadium: WWK Arena; Attendance: 0 Referee: Guido Winkmann

11 April 2021 28	Schalke 04	1–0	FC Augsburg	Gelsenkirchen
15:30 CEST (UTC+2)	Serdar 4'	Report	Gouweleeuw (yellow card) 35'; Framberger (yellow card) 74'	Stadium: Veltins-Arena; Attendance: 0 Referee: Harm Osmers

17 April 2021 29	FC Augsburg	0–0	Arminia Bielefeld	Augsburg
15:30 CEST (UTC+2)	Strobl (yellow card) 27'; Khedira (yellow card) 44'; Caligiuri (yellow card) 83'; Gikiewicz (yellow card) 90+1'	Report	Schipplock (yellow card) 90+1'	Stadium: WWK Arena; Attendance: 0 Referee: Markus Schmidt

20 April 2021 30	Eintracht Frankfurt	2–0	FC Augsburg	Frankfurt
20:30 CEST (UTC+2)	Hinteregger (yellow card) 31', (goal) 37'; Jović (yellow card) 51'; Silva 58'; Rode (yellow card) 84'	Report	Uduokhai (yellow card) 46'; Finnbogason (penalty missed) 73'	Stadium: Deutsche Bank Park; Attendance: 0 Referee: Robert Schröder

23 April 2021 31	FC Augsburg	2–3	1. FC Köln	Augsburg
20:30 CEST (UTC+2)	Gumny (yellow card) 45+2', (goal) 54'; Gruezo (yellow card) 52'; Vargas 62'	Report	Duda 8', 33', (yellow card) 90'; Kainz 23'; Wolf (yellow card) 45'; Rexhbeçaj (yellow card) 80'	Stadium: WWK Arena; Attendance: 0 Referee: Martin Petersen

7 May 2021 32	VfB Stuttgart	2–1	FC Augsburg	Stuttgart
20:30 CEST (UTC+2)	Förster 11'; Kalajdžić 74'	Report	Niederlechner 59'	Stadium: Mercedes-Benz Arena; Attendance: 0 Referee: Manuel Gräfe

15 May 2021 33	FC Augsburg	2–0	Werder Bremen	Augsburg
15:30 CEST (UTC+2)	Vargas (red card) 13'; Gikiewicz (yellow card) 45+1'; Khedira 57'; Richter (yellow card) 65'; Caligiuri 90' (pen.); Hahn (yellow card) 90+2'	Report	Groß (yellow card) 42' (yellow-red card) 49'; Moisander (yellow card) 90+2'	Stadium: WWK Arena; Attendance: 0 Referee: Robert Schröder

22 May 2021 34	Bayern Munich	5–2	FC Augsburg	Munich
15:30 CEST (UTC+2)	Gouweleeuw 9' (o.g.); Gnabry 23'; Kimmich 33'; Coman 43'; Hernandez (yellow card) 83'; Lewandowski 90'	Report	Caligiuri (penalty missed) 25'; Hahn 67'; Suchý (yellow card) 69'; Niederlechner 72'	Stadium: Allianz Arena; Attendance: 250; Referee: Markus Schmidt

=== DFB-Pokal ===
12 September 2020 First round	Eintracht Celle	0–7	FC Augsburg	Augsburg
15:30 CEST (UTC+2)	Kaplan (yellow card) 40'	Report	Vargas 20'; Caligiuri 29'; Gouweleeuw (yellow card) 37'; Finnbogason 47' (pen.); Niederlechner 57'; Hahn 66'; Jensen 88', 90'	Stadium: WWK Arena; Attendance: 0 Referee: Daniel Schlager

22 December 2020 Second round	FC Augsburg	0–3	RB Leipzig	Augsburg
18:30 CET (UTC+1)	Iago (yellow card) 8'	Report	Orbán 11'; Mukiele (yellow card) 73'; Poulsen 75'; Angeliño 82'	Stadium: WWK Arena; Referee: Sascha Stegemann

== Statistics ==
=== Appearances and goals ===
No.	Pos	Nat	Player	Total		Bundesliga		DFB-Pokal	
No.	Pos	Nat	Player	Apps	Goals	Apps	Goals	Apps	Goals
Goalkeepers
1	GK	(Poland) POL	Rafał Gikiewicz	36	0	34	0	2	0
39	GK	(Germany) GER	Benjamin Leneis	0	0	0	0	0	0
40	GK	(Czech Republic) CZE	Tomáš Koubek	0	0	0	0	0	0
Defenders
2	DF	(Poland) POL	Robert Gumny	26	1	14+10	1	1+1	0
3	DF	(Denmark) DEN	Mads Valentin	15	0	9+6	0	0	0
5	DF	(Czech Republic) CZE	Marek Suchý	5	0	3+2	0	0	0
6	DF	(Netherlands) NED	Jeffrey Gouweleeuw	34	1	32	1	2	0
19	DF	(Germany) GER	Felix Uduokhai	31	1	29	1	2	0
22	DF	(Brazil) BRA	Iago	20	1	18	1	2	0
32	DF	(Germany) GER	Raphael Framberger	22	0	19+2	0	1	0
Midfielders
8	MF	(Germany) GER	Rani Khedira	29	1	24+3	1	2	0
14	MF	(Czech Republic) CZE	Jan Morávek	5	0	3+2	0	0	0
16	MF	(Switzerland) SUI	Ruben Vargas	32	7	18+12	6	2	1
17	MF	(Nigeria) NGR	Noah Sarenren Bazee	5	0	0+5	0	0	0
18	MF	(Slovakia) SVK	László Bénes	12	1	9+3	1	0	0
20	MF	(Germany) GER	Daniel Caligiuri	35	7	31+2	6	2	1
23	MF	(Germany) GER	Marco Richter	29	3	16+13	3	0	0
24	MF	(Finland) FIN	Fredrik Jensen	14	2	1+12	0	0+1	2
25	MF	(Ecuador) ECU	Carlos Gruezo	30	0	22+6	0	1+1	0
28	MF	(Germany) GER	André Hahn	30	9	24+5	8	0+1	1
33	MF	(Germany) GER	Tobias Strobl	31	0	20+9	0	1+1	0
36	MF	(England) ENG	Reece Oxford	25	0	13+11	0	1	0
41	MF	(Germany) GER	Tim Civeja	3	0	0+3	0	0	0
Forwards
7	FW	(Germany) GER	Florian Niederlechner	30	6	21+7	5	1+1	1
11	FW	(Austria) AUT	Michael Gregoritsch	26	1	9+15	1	2	0
27	FW	(Iceland) ISL	Alfreð Finnbogason	18	1	4+13	0	0+1	1
45	FW	(Germany) GER	Lukas Petkov	1	0	0+1	0	0	0
Players transferred out during the season
4	DF	(Germany) GER	Felix Götze	0	0	0	0	0	0
29	MF	(Germany) GER	Eduard Löwen	0	0	0	0	0	0

Last updated: 22 May 2021
Source: Competitions

=== Goalscorers ===
Rank	Pos	No.	Nat	Name	Bundesliga	DFB-Pokal	Total
1	MF	28	(Germany)	André Hahn	8	1	9
2	MF	16	(Switzerland)	Ruben Vargas	6	1	7
2	MF	20	(Germany)	Daniel Caligiuri	6	1	7
4	FW	7	(Germany)	Florian Niederlechner	5	1	6
5	MF	23	(Germany)	Marco Richter	3	0	3
6	MF	24	(Finland)	Fredrik Jensen	0	2	2
7	DF	2	(Poland)	Robert Gumny	1	0	1
7	DF	6	(Netherlands)	Jeffrey Gouweleeuw	1	0	1
7	MF	8	(Germany)	Rani Khedira	1	0	1
7	FW	11	(Austria)	Michael Gregoritsch	1	0	1
7	MF	18	(Slovakia)	László Bénes	1	0	1
7	MF	19	(Germany)	Felix Uduokhai	1	0	1
7	DF	22	(Brazil)	Iago	1	0	1
7	FW	27	(Iceland)	Alfreð Finnbogason	0	1	1
Own goals					1	0	1
Totals					35	7	42

Last updated: 22 May 2021
