= Giovanni Battista Belluzzi =

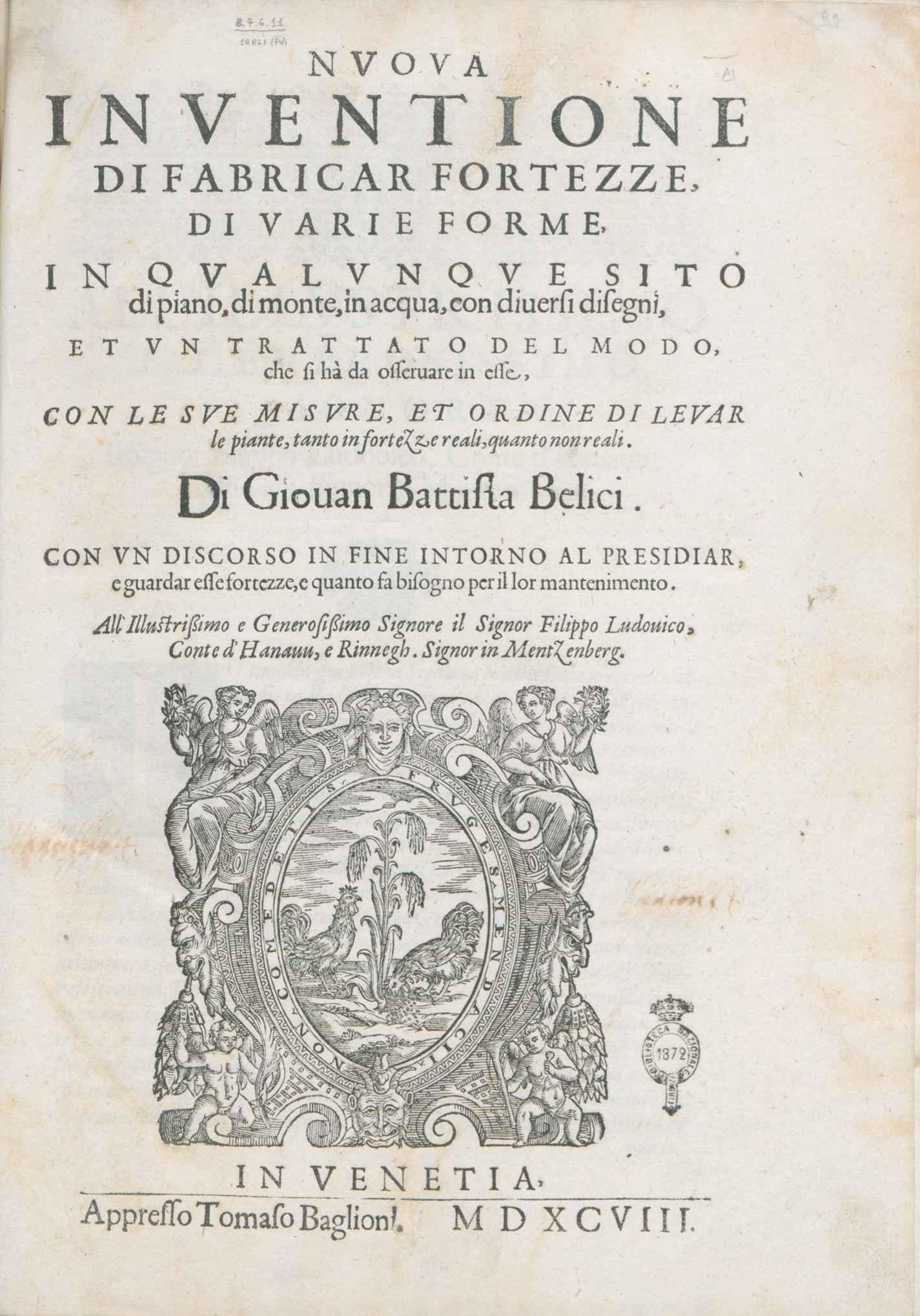
Nuova inventione di fabricar fortezze di varie forme, 1598

Giovanni Battista Belluzzi (1506–1554), also known as Giovanni Battista di Bartolomeo Bellucci and as Il Sanmarino, was a Sammarinese architect and military engineer. He was born in San Marino on September 27, 1506, and at 18 years of age was sent by his father to Bologna, to learn commerce under Bastiano di Ronco, a merchant of the Guild of Wool. After two years, he returned to San Marino, where he set up a wool business of his own. His first wife, Cagli, died shortly after they were married. His second wife was the daughter of Girolamo Genga (1467–1551). The couple lived with Girolamo Genga, from whom Giovanni learned architecture. In 1541, his second wife died, leaving Giovanni to raise two sons. In 1543, Giovanni entered into the service of Cosimo I de' Medici, Grand Duke of Tuscany, as an engineer. He designed fortifications for Florence, Pistoia, Pisa and San Miniato and also wrote a book on military architecture. He was wounded in the siege of Montalcino and was killed by enemy fire in a fortress of Aiuola.

== Works ==
- Nuova inventione di fabricar fortezze di varie forme (in Italian). Venezia: Tommaso Baglioni. 1598.
