= Domenico Bellizzi =

Arbëresh poets

Domenico Bellizzi (1918–1989), also known under the pseudonym of Vorea Ujko, is among the most popular and respected of the Arbëresh poets. Domenico Bellizzi was a modest priest from Frascineto in Calabria who taught modern literature in Firmo. Bellizzi died in a car accident in January 1989.

Bellizzi's verse, a refined lyric expression of Arbëresh being, has appeared in many periodicals and anthologies and in seven collections, four of which were published in Italy, two in Albania and one in Kosovo. Bellizzi is a poet of rich tradition. He is the worthy heir of the great nineteenth-century Arbëresh poets Girolamo De Rada (1814–1903) and Giuseppe Serembe (1844–1901), whom he admired very much. His verse is intimately linked with the Arbëresh experience, imbued with the gjaku i shprishur (the scattered blood). Though devoid of the lingering sentiments of romantic nationalism so common in Albanian verse, and the standard motifs of exile lyrics, Bellizzi's poetry does not fail to evince the strength of his attachment to the culture of his Balkan ancestors despite five hundred years in the dheu i huaj (foreign land).

His verse collections include:

- Zgjimet e gjakut, Castrovillari s.a. (The awakening of the blood);
- Kosovë, Cosenza 1973 (Kossovo);
- Mote moderne, Schiavonea 1976 (Modern times);
- Ankth, Priština 1979 (Anguish);
- Stinët e mia, Corigliano Calabro Stazione 1980 (My seasons);
- Këngë arbëreshe, Tirana 1982 (Arbëresh songs);
- Burimi, Tirana 1985 (The source);
- Hapma derën, zonja mëmë, Tirana 1990 (Open the door, mother).
