= Enzo Domestico Kabregu =

Italian-Uruguayan painter (1906–1971)

- Enzo Domestico Kabregu in his workshop, 1957
- Born: Vincenzo Domestico; December 17, 1906; Acquaformosa, Italy
- Died: July 4, 1971 (aged 64); Montevideo, Uruguay
- Citizenship: Uruguay
- Occupation: Painter
- Spouse: Nerina Bernasconi Guggeri
- Children: Giannina Kabregu Bernasconi; Mônica Kabregu

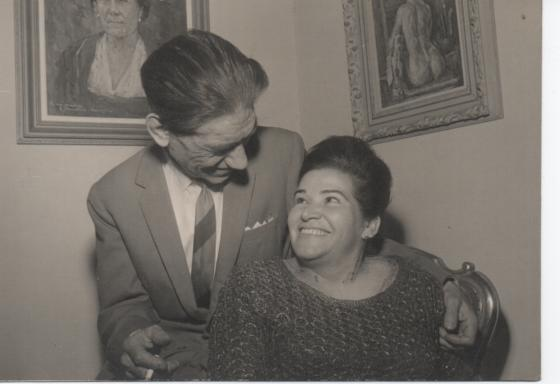
Enzo Domestico Kabregu and Nerina Bernasconi Guggeri, 1960s

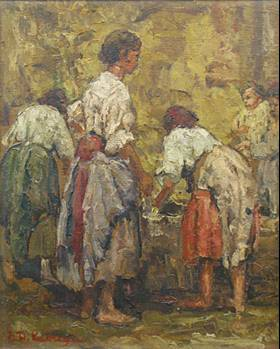
Lavanderas by Enzo Domestico Kabregu, 1930

Enzo Domestico Kabregu (December 17, 1906, Acquaformosa, Italy – July 4, 1971, Montevideo, Uruguay), born Vincenzo Domestico, was an Arbëresh Italian painter and Uruguayan citizen. He was an influential artist in the Post-Impressionism art movement.

== Biography ==
Kabregu was born on December 17, 1906, in Acquaformosa, Italy. His family was part of the Arbëreshë ethnic group and at a young age they moved to the comune of Lungro, which had a large Arbëresh community. His family lived in a huge house in the highest part of the town, referred to as Ka Bregu in the Albanian language, which Kabregu later adopted as a stage name and family surname.

After studying agricultural engineering, Kabregu attended the Naples Academy of Fine Arts and graduated under the guidance of Vincenzo Irolli, Vincenzo Volpe, and Antonio Mancini. He developed a friendship with sculptor Vicenzo Gemito and became a prolific presence in the post impressionist art movement.

After time travelling abroad, he married one of his students, the sculptor and artist Nerina Bernasconi Guggeri. The two of them immigrated to Uruguay in 1934 as part of the Italian-Uruguayan diaspora, where they opened several art workshops and had two daughters, Monica Kabregu and Giannina Kabregu Bernasconi, who became artists as well. Their workshops in Montevideo, the Centro Plástico Athenea ("Althenea Plastic Center") and the Escuela de Cerámica Artística ("School of Ceramic Art"), were important centers of the Uruguayan and Italian artistic community of the time, particularly for women artists.

Kabregu taught Art History and drawing at the Scuola Italiana di Montevideo in Montevideo.

His students included Américo Spósito,

Kabregu mainly painted in the impressionist style, with some forays into cubism. He frequently depicted scenes from both the Arbëresh community and his life in Uruguay in his art.

Kabregu became a naturalized Uruguayan citizen in 1946.

In 1968 he was awarded the title of Knight of Merit of the Italian Republic.

Kabregu died on July 4, 1971, in Montevideo, Uruguay at 64 years old.
