= Richard Bellucci =

American inventor and surgeon

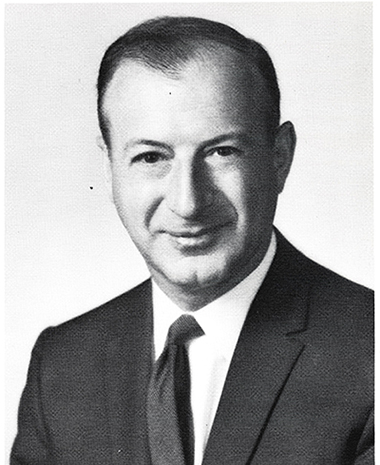
Dr. Richard J. Bellucci MD

Richard Bellucci (April 22, 1914 – December 22, 2005) was an American inventor, surgeon, and otolaryngologist. He invented the Bellucci micro scissors. He mainly worked in the field of microscopic ear surgery. Bellucci served as the president of the American Otological Society and as the chairman of otolaryngology at New York Medical College and the Manhattan Eye, Ear and Throat Hospital.

Bellucci pioneered use of the stapedectomy to successfully treat patients with osteosclerosis and hearing impairment. He also pioneered the use of a microscope in ear surgery. He was the inventor of the Bellucci Micro Ear Scissors which remain a standard surgical tool.

== Early life and education ==
Bellucci was born in New York City in a family of Italian immigrants. He graduated from New York University with B.S. and M.S. degrees in 1936 and 1938, respectively. He graduated from Creighton University School of Medicine in Omaha, Nebraska in 1942 with an M.D. degree.
