= Maria Teresa Bellucci =

Italian politician

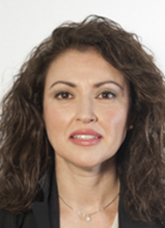
- 2018

Member of the Chamber of Deputies of Italy
- Incumbent
- Assumed office 2018
- Constituency: Lazio 1

Personal details
- Born: 19 July 1972 (age 53) Rome
- Party: Brothers of Italy

Maria Teresa Bellucci is a member of the Chamber of Deputies of Italy and was elected in 2018 and 2022.
