= Proceno =

- Comune
- Comune di Proceno
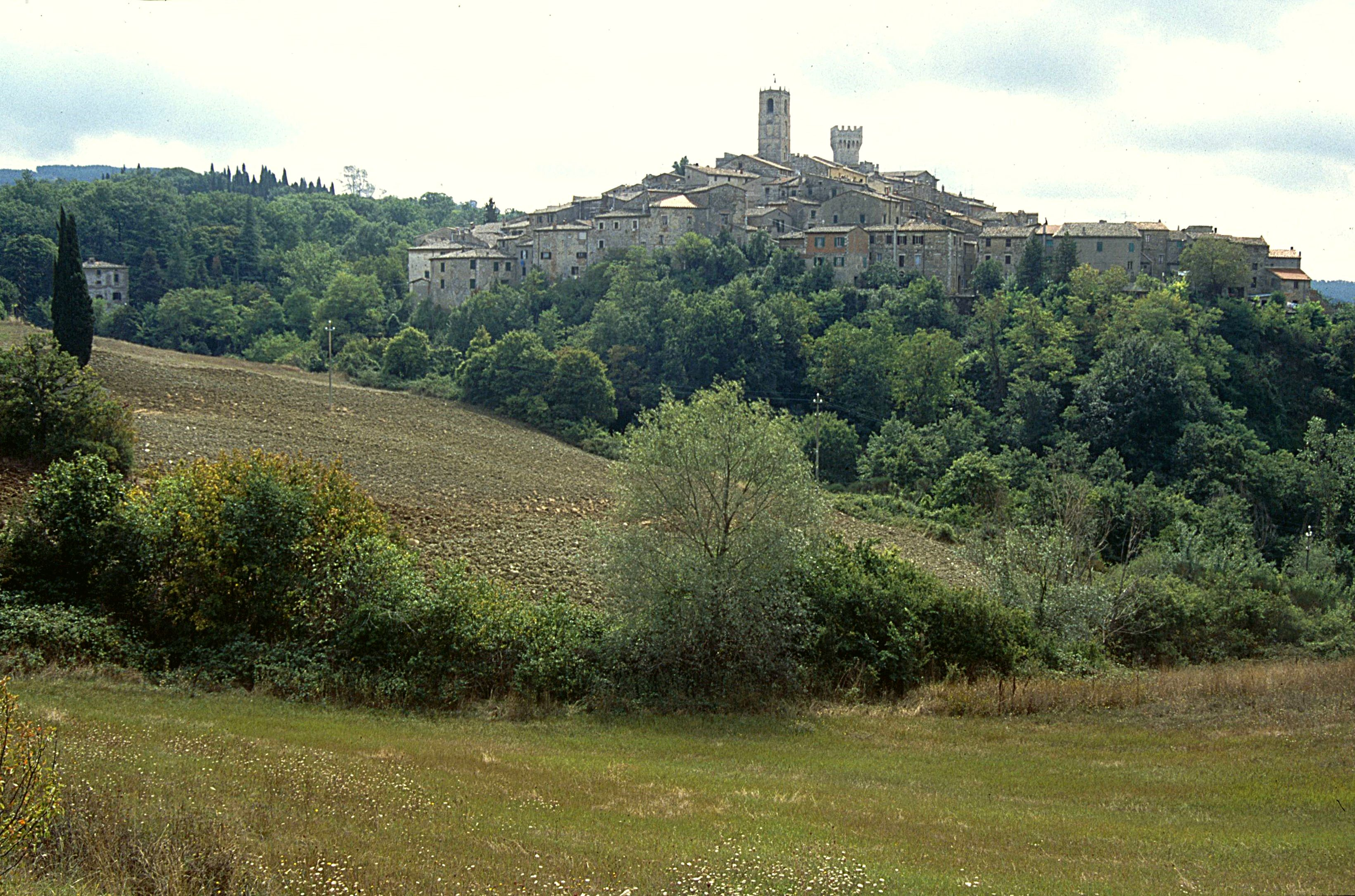

- Location within Italy Location within Lazio
- Coordinates: 42°45′N 11°49′E
- Country: Italy
- Region: Lazio
- Province: Viterbo (VT)
- Frazioni: Centeno, Le Piane

Government
  - Mayor: Roberto Pinzi

Area
  - Total: 42.02 km^{2} (16.22 sq mi)
- Elevation: 418 m (1,371 ft)

Population (31 December 2014)
  - Total: 562
  - Density: 13.4/km^{2} (34.6/sq mi)
- Demonym: Procenesi
- Time zone: UTC+1 (CET)
  - Summer (DST): UTC+2 (CEST)
- Postal code: 01020
- Dialing code: 0763
- Website: Official website

Proceno is a comune (municipality) in the Province of Viterbo in the Italian region of Latium, located about 110 kilometres (68 mi) northwest of Rome and about 45 kilometres (28 mi) northwest of Viterbo.

Proceno borders the following municipalities: Acquapendente, Castell'Azzara, Piancastagnaio, San Casciano dei Bagni, Sorano.

Saint Agnes of Montepulciano established a monastery here.
