= Salvatore Frega =

Italian composer

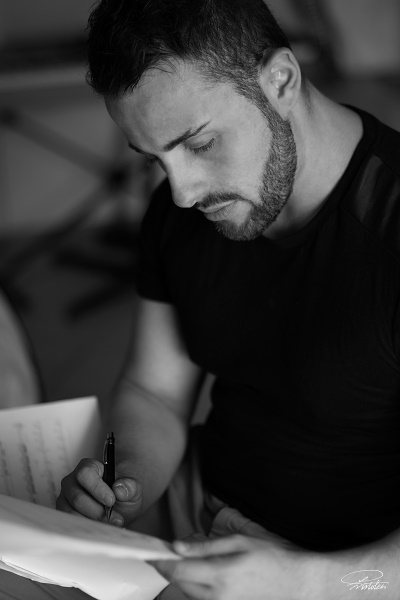
- Salvatore Frega, 1989

Background information
- Born: Salvatore Frega; 29 September 1989 (age 36)
- Origin: Cosenza, Italy
- Genres: Classical, modern
- Occupations: Artistic director, composer
- Label: Warner Music Italy
- Website: www.salvatorefrega.com

Salvatore Frega (born 29 September 1989) is an Italian composer of contemporary classic music, Director of the Accademia Musicale Medicea and of TGmusic.it and Professor at the Conservatory N. Paganini - Genova. President for the 2026/2027 Rotary Year of the Rotary Club of Sant'Anna di Stazzema - Via Francigena. Officially engaged to psychologist, Dr. Elisa Coppa.

== Professional collaborations ==
Salvatore Frega has had commissions and exhibitions such as: Venice Biennale, Koper Biennale, Sanremo Symphony Orchestra, Galilei Orchestra of the Fiesole Music School, Orchestra i Pomeriggi Musicali of Milan, Orchestra of the San Giacomantonio Conservatory of Cosenza, Fiorentina Chamber Orchestra, Budapest Symphony Orchestra MÁV, Pazardzhik Symphony Orchestra, The Kazakh Soloists, Eskisehir Philharmonic Orchestra, Art Center of Singapore, Qazaq Concert, Haydn Symphony Orchestra, Torre del Lago Puccini Symphony Orchestra.

8/9 Agosto 2021 - 67° Festival Puccini at Torre del Lago; with a commission for Ensemble and Voice Reciting with the theme of "Kiss at the time of COVID-19".

1 September 2021 - receives the commission for a world premiere ballet from the Fondazione Ente Luglio Musicale Trapanese.

2022/2023 - Composer in residence of the Puccini Festival of Torre del Lago.

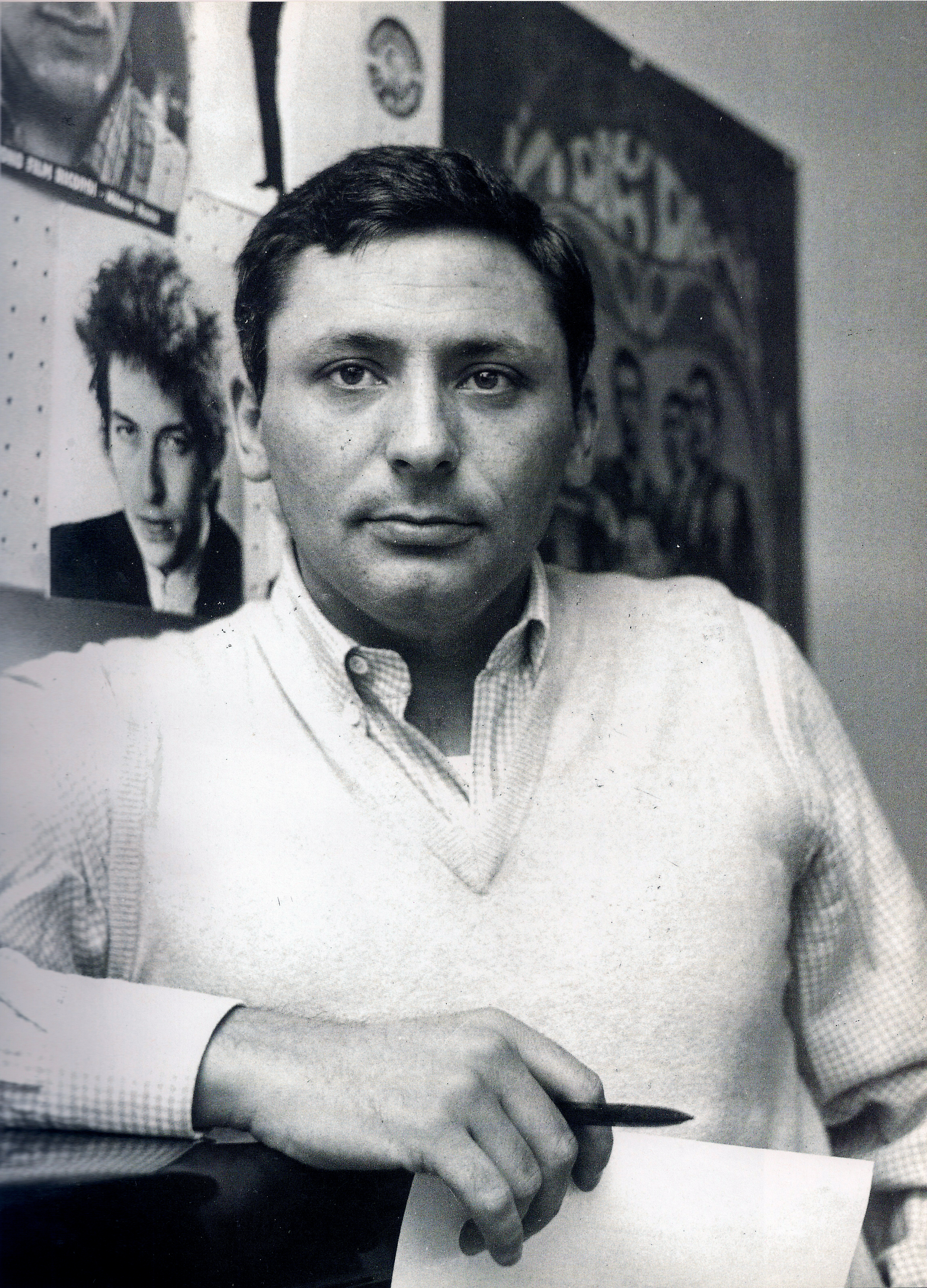
Mogol in 1968

22 December 2022 - Salvatore Frega, the only living composer to enter the Italian Senate with his music, receiving a commission from the Italian Senate to pay homage to Mogol, which premiered at the XXV Christmas Concert in the Italian Senate, live on Rai 1. The orchestra was directed by Maestro Beatrice Venezi.

2025 - World premiere of the concerto for violin and orchestra "Gnosis" conducted by Alessandro Cadario, with Orchestra i Pomeriggi Musicali- Milano." Violin soloist: the talented Benedetta Mignagni

His works have also been broadcast by Kazakh TV, the first national satellite television channel of the Khabar Agency and his scores are published by the Berlin music publisher Ries & Erler and are currently published by Edizioni Curci-Milan.

His music is distributed under ADA by Warner Music.

In 2019, the music critic Renzo Cresti, author of the book “Musica Presente - Tendenze e Compositori di oggi”, dedicated a few pages to Salvatore Frega.

== Awards ==
- April 2012 - Winning Finalist of the III ° International Biennial of Contemporary Music in Koper (Slovenia)
- September 2018 - Winner of the silver medal at the Global Music Awards in Los Angeles with his work "unAnimes"

== Honors ==
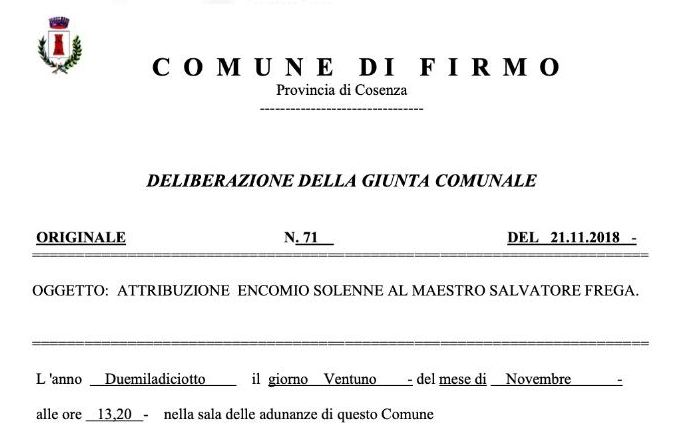
Salvatore Frega, Solemn commendation for his career, Firmo, November 21, 2018

- November 21, 2018 - Solemn commendation for his career, conferred on him by the Municipality of Firmo and the Calabria Region, Italy.

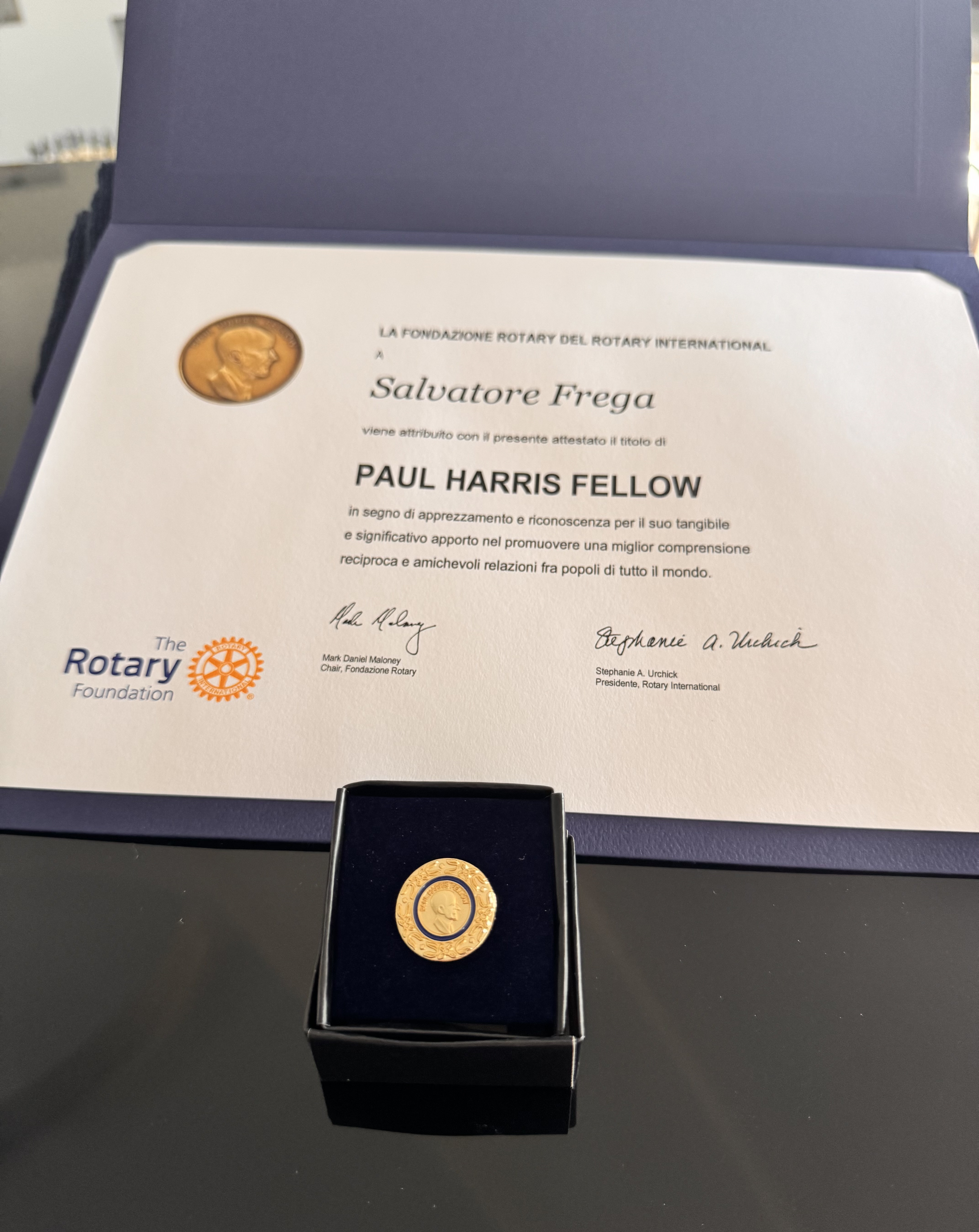

- July 5, 2025, he received the highest honor from Rotary International for his distinguished career, the Paul Harris Fellow.

== Published works ==
- Frega, Salvatore (2012). "Small Hops". Rovato: Edizioni Sconfinarte.
- Frega, Salvatore (2013). "Cercle magique": per flauto, clarinetto, tromba, pianoforte, violino e violoncello / Salvatore Frega. Rovato: Edizioni Sconfinarte.
- Frega, Salvatore (2013). "Vento d'oriente: per clarinetto e pianoforte". Rovato: Edizioni Sconfinarte.
- Frega, Salvatore (2017). "unAnimes". Rovato: Edizioni Sconfinarte.
- Frega, Salvatore (2018). "Magic Horse". Berlin: Ries & Erler.
- Frega, Salvatore (2019). "A ladies' man": for orchestra
- Frega, Salvatore (2019). "venti9". Mannheim: Edition Impronta.

=== Discography ===
- Frega, Salvatore (2015). Eco meridionale. Pompei: Falaut collection.
- Frega, Salvatore (2021). Sweep in Sunrise, Italian Music for Electric Guitar, London: RMN Music
- Frega, Salvatore (2022). Omaggio a Mogol, Orchestra, ADA Music by Warner Music Italy.
- Frega, Salvatore (2024). Stereotype, Electronic Music.
- Frega, Salvatore (2025). Nox Imperii, Epic Music, Orchestra, ADA Music by Warner Music Italy.
