= Andrew Bellucci =

American cook (1964–2023)

Andrew Thierry Bellucci (January 21, 1964 – May 31, 2023) was an American cook.

== Life ==
Bellucci was born on 21 January 1964, in Jersey City, New Jersey.

Initially developed his skills in the East Village, Bellucci's fascination with the history of pizza drove him to rediscover the heritage of New York's pizza-making, tracing its origins to Naples immigrant Gennaro Lombardi. This led him to resurrect a defunct coal oven in Little Italy, persuading Lombardi's grandson to endorse a pizzeria bearing the family name. Later, Lombardi's Pizzeria was established.

Bellucci emerged as a distinguished figure in New York's pizza scene in the 1990s, crafting artisanal pizzas that later influenced a new generation of chefs. His renown was overshadowed by an earlier crime involving embezzlement at a Manhattan law firm, leading to his arrest and a 13-month prison sentence.

Following his prison sentence, Bellucci ventured through a phase of professional obscurity, later resurrecting his culinary career in Malaysia. His return to New York saw him fulfill a lifelong dream of opening his own establishment, Bellucci Pizza, in Astoria in 2020. Further developments included a legal dispute over the naming rights to Bellucci's initial pizzeria in Astoria, which was eventually settled in a federal court in December 2022.

Bellucci died on May 31, 2023, due to a heart attack.
