= Firmo =

Firmo Greek: Fírmon
- Comune
- Comune di Firmo
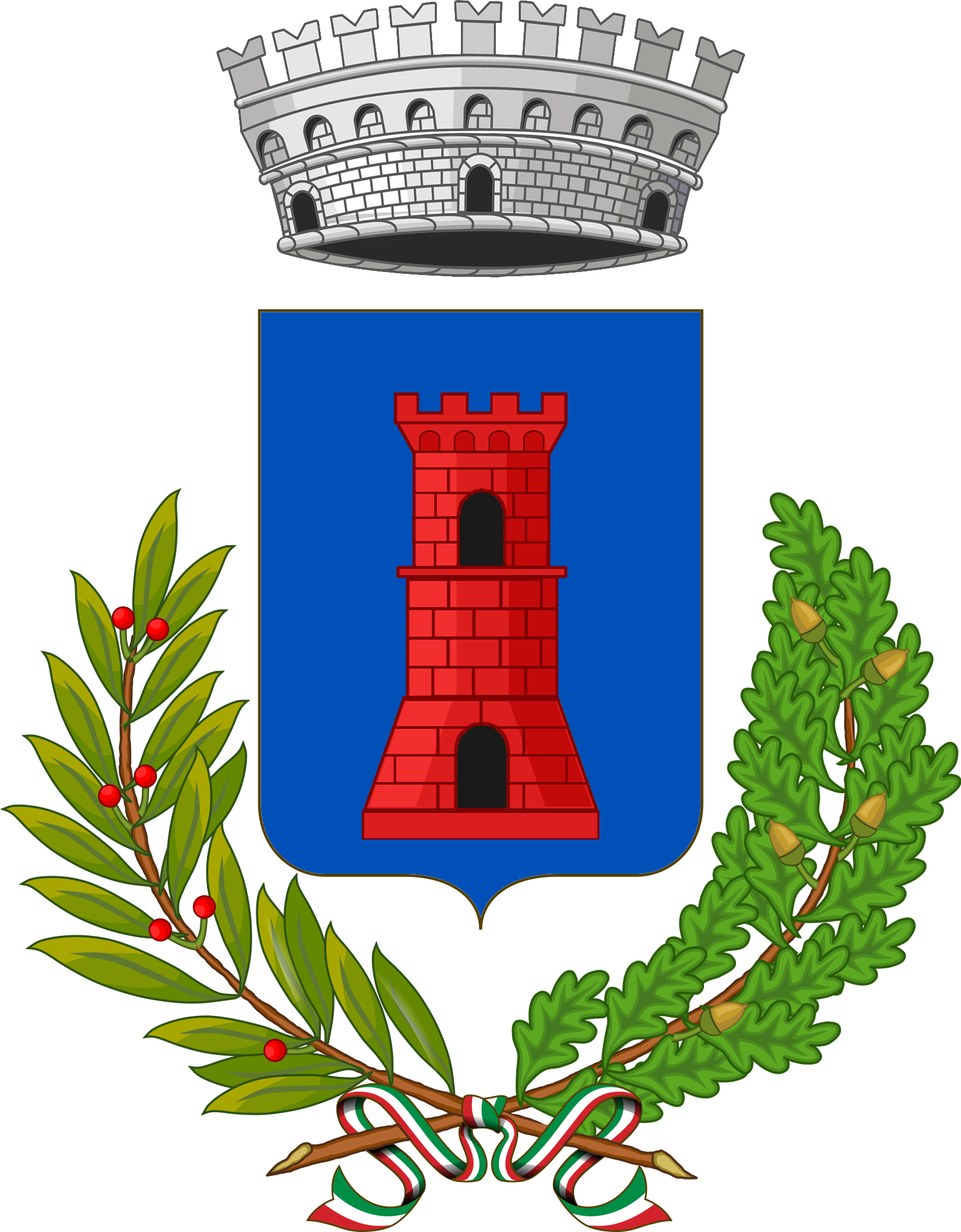
- Coat of arms

- Location within Italy Location within Calabria
- Coordinates: 39°43′N 16°10′E
- Country: Italy
- Region: Calabria
- Province: Cosenza (CS)

Government
  - Mayor: Giuseppe Bosco

Area
  - Total: 11.7 km^{2} (4.5 sq mi)
- Elevation: 370 m (1,210 ft)

Population (2018-01-01)
  - Total: 2,365
  - Density: 202/km^{2} (524/sq mi)
- Demonym: Firmensi
- Time zone: UTC+1 (CET)
  - Summer (DST): UTC+2 (CEST)
- Postal code: 87010
- Dialing code: 0981
- ISTAT code: 078054
- Patron saint: Athanasius of Alexandria
- Website: Official website

Firmo (Arbëreshë Albanian: Ferme; Calabrian: Fìrmu) is a town and comune in the province of Cosenza in the Calabria region of southern Italy, housing a large community of ethnic Albanians.

== Notable people ==
- Salvatore Frega - Italian composer of contemporary cultured music and experimental music
