= Eleuterio Francesco Fortino =

Italian priest

Eleuterio Francesco Fortino (April 21, 1938 – September 22, 2010) was an Italian priest of the Italo-Albanian Catholic Church. Fortino, who was ordained a Catholic priest on 1962, served as Archimandrite in the Eparchy of Lungro in Calabria. He also served as the Under Secretary of the Pontifical Council for Promoting Christian Unity from 1987 until his death on September 22, 2010. Additionally, he headed the Vatican office charged with improving relations with Orthodox Christianity for ten years.

== Honors and awards ==
He was awarded the "Silver Rose" in 2007 for his promotion of good relations between the Vatican and the Orthodox world. He was also the recipient of the Arberia Award in 2009.

== Death ==
Eleuterio Francesco Fortino died at the Tor Vergata hospital in Rome, Italy, on September 22, 2010, aged 72.
