= Capparelli =

Capparelli is an Italian surname. Notable people with the surname include:

- Ralph C. Capparelli (1924–2020), American politician
- Roberto Capparelli (1923–2000), Bolivian footballer
- Vittorio Capparelli, Canadian politician
