= Belluschi =

Belluschi is an Italian surname, derived from the town of Bellusco, in the province of Monza and Brianza, Northern Italy (the place name might ultimately come from the adjective "bello", beautiful). Notable people with the surname include:

- Alfredo Belluschi (1925–2001), Argentine musician
- Fernando Belluschi (born 1983), Argentine footballer
- Pietro Belluschi (1899–1994), Italian-American architect

== See also ==
- Bellucci
