= Mônica Kabregu =

Uruguayan ceramicist and painter

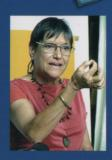
- Mónica Kabregu Bernasconi, 2014
- Born: Mônica Kabregu Bernasconi; March 31, 1947 (age 79); Montevideo, Uruguay
- Occupations: Ceramicist, painter

Mônica Kabregu Bernasconi (born March 31, 1947, Montevideo, Uruguay) is a Uruguayan visual artist, ceramicist, and painter. Her name is also spelled as Mónica Kabregú.

== Biography ==
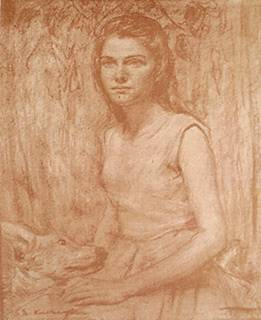
Portrait of Monica Kabregu by her father, Enzo Domestico Kabregu, 1962

Kabregu is the daughter of artists Enzo Domestico Kabregu and Nerina Bernasconi Guggeri and is of Arbëresh descent. Her older sister is the artist Giannina Kabregu Bernasconi and alongside her family members, Kabregu organized and maintained the Centro Plástico Athenea ("Althenea Plastic Center") and the Escuela de Cerámica Artística ("School of Ceramic Art"), prominent art education centers in Uruguay founded by her parents.

From 1995 to the 2010s, Kabregu collaborated with her sister and other artists in an artist collective based in Porto Alegre named Ir-Mano Artistas Latinoamericanos. With this group, she has exhibited her art throughout many different countries in South America and Europe.

In 2001, her artwork was included in an exhibition held as a tribute to the legacy of her father, Enzo Domestico Kabregu, at the Museo del Gaucho y la Moneda, in collaboration with the Banco de la Republica Oriental del Uruguay. She and her sister curated another tribute exhibition at San Ferdando Museum in Maldonado in 2009.

In 2010, her fourth manifesto, Curate, influenced the organization of the travelling international art exhibition Recriando O Planeta ("Recreation or Planet"). In addition to being exhibited in several countries in South America, a 2014 exhibition was installed in the Pedro Figari exhibition hall of the MRREE Ministry of Foreign Affairs in Montevideo.
