= Michael Bellusci =

American drummer

- Born: May 8, 1960 (age 66); Flushing, Queens, New York, US
- Genres: Classic rock, jazz, fusion
- Occupations: Musician, multi-instrumentalist
- Instruments: Drums, bass, guitar, ukulele
- Years active: 1970–present

Michael Bellusci (born May 8, 1960) is a drummer/musician best known for his work with the post 1984 touring company of the Broadway Musical "Beatlemania" and the bands "Strawberry Fields", "Get With It" and "Shock".

== Career ==
Michael Bellusci grew up in Flushing, Queens, in New York City. As a young child, he played guitar at 8 years old then drums at 10. At a very early age he befriended Kasey Smith. The two shared an interest in music, as Smith played keyboards, while Bellusci played drums.

Bellusci and Smith played in a cover bands for a number of years, from 1976 to 1980. In 1980, Smith and Bellusci formed the Jazz/Rock/Fusion group Get With It. They had minor success in 1981, but unfortunately the band never received a record deal, despite their following in the New York area. By the end of 1986, Get With It disbanded, and Smith would join Danger Danger.

In 1987, Bellusci joined up with some local musicians and began playing electronic drums in a house band at a local bar in Bayside, NY named Blossoms. One of those musicians was Mark "Farquar" Vaccacio, who portrayed John Lennon as an original member of The Broadway Cast of Beatlemania. Two other Beatlemania Alumni, Les Fradkin, who was the original George Harrison on Broadway and Don Linares, who played Paul McCartney, did a short run on Broadway before going on the road, also performed regularly with The Conglomowitz. While playing with The Conglomowitz, Bellusci was selected to portray Ringo with the touring cast of the show. He performed with this show for over a decade while also performing as Ringo with a Beatles Tribute Band, Strawberry Fields, based in New York City.

Also while playing at Blossoms, Bellusci began playing with a group that became Wonderous Stories, a Long Island-based cover band that plays Prog Rock and many other types of material. Bellusci left the group after a few years to go on the road, but continues to work with this group to this day, as a sub for the new drummer.

Bellusci and Smith reconnected musically in 2006, forming Shock. They reworked their old material, while in Get With It, and recorded new material.

In 2009, Bellusci was approached by Les Fradkin to play drums with the newly reformed version of Edison Lighthouse for recording and touring. This project never produced any music or live dates.

Bellusci currently plays bass, guitar, ukulele and drums as a freelance musician in the New York City area.

He has played drums for a George Harrison Tribute program called "Here Comes The Sun", which was a multi media presentation with narration by noted author Joshua Greene. Other members of the band for Here Comes The Sun include, Tommy Williams, John Montagna and Godfrey Townsend.

As of July 4, 2013, Bellusci has reprised his role as Ringo Starr with Strawberry Fields. He has played drums in an Off-Broadway Musical Comedy "Cougar The Musical" at St. Luke's Theater in New York City, and subbed on drums with The Big Apple Circus in 2017.

As of September 8, 2017, Bellusci has been offered and accepted the drum chair for The Big Apple Circus at Lincoln Center in New York City and subsequent tours including Boston and Philadelphia. Bellusci currently owns and runs his own small recording studio, MB Studio in Queens, NY.
