= Mario Bellizzi =

Italian poet

Mario Bellizzi (born 1957), a poet of the Arbëresh minority of southern Italy, was born in San Basile in the province of Cosenza. His verse has appeared in various Arbëresh periodicals in southern Italy, as well as in Kosovo and Albania. Bellizzi currently lives in Trebisacce on the Gulf of Taranto. Among his verse collections are: Who are We Now?, Peć 1997; and Last Exit to Bukura Morea, Castrovillari 2003.

== Sources ==
- Albanian Literature from Robert Elsie
