= Odone Belluzzi =

Italian engineer (1892–1956)

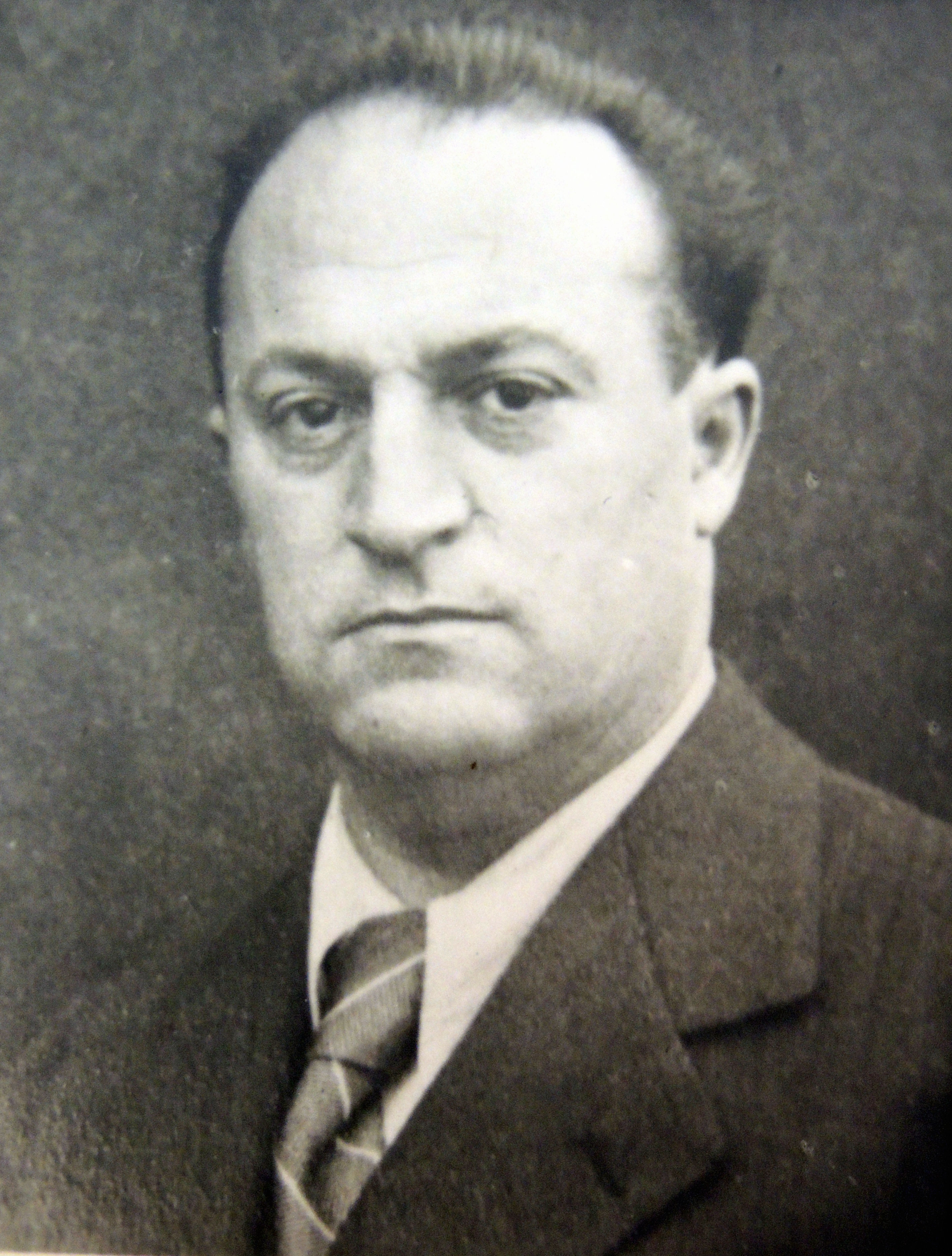

Odone Belluzzi (Bologna, 1 February 1892 – Bologna, 24 August 1956) was an Italian engineer. His contributions were fundamental to the development and teaching of building science in the 20th century.

== Biography ==
Odone's mother was left a widow and she had to face economic difficulties which affected Odone's childhood. Because of the economic problems Odone was forced to leave school in order to obtain a necessary income so he started to work. Although his interests for the lecture and the passion for the study didn't allow him to stop developing his culture. He started to be an working student, he worked during the day and studied at night. He frequented The "Universita Popolare" and after three years he graduated at Aldini-Valeriani technical institute. After graduation he started to work at Aldini-Valeriani as a teacher assistant of Physics and Electronics. During that period he enrolled himself to school of application of engineers at Celestini square. After two years of study he was forced to participate in war as artillery officer. He got his academic degree in 1921. In 1927, he obtained a licence to become a teacher. In 1928, professor Albenga was called to hold the chair of Building Bridges at the Polytechnic University of Turin and he proposed Odone as his substitute in Science of Construction and after three years in 1931 Odone won a contest and could teach Science of Structures in Bologna. He was awarded by the Alessandro Volta foundation of Italy Academy. Afterwards he was also awarded Vallauri foundation Odone Belluzzi enjoyed his success in life, right in the period when the university colleges of Engineering and the studies in Construction Science were reaching a high level and were competing among them to get preeminence. During the summer of 1954 he flew to Brazil to hold a tour of courses and conferences. Unfortunately he had health problems probably due to hot climate and got sick and weak. When he came back to Bologna, he had to undergo a surgery, followed by a period of rehabilitation. Even if he loved walking on Bologna's hills, his wealth problems forced him give up his passion and made him stay at home all the time. Despite his sickness, he wanted to teach at university, because he didn't want to disappoint his students.

In May 1956, he held his last lesson, all of his students filled the lecture hall and thanked him with a standing ovation. It's on 24 August of the same year that Odone Belluzzi, still with lucid mind, dies.

== Treatise of buildings science ==
The work "Scienza delle Costruzioni" of the school Odone Belluzzi aims to teach the subject Scienza delle Costruzioni in the university departments of architecture and engineering. Originally, it was divided into three volumes, now it is composed of four. The works starts from the easiest concepts, gradually growing, evaluating new difficulties, explaining the text with comments and notes so to get concepts easier. The work also contains many exercises, with the aim of showing prominent aspects and advantages. The student in this way is encouraged and stimulated in a subject which seems apparently difficult. The work deals with every aspect of the subject starting from its basis, which are linked with statistics and analytic mechanics.

In the first volume (1940–41) is developed a theory about elastic beam's strain, proving in a simple mode the respective formulas and theorem. That method allows the evolving of the linear beam's, continuum beam's, frame's and even structure's calculus.
The second volume (1943–50) is about the elastic arch structure, the steel structure's implementation.
The third volume (1961) is about the slab structure's, sheet structure's, vault structure's problem and is about the plastic material's performance.
The fourth volume (1955) expound on balance's instability's problem and vibration's problem.
The treatise was published from Zanichelli and was translated in several language. Odone Belluzzi guaranteed that the treatise will be effective for half a century, and so it was.
