= 2022–23 FC Augsburg season =

FC Augsburg
2022–23 season
- Chairman: Klaus Hofmann
- Head coach: Enrico Maaßen
- Stadium: WWK Arena
- Bundesliga: 15th
- DFB-Pokal: Second round
- Top goalscorer: League: Mërgim Berisha (9); All: Mërgim Berisha (9)
Home colours	Away colours	Third colours

The 2022–23 season was the 116th season in the history of FC Augsburg and their 12th consecutive season in the top flight. The club participated in the Bundesliga and the DFB-Pokal.

== Players ==
=== First-team squad ===
As of 20 February 2023

Note: Flags indicate national team as defined under FIFA eligibility rules; some limited exceptions apply. Players may hold more than one non-FIFA nationality.

No.	Pos.	Nation	Player
1	GK	POL	Rafał Gikiewicz
2	DF	POL	Robert Gumny
3	DF	DEN	Mads Valentin
4	DF	ENG	Reece Oxford
5	MF	GER	Tobias Strobl
6	DF	NED	Jeffrey Gouweleeuw (captain)
7	FW	CRO	Dion Beljo
8	MF	POR	Renato Veiga (on loan from Sporting CP B)
9	FW	BIH	Ermedin Demirović
10	MF	GER	Arne Maier
11	FW	GER	Mërgim Berisha (on loan from Fenerbahçe)
13	MF	GER	Elvis Rexhbeçaj
14	MF	AUT	Julian Baumgartlinger
16	MF	SUI	Ruben Vargas
17	MF	NGR	Noah Sarenren Bazee
19	DF	GER	Felix Uduokhai (third captain)

No.	Pos.	Nation	Player
20	MF	GER	Daniel Caligiuri (vice-captain)
22	DF	BRA	Iago
23	DF	GER	Maximilian Bauer
24	MF	FIN	Fredrik Jensen
25	GK	GER	Daniel Klein
27	MF	BEL	Arne Engels
28	MF	GER	André Hahn (fourth captain)
30	MF	GER	Niklas Dorsch (fifth captain)
34	FW	FRA	Nathanaël Mbuku
38	DF	CRO	David Čolina
39	GK	GER	Benjamin Leneis
40	GK	CZE	Tomáš Koubek
42	DF	GER	Aaron Zehnter
45	FW	ITA	Kelvin Yeboah (on loan from Genoa)
48	FW	FRA	Irvin Cardona

=== Out on loan ===
Note: Flags indicate national team as defined under FIFA eligibility rules; some limited exceptions apply. Players may hold more than one non-FIFA nationality.

No.	Pos.	Nation	Player
—	MF	GER	Tim Civeja (at FC Ingolstadt 04 until 30 June 2023)
—	DF	GER	Raphael Framberger (at SV Sandhausen until 30 June 2023)
—	DF	GER	Felix Götze (at Rot-Weiss Essen until 30 June 2023)
—	FW	GER	Lasse Günther (at Jahn Regensburg until 30 June 2023)
—	FW	GER	Henri Koudossou (at Austria Lustenau until 30 June 2023)
—	FW	GER	Maurice Malone (at Wolfsberger AC until 30 June 2023)
—	FW	USA	Ricardo Pepi (at FC Groningen until 30 June 2023)
—	FW	GER	Lukas Petkov (at Greuther Fürth until 30 June 2023)
—	DF	CRO	Jozo Stanić (at Varaždin until 30 June 2023)
—	DF	DEN	Frederik Winther (at Brøndby until 30 June 2023)

== Transfers ==
=== In ===
No.	Pos	Player	Transferred from	Fee	Date	Source
10	MF	Arne Maier (GER)	Hertha BSC (GER)	€5,000,000	1 July 2022	
23	DF	Maximilian Bauer (GER)	Greuther Fürth (GER)	Free	1 July 2022	
9	FW	Ermedin Demirović (BIH)	SC Freiburg (GER)	Free	8 July 2022	
13	MF	Elvis Rexhbeçaj (GER)	VfL Wolfsburg (GER)	€1,700,000	27 July 2022	
14	MF	Julian Baumgartlinger (AUT)	Bayer Leverkusen (GER)	Free	16 August 2022	
11	FW	Mërgim Berisha (GER)	Fenerbahçe (TUR)	Loan	31 August 2022	
27	MF	Arne Engels (BEL)	Club NXT (BEL)	€100,000	3 January 2023	
7	FW	Dion Beljo (CRO)	NK Osijek (CRO)	€3,000,000	13 January 2023	
38	DF	David Čolina (CRO)	Hajduk Split (CRO)	€650,000	14 January 2023	
45	FW	Kelvin Yeboah (ITA)	Genoa (ITA)	Loan	18 January 2023	
48	FW	Irvin Cardona (FRA)	Brest (FRA)	€500,000	18 January 2023	
34	FW	Nathanaël Mbuku (FRA)	Reims (FRA)	Free	30 January 2023	
8	MF	Renato Veiga (POR)	Sporting CP B (POR)	Loan	31 January 2023	

=== Out ===
No.	Pos	Player	Transferred to	Fee	Date	Source
14	MF	Jan Morávek (CZE)		Free	1 July 2022	
15	DF	Jozo Stanić (CRO)	Varaždin (CRO)	Loan	1 July 2022	
27	FW	Alfreð Finnbogason (ISL)	Lyngby (DEN)	Free	1 July 2022	
41	MF	Tim Civeja (GER)	FC Ingolstadt 04 (GER)	Loan	1 July 2022	
11	FW	Michael Gregoritsch (AUT)	SC Freiburg (GER)	Free	8 July 2022	
29	FW	Lasse Günther (GER)	Jahn Regensburg (GER)	Loan	10 August 2022	
31	DF	Felix Götze (GER)	Rot-Weiss Essen (GER)	Loan	29 August 2022	
18	FW	Ricardo Pepi (USA)	FC Groningen (NED)	Loan	31 August 2022	
37	FW	Maurice Malone (GER)	Wolfsberger AC (AUT)	Loan	1 September 2022	
44	FW	Henri Koudossou (GER)	Austria Lustenau (AUT)	Loan	1 September 2022	
32	DF	Raphael Framberger (GER)	SV Sandhausen (GER)	Loan	11 January 2023	
7	FW	Florian Niederlechner (GER)	Hertha BSC (GER)	€500,000	18 January 2023	
8	MF	Carlos Gruezo (ECU)	San Jose Earthquakes (USA)	€3,700,000	31 January 2023	
21	MF	Lukas Petkov (GER)	Greuther Fürth (GER)	Loan	31 January 2023	
26	DF	Frederik Winther (DEN)	Brøndby (DEN)	Loan	31 January 2023	
33	FW	Sergio Córdova (VEN)	Vancouver Whitecaps (CAN)	€2,100,000	20 February 2023	

== Pre-season and friendlies ==
Win Draw Loss Fixtures

28 June 2022 Friendly	Schwaben Augsburg	0–5	FC Augsburg	Augsburg, Germany
19:00 CEST (UTC+2)		Report	Pepi 33'; Gruber 63'; Iago 73', 80'; Hahn 85'	Stadium: Rosenaustadion

1 July 2022 Friendly	VfB Eichstätt	0–5	FC Augsburg	Donauwörth, Germany
18:00 CEST (UTC+2)		Report	Gumny 10', 42'; Iago 45'; Moratz 67' (o.g.); Götze 87'	Stadium: Stauferpark Stadion; Attendance: 1,000

8 July 2022 Friendly	FC Augsburg	1–1	SV Sandhausen	Augsburg, Germany
17:30 CEST (UTC+2)	Caligiuri 37'	Report	Pulkrab 84'	Stadium: Rasenplatz Zusmarshausen Hauptfeld; Attendance: 2,000

13 July 2022 Friendly	FC Augsburg	0–1	České Budějovice	Kössen, Austria
18:00 CEST (UTC+2)		Report	Vais 80'	Stadium: Kaiserwinkl Arena

17 July 2022 Friendly	FC Augsburg	Cancelled	Al-Duhail	Austria
16:00 CEST (UTC+2)
Note: Augsburg cancelled their match against Al-Duhail after finding Schalke as an alternative opponent.

17 July 2022 Friendly	Schalke 04	1–1	FC Augsburg	Mittersill, Austria
16:30 CEST (UTC+2)	Polter 78'	Report	Uduokhai 54'	Stadium: Waldstadion; Attendance: 1,500; Referee: Arnes Talic

23 July 2022 Friendly	FC Augsburg	2–3	Rennes	Augsburg, Germany
15:30 CEST (UTC+2)	Demirović 22'; Malone 117'	Report	Bourigeaud 5'; Laborde 54'; Uduokhai 56' (o.g.)	Stadium: WWK Arena; Attendance: 6,500
Note: Match was played in four 30-minute periods.

22 September 2022 Friendly	FC Augsburg	5–2	Austria Lustenau	Augsburg, Germany
18:00 CEST (UTC+2)	Berisha 8', 27', 38', 52'; Valentin 82'	Report	Rhein 43'; Koudossou 87'	Stadium: Rosenaustadion

10 December 2022 Friendly	FC Augsburg	3–0	Grasshoppers	Augsburg, Germany
14:00 CET (UTC+1)	Winther 27'; Petkov 37'; Maier 41'	Report		Stadium: WWK Arena

16 December 2022 Friendly	FC Augsburg	2–0	1. FC Heidenheim	Germany
14:00 CET (UTC+1)	Demirović 18'; Winther 85'	Report

7 January 2023 Friendly	Union Berlin	1–0	FC Augsburg	Orihuela Costa, Spain
13:00 CET (UTC+1)	Pefok 57' (pen.)	Report		Stadium: Real Club de Golf Campoamor Campo 1 Attendance: 300

7 January 2023 Friendly	Union Berlin	4–1	FC Augsburg	Orihuela Costa, Spain
15:00 CET (UTC+1)	Michel 12', 39'; Leweling 26'; Behrens 35'	Report	Petkov 81'	Stadium: Real Club de Golf Campoamor Campo 1 Attendance: 400

11 January 2023 Friendly	FC Augsburg	0–2	Ferencváros	La Nucía, Spain
15:00 CET (UTC+1)		Report	Mercier 62', 74'	Stadium: Estadi Olímpic Camilo Cano

14 January 2023 Friendly	FC Augsburg	0–4	VfL Wolfsburg	Augsburg, Germany
13:00 CET (UTC+1)		Report	Ambros 10'; Nmecha 12'; Baku 49', 55'	Stadium: FCA-Trainingsgelände

14 January 2023 Friendly	FC Augsburg	1–0	VfL Wolfsburg	Augsburg, Germany
15:00 CET (UTC+1)	Vargas 73'	Report	Arnold (penalty missed) 90+3'	Stadium: FCA-Trainingsgelände

23 March 2023 Friendly	FC Augsburg	4–2	St. Gallen	Augsburg, Germany
14:00 CET (UTC+1)				Stadium: WWK Arena

== Competitions ==
=== Overall record ===
Competition	First match	Last match	Starting round	Final position	Record							
Competition	First match	Last match	Starting round	Final position	Pld	W	D	L	GF	GA	GD	Win %
Bundesliga	6 August 2022	27 May 2023	Matchday 1	15th	34	9	7	18	42	63	−21	26.47
DFB-Pokal	31 July 2022	19 October 2022	First round	Second round	2	1	0	1	6	5	+1	50.00
Total					36	10	7	19	48	68	−20	27.78

Source: Soccerway

=== Bundesliga ===
==== League table ====
Pos	Team	Pld	W	D	L	GF	GA	GD	Pts	Qualification or relegation
13	Werder Bremen	34	10	6	18	51	64	−13	36	
14	VfL Bochum	34	10	5	19	40	72	−32	35	
15	FC Augsburg	34	9	7	18	42	63	−21	34	
16	VfB Stuttgart (O)	34	7	12	15	45	57	−12	33	Qualification for the relegation play-offs
17	Schalke 04 (R)	34	7	10	17	35	71	−36	31	Relegation to 2. Bundesliga

Source: DFB
Rules for classification: 1) Points; 2) Goal difference; 3) Goals scored; 4) Head-to-head results; 5) Head-to-head away goals scored; 6) Away goals scored; 7) Play-off.
(O) Play-off winners; (R) Relegated

==== Results summary ====
Overall								Home						Away					
Pld	W	D	L	GF	GA	GD	Pts	W	D	L	GF	GA	GD	W	D	L	GF	GA	GD
34	9	7	18	42	63	−21	34	6	4	7	16	24	−8	3	3	11	26	39	−13

Source: DFB

==== Results by round ====
Round	1	2	3	4	5	6	7	8	9	10	11	12	13	14	15	16	17	18	19	20	21	22	23	24	25	26	27	28	29	30	31	32	33	34
Ground	H	A	H	A	H	A	H	A	H	A	H	A	H	A	H	A	H	A	H	A	H	A	H	A	H	A	H	A	H	A	H	A	H	A
Result	L	W	L	L	L	W	W	W	D	L	D	L	L	D	L	L	W	L	W	L	W	L	W	L	D	D	L	L	D	D	W	L	L	L
Position	17	9	10	14	16	13	11	10	10	12	12	13	13	14	14	15	14	14	13	13	13	13	13	13	12	12	13	14	13	13	13	13	14	15

Source: DFB
A = Away; H = Home; W = Win; D = Draw; L = Loss

==== Matches ====
The league fixtures were announced on 17 June 2022.

6 August 2022 1	FC Augsburg	0–4	SC Freiburg	Augsburg
15:30 CEST (UTC+2)		Report	Gregoritsch 46'; Grifo 48'; Ginter 61'; Dōan 78'	Stadium: WWK Arena; Attendance: 25,310; Referee: Bastian Dankert

13 August 2022 2	Bayer Leverkusen	1–2	FC Augsburg	Leverkusen
15:30 CEST (UTC+2)	Aránguiz 43'; Azmoun (yellow card) 79'	Report	Jensen 15'; Valentin (yellow card) 35'; Demirović (yellow card) 42'; Gouweleeuw (yellow card) 70'; Rexhbeçaj (yellow card) 75'; Gikiewicz (yellow card) 82'; Hahn 82'; Bauer (yellow card) 89'	Stadium: BayArena; Attendance: 22,903; Referee: Benjamin Cortus

20 August 2022 3	FC Augsburg	1–2	Mainz 05	Augsburg
15:30 CEST (UTC+2)	Gouweleeuw (yellow card) 3'; Rexhbeçaj (yellow card) 29'; Demirović 35'	Report	Bell (yellow card) 29'; Onisiwo 31'; Martín (penalty missed) 62'; Burkardt (yellow card) 62'; Lee Jae-sung 90+3'	Stadium: WWK Arena; Attendance: 23,755; Referee: Sascha Stegemann

27 August 2022 4	1899 Hoffenheim	1–0	FC Augsburg	Sinsheim
15:30 CEST (UTC+2)	Geiger 39'; Kabak (yellow card) 72'	Report	Bauer (yellow card) 59'	Stadium: Rhein-Neckar-Arena; Attendance: 17,206; Referee: Tobias Welz

4 September 2022 5	FC Augsburg	0–2	Hertha BSC	Augsburg
15:30 CEST (UTC+2)	Gruezo (yellow card) 31'; Berisha (yellow card) 72'	Report	Uremović (yellow card) 23'; Lukebakio 57'; Richter 90+3'	Stadium: WWK Arena; Attendance: 25,789; Referee: Harm Osmers

9 September 2022 6	Werder Bremen	0–1	FC Augsburg	Bremen
20:30 CEST (UTC+2)	Groß (yellow card) 25'; Füllkrug (yellow card) 38'; Schmidt (yellow card) 90+4'; Ducksch (penalty missed) 90+4'; Pieper (yellow card) 90+8'	Report	Rexhbeçaj (yellow card) 32'; Demirović 63'; Bauer (yellow card) 76'; Gouweleeuw (yellow card) 90+3'; Gruezo (yellow card) 90+4'; Gikiewicz (yellow card) 90+6'	Stadium: Weserstadion; Attendance: 41,000; Referee: Martin Petersen

17 September 2022 7	FC Augsburg	1–0	Bayern Munich	Augsburg
15:30 CEST (UTC+2)	Berisha (yellow card) 31', (goal) 59'; Hahn (yellow card) 45'; Gouweleeuw (yellow card) 58'	Report	Mané (yellow card) 38'	Stadium: WWK Arena; Attendance: 30,660; Referee: Marco Fritz

2 October 2022 8	Schalke 04	2–3	FC Augsburg	Gelsenkirchen
17:30 CEST (UTC+2)	Terodde 33', (yellow card) 34'; Bülter (yellow card) 34'; Krauß 63'	Report	Demirović 9', 21', (yellow card) 73'; Bauer (yellow card) 30'; Berisha (yellow card) 34' (yellow-red card) 70'; Niederlechner (yellow card) 68'; Gumny (yellow card) 74'; Hahn 77'	Stadium: Veltins-Arena; Attendance: 60,328; Referee: Daniel Schlager

8 October 2022 9	FC Augsburg	1–1	VfL Wolfsburg	Augsburg
15:30 CEST (UTC+2)	Bauer (yellow card) 38'; Gruezo (yellow card) 40'; Gouweleeuw (yellow card) 40'; Gumny 55'; Iago (yellow card) 84'; Caligiuri (yellow card) 90'	Report	Gerhardt 27', (yellow card) 37'; Otávio (yellow card) 40'; Guilavogui (yellow card) 75'	Stadium: WWK Arena; Attendance: 26,220; Referee: Daniel Siebert

16 October 2022 10	1. FC Köln	3–2	FC Augsburg	Cologne
15:30 CEST (UTC+2)	Tigges 47', 81'; Huseinbašić 61'; Duda (yellow card) 62'; Uth (yellow card) 90'	Report	Niederlechner 14'; Berisha (yellow card) 22'; Vargas (yellow card) 36'; Iago (yellow card) 54'; Caligiuri 68'; Petkov (yellow card) 79'	Stadium: RheinEnergieStadion; Attendance: 49,000; Referee: Felix Zwayer

22 October 2022 11	FC Augsburg	3–3	RB Leipzig	Augsburg
15:30 CEST (UTC+2)	Berisha (yellow card) 22', (goal) 34' (pen.); Demirović (yellow card) 37', (goal) 51'; Gruezo (yellow card) 60'; Vargas 64'; Iago (yellow card) 66' (yellow-red card) 66'; Gouweleeuw (yellow card) 83'; Rexhbecaj (yellow card) 90+3'	Report	Silva (yellow card) 21', (goal) 73'; Nkunku 89'; Novoa 90'	Stadium: WWK Arena; Attendance: 25,109; Referee: Robert Schröder

29 October 2022 12	VfB Stuttgart	2–1	FC Augsburg	Stuttgart
15:30 CEST (UTC+2)	Guirassy 15'; Pfeiffer (yellow card) 90'; Anton 90+1'	Report	Niederlechner 4'; Gruezo (yellow card) 13'; Rexhbecaj (yellow card) 78'	Stadium: Mercedes-Benz Arena; Attendance: 46,400; Referee: Tobias Stieler

5 November 2022 13	FC Augsburg	1–2	Eintracht Frankfurt	Augsburg
15:30 CET (UTC+1)	Berisha 1'	Report	Rode 13'; Knauff 64'; Ndicka (yellow card) 71'	Stadium: Augsburg Arena; Attendance: 30,087; Referee: Deniz Aytekin

9 November 2022 14	Union Berlin	2–2	FC Augsburg	Berlin
20:30 CET (UTC+1)	Becker 7'; Khedira (yellow card) 12'; Behrens 22'	Report	Niederlechner 8', 39'; Gumny (yellow card) 20'; Bauer (yellow card) 21'; Demirović (yellow card) 25'; Gouweleeuw (yellow card) 47'	Stadium: Stadion An der Alten Försterei; Attendance: 21,614; Referee: Sascha Stegemann

12 November 2022 15	FC Augsburg	0–1	VfL Bochum	Augsburg
15:30 CET (UTC+1)	Berisha (penalty missed) 61', (yellow card) 90+1'	Report	Antwi-Adjei 58'; Osei-Tutu (yellow card) 90+1'	Stadium: WWK Arena; Attendance: 28,011; Referee: Felix Brych

22 January 2023 16	Borussia Dortmund	4–3	FC Augsburg	Dortmund
15:30 CET (UTC+1)	Bellingham 29', (yellow card) 84'; Schlotterbeck 42'; Bynoe-Gittens 75'; Reyna 78'	Report	Maier 40'; Valentin (yellow card) 45'; Demirović 45+1'; Cardona (yellow card) 54'; Jensen (yellow card) 69'; Čolina 76'; Engels (yellow card) 90+2'	Stadium: Signal Iduna Park; Attendance: 81,365; Referee: Frank Willenborg

25 January 2023 17	FC Augsburg	1–0	Borussia Mönchengladbach	Augsburg
20:30 CET (UTC+1)	Berisha 82'; Dorsch (yellow card) 84'	Report	Lainer (yellow card) 31'; Pléa (yellow card) 66'	Stadium: WWK Arena; Attendance: 23,158; Referee: Daniel Schlager

28 January 2023 18	SC Freiburg	3–1	FC Augsburg	Freiburg
15:30 CET (UTC+1)	Gregoritsch 13'; Höler 30'; Lienhart (yellow card) 37', (goal) 85'; Eggestein (yellow card) 75'; Wagner (yellow card) 79'	Report	Uduokhai (yellow card) 7'; Berisha 29' (pen.), (yellow card) 36'; Demirović (yellow card) 68'	Stadium: Europa-Park Stadion; Attendance: 33,500; Referee: Christian Dingert

3 February 2023 19	FC Augsburg	1–0	Bayer Leverkusen	Augsburg
20:30 CET (UTC+1)	Beljo (yellow card) 37'; Berisha 55'; Maier (yellow card) 59'; Engels (yellow card) 72'	Report	Hincapié (yellow card) 27'; Adli (yellow card) 60'	Stadium: WWK Arena; Attendance: 27,318; Referee: Marco Fritz

11 February 2023 20	Mainz 05	3–1	FC Augsburg	Mainz
15:30 CET (UTC+1)	Lee Jae-sung 21', 52'; Onisiwo 24'; Stach (yellow card) 34'	Report	Demirović 28' (pen.); Gumny (yellow card) 33'	Stadium: Mewa Arena; Attendance: 22,200; Referee: Sven Jablonski

17 February 2023 21	FC Augsburg	1–0	1899 Hoffenheim	Augsburg
20:30 CET (UTC+1)	Engels (yellow card) 35'; Berisha (yellow card) 43'; Gouweleeuw (yellow card) 49'; Jensen 88'	Report	Kabak (yellow card) 39'; Kadeřábek (yellow card) 65'; Akpoguma (yellow card) 90+5'	Stadium: WWK Arena; Attendance: 25,872; Referee: Patrick Ittrich

25 February 2023 22	Hertha BSC	2–0	FC Augsburg	Berlin
15:30 CET (UTC+1)	Richter (yellow card) 35', (goal) 61'; Lukebakio 70'	Report	Gumny (yellow card) 45+1'; Veiga (yellow card) 60'; Vargas (yellow card) 90+1'	Stadium: Olympiastadion; Attendance: 40,522; Referee: Matthias Jöllenbeck

4 March 2023 23	FC Augsburg	2–1	Werder Bremen	Augsburg
15:30 CET (UTC+1)	Beljo 5'; Veiga (yellow card) 28'; Maier 46'; Valentin (yellow card) 64'	Report	Stage 16'; Bittencourt (yellow card) 60'; Groß (yellow card) 61'; Ducksch (yellow card) 90+4'	Stadium: WWK Arena; Attendance: 30,660; Referee: Felix Zwayer

11 March 2023 24	Bayern Munich	5–3	FC Augsburg	Munich
15:30 CET (UTC+1)	Cancelo 15', (yellow card) 85'; Pavard 19', 35'; Sané 45'; De Ligt (yellow card) 59'; Davies 74'	Report	Berisha 3', 60' (pen.); Valentin (yellow card) 18'; Cardona 90+3'	Stadium: Allianz Arena; Attendance: 75,000; Referee: Florian Badstübner

18 March 2023 25	FC Augsburg	1–1	Schalke 04	Augsburg
15:30 CET (UTC+1)	Maier 51'; Demirović (red card) 53'; Vargas (yellow card) 62'; Gikiewicz (yellow card) 78'; Cardona (yellow card) 90+2'; Gouweleeuw (yellow card) 90+2'	Report	Balanta (yellow card) 5'; Král (yellow card) 12'; Jenz (yellow card) 63'; Frey (yellow card) 90+3'; Bülter 90+3' (pen.)	Stadium: WWK Arena; Attendance: 30,660; Referee: Daniel Schlager

1 April 2023 26	VfL Wolfsburg	2–2	FC Augsburg	Wolfsburg
15:30 CEST (UTC+2)	Arnold (penalty missed) 21'; Baku (yellow card) 51'; Wimmer (yellow card) 56'; Waldschmidt 84'; Paredes (yellow card) 90+3'; F. Nmecha 90+6'	Report	Arnold 2' (o.g.); Berisha 32'; Valentin (yellow card) 87'; Maier (yellow card) 90+4'	Stadium: Volkswagen Arena; Attendance: 22,107; Referee: Martin Petersen

8 April 2023 27	FC Augsburg	1–3	1. FC Köln	Augsburg
15:30 CEST (UTC+2)	Vargas (yellow card) 6', (goal) 29'; Iago (yellow card) 45'; Engels (yellow card) 56'	Report	Skhiri 7', (yellow card) 84'; Martel 16', (yellow card) 25'; Schindler (yellow card) 27'; Maina 59'; Hübers (yellow card) 72'	Stadium: WWK Arena; Attendance: 30,660; Referee: Robert Schröder

15 April 2023 28	RB Leipzig	3–2	FC Augsburg	Leipzig
15:30 CEST (UTC+2)	Kampl 10'; Werner 32', 35'; Raum (yellow card) 74'; Silva (yellow card) 90'	Report	Maier 5'; Uduokhai (yellow card) 48'; Iago (yellow card) 48'; Gouweleeuw (yellow card) 63'; Vargas 82'	Stadium: Red Bull Arena; Attendance: 46,058; Referee: Marco Fritz

21 April 2023 29	FC Augsburg	1–1	VfB Stuttgart	Augsburg
20:30 CEST (UTC+2)	Beljo 8'; Bauer (yellow card) 62'; Rexhbeçaj (yellow card) 78'; Uduokhai (yellow card) 85'; Baumgartlinger (yellow card) 89'; Maier (yellow card) 90+1'	Report	Ito (yellow card) 20'; Coulibaly (yellow card) 52'; Vagnoman (yellow card) 70'; Endo 78'	Stadium: WWK Arena; Attendance: 30,660; Referee: Christian Dingert

29 April 2023 30	Eintracht Frankfurt	1–1	FC Augsburg	Frankfurt
15:30 CEST (UTC+2)	Rexhbecaj 25' (o.g.); Dina Embimbe (yellow card) 61'; Tuta (yellow card) 79'	Report	Veiga (yellow card) 20'; Demirović 58', (yellow card) 61'	Stadium: Deutsche Bank Park; Attendance: 48,000; Referee: Frank Willenborg

6 May 2023 31	FC Augsburg	1–0	Union Berlin	Augsburg
15:30 CEST (UTC+2)	Engels (yellow card) 11'; Gouweleeuw (yellow card) 19'; Beljo 53'	Report	Laïdouni (yellow card) 64'; Jaeckel (yellow card) 72'	Stadium: WWK Arena; Attendance: 30,660; Referee: Florian Badstübner

13 May 2023 32	VfL Bochum	3–2	FC Augsburg	Bochum
15:30 CEST (UTC+2)	Antwi-Adjei 2'; Stafylidis (yellow card) 4'; Hofmann (yellow card) 50'; Gouweleeuw 59' (o.g.); Losilla 62'; Riemann (yellow card) 90+3'	Report	Meier 29'; Bauer (yellow card) 32'; Gumny (yellow card) 76'; Yeboah 85'	Stadium: Vonovia Ruhrstadion; Attendance: 24,453; Referee: Patrick Ittrich

21 May 2023 33	FC Augsburg	0–3	Borussia Dortmund	Augsburg
17:30 CEST (UTC+2)	Uduokhai (red card) 38'; Beljo (yellow card) 43'; Gouweleeuw (yellow card) 69'; Demirović (yellow card) 73'	Report	Can (yellow card) 47'; Haller 58', 84'; Adeyemi (yellow card) 69'; Wolf (yellow card) 74'; Brandt 90+3'	Stadium: WWK Arena; Attendance: 30,660; Referee: Tobias Welz

27 May 2023 34	Borussia Mönchengladbach	2–0	FC Augsburg	Mönchengladbach
15:30 CEST (UTC+2)	Netz 4'; Hofmann 40'	Report	Gumny (red card) 45+3'; Valentin (yellow card) 67'	Stadium: Borussia-Park; Attendance: 52,186; Referee: Matthias Jöllenbeck

=== DFB-Pokal ===
31 July 2022 First round	Blau-Weiß Lohne	0–4	FC Augsburg	Lohne
15:31 CEST (UTC+2)	Beermann (yellow card) 19'	Report	Maier 51'; Gouweleeuw (yellow card) 64'; Jensen 69'; Niederlechner 81'; Malone 89'	Stadium: Heinz-Dettmer-Stadion; Attendance: 5,000; Referee: Sven Waschitzki-Günther

19 October 2022 Second round	FC Augsburg	2–5	Bayern Munich	Augsburg
20:45 CEST (UTC+2)	Valentin 9', (yellow card) 78'; Upamecano 65' (o.g.); Gouweleeuw (yellow card) 79'	Report	Choupo-Moting 27', 59'; Kimmich 53'; Musiala 74'; Davies 90+1'	Stadium: WWK Arena; Attendance: 30,660; Referee: Bastian Dankert

== Statistics ==
=== Appearances and goals ===
No.	Pos	Nat	Player	Total		Bundesliga		DFB-Pokal	
No.	Pos	Nat	Player	Apps	Goals	Apps	Goals	Apps	Goals
Goalkeepers
1	GK	(Poland) POL	Rafał Gikiewicz	21	0	20	0	1	0
25	GK	(Germany) GER	Daniel Klein	0	0	0	0	0	0
39	GK	(Germany) GER	Benjamin Leneis	0	0	0	0	0	0
40	GK	(Czech Republic) CZE	Tomáš Koubek	5	0	4	0	1	0
Defenders
2	DF	(Poland) POL	Robert Gumny	21	1	18+2	1	1	0
3	DF	(Denmark) DEN	Mads Valentin	20	1	13+6	0	1	1
4	DF	(England) ENG	Reece Oxford	3	0	1+2	0	0	0
6	DF	(Netherlands) NED	Jeffrey Gouweleeuw	25	0	23	0	2	0
19	DF	(Germany) GER	Felix Uduokhai	14	0	10+3	0	1	0
22	DF	(Brazil) BRA	Iago	18	0	14+2	0	2	0
23	DF	(Germany) GER	Maximilian Bauer	21	0	13+6	0	2	0
38	DF	(Croatia) CRO	David Čolina	3	1	0+3	1	0	0
42	DF	(Germany) GER	Aaron Zehnter	2	0	0+1	0	0+1	0
Midfielders
5	MF	(Germany) GER	Tobias Strobl	0	0	0	0	0	0
8	MF	(Portugal) POR	Renato Veiga	4	0	4	0	0	0
10	MF	(Germany) GER	Arne Maier	22	3	15+5	2	1+1	1
13	MF	(Germany) GER	Elvis Rexhbeçaj	23	0	20+1	0	2	0
14	MF	(Austria) AUT	Julian Baumgartlinger	12	0	3+8	0	0+1	0
16	MF	(Switzerland) SUI	Ruben Vargas	16	1	7+8	1	1	0
17	MF	(Nigeria) NGR	Noah Sarenren Bazee	1	0	0+1	0	0	0
20	MF	(Germany) GER	Daniel Caligiuri	14	1	2+10	1	1+1	0
24	MF	(Finland) FIN	Fredrik Jensen	18	3	7+10	2	0+1	1
27	MF	(Belgium) BEL	Arne Engels	9	0	9	0	0	0
28	MF	(Germany) GER	André Hahn	8	2	4+3	2	1	0
30	MF	(Germany) GER	Niklas Dorsch	6	0	2+4	0	0	0
Forwards
7	FW	(Croatia) CRO	Dion Beljo	8	1	7+1	1	0	0
9	FW	(Bosnia and Herzegovina) BIH	Ermedin Demirović	25	7	23	7	2	0
11	FW	(Germany) GER	Mërgim Berisha	18	8	17+1	8	0	0
34	FW	(France) FRA	Nathanaël Mbuku	1	0	0+1	0	0	0
45	FW	(Italy) ITA	Kelvin Yeboah	8	0	2+6	0	0	0
48	FW	(France) FRA	Irvin Cardona	2	1	0+2	1	0	0
Players transferred out during the season
7	FW	(Germany) GER	Florian Niederlechner	16	5	10+4	4	1+1	1
8	MF	(Ecuador) ECU	Carlos Gruezo	15	0	12+1	0	2	0
18	FW	(United States) USA	Ricardo Pepi	5	0	1+3	0	0+1	0
21	FW	(Germany) GER	Lukas Petkov	8	0	0+7	0	0+1	0
26	DF	(Denmark) DEN	Frederik Winther	1	0	1	0	0	0
29	FW	(Germany) GER	Lasse Günther	0	0	0	0	0	0
31	DF	(Germany) GER	Felix Götze	0	0	0	0	0	0
32	DF	(Germany) GER	Raphael Framberger	4	0	2+1	0	0+1	0
33	FW	(Venezuela) VEN	Sergio Córdova	0	0	0	0	0	0
37	FW	(Germany) GER	Maurice Malone	1	1	0	0	0+1	1
44	FW	(Germany) GER	Henri Koudossou	0	0	0	0	0	0

Last updated: 11 March 2023
Source: Competitions

=== Goalscorers ===
Rank	Pos	No.	Nat	Name	Bundesliga	DFB-Pokal	Total
1	FW	11	(Germany)	Mërgim Berisha	8	0	8
2	FW	9	(Bosnia and Herzegovina)	Ermedin Demirović	7	0	7
3	FW	7	(Germany)	Florian Niederlechner	4	1	5
4	MF	10	(Germany)	Arne Maier	2	1	3
4	MF	24	(Finland)	Fredrik Jensen	2	1	3
6	MF	28	(Germany)	André Hahn	2	0	2
7	FW	2	(Poland)	Robert Gumny	1	0	1
7	DF	3	(Denmark)	Mads Valentin	0	1	1
7	FW	7	(Croatia)	Dion Beljo	1	0	1
7	MF	16	(Switzerland)	Ruben Vargas	1	0	1
7	MF	20	(Germany)	Daniel Caligiuri	1	0	1
7	FW	37	(Germany)	Maurice Malone	0	1	1
7	DF	38	(Croatia)	David Čolina	1	0	1
7	FW	48	(France)	Irvin Cardona	1	0	1
Own goals					0	1	1
Totals					31	6	37

Last updated: 11 March 2023
