= 2021–22 FC Augsburg season =

FC Augsburg
2021–22 season
- Chairman: Klaus Hofmann
- Head coach: Markus Weinzierl
- Stadium: WWK Arena
- Bundesliga: 14th
- DFB-Pokal: Second round
- Top goalscorer: League: Michael Gregoritsch (9); All: Michael Gregoritsch (9)
Home colours	Away colours	Third colours

The 2021–22 season was the 115th season in the existence of FC Augsburg and the club's 11th consecutive season in the top flight of German football. In addition to the domestic league, FC Augsburg participated in this season's edition of the DFB-Pokal.

== Players ==
=== First-team squad ===
As of 3 February 2022

Note: Flags indicate national team as defined under FIFA eligibility rules; some limited exceptions apply. Players may hold more than one non-FIFA nationality.

No.	Pos.	Nation	Player
1	GK	POL	Rafał Gikiewicz
2	DF	POL	Robert Gumny
3	DF	DEN	Mads Valentin
4	MF	ENG	Reece Oxford
5	MF	GER	Tobias Strobl
6	DF	NED	Jeffrey Gouweleeuw (captain)
7	FW	GER	Florian Niederlechner
8	MF	ECU	Carlos Gruezo
10	MF	GER	Arne Maier (on loan from Hertha BSC)
11	FW	AUT	Michael Gregoritsch
14	MF	CZE	Jan Morávek
16	MF	SUI	Ruben Vargas
17	FW	NGR	Noah Sarenren Bazee
18	FW	USA	Ricardo Pepi

No.	Pos.	Nation	Player
19	DF	GER	Felix Uduokhai
20	MF	ITA	Daniel Caligiuri
21	FW	SUI	Andi Zeqiri (on loan from Brighton & Hove Albion)
22	DF	BRA	Iago
24	MF	FIN	Fredrik Jensen
25	GK	GER	Daniel Klein
26	DF	DEN	Frederik Winther
27	FW	ISL	Alfreð Finnbogason
28	MF	GER	André Hahn
29	FW	GER	Lasse Günther
30	MF	GER	Niklas Dorsch
32	DF	GER	Raphael Framberger
40	GK	CZE	Tomáš Koubek
41	MF	GER	Tim Civeja

=== Out on loan ===
Note: Flags indicate national team as defined under FIFA eligibility rules; some limited exceptions apply. Players may hold more than one non-FIFA nationality.

No.	Pos.	Nation	Player
—	FW	VEN	Sergio Córdova (at Real Salt Lake until 31 December 2022)
—	MF	GER	Felix Götze (at 1. FC Kaiserslautern until 30 June 2022)
—	GK	GER	Benjamin Leneis (at 1. FC Magdeburg until 30 June 2022)
—	FW	GER	Maurice Malone (at 1. FC Heidenheim until 30 June 2022)
—	FW	GER	Lukas Petkov (at SC Verl until 30 June 2022)
—	DF	CRO	Jozo Stanić (at Wehen Wiesbaden until 30 June 2022)

== Transfers ==
=== In ===
No.	Pos	Player	Transferred from	Fee	Date	Source
29	FW	(Germany) Lasse Günther	(Germany) Bayern Munich U19	Free	1 July 2021	
25	GK	(Germany) Daniel Klein	(Germany) 1899 Hoffenheim II	Free	2 July 2021	
30	MF	(Germany) Niklas Dorsch	(Belgium) K.A.A. Gent	€7,000,000	8 July 2021	
10	MF	(Germany) Arne Maier	(Germany) Hertha BSC	Loan	10 August 2021	
21	FW	(Switzerland) Andi Zeqiri	(England) Brighton & Hove Albion	Loan	30 August 2021	
18	FW	(United States) Ricardo Pepi	(United States) FC Dallas	€17,600,000	3 January 2022	

=== Out ===
No.	Pos	Player	Transferred to	Fee	Date	Source
5	DF	(Czech Republic) Marek Suchý		Free	1 July 2021	
8	MF	(Germany) Rani Khedira	(Germany) Union Berlin	Free	1 July 2021	
	FW	(Germany) Julian Schieber	Retired		1 July 2021	
39	GK	(Germany) Benjamin Leneis	(Germany) 1. FC Magdeburg	Loan	2 July 2021	
45	FW	(Germany) Lukas Petkov	(Germany) SC Verl	Loan	2 July 2021	
4	DF	(Germany) Felix Götze	(Germany) 1. FC Kaiserslautern	Loan	7 July 2021	
15	DF	(Croatia) Jozo Stanić	(Germany) SV Wehen Wiesbaden	Loan	13 July 2021	
38	DF	(Austria) Kevin Danso	(France) Lens	€5,500,000	6 August 2021	
23	FW	(Germany) Marco Richter	(Germany) Hertha BSC	€7,100,000	10 August 2021	
37	FW	(Germany) Maurice Malone	(Germany) 1. FC Heidenheim	Loan	30 August 2021	
9	FW	(Venezuela) Sergio Córdova	(United States) Real Salt Lake	Loan	3 February 2022	

== Pre-season and friendlies ==
Win Draw Loss

7 July 2021 Friendly	FC Augsburg	2–2	Hamburger SV	Kirchheim bei München, Germany
13:30 CEST (UTC+2)	Danso 19'; Hahn 24'	Report	Wintzheimer 23', 26'	Stadium: Sportanlage Heimstetten

15 July 2021 Friendly	Qarabağ	2–2	FC Augsburg	Kufstein, Austria
18:00 CEST (UTC+2)	Andrade 26'; Romero 28'	Report	Gouweleeuw 37' (pen.); Niederlechner 45'	Stadium: Kufstein Arena

16 July 2021 Friendly	FC Augsburg	Cancelled	FC Ingolstadt 04	Kufstein, Austria
15:30 CEST (UTC+2)				Stadium: Kufstein Arena

21 July 2021 Friendly	Paris Saint-Germain	2–1	FC Augsburg	Orléans, France
19:00 CEST (UTC+2)	Kehrer (yellow card) 55'; Draxler 62'; Gouweleeuw 90+1' (o.g.)	Report	Dorsch (yellow card) 37'; Niederlechner 66'	Stadium: Stade de la Source; Referee: Mikael Lesage

28 July 2021 Friendly	FC Augsburg	Cancelled	Greuther Fürth	Augsburg, Germany
11:00 CEST (UTC+2)		Report		Stadium: WWK Arena

31 July 2021 Friendly	FC Augsburg	3–1	Cagliari	Augsburg, Germany
15:30 CEST (UTC+2)	Vargas 17', 40'; Jensen 37'; Gregoritsch (yellow card) 78'; Dell'Erba (yellow card) 87'	Report	João Pedro (yellow card) 16', (goal) 82'; Dalbert (yellow card) 25'; Strootman (yellow card) 41'	Stadium: WWK Arena; Attendance: 4,500; Referee: Michael Bacher

7 October 2021 Friendly	FC Augsburg	1–0	Jahn Regensburg	Augsburg, Germany
16:00 CEST (UTC+2)	Sarenren Bazee 67'	Report		Stadium: WWK Arena

27 January 2022 Friendly	FC Augsburg	3–3	Jahn Regensburg	Augsburg, Germany
14:00 CET (UTC+1)	Niederlechner 12'; Vargas 26'; Gregoritsch 69'	Report	Makridis 10', 35'; Yıldırım (yellow card) 45'; Caliskaner 89'	Stadium: WWK Arena; Attendance: 0

== Competitions ==
=== Overall record ===
Competition	First match	Last match	Starting round	Final position	Record							
Competition	First match	Last match	Starting round	Final position	Pld	W	D	L	GF	GA	GD	Win %
Bundesliga	13 August 2021	14 May 2022	Matchday 1	14th	34	10	8	16	39	56	−17	29.41
DFB-Pokal	7 August 2021	27 October 2021	First round	Second round	2	1	1	0	6	4	+2	50.00
Total					36	11	9	16	45	60	−15	30.56

Source: Soccerway

=== Bundesliga ===
==== League table ====
Pos	Team	Pld	W	D	L	GF	GA	GD	Pts	Qualification or relegation
12	VfL Wolfsburg	34	12	6	16	43	54	−11	42	
13	VfL Bochum	34	12	6	16	38	52	−14	42	
14	FC Augsburg	34	10	8	16	39	56	−17	38	
15	VfB Stuttgart	34	7	12	15	41	59	−18	33	
16	Hertha BSC (O)	34	9	6	19	37	71	−34	33	Qualification for the relegation play-offs

Source: DFB
Rules for classification: 1) Points; 2) Goal difference; 3) Goals scored; 4) Head-to-head results; 5) Head-to-head away goals scored; 6) Away goals scored; 7) Play-off.
(O) Play-off winners

==== Results summary ====
Overall								Home						Away					
Pld	W	D	L	GF	GA	GD	Pts	W	D	L	GF	GA	GD	W	D	L	GF	GA	GD
34	10	8	16	39	56	−17	38	7	4	6	25	26	−1	3	4	10	14	30	−16

Source: DFB

==== Results by round ====
Round	1	2	3	4	5	6	7	8	9	10	11	12	13	14	15	16	17	18	19	20	21	22	23	24	25	26	27	28	29	30	31	32	33	34
Ground	H	A	H	A	H	A	A	H	A	H	A	H	A	H	A	H	A	A	H	A	H	A	H	H	A	H	A	H	A	H	A	H	A	H
Result	L	D	L	D	W	L	L	D	L	W	L	W	D	L	W	D	D	L	D	L	W	L	L	D	W	W	L	W	L	L	W	L	L	W
Position	18	17	17	17	11	15	15	16	16	16	16	15	16	16	16	16	15	16	15	16	16	16	16	15	14	14	15	13	14	14	14	14	14	14

Source: DFB
A = Away; H = Home; W = Win; D = Draw; L = Loss

==== Matches ====
The league fixtures were announced on 25 June 2021.

14 August 2021 1	FC Augsburg	0–4	1899 Hoffenheim	Augsburg
15:30 CEST (UTC+2)	Gouweleeuw (yellow card) 89'	Report	Raum (yellow card) 19'; Bruun Larsen 37'; Rudy (yellow card) 62', (goal) 90+5'; Adamyan 79'; Rutter 87'	Stadium: WWK Arena; Attendance: 9,124; Referee: Felix Brych

21 August 2021 2	Eintracht Frankfurt	0–0	FC Augsburg	Frankfurt
15:30 CEST (UTC+2)	Borré (yellow card) 19'; Sow (yellow card) 67'; Lenz (yellow card) 87'	Report	Framberger (yellow card) 9'; Gumny (yellow card) 49'; Gruezo (yellow card) 55'	Stadium: Deutsche Bank Park; Attendance: 22,000; Referee: Harm Osmers

28 August 2021 3	FC Augsburg	1–4	Bayer Leverkusen	Augsburg
15:30 CEST (UTC+2)	Niederlechner 30'	Report	Iago 3' (o.g.); Niederlechner 14' (o.g.); Demirbay (yellow card) 66'; Schick 75'; Wirtz 81'	Stadium: WWK Arena; Attendance: 10,582; Referee: Benjamin Brand

11 September 2021 4	Union Berlin	0–0	FC Augsburg	Berlin
15:30 CEST (UTC+2)	Khedira (yellow card) 41'	Report	Oxford (yellow card) 36'; Dorsch (yellow card) 86'	Stadium: Stadion An der Alten Försterei; Attendance: 10,207; Referee: Martin Petersen

18 September 2021 5	FC Augsburg	1–0	Borussia Mönchengladbach	Augsburg
15:30 CEST (UTC+2)	Hahn (yellow card) 31'; Niederlechner 80'	Report	Beyer (yellow card) 41'; Zakaria (yellow card) 90+3'	Stadium: WWK Arena; Attendance: 12,500; Referee: Florian Badstübner

26 September 2021 6	SC Freiburg	3–0	FC Augsburg	Freiburg
17:30 CEST (UTC+2)	Kübler 6'; Höler 25'; Grifo 33' (pen.)	Report	Gouweleeuw (yellow card) 73'	Stadium: Schwarzwald-Stadion; Attendance: 14,400; Referee: Daniel Schlager

2 October 2021 7	Borussia Dortmund	2–1	FC Augsburg	Dortmund
15:30 CEST (UTC+2)	Guerreiro 10' (pen.); Reus (yellow card) 44'; Brandt 51'	Report	Gruezo (yellow card) 13'; Oxford (yellow card) 15'; Zeqiri 35', (yellow card) 53'	Stadium: Signal Iduna Park; Attendance: 41,000; Referee: Tobias Welz

17 October 2021 8	FC Augsburg	1–1	Arminia Bielefeld	Augsburg
17:30 CEST (UTC+2)	Oxford 19'; Vargas (yellow card) 50'; Hahn (yellow card) 74'; Córdova (yellow card) 86'	Report	Wimmer (yellow card) 27'; Laursen 77'	Stadium: WWK Arena; Attendance: 17,500; Referee: Robert Schröder

22 October 2021 9	Mainz 05	4–1	FC Augsburg	Mainz
20:30 CEST (UTC+2)	Onisiwo 10'; Bell 15'; Burkardt 26', 71'; Martín (yellow card) 70'	Report	Oxford (yellow card) 8'; Gouweleeuw (yellow card) 63'; Vargas (yellow card) 66'; Zeqiri 69'	Stadium: Opel Arena; Attendance: 19,400; Referee: Robert Hartmann

31 October 2021 10	FC Augsburg	4–1	VfB Stuttgart	Augsburg
15:30 CET (UTC+1)	Gouweleeuw (yellow card) 21', (goal) 52'; Oxford 30'; Caligiuri (yellow card) 32'; Niederlechner 72'; Finnbogason 81'; Gruezo (yellow card) 90+3'	Report	Führich 7'; Didavi (yellow card) 39'; Coulibaly (yellow card) 59'; Al Ghaddioui (yellow card) 77'; Förster (yellow card) 90+2'	Stadium: WWK Arena; Attendance: 17,500; Referee: Patrick Ittrich

6 November 2021 11	VfL Wolfsburg	1–0	FC Augsburg	Wolfsburg
15:30 CET (UTC+1)	L. Nmecha 14'; Guilavogui (yellow card) 86'; F. Nmecha (yellow card) 90+2'	Report	Strobl (yellow card) 39'; Oxford (yellow card) 87'; Valentin (yellow card) 90+4'	Stadium: Volkswagen Arena; Attendance: 16,095; Referee: Marco Fritz

19 November 2021 12	FC Augsburg	2–1	Bayern Munich	Augsburg
20:30 CET (UTC+1)	Valentin 23'; Hahn 36', (yellow card) 45'; Framberger (yellow card) 79'	Report	Lewandowski 38'; Hernandez (yellow card) 45+1'	Stadium: WWK Arena; Attendance: 26,000; Referee: Daniel Siebert

27 November 2021 13	Hertha BSC	1–1	FC Augsburg	Berlin
15:30 CET (UTC+1)	Richter 40', (yellow card) 42'; Jovetić (yellow card) 90+6'	Report	Vargas (yellow card) 31'; Hahn (yellow card) 81'; Iago (yellow card) 90+6'; Gregoritsch 90+7'	Stadium: Olympiastadion; Attendance: 14,523; Referee: Frank Willenborg

4 December 2021 14	FC Augsburg	2–3	VfL Bochum	Augsburg
15:30 CET (UTC+1)	Gregoritsch 58'; Caligiuri 86' (pen.)	Report	Polter 23', 45+2'; Soares (yellow card) 36'; Holtmann 40'; Rexhbeçaj (yellow card) 87'	Stadium: WWK Arena; Attendance: 0 Referee: Deniz Aytekin

10 December 2021 15	1. FC Köln	0–2	FC Augsburg	Cologne
20:30 CET (UTC+1)	Kilian (yellow card) 57'; Özcan (yellow card) 87'	Report	Gregoritsch (yellow card) 25'; Dorsch (yellow card) 41', (goal) 88'; Gouweleeuw (yellow card) 57'; Hahn 72'; Córdova (yellow card) 86'	Stadium: RheinEnergieStadion; Attendance: 15,000; Referee: Patrick Ittrich

15 December 2021 16	FC Augsburg	1–1	RB Leipzig	Augsburg
20:30 CET (UTC+1)	Dorsch (yellow card) 44'; Caligiuri 86' (pen.); Bazee (yellow card) 87'	Report	Silva 19'	Stadium: WWK Arena; Referee: Florian Badstübner

18 December 2021 17	Greuther Fürth	0–0	FC Augsburg	Fürth
15:30 CET (UTC+1)	Willems (yellow card) 77'; Abiama (yellow card) 90'	Report	Caligiuri (yellow card) 38'; Oxford (yellow card) 64'; Iago (yellow card) 84'	Stadium: Sportpark Ronhof; Attendance: 0 Referee: Sascha Stegemann

8 January 2022 18	1899 Hoffenheim	3–1	FC Augsburg	Sinsheim
15:30 CET (UTC+1)	Bebou 38', 44'; Baumgartner (yellow card) 75'; Raum 90+3'	Report	Gregoritsch 5'	Stadium: Rhein-Neckar-Arena; Attendance: 500; Referee: Benjamin Cortus

16 January 2022 19	FC Augsburg	1–1	Eintracht Frankfurt	Augsburg
15:30 CET (UTC+1)	Gregoritsch (yellow card) 15', (goal) 38'; Zeqiri (yellow card) 36'; Niederlechner (yellow card) 73'	Report	Kamada 22'; Chandler (yellow card) 40'; Touré (yellow card) 49'; Tuta (yellow card) 90'	Stadium: WWK Arena; Attendance: 0 Referee: Sven Jablonski

22 January 2022 20	Bayer Leverkusen	5–1	FC Augsburg	Leverkusen
15:30 CET (UTC+1)	Bellarabi (yellow card) 6', (goal) 9'; Diaby 24', 65', 69'; Alario 81'	Report	Valentin (yellow card) 43'; Uduokhai (yellow card) 52'; Maier 62'	Stadium: BayArena; Attendance: 750; Referee: Daniel Schlager

5 February 2022 21	FC Augsburg	2–0	Union Berlin	Augsburg
15:30 CET (UTC+1)	Gregoritsch 16'; Hahn 59'	Report	Khedira (yellow card) 42'; Voglsammer (yellow card) 60'	Stadium: WWK Arena; Attendance: 7,600; Referee: Harm Osmers

12 February 2022 22	Borussia Mönchengladbach	3–2	FC Augsburg	Mönchengladbach
15:30 CET (UTC+1)	Pléa (yellow card) 9'; Koné 30'; Hofmann 46'; Bensebaini 67'; Elvedi (yellow card) 84'	Report	Iago 55', (yellow card) 59'; Dorsch (yellow card) 90'; Finnbogason 90+3'	Stadium: Borussia-Park; Attendance: 10,000; Referee: Tobias Welz

19 February 2022 23	FC Augsburg	1–2	SC Freiburg	Augsburg
15:30 CET (UTC+1)	Gregoritsch 16'; Hahn (yellow card) 63'	Report	Petersen 4'; Schlotterbeck 26', (yellow card) 75'	Stadium: WWK Arena; Attendance: 15,000; Referee: Daniel Siebert

27 February 2022 24	FC Augsburg	1–1	Borussia Dortmund	Augsburg
17:30 CET (UTC+1)	Vargas (yellow card) 19'; Dorsch (yellow card) 47'; Sarenren Bazee 78'	Report	Hazard 35'; Bellingham (yellow card) 87'	Stadium: WWK Arena; Attendance: 15,330; Referee: Deniz Aytekin

4 March 2022 25	Arminia Bielefeld	0–1	FC Augsburg	Bielefeld
20:30 CET (UTC+1)	Vasiliadis (yellow card) 45+4'; Klos (yellow card) 54'; Brunner (yellow card) 75'	Report	Caligiuri (yellow card) 21', (goal) 50'; Gruezo (yellow card) 26'; Gregoritsch (yellow card) 73'; Valentin (yellow card) 78'; Morávek (yellow card) 90+1'	Stadium: Bielefelder Alm; Attendance: 19,460; Referee: Felix Brych

19 March 2022 27	VfB Stuttgart	3–2	FC Augsburg	Stuttgart
15:30 CET (UTC+1)	Anton 44'; Marmoush 79'; Tomás (yellow card) 80', (goal) 85'; Führich (yellow card) 90+2'	Report	Hahn 6'; Gregoritsch 45+1'; Valentin (yellow card) 78'; Uduokhai (yellow card) 79'; Winther (yellow card) 81'	Stadium: Mercedes-Benz Arena; Attendance: 55,785; Referee: Patrick Ittrich

3 April 2022 28	FC Augsburg	3–0	VfL Wolfsburg	Augsburg
15:30 CEST (UTC+2)	Iago 1'; Dorsch (yellow card) 3'; Niederlechner 62'; Valentin 69'	Report		Stadium: WWK Arena; Attendance: 23,143; Referee: Sascha Stegemann

6 April 2022 26	FC Augsburg	2–1	Mainz 05	Augsburg
18:30 CEST (UTC+2)	Gouweleeuw 11' (pen.), (yellow card) 76'; Vargas 56'; Gruezo (yellow card) 75'; Gumny (yellow card) 80'	Report	Bell (yellow card) 15'; Widmer 54', (yellow card) 83'	Stadium: WWK Arena; Attendance: 18,122; Referee: Matthias Jöllenbeck
Note: The match was originally scheduled for 12 March 2022, but was postponed due to a COVID-19 outbreak in Mainz 05's squad.

9 April 2022 29	Bayern Munich	1–0	FC Augsburg	Munich
15:30 CEST (UTC+2)	Nianzou (yellow card) 68'; Lewandowski 82' (pen.)	Report	Oxford (yellow card) 36'; Dorsch (yellow card) 90+2'	Stadium: Allianz Arena; Attendance: 75,000; Referee: Patrick Ittrich

16 April 2022 30	FC Augsburg	0–1	Hertha BSC	Augsburg
15:30 CEST (UTC+2)	Oxford (yellow card) 26'; Gumny (yellow card) 52'; Framberger (yellow card) 90'; Gouweleeuw (yellow card) 90+6'	Report	Selke (yellow card) 26'; Boateng (yellow card) 29'; Boyata (yellow card) 34'; Serdar 49'; Richter (yellow card) 64'	Stadium: WWK Arena; Attendance: 28,533; Referee: Marco Fritz

24 April 2022 31	VfL Bochum	0–2	FC Augsburg	Bochum
15:30 CEST (UTC+2)	Gamboa (yellow card) 90+6'	Report	Hahn 15'; Gregoritsch 43' (pen.); Dorsch (yellow card) 47'; Valentin (yellow card) 84'; Gouweleeuw (yellow card) 90+6'	Stadium: Vonovia Ruhrstadion; Attendance: 23,500; Referee: Bastian Dankert

30 April 2022 32	FC Augsburg	1–4	1. FC Köln	Augsburg
15:30 CEST (UTC+2)	Gruezo (yellow card) 42'; Oxford (yellow card) 69'; Niederlechner 73'	Report	Thielmann 12', (yellow card) 53'; Uth 15'; Kainz (yellow card) 60'; Modeste 63' (pen.), 78'; Hübers (yellow card) 75'; Kilian (yellow card) 80'	Stadium: WWK Arena; Attendance: 29,511; Referee: Robert Schröder

8 May 2022 33	RB Leipzig	4–0	FC Augsburg	Leipzig
19:30 CEST (UTC+2)	Forsberg (yellow card) 36', (goal) 64' (pen.); Silva 40'; Nkunku 48', 57'	Report	Gouweleeuw (yellow card) 73'; Günther (yellow card) 77'	Stadium: Red Bull Arena; Attendance: 37,029; Referee: Bastian Dankert

14 May 2022 34	FC Augsburg	2–1	Greuther Fürth	Augsburg
15:30 CEST (UTC+2)	Caligiuri 11' (pen.), (yellow card) 90+1'; Gregoritsch 84'; Gruezo (yellow card) 90+5'	Report	Christiansen (yellow card) 2'; Ngankam 23'; Griesbeck (yellow card) 43'; Asta (yellow card) 75'	Stadium: WWK Arena; Attendance: 27,907; Referee: Tobias Reichel

=== DFB-Pokal ===
7 August 2021 First round	Greifswalder SV 04	2–4	FC Augsburg	Greifswald
15:30 CEST (UTC+2)	Knechtel 2', (yellow card) 45'; Jovanović 69'	Report	Winther 41', (yellow card) 45+4'; Niederlechner 52'; Jensen 68'; Hahn 80'	Stadium: Volksstadion Greifswald; Attendance: 4,000; Referee: Max Burda

27 October 2021 Second round	VfL Bochum	2–2 (a.e.t.) (5–4 p)	FC Augsburg	Bochum
18:30 CEST (UTC+2)	Pantović 12', 53'; Polter (yellow card) 105'	Report	Strobl (yellow card) 48'; Oxford 56'; Hahn (yellow card) 57'; Vargas 58'; Zeqiri (yellow card) 65'; Gregoritsch (yellow card) 92'	Stadium: Vonovia Ruhrstadion; Attendance: 15,220; Referee: Martin Petersen
	Penalties
	Rexhbeçaj (penalty scored); Mašović (penalty scored); Blum (penalty scored); Polter (penalty scored); Riemann (penalty scored)		(penalty scored) Gouweleeuw; (penalty scored) Finnbogason; (penalty scored) Strobl; (penalty scored) Gregoritsch; (penalty missed) Maier

== Statistics ==
=== Appearances and goals ===
No.	Pos	Nat	Player	Total		Bundesliga		DFB-Pokal	
No.	Pos	Nat	Player	Apps	Goals	Apps	Goals	Apps	Goals
Goalkeepers
1	GK	(Poland) POL	Rafał Gikiewicz	36	0	34	0	2	0
25	GK	(Germany) GER	Daniel Klein	0	0	0	0	0	0
40	GK	(Czech Republic) CZE	Tomáš Koubek	0	0	0	0	0	0
Defenders
2	DF	(Poland) POL	Robert Gumny	30	0	27+1	0	1+1	0
3	DF	(Denmark) DEN	Mads Valentin	29	2	15+14	2	0	0
6	DF	(Netherlands) NED	Jeffrey Gouweleeuw	30	2	29	2	1	0
19	DF	(Germany) GER	Felix Uduokhai	13	0	8+4	0	1	0
22	DF	(Brazil) BRA	Iago	31	2	26+3	2	2	0
26	DF	(Denmark) DEN	Frederik Winther	5	1	3+1	0	1	1
32	DF	(Germany) GER	Raphael Framberger	24	0	9+14	0	1	0
Midfielders
4	MF	(England) ENG	Reece Oxford	31	3	30	2	1	1
5	MF	(Germany) GER	Tobias Strobl	6	0	4+1	0	1	0
8	MF	(Ecuador) ECU	Carlos Gruezo	18	0	9+8	0	0+1	0
10	MF	(Germany) GER	Arne Maier	30	1	21+8	1	1	0
14	MF	(Czech Republic) CZE	Jan Morávek	18	0	5+12	0	1	0
16	MF	(Switzerland) SUI	Ruben Vargas	30	2	26+3	1	1	1
20	MF	(Germany) GER	Daniel Caligiuri	29	4	24+4	4	1	0
24	MF	(Finland) FIN	Fredrik Jensen	13	1	2+10	0	1	1
28	MF	(Germany) GER	André Hahn	34	6	25+7	5	2	1
30	MF	(Germany) GER	Niklas Dorsch	31	1	27+3	1	1	0
41	MF	(Germany) GER	Tim Civeja	0	0	0	0	0	0
Forwards
7	FW	(Germany) GER	Florian Niederlechner	27	6	13+13	5	1	1
11	FW	(Austria) AUT	Michael Gregoritsch	27	9	15+10	9	0+2	0
17	FW	(Nigeria) NGR	Noah Sarenren Bazee	15	1	1+13	1	0+1	0
18	FW	(United States) USA	Ricardo Pepi	11	0	4+7	0	0	0
21	FW	(Switzerland) SUI	Andi Zeqiri	23	2	11+11	2	1	0
27	FW	(Iceland) ISL	Alfreð Finnbogason	12	2	3+7	2	1+1	0
29	FW	(Germany) GER	Lasse Günther	7	0	1+4	0	0+2	0
Players transferred out during the season
9	FW	(Venezuela) VEN	Sergio Córdova	14	0	2+11	0	0+1	0
23	MF	(Germany) GER	Marco Richter	0	0	0	0	0	0
37	FW	(Germany) GER	Maurice Malone	1	0	0	0	0+1	0

Last updated: 14 May 2022
Source: Competitions

=== Goalscorers ===
Rank	Pos	No.	Nat	Name	Bundesliga	DFB-Pokal	Total
1	FW	11	(Austria)	Michael Gregoritsch	9	0	9
2	FW	7	(Germany)	Florian Niederlechner	5	1	6
2	MF	28	(Germany)	André Hahn	5	1	6
4	MF	20	(Germany)	Daniel Caligiuri	4	0	4
5	MF	4	(England)	Reece Oxford	2	1	3
6	DF	3	(Denmark)	Mads Valentin	2	0	2
6	DF	6	(Netherlands)	Jeffrey Gouweleeuw	2	0	2
6	MF	16	(Switzerland)	Ruben Vargas	1	1	2
6	FW	21	(Switzerland)	Andi Zeqiri	2	0	2
6	DF	22	(Brazil)	Iago	2	0	2
6	FW	27	(Iceland)	Alfreð Finnbogason	2	0	2
12	MF	10	(Germany)	Arne Maier	1	0	1
12	FW	17	(Nigeria)	Noah Sarenren Bazee	1	0	1
12	MF	24	(Finland)	Fredrik Jensen	0	1	1
12	DF	26	(Denmark)	Frederik Winther	0	1	1
12	MF	30	(Germany)	Niklas Dorsch	1	0	1
Own goals					0	0	0
Totals					38	6	44

Last updated: 14 May 2022
