= Gikiewicz =

Gikiewicz is a Polish surname. Notable people with the surname include:

- Łukasz Gikiewicz (born 1987), Polish footballer
- Rafał Gikiewicz (born 1987), Polish footballer
