= Robert Gumny =

Polish footballer (born 1998)

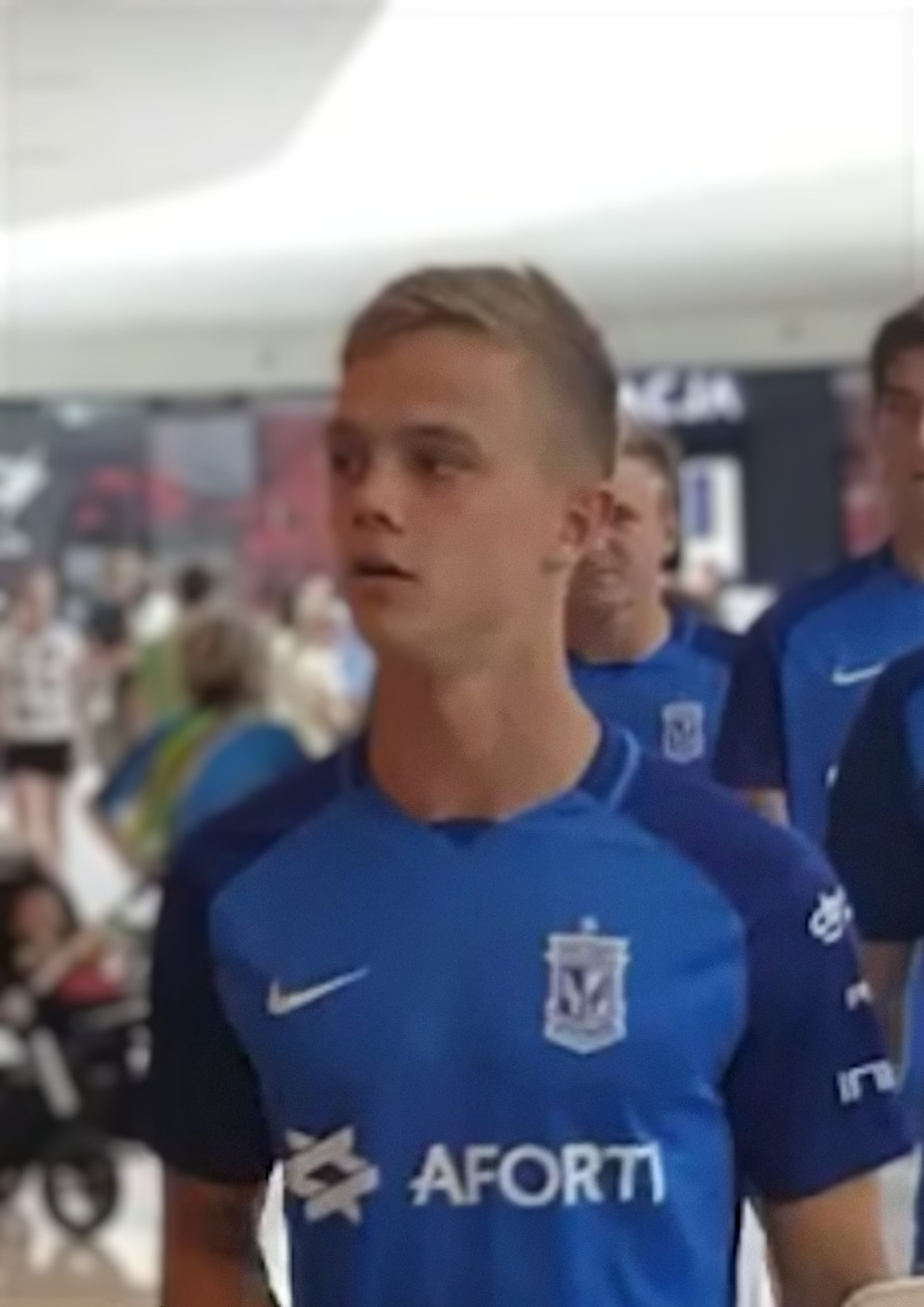
- Gumny with Lech Poznań in 2017

Personal information
- Full name: Robert Krzysztof Gumny
- Date of birth: 4 June 1998 (age 28)
- Place of birth: Poznań, Poland
- Height: 1.82 m (6 ft 0 in)
- Position: Right-back

Team information
- Current team: Lech Poznań
- Number: 20

Youth career
- –2016: Lech Poznań

Senior career*
Years	Team	Apps	(Gls)
2016–2020	Lech Poznań II	12	(1)
2016–2020	Lech Poznań	84	(2)
2016–2017	→ Podbeskidzie (loan)	14	(2)
2020–2025	FC Augsburg	101	(2)
2025–	Lech Poznań	29	(1)

International career
2015	Poland U17	4	(0)
2015–2016	Poland U18	2	(1)
2015–2017	Poland U19	15	(0)
2019–2020	Poland U21	17	(1)
2020–2023	Poland	6	(0)
- * Club domestic league appearances and goals as of 11:06, 16 November 2026 (UTC)

Robert Krzysztof Gumny (born 4 June 1998) is a Polish professional footballer who plays as a right-back for Ekstraklasa club Lech Poznań.

== Club career ==
In September 2020, Gumny joined Bundesliga club FC Augsburg on a five-year contract. The transfer fee paid to Lech Poznań was reported as €2 million plus possible bonuses. He left Augsburg at the end of his contract in June 2025.

On 1 July 2025, Gumny rejoined Lech Poznań on a two-year deal.

== International career ==
On 11 November 2020, Gumny debuted for the Polish senior squad in a friendly match against Ukraine as a starter. He was later included for the 2022 FIFA World Cup, but did not play in any match of the tournament.

== Career statistics ==
=== Club ===
As of match played 8 November 2026

Appearances and goals by club, season and competition
Club	Season	League			National cup (Note: Includes Polish Cup, DFB-Pokal)		Europe		Other		Total	
Club	Season	Division	Apps	Goals	Apps	Goals	Apps	Goals	Apps	Goals	Apps	Goals
Lech Poznań II	2015–16	III liga, gr. C	5	0	—		—		—		5	0
Lech Poznań II	2016–17	III liga, gr. II	5	0	—		—		—		5	0
Lech Poznań II	2018–19	III liga, gr. II	1	0	—		—		—		1	0
Lech Poznań II	2019–20	II liga	1	1	—		—		—		1	1
Lech Poznań II	Total		12	1	—		—		—		12	1
Lech Poznań	2015–16	Ekstraklasa	4	0	1	0	—		—		5	0
Lech Poznań	2016–17	Ekstraklasa	6	0	1	0	—		1 (Note: Appearance in Polish Super Cup)	0	8	0
Lech Poznań	2017–18	Ekstraklasa	33	0	0	0	5 (Note: Appearance(s) in UEFA Europa League)	0	—		38	0
Lech Poznań	2018–19	Ekstraklasa	19	1	1	0	0	0	—		20	1
Lech Poznań	2019–20	Ekstraklasa	21	1	2	0	—		—		23	1
Lech Poznań	2020–21	Ekstraklasa	1	0	1	0	1	0	—		3	0
Lech Poznań	Total		84	2	6	0	6	0	1	0	97	2
Podbeskidzie (loan)	2016–17	I liga	14	2	—		—		—		14	2
FC Augsburg	2020–21	Bundesliga	24	1	2	0	—		—		26	1
FC Augsburg	2021–22	Bundesliga	28	0	2	0	—		—		30	0
FC Augsburg	2022–23	Bundesliga	29	1	1	0	—		—		30	1
FC Augsburg	2023–24	Bundesliga	13	0	0	0	—		—		13	0
FC Augsburg	2024–25	Bundesliga	7	0	0	0	—		—		7	0
FC Augsburg	Total		101	2	5	0	—		—		106	2
Lech Poznań	2025–26	Ekstraklasa	21	0	1	0	8 (Note: Three appearances in UEFA Champions League, five appearances in UEFA Conference League)	0	1	0	31	0
Lech Poznań	2026–27	Ekstraklasa	8	1	0	0	7 (Note: Two appearances in UEFA Champions League, five appearances and two goals in UEFA Europa League)	2	0	0	15	3
Lech Poznań	Total		29	1	1	0	15	2	1	0	46	3
Career total			240	8	12	0	21	2	2	0	275	10

=== International ===
As of match played 24 March 2023

Appearances and goals by national team and year
National team	Year	Apps	Goals
Poland
Poland	2020	1	0
Poland	2021	1	0
Poland	2022	3	0
Poland	2023	1	0
Total		6	0

== Honours ==
Lech Poznań

- Ekstraklasa: 2025–26
- Polish Super Cup: 2016

Lech Poznań II

- III liga, group II: 2018–19

Individual

- Ekstraklasa Young Player of the Month: July 2019
