= Fredrik Jensen (footballer, born 1997) =

Finnish footballer

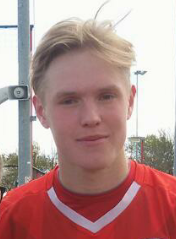
- Jensen with Twente in 2017

Personal information
- Full name: Hans Fredrik Jensen
- Date of birth: 9 September 1997 (age 29)
- Place of birth: Porvoo, Finland
- Height: 1.83 m (6 ft 0 in)
- Position: Midfielder

Team information
- Current team: Aris
- Number: 97

Youth career
- –2007: Futura
- 2008–2011: Honka
- 2012–2013: HJK
- 2013–2016: Twente

Senior career*
Years	Team	Apps	(Gls)
2016	Jong Twente	4	(1)
2016–2018	Twente	55	(9)
2018–2025	Augsburg	103	(5)
2022	→ Augsburg II	3	(1)
2025–	Aris	23	(2)

International career^{‡}
2012–2014	Finland U17	5	(0)
2012–2014	Finland U18	4	(0)
2015	Finland U19	2	(0)
2016–2017	Finland U21	7	(1)
2017–	Finland	39	(8)
- * Club domestic league appearances and goals as of 19 September 2026 ‡ National team caps and goals as of 15 November 2026

Hans Fredrik Jensen (born 9 September 1997) is a Finnish professional footballer who plays as a midfielder for the Super League Greece club Aris and the Finland national team.

Jensen began his senior club career playing for Twente, before signing with FC Augsburg at age 20 in 2018.

== Early career ==
Jensen was born in Porvoo, Finland, and started football in a youth sector of a local club Futura. In 2008 he moved to Honka in Finland, and during 2012–2013 he played in the youth academy of HJK Helsinki. In 2013 he moved to the Netherlands and joined Twente academy.

== Club career ==
Jensen began his senior career at Twente. He made his Eredivisie debut on 6 August 2016, playing the full 90 minutes of a 2–1 defeat against Excelsior.

Jensen signed with Augsburg at age 20 in 2018, on a five-year deal, for a transfer fee of €3 million. He made his Bundesliga debut on 27 October 2018, when he came in as a substitute for Koo Ja-cheol on 68th minute in a 2–1 win against Hannover.

On 20 January 2023, Jensen renewed his contract with Augsburg, signing a new deal until the end of June 2025.

After a long run of minor injuries and other absences, Jensen returned to the starting line-up in the Bundesliga match on 22 October 2023, and recorded three assists for Augsburg in a 5–2 away win against Heidenheim.

On 11 July 2025, Jensen left Augsburg and signed with Super League Greece club Aris on a three-year deal.

== International career ==
Jensen made his debut for Finland on 28 March 2017 at the age of 19 in a 1–1 friendly draw over Austria, scoring the equalising goal. He later appeared in the 2018 FIFA World Cup qualification and the UEFA Euro 2020 qualifying campaign, where Finland secured its first-ever place in the main tournament group stage.

Jensen was called up for the UEFA Euro 2020 pre-tournament friendly match against Sweden on 29 May 2021. He played in two international games at the UEFA Euro 2020 tournament while Finland was placed third in Group B following a 2–0 defeat to Belgium on 21 June 2021. They were subsequently knocked out of the tournament.

== Personal life ==
Jensen's older brother Richard is also a professional footballer who plays for Panionios. Jensen is a member of the Swedish-speaking population of Finland.

== Career statistics ==
=== Club ===
As of 18 May 2026

Appearances and goals by club, season and competition
Club	Season	League			National cup (Note: Includes KNVB Cup, DFB Pokal, Greek Cup)		Continental		Total	
Club	Season	Division	Apps	Goals	Apps	Goals	Apps	Goals	Apps	Goals
Jong Twente	2016–17	Tweede Divisie	4	1	0	0	—		4	1
Twente	2016–17	Eredivisie	25	4	1	0	—		26	4
Twente	2017–18	Eredivisie	30	5	4	0	—		34	5
Twente	Total		55	9	5	0	—		60	9
Augsburg	2018–19	Bundesliga	6	0	3	0	—		9	0
Augsburg	2019–20	Bundesliga	10	1	1	0	—		11	1
Augsburg	2020–21	Bundesliga	13	0	1	2	—		14	2
Augsburg	2021–22	Bundesliga	12	0	1	1	—		13	1
Augsburg	2022–23	Bundesliga	20	2	1	1	—		21	3
Augsburg	2023–24	Bundesliga	22	2	0	0	—		22	2
Augsburg	2024–25	Bundesliga	20	0	1	0	–		21	0
Augsburg	Total		103	5	8	4	—		111	9
Augsburg II	2021–22	Regionalliga Bayern	3	1	—		—		3	1
Aris Thessaloniki	2025–26	Super League Greece	18	2	4	0	2 (Note: Appearances in UEFA Conference League)	0	24	2
Career total			183	18	17	4	2	0	202	22

=== International ===
As of match played on 15 November 2026

National team	Year	Competitive		Friendly		Total	
National team	Year	Apps	Goals	Apps	Goals	Apps	Goals
Finland	2017	2 (Note: Appearances in the 2018 FIFA World Cup qualification.)	0	3	1	5	1
Finland	2018	1 (Note: Appearance in the 2018–19 UEFA Nations League.)	0	1	1	2	1
Finland	2019	4 (Note: Appearances and goals in the UEFA Euro 2020 qualifying.)	2	0	0	4	2
Finland	2020	4 (Note: Appearances and goals in the 2020–21 UEFA Nations League.)	3	1	0	5	3
Finland	2021	6 (Note: Four appearances in the 2022 FIFA World Cup qualification, two appearances in UEFA Euro 2020.)	0	3	0	9	0
Finland	2022	1 (Note: Appearance in the 2022–23 UEFA Nations League.)	0	0	0	1	0
Finland	2023	2 (Note: Appearance in the UEFA Euro 2024.)	0	0	0	2	0
Finland	2024	4 (Note: Appearance in the UEFA Euro 2024 and 2024–25 UEFA Nations League B.)	0	1	1	5	1
Finland	2025	3 (Note: Appearances in the 2026 FIFA World Cup qualification.)	0	1	0	4	0
Finland	2026	2 (Note: Appearances in the 2026–27 UEFA Nations League C.)	0	0	0	2	0
Total		29	5	10	3	39	8

=== International goals ===
As of match played on 26 March 2024
Scores and results list Finland's goal tally first, score column indicates score after each Jensen goal.

List of international goals scored by Fredrik Jensen
No.	Date	Venue	Cap	Opponent	Score	Result	Competition
1	28 March 2017	Tivoli-Neu, Innsbruck, Austria	1	Austria	1–1	1–1	Friendly
2	26 March 2018	Gloria Sports Arena, Belek, Turkey	6	Malta	4–0	5–0	Friendly
3	26 March 2019	Vazgen Sargsyan Republican Stadium, Yerevan, Armenia	8	Armenia	1–0	2–0	UEFA Euro 2020 qualification
4	15 October 2019	Veritas Stadion, Turku, Finland	10	Armenia	1–0	3–0	UEFA Euro 2020 qualification
5	6 September 2020	Aviva Stadium, Dublin, Republic of Ireland	13	Republic of Ireland	1–0	1–0	2020–21 UEFA Nations League B
6	11 October 2020	Olympic Stadium, Helsinki, Finland	15	Bulgaria	2–0	2–0	2020–21 UEFA Nations League B
7	14 October 2020	Olympic Stadium, Helsinki, Finland	16	Republic of Ireland	1–0	1–0	2020–21 UEFA Nations League B
8	26 March 2024	Olympic Stadium, Helsinki, Finland	30	Estonia	1–0	2–1	Friendly
