= Arne Maier =

German footballer (born 1999)

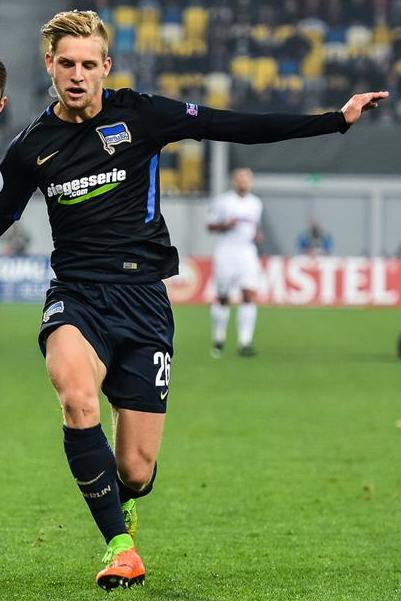
- Maier with Hertha BSC in 2017

Personal information
- Full name: Arne Carl Maier
- Date of birth: 8 January 1999 (age 27)
- Place of birth: Ludwigsfelde, Germany
- Height: 1.86 m (6 ft 1 in)
- Position: Midfielder

Team information
- Current team: Újpest
- Number: 10

Youth career
- –2007: Ludwigsfelder FC
- 2007–2017: Hertha BSC

Senior career*
Years	Team	Apps	(Gls)
2017	Hertha BSC II	8	(0)
2017–2022	Hertha BSC	58	(0)
2020–2021	→ Arminia Bielefeld (loan)	16	(0)
2021–2022	→ FC Augsburg (loan)	29	(1)
2022–2026	FC Augsburg	81	(7)
2026–	Újpest	9	(0)

International career
2013	Germany U15	2	(0)
2014–2015	Germany U16	5	(0)
2015–2016	Germany U17	16	(4)
2017	Germany U18	1	(1)
2017–2018	Germany U19	9	(3)
2018–2021	Germany U21	18	(1)
2021	Germany Olympic	3	(0)
Medal record
Representing Germany
UEFA European Under-21 Championship
Winner	2021
Runner-up	2019
- * Club domestic league appearances and goals as of 30 May 2026

Arne Carl Maier (German pronunciation: [ˈaʁnə ˈmaɪɐ]; born 8 January 1999) is a German professional footballer who plays as a midfielder for Hungarian NB I club Újpest. He played for the Germany national under-21 team.

== Club career ==
On 24 May 2022, Maier moved to FC Augsburg on a three-year contract with an option to extend, after playing at the club on loan in the previous season.

On 1 February 2026, Maier joined Újpest in Hungary.

== Career statistics ==
As of 23 August 2025

Appearances and goals by club, season and competition
Club	Season	League			Cup		Continental		Total	
Club	Season	Division	Apps	Goals	Apps	Goals	Apps	Goals	Apps	Goals
Hertha BSC II	2016–17	Regionalliga Nordost	3	0	—		—		3	0
Hertha BSC II	2017–18	Regionalliga Nordost	5	0	—		—		5	0
Hertha BSC II	2019–20	Regionalliga Nordost	1	0	—		—		1	0
Hertha BSC II	Total		9	0	—		—		9	0
Hertha BSC	2016–17	Bundesliga	1	0	0	0	—		1	0
Hertha BSC	2017–18	Bundesliga	17	0	1	0	3	0	21	0
Hertha BSC	2018–19	Bundesliga	24	0	2	0	—		26	0
Hertha BSC	2019–20	Bundesliga	14	0	1	0	—		15	0
Hertha BSC	2020–21	Bundesliga	2	0	0	0	—		2	0
Hertha BSC	Total		58	0	4	0	3	0	65	0
Arminia Bielefeld (loan)	2020–21	Bundesliga	17	0	1	0	—		18	0
FC Augsburg (loan)	2021–22	Bundesliga	29	1	1	0	—		30	1
FC Augsburg	2022–23	Bundesliga	30	5	2	1	—		32	6
FC Augsburg	2023–24	Bundesliga	22	2	1	0	—		23	2
FC Augsburg	2024–25	Bundesliga	28	0	4	2	—		32	2
FC Augsburg	2025–26	Bundesliga	1	0	0	0	—		1	0
FC Augsburg	Total		110	8	8	3	—		118	11
Career total			194	8	13	3	3	0	210	11

== Honours ==
Germany U21

- UEFA European Under-21 Championship: 2021; runner-up: 2019

Individual

- UEFA European Under-21 Championship Team of the Tournament: 2021
- Fritz Walter U17 bronze medal: 2016
- Fritz Walter U19 silver medal: 2018
