= Felix Uduokhai =

German footballer (born 1997)

Personal information
- Full name: Felix Ohis Uduokhai
- Date of birth: 9 September 1997 (age 29)
- Place of birth: Annaberg-Buchholz, Germany
- Height: 1.93 m (6 ft 4 in)
- Position: Centre-back

Team information
- Current team: Union Berlin
- Number: 2

Youth career
- VfB Annaberg 09
- Erzgebirge Aue
- 2008–2016: 1860 Munich

Senior career*
Years	Team	Apps	(Gls)
	1860 Munich II	5	(0)
2016–2017	1860 Munich	21	(1)
2017–2020	VfL Wolfsburg	30	(1)
2019–2020	→ FC Augsburg (loan)	26	(0)
2020–2025	FC Augsburg	94	(3)
2021	FC Augsburg II	1	(0)
2024–2025	→ Beşiktaş (loan)	26	(0)
2025–2026	Beşiktaş	15	(0)
2026–	Union Berlin	6	(0)

International career
2015	Germany U19	1	(0)
2016–2018	Germany U20	3	(0)
2018–2019	Germany U21	6	(1)
2021	Germany Olympic	3	(1)
Medal record
UEFA European Under-21 Championship
Runner-up	2019
- * Club domestic league appearances and goals as of 24 October 2026

Felix Ohis Uduokhai (born 9 September 1997) is a German professional footballer who plays as a centre-back for Bundesliga club Union Berlin.

== Club career ==
Uduokhai was born to a Nigerian father and German mother, and is a Germany youth international. In June 2017, after his previous team 1860 Munich had been relegated from 2. Bundesliga to fourth tier Regionalliga Bayern, Uduokhai moved to Bundesliga side VfL Wolfsburg, signing a five-year-contract until 2022.

On 28 August 2019, it was announced that Uduokhai will be on loan to FC Augsburg until the end of the season.

On 4 June 2020, FC Augsburg confirmed they would use the option to buy in Uduokhai’s loan deal. He completed a permanent transfer to the club for a fee of €9 million.

=== Beşiktaş ===
On 27 August 2024, Uduokhai was loaned to Süper Lig club Beşiktaş for the 2024–25 season with an option to buy.

Uduokhai joined Beşiktaş for €5 million after a loan with a mandatory purchase clause.

=== Union Berlin ===
On 27 August 2026, Udokhai transferred to Union Berlin permanently.

== International career ==
Uduokhai has played several matches with the German U19, U20, and U21 national teams. Playing for Nigeria is still an option for Uduokhai, if he doesn’t get an any opportunities with Germany. He earned his first call-up for the German senior team on 6 November 2020, although he did not play a match.

Uduokhai was named in Germany's squad for the 2020 Summer Olympics, where he scored the winning goal in the team's second match, a header from a Max Kruse corner to give Germany a 3–2 victory over Saudi Arabia.

== Career statistics ==
As of match played 24 October 2026

Appearances and goals by club, season and competition
Club	Season	League			National cup (Note: Includes DFB-Pokal, Turkish Cup)		Continental		Other		Total	
Club	Season	Division	Apps	Goals	Apps	Goals	Apps	Goals	Apps	Goals	Apps	Goals
1860 Munich II	2015–16	Regionalliga Bayern	2	0	—		—		—		2	0
1860 Munich II	2016–17	Regionalliga Bayern	3	0	—		—		—		3	0
1860 Munich II	Total		5	0	—		—		—		5	0
1860 Munich	2016–17	2. Bundesliga	21	1	1	0	—		—		22	1
VfL Wolfsburg	2017–18	Bundesliga	19	1	3	2	—		2 (Note: Appearances in Bundesliga promotion play-offs)	0	24	3
VfL Wolfsburg	2018–19	Bundesliga	11	0	1	0	—		—		12	0
VfL Wolfsburg	2019–20	Bundesliga	0	0	1	0	—		—		1	0
VfL Wolfsburg	Total		30	1	5	2	—		2	0	37	3
FC Augsburg (loan)	2019–20	Bundesliga	26	0	0	0	—		—		26	0
FC Augsburg	2020–21	Bundesliga	29	1	2	0	—		—		31	1
FC Augsburg	2021–22	Bundesliga	13	0	1	0	—		—		14	0
FC Augsburg	2022–23	Bundesliga	19	0	1	0	—		—		20	0
FC Augsburg	2023–24	Bundesliga	33	2	0	0	—		—		33	2
FC Augsburg	Total		94	3	4	0	—		—		98	3
FC Augsburg II	2021–22	Regionalliga Bayern	1	0	—		—		—		1	0
Beşiktaş (loan)	2024–25	Süper Lig	26	0	3	0	7 (Note: Appearances in UEFA Europa League)	0	—		36	0
Beşiktaş	2025–26	Süper Lig	10	0	2	0	5 (Note: Two appearances in UEFA Europa League, three appearances in UEFA Conference League)	0	—		17	0
Beşiktaş	Total		36	0	5	0	12	0	—		53	0
Union Berlin	2026–27	Bundesliga	6	0	0	0	—		—		6	0
Career total			219	5	15	2	12	0	2	0	248	7
