= Tomáš Koubek =

Czech footballer

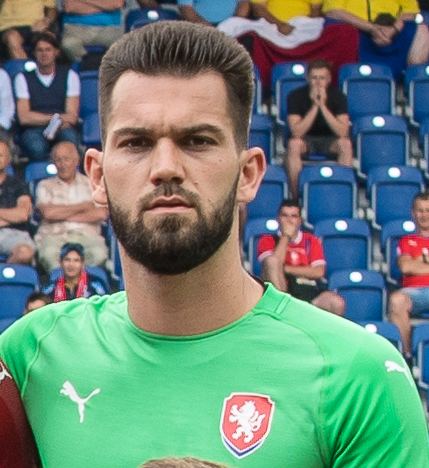
- Koubek with Czech Republic in 2018

Personal information
- Date of birth: 26 August 1992 (age 34)
- Place of birth: Hradec Králové, Czechoslovakia
- Height: 1.97 m (6 ft 6 in)
- Position: Goalkeeper

Team information
- Current team: Slovan Liberec
- Number: 40

Youth career
- Hradec Králové

Senior career*
Years	Team	Apps	(Gls)
2010–2015	Hradec Králové	73	(0)
2015–2017	Sparta Prague	27	(0)
2015–2016	→ Slovan Liberec (loan)	25	(0)
2017–2019	Rennes	67	(0)
2019–2024	Augsburg	38	(0)
2025–	Slovan Liberec	40	(0)

International career
2009–2010	Czech Republic U18	5	(0)
2010–2011	Czech Republic U19	12	(0)
2012	Czech Republic U20	1	(0)
2012–2015	Czech Republic U21	17	(0)
2016–2023	Czech Republic	12	(0)
- * Club domestic league appearances and goals as of 27 May 2026

Tomáš Koubek (born 26 August 1992) is a Czech professional footballer who plays as a goalkeeper for Czech First League club Slovan Liberec.

== Club career ==
=== Early football career in the Czech Republic ===
Koubek made his league debut for Hradec Králové in a 2–1 win against Mladá Boleslav on 30 April 2011. After Hradec Králové were relegated at the end of the 2014–15 Czech First League, Koubek joined Sparta Prague on a four-year contract, immediately going out on loan to Slovan Liberec for the 2015–16 season.

In October 2016, Sparta Prague ordered Koubek to train with their women's team, stating "women belong at the stove" in reaction to a decision against him by a female assistant referee, Lucie Ratajová.

He mainly started on the substitute bench during the 2017–18 Czech First League, but was later given preference in goal over his competitor, Slovak goalkeeper Martin Dúbravka.

=== Rennes ===
At the end of August 2017, Koubek transferred from Sparta Prague to Ligue 1 club Rennes for a four-year contract, becoming the club's second Czech goalkeeper after Petr Čech had played there between 2002 and 2004. He made his Ligue 1 debut in a 3–1 victory against Marseille on 10 September 2017.

=== Augsburg ===
On 6 August 2019, German side FC Augsburg of the Bundesliga announced the transfer of Koubek from Rennes on a four-year contract for an undisclosed transfer fee. On 19 June 2024, Augsburg announced that Koubek will leave the club upon the expiration of his contract on 30 June.

=== Slovan Liberec ===
On 11 January 2025, Koubek signed a contract with Czech First League club Slovan Liberec until June 2027.

== International career ==
In October 2015, Koubek was called up by coach Pavel Vrba to the Czech senior team. He debuted in a friendly match against Scotland on 24 March 2016, ending in a 0–1 defeat. Later, Koubek was included in the final 23-man squad for UEFA Euro 2016.

Koubek was not initially included in the Czech squad for UEFA Euro 2020. However, due to Jiří Pavlenka suffering an injury, Koubek replaced him for the tournament.

== Career statistics ==
=== Club ===
As of match played 24 May 2026

Appearances and goals by club, season and competition
Club	Season	League			National cup		League Cup		Europe		Other		Total	
Club	Season	Division	Apps	Goals	Apps	Goals	Apps	Goals	Apps	Goals	Apps	Goals	Apps	Goals
Hradec Králové	2010–11	Czech First League	2	0	0	0	—		—		—		2	0
Hradec Králové	2011–12	Czech First League	13	0	0	0	—		—		—		13	0
Hradec Králové	2012–13	Czech First League	20	0	0	0	—		—		—		20	0
Hradec Králové	2013–14	Czech First League	13	0	1	0	—		—		—		14	0
Hradec Králové	2014–15	Czech First League	26	0	0	0	—		—		—		26	0
Hradec Králové	Total		74	0	1	0	—		—		—		75	0
Slovan Liberec (loan)	2015–16	Czech First League	25	0	0	0	—		10 (Note: Appearances in UEFA Europa League)	0	—		35	0
Sparta Prague	2016–17	Czech First League	23	0	0	0	—		10	0	—		33	0
Sparta Prague	2017–18	Czech First League	4	0	0	0	—		0	0	—		4	0
Sparta Prague	Total		27	0	0	0	—		10	0	—		37	0
Rennes	2017–18	Ligue 1	34	0	0	0	0	0	—		—		34	0
Rennes	2018–19	Ligue 1	33	0	6	0	2	0	7	0	—		48	0
Rennes	2019–20	Ligue 1	0	0	0	0	0	0	—		1 (Note: Appearances in Trophée des Champions)	0	1	0
Rennes	Total		67	0	6	0	2	0	7	0	1	0	83	0
Augsburg	2019–20	Bundesliga	24	0	1	0	—		—		—		25	0
Augsburg	2020–21	Bundesliga	0	0	0	0	—		—		—		0	0
Augsburg	2021–22	Bundesliga	0	0	0	0	—		—		—		0	0
Augsburg	2022–23	Bundesliga	11	0	1	0	—		—		—		12	0
Augsburg	2023–24	Bundesliga	3	0	0	0	—		—		—		3	0
Augsburg	Total		38	0	2	0	—		—		—		40	0
Slovan Liberec	2024–25	Czech First League	7	0	0	0	—		—		—		7	0
Slovan Liberec	2025–26	Czech First League	33	0	0	0	—		—		—		33	0
Slovan Liberec	Total		40	0	2	0	—		—		—		40	0
Career total			271	0	9	0	2	0	27	0	1	0	310	0

=== International ===
Appearances and goals by national team and year
National team	Year	Apps	Goals
Czech Republic	2015	0	0
Czech Republic	2016	4	0
Czech Republic	2017	2	0
Czech Republic	2018	3	0
Czech Republic	2019	0	0
Czech Republic	2020	2	0
Czech Republic	2021	0	0
Czech Republic	2022	1	0
Czech Republic	2023	0	0
Total		12	0

== Honours ==
Stade Rennais

- Coupe de France: 2018–19

Czech Republic U19

- UEFA European Under-19 Championship runner-up: 2011
