= Iago (footballer, born 1997) =

Brazilian footballer

Personal information
- Full name: Iago Amaral Borduchi
- Date of birth: 23 March 1997 (age 29)
- Place of birth: Monte Azul Paulista, Brazil
- Height: 1.81 m (5 ft 11 in)
- Position: Left-back

Team information
- Current team: São Paulo (on loan from Bahia)
- Number: 12

Youth career
- Monte Azul
- 2013–2017: Internacional

Senior career*
Years	Team	Apps	(Gls)
2017–2019	Internacional	62	(0)
2019–2024	FC Augsburg	101	(5)
2024–	Bahia	38	(2)
2026–	→ São Paulo (loan)	0	(0)

International career
2016	Brazil U20		
2019–2020	Brazil U23	7	(0)
- * Club domestic league appearances and goals as of 7 April 2026

Iago Amaral Borduchi (born 23 March 1997) is a Brazilian professional footballer who plays as a left-back for Campeonato Brasileiro Série A club São Paulo, on loan from Bahia.

== Club career ==
Born in Monte Azul Paulista, Iago started his youth career with the academy of local Monte Azul. Although initially, he played as a forward, he later switched to left-back position. He moved to the youth setup of Internacional in 2013, at the age of 16.

Ahead of the 2017 season, Iago was promoted to the senior team. On 8 February, he extended his contract until 2020. Fifteen days later, he made his first team debut, starting in a 3–1 victory against Cricúima, in Primeira Liga.

In 2018 season, Iago started playing regularly for the first team owing to the injured Uendel; going on to play even after the latter's recovery. On 23 May 2018, he renewed his contract till 2021.

On 23 June 2019, German Bundesliga club FC Augsburg confirmed, that they had signed Iago on a contract until 30 June 2024.

In May 2024, Iago announced that he will return to Brazil and join Bahia.

== International career ==
Iago was called to the Brazil under-20 team for the 2016 Suwon JS Cup.

== Career statistics ==
As of match played on 18 May 2024

Appearances and goals by club, season and competition
Club	Season	League			State League		Cup		Continental		Other		Total	
Club	Season	Division	Apps	Goals	Apps	Goals	Apps	Goals	Apps	Goals	Apps	Goals	Apps	Goals
Internacional	2017	Série B	2	0	0	0	3	0	—		2 (Note: Appearances in Primeira Liga)	0	7	0
Internacional	2018	Série A	35	0	9	1	6	1	—		0	0	50	2
Internacional	2019	Série A	5	0	11	0	1	0	6 (Note: Appearances in Copa Libertadores)	0	0	0	23	0
Internacional	Total		42	0	20	1	10	1	6	0	2	0	80	2
Augsburg	2019–20	Bundesliga	10	1	—		0	0	—		—		10	1
Augsburg	2020–21	Bundesliga	18	1	—		2	0	—		—		20	1
Augsburg	2021–22	Bundesliga	28	2	—		2	0	—		—		30	2
Augsburg	2022–23	Bundesliga	22	0	—		2	0	—		—		24	0
Augsburg	2023–24	Bundesliga	23	1	—		0	0	—		—		23	1
Augsburg	Total		101	5	—		6	0	—		—		107	5
Bahia	2024	Série A	0	0	0	0	0	0	0	0	—		0	0
Career total			143	5	20	1	16	1	6	0	2	0	187	7
