= Mads Valentin =

Danish footballer (born 1996)

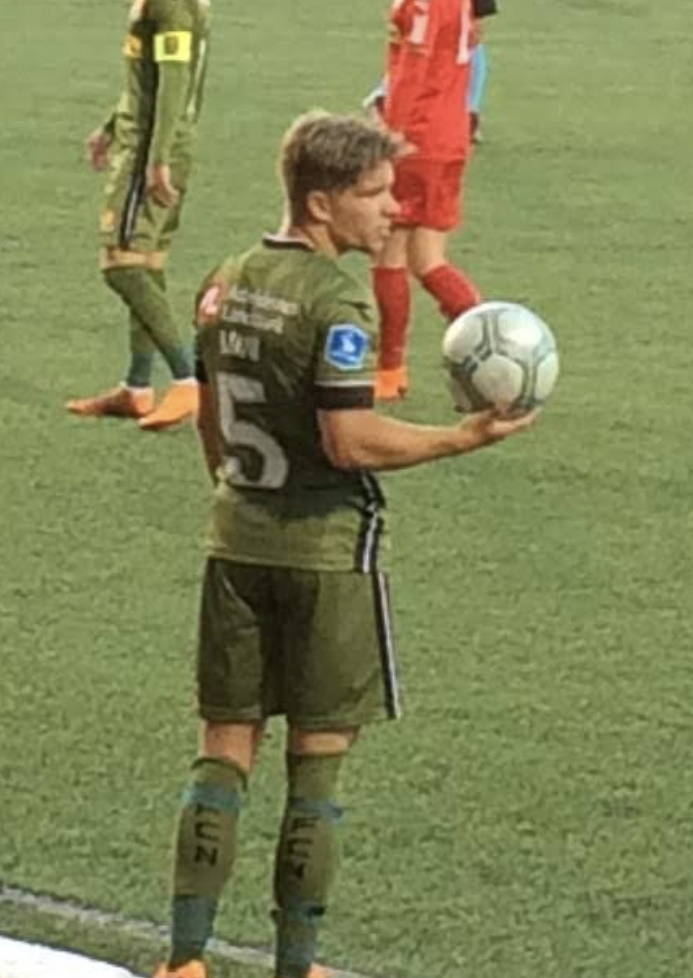
- Valentin with Nordsjælland in 2018

Personal information
- Full name: Mads Giersing Valentin Pedersen
- Date of birth: 1 September 1996 (age 30)
- Place of birth: Kokkedal, Denmark
- Height: 1.74 m (5 ft 9 in)
- Positions: Left-back; left wing-back

Team information
- Current team: Hertha BSC
- Number: 22

Youth career
- Snekkersten
- Nivå-Kokkedal
- Hørsholm-Usserød
- Nordsjælland

Senior career*
Years	Team	Apps	(Gls)
2015–2019	Nordsjælland	88	(3)
2019–2026	FC Augsburg	115	(3)
2020	→ FC Zürich (loan)	2	(0)
2025	FC Augsburg II	1	(0)
2026–	Hertha BSC	11	(1)

International career
2013–2014	Denmark U18	5	(0)
2014–2015	Denmark U19	13	(0)
2015–2017	Denmark U20	3	(0)
2016–2019	Denmark U21	14	(0)
- * Club domestic league appearances and goals as of 20:35, 4 November 2026 (UTC)

Mads Giersing Valentin Pedersen (born 1 September 1996), usually known as Mads Mini or Mads Valentin, is a Danish professional footballer who plays as a left-back or left wing-back for 2. Bundesliga club Hertha BSC.

== Club career ==
=== FC Nordsjælland ===
Valentin was promoted to the first team squad in the summer of 2015, at the age of 19 and got his contract extended.

On 27 September 2015, Valentin got his Superliga debut in a game against AGF, who FCN won 2–0, where he came on the pitch in the 93rd minute, replacing Oliver Thychosen. During the 2016–17 season, Valentin became a key player for FCN and the U21 national team.

Valentin's contract got extended in the summer of 2017, and besides that, he also revealed that he dreamed of a foreign adventure. In September 2017, Valentin suffered from a horrible ligament injury in his knee, that would keep him out for at least eight weeks.

In November 2018, Mads changed his shirt name from his nickname "Mini" to his middle name "Valentin" to honor his family.

=== FC Augsburg ===
On 27 June 2019, Valentin joined FC Augsburg on a contract until June 2024. Valentin got his official debut on 17 August 2019 against Borussia Dortmund where he also was noted for an assist in a 5–1 defeat. After only three games for Augsburg in his first half season, Valentin was loaned out to FC Zürich on 30 January 2020 for the rest of the season.

In July 2023, Valentin signed a contract extension with Augsburg until June 2027.

=== Hertha ===
On 24 August 2026, Valentin signed a one-season contract with Hertha BSC in 2. Bundesliga.

== International career ==
Valentin was called up to the senior Denmark squad for friendly matches against the Netherlands and Serbia on 26 and 29 March 2022, respectively.

== Career statistics ==
As of matches played 22 November 2026

Appearances and goals by club, season and competition
Club	Season	League			National cup (Note: Includes Danish Cup, DFB-Pokal)		Europe		Other		Total	
Club	Season	Division	Apps	Goals	Apps	Goals	Apps	Goals	Apps	Goals	Apps	Goals
Nordsjælland	2015–16	Danish Superliga	16	0	0	0	0	0	—		16	0
Nordsjælland	2016–17	Danish Superliga	25	0	0	0	0	0	—		25	0
Nordsjælland	2017–18	Danish Superliga	25	3	0	0	0	0	—		25	3
Nordsjælland	2018–19	Danish Superliga	22	0	1	0	5 (Note: Appearances in UEFA Europa League)	0	—		28	0
Nordsjælland	Total		88	3	1	0	5	0	0	0	94	3
FC Augsburg	2019–20	Bundesliga	2	0	1	0	—		—		3	0
FC Augsburg	2020–21	Bundesliga	15	0	0	0	—		—		15	0
FC Augsburg	2020–21	Bundesliga	29	2	0	0	—		—		29	2
FC Augsburg	2022–23	Bundesliga	28	0	1	1	—		—		29	1
FC Augsburg	2023–24	Bundesliga	27	1	1	0	—		—		28	1
FC Augsburg	2024–25	Bundesliga	7	0	2	0	—		—		9	0
FC Augsburg	2025–26	Bundesliga	7	0	0	0	—		—		7	0
FC Augsburg	Total		115	3	5	1	—		—		120	4
FC Zürich (loan)	2021–22	Swiss Super League	2	0	—		—		—		2	0
Hertha BSC	2026–27	2. Bundesliga	11	1	1	0	—		—		12	1
Career total			216	7	7	1	5	0	0	0	228	8
