= Reece Oxford =

English footballer (born 1998)

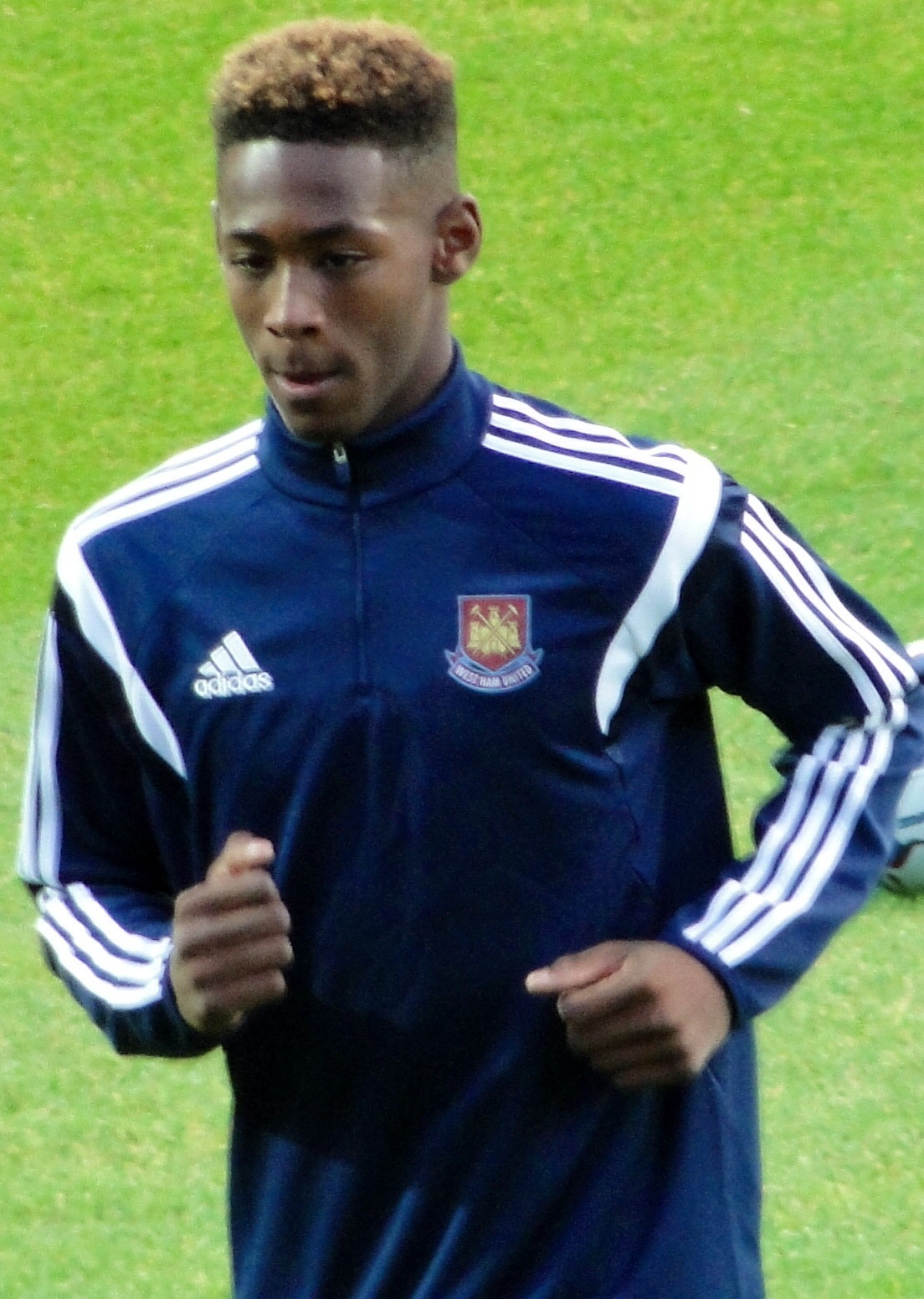
- Oxford training with West Ham United in 2014

Personal information
- Full name: Reece Joel Oxford
- Date of birth: 16 December 1998 (age 27)
- Place of birth: Edmonton, London, England
- Height: 6 ft 4 in (1.93 m)
- Positions: Centre-back; defensive midfielder

Team information
- Current team: Bromley
- Number: 39

Youth career
- –2011: Tottenham Hotspur
- 2011–2014: West Ham United

Senior career*
Years	Team	Apps	(Gls)
2014–2019	West Ham United	8	(0)
2017	→ Reading (loan)	5	(0)
2017	→ Borussia Mönchengladbach (loan)	3	(0)
2018	→ Borussia Mönchengladbach (loan)	4	(0)
2019	→ FC Augsburg (loan)	8	(0)
2019–2025	FC Augsburg	69	(2)
2023	FC Augsburg II	1	(0)
2026–	Bromley	1	(0)

International career
2013	England U16	3	(0)
2014–2015	England U17	18	(1)
2016	England U18	2	(0)
2015–2017	England U19	7	(0)
2016–2017	England U20	5	(0)
- * Club domestic league appearances and goals as of 17 May 2025

Reece Joel Oxford (born 16 December 1998) is an English professional footballer who plays as a centre-back or defensive midfielder for EFL League One club Bromley.

Oxford made his debut for boyhood club West Ham United aged 16 years and 198 days, making him the club's youngest ever player, beating a record of 16 years and 221 days set in 1922 by Billy Williams.

== Club career ==
=== West Ham United ===
Oxford was born in Edmonton, London, and was a boyhood supporter of Arsenal. He began playing football at Tottenham Hotspur's academy but was released from the club in 2011. He then joined West Ham United at under-13 level. He turned out for the under-18 team while still an under-15 schoolboy, and made the bench for a League Cup match in August 2014, still aged 15.

On 11 January 2015, Oxford signed a long-term professional contract with West Ham. Four months later, he won the Dylan Tombides Academy Player of the Year Award.

Oxford made his competitive, first team debut on 2 July 2015, aged 16, starting in midfield in a 3–0 win against Andorran club Lusitanos in a UEFA Europa League first qualifying round first leg tie. In so doing, he became West Ham's youngest ever player. He then made his Premier League debut on 9 August, playing the first 79 minutes before being substituted for Kevin Nolan as West Ham won 2–0 away to Arsenal. Following his start, Oxford became the second-youngest Premier League starter of all-time, after Jose Baxter.

Ahead of the 2016–17 season, Oxford was named in The Daily Telegraph's list of the best youth prospects in English football. On his 18th birthday, 16 December 2016, Oxford signed a new, four-and-a-half-year contract with West Ham. Just over one month later, he was sent on loan to Reading for the remainder of the season. He made his Reading debut on 11 March 2017 in a 3–0 away defeat to Preston North End, coming on as a second-half substitute for Paul McShane. He made five appearances, his final match being the 8 April away defeat to Norwich City, 7–1.

On 21 June 2017, Oxford was sent on loan to Bundesliga club Borussia Mönchengladbach for the 2017–18 season. He did not make his debut until 28 October when he came on as an 89th-minute substitute for Lars Stindl in a 3–1 win against Hoffenheim. On 12 December, Oxford made his first league start for Gladbach, against Freiburg. After the match, sporting director Max Eberl praised Oxford's development during his time at the club and stated exploratory talks had taken place over a permanent deal. His loan was cut short and he returned to West Ham on 29 December 2017.

On 31 January 2018, Oxford was loaned to Borussia Mönchengladbach again.

=== Augsburg ===
On 31 January 2019, Oxford again went out on loan, this time joining fellow Bundesliga team FC Augsburg until the end of the season. Oxford made nine appearances for Augsburg, his final game coming in the last day of the Bundesliga season in an 8–1 defeat by Wolfsburg. On 2 August 2019, Oxford joined Augsburg permanently on a four-year deal.

Oxford suffered a meniscus tear in July 2021, which required surgery. In late summer 2022, Oxford began battling the long-term effects of COVID-19. On 22 November 2022, he made his comeback in the home game against VfL Bochum but did not make any further Bundesliga appearances afterward. On 17 March 2023, he started for FC Augsburg II against SV Wacker Burghausen. However, he suffered another health setback due to muscle injuries as a result of long COVID subsequently and underwent continued medical treatment.

On 17 May 2025, Oxford announced that he would leave Augsburg at the end of the 2024–25 season.

=== Bromley ===
On 19 November 2026, League One club Bromley announced the signing of Oxford on a free transfer. He made his debut in a 1-0 away win vs Reading.

== International career ==
Oxford has played for England up to under-20 level and captained his country at the 2015 UEFA European Under-17 Championship. The Young Lions reached the quarter-finals, and Oxford scored in the penalty shootout as they defeated Spain in a play-off for the 2015 FIFA U-17 World Cup. West Ham refused permission for him to play in the U-17 World Cup in Chile, fearing that exposure to an international football tournament would lead to burnout.

== Style of play ==
In 2016, UEFA.com described his playing style as, "Tall and quick, he is not daunted in the face of illustrious opponents." On several occasions during his youth player career, Oxford was compared to former West Ham academy graduate Rio Ferdinand.

== Personal life ==
Oxford is of Jamaican descent through his grandfather. His grandfather, Karl, is the brother of the Jamaican footballer Neville Oxford. In December 2018, Oxford was the victim of a theft when his 18-carat Rolex watch was stolen from the changing rooms at West Ham's Chadwell Heath training ground.

== Career statistics ==
As of 22 May 2023

Appearances and goals by club, season and competition
Club	Season	League			National cup (Note: Includes FA Cup, DFB-Pokal)		League cup		Continental		Total	
Club	Season	Division	Apps	Goals	Apps	Goals	Apps	Goals	Apps	Goals	Apps	Goals
West Ham United	2014–15	Premier League	0	0	0	0	0	0	—		0	0
West Ham United	2015–16	Premier League	7	0	2	0	0	0	3 (Note: Appearances in UEFA Europa League)	0	12	0
West Ham United	2016–17	Premier League	0	0	0	0	0	0	2	0	2	0
West Ham United	2017–18	Premier League	1	0	2	0	—		—		3	0
West Ham United	2018–19	Premier League	0	0	0	0	0	0	—		0	0
West Ham United	Total		8	0	4	0	0	0	5	0	17	0
Reading (loan)	2016–17	Championship	5	0	0	0	0	0	—		5	0
Borussia Mönchengladbach (loan)	2017–18	Bundesliga	7	0	1	0	—		—		8	0
West Ham United U-21s	2018–19	—	—		—		—		2 (Note: Appearance(s) in EFL Trophy)	0	2	0
FC Augsburg (loan)	2018–19	Bundesliga	8	0	1	0	—		—		9	0
FC Augsburg	2019–20	Bundesliga	12	0	0	0	—		—		12	0
FC Augsburg	2020–21	Bundesliga	24	0	1	0	—		—		25	0
FC Augsburg	2021–22	Bundesliga	30	2	1	1	—		—		31	3
FC Augsburg	2022–23	Bundesliga	3	0	0	0	—		—		3	0
FC Augsburg	2023–24	Bundesliga	0	0	0	0	—		—		0	0
FC Augsburg	2024–25	Bundesliga	0	0	0	0	—		—		0	0
FC Augsburg	Total		77	2	3	1	0	0	0	0	80	3
FC Augsburg II	2022–23	Regionalliga Bayern	1	0	0	0	—		—		1	0
Career total			98	2	8	1	0	0	7	0	113	3

== Honours ==
=== Club ===
West Ham United U21

- Under-21 Premier League Cup: 2015–16

=== Individual ===
- Dylan Tombides Academy Player of the Year Award: 2015
- Young Hammer of the Year: 2015–16
