= Niklas Dorsch =

German footballer (born 1998)

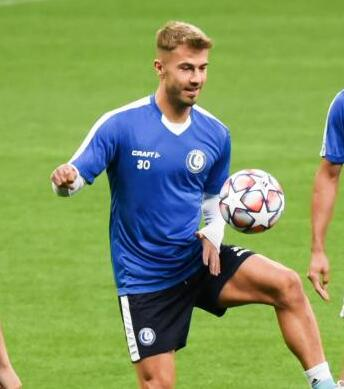
- Dorsch with Gent in 2020

Personal information
- Full name: Niklas Bernd Dorsch
- Date of birth: 15 January 1998 (age 28)
- Place of birth: Lichtenfels, Germany
- Height: 1.75 m (5 ft 9 in)
- Position: Defensive midfielder

Team information
- Current team: Toronto FC
- Number: 6

Youth career
- 2002–2006: 1. FC Baiersdorf
- 2006–2009: DTFS Rehau
- 2009–2012: 1. FC Nürnberg
- 2012–2018: Bayern Munich

Senior career*
Years	Team	Apps	(Gls)
2016–2018	Bayern Munich II	61	(7)
2016–2018	Bayern Munich	1	(1)
2018–2020	1. FC Heidenheim	62	(3)
2020–2021	Gent	33	(3)
2021–2024	FC Augsburg	63	(1)
2022	FC Augsburg II	1	(0)
2024–2026	1. FC Heidenheim	54	(2)
2026–	Toronto FC	14	(2)

International career^{‡}
2012	Germany U15	1	(0)
2014–2015	Germany U17	15	(0)
2016	Germany U19	2	(0)
2018–2019	Germany U20	6	(0)
2019–2021	Germany U21	13	(1)
Medal record
Representing Germany
UEFA European Under-21 Championship
Winner	2021
- * Club domestic league appearances and goals as of 7 November 2026 ‡ National team caps and goals as of 20:55, 6 June 2021 (UTC)

Niklas Bernd Dorsch (born 15 January 1998) is a German professional footballer who plays as a defensive midfielder for Canadian Major League Soccer club Toronto FC.

== Club career ==
=== Bayern Munich ===
On 2 September 2015, Dorsch signed a one-year apprentice contract, lasting until 30 June 2016, followed by a two-year full professional contract from 1 July 2016 until 30 June 2018.

In the 2015–16 season, Dorsch joined the squad of Bayern Munich II, making his debut in the Regionalliga Bayern on 5 March 2016 in a 0–1 away loss against Wacker Burghausen. Dorsch scored his first goal for the reserve team in the first match of the 2016–17 season on 17 July 2016, opening the scoring in the 7th minute of the 2–1 home win against FV Illertissen. The following season, Dorsch became captain of the second team.

In the 2017–18 season, Dorsch made his Bundesliga debut for the first team on 28 April 2018 in a 4–1 home win against Eintracht Frankfurt. Dorsch opened the scoring in the 43rd minute via an assist from Sandro Wagner.

=== 1. FC Heidenheim ===
On 23 May 2018, Dorsch moved to 2. Bundesliga side 1. FC Heidenheim on a free transfer, with a three-year contract lasting until 30 June 2021.

=== Gent ===
On 22 July 2020, Dorsch joined Belgian Pro League side Gent, signing a four-year contract.

=== FC Augsburg ===
On 8 July 2021, Dorsch joined Bundesliga side FC Augsburg, signing a five-year contract until 30 June 2026.

=== Toronto FC ===
On 28 July 2026, Dorsch moved to Major League Soccer and joined Toronto FC until the end of the 2030–31 season. A month later, on 15 August, he scored his first goal from a long-range strike in a 2–1 victory over New England Revolution.

== Career statistics ==
=== Club ===
As of match played 7 November 2026

Appearances and goals by club, season and competition
Club	Season	League			National cup (Note: Includes DFB-Pokal, Belgian Cup)		Continental		Other		Total	
Club	Season	Division	Apps	Goals	Apps	Goals	Apps	Goals	Apps	Goals	Apps	Goals
Bayern Munich II	2015–16	Regionalliga Bayern	6	0	—		—		—		6	0
Bayern Munich II	2016–17	Regionalliga Bayern	24	3	—		—		—		24	3
Bayern Munich II	2017–18	Regionalliga Bayern	31	4	—		—		—		31	4
Bayern Munich II	Total		61	7	—		—		—		61	7
Bayern Munich	2017–18	Bundesliga	1	1	0	0	0	0	0	0	1	1
1. FC Heidenheim	2018–19	2. Bundesliga	30	2	3	0	—		—		33	2
1. FC Heidenheim	2019–20	2. Bundesliga	32	1	2	0	—		2 (Note: Appearances in Bundesliga promotion/relegation play-offs)	0	36	1
1. FC Heidenheim	Total		62	3	5	0	—		2	0	69	3
Gent	2020–21	Belgian Pro League	33	3	2	0	8 (Note: Three appearances and one goal in UEFA Champions League, five appearances in UEFA Europa League)	1	0	0	43	4
FC Augsburg	2021–22	Bundesliga	30	1	1	0	—		—		31	1
FC Augsburg	2022–23	Bundesliga	11	0	0	0	—		—		11	0
FC Augsburg	2023–24	Bundesliga	21	0	1	0	—		—		22	0
FC Augsburg	2024–25	Bundesliga	1	0	1	1	—		—		2	1
FC Augsburg	Total		63	1	3	1	—		—		66	2
FC Augsburg II	2022–23	Regionalliga Bayern	1	0	—		—		—		1	0
1. FC Heidenheim	2024–25	Bundesliga	22	2	1	0	5 (Note: Appearances in UEFA Conference League)	0	2	0	30	2
1. FC Heidenheim	2025–26	Bundesliga	32	0	2	0	—		—		34	0
1. FC Heidenheim	Total		54	2	3	0	5	0	2	0	64	2
Toronto FC	2026	Major League Soccer	14	2	—		—		—		14	2
Career total			289	19	12	1	12	1	4	0	319	21

== Honours ==
Germany U21

- UEFA European Under-21 Championship: 2021

Individual

- Fritz Walter Medal U17 Silver: 2015
- UEFA European Under-21 Championship Team of the Tournament: 2021
- Bundesliga Goal of the Month: December 2021
