= Maurice Malone =

German footballer (born 2000)

Personal information
- Full name: Maurice Maximilian Malone
- Date of birth: 17 August 2000 (age 26)
- Place of birth: Augsburg, Germany
- Position: Centre-forward

Team information
- Current team: Minnesota United
- Number: 11

Youth career
- 2008–2019: FC Augsburg

Senior career*
Years	Team	Apps	(Gls)
2019–2020	FC Augsburg II	23	(13)
2019–2023	FC Augsburg	0	(0)
2020–2021	→ Wehen Wiesbaden (loan)	35	(12)
2021–2022	→ 1. FC Heidenheim (loan)	20	(2)
2022–2023	→ Wolfsberger AC (loan)	27	(8)
2023–2025	Basel	12	(1)
2024–2025	→ Austria Wien (loan)	31	(11)
2025–2026	Sturm Graz	33	(3)
2026–	Minnesota United	0	(0)

International career^{‡}
2017	Germany U17	10	(2)
2018	Germany U18	2	(0)
2018	Germany U19	2	(1)
2022–2023	Germany U21	3	(1)
- * Club domestic league appearances and goals as of 19:32, 17 May 2026 (UTC) ‡ National team caps and goals as of 28 March 2023

Maurice Maximilian Malone (born 17 August 2000) is a German professional footballer who plays as a centre-forward for Major League Soccer club Minnesota United FC.

== Club career ==
Born and grown up in Augsburg, Malone played his youth football with local club FC Augsburg. He went through several youth stages and after playing two seasons with the reserve team he advanced to their first team, signing his first professional contract, in the summer of 2019. However, he did not play once for the first team during the 2019–20 Bundesliga season and was therefore loaned out, to gain playing experience.

Malone made his professional debut for Wehen Wiesbaden in the first round of the 2020–21 DFB-Pokal on 13 September 2020, coming on as a substitute in the 75th minute for Sebastian Mrowca against 2. Bundesliga side 1. FC Heidenheim. The home match finished as a 1–0 win for Wiesbaden.

On 30 August 2021, Malone joined 2. Bundesliga club 1. FC Heidenheim on loan until the end of the season and in the following season he was loaned out to Wolfsberger AC.

On 11 August 2023, Swiss club FC Basel announced that they had signed Malone on four-year contract and he joined them on the next day for their 2023–24 FC Basel season under head-coach Timo Schultz. Malone played his debut for his new club in the Swiss Cup away game on 20 August. He scored his first goal for the team in the same game, it was the team's fourth, as Basel went on to win 8–1 against amateur club FC Saint-Blaise. Malone played his domestic league debut for the team in the home game in the St. Jakob-Park on 3 September as Basel played a 2–2 draw with Zürich. He scored his first league goal for the team in the away game in the Stade Municipal on 24 September. However it could not help them, as Basel were defeated 3–2 by Yverdon.

On 27 November, the club announced that Malone had sustained an injury to the meniscus in his right knee during the cup game against SC Kriens one month earlier. The injury required surgery and Malone was out for a few weeks as a result.

In June 2024, Malone joined Austrian Bundesliga side Austria Wien on a season-long loan deal with the option to buy.

== International career ==
Born in Germany, Malone is of American descent. He is a youth international for Germany. He is also eligible to play the United States men's national soccer team.

== Career statistics ==
As of match played 17 May 2026

Appearances and goals by club, season and competition
Club	Season	League			National cup (Note: Includes DFB-Pokal, Swiss Cup, Austrian Cup)		Europe		Other		Total	
Club	Season	Division	Apps	Goals	Apps	Goals	Apps	Goals	Apps	Goals	Apps	Goals
FC Augsburg II	2018–19	Regionalliga Bayern	5	4	—		—		—		5	4
FC Augsburg II	2020–21	Regionalliga Bayern	18	9	—		—		—		18	9
FC Augsburg II	Total		23	13	—		—		—		23	13
Augsburg	2019–20	Bundesliga	0	0	0	0	—		—		0	0
Augsburg	2021–22	Bundesliga	0	0	1	0	—		—		1	0
Augsburg	2022–23	Bundesliga	0	0	1	1	—		—		1	1
Augsburg	Total		0	0	2	1	—		—		2	1
Wehen Wiesbaden (loan)	2020–21	3. Liga	35	12	2	0	—		1 (Note: Appearance in Hessian Cup)	0	38	12
1. FC Heidenheim (loan)	2021–22	2. Bundesliga	20	2	—		—		—		20	2
Wolfsberger AC (loan)	2022–23	Austrian Bundesliga	27	8	2	1	—		—		29	9
Basel	2023–24	Swiss Super League	12	1	4	2	—		—		16	3
Austria Wien (loan)	2024–25	Austrian Bundesliga	31	11	5	0	2 (Note: Appearances in UEFA Conference League)	1	—		38	12
Sturm Graz	2025–26	Austrian Bundesliga	33	3	4	2	12 (Note: Eight appearances in UEFA Europa League, four appearances in UEFA Conference League)	0	—		49	5
Career total			181	50	19	6	14	0	1	0	215	56
