= Rafał Gikiewicz =

Polish footballer (born 1987)

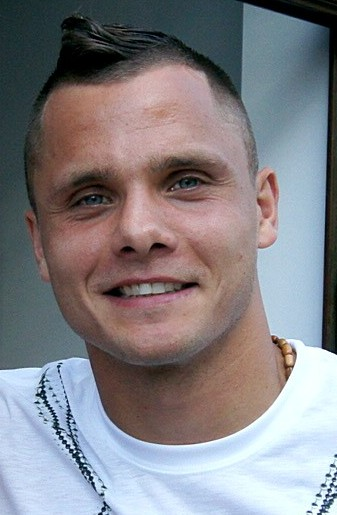
- Rafał Gikiewicz in 2012

Personal information
- Full name: Rafał Tadeusz Gikiewicz
- Date of birth: 26 October 1987 (age 39)
- Place of birth: Olsztyn, Poland
- Height: 1.90 m (6 ft 3 in)
- Position: Goalkeeper

Youth career
- Warmia Olsztyn
- Stomil Olsztyn
- Tempo 25 Olsztyn

Senior career*
Years	Team	Apps	(Gls)
2004–2005	DKS Dobre Miasto		
2006	Sokół Ostróda		
2006–2007	Drwęca Nowe Miasto L.		
2007–2008	Wigry Suwałki	28	(0)
2008–2010	Jagiellonia Białystok	16	(0)
2010	→ OKS 1945 Olsztyn (loan)	11	(0)
2011–2014	Śląsk Wrocław	27	(0)
2014–2016	Eintracht Braunschweig	66	(0)
2016–2018	SC Freiburg	2	(0)
2018–2020	Union Berlin	67	(1)
2020–2023	FC Augsburg	91	(0)
2023–2024	Ankaragücü	5	(0)
2024–2025	Widzew Łódź	50	(0)
2025–2026	Zagłębie Lubin	0	(0)
2026	Zagłębie Lubin II	3	(0)
- * Club domestic league appearances and goals as of 17:36, 29 May 2026 (UTC)

Rafał Tadeusz Gikiewicz (born 26 October 1987) is a Polish professional footballer who plays as a goalkeeper.

== Club career ==
Gikiewicz was born in Olsztyn. In July 2008, he moved to Jagiellonia Białystok. In August 2010, he was loaned to OKS 1945 Olsztyn on a one-year deal. He returned to Jagiellonia Białystok half a year later.

In January 2011, he joined Śląsk Wrocław on 4.5-year contract.

In April 2014, German club Eintracht Braunschweig announced the signing of Gikiewicz for the 2014–15 season. In August 2016, Gikiewicz transferred to Freiburg.

In June 2018, Gikiewicz moved to Union Berlin signing a two-year contract. The transfer fee paid to Freiburg was reported as €200,000. On 7 October 2018, Gikiewicz scored a 94th-minute equalizer against 1. FC Heidenheim in the 2. Bundesliga. On 1 July 2020, he signed with Bundesliga club FC Augsburg.

Over three weeks after his contract with Augsburg had expired, on 22 July 2023, Gikiewicz joined Turkish side Ankaragücü on a one-year deal with an option for another season. On 1 February 2024, he left the club by mutual consent.

On 13 February 2024, Gikiewicz returned to Poland to join Widzew Łódź until the end of the season, with an option to extend his deal for another year. Brought in as a replacement for the injured Ivan Krajčírik who joined Widzew just a month prior, Gikiewicz enjoyed a good start to his stint. He recorded four clean sheets in 11 league games before having his deal extended for a further year on 10 May. He appeared in all 34 league games played by Widzew during the 2024–25 season.

After starting the first two games of the 2025–26 season, Gikiewicz was relegated to third-choice goalkeeper behind new arrivals Maciej Kikolski and Veljko Ilić. On 22 October 2025, he terminated his contract with Widzew and joined Zagłębie Lubin on an emergency transfer.

== International career ==
During a successful period with Union Berlin, in May 2019 he received his first call-up to the Poland national team for the UEFA Euro 2020 qualifying Group G matches against North Macedonia and Israel, but remained unused on the bench.

== Personal life ==
His twin brother Łukasz Gikiewicz is also a footballer.

Gikiewicz follows a vegan diet.

== Career statistics ==
As of match played 12 May 2026

Appearances and goals by club, season and competition
Club	Season	League			National cup (Note: Includes Polish Cup, DFB-Pokal, Turkish Cup)		Europe		Other		Total	
Club	Season	Division	Apps	Goals	Apps	Goals	Apps	Goals	Apps	Goals	Apps	Goals
Wigry Suwałki	2007–08	II liga	28	0	0	0	—		—		28	0
Jagiellonia Białystok	2008–09	Ekstraklasa	8	0	1	0	—		4 (Note: Appearances in Ekstraklasa Cup)	0	13	0
Jagiellonia Białystok	2009–10	Ekstraklasa	8	0	6	0	—		—		14	0
Jagiellonia Białystok	Total		16	0	7	0	—		4	0	27	0
OKS 1945 Olsztyn (loan)	2010–11	II liga	11	0	2	0	—		—		13	0
Śląsk Wrocław	2011–12	Ekstraklasa	6	0	2	0	—		—		8	0
Śląsk Wrocław	2012–13	Ekstraklasa	10	0	6	0	1 (Note: Appearance(s) in UEFA Europa League)	0	1 (Note: Appearance in Polish Super Cup)	0	18	0
Śląsk Wrocław	2013–14	Ekstraklasa	11	0	1	0	6	0	—		18	0
Śląsk Wrocław	Total		27	0	9	0	7	0	1	0	44	0
Eintracht Braunschweig	2014–15	2. Bundesliga	33	0	3	0	—		—		36	0
Eintracht Braunschweig	2015–16	2. Bundesliga	33	0	3	0	—		—		36	0
Eintracht Braunschweig	Total		66	0	6	0	—		—		72	0
SC Freiburg	2016–17	Bundesliga	0	0	1	0	—		—		1	0
SC Freiburg	2017–18	Bundesliga	2	0	1	0	0	0	—		3	0
SC Freiburg	Total		2	0	2	0	0	0	—		4	0
Union Berlin	2018–19	2. Bundesliga	34	1	2	0	—		2 (Note: Appearances in Bundesliga promotion play-offs)	0	38	1
Union Berlin	2019–20	Bundesliga	33	0	2	0	—		—		35	0
Union Berlin	Total		67	1	4	0	—		2	0	73	1
FC Augsburg	2020–21	Bundesliga	34	0	2	0	—		—		36	0
FC Augsburg	2021–22	Bundesliga	34	0	2	0	—		—		36	0
FC Augsburg	2022–23	Bundesliga	23	0	1	0	—		—		24	0
FC Augsburg	Total		91	0	5	0	—		—		96	0
Ankaragücü	2023–24	Süper Lig	5	0	2	0	—		—		7	0
Widzew Łódź	2023–24	Ekstraklasa	14	0	1	0	—		—		15	0
Widzew Łódź	2024–25	Ekstraklasa	34	0	1	0	—		—		35	0
Widzew Łódź	2025–26	Ekstraklasa	2	0	0	0	—		—		2	0
Widzew Łódź	Total		50	0	2	0	—		—		52	0
Zagłębie Lubin	2025–26	Ekstraklasa	0	0	1	0	—		—		1	0
Zagłębie Lubin II	2025–26	III liga, gr. III	3	0	—		—		—		3	0
Career total			366	1	40	0	7	0	7	0	420	1

== Honours ==
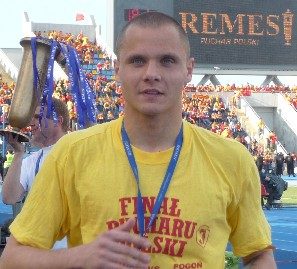
Gikiewicz in 2010 with Jagiellonia Białystok after winning the Polish Cup.

Jagiellonia Białystok

- Polish Cup: 2009–10

Śląsk Wrocław

- Ekstraklasa: 2011–12
- Polish Super Cup: 2012
