= Lasse Günther =

German footballer (born 2003)

Personal information
- Date of birth: 21 March 2003 (age 23)
- Place of birth: Munich, Germany
- Height: 1.83 m (6 ft 0 in)
- Positions: Winger; full-back; wing-back

Team information
- Current team: SV Elversberg
- Number: 21

Youth career
- –2016: FC Augsburg
- 2016–2021: Bayern Munich

Senior career*
Years	Team	Apps	(Gls)
2021	Bayern Munich II	5	(0)
2021–2022	FC Augsburg II	10	(2)
2021–2025	FC Augsburg	5	(0)
2022–2023	→ Jahn Regensburg (loan)	16	(0)
2023–2024	→ Wehen Wiesbaden (loan)	22	(1)
2024–2025	→ Karlsruher SC (loan)	20	(1)
2025–	SV Elversberg	35	(1)

International career^{‡}
2018–2019	Germany U16	8	(6)
2019	Germany U17	3	(2)
2020	Germany U18	2	(0)
2021	Germany U19	8	(1)
2023	Germany U20	2	(0)
- * Club domestic league appearances and goals as of 30 October 2026 ‡ National team caps and goals as of 27 March 2023

Lasse Günther (born 21 March 2003) is a German professional footballer who plays as a winger, full-back and wing-back for Bundesliga club SV Elversberg.

== Career ==
Günther made his professional debut for Bayern Munich II in the 3. Liga on 10 April 2021, coming on as a substitute in the 62nd minute for Nicolas Kühn against FC Ingolstadt. The away match finished as a 2–2 draw.

In May 2021, Günther transferred back to his former club FC Augsburg, and signed a contract until June 2025.

In August 2022, he was loaned to Jahn Regensburg for one season. On 25 July 2023, Günther moved on a new season-long loan to SV Wehen Wiesbaden in 2. Bundesliga. On 29 June 2024, he was loaned to Karlsruher SC.

On 1 July 2025, Günther signed a three-season contract with SV Elversberg in 2. Bundesliga.

== Career statistics ==
As of match played 30 October 2026

Appearances and goals by club, season and competition
Club	Season	League			DFB-Pokal		Other		Total	
Club	Season	Division	Apps	Goals	Apps	Goals	Apps	Goals	Apps	Goals
Bayern Munich II	2020–21	3. Liga	5	0	—		—		5	0
FC Augsburg II	2021–22	Regionalliga Bayern	10	2	—		—		10	2
FC Augsburg	2021–22	Bundesliga	5	0	2	0	—		7	0
Jahn Regensburg (loan)	2022–23	2. Bundesliga	16	0	1	0	—		17	0
Wehen Wiesbaden (loan)	2023–24	2. Bundesliga	22	1	1	0	2 (Note: Appearances in 2. Bundesliga relegation play-offs)	0	25	1
Karlsruher SC (loan)	2024–25	2. Bundesliga	20	1	2	0	—		22	1
SV Elversberg	2025–26	2. Bundesliga	27	0	1	0	—		28	0
SV Elversberg	2026–27	Bundesliga	8	1	2	0	—		10	1
SV Elversberg	Total		35	1	3	0	—		38	1
Career total			113	5	9	0	2	0	124	5
