= Raphael Framberger =

German footballer (born 1995)

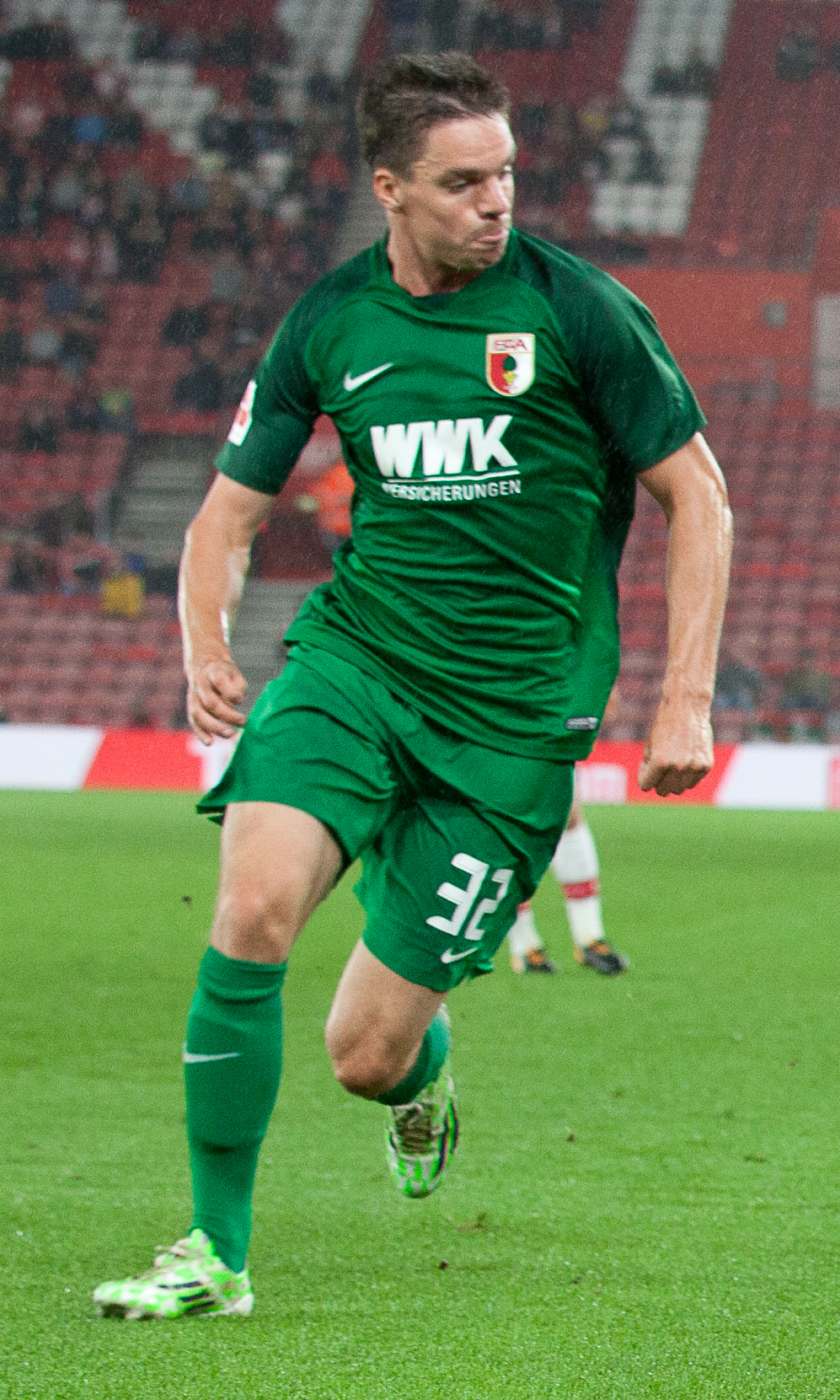
- Framberger with FC Augsburg in 2017

Personal information
- Date of birth: 6 September 1995 (age 31)
- Place of birth: Augsburg, Germany
- Height: 1.79 m (5 ft 10 in)
- Position: Right-back

Youth career
- 2002–2004: SV Cosmos Aystetten
- 2004–2013: FC Augsburg

Senior career*
Years	Team	Apps	(Gls)
2014–2022	FC Augsburg II	39	(1)
2017–2025	FC Augsburg	84	(0)
2023	→ SV Sandhausen (loan)	5	(0)
Total		128	(1)

International career
2009	Germany U15	1	(0)
2011	Germany U17	1	(0)
- * Club domestic league appearances and goals

Raphael Framberger (born 6 September 1995) is a German former professional footballer who played as a defender.

== Club career ==
On 11 January 2023, Framberger joined SV Sandhausen on loan.

== Career statistics ==
As of matches played on 25 September 2018

Appearances and goals by club, season and competition
Club	Season	League			Cup		Total		Ref.
Club	Season	Division	Apps	Goals	Apps	Goals	Apps	Goals	Ref.
FC Augsburg II	2014–15	Regionalliga Bayern	19	1	—		19	1	
FC Augsburg II	2015–16	Regionalliga Bayern	15	0	—		15	0	
FC Augsburg II	2016–17	Regionalliga Bayern	2	0	—		2	0	
FC Augsburg II	2017–18	Regionalliga Bayern	2	0	—		2	0	
FC Augsburg II	Total		38	1	—		38	1	—
FC Augsburg	2016–17	Bundesliga	3	0	0	0	3	0	
FC Augsburg	2017–18	Bundesliga	9	0	1	0	10	0	
FC Augsburg	2018–19	Bundesliga	2	0	0	0	2	0	
FC Augsburg	Total		14	0	1	0	15	0	—
Career total			52	1	1	0	53	1	—
