= Jozo Stanić =

Croatian footballer

Personal information
- Date of birth: 6 April 1999 (age 27)
- Place of birth: Augsburg, Germany
- Height: 1.84 m (6 ft 0 in)
- Position: Centre-back

Team information
- Current team: St. Gallen
- Number: 4

Youth career
- FC Stätzling
- –2014: Schwaben Augsburg
- 2014–2018: FC Augsburg

Senior career*
Years	Team	Apps	(Gls)
2018–2023	FC Augsburg II	43	(1)
2018–2023	FC Augsburg	1	(0)
2020–2021	→ FSV Zwickau (loan)	36	(1)
2021–2022	→ Wehen Wiesbaden (loan)	25	(0)
2022–2023	→ Varaždin (loan)	31	(0)
2023–	St. Gallen	92	(2)

International career^{‡}
2015	Germany U16	1	(0)
2016–2017	Croatia U19	4	(0)
2022–2023	Croatia U23	2	(0)
- * Club domestic league appearances and goals as of 28 September 2026 ‡ National team caps and goals as of 9 June 2023

Jozo Stanić (born 6 April 1999) is a professional footballer who plays as a centre-back for Swiss club St. Gallen. Born in Germany, he has most recently represented Croatia at youth level.

== Career ==
Stanić signed his first professional contract with FC Augsburg in July 2018, lasting four years until 30 June 2022. He made his professional debut for Augsburg in the Bundesliga on 10 February 2019, coming on as a substitute in the 88th minute for Daniel Baier in the 0–4 away loss against Werder Bremen.

In August 2020, Stanić extended his contract with Augsburg by a further year to the summer of 2023 and joined 3. Liga side FSV Zwickau on a season-long loan.

On 2 September 2023, Stanić signed a two-year contract with St. Gallen in Switzerland.
