= Frederik Winther =

Danish footballer (born 2001)

Personal information
- Full name: Frederik Franck Winther
- Date of birth: 4 January 2001 (age 25)
- Place of birth: Gentofte, Denmark
- Height: 1.86 m (6 ft 1 in)
- Position: Centre-back

Team information
- Current team: Hammarby
- Number: 3

Youth career
- 2007–2014: B 1903
- 2014–2018: Lyngby

Senior career*
Years	Team	Apps	(Gls)
2018–2020	Lyngby	38	(0)
2020–2024	Augsburg	5	(0)
2020–2021	→ Lyngby (loan)	17	(1)
2021–2023	→ Augsburg II (res.)	4	(0)
2023	→ Brøndby (loan)	15	(0)
2024	→ Estoril (loan)	2	(0)
2024–	Hammarby IF	44	(2)

International career
2018–2019	Denmark U18	4	(1)
2019–2020	Denmark U19	7	(1)
2021	Denmark U20	2	(0)
2021–2022	Denmark U21	7	(0)
- * Club domestic league appearances and goals as of 7 November 2026

Frederik Franck Winther (Danish pronunciation: [ˈve̝nˀtɐ]; born 4 January 2001) is a Danish professional footballer who plays as a centre-back for Allsvenskan club Hammarby IF. Winther began his career with B 1903 in 2007 at the age of six and later joined Lyngby BK’s youth team in 2014. He has also played for FC Augsburg and Bröndby IF.

== Club career ==
=== Lyngby ===
Winther began his career with B 1903 in 2007 at age six. He progressed through the club's academy to the under-13 team before making a move to the Lyngby youth team in 2014.

Winther progressed through the Lyngby academy while playing matches for his primary school, Kildegård Privatskole in the Ekstra Bladet School Football Tournament in 2016. He made his professional debut on 20 March 2019, replacing Jesper Christjansen in a 2–0 win over Silkeborg in the second-tier Danish 1st Division. He signed a five-year professional contract on 27 May 2019, after making his first appearances for the Lyngby first-team during the 2018–19 season, where Lyngby would also secure promotion to the Danish Superliga. That season he made ten appearances. Winther soon established himself as a first-team regular in the Superliga, attracting interest from Dutch clubs Ajax and PSV, as well as German and Austrian clubs RB Leipzig and Red Bull Salzburg.

=== FC Augsburg ===
On 5 October 2020, it was confirmed, that Winther had signed a deal until 2025 with German club FC Augsburg. However, he would remain on loan at Lyngby for the 2020–21 season on a loan deal.

Winther returned to Denmark on 31 January 2023, joining Brøndby on a five-month loan deal. He made his debut for the club on 19 February, starting in a 5–2 home win over AC Horsens. He returned to Augsburg at the end of his loan, after making 15 appearances for Brøndby.

On 29 January 2024, Augsburg announced that Winther would spend the remainder of the 2023–24 season on loan at Portuguese Primeira Liga club Estoril Praia.

=== Hammarby ===
On 28 March 2024, Augsburg announced that Winther's loan at Estoril had been prematurely terminated and he had been permanently transferred to Allsvenskan club Hammarby.

== International career ==
Winther made four appearances for the Danish U18 national team. For the Denmark U19 he gained six caps scoring one goal.
