= 2022–23 Bundesliga =

Bundesliga
- Season: 2022–23
- Dates: 5 August 2022 – 27 May 2023
- Champions: Bayern Munich; 32nd Bundesliga title 33rd German title
- Relegated: Schalke 04; Hertha BSC
- Champions League: Bayern Munich; Borussia Dortmund; RB Leipzig; Union Berlin
- Europa League: SC Freiburg; Bayer Leverkusen
- Europa Conference League: Eintracht Frankfurt
- Matches: 306
- Goals: 971 (3.17 per match)
- Top goalscorer: Niclas Füllkrug; Christopher Nkunku (16 goals each)
- Biggest home win: Wolfsburg 6–0 Freiburg; Köln 7–1 Bremen; Dortmund 6–0 Wolfsburg; Munich 6–0 Schalke
- Biggest away win: Bochum 0–7 Munich
- Highest scoring: Munich 6–2 Mainz; Köln 7–1 Bremen; Munich 5–3 Augsburg
- Longest winning run: 8 games Dortmund
- Longest unbeaten run: 13 games Bayern Munich
- Longest winless run: 13 games Hoffenheim
- Longest losing run: 7 games Schalke
- Highest attendance: 81,365; Fifteen games
- Lowest attendance: 17,005; Hoffenheim v Bochum
- Attendance: 12,976,427 (42,407 per match)

The 2022–23 Bundesliga was the 60th season of the Bundesliga, Germany's premier football competition. It began on 5 August 2022 and concluded on 27 May 2023.

Bayern Munich were the ten-time consecutive defending champions and retained their title.

Going into the final match-day on 27 May, Borussia Dortmund needed a home win over Mainz 05 to clinch the title, irrespective of Bayern's result. However, they drew 2–2, and Jamal Musiala's late winner against 1. FC Köln sealed the eleventh consecutive Bundesliga for Bayern. This was the first time since the 1999–2000 season, when Bayern pipped Bayer Leverkusen on goal difference, that the title was decided by a tiebreaker and a team won the title after starting the day second.

Schalke 04 and Hertha BSC were relegated to the 2. Bundesliga.

Bayern Munich celebrated a double championship when both the women's team and the men's team won the top national football leagues within two days.

== Summary ==
The 2022–23 Bundesliga was contested by 18 teams, including promoted sides FC Schalke 04 and SV Werder Bremen. Both promoted teams had recently ended long spells in the Bundesliga by being relegated together at the end of the 2020–21 season.

The fixtures were announced on 17 June 2022. As the 2022 FIFA World Cup was held between 20 November and 18 December 2022 in Qatar, the 2022–23 season featured an extended winter break. As national team players had to be released by their clubs on 14 November 2022, the last Bundesliga matchday before the break was played from 11–13 November (matchday 15). The league resumed ten weeks later on 20 January 2023.

=== First half ===
After winning their first match 6–1 at Eintracht Frankfurt, the reigning champions FC Bayern Munich were at the top of the table. They were replaced by SC Freiburg after matchday 5, before 1. FC Union Berlin took over the top of the table for the first time in its Bundesliga history on the sixth matchday. Union Berlin remained at the top of the table for seven weeks until a 5–0 loss to Bayer 04 Leverkusen, which allowed Bayern Munich to regain the lead. Bayern were the only team to lose only once in the first half of the season (0–1 against FC Augsburg) and had a ten-match unbeaten run. With a gap of three points to Union Berlin, Bayern became Herbstmeister and won four more of their games, including a seven-goal defeat of VfL Bochum. Bayern scored the most goals (51) and also conceded the fewest goals (15) in the first 17 matchdays. UEFA Champions League and Europa League participants Frankfurt and RB Leipzig as well as Freiburg and Borussia Dortmund, who had dropped to 8th place in the meantime, were within striking distance.

In addition to Munich's 6–2 win against Mainz, another game in the first half ended with eight goals, namely Cologne's 7–1 win against newly promoted Bremen. After Robert Lewandowski, who was the top goal scorer in the last five seasons in a row, left the Bundesliga, French striker Christopher Nkunku was the top scorer in the first 17 games with 12 goals for Leipzig; Germany's top scorer was Niclas Füllkrug, who only scored one fewer goal.

Bochum finished last in the table between matchdays 3 and 10 after winning just one point in the first eight games. They were followed by FC Schalke 04, who only managed to collect nine points in the first half of the season and thus performed just as they did in the 2020–21 season. In addition, the team only scored 14 goals and therefore not even one per game on average. In contrast, they conceded 41 goals in the first half of the season.

=== Second half ===
At the beginning of the year, Borussia Dortmund managed a series of eight wins in eight games. On matchday 21, BVB equalized the gap to leaders Bayern Munich. Because Union Berlin also had 43 points at that point, three clubs were tied at the top of the table, which has never happened so late in a season since the three-point rule was introduced. While the team from Berlin lost touch a little after a 0–3 defeat in Munich, Dortmund was able to win on matchday 25 with a 6–1 win over Cologne and the simultaneous Bayern defeat (1–2 in Leverkusen) allowed them to take the lead in the table for the first time. A few days later, Bayern Munich coach Julian Nagelsmann was put on leave and Thomas Tuchel was introduced as his successor. Then BVB lost the direct duel with Bayern 2–4, after which they fell back to 2nd place. Dortmund went undefeated as a result, while Bayern lost 1–3 to Mainz 05 on matchday 29 and RB Leipzig on matchday 33. Both teams have each won one of their games 6–0 (BVB again Wolfsburg, Bayern against Schalke 04) and were two points apart going into the final matchday, with second-placed Bayern Munich having a 14-plus goal difference.

After six clubs fired their coaches in the first half of the season, TSG 1899 Hoffenheim followed suit after matchday 19 as the first club in the second half of the season. They parted ways with their coach André Breitenreiter at the beginning of February 2023 after they had not won nine times in a row from the 11th matchday and had thus slipped from fourth to 13th place, only three points ahead of the relegation play-off and five points ahead of the first relegation rank. After six games in a row without a defeat (ten points, one goal conceded), FC Schalke 04 left the last place in the table on the 23rd matchday. At that point, four teams at the bottom of the table (Stuttgart, Hoffenheim, Schalke and Bochum) each had 19 points and Hertha BSC were also almost level with 20 points. There has never been such a close standings in the history of the Bundesliga so late in the season. After Schalke and Bochum, Hoffenheim and Stuttgart finished bottom of the table one after the other, so that there were four different bottom teams on four consecutive match days. During the second half of the season, up to and including the 31st matchday, those teams at bottom of the table scored more points than the teams on top of the table (25:24). During matchday 25 to 30, the league leaders won only once (FC Bayern 1–0 at SC Freiburg). With a 1–1 draw against Hertha BSC, VfL Bochum, who were also threatened with relegation, sealed the relegation of the Berliners from the Bundesliga on matchday 33, after they were last promoted in 2013. Apart from Bochum with 32 points, Stuttgart, FC Schalke (31 points) and FC Augsburg (34 points), who have the same number of points, are fighting against relegation on the last day of the game. Ultimately, FC Schalke went straight down as 17th in the table after a 4–2 defeat at RB Leipzig. Stuttgart could not get more than 1–1 against Hoffenheim and ended up taking the relegation playoff place because Bochum won their home game against Leverkusen with 3–0. Augsburg lost 2–0 in Mönchengladbach but still finished 15th due to the draw in Stuttgart.

In the championship fight, the most exciting duel since the 2000–01 season was looming. With a win in the home game against Mainz, BVB could have become champion on their own. A draw would not have been enough for the championship if Bayern had won due to the worse goal difference.

On the last day of the season, FC Bayern took a 1–0 lead early on in Cologne. A short time later, Mainz made it 1–0 in Dortmund. In the provisional table, FC Bayern had passed BVB. A penalty kick just two minutes later to make it possible to make it 1–1 was missed. Mainz made it 2–0 10 minutes later. Although BVB ran up, whipped up by the 80,000 of their own fans, nothing happened until the middle of the second half. In the 69th minute, Dortmund scored a goal to make it 1–2. In the 81st minute, the Cologne team was awarded a penalty, which they converted to make it 1–1. At this point, BVB was again the leader of the table despite being behind against Mainz. However, Bayern made it 2–1 in the 89th minute and passed BVB again. Although Dortmund still equalized in injury time, the winning goal, which in turn would have meant Dortmund's title win, did not materialize.

== Teams ==
Locations of the 2022–23 Bundesliga teams

A total of 18 teams participated in the 2022–23 edition of the Bundesliga.

=== Team changes ===
Promoted from 2021–22 2. Bundesliga	Relegated from 2021–22 Bundesliga
Schalke 04; Werder Bremen	Arminia Bielefeld; Greuther Fürth

=== Stadiums and locations ===
Team	Location	Stadium	Capacity	Ref.
FC Augsburg	Augsburg	WWK Arena	30,660	
Hertha BSC	Berlin	Olympiastadion	74,649	
Union Berlin	Berlin	Stadion An der Alten Försterei	22,012	
VfL Bochum	Bochum	Vonovia Ruhrstadion	27,599	
Werder Bremen	Bremen	Wohninvest Weserstadion	42,100	
Borussia Dortmund	Dortmund	Signal Iduna Park	81,365	
Eintracht Frankfurt	Frankfurt	Deutsche Bank Park	51,500	
SC Freiburg	Freiburg im Breisgau	Europa-Park Stadion	34,700	
1899 Hoffenheim	Sinsheim	PreZero Arena	30,150	
1. FC Köln	Cologne	RheinEnergieStadion	49,698	
RB Leipzig	Leipzig	Red Bull Arena	47,069	
Bayer Leverkusen	Leverkusen	BayArena	30,210	
Mainz 05	Mainz	Mewa Arena	34,000	
Borussia Mönchengladbach	Mönchengladbach	Borussia-Park	54,057	
Bayern Munich	Munich	Allianz Arena	75,000	
Schalke 04	Gelsenkirchen	Veltins-Arena	62,271	
VfB Stuttgart	Stuttgart	Mercedes-Benz Arena	60,449	
VfL Wolfsburg	Wolfsburg	Volkswagen Arena	30,000	

=== Personnel and kits ===
Team	Manager	Captain	Kit manufacturer	Shirt sponsor	
Team	Manager	Captain	Kit manufacturer	Front	Sleeve
FC Augsburg	(Germany) Enrico Maaßen	(Netherlands) Jeffrey Gouweleeuw	Nike	WWK Versicherung	Siegmund
Hertha BSC	(Hungary) Pál Dárdai	(Germany) Marvin Plattenhardt	Nike	Autohero	CG Elementum
Union Berlin	(Switzerland) Urs Fischer	(Austria) Christopher Trimmel	Adidas	wefox	Comedy Central/Aroundtown (in cup and UEFA matches)
VfL Bochum	(Germany) Thomas Letsch	(France) Anthony Losilla	Mizuno	Vonovia	Viactiv Betriebskrankenkasse/AIC Service & Call Center (in cup matches)
Werder Bremen	(Germany) Ole Werner	(Austria) Marco Friedl	Umbro	Green Legend	Ammerländer
Borussia Dortmund	(Germany) Edin Terzić	(Germany) Marco Reus	Puma	1&1/Evonik (in cup and UEFA matches)	GLS Group
Eintracht Frankfurt	(Austria) Oliver Glasner	(Germany) Sebastian Rode	Nike	Indeed.com	dpd/JOKA (in UEFA matches)
SC Freiburg	(Germany) Christian Streich	(Germany) Christian Günter	Nike	Cazoo	BABISTA
1899 Hoffenheim	(United States) Pellegrino Matarazzo	(Germany) Oliver Baumann	Joma	SAP	hep global
1. FC Köln	(Germany) Steffen Baumgart	(Germany) Jonas Hector	Hummel	REWE	DEVK/Deutsche Telekom (in cup and UEFA matches)
RB Leipzig	(Germany) Marco Rose	(Hungary) Péter Gulácsi	Nike	Red Bull	AOC | Die Stadtentwickler/Veganz (in cup and UEFA matches)
Bayer Leverkusen	(Spain) Xabi Alonso	(Finland) Lukáš Hrádecký	Castore	Barmenia Versicherungen	Trive/Kumho Tyres (in cup matches)
Mainz 05	(Denmark) Bo Svensson	(Switzerland) Silvan Widmer	Kappa	Kömmerling	fb88.com/LOTTO Rheinland-Pfalz (in cup matches)
Borussia Mönchengladbach	(Germany) Daniel Farke	(Germany) Lars Stindl	Puma	flatex	Sonepar
Bayern Munich	(Germany) Thomas Tuchel	(Germany) Manuel Neuer	Adidas	Deutsche Telekom	Qatar Airways/Audi (in cup and UEFA matches)
Schalke 04	(Germany) Thomas Reis	(Germany) Simon Terodde	Adidas	MeinAuto.de	Harfid
VfB Stuttgart	(Germany) Sebastian Hoeneß	(Japan) Wataru Endo	Jako	Mercedes-Benz Bank	Mercedes-EQ
VfL Wolfsburg	(Croatia) Niko Kovač	(Germany) Maximilian Arnold	Nike	Volkswagen/ID.3	Linglong Tire

=== Managerial changes ===
Team	Outgoing	Manner	Exit date		Position in table	Incoming	Incoming date		Ref.
Team	Outgoing	Manner	Announced on	Departed on	Position in table	Incoming	Announced on	Arrived on	Ref.
Schalke 04	(Germany) Mike Büskens (interim)	End of caretaker spell	7 March 2022	30 June 2022	Pre-season	(Germany) Frank Kramer	7 June 2022	1 July 2022	
Hertha BSC	(Germany) Felix Magath (interim)	End of caretaker spell	13 March 2022	30 June 2022	Pre-season	(Germany) Sandro Schwarz	2 June 2022	1 July 2022	
FC Augsburg	(Germany) Markus Weinzierl	End of contract	14 May 2022	30 June 2022	Pre-season	(Germany) Enrico Maaßen	8 June 2022	1 July 2022	
Borussia Mönchengladbach	(Austria) Adi Hütter	Mutual consent	14 May 2022	30 June 2022	Pre-season	(Germany) Daniel Farke	4 June 2022	1 July 2022	
VfL Wolfsburg	(Germany) Florian Kohfeldt	Mutual consent	15 May 2022	30 June 2022	Pre-season	(Croatia) Niko Kovač	24 May 2022	1 July 2022	
1899 Hoffenheim	(Germany) Sebastian Hoeneß	Mutual consent	17 May 2022	30 June 2022	Pre-season	(Germany) André Breitenreiter	24 May 2022	1 July 2022	
Borussia Dortmund	(Germany) Marco Rose	Mutual consent	20 May 2022	30 June 2022	Pre-season	(Germany) Edin Terzić	23 May 2022	1 July 2022	
RB Leipzig	(Italy) Domenico Tedesco	Sacked	7 September 2022		11th	(Germany) Marco Rose	8 September 2022		
VfL Bochum	(Germany) Thomas Reis	Sacked	12 September 2022		18th	(Germany) Heiko Butscher (interim)	12 September 2022		
VfL Bochum	(Germany) Heiko Butscher (interim)	End of caretaker spell	22 September 2022		18th	(Germany) Thomas Letsch	22 September 2022		
Bayer Leverkusen	(Switzerland) Gerardo Seoane	Sacked	5 October 2022		17th	(Spain) Xabi Alonso	5 October 2022		
VfB Stuttgart	(United States) Pellegrino Matarazzo	Sacked	10 October 2022		17th	(Germany) Michael Wimmer (interim)	11 October 2022		
Schalke 04	(Germany) Frank Kramer	Sacked	19 October 2022		17th	(Germany) Matthias Kreutzer (interim)	20 October 2022		
Schalke 04	(Germany) Matthias Kreutzer (interim)	End of caretaker spell	27 October 2022		18th	(Germany) Thomas Reis	27 October 2022		
VfB Stuttgart	(Germany) Michael Wimmer (interim)	End of caretaker spell	5 December 2022		16th	(Germany) Bruno Labbadia	5 December 2022		
1899 Hoffenheim	(Germany) André Breitenreiter	Sacked	6 February 2023		14th	(United States) Pellegrino Matarazzo	8 February 2023		
Bayern Munich	(Germany) Julian Nagelsmann	Sacked	24 March 2023		2nd	(Germany) Thomas Tuchel	24 March 2023		
VfB Stuttgart	(Germany) Bruno Labbadia	Sacked	3 April 2023		18th	(Germany) Sebastian Hoeneß	3 April 2023		
Hertha BSC	(Germany) Sandro Schwarz	Sacked	16 April 2023		18th	(Hungary) Pál Dárdai	16 April 2023		

== League table ==
Pos	Team	Pld	W	D	L	GF	GA	GD	Pts	Qualification or relegation
1	Bayern Munich (C)	34	21	8	5	92	38	+54	71	Qualification for the Champions League group stage
2	Borussia Dortmund	34	22	5	7	83	44	+39	71	Qualification for the Champions League group stage
3	RB Leipzig	34	20	6	8	64	41	+23	66	Qualification for the Champions League group stage
4	Union Berlin	34	18	8	8	51	38	+13	62	Qualification for the Champions League group stage
5	SC Freiburg	34	17	8	9	51	44	+7	59	Qualification for the Europa League group stage (Note: Since the 2022–23 DFB-Pokal winners, RB Leipzig, qualified for the Champions League based on league position, the Europa League group stage spot was passed to the sixth-placed team, and the Europa Conference League play-off round spot was passed to the seventh-placed team.)
6	Bayer Leverkusen	34	14	8	12	57	49	+8	50	Qualification for the Europa League group stage
7	Eintracht Frankfurt	34	13	11	10	58	52	+6	50	Qualification for the Europa Conference League play-off round
8	VfL Wolfsburg	34	13	10	11	57	48	+9	49	
9	Mainz 05	34	12	10	12	54	55	−1	46	
10	Borussia Mönchengladbach	34	11	10	13	52	55	−3	43	
11	1. FC Köln	34	10	12	12	49	54	−5	42	
12	1899 Hoffenheim	34	10	6	18	48	57	−9	36	
13	Werder Bremen	34	10	6	18	51	64	−13	36	
14	VfL Bochum	34	10	5	19	40	72	−32	35	
15	FC Augsburg	34	9	7	18	42	63	−21	34	
16	VfB Stuttgart (O)	34	7	12	15	45	57	−12	33	Qualification for the relegation play-offs
17	Schalke 04 (R)	34	7	10	17	35	71	−36	31	Relegation to 2. Bundesliga
18	Hertha BSC (R)	34	7	8	19	42	69	−27	29	Relegation to 2. Bundesliga

Source: DFB
Rules for classification: 1) Points; 2) Goal difference; 3) Goals scored; 4) Head-to-head results; 5) Head-to-head away goals scored; 6) Away goals scored; 7) Play-off.
(C) Champions; (O) Play-off winners; (R) Relegated

== Results ==
Home \ Away	AUG	BSC	UNB	BOC	BRE	DOR	FRA	FRE	HOF	KÖL	LEI	LEV	MAI	MÖN	MUN	SCH	STU	WOL
FC Augsburg	—	0–2	1–0	0–1	2–1	0–3	1–2	0–4	1–0	1–3	3–3	1–0	1–2	1–0	1–0	1–1	1–1	1–1
Hertha BSC	2–0	—	0–2	1–1	2–4	0–1	1–1	2–2	1–1	2–0	0–1	2–2	1–1	4–1	2–3	2–1	2–1	0–5
Union Berlin	2–2	3–1	—	1–1	1–0	2–0	2–0	4–2	3–1	0–0	2–1	0–0	2–1	2–1	1–1	0–0	3–0	2–0
VfL Bochum	3–2	3–1	2–1	—	0–2	1–1	3–0	0–2	5–2	1–1	1–0	3–0	1–2	2–1	0–7	0–2	2–3	1–5
Werder Bremen	0–1	1–0	1–2	3–0	—	0–2	3–4	1–2	1–2	1–1	1–2	2–3	0–2	5–1	1–2	2–1	2–2	2–1
Borussia Dortmund	4–3	4–1	2–1	3–0	2–3	—	4–0	5–1	1–0	6–1	2–1	1–0	2–2	5–2	2–2	1–0	5–0	6–0
Eintracht Frankfurt	1–1	3–0	2–0	1–1	2–0	1–2	—	2–1	4–2	1–1	4–0	5–1	3–0	1–1	1–6	3–0	1–1	0–1
SC Freiburg	3–1	1–1	4–1	1–0	2–0	1–3	1–1	—	2–1	2–0	0–1	1–1	2–1	0–0	0–1	4–0	2–1	2–0
1899 Hoffenheim	1–0	3–1	4–2	3–2	1–2	0–1	3–1	0–0	—	1–3	1–3	1–3	4–1	1–4	0–2	2–0	2–2	1–2
1. FC Köln	3–2	5–2	0–1	0–2	7–1	3–2	3–0	0–1	1–1	—	0–0	1–2	1–1	0–0	1–2	3–1	0–0	0–2
RB Leipzig	3–2	3–2	1–2	4–0	2–1	3–0	2–1	3–1	1–0	2–2	—	2–0	0–3	3–0	1–1	4–2	2–1	2–0
Bayer Leverkusen	1–2	4–1	5–0	2–0	1–1	0–2	3–1	2–3	0–3	1–2	2–0	—	2–3	2–2	2–1	4–0	2–0	2–2
Mainz 05	3–1	1–1	0–0	5–2	2–2	1–2	1–1	1–1	1–0	5–0	1–1	0–3	—	4–0	3–1	2–3	1–4	0–3
Borussia Mönchengladbach	2–0	1–0	0–1	2–0	2–2	4–2	1–3	0–0	3–1	5–2	3–0	2–3	0–1	—	3–2	0–0	3–1	2–0
Bayern Munich	5–3	2–0	3–0	3–0	6–1	4–2	1–1	5–0	1–1	1–1	1–3	4–0	6–2	1–1	—	6–0	2–2	2–0
Schalke 04	2–3	5–2	1–6	3–1	2–1	2–2	2–2	0–2	0–3	0–0	1–6	0–3	1–0	2–2	0–2	—	2–1	0–0
VfB Stuttgart	2–1	2–1	0–1	4–1	0–2	3–3	1–3	0–1	1–1	3–0	1–1	1–1	1–1	2–1	1–2	1–1	—	0–1
VfL Wolfsburg	2–2	1–2	1–1	4–0	2–2	2–0	2–2	6–0	2–1	2–4	0–3	0–0	3–0	2–2	2–4	0–0	3–2	—

Source: DFB
Legend: Blue = home team win; Yellow = draw; Red = away team win.

== Relegation play-offs ==
The relegation play-offs took place on 1 and 5 June 2023. The away goals rule was no longer used.

=== Overview ===
Team 1	Agg.	Team 2	1st leg	2nd leg
VfB Stuttgart (B)	6–1	Hamburger SV (2B)	3–0	3–1

=== Matches ===
All times Central European Summer Time (UTC+2)

1 June 2023
20:45

VfB Stuttgart	3–0	Hamburger SV
Mavropanos 1'; Vagnoman 51'; Guirassy 54'	Report

Mercedes-Benz Arena, Stuttgart
Attendance: 47,500
Referee: Tobias Welz
5 June 2023
20:45

Hamburger SV	1–3	VfB Stuttgart
Kittel 6'	Report	Millot 48', 64'; Silas 90+7'

Volksparkstadion, Hamburg
Attendance: 55,500
Referee: Bastian Dankert

VfB Stuttgart won 6–1 on aggregate, and therefore both clubs remained in their respective leagues.

== Statistics ==
=== Top goalscorers ===
Rank	Player	Club	Goals
1	(Germany) Niclas Füllkrug	Werder Bremen	16
1	(France) Christopher Nkunku	RB Leipzig	16
3	(Italy) Vincenzo Grifo	SC Freiburg	15
3	(France) Randal Kolo Muani	Eintracht Frankfurt	15
5	(Germany) Serge Gnabry	Bayern Munich	14
6	(France) Marcus Thuram	Borussia Mönchengladbach	13
7	(Germany) Marvin Ducksch	Werder Bremen	12
7	(Germany) Jonas Hofmann	Borussia Mönchengladbach	12
7	(Croatia) Andrej Kramarić	1899 Hoffenheim	12
7	(Germany) Jamal Musiala	Bayern Munich	12

=== Hat-tricks ===
Player	Club	Against	Result	Date
(Germany) Serge Gnabry	Bayern Munich	Werder Bremen	6–1 (H)	8 November 2022
(Italy) Vincenzo Grifo	SC Freiburg	Union Berlin	4–1 (H)	13 November 2022
(Austria) Karim Onisiwo	Mainz 05	VfL Bochum	5–2 (H)	28 January 2023
(Germany) Marvin Ducksch	Werder Bremen	Hertha BSC	4–2 (A)	22 April 2023

=== Clean sheets ===
Rank	Player	Club	Clean sheets
1	(Netherlands) Mark Flekken	SC Freiburg	13
2	(Belgium) Koen Casteels	VfL Wolfsburg	12
3	(Switzerland) Gregor Kobel	Borussia Dortmund	11
3	(Denmark) Frederik Rønnow	Union Berlin	11
5	(Finland) Lukáš Hrádecký	Bayer Leverkusen	9
6	(Switzerland) Yann Sommer	Borussia Mönchengladbach; Bayern Munich	8
7	(Germany) Janis Blaswich	RB Leipzig	7
7	(Germany) Robin Zentner	Mainz 05	7
9	(Germany) Marvin Schwäbe	1. FC Köln	6
9	(Germany) Kevin Trapp	Eintracht Frankfurt	6

== Awards ==
=== Monthly awards ===
Month	Player of the Month		Rookie of the Month		Goal of the Month		Ref.
Month	Player	Club	Player	Club	Player	Club	Ref.
August	(Suriname) Sheraldo Becker	Union Berlin	(England) Lee Buchanan	Werder Bremen	(Germany) Leroy Sané	Bayern Munich	
September	(Germany) Niclas Füllkrug	Werder Bremen	(Germany) Tom Krauß	Schalke 04	(Germany) Marco Richter	Hertha BSC	
October	(Germany) Niclas Füllkrug	Werder Bremen	(France) Junior Dina Ebimbe	Eintracht Frankfurt	(Germany) Leroy Sané	Bayern Munich	
November	(Germany) Serge Gnabry	Bayern Munich	(France) Junior Dina Ebimbe	Eintracht Frankfurt	(Germany) Julian Brandt	Borussia Dortmund	
January	(Germany) Julian Brandt	Borussia Dortmund	(Germany) Karim Adeyemi	Borussia Dortmund	(Germany) Joshua Kimmich	Bayern Munich	
February	(Germany) Julian Brandt	Borussia Dortmund	(Germany) Tom Krauß	Schalke 04	(Germany) Marco Reus	Borussia Dortmund	
March	(Portugal) Raphaël Guerreiro	Borussia Dortmund	(Germany) Henning Matriciani	Schalke 04	(France) Benjamin Pavard	Bayern Munich	
April	(Netherlands) Donyell Malen	Borussia Dortmund	(Netherlands) Matthijs de Ligt	Bayern Munich	(Netherlands) Matthijs de Ligt	Bayern Munich	
May	—N/a		—N/a		(Germany) Jamal Musiala	Bayern Munich	

=== Annual awards ===
Award	Winner	Club	Ref.
Player of the Season	(England) Jude Bellingham	Borussia Dortmund	
Rookie of the Season	(Germany) Karim Adeyemi	Borussia Dortmund	
Goal of the Season	(Netherlands) Matthijs de Ligt	Bayern Munich	

=== Team of the season ===
==== kicker ====
Pos.	Player	Club	Ref.
GK	(Switzerland) Gregor Kobel	Borussia Dortmund	
DF	(Netherlands) Jeremie Frimpong	Bayer Leverkusen	
DF	(Germany) Matthias Ginter	SC Freiburg	
DF	(Netherlands) Matthijs de Ligt	Bayern Munich	
DF	(Portugal) Raphaël Guerreiro	Borussia Dortmund	
MF	(Italy) Vincenzo Grifo	SC Freiburg	
MF	(Germany) Jamal Musiala	Bayern Munich	
MF	(Austria) Xaver Schlager	RB Leipzig	
FW	(France) Randal Kolo Muani	Eintracht Frankfurt	
FW	(Germany) Niclas Füllkrug	Werder Bremen	
FW	(France) Christopher Nkunku	RB Leipzig	

==== EA Sports ====
Pos.	Player	Club	Ref.
GK	(Switzerland) Gregor Kobel	Borussia Dortmund	
DF	(Netherlands) Jeremie Frimpong	Bayer Leverkusen	
DF	(Netherlands) Matthijs de Ligt	Bayern Munich	
DF	(Germany) Nico Schlotterbeck	Borussia Dortmund	
DF	(Canada) Alphonso Davies	Bayern Munich	
MF	(Germany) Julian Brandt	Borussia Dortmund	
MF	(England) Jude Bellingham	Borussia Dortmund	
MF	(Germany) Jamal Musiala	Bayern Munich	
FW	(France) Moussa Diaby	Bayer Leverkusen	
FW	(France) Randal Kolo Muani	Eintracht Frankfurt	
FW	(Germany) Niclas Füllkrug	Werder Bremen	

== Attendances ==
Rank	Team	Home games	Average attendance
1	Borussia Dortmund	17	81,228
2	Bayern Munich	17	75,000
3	Schalke 04	17	61,133
4	Hertha BSC	17	53,670
5	Borussia Mönchengladbach	17	52,438
6	Eintracht Frankfurt	17	50,100
7	1. FC Köln	17	49,694
8	VfB Stuttgart	17	46,312
9	RB Leipzig	17	45,961
10	Werder Bremen	17	41,620
11	SC Freiburg	17	34,012
12	Mainz 05	17	29,070
13	Bayer Leverkusen	17	28,609
14	FC Augsburg	17	27,956
15	VfL Wolfsburg	17	25,394
16	VfL Bochum	17	25,318
17	TSG Hoffenheim	17	24,625
18	Union Berlin	17	21,798
