= 2022–23 FC Schalke 04 season =

Schalke 04
2022–23 season
- Managing board: Bernd Schröder; Peter Knäbel; Christina Rühl-Hamers
- Head coach: Frank Kramer (until 19 October); Matthias Kreutzer (interim, from 20 to 27 October); Thomas Reis (from 27 October)
- Stadium: Veltins-Arena
- Bundesliga: 17th (relegated)
- DFB-Pokal: Second round
- Top goalscorer: League: Marius Bülter (11); All: Marius Bülter (11)
Home colours	Away colours	Third colours

The 2022–23 FC Schalke 04 season was the 119th season in the football club's history and first consecutive and 54th overall season in the topflight of German football, the Bundesliga, having been promoted from the 2. Bundesliga in 2022. In addition to the domestic league, Schalke also participated in this season's edition of the domestic cup, the DFB-Pokal. This was the 22nd season for Schalke in the Veltins-Arena, located in Gelsenkirchen, North Rhine-Westphalia. The season covers a period from 1 July 2022 to 30 June 2023. Schalke were relegated on the final matchday of the season.

== Season summary ==
On 7 June 2022, Schalke appointed Frank Kramer as head coach. As a result of the club's financial problems, most of the players who were essential for the success in the previous season, like Ko Itakura, could not be kept, and Schalke struggled to be competitive at the beginning of the 2022–23 season. Following a series of losses, including a 1–5 against Hoffenheim, Kramer was relieved of his duties on 19 October 2022. At the time, Schalke was 17th in the Bundesliga after ten matchdays. Matthias Kreutzer took over as caretaker manager. A week after Kramer's dismissal, on 26 October 2022, sporting director Rouven Schröder also announced his instant resignation.

On 27 October 2022, Thomas Reis was named as Schalke's new head coach. The first match under Reis, against SC Freiburg, was lost 0–2, marking Schalke's seventh consecutive loss. After the game, commentators like Huub Stevens praised the team for its better organization, compared to previous matches. Schalke finished the first half of the 2022–23 Bundesliga season in 18th and last position in the table, with just nine points to their name. Following a 1–6 loss against RB Leipzig on match day 17, the club noticeably improved, especially in the defense. Between match days 18 and 21, Schalke played 0–0 four times in a row, a new Bundesliga record. The following two matches were won, and on 4 March 2023, Schalke left the last place in the table for the first time since October 2022.

On 19 February 2023, four people were seriously injured when a group of about 100 people, assumed to be supporters of Schalke's rivals Rot-Weiss Essen and Borussia Dortmund, attacked a group of Schalke supporters with baseball bats and screwdrivers. The incident sparked fears over the upcoming derby against Dortmund. This came less than three weeks after the police had uncovered a possible plot by radical Dortmund supporters, who had tried to hide razor blades behind stickers in the stadium ahead of Dortmund's match against Mainz. In 2014, the police had warned of a similar danger ahead of the derby, after razor blades were found in the stadium hidden behind anti-Schalke stickers. On 11 March 2023, in the 100th derby between the two clubs, Schalke played 2–2 against Borussia Dortmund, who were in second place at the time. This ended Dortmund's streak of eight wins in a row. The police called the match "extremely peaceful", which they attributed to the successful police operation. Media reports noted that several people had been injured by illegal pyrotechnics, with one woman suffering an eye injury. At least one man was taken to the hospital after an intoxicated supporter of the opposing team had bitten off his earlobe. On the final match-day of the 2022–23 season, Schalke lost 4–2 against RB Leipzig. They finished 17th in the league table, and were relegated again to the 2. Bundesliga.

== Players ==
Note: Players' appearances and goals only in their Schalke career.

As of end of 2022–23 season.

No.	Player	Nat.	Pos.	Age	Contract		League		Total	
No.	Player	Nat.	Pos.	Age	began	ends	Apps	Goals	Apps	Goals
Goalkeepers
1	Ralf Fährmann	(Germany)	GK	34	Jul 2011	Jun 2025	218	0	279	0
13	Alexander Schwolow	(Germany)	GK	31	Jul 2022	Jun 2023	23	0	25	0
28	Justin Heekeren	(Germany)	GK	22	Jul 2022	Jun 2025	0	0	0	0
34	Michael Langer	(Austria)	GK	38	Aug 2017	Jun 2023	5	0	5	0
Defenders
2	Thomas Ouwejan	(Netherlands)	DF	27	Jul 2021	Jun 2024	45	3	49	3
3	Leo Greiml	(Austria)	DF	22	Jul 2022	Jun 2025	7	0	7	0
4	Maya Yoshida	(Japan)	DF	34	Jul 2022	Jun 2023	29	0	31	0
5	Sepp van den Berg	(Netherlands)	DF	21	Aug 2022	Jun 2023	9	1	9	1
15	Timothée Kolodziejczak	(France)	DF	31	Oct 2022	Jun 2023	1	0	1	0
18	Jere Uronen	(Finland)	DF	28	Jan 2023	Jun 2023	11	0	11	0
22	Ibrahima Cissé	(Mali)	DF	22	Jul 2022	Jun 2026	0	0	0	0
25	Moritz Jenz	(Germany)	DF	24	Jan 2023	Jun 2023	11	0	11	0
27	Cédric Brunner	(Switzerland)	DF	29	Jul 2022	Jun 2024	28	0	29	0
35	Marcin Kamiński	(Poland)	DF	31	Jul 2021	Jun 2023	39	4	42	5
41	Henning Matriciani	(Germany)	DF	23	Sep 2021	Jun 2024	35	0	36	0
Midfielders
6	Tom Krauß	(Germany)	MF	22	Jul 2022	Jun 2023	32	2	33	2
8	Danny Latza (captain)	(Germany)	MF	33	Jul 2021	Jun 2024	38	2	40	2
10	Rodrigo Zalazar	(Uruguay)	MF	23	Aug 2021	Jun 2026	52	7	55	9
21	Niklas Tauer	(Germany)	MF	22	Jan 2023	Jun 2024	0	0	0	0
23	Mehmet-Can Aydın	(Turkey)	MF	21	Jun 2021	Jun 2025	40	1	43	1
24	Dominick Drexler	(Germany)	MF	33	Jul 2021	Jun 2024	50	7	53	10
29	Tobias Mohr	(Germany)	MF	27	Jul 2022	Jun 2025	18	0	20	0
30	Alex Král	(Czech Republic)	MF	25	Jul 2022	Jun 2023	29	0	31	0
33	Éder Balanta	(Colombia)	MF	30	Jan 2023	Jun 2023	6	0	6	0
Forwards
9	Simon Terodde	(Germany)	FW	35	Jul 2021	Jun 2023	62	35	65	35
11	Marius Bülter	(Germany)	FW	30	Jul 2021	Jun 2024	65	21	69	23
19	Kenan Karaman	(Turkey)	FW	29	Sep 2022	Jun 2025	21	1	22	1
20	Tim Skarke	(Germany)	FW	26	Jan 2023	Jun 2023	9	1	9	1
26	Michael Frey	(Switzerland)	FW	28	Jan 2023	Jun 2023	15	0	15	0
38	Sōichirō Kōzuki	(Japan)	FW	22	Jan 2023	Jun 2025	5	1	5	1
40	Sebastian Polter	(Germany)	FW	32	Jul 2022	Jun 2025	19	2	21	2

== Transfers ==
=== In ===
Player	Nat.	Pos.	From	Type	Window	Ends	Transfer fee	Ref.
Michael Frey	(Switzerland)	FW	(Belgium) Royal Antwerp	Loan (option to buy)	Winter	2023	—	
Moritz Jenz	(Germany)	DF	(France) Lorient	Loan (option to buy) (Note: €200,000 loan fee. Obligation to buy for €4,000,000 if Schalke avoid relegation in this season.)	Winter	2023	—	
Tim Skarke	(Germany)	FW	(Germany) Union Berlin	Loan (option to buy)	Winter	2023	—	
Jere Uronen	(Finland)	DF	(France) Brest	Loan (option to buy)	Winter	2023	—	
Éder Balanta	(Colombia)	FW	(Belgium) Club Brugge	Loan	Winter	2023	—	
Niklas Tauer	(Germany)	MF	(Germany) Mainz 05	Loan	Winter	2024	—	
Sōichirō Kōzuki	(Japan)	MF	(Germany) Schalke 04 II	Promoted	Winter	2025	—	
Timothée Kolodziejczak	(France)	DF	Free agent	End of contract	Season (md 10)	2023	—	
Thomas Ouwejan	(Netherlands)	DF	(Netherlands) AZ	Transfer (Note: Player was previously loaned, Schalke exercised an option or obligation to buy.)	Summer	2024	€2,000,000	
Rodrigo Zalazar	(Uruguay)	MF	(Germany) Eintracht Frankfurt	Transfer	Summer	2026	€1,800,000	
Sebastian Polter	(Germany)	FW	(Germany) VfL Bochum	Transfer	Summer	2025	€1,500,000	
Tobias Mohr	(Germany)	MF	(Germany) 1. FC Heidenheim	Transfer	Summer	2025	€1,100,000	
Florent Mollet	(France)	MF	(France) Montpellier	Transfer	Summer	2025	€500,000	
Marvin Pieringer	(Germany)	FW	(Germany) SC Freiburg	Transfer	Summer	2024	€500,000	
Justin Heekeren	(Germany)	GK	(Germany) Rot-Weiß Oberhausen	Transfer	Summer	2025	€180,000	
Kenan Karaman	(Turkey)	FW	(Turkey) Beşiktaş	Transfer	Summer	2025	Free	
Cédric Brunner	(Switzerland)	DF	(Germany) Arminia Bielefeld	End of contract	Summer	2024	—	
Ibrahima Cissé	(Mali)	DF	(Belgium) Gent	End of contract	Summer	2026	—	
Leo Greiml	(Austria)	DF	(Austria) Rapid Wien	End of contract	Summer	2025	—	
Jordan Larsson	(Sweden)	FW	(Russia) Spartak Moscow	End of contract	Summer	2025	—	
Maya Yoshida	(Japan)	DF	(Italy) Sampdoria	End of contract	Summer	2023	—	
Tom Krauß	(Germany)	MF	(Germany) RB Leipzig	Loan (option to buy) (Note: €600,000 loan fee. Obligation to buy for €3,000,000 if Schalke avoid relegation in this season.)	Summer	2023	—	
Alex Král	(Czech Republic)	MF	(Russia) Spartak Moscow	Loan (Note: Player has suspended his contract with Spartak Moscow for the 2022–23 season using FIFA's regulations related to the Russian invasion of Ukraine.)	Summer	2023	—	
Alexander Schwolow	(Germany)	GK	(Germany) Hertha BSC	Loan	Summer	2023	—	
Sepp van den Berg	(Netherlands)	DF	(England) Liverpool	Loan	Summer	2023	—	
Timo Becker	(Germany)	DF	(Germany) Hansa Rostock	Loan return	Summer	2023	—	—
Can Bozdoğan	(Germany)	MF	(Turkey) Beşiktaş	Loan return	Summer	2024	—	—
Amine Harit	(Morocco)	MF	(France) Marseille	Loan return	Summer	2024	—	—
Ozan Kabak	(Turkey)	DF	(England) Norwich City	Loan return	Summer	2024	—	—
Rabbi Matondo	(Wales)	FW	(Belgium) Cercle Brugge	Loan return	Summer	2023	—	—
Hamza Mendyl	(Morocco)	DF	(Turkey) Gaziantep	Loan return	Summer	2023	—	—

=== Out ===
Player	Nat.	Pos.	To	Type	Window	Transfer fee	Ref.
Florent Mollet	(France)	MF	(France) Nantes	Transfer	Winter	€1,500,000	
Jordan Larsson	(Sweden)	FW	(Denmark) Copenhagen	Loan (option to buy)	Winter	—	
Kerim Çalhanoğlu	(Germany)	MF	(Germany) SV Sandhausen	Loan	Winter	—	
Florian Flick	(Germany)	MF	(Germany) 1. FC Nürnberg	Loan	Winter	—	
Malick Thiaw	(Germany)	DF	(Italy) AC Milan	Transfer	Summer	€10,000,000	
Ozan Kabak	(Turkey)	DF	(Germany) 1899 Hoffenheim	Transfer	Summer	€7,000,000	
Rabbi Matondo	(Wales)	FW	(Scotland) Rangers	Transfer	Summer	€3,000,000	
Victor Pálsson	(Iceland)	MF	(United States) D.C. United	Transfer	Summer	€500,000	
Timo Becker	(Germany)	DF	(Germany) Holstein Kiel	Transfer	Summer	€250,000	
Levent Mercan	(Germany)	MF	(Turkey) Fatih Karagümrük	Transfer (Note: Player was previously loaned to the club.)	Summer	€200,000	
Hamza Mendyl	(Morocco)	DF	(Belgium) OH Leuven	Transfer	Summer	Free	
Marius Lode	(Norway)	DF	(Norway) Bodø/Glimt	Released	Summer	—	
Martin Fraisl	(Austria)	GK	(Germany) Arminia Bielefeld	End of contract	Summer	—	
Marc Rzatkowski	(Germany)	MF	(Germany) Arminia Bielefeld	End of contract	Summer	—	
Salif Sané	(Senegal)	DF	Free agent	End of contract	Summer	—	
Can Bozdoğan	(Germany)	MF	(Netherlands) Utrecht	Loan (option to buy)	Summer	—	
Amine Harit	(Morocco)	MF	(France) Marseille	Loan (option to buy)	Summer	—	
Reinhold Ranftl	(Austria)	MF	Austria Wien	Loan (option to buy)	Summer	—	
Nassim Boujellab	(Morocco)	MF	(Finland) HJK	Loan (Note: Player was previously loaned to Ingolstadt 04 and loaned from there to HJK.)	Summer	—	
Blendi Idrizi	(Kosovo)	MF	(Germany) Jahn Regensburg	Loan	Summer	—	
Marvin Pieringer	(Germany)	FW	(Germany) SC Paderborn	Loan	Summer	—	
Dong-gyeong Lee	(South Korea)	MF	(South Korea) Ulsan Hyundai	End of loan (released)	Summer	—	
Darko Churlinov	(North Macedonia)	MF	(Germany) VfB Stuttgart	End of loan	Summer	—	—
Ko Itakura	(Japan)	DF	(England) Manchester City	End of loan	Summer	—	
Yaroslav Mikhaylov	(Russia)	MF	(Russia) Zenit Saint Petersburg	End of loan	Summer	—	
Andreas Vindheim	(Norway)	DF	(Czech Republic) Sparta Prague	End of loan	Summer	—	

== Friendly matches ==
Win Draw Loss

29 June 2022 1	VfB Hüls	0–14	Schalke 04	Marl, Germany
18:00 CEST (UTC+2)		Report	Terodde 8', 10', 22', 25' (pen.), 27', 43'; Ouwejan 17'; Lee 19', 38'; Kurt 29'; Polter 70', 74'; Castelle 79'; Mollet 82'	Stadium: Evonik Sportpark; Attendance: 3,100; Referee: Bäger

2 July 2022 2	Blau-Weiß Lohne	0–7	Schalke 04	Lohne, Germany
15:30 CEST (UTC+2)		Report	Latza 10', 39'; Polter 15', 27'; Mollet 28'; Terodde 34'; Pieringer 54'	Stadium: Heinz-Dettmer-Stadion; Referee: Marius Schlüwe

6 July 2022 3	Schalke 04	1–0	SC Verl	Gelsenkirchen, Germany
17:30 CEST (UTC+2)	Matriciani 48'	Report		Stadium: Parkstadion; Attendance: 2,500; Referee: Nico Fuchs

9 July 2022 4	Schalke 04	1–3	SV Meppen	Gelsenkirchen, Germany
13:00 CEST (UTC+2)	Latza (yellow card) 4'; Drexler 32'	Report	Pourié 35'; Tankulic 43'; Blacha 57'	Stadium: Parkstadion; Attendance: 2,999; Referee: Florian Exner

13 July 2022 5	Schalke 04	0–0	Salernitana	Wörgl, Austria
18:00 CEST (UTC+2)	Lee (yellow card) 56'	Report	Fazio (yellow card) 54'	Stadium: Sportzentrum Wörgl; Attendance: 1,850; Referee: Andreas Heiß (Austria)

17 July 2022	Schalke 04	cancelled	Udinese	Mittersill, Austria
16:30 CEST (UTC+2)				Stadium: Waldstadion
Note: Schalke's match against Udinese was cancelled and replaced with a match against Augsburg due to security reasons.

17 July 2022 6	Schalke 04	1–1	FC Augsburg	Mittersill, Austria
16:30 CEST (UTC+2)	Polter 78'	Report	Uduokhai 54'	Stadium: Waldstadion; Attendance: 1,500; Referee: Arnes Talic

22 July 2022 7	Twente	3–1	Schalke 04	Enschede, Netherlands
20:00 CEST (UTC+2)	Vlap 13'; Steijn 83'; Ugalde 89'	Report	Kamiński 9'; Latza (yellow card) 45+1'	Stadium: De Grolsch Veste; Attendance: 26,000; Referee: Serdar Gözübüyük (Netherlands)

22 September 2022 8	FC Gütersloh	0–3	Schalke 04	Gütersloh, Germany
19:00 CEST (UTC+2)		Report	Latza 25'; Terodde 76', 84'	Stadium: Heidewaldstadion; Attendance: 2,753; Referee: Michael Swiers

9 December 2022 9	Rapid Wien	2–2	Schalke 04	Vienna, Austria
19:00 CET (UTC+1)	Knasmüllner 49'; Kerschbaum 65' (pen.)	Report	Kōzuki 8'; Terodde 31'	Stadium: Allianz Stadion; Attendance: 9,500; Referee: Gerhard Grobelnik

16 December 2022 10	Hajduk Split	4–3	Schalke 04	Split, Croatia
18:00 CET (UTC+1)	Ćubelić 24'; Sahiti 47'; Biuk 61'; Vušković 71'	Report	Polter 37'; Bülter 44' (pen.); Kōzuki 73'	Stadium: Stadion Poljud; Attendance: 3,000; Referee: Ante Terzic

22 December 2022 11	VfL Osnabrück	2–2	Schalke 04	Osnabrück, Germany
19:00 CET (UTC+1)	Chato 22'; Simakala 47' (pen.)	Report	Kōzuki 16'; Cissé 86'	Stadium: Stadion an der Bremer Brücke; Attendance: 12,524; Referee: Luca Jürgensen

7 January 2023 12	Schalke 04	2–2	FC Zürich	Belek, Turkey
13:30 CET (UTC+1)	Kōzuki 52'; Terodde 57'	Report	Katić 25'; Okita 89' (pen.)	Stadium: Titanic Deluxe Football Center; Attendance: 500; Referee: Kemal Ögen

10 January 2023 13	Schalke 04	0–1	1. FC Nürnberg	Belek, Turkey
13:30 CET (UTC+1)		Report	Shuranov 79' (pen.)	Stadium: Titanic Deluxe Football Center; Attendance: 400; Referee: Sarper Saka

14 January 2023 14	Schalke 04	0–1	Werder Bremen	Gelsenkirchen, Germany
15:30 CET (UTC+1)		Report	Füllkrug 4'	Stadium: Veltins-Arena; Attendance: 18,464; Referee: Florian Exner

24 March 2023 15	Schalke 04	2–0	VVV-Venlo	Gelsenkirchen, Germany
13:00 CET (UTC+1)	Terodde 16'; van der Sloot 22'	Report		Stadium: Parkstadion; Attendance: 1,113; Referee: Alexander Ernst

== Competitions ==
=== Overview ===
Competition	First match	Last match	Starting round	Final position	Record							
Competition	First match	Last match	Starting round	Final position	Pld	W	D	L	GF	GA	GD	Win %
Bundesliga	7 August 2022	27 May 2023	Matchday 1	17th	34	7	10	17	35	71	−36	20.59
DFB-Pokal	31 July 2022	18 October 2022	First round	Second round	2	1	0	1	6	5	+1	50.00
Total					36	8	10	18	41	76	−35	22.22

Source: Soccerway

=== Bundesliga ===
==== League table ====
Pos	Team	Pld	W	D	L	GF	GA	GD	Pts	Qualification or relegation
14	VfL Bochum	34	10	5	19	40	72	−32	35	
15	FC Augsburg	34	9	7	18	42	63	−21	34	
16	VfB Stuttgart (O)	34	7	12	15	45	57	−12	33	Qualification for the relegation play-offs
17	Schalke 04 (R)	34	7	10	17	35	71	−36	31	Relegation to 2. Bundesliga
18	Hertha BSC (R)	34	7	8	19	42	69	−27	29	Relegation to 2. Bundesliga

Source: DFB
Rules for classification: 1) Points; 2) Goal difference; 3) Goals scored; 4) Head-to-head results; 5) Head-to-head away goals scored; 6) Away goals scored; 7) Play-off.
(O) Play-off winners; (R) Relegated

==== Results summary ====
Overall								Home						Away					
Pld	W	D	L	GF	GA	GD	Pts	W	D	L	GF	GA	GD	W	D	L	GF	GA	GD
34	7	10	17	35	71	−36	31	5	5	7	23	36	−13	2	5	10	12	35	−23

Source: Bundesliga

==== Results by round ====
Round	1	2	3	4	5	6	7	8	9	10	11	12	13	14	15	16	17	18	19	20	21	22	23	24	25	26	27	28	29	30	31	32	33	34
Ground	A	H	A	H	A	H	A	H	A	H	A	H	A	H	H	A	H	H	A	H	A	H	A	H	A	H	A	H	A	H	A	A	H	A
Result	L	D	D	L	D	W	L	L	L	L	L	L	L	W	L	L	L	D	D	D	D	W	W	D	D	L	L	W	L	W	W	L	D	L
Position	14	13	13	16	15	12	14	15	16	17	18	18	18	18	18	18	18	18	18	18	18	18	17	17	17	17	18	17	17	17	15	16	17	17

Source: DFB
A = Away; H = Home; W = Win; D = Draw; L = Loss

==== Matches ====
7 August 2022 1	1. FC Köln	3–1	Schalke 04	Cologne
17:30 c (UTC+2)	Kilian 49'; Kainz 62'; Ljubičić 80'	Report	Drexler (red card) 35'; Brunner (yellow card) 51'; Bülter 76'	Stadium: RheinEnergieStadion; Attendance: 50,000; Referee: Robert Schröder

13 August 2022 2	Schalke 04	2–2	Borussia Mönchengladbach	Gelsenkirchen
18:30 CEST (UTC+2)	Zalazar 29'; Krauß (yellow card) 35'; Ouwejan (yellow card) 41'; Zalazar (yellow card) 45'; Král (yellow card) 57'; Bülter 90+3' (pen.)	Report	Koné (yellow card) 45+1'; Hofmann 72'; Thuram 78'; Herrmann (yellow card) 90+2'	Stadium: Veltins-Arena; Attendance: 62,271; Referee: Sven Jablonski

20 August 2022 3	VfL Wolfsburg	0–0	Schalke 04	Wolfsburg
15:30 CEST (UTC+2)	Bornauw (yellow card) 26'	Report	Latza (yellow card) 4'; Thiaw (yellow card) 25'; Terodde (penalty missed) 45+3'; Bülter (yellow card) 65'	Stadium: Volkswagen Arena; Attendance: 26,959; Referee: Felix Zwayer

27 August 2022 4	Schalke 04	1–6	Union Berlin	Gelsenkirchen
15:30 CEST (UTC+2)	Bülter 31' (pen.); Thiaw (yellow card) 45'	Report	Thorsby 6'; Becker 36', 46'; Haberer 45+3'; Michel 87', 90'	Stadium: Veltins-Arena; Attendance: 62,271; Referee: Robert Hartmann

3 September 2022 5	VfB Stuttgart	1–1	Schalke 04	Stuttgart
15:30 CEST (UTC+2)	Führich 18'; Sosa (yellow card) 45+4'; Vagnoman (yellow card) 45' (yellow-red card) 67'; Mavropanos (yellow card) 73'	Report	Terodde 21'; Drexler (yellow card) 28'; Bülter (yellow card) 45'	Stadium: Mercedes-Benz Arena; Attendance: 47,500; Referee: Florian Badstübner

10 September 2022 6	Schalke 04	3–1	VfL Bochum	Gelsenkirchen
18:30 CEST (UTC+2)	Drexler 38'; Mašović 73' (o.g.); Schwolow (yellow card) 85'; Flick (yellow card) 86'; Polter 90+6'	Report	Zoller (yellow card) 9'; Losilla (yellow card) 29'; Hofmann 51'; Soares (yellow card) 82'	Stadium: Veltins-Arena; Attendance: 62,041; Referee: Felix Zwayer

17 September 2022 7	Borussia Dortmund	1–0	Schalke 04	Dortmund
15:30 CEST (UTC+2)	Modeste (yellow card) 45'; Moukoko 79'; Adeyemi (yellow card) 83'; Can (yellow card) 85'	Report	Van den Berg (yellow card) 20'; Terodde (yellow card) 39'	Stadium: Signal Iduna Park; Attendance: 81,100; Referee: Felix Brych

2 October 2022 8	Schalke 04	2–3	FC Augsburg	Gelsenkirchen
17:30 CEST (UTC+2)	Terodde 33', (yellow card) 34'; Bülter (yellow card) 34'; Krauß 63'	Report	Demirović 9', 21', (yellow card) 73'; Bauer (yellow card) 30'; Berisha (yellow card) 34' (yellow-red card) 70'; Niederlechner (yellow card) 68'; Gumny (yellow card) 74'; Hahn 77'	Stadium: Veltins-Arena; Attendance: 60,328; Referee: Daniel Schlager

8 October 2022 9	Bayer Leverkusen	4–0	Schalke 04	Leverkusen
15:30 CEST (UTC+2)	Diaby 38'; Frimpong 41', 52'; Hincapié (yellow card) 55'; Paulinho 90'	Report	Yoshida (yellow card) 13'	Stadium: BayArena; Attendance: 30,210; Referee: Tobias Reichel

14 October 2022 10	Schalke 04	0–3	1899 Hoffenheim	Gelsenkirchen
20:30 CEST (UTC+2)	Greiml (yellow card) 10'; Drexler (yellow card) 57'	Report	Skov 11' (pen.), 59' (pen.); Vogt (yellow card) 19'; Prömel (yellow card) 38'; Dabbur 45+2'	Stadium: Veltins-Arena; Attendance: 59,811; Referee: Florian Badstubner

23 October 2022 11	Hertha BSC	2–1	Schalke 04	Berlin
17:30 CEST (UTC+2)	Tousart 49'; Kanga (yellow card) 75', (goal) 88'; Rogel (yellow card) 81'; Lukebakio (yellow card) 90+1'; Richter (yellow card) 90+3'; Boetius (yellow card) 90+6'	Report	Mollet 85'; Polter (yellow card) 86'	Stadium: Olympiastadion; Attendance: 60,165; Referee: Martin Petersen

30 October 2022 12	Schalke 04	0–2	SC Freiburg	Gelsenkirchen
17:30 CEST (UTC+2)	Polter (yellow card) 18'; Krauß (yellow card) 73'; Yoshida (yellow card) 90'	Report	Ginter (yellow card) 41'; Grifo 45+1', 61' (pen.); Günter (yellow card) 88'	Stadium: Veltins-Arena; Attendance: 61,115; Referee: Christian Dingert

5 November 2022 13	Werder Bremen	2–1	Schalke 04	Bremen
18:30 CET (UTC+1)	Füllkrug 30'; Veljković (yellow card) 56'; Bittencourt (yellow card) 69'; Ducksch 76'; Pieper (yellow card) 82'	Report	Terodde (yellow card) 43'; Karaman (yellow card) 82'; Drexler 89'	Stadium: Weser-Stadion; Attendance: 42,100; Referee: Felix Brych

9 November 2022 14	Schalke 04	1–0	Mainz 05	Gelsenkirchen
20:30 CET (UTC+1)	Terodde 10'; Mollet (yellow card) 21'; Yoshida (yellow card) 57'; Karaman (yellow card) 69'	Report	Fernandes (yellow card) 67'	Stadium: Veltins-Arena; Attendance: 58,256; Referee: Tobias Reichel

12 November 2022 15	Schalke 04	0–2	Bayern Munich	Gelsenkirchen
18:30 CET (UTC+1)		Report	Gnabry 38'; Choupo-Moting 52'	Stadium: Veltins-Arena; Attendance: 62,271; Referee: Felix Zwayer

21 January 2023 16	Eintracht Frankfurt	3–0	Schalke 04	Frankfurt
15:30 CET (UTC+1)	Lindstrøm 21'; Borré (yellow card) 78', (goal) 84'; Götze (yellow card) 88'; Buta 90+1'	Report	Bülter (yellow card) 58'; Krauß (yellow card) 67'; Uronen (yellow card) 86'	Stadium: Deutsche Bank Park; Attendance: 50,000; Referee: Marco Fritz

24 January 2023 17	Schalke 04	1–6	RB Leipzig	Gelsenkirchen
18:30 CET (UTC+1)	Kōzuki 56'; Frey (yellow card) 79'	Report	Silva 7', 44'; Henrichs 15'; Werner 45+2'; Olmo 83'; Poulsen 89'; Kampl (yellow card) 90+3'	Stadium: Veltins-Arena; Attendance: 56,841; Referee: Benjamin Cortus

29 January 2023 18	Schalke 04	0–0	1. FC Köln	Gelsenkirchen
15:30 CET (UTC+1)	Brunner (yellow card) 35'; Terodde (yellow card) 39'; Zalazar (yellow card) 81'	Report	Schmitz (yellow card) 76'; Hübers (yellow card) 81'; Skhiri (yellow card) 86'; Kainz (yellow card) 90+3'	Stadium: Veltins-Arena; Attendance: 61,571; Referee: Matthias Jöllenbeck

4 February 2023 19	Borussia Mönchengladbach	0–0	Schalke 04	Mönchengladbach
18:30 CET (UTC+1)	Weigl (yellow card) 34'; Hofmann (yellow card) 76'	Report	Balanta (yellow card) 6'; Jenz (yellow card) 14'; Kozuki (yellow card) 65'	Stadium: Borussia-Park; Attendance: 54,042; Referee: Deniz Aytekin

10 February 2023 20	Schalke 04	0–0	VfL Wolfsburg	Gelsenkirchen
20:30 CET (UTC+1)	Zalazar (yellow card) 48'	Report	Arnold (penalty missed) 9'; Wimmer (yellow card) 29'; Gerhardt (yellow card) 48'; Svanberg (yellow card) 90+2'; Guilavogui (yellow card) 90+3'	Stadium: Veltins-Arena; Attendance: 60,836; Referee: Benjamin Brand

19 February 2023 21	Union Berlin	0–0	Schalke 04	Berlin
15:30 CET (UTC+1)	Behrens (yellow card) 32'; Gießelmann (yellow card) 55'	Report	Jenz (yellow card) 22'	Stadium: Stadion An der Alten Försterei; Attendance: 22,012; Referee: Tobias Reichel

25 February 2023 22	Schalke 04	2–1	VfB Stuttgart	Gelsenkirchen
18:30 CET (UTC+1)	Drexler 10'; Bülter 40'; Král (yellow card) 42'; Greiml (yellow card) 90+6'	Report	Sosa 63', (yellow card) 70'; Karazor (yellow card) 90+1'	Stadium: Veltins-Arena; Attendance: 62,271; Referee: Deniz Aytekin

4 March 2023 23	VfL Bochum	0–2	Schalke 04	Bochum
15:30 CET (UTC+1)	Osterhage (yellow card) 59'; Förster (yellow card) 85'	Report	Krauß (yellow card) 31'; Riemann 45' (o.g.); Bülter 79'	Stadium: Vonovia Ruhrstadion; Attendance: 26,000; Referee: Felix Brych

11 March 2023 24	Schalke 04	2–2	Borussia Dortmund	Gelsenkirchen
18:30 CET (UTC+1)	Bülter 50'; Brunner (yellow card) 55'; Karaman 79'	Report	Schlotterbeck 38'; Guerreiro 60'; Can (yellow card) 90'	Stadium: Veltins-Arena; Attendance: 61,571; Referee: Marco Fritz

18 March 2023 25	FC Augsburg	1–1	Schalke 04	Augsburg
15:30 CET (UTC+1)	Maier 51'; Demirović (red card) 53'; Vargas (yellow card) 62'; Gikiewicz (yellow card) 78'; Cardona (yellow card) 90+2'; Gouweleeuw (yellow card) 90+2'	Report	Balanta (yellow card) 5'; Král (yellow card) 12'; Jenz (yellow card) 63'; Frey (yellow card) 90+3'; Bülter 90+3' (pen.)	Stadium: WWK Arena; Attendance: 30,660; Referee: Daniel Schlager

1 April 2023 26	Schalke 04	0–3	Bayer Leverkusen	Gelsenkirchen
15:30 CEST (UTC+2)	Matriciani (yellow card) 51'; Balanta (yellow card) 56'	Report	Palacios (yellow card) 39'; Frimpong 50'; Wirtz 61'; Azmoun 90+2'	Stadium: Veltins-Arena; Attendance: 62,271; Referee: Deniz Aytekin

9 April 2023 27	1899 Hoffenheim	2–0	Schalke 04	Sinsheim
19:30 CEST (UTC+2)	Baumgartner (yellow card) 16'; Král 22' (o.g.); Geiger (yellow card) 40'; Bebou 70' (pen.); Kabak (yellow card) 90+4'	Report		Stadium: Rhein-Neckar-Arena; Attendance: 30,150; Referee: Matthias Jöllenbeck

14 April 2023 28	Schalke 04	5–2	Hertha BSC	Gelsenkirchen
20:30 CEST (UTC+2)	Skarke 3'; Bülter 13', 78'; Terodde 48'; Krauß (yellow card) 86'; Jenz (yellow card) 87'; Kamiński 90+2'	Report	Boateng (yellow card) 40'; Jovetić 45+3'; Ngankam (yellow card) 70'; Richter 84'; Uremović (yellow card) 90'	Stadium: Veltins-Arena; Attendance: 61,981; Referee: Felix Brych

23 April 2023 29	SC Freiburg	4–0	Schalke 04	Freiburg
15:30 CEST (UTC+2)	Gregoritsch 7', 35'; Höler 52'; Ginter 82'; Keitel (yellow card) 87'	Report	Uronen (yellow card) 45+2'; Latza (yellow card) 90+4'	Stadium: Europa-Park Stadion; Attendance: 34,700; Referee: Robert Hartmann

29 April 2023 30	Schalke 04	2–1	Werder Bremen	Gelsenkirchen
18:30 CEST (UTC+2)	Krauß (yellow card) 65'; Yoshida (yellow card) 75'; Van den Berg 81', (yellow card) 85'; Drexler 90+2'	Report	Ducksch 18', (yellow card) 68'; Stage (yellow card) 28'; Veljković (yellow card) 57'	Stadium: Veltins-Arena; Attendance: 61,981; Referee: Bastian Dankert

5 May 2023 31	Mainz 05	2–3	Schalke 04	Mainz
20:30 CEST (UTC+2)	Ajorque (yellow card) 40'; Barreiro 53', (yellow card) 90+14'; Martín 70'; Caci (yellow card) 90+11'; Kohr; (yellow card) 90+14'	Report	Bülter 26', 90+12' (pen.); Krauß 60'; Drexler (yellow card) 90+14'	Stadium: Mewa Arena; Attendance: 33,305; Referee: Matthias Jöllenbeck

13 May 2023 32	Bayern Munich	6–0	Schalke 04	Munich
15:30 CEST (UTC+2)	Müller 21'; Kimmich 29' (pen.); Gnabry 50', 65'; Tel 80'; Mazraoui 90+2'	Report	Krauß (yellow card) 20'; Brunner (yellow card) 28'; Bülter (yellow card) 36'	Stadium: Allianz Arena; Attendance: 75,000; Referee: Robert Schröder

20 May 2023 33	Schalke 04	2–2	Eintracht Frankfurt	Gelsenkirchen
15:30 CEST (UTC+2)	Terodde 1', (yellow card) 40'; Krauß (yellow card) 39'; Jenz (yellow card) 44'; Polter 85'	Report	Sow (yellow card) 6'; Kamada 21'; Buta (yellow card) 32'; Kolo Muani (yellow card) 44'; Tuta 59', (yellow card) 90+4'	Stadium: Veltins-Arena; Attendance: 61,575; Referee: Daniel Schlager

27 May 2023 34	RB Leipzig	4–2	Schalke 04	Leipzig
15:30 CEST (UTC+2)	Laimer 10'; Nkunku 19', 90+4', (yellow card) 90+5'; Haidara (yellow card) 41'; Poulsen 82'	Report	Brunner (yellow card) 20'; Kamiński 28'; Orbán 49' (o.g.); Polter (yellow card) 63'	Stadium: Red Bull Arena; Attendance: 47,069; Referee: Harm Osmers

=== DFB-Pokal ===
31 July 2022 1st round	Bremer SV	0–5	Schalke 04	Oldenburg
13:01 CEST (UTC+2)		Report	Zalazar 3'; Drexler 12', 33'; Kmiec 39' (o.g.); Kamiński 83'	Stadium: Marschweg-Stadion; Attendance: 10,000; Referee: Patrick Hanslbauer
Note: The match took place at the Marschweg-Stadion instead of Bremer SV's home stadium, the Stadion am Panzenberg in Bremen.

18 October 2022 2nd round	1899 Hoffenheim	5–1	Schalke 04	Sinsheim
20:45 CEST (UTC+2)	Dabbur 5', 43'; Angeliño 16'; Kabak 51'; Kadeřábek 63'	Report	Matriciani (yellow card) 42'; Drexler 69'; Larsson (yellow card) 73'; Flick (yellow card) 78'	Stadium: Rhein-Neckar-Arena; Attendance: 15,633; Referee: Matthias Jöllenbeck

== Statistics ==
As of end of 2022–23 season

=== Squad statistics ===
No.	Player	Nat	Pos	Total					Bundesliga					DFB-Pokal				
No.	Player	Nat	Pos	App	St	Goal	Yellow card	Red card	App	St	Goal	Yellow card	Red card	App	St	Goal	Yellow card	Red card
1	Ralf Fährmann	(Germany)	GK	12	12	0	0	0	12	12	0	0	0	0	0	0	0	0
13	Alexander Schwolow	(Germany)	GK	25	24	0	1	0	23	22	0	1	0	2	2	0	0	0
28	Justin Heekeren	(Germany)	GK	0	0	0	0	0	0	0	0	0	0	0	0	0	0	0
2	Thomas Ouwejan	(Netherlands)	DF	19	12	0	1	0	17	10	0	1	0	2	2	0	0	0
3	Leo Greiml	(Austria)	DF	7	3	0	2	0	7	3	0	2	0	0	0	0	0	0
4	Maya Yoshida	(Japan)	DF	31	30	0	4	0	29	28	0	4	0	2	2	0	0	0
5	Sepp van den Berg	(Netherlands)	DF	9	8	1	2	0	9	8	1	2	0	0	0	0	0	0
15	Timothée Kolodziejczak	(France)	DF	1	0	0	0	0	1	0	0	0	0	0	0	0	0	0
18	Jere Uronen	(Finland)	DF	11	9	0	2	0	11	9	0	2	0	0	0	0	0	0
22	Ibrahima Cissé	(Mali)	DF	0	0	0	0	0	0	0	0	0	0	0	0	0	0	0
25	Moritz Jenz	(Germany)	DF	11	11	0	5	0	11	11	0	5	0	0	0	0	0	0
27	Cédric Brunner	(Switzerland)	DF	29	29	0	5	0	28	28	0	5	0	1	1	0	0	0
35	Marcin Kamiński	(Poland)	DF	9	8	3	0	0	8	7	2	0	0	1	1	1	0	0
41	Henning Matriciani	(Germany)	DF	23	23	0	2	0	22	22	0	1	0	1	1	0	1	0
~~33~~	Malick Thiaw (Note: Player transferred out during the season)	(Germany)	DF	3	3	0	2	0	3	3	0	2	0	0	0	0	0	0
6	Tom Krauß	(Germany)	MF	33	32	2	8	0	32	31	2	8	0	1	1	0	0	0
8	Danny Latza	(Germany)	MF	21	9	0	2	0	20	8	0	2	0	1	1	0	0	0
10	Rodrigo Zalazar	(Uruguay)	MF	23	16	2	3	0	22	15	1	3	0	1	1	1	0	0
21	Niklas Tauer	(Germany)	MF	0	0	0	0	0	0	0	0	0	0	0	0	0	0	0
23	Mehmet-Can Aydın	(Turkey)	MF	18	3	0	0	0	16	3	0	0	0	2	0	0	0	0
24	Dominick Drexler	(Germany)	MF	29	17	7	3	1	27	16	4	3	1	2	1	3	0	0
29	Tobias Mohr	(Germany)	MF	20	10	0	0	0	18	8	0	0	0	2	2	0	0	0
30	Alex Král	(Czech Republic)	MF	31	28	0	3	0	29	26	0	3	0	2	2	0	0	0
33	Éder Balanta	(Colombia)	MF	6	3	0	3	0	6	3	0	3	0	0	0	0	0	0
37	Andreas Ivan (Note: Player from Schalke 04 II)	(Romania)	MF	1	0	0	0	0	1	0	0	0	0	0	0	0	0	0
~~17~~	Florian Flick	(Germany)	MF	10	6	0	2	0	8	5	0	1	0	2	1	0	1	0
~~20~~	Florent Mollet	(France)	MF	11	5	1	1	0	9	4	1	1	0	2	1	0	0	0
~~42~~	Kerim Çalhanoğlu	(Germany)	MF	3	0	0	0	0	3	0	0	0	0	0	0	0	0	0
9	Simon Terodde	(Germany)	FW	33	22	5	5	0	32	21	5	5	0	1	1	0	0	0
11	Marius Bülter	(Germany)	FW	35	30	11	5	0	33	30	11	5	0	2	0	0	0	0
19	Kenan Karaman	(Turkey)	FW	22	10	1	2	0	21	10	1	2	0	1	0	0	0	0
20	Tim Skarke	(Germany)	FW	9	6	1	0	0	9	6	1	0	0	0	0	0	0	0
26	Michael Frey	(Switzerland)	FW	15	10	0	2	0	15	10	0	2	0	0	0	0	0	0
38	Sōichirō Kōzuki	(Japan)	FW	5	5	1	1	0	5	5	1	1	0	0	0	0	0	0
40	Sebastian Polter	(Germany)	FW	21	6	2	3	0	19	5	2	3	0	2	1	0	0	0
42	Keke Topp (Note: Player from Schalke 04 U19)	(Germany)	FW	1	0	0	0	0	1	0	0	0	0	0	0	0	0	0
44	Sidi Sané	(Germany)	FW	2	0	0	0	0	1	0	0	0	0	1	0	0	0	0
~~7~~	Jordan Larsson	(Sweden)	FW	12	6	0	1	0	11	5	0	0	0	1	1	0	1	0
Total				36		37	70	1	34		32	67	1	2		5	3	0

=== Goalscorers ===
Rank	Player	Nat	Pos	Bundesliga	DFB-Pokal	Total
1	Marius Bülter	(Germany)	FW	11	0	11
2	Dominick Drexler	(Germany)	MF	4	3	7
3	Simon Terodde	(Germany)	FW	5	0	5
4	Marcin Kamiński	(Poland)	DF	2	1	3
5	Tom Krauß	(Germany)	MF	2	0	2
5	Sebastian Polter	(Germany)	FW	2	0	2
5	Rodrigo Zalazar	(Uruguay)	MF	1	1	2
8	Kenan Karaman	(Turkey)	FW	1	0	1
8	Sōichirō Kōzuki	(Japan)	FW	1	0	1
8	Florent Mollet	(France)	MF	1	0	1
8	Tim Skarke	(Germany)	FW	1	0	1
8	Sepp van den Berg	(Netherlands)	DF	1	0	1
Own goals				3	1	3
Total				35	6	41

=== Clean sheets ===
Rank	Player	Nat	Bundesliga	DFB-Pokal	Total
1	Ralf Fährmann	(Germany)	5	0	5
2	Alexander Schwolow	(Germany)	2	1	3
