= Zünd =

Zünd, also spelled Zuend, is a Swiss surname. Notable people with this surname include:

- Andreas Zünd (born 1957), Swiss jurist
- Robert Zünd (1827–1909), Swiss landscape painter
- Stephan Zünd (born 1969), Swiss ski jumper
- Werner Zünd (born 1948), Swiss football manager

== See also ==
- Studio Zünd: 40 Ans d'Evolution, a box set by French rock band Magma
