= Hoeneß =

Hoeneß (or Hoeness) is a German surname. Notable people with the surname include:

- Uli Hoeneß (born 1952), German footballer
- Dieter Hoeneß (born 1953), German footballer, brother of Uli
- Sebastian Hoeneß (born 1982)
