= André Breitenreiter =

German footballer and manager

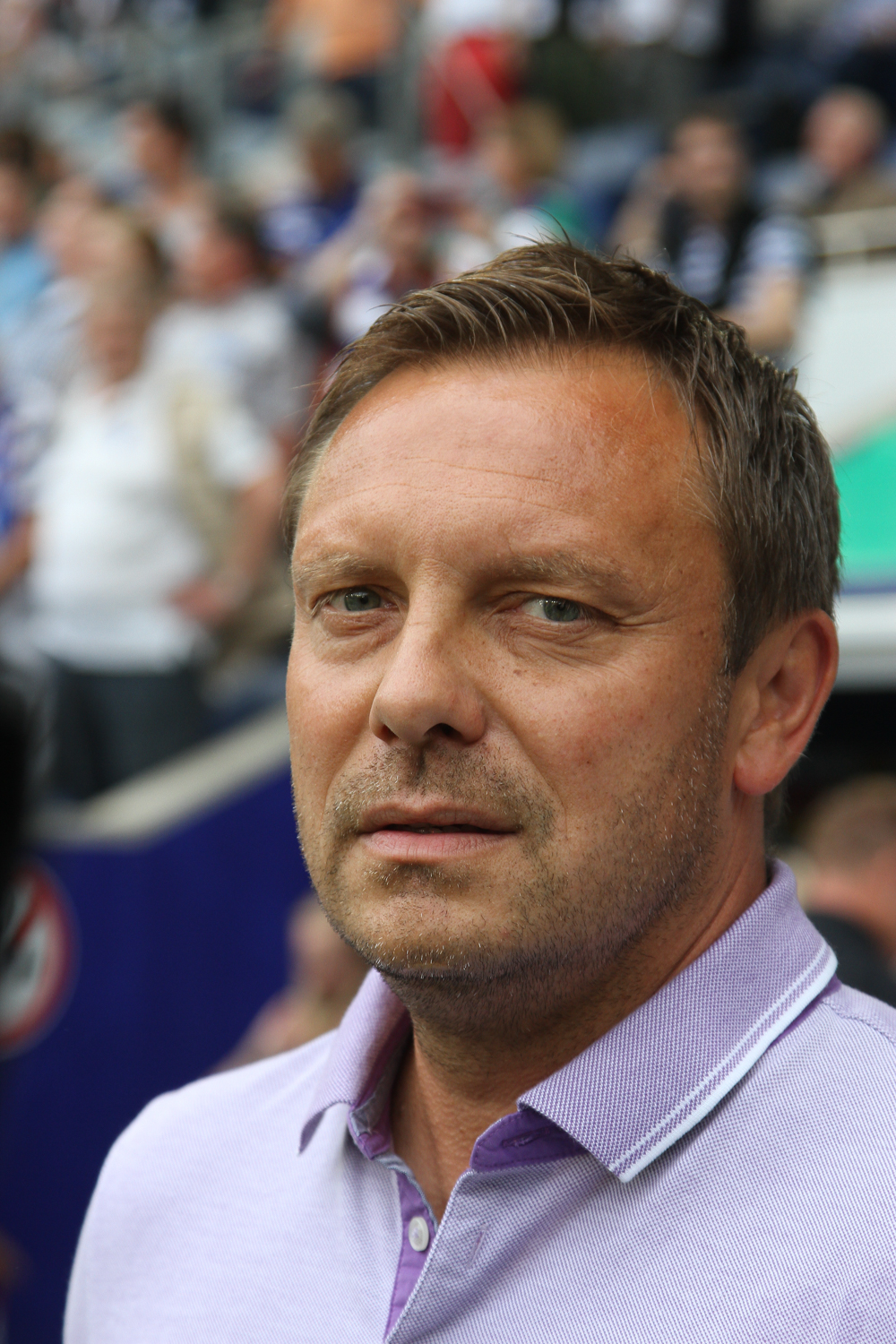
- Breitenreiter as Schalke 04 manager in 2015

Personal information
- Date of birth: 2 October 1973 (age 53)
- Place of birth: Langenhagen, West Germany
- Height: 1.82 m (6 ft 0 in)
- Positions: Attacking midfielder; striker

Team information
- Current team: Hansa Rostock (manager)

Youth career
- 1977–1984: Borussia Hannover
- 1984–1986: Hannoverscher SC
- 1986–1991: Hannover 96

Senior career*
Years	Team	Apps	(Gls)
1991–1994	Hannover 96	72	(10)
1994–1997	Hamburger SV	71	(12)
1998–1999	VfL Wolfsburg	24	(1)
1999–2002	SpVgg Unterhaching	78	(18)
2002	SC Langenhagen	14	(3)
2002–2003	Hessen Kassel	13	(8)
2003–2007	Holstein Kiel	116	(15)
2007–2009	BV Cloppenburg	60	(9)
2009–2010	TSV Havelse	21	(6)
Total		469	(82)

International career
	Germany U16	12	(8)
	Germany U18	14	(4)
	Germany U20	5	(3)
1995–1996	Germany U21	6	(2)

Managerial career
- 2011–2013: TSV Havelse
- 2013–2015: SC Paderborn
- 2015–2016: Schalke 04
- 2017–2019: Hannover 96
- 2021–2022: Zürich
- 2022–2023: TSG Hoffenheim
- 2024: Huddersfield Town
- 2024–2025: Hannover 96
- 2026–: Hansa Rostock
- * Club domestic league appearances and goals

André Breitenreiter (born 2 October 1973) is a German professional manager of Hansa Rostock and former player. Breitenreiter's entire playing career was in his native Germany, appearing in both the Bundesliga and 2. Bundesliga for nine different sides.

As a manager, Breiitenreiter led SC Paderborn to promotion to the Bundesliga for the first time in history, as well as leading Schalke 04, Hannover 96 and TSG Hoffenheim in the top flight. He won the Swiss Super League for FC Zürich in 2021–22 and briefly led EFL Championship club Huddersfield Town in 2024.

== Playing career ==
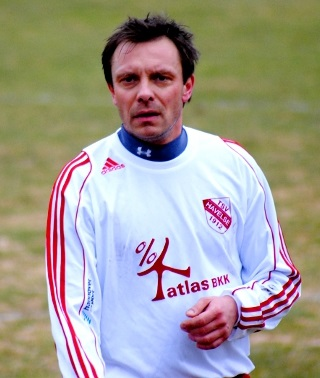
Breitenreiter with TSV Havelse in 2009

Breitenreiter played for Hannoverscher SC, Borussia Hannover, Hannover 96, Hamburger SV, VfL Wolfsburg, SpVgg Unterhaching, SC Langenhagen, Hessen Kassel, Holstein Kiel, BV Cloppenburg and TSV Havelse. He played 144 Bundesliga matches scoring 28 goals and 101 2. Bundesliga matches with 14 goals.

== Managerial career ==
=== Early years and SC Paderborn ===
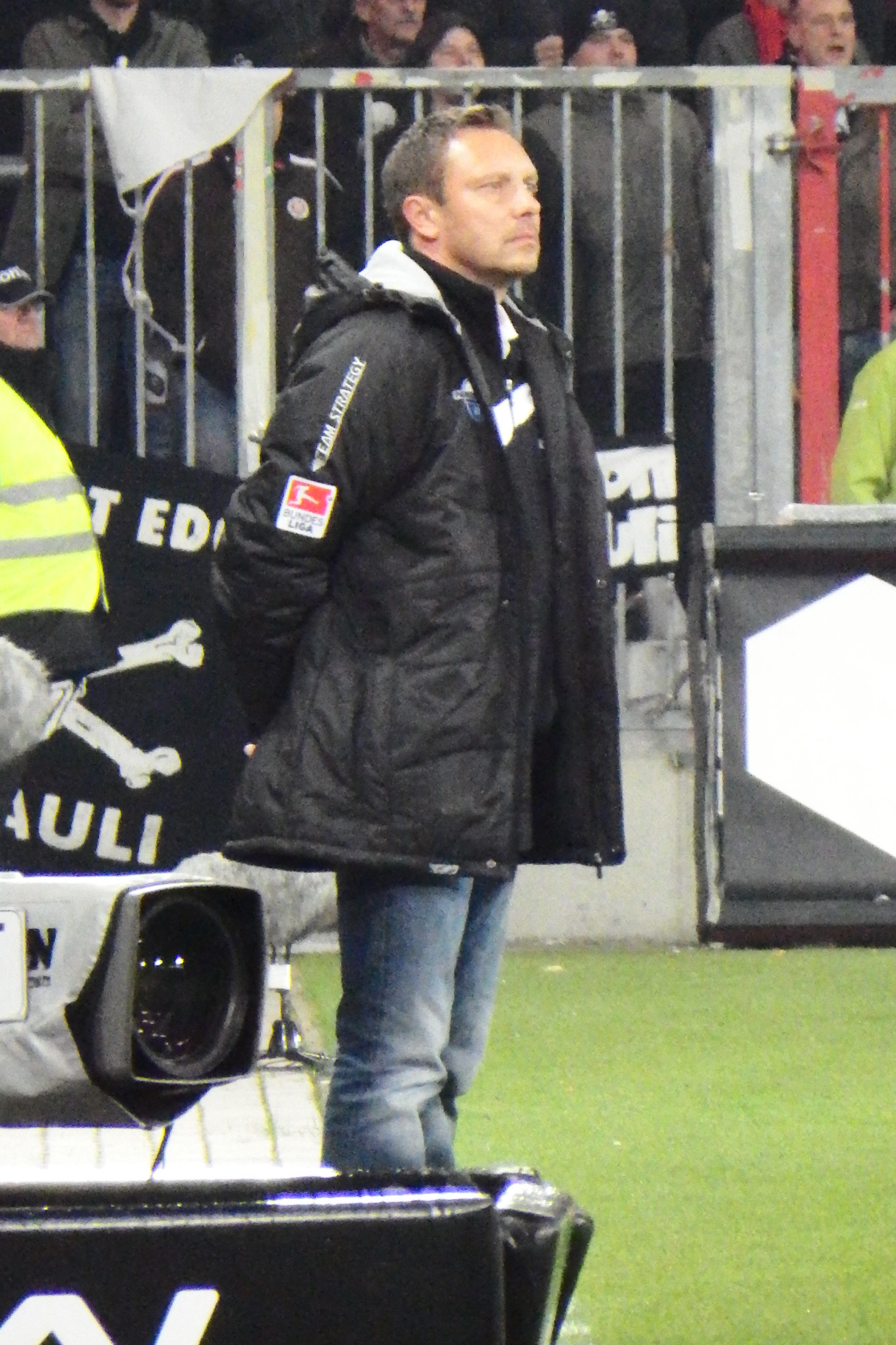
Breitenreiter coaching SC Paderborn in 2013

Breitenreiter started his coaching career in 2009 and worked as scout for Kaiserslautern. On 3 January 2011, he was appointed as head coach of TSV Havelse, club playing in Regionalliga Nord. In 2012, he won Lower Saxony Cup with TSV Havelse. On 15 May 2013, it was announced that Breitenreiter would take over SC Paderborn starting in the 2013–14 season. On 11 May 2014, his club gained promotion to Bundesliga for the first time ever in club's history. On 20 September 2014, after four undefeated games (two wins, two draws) in the German top tier, Paderborn was top of the league, ahead of European powerhouses Bayern Munich, Borussia Dortmund and Bayer Leverkusen.

=== Schalke 04 ===
Breitenreiter became the 14th head coach for Schalke 04 in the last decade on 12 June 2015, signing a two-year deal with €500,000 being paid to Paderborn for his services. His debut on 8 August was a 5–0 win away to MSV Duisburg in the first round of the DFB-Pokal, followed a week later by a 3–0 win at SV Werder Bremen in his first league game. His first campaign as a manager in European football ended in the last 32 of the UEFA Europa League with a 3–0 loss to Shakhtar Donetsk. He left the club after a single season, having come fifth and qualified for the Europa League again, but falling short of club aims of reaching the UEFA Champions League.

=== Hannover 96 ===
Breitenreiter was appointed as the new head coach for Hannover 96 on 20 March 2017, replacing Daniel Stendel during a time of internal changes at the fourth-placed club. On 1 April, he debuted in a 2–0 home win over 1. FC Union Berlin, ending a nine-game unbeaten run for the league leaders. He finished his nine-game run to the end of the season unbeaten, winning promotion as runners-up to VfB Stuttgart. He was sacked on 27 January 2019 after eight consecutive losses put the team second from bottom; his last result was a 5–1 loss at Dortmund, and he was replaced by Thomas Doll.

=== FC Zürich ===
Breitenreiter took the first foreign job of his lifetime in the summer of 2021, taking over an FC Zürich side that had avoided relegation from the Swiss Super League on the penultimate matchday of the previous season. His team won the 2021–22 season by 14 points over FC Basel, playing a quick counter-attacking game; only two teams averaged less possession in the entire league.

=== TSG Hoffenheim ===
In May 2022, Breitenreiter signed for TSG Hoffenheim, succeeding Sebastian Hoeneß on a two-year deal. He was sacked the following 6 February 2023, with the club three points above the relegation zone.

=== Huddersfield Town ===
On 15 February 2024, Breitenreiter was appointed head coach of English Championship club Huddersfield Town on a two-and-a-half-year contract. The team were in 20th, five points above the relegation zone. Nine days later, his team came from behind to win 2–1 at Watford on his debut.

On 10 May 2024, Breitenreiter left Huddersfield Town by mutual consent following the club's relegation to EFL League One; he had won only two of his 13 games. Before his final game, he told BBC Radio Leeds that he would not have joined the club if he had been aware of "things and problems", alleging that they had spent pre-season playing golf and going to the pub.

=== Return to Hannover 96 ===
On 29 December 2024, Breitenreiter returned to Hannover 96, succeeding Stefan Leitl. He received a contract until the end of the season. On 23 April 2025, four matchdays before the end of the season, Breitenreiter and Hannover agreed to part ways early.

=== Hansa Rostock ===
In September 2026, he was named head coach of FC Hansa Rostock.

== Coaching record ==
As of 23 April 2025

Team	From	To	Record					
Team	From	To	M	W	D	L	Win %	Ref.
Havelse	3 January 2011	30 June 2013	86	41	20	25	47.67	
SC Paderborn	1 July 2013	12 June 2015	71	26	18	27	36.62	
Schalke 04	12 June 2015	14 May 2016	44	20	10	14	45.45	
Hannover 96	20 March 2017	27 January 2019	66	20	17	29	30.30	
FC Zürich	9 June 2021	30 June 2022	39	25	8	6	64.10	
TSG Hoffenheim	1 July 2022	6 February 2023	22	7	4	11	31.82	
Huddersfield Town	15 February 2024	10 May 2024	13	2	5	6	15.38	
Hannover 96	29 December 2024	23 April 2025	13	3	7	3	23.08	
Total			354	144	89	121	40.68	—

== Honours ==
=== Player ===
Hannover 96

- DFB-Pokal: 1991–92

=== Manager ===
TSV Havelse

- Lower Saxony Cup: 2012

SC Paderborn

- 2. Bundesliga runner-up: 2013–14

Zürich

- Swiss Super League: 2021–22
