= Ibrahima Cissé (footballer, born 2001) =

Malian footballer (born 2001)

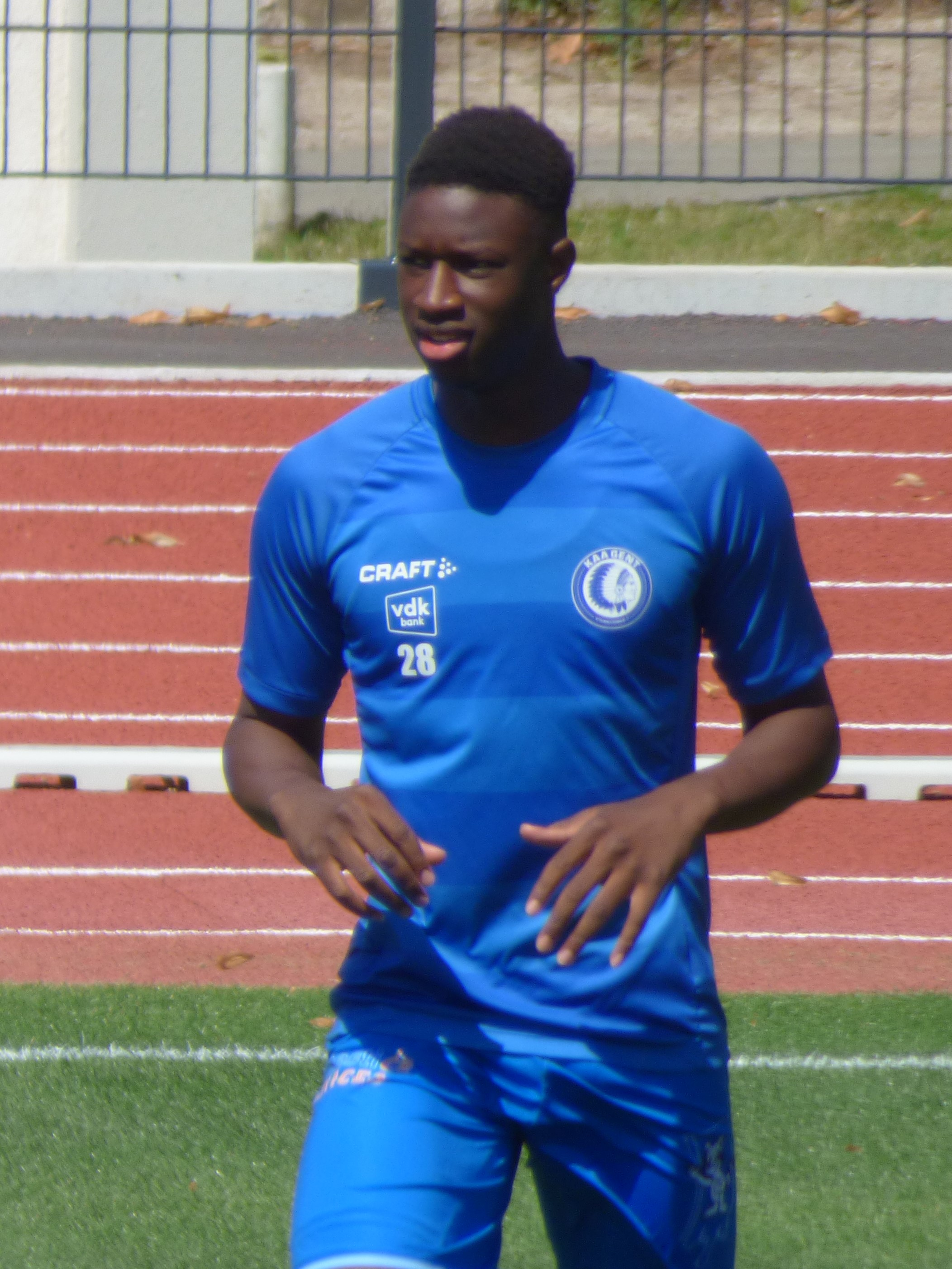
- Cissé in 2020

Personal information
- Date of birth: 15 February 2001 (age 25)
- Place of birth: Dreux, France
- Height: 1.96 m (6 ft 5 in)
- Position: Centre-back

Youth career
- 2007–2017: Drouais
- 2017–2019: Châteauroux
- 2019–2021: Gent

Senior career*
Years	Team	Apps	(Gls)
2021–2022	Gent	2	(0)
2022–2025	Schalke 04	8	(1)
2022–2024	Schalke 04 II	24	(5)
2026	Aarau	0	(0)

International career^{‡}
2020	Mali U20	2	(0)
2023–2024	Mali U23	11	(0)
2024–	Mali	3	(0)
- * Club domestic league appearances and goals as of 6 July 2026 ‡ National team caps and goals as of 31 March 2026

Ibrahima Cissé (born 15 February 2001) is a professional footballer who plays as a centre-back. Born in France, he represents Mali at international level.

== Early life ==
Cissé was born in Dreux, Eure-et-Loir, France, in a family with Malian origins, with two of his elder brothers – Salif and Kalifa – who also embraced a professional footballing career.

== Club career ==
=== Early career ===
Cissé came through the youth ranks of Châteauroux in his native region, before moving to Gent in 2019.

=== Gent ===
Cissé made his professional debut for Gent on the 9 December 2021, replacing Michael Ngadeu-Ngadjui at the 62nd minute of a 1–0 Europa Conference League home win against Flora.

=== Schalke 04 ===
On 3 May 2022, Cissé agreed to join Schalke 04 on a free transfer for the 2022–23 season, signing a four-year contract.

=== Aarau ===
On 2 January 2026, Cissé joined Aarau.

== International career ==
Cissé was an under-20 international with Mali, with whom it took part in the 2021 U-20 Africa Cup of Nations qualifiers. He played at the 2023 U-23 Africa Cup of Nations with Mali's under-23 international, where he won the bronze medal with his team and was named on the Team of the Tournament. He was selected for Mali's Olympic team for the 2024 Summer Olympics in Paris.

Cissé received his first call up to the senior team for the Africa Cup of Nations qualification in October 2024. He made his debut on 19 November 2024, coming on as a substitute in a 6–0 home win over Eswatini.

== Career statistics ==
=== Club ===
As of 6 July 2026

Appearances and goals by club, season and competition
Club	Season	League			National cup (Note: Includes DFB-Pokal)		Europe		Total	
Club	Season	Division	Apps	Goals	Apps	Goals	Apps	Goals	Apps	Goals
Gent	2021–22	First Division A	2	0	0	0	1 (Note: Appearance in UEFA Conference League)	0	3	0
Schalke 04 II	2022–23	Regionalliga West	16	5	—		—		16	5
Schalke 04 II	2023–24	Regionalliga West	7	0	—		—		7	0
Schalke 04 II	2024–25	Regionalliga West	1	0	—		—		1	0
Schalke 04 II	Total		24	5	—		—		24	5
Schalke 04	2022–23	Bundesliga	0	0	0	0	—		0	0
Schalke 04	2023–24	2. Bundesliga	4	0	1	0	—		5	0
Schalke 04	2024–25	2. Bundesliga	4	1	0	0	—		4	1
Schalke 04	2025–26	2. Bundesliga	0	0	0	0	—		0	0
Schalke 04	Total		8	1	1	0	—		9	1
Aarau	2025–26	Swiss Challenge League	0	0	—		—		0	0
Career total			34	6	1	0	1	0	36	6

=== International ===
As of match played 31 March 2026

Appearances and goals by national team and year
National team	Year	Apps	Goals
Mali	2024	1	0
Mali	2025	1	0
Mali	2026	1	0
Total		3	0

== Honours ==
Mali U23

- U-23 Africa Cup of Nations bronze medal: 2023
