= FC St. Gallen =

Swiss professional football club

FC St. Gallen 1879
- Full name: Fussballclub St. Gallen 1879
- Nickname: Espen
- Founded: 19 April 1879; 147 years ago
- Ground: Sitterstadion, St. Gallen
- Capacity: 20.660
- President: Matthias Hüppi
- Head coach: Enrico Maaßen
- League: Swiss Super League
- 2025–26: 2nd of 12
- Website: www.fcsg.ch
Home colours	Away colours	Third colours

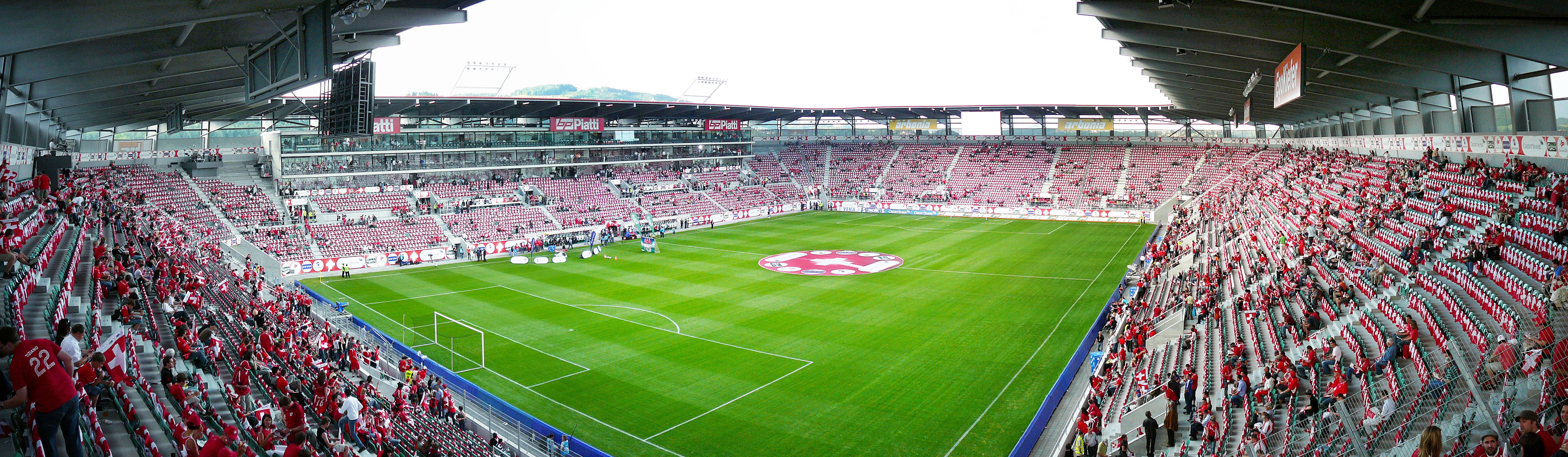
Sitterstadion

Fussballclub St. Gallen 1879, widely known as FC St. Gallen 1879 or FCSG, is a Swiss professional football club based in St. Gallen, in the Canton of St. Gallen. Formed in 1879, it is the oldest football club still in existence in Switzerland and continental Europe. The club has won the Swiss championship and the Swiss Cup twice each.

The team competes in the Swiss Super League, the top tier of Swiss football. Since 2008, the club has played its home games at the Sitterstadion. Their home colours are green and white, and their nickname is 'Espen'.

== History ==
=== Foundation and early decades (1879–1940s) ===
FC St. Gallen was founded on 19 April 1879, following an invitation published in the local newspaper, the St. Galler Tagblatt. The inaugural meeting took place at the Restaurant Hörnli on Neugasse, making it the oldest football club still in existence in Switzerland and continental Europe. During its first decades, the club integrated several other local football teams from the region.

In 1902, the club played its first international friendly match, defeating Alemannia Karlsruhe 26–0. On 22 June 1903, the club officially adopted the name FC St. Gallen and secured its first Swiss Championship during the 1903–04 season. In 1910, the club moved to the Espenmoos stadium. Following a period of decline, the club was relegated in 1932 but returned to the top tier under player-coach Norman Smith. The club later reached its first Swiss Cup final in 1945, which was immediately followed by another brief relegation.

=== Post-war period and second championship (1950s–2001) ===
The mid-20th century was marked by heavy fluctuations, including a drop to the third-tier 1. Liga in 1957 before the club successfully fought its way back to the top flight in 1968. In 1969, FC St. Gallen won its first Swiss Cup title by defeating AC Bellinzona 2–0. The subsequent decades were highlighted by a famous 0–0 UEFA Cup draw against Inter Milan in 1985 in front of a record crowd, and the goalscoring exploits of Chilean star Iván Zamorano in 1990.

Following a temporary decline in the early 1990s, the club achieved renewed success later in the decade under the management of Marcel Koller. During the 1999–2000 season, FC St. Gallen won its second Swiss Championship, enabling the club to compete in the qualification rounds of the 2000–01 UEFA Champions League and subsequently in the UEFA Cup, where they achieved a historic aggregate victory over English club Chelsea FC.

=== Relegations and transition to the new stadium (2002–2017) ===
Following this successful era, the club faced financial difficulties and declining league performance. In 2008, FC St. Gallen moved from its historic stadium, the Espenmoos, to the newly constructed AFG Arena (now the Sitterstadion). Due to relegation at the end of the 2007–08 season, the club's first season in the new stadium was played in the second-tier Challenge League.

The club achieved immediate promotion back to the top division for the 2009–10 season but was relegated again at the end of the 2010–11 campaign. Under manager Jeff Saibene, FC St. Gallen secured immediate promotion as Challenge League champions in 2012 and subsequently finished third in the 2012–13 Swiss Super League. In August 2013, the club defeated Russian side FC Spartak Moscow in the play-off round to qualify for the 2013–14 UEFA Europa League group stage, where they competed against Valencia CF, Swansea City, and FC Kuban Krasnodar. Following this European campaign, the club re-established itself as a consistent mid-table team in the Swiss Super League.

=== Modern era and recent success (2018–present) ===
The club's modern ascent began following the appointment of Matthias Hüppi as club president in early 2018. Hüppi's leadership established a new structural and financial foundation, which became a fundamental cornerstone for the club's subsequent sporting success. Under his presidency, German head coach Peter Zeidler was appointed ahead of the 2018–19 season. Leading the team until 2024, Zeidler implemented an aggressive, high-pressing style of football that revitalized the club. This philosophy led them to a runners-up finish in the 2019–20 Swiss Super League season. In the following season, the club competed in the qualifying rounds of the UEFA Europa League, where they were eliminated by AEK Athens in the third round. Zeidler also guided the team to consecutive Swiss Cup finals in 2021 and 2022, though the club lost both matches.

Following Zeidler's departure, Enrico Maaßen took over as head coach ahead of the 2024–25 season. In his debut campaign, Maaßen successfully led the club through the qualification rounds of the UEFA Conference League, defeating Turkish side Trabzonspor in the play-off round to enter the league phase. This marked a significant return to European group-stage football. Under his guidance, the club continued its upward trajectory, achieving another strong 2nd-place finish in the 2025–26 season. The campaign was crowned by winning the Swiss Cup final with a 3–0 victory against FC Stade Lausanne-Ouchy, marking their first major domestic trophy since 2000. By winning the cup, the club earned a spot in the qualification rounds for the UEFA Europa League for the upcoming season.

== Support and rivalries ==
=== Attendance and regional identity ===
FC St. Gallen draws supporters from the entire Eastern Switzerland (Ostschweiz) region, including areas outside the Canton of St. Gallen. This geographic spread contributes to a strong regional identification with the team. The club consistently records the third-highest average attendance in the Swiss Super League, behind BSC Young Boys and FC Basel. Home matches are regularly well-attended, with the organized supporter scene located in the 'Espenblock' section. Supporters also travel to away games, with notably high turnouts during European matches.

=== Rivalries ===
During the late 20th century, matches against Grasshopper Club Zürich formed a prominent rivalry. This fixture was heavily fueled by the cultural contrast between Zürich's metropolitan dominance and the proud regional identity of Eastern Switzerland. The rivalry peaked during the final match of the 2000–01 season, when a 0–4 home defeat to Grasshoppers snatched the league title away from St. Gallen, while also ending their 35-match home unbeaten streak.

In the modern era, a sporting rivalry exists with FC Luzern, which is intensely felt both on and off the pitch. Although the two clubs are not in close geographic proximity, the fixture is highly important for both fanbases due to their shared profile and identity. Both clubs represent major regional fanbases situated outside the country's largest metropolitan areas, sharing a history of competing for domestic titles from similar structural positions.

=== Fan friendships ===
The active supporter groups of FC St. Gallen have maintained an official fan friendship (Fanfreundschaft) with the German club SSV Reutlingen 05 since 2006. In addition, there are loose connections between certain supporter groups and fans of VfB Stuttgart.

== Stadium ==
FC St. Gallen play their home games at the Sitterstadion, located on the west side of town. The stadium has a capacity of 20,660, which is reduced to 17,317 for international matches, and replaced the former Espenmoos in the east. Opened in 2008 as the AFG Arena, named after its initial naming rights sponsor, the Arbonia-Forster-Group, the venue was later sponsored as Kybunpark from 2016 to 2026.

In 2026, it received its current name following a fan vote, an initiative heavily driven by the active fan scene campaigning for a sponsor-free stadium name. The venue is widely considered one of the most popular in Switzerland among both players and fans, with its steep grandstands creating an intimidating atmosphere. Additionally, the Swiss national football team regularly uses the stadium as a host venue for international matches, and it served as an official host venue for the UEFA Women's Euro 2025.

== Honours ==
=== Domestic ===
==== League ====
- Swiss Super League
  - Winners: 1903–04, 1999–2000
  - Runners-up: 2019–20, 2025–26
- Swiss Challenge League
  - Winners: 1970–71, 2008–09, 2011–12
  - Runners-up: 1967–68

==== Cup ====
- Swiss Cup
  - Winners: 1968–69, 2025–26
  - Runners-up: 1944–45, 1976–77, 1997–98, 2020–21, 2021–22
- Swiss League Cup
  - Winners: 1977–78
  - Runners-up: 1981–82

==== Others ====
- Anglo Cup
  - Runners-up: 1910

== European record ==
=== Overall record ===
Accurate as of 1 January 2025

Competition	Played	Won	Drew	Lost	GF	GA	GD	Win%
European Cup / Champions League	2	0	1	1	3	4	−1	0.00
Cup Winners' Cup	4	1	1	2	2	6	−4	25.00
UEFA Cup / UEFA Europa League	25	8	4	13	28	42	−14	32.00
UEFA Conference League	12	4	4	4	20	23	−3	33.33
UEFA Intertoto Cup	10	6	1	3	24	10	+14	60.00
Total	47	18	9	20	67	67	+0	38.30

Legend: GF = Goals For. GA = Goals Against. GD = Goal Difference.

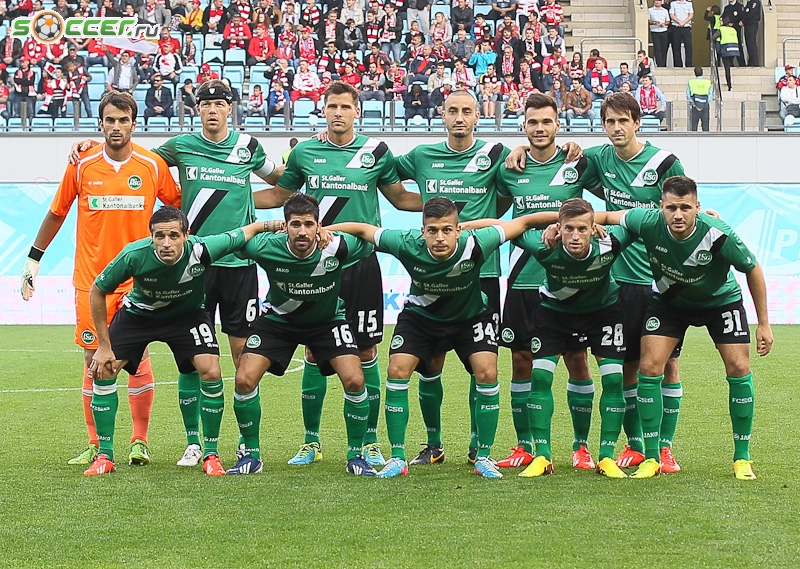
St. Gallen 2013

Season	Competition	Round	Opponent	Home	Away	Aggregate
1969–70	European Cup Winners' Cup	First round	(Denmark) BK Frem	1–0	1–2	2–2 (a)
1969–70	European Cup Winners' Cup	Second round	(Bulgaria) Levski Sofia	0–0	0–4	0–4
1983–84	UEFA Cup	First round	(Socialist Federal Republic of Yugoslavia) Radnički Niš	1–2	0–3	1–5
1985–86	UEFA Cup	First round	(Italy) Inter Milan	0–0	1–5	1–5
1998	UEFA Intertoto Cup	First round	(Estonia) Viljandi JK Tulevik	3–2	6–1	9–3
1998	UEFA Intertoto Cup	Second round	Austria Salzburg	1–0	1–3	2–3
2000–01	UEFA Champions League	Third qualifying round	(Turkey) Galatasaray	1–2	2–2	3–4
2000–01	UEFA Cup	First round	(England) Chelsea	2–0	0–1	2–1
2000–01	UEFA Cup	Second round	(Belgium) Club Brugge	1–1	1–2	2–3
2001–02	UEFA Cup	Qualifying round	(North Macedonia) Pelister	2–3	2–0	4–3
2001–02	UEFA Cup	First round	(Romania) Steaua București	2–1	1–1	3–2
2001–02	UEFA Cup	Second round	(Germany) Freiburg	1–4	1–0	2–4
2002	UEFA Intertoto Cup	First round	(Faroe Islands) B68 Toftir	5–1	6–0	11–1
2002	UEFA Intertoto Cup	Second round	(Netherlands) Willem II	1–1 (a.e.t.)	0–1	1–2
2007	UEFA Intertoto Cup	Second round	(Moldova) Dacia Chişinău	0–1 (a.e.t.)	1–0	1–1 (0–3 p)
2013–14	UEFA Europa League	Play-off	(Russia) Spartak Moscow	1–1	4–2	5–3
2013–14	UEFA Europa League	Group A	(Spain) Valencia	2–3	1–5	4th place
2013–14	UEFA Europa League	Group A	(England) Swansea City	1–0	0–1	4th place
2013–14	UEFA Europa League	Group A	(Russia) Kuban Krasnodar	2–0	0–4	4th place
2018–19	UEFA Europa League	Second qualifying round	(Norway) Sarpsborg 08	2–1	0–1	2–2 (a)
2020–21	UEFA Europa League	Third qualifying round	(Greece) AEK Athens	0–1	—N/a	0–1
2024–25	UEFA Conference League	Second qualifying round	(Kazakhstan) FC Tobol	4–1	1–0	5–1
2024–25	UEFA Conference League	Third qualifying round	(Poland) Śląsk Wrocław	2–0	2–3	4–3
2024–25	UEFA Conference League	Play-off	(Turkey) Trabzonspor	0–0	1–1 (a.e.t.)	1–1 (5–4 p)
2024–25	UEFA Conference League	League phase	(Italy) Fiorentina	2-4	—N/a	29th place
2024–25	UEFA Conference League	League phase	(Germany) 1. FC Heidenheim	—N/a	1-1	29th place
2024–25	UEFA Conference League	League phase	(Portugal) Vitória de Guimarães	1-4	—N/a	29th place
2024–25	UEFA Conference League	League phase	(Belgium) Cercle Brugge	—N/a	2-6	29th place
2024–25	UEFA Conference League	League phase	(Serbia) TSC	2-2	—N/a	29th place
2024–25	UEFA Conference League	League phase	(Northern Ireland) Larne	—N/a	2–1	29th place
2026–27	UEFA Europa League	Second qualifying round	(Portugal) Benfica	2–1	0–5	2–6
2026–27	UEFA Conference League	Play-offs round	(Denmark) Nordsjælland	1–0		

== Players ==
=== Current squad ===
As of 25 September 2026

Note: Flags indicate national team as defined under FIFA eligibility rules; some limited exceptions apply. Players may hold more than one non-FIFA nationality.

No.	Pos.	Nation	Player
1	GK	GHA	Lawrence Ati-Zigi
2	DF	SUI	Cyrill May
3	DF	GER	Colin Kleine-Bekel (on loan from Bochum)
4	DF	CRO	Jozo Stanić
5	DF	GHA	Stephan Ambrosius
6	MF	KOS	Behar Neziri
7	MF	SUI	Christian Witzig
8	MF	SUI	Nino Weibel
9	FW	SUI	Andrin Hunziker
10	MF	GER	Lukas Daschner
11	MF	GER	Carlo Boukhalfa
14	FW	GUI	Aliou Baldé
16	MF	GER	Lukas Görtler (captain)
20	MF	KOS	Leon Frokaj
21	FW	FRA	Malamine Efekele

No.	Pos.	Nation	Player
23	MF	KOS	Betim Fazliji
25	GK	GER	Lukas Watkowiak
26	DF	GER	Tom Gaal
27	MF	HUN	Kevin Csoboth
28	DF	FRA	Hugo Vandermersch
31	FW	SUI	Diego Besio
35	GK	GER	Bela Dumrath
36	DF	GER	Chima Okoroji
47	FW	ITA	Enoch Owusu
63	MF	SUI	Corsin Konietzke
64	MF	SRB	Mihailo Stevanović
67	FW	ESP	Jorge Rans
70	FW	SUI	Nevio Scherrer
74	DF	SUI	Joel Ruiz
81	GK	SUI	Yannick Bujard

=== Out on loan ===
Note: Flags indicate national team as defined under FIFA eligibility rules; some limited exceptions apply. Players may hold more than one non-FIFA nationality.

No.	Pos.	Nation	Player
—	GK	SUI	Gentrit Muslija (at Wil until 30 June 2027)
—	DF	SUI	Tarik Seferovic (at Wil until 30 June 2027)

No.	Pos.	Nation	Player
—	MF	ESP	Jordi Quintillà (at Nea Salamis until 30 June 2027)
—	FW	CRO	Antonio Verinac (at Austria Lustenau until 30 June 2027)

=== Retired numbers ===
Note: Flags indicate national team as defined under FIFA eligibility rules; some limited exceptions apply. Players may hold more than one non-FIFA nationality.

No.	Pos.	Nation	Player
17	DF	SUI	Marc Zellweger (1994–2001, 2003–2010)

== Club officials ==
As of 19 June 2026

Position	Staff
Management & Board
Chairman	(Switzerland) Matthias Hüppi
Board member	(Switzerland) Peter Germann
Sporting director	(Switzerland) Roger Stilz
Director of development	(Switzerland) Jan Breitenmoser
Technical Staff
Head coach	(Germany) Enrico Maaßen
Assistant manager	(Germany) Sebastian Block
Assistant manager	(Germany) Marvin Compper
Assistant manager	(Germany) Jonas Maier
Goalkeeping coach	(Italy) Stefano Razzetti
Athletic coach	(Austria) Simon Storm
Chief scout	(Scotland) Nnamdi Aghanya

== Coaches ==
- (England) Jack Reynolds (1912–14)
- (England) William Townley (1920)
- (Austria) Leopold Grundwald (1922)
- (England) William Townley (1923–25)
- (England) Jimmy Townley (1945–49)
- (England) Robert Kelly (1949–51)
- (Germany) Fritz Kerr (1952–54)
- (Germany) Otto Pfister (1963–66)
- (Romania) Virgil Popescu (1966–67)
- (Switzerland) René Brodmann (1967–68)
- (Germany) Albert Sing (1968–70)
- (Socialist Federal Republic of Yugoslavia) Željko Perušić (1970–74)
- (Germany) Helmuth Johannsen (1 July 1981 – 30 June 1985)
- (Germany) Werner Olk (1985–86)
- (Germany) Uwe Klimaschefski (1 July 1986 – 1 March 1987)
- (Austria) Kurt Jara (1 July 1988 – 1 October 1991)
- (Germany) Uwe Rapolder (1 July 1993 – 10 April 1996)
- (Switzerland) Werner Zünd (interim) (11 April 1996 – 25 April 1996)
- (Switzerland) Roger Hegi (26 April 1996 – 31 December 1998)
- (Switzerland) Marcel Koller (1 Jan 1999 – 31 December 2001)
- (Switzerland) Gérard Castella (20 Feb 2002 – 15 September 2002)
- (Switzerland) Thomas Staub (interim) (20 Sep 2002 – 9 December 2002)
- (Austria) Heinz Peischl (1 March 2003 – 8 April 2005)
- (Switzerland) Werner Zünd (interim) (29 April 2004 – 30 May 2005)
- (Switzerland) René Weiler (interim) (13 April 2005 – 29 April 2005)
- (Germany) Ralf Loose (1 July 2005 – 10 April 2006)
- (Switzerland) Werner Zünd (interim) (10 April 2006 – 12 April 2006)
- (Austria) Rolf Fringer (12 April 2006 – 8 October 2007)
- (Bulgaria) Krassimir Balakov (29 Oct 2007 – 30 June 2008)
- (Switzerland) Uli Forte (1 July 2008 – 1 March 2011)
- (Switzerland) Giorgio Contini / (Switzerland) Roger Zürcher (interim) (1 March 2011 – 7 March 2011)
- (Luxembourg) Jeff Saibene (7 March 2011 –2015)
- (Germany) Josef Zinnbauer (16 September 2015 – 4 May 2017)
- (Switzerland) Giorgio Contini (4 May 2017 – 1 April 2018)
- (Germany) Peter Zeidler (18 June 2018 – 30 June 2024)
- (Germany) Enrico Maaßen (1 July 2024–)

== Former players ==
- (Switzerland) Paul Friberg
- Jerzy Gorgon
- (Chile) Iván Zamorano
