= Jimmy Townley =

English footballer

Personal information
- Full name: James Chadwick Townley
- Date of birth: 2 May 1902
- Place of birth: Blackburn, England
- Date of death: 3.2.1983
- Position: Outside left

Senior career*
Years	Team	Apps	(Gls)
- SC Victoria Hamburg
- St. Gallen
1927	Tottenham Hotspur	3	(2)
1928	Brighton & Hove Albion	9	(0)
1929–1930	Clapton Orient	19	(2)

Managerial career
- 1945–1949: St. Gallen
- 1949–1950: FC Thun
- * Club domestic league appearances and goals

James Chadwick Townley (2 May 1902 – 1983) was an English professional footballer who played SC Victoria Hamburg, FC St. Gallen, Chelsea, Tottenham Hotspur, Brighton & Hove Albion and Clapton Orient.

== Career ==
Townley played for the German team SC Victoria Hamburg which was then coached by his father, William Townley, before both of them joined Swiss club FC St. Gallen in 1923.

In 1924 Townley had an unsuccessful trial with Chelsea. The outside left then signed for Tottenham Hotspur in 1927 where he participated in three matches and found the back of the net twice. Scoring on his Lilywhites debut in a 3–1 defeat to Everton at White Hart Lane in October 1927 in the old First Division.

He left London to play for Brighton & Hove Albion and to feature in a further nine matches.

In 1929 he joined Clapton Orient where he made 19 appearances and scored two goals. He left Clapton Orient in 1930 to resume his career in Switzerland.
