= Moritz Jenz =

German football player (born 1999)

Personal information
- Date of birth: 30 April 1999 (age 27)
- Place of birth: Berlin, Germany
- Height: 1.90 m (6 ft 3 in)
- Position: Centre-back

Team information
- Current team: Young Boys
- Number: 4

Youth career
- –2015: Tennis Borussia Berlin
- 2015–2020: Fulham

Senior career*
Years	Team	Apps	(Gls)
2020–2021	Lausanne-Sport	32	(1)
2021–2023	Lorient	17	(1)
2022–2023	→ Celtic (loan)	11	(2)
2023	→ Schalke 04 (loan)	11	(0)
2023–2026	VfL Wolfsburg	44	(1)
2024–2025	→ Mainz 05 (loan)	19	(0)
2026–	Young Boys	1	(0)
- * Club domestic league appearances and goals as of 19 September 2026

Moritz Jenz (born 30 April 1999) is a German professional footballer who plays as a centre-back for Swiss Super League club Young Boys.

== Career ==
=== Early career ===
Jenz joined the academy of English side Fulham in July 2015 after being scouted playing for Tennis Borussia Berlin.

=== Lausanne-Sport ===
On 25 August 2020, Jenz joined newly-promoted Swiss Super League side Lausanne-Sport on a permanent deal. The following month, he made his professional debut, coming on as a late substitute in a 2–1 win over Servette.

=== Lorient ===
On 30 August 2021, Jenz signed a five-year deal with French Ligue 1 side Lorient.

==== Loan to Celtic ====
On 19 July 2022, Jenz joined Scottish Premiership side Celtic on a season-long loan, with the club having the option of making the move permanent. This saw Jenz reunited with his former Fulham teammate Matt O'Riley. The following month, Jenz scored on his league debut at Ross County On 6 September 2022, Jenz made his UEFA Champions League debut in a 3–0 home defeat against Real Madrid.

In an interview with German website Transfermarkt, Jenz spoke of his admiration for Celtic with him quoted as saying (in German): “Celtic is old school, Celtic is mysterious, Celtic is pure football and above all Celtic is a religion. When you stand at a home game, close your eyes and get goosebumps just from the chants, you know why this club fascinates the world”. Popular with Celtic fans, he is often called by his nickname “Mercedes Jenz”. Although Jenz expressed his desire to remain at Celtic beyond his loan spell - it would later be terminated in January after lack of playing opportunities from November onwards due to the winter arrival of Yuki Kobayashi and regular starting centreback Carl Starfelt returning from injury.

==== Loan to Schalke 04 ====
On 26 January 2023, Jenz returned to his native country and joined Bundesliga club Schalke 04 on loan until the end of the season, with the move becoming permanent if his new club avoid relegation in the 2022–23 season. Three days later, he made his debut for the club in a 0–0 draw against 1. FC Köln. Jenz appeared in 11 matches as Schalke failed to climb out of the relegation zone, finishing in 17th. Following the season, despite Jenz expressing his desire to stay with Schalke, the team confirmed that they would not push to sign Jenz permanently, and he would return to Lorient on 30 June.

=== VfL Wolfsburg ===
On 16 June 2023, Bundesliga side VfL Wolfsburg announced they had agreed to terms with Lorient to sign Jenz on a 4-year contract for an undisclosed fee.

==== Loan to Mainz 05 ====
On 28 August 2024, Jenz moved on a season-long loan to Mainz 05.

=== Young Boys ===
On 8 September 2026, Jenz returned to Switzerland and signed with Young Boys until the end of the 2026–27 season.

== Personal life ==
Jenz was born in Germany to a Nigerian father and German mother, making him eligible to play for the Nigerian national team. However, his desire was to represent Germany at international level.

== Career statistics ==
As of match played 12 September 2026.

Appearances and goals by club, season and competition
Club	Season	League			National cup		League cup		Europe		Total	
Club	Season	Division	Apps	Goals	Apps	Goals	Apps	Goals	Apps	Goals	Apps	Goals
Lausanne-Sport	2020–21	Swiss Super League	30	1	1	0	–		–		31	1
Lausanne-Sport	2021–22	Swiss Super League	2	0	0	0	–		–		2	0
Lausanne-Sport	Total		32	1	1	0	–		–		33	1
Lorient	2021–22	Ligue 1	17	1	1	0	–		–		18	1
Celtic (loan)	2022–23	Scottish Premiership	11	2	0	0	2	0	6 (Note: Appearances in UEFA Champions League)	0	19	2
Schalke 04 (loan)	2022–23	Bundesliga	11	0	–		–		–		11	0
VfL Wolfsburg	2023–24	Bundesliga	22	0	1	0	–		–		23	0
VfL Wolfsburg	2025–26	Bundesliga	21	1	1	1	–		–		22	2
VfL Wolfsburg	Total		43	1	2	1	–		–		45	2
Mainz 05 (loan)	2024–25	Bundesliga	20	0	1	0	–		–		21	0
Young Boys	2026–27	Swiss Super League	1	0	0	0	–		–		1	0
Career total			135	5	5	1	2	0	6	0	148	6
