= Matthias Kreutzer =

German football coach (born 1982)

Personal information
- Date of birth: 23 December 1982 (age 43)
- Place of birth: Erfurt, East Germany

Managerial career
- Years: Team
- 2022: Schalke 04 (interim)
- 2023: Schalke 04 (interim)

Matthias Kreutzer (born 23 December 1982) is a German football coach.

== Career ==
On 20 October 2022, Kreutzer took over Schalke 04 as head coach on an interim basis after Frank Kramer was sacked by the club. His tenure was over after a week, when a new coach, Thomas Reis, was hired. After Reis was fired on 27 September 2023, he became Schalke's interim head coach again and was replaced two weeks later.

== Managerial statistics ==
Managerial record by team and tenure
Team	From	To	Record					Ref
Team	From	To	G	W	D	L	Win %	Ref
Schalke 04	20 October 2022	27 October 2022	1	0	0	1	0.00	
Schalke 04	27 September 2023	8 October 2023	2	0	0	2	0.00	
Total			3	0	0	3	0.00	
