= Werner Zünd =

Swiss football manager

Personal information
- Date of birth: 23 January 1948 (age 78)
- Place of birth: Rebstein, Switzerland

Managerial career
- Years: Team
- 1989–2007: St. Gallen (assistant)
- 1996: → St. Gallen (caretaker manager)
- 2005: → St. Gallen (caretaker manager)
- 2009: FC Gossau (caretaker manager)

Werner Zünd (born 23 January 1948) is a Swiss football manager.
