= Enrico Maaßen =

German footballer and manager

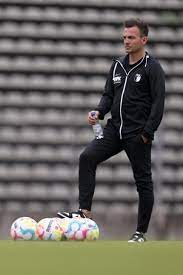
- Maaßen in 2023

Personal information
- Date of birth: 10 March 1984 (age 42)
- Place of birth: Wismar, East Germany
- Height: 1.78 m (5 ft 10 in)
- Position: Midfielder

Youth career
- Grevesmühlener FC
- SKV Bobitz
- Anker Wismar

Senior career*
Years	Team	Apps	(Gls)
2003–2005	Anker Wismar		
2005–2006	Hansa Rostock II	10	(0)
2006–2007	Greifswalder SV		
2007–2009	SC Verl	22	(0)
2009–2011	Goslarer SC	56	(5)
2011–2014	SV Drochtersen/Assel		
Total		88	(5)

Managerial career
- 2014–2018: SV Drochtersen/Assel
- 2018–2020: SV Rödinghausen
- 2020–2022: Borussia Dortmund II
- 2022–2023: FC Augsburg
- 2024–: FC St. Gallen
- * Club domestic league appearances and goals

Enrico Maaßen (born 10 March 1984) is a German professional football manager. He is the current head coach of Swiss Super League side St. Gallen.

== Playing career ==
A FC Anker Wismar youth graduate, Maaßen only played amateur football during his entire career. He subsequently represented Hansa Rostock II, Greifswalder SV, SC Verl, Goslarer SC and SV Drochtersen/Assel, retiring with the latter in 2014 at the age of 30, after suffering a serious knee injury.

== Managerial career ==
Immediately after retiring, Maaßen was named manager of his last club Drochtersen/Assel. Drochtersen/Assel finished first and won promotion to the Regionalliga Nord during the 2014–15 Oberliga Niedersachsen season and finished fourth during the 2015–16 season. In the 2016–17 DFB-Pokal, Drochtersen/Assel were knocked out by Borussia Mönchengladbach. They finished the league season in ninth place. They finished 12th in the 2017–18 season. On 7 March 2018, after nearly four years in charge, his club confirmed that he would leave the post at the end of the season, and he was confirmed as manager of Rödinghausen for the 2018–19 campaign seven days later.

On 12 June 2020, Maaßen was appointed manager of Borussia Dortmund's reserve team, replacing Mike Tullberg. He renewed his contract until 2024 on 21 May of the following year, and achieved promotion to the 3. Liga with the side on 7 June 2021 after a 2–1 win over Wuppertaler SV. In the summer of 2022, he left Dortmund and joined FC Augsburg. He was sacked in October 2023.

On 8 June 2024, he was announced as FC St. Gallen's new head coach.

== Coaching record ==
As of match played 7 October 2023

Team	From	To	Record					Ref.
Team	From	To	G	W	D	L	Win %	Ref.
SV Drochtersen/Assel	1 July 2014	30 June 2018	145	70	40	35	48.28	
SV Rödinghausen	1 July 2018	12 June 2020	73	47	12	14	64.38	
Borussia Dortmund II	12 June 2020	8 June 2022	76	41	19	16	53.95	
FC Augsburg	8 June 2022	9 October 2023	44	11	9	24	25.00	
Total			338	169	80	89	50.00	—
