= Sebastian Hoeneß =

German footballer and manager

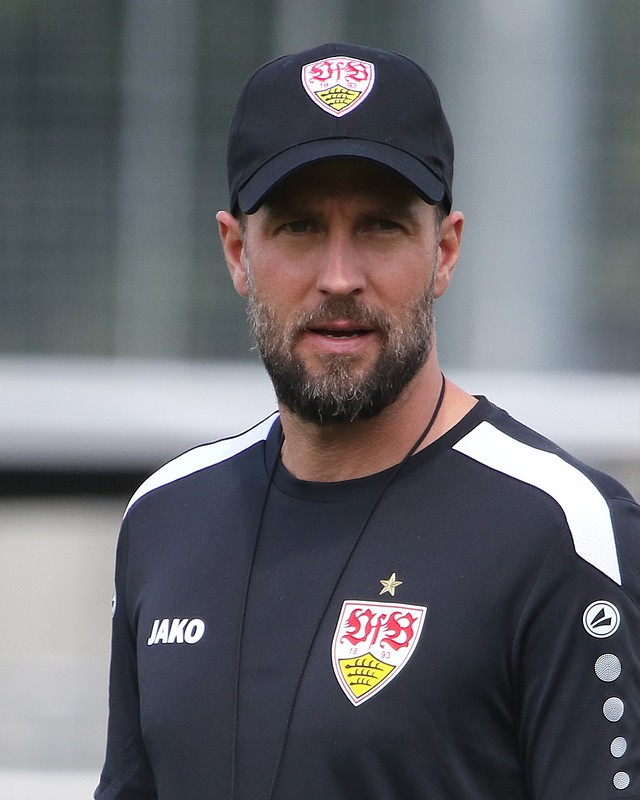
- Hoeneß managing VfB Stuttgart in 2023

Personal information
- Full name: Sebastian Hoeneß
- Date of birth: 12 May 1982 (age 44)
- Place of birth: Munich, West Germany
- Height: 1.80 m (5 ft 11 in)
- Position: Attacking midfielder

Team information
- Current team: VfB Stuttgart (head coach)

Youth career
- TSV Ottobrunn
- TSV Grötzingen
- –1999: VfB Stuttgart
- 1999–2001: Hertha BSC

Senior career*
Years	Team	Apps	(Gls)
2001–2006	Hertha BSC II	101	(14)
2006–2007	TSG Hoffenheim	3	(0)
2006–2007	TSG Hoffenheim II	5	(0)
2007–2010	Hertha BSC II	63	(15)
Total		172	(29)

Managerial career
- 2019–2020: Bayern Munich II
- 2020–2022: TSG Hoffenheim
- 2023–: VfB Stuttgart
- * Club domestic league appearances and goals

Sebastian Hoeneß (German pronunciation: [zeˈbasti̯an ˈhøːnɛs]; born 12 May 1982) is a German professional football coach and former player. He is currently head coach for Bundesliga club VfB Stuttgart.

Hoeneß played as an attacking midfielder, who spent the majority of his career with Hertha BSC II.

Upon becoming a manager, he spent two seasons in charge of TSG Hoffenheim before being appointed at Stuttgart in April 2023.

== Playing career ==
In his youth, Hoeneß played for TSV Ottobrunn, TSV Grötzingen and VfB Stuttgart. In his senior career, he played for Hertha BSC II and TSG Hoffenheim. He ended his playing career in 2010.

== Managerial career ==
=== Bayern Munich II ===
Hoeneß began his managerial career with the Hertha Zehlendorf under-19 team from 2011 to 2013. He later coached the youth teams of RB Leipzig from 2014 to 2017. Between 2017 and 2019, he coached the Bayern Munich under-19 team, before replacing Holger Seitz in 2019 as manager of the club's reserve team, who were promoted in the previous season to the 3. Liga. In his first season, Hoeneß led the team to win their first 3. Liga title, and was awarded the league's manager of the season award.

=== Hoffenheim ===
On 27 July 2020, Bundesliga club TSG Hoffenheim announced Hoeneß as their new manager for the 2020–21 season, signing a three-year contract until 30 June 2023. After finishing in ninth place in the 2021–22 season, Hoffenheim and Hoeneß parted ways.

=== Stuttgart ===
In April 2023, Hoeneß took over VfB Stuttgart. Hoeneß led the club from the bottom of the table into the relegation play-offs of the 2022–23 Bundesliga, in which Stuttgart defeated Hamburg. On 8 March 2024, Sebastian Hoeneß extended his contract with VfB Stuttgart until the summer of 2027. In the 2023–24 season, he led the club to a UEFA Champions League berth for the first time since the 2009–10 season by finishing second, the club's best performance since 2007. In March 2025, he extended his contract with the club until 2028.

Despite losing the DFL Supercup to Bayer Leverkusen and finishing in ninth place in the Bundesliga, with a league phase exit in the Champions League, Hoeneß guided Stuttgart to the 2025 DFB-Pokal final, where they defeated third tier side Arminia Bielefeld 4–2 to give Stuttgart their fourth DFB Pokal title and first trophy since winning the 2006–07 Bundesliga title.

== Personal life ==
Sebastian Hoeneß is the son of former international Dieter Hoeneß, and the nephew of Uli Hoeneß, also a former international and the former president of Bayern Munich.

== Managerial statistics ==
As of match played 21 November 2026

Team	From	To	Record								
Team	From	To	M	W	D	L	GF	GA	GD	Win %	Ref.
Bayern Munich II	1 July 2019	27 July 2020	38	19	8	11	76	60	+16	50.00	
TSG Hoffenheim	27 July 2020	17 May 2022	81	31	21	29	143	132	+11	38.27	
VfB Stuttgart	3 April 2023	present	168	91	28	49	334	225	+109	54.17	
Total			287	141	57	89	556	418	+138	49.13	—

== Honours ==
=== Manager ===
Bayern Munich II

- 3. Liga: 2019–20

VfB Stuttgart

- DFB Pokal: 2024–25; runner-up: 2025–26

==== Individual ====
- 3. Liga Manager of the Season: 2020
