= Frank Kramer (footballer, born 1972) =

German footballer and manager

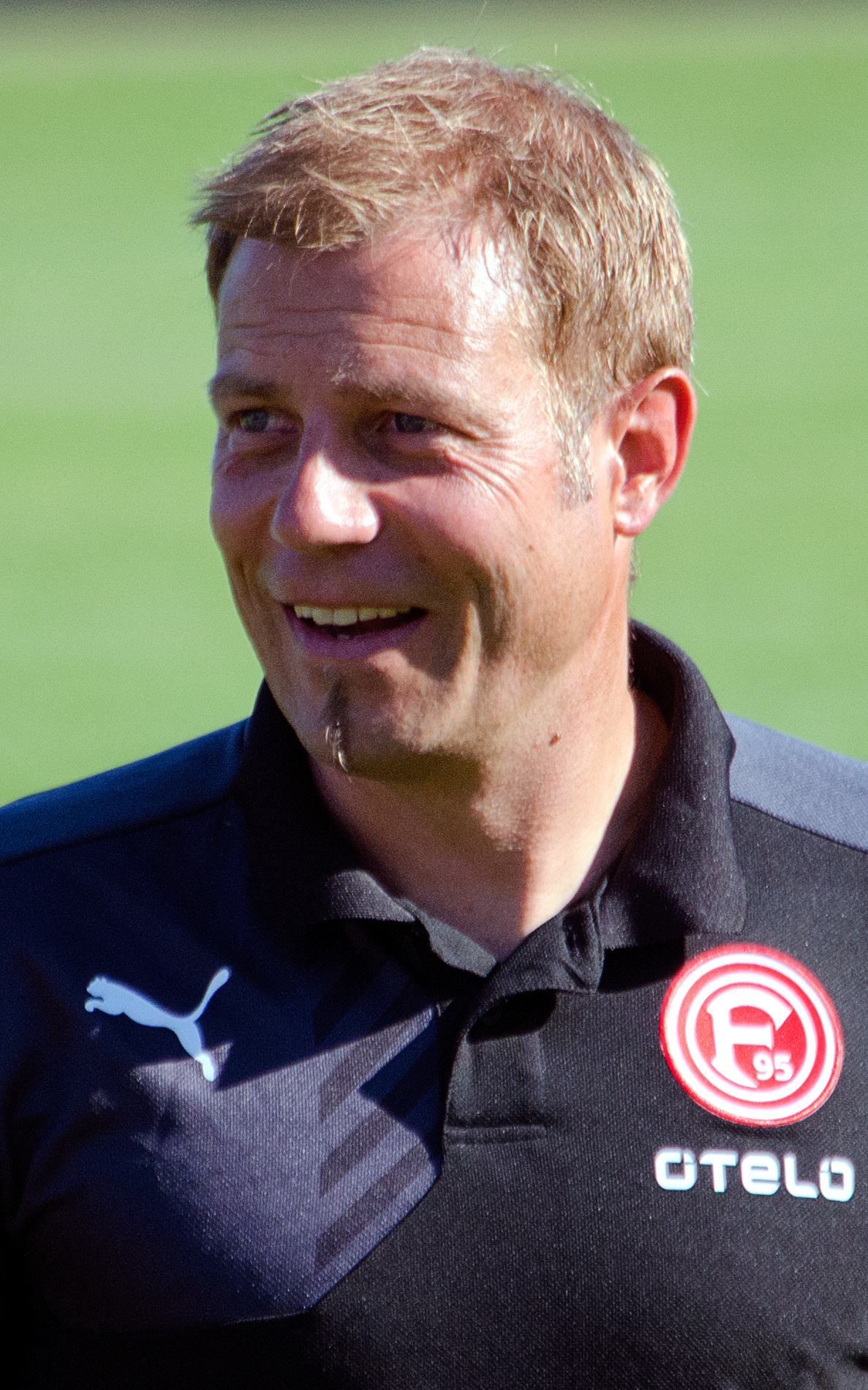
- Kramer as a coach of Fortuna Düsseldorf in 2015

Personal information
- Date of birth: 3 May 1972 (age 54)
- Place of birth: Memmingen, West Germany
- Height: 1.80 m (5 ft 11 in)
- Position: Midfielder

Youth career
- –1990: FC Memmingen

Senior career*
Years	Team	Apps	(Gls)
1990–1993	FC Memmingen	75	(8)
1993–1995	Bayern Munich II	27	(2)
1995–1996	TSV Vestenbergsgreuth	39	(1)
1996–1999	SC Weismain	82	(3)
1999–2001	1. FC Nürnberg II	40	(3)
2001–2002	Greuther Fürth II	27	(1)
2002–2003	1. SC Feucht	26	(1)
2003–2005	Greuther Fürth II	52	(14)
Total		368	(33)

Managerial career
- 2004: Greuther Fürth II
- 2005: Greuther Fürth II
- 2005–2009: Greuther Fürth U-19
- 2009–2011: Greuther Fürth II
- 2011–2012: TSG Hoffenheim II
- 2012: TSG Hoffenheim (caretaker)
- 2012–2013: TSG Hoffenheim II
- 2013–2015: Greuther Fürth
- 2015: Fortuna Düsseldorf
- 2016–2017: Germany U19
- 2017–2018: Germany U20
- 2018–2019: Germany U18
- 2021–2022: Arminia Bielefeld
- 2022: Schalke 04
- * Club domestic league appearances and goals

Frank Kramer (born 3 May 1972) is a former German football player and coach who last managed Schalke 04.

== Playing career ==
From 1990 to 2005 he played as semi-professional for FC Memmingen, Bayern Munich II, TSV Vestenbergsgreuth, SC Weismain, 1. FC Nürnberg II, Greuther Fürth II (two spells) and 1. SC Feucht.

== Managerial career ==
=== Early career ===
Kramer had three stints as Greuther Fürth II manager before moving to TSG Hoffenheim. At the club, Kramer had two stints as TSG Hoffenheim II manager. In between stints, Kramer was interim manager of the first team after the sacking of Markus Babbel.

=== Greuther Fürth ===
Greuther Fürth appointed Kramer as manager on 12 March 2013.

He was sacked on 23 February 2015.

=== Fortuna Düsseldorf ===
On 14 April 2015, it was announced that Kramer would be taking over as manager of Fortuna Düsseldorf from the beginning of the 2015–16 season. He had his first training session on 20 June 2015. He was sacked on 22 November 2015.

=== Germany youth ===
He was appointed as the head coach of the Germany U19 national team on 23 August 2016. In the following years, he also managed the U20- and U18 squad.

=== Red Bull Salzburg ===
Ahead of the 2019–20 season, Kramer was appointed head of the youth academy at FC Red Bull Salzburg.

=== Arminia Bielefeld ===
Kramer became manager of Bundesliga club Arminia Bielefeld on 2 March 2021, succeeding Uwe Neuhaus. He signed a contract until 2023. After a devastating record of six losses in seven games, Kramer was sacked on 20 April 2022.

=== Schalke 04 ===
He took over Schalke 04 in June 2022. After Schalke was second to last in the table after ten matchdays and a subsequent 5–1 defeat against 1899 Hoffenheim in the DFB-Pokal, Kramer was sacked on 19 October 2022.

== Managerial record ==
As of 19 October 2022

Team	From	To	Record				
Team	From	To	G	W	D	L	Win %
Greuther Fürth II	11 February 2004	30 June 2004	12	5	2	5	41.67
Greuther Fürth II	25 May 2005	30 June 2005	2	0	0	2	0.00
Greuther Fürth II	1 July 2009	30 June 2011	64	28	11	25	43.75
TSG Hoffenheim II	1 July 2011	2 December 2012	53	24	14	15	45.28
TSG Hoffenheim	3 December 2012	18 December 2012	2	0	0	2	0.00
TSG Hoffenheim II	18 December 2012	11 March 2013	1	1	0	0	100.00
Greuther Fürth	12 March 2013	23 February 2015	71	27	21	23	38.03
Fortuna Düsseldorf	20 June 2015	22 November 2015	15	3	4	8	20.00
Arminia Bielefeld	2 March 2021	20 April 2022	44	10	16	18	22.73
Schalke 04	7 June 2022	19 October 2022	12	2	3	7	16.67
Total			276	100	71	105	36.23
