= List of German football transfers summer 2023 =

This is a list of German football transfers in the summer transfer window 2023 by club. Only transfers of the Bundesliga, and 2. Bundesliga are included.

== Bundesliga ==
Note: Flags indicate national team as has been defined under FIFA eligibility rules. Players may hold more than one non-FIFA nationality.

=== Bayern Munich ===
In:

No.	Pos.	Nation	Player
3	DF	KOR	Kim Min-jae (from Napoli)
9	FW	ENG	Harry Kane (from Tottenham Hotspur)
18	GK	ISR	Daniel Peretz (from Maccabi Tel Aviv)
22	DF	POR	Raphaël Guerreiro (from Borussia Dortmund)
24	MF	AUT	Konrad Laimer (from RB Leipzig)
—	MF	AUT	Marcel Sabitzer (loan return from Manchester United)

Out:

No.	Pos.	Nation	Player
5	DF	FRA	Benjamin Pavard (to Inter Milan)
14	MF	GER	Paul Wanner (on loan to SV Elversberg)
17	FW	SEN	Sadio Mané (to Al Nassr)
21	DF	FRA	Lucas Hernandez (to Paris Saint-Germain)
22	DF	POR	João Cancelo (loan return to Manchester City)
23	DF	NED	Daley Blind (to Girona)
27	GK	SUI	Yann Sommer (to Inter Milan)
38	MF	NED	Ryan Gravenberch (to Liverpool)
44	DF	CRO	Josip Stanišić (on loan to Bayer Leverkusen)
—	GK	GER	Alexander Nübel (on loan to VfB Stuttgart)
—	DF	GER	Bright Arrey-Mbi (to Hannover 96, previously on loan)
—	MF	AUT	Marcel Sabitzer (to Borussia Dortmund)

=== Borussia Dortmund ===
In:

No.	Pos.	Nation	Player
5	DF	ALG	Ramy Bensebaini (from Borussia Mönchengladbach)
8	MF	GER	Felix Nmecha (from VfL Wolfsburg)
10	MF	BEL	Thorgan Hazard (loan return from PSV Eindhoven)
14	FW	GER	Niclas Füllkrug (from Werder Bremen)
20	MF	AUT	Marcel Sabitzer (from Bayern Munich)

Out:

No.	Pos.	Nation	Player
8	MF	GER	Mahmoud Dahoud (to Brighton & Hove Albion)
13	DF	POR	Raphaël Guerreiro (to Bayern Munich)
14	DF	GER	Nico Schulz (Released)
20	FW	FRA	Anthony Modeste (Released)
22	MF	ENG	Jude Bellingham (to Real Madrid)
30	DF	GER	Felix Passlack (to VfL Bochum)
38	GK	GER	Luca Unbehaun (Released)
42	MF	TUR	Göktan Gürpüz (to Trabzonspor)
—	MF	GER	Ansgar Knauff (to Eintracht Frankfurt, previously on loan)
—	FW	NED	Jayden Braaf (to Hellas Verona, previously on loan)

=== RB Leipzig ===
In:

No.	Pos.	Nation	Player
3	DF	GER	Christopher Lenz (from Eintracht Frankfurt)
5	DF	FRA	El Chadaille Bitshiabu (from Paris Saint-Germain)
13	MF	AUT	Nicolas Seiwald (from Red Bull Salzburg)
14	MF	AUT	Christoph Baumgartner (from 1899 Hoffenheim)
17	FW	BEL	Loïs Openda (from Lens)
18	MF	POR	Fábio Carvalho (on loan from Liverpool)
20	FW	NED	Xavi Simons (on loan from Paris Saint-Germain)
23	DF	FRA	Castello Lukeba (from Lyon)
25	GK	GER	Leopold Zingerle (from SC Paderborn)
—	DF	ESP	Angeliño (loan return from 1899 Hoffenheim)
—	MF	GER	Mehmet Ibrahimi (loan return from Eintracht Braunschweig)
—	MF	GER	Tom Krauß (loan return from Schalke 04)
—	MF	ESP	Hugo Novoa (loan return from Basel)

Out:

No.	Pos.	Nation	Player
13	GK	NOR	Ørjan Nyland (released)
17	MF	HUN	Dominik Szoboszlai (to Liverpool)
18	FW	FRA	Christopher Nkunku (to Chelsea)
23	DF	GER	Marcel Halstenberg (to Hannover 96)
25	DF	GER	Sanoussy Ba (on loan to LASK)
27	MF	AUT	Konrad Laimer (to Bayern Munich)
32	DF	CRO	Joško Gvardiol (to Manchester City)
34	GK	GER	Jonas Nickisch (to 1. FC Köln)
37	DF	SEN	Abdou Diallo (loan return to Paris Saint-Germain)
—	GK	ESP	Josep Martínez (to Genoa, previously on loan)
—	GK	GER	Tim Schreiber (on loan to 1. FC Saarbrücken)
—	DF	ESP	Angeliño (on loan to Galatasaray)
—	DF	GER	Daniel Ihendu (to Werder Bremen)
—	MF	GER	Tom Krauß (to Mainz 05)
—	FW	GER	Dennis Borkowski (on loan to Dynamo Dresden)
—	FW	NOR	Alexander Sørloth (to Villarreal)

=== Union Berlin ===
In:

No.	Pos.	Nation	Player
4	DF	POR	Diogo Leite (from Porto, previously on loan)
6	DF	GER	Robin Gosens (from Inter Milan)
7	MF	USA	Brenden Aaronson (on loan from Leeds United)
9	FW	DEN	Mikkel Kaufmann (from Copenhagen)
10	FW	GER	Kevin Volland (from Monaco)
11	FW	CIV	David Datro Fofana (on loan from Chelsea)
16	FW	GER	Benedict Hollerbach (to Wehen Wiesbaden)
23	DF	ITA	Leonardo Bonucci (from Juventus)
29	MF	FRA	Lucas Tousart (from Hertha BSC)
33	MF	CZE	Alex Král (on loan from Spartak Moscow)
—	GK	GER	Lennart Grill (from Bayer Leverkusen, previously on loan)
—	DF	POL	Tymoteusz Puchacz (loan return from Panathinaikos)
—	DF	NED	Rick van Drongelen (from Hansa Rostock)

Out:

No.	Pos.	Nation	Player
7	MF	GER	Levin Öztunalı (to Hamburger SV)
11	FW	GER	Sven Michel (to FC Augsburg)
14	MF	GER	Paul Seguin (to Schalke 04)
16	MF	GER	Tim Maciejewski (released)
23	DF	GER	Niko Gießelmann (released)
25	DF	GER	Timo Baumgartl (loan return to PSV)
37	GK	GER	Lennart Grill (on loan to VfL Osnabrück)
30	MF	GER	Kevin Möhwald (to Eupen)
40	MF	GER	Jamie Leweling (on loan to VfB Stuttgart)
45	FW	USA	Jordan Pefok (on loan to Borussia Mönchengladbach)
—	DF	POL	Tymoteusz Puchacz (on loan to 1. FC Kaiserslautern)
—	DF	NED	Rick van Drongelen (to Samsunspor)
—	MF	JPN	Keita Endo (on loan to Eintracht Braunschweig)
—	FW	GER	David Preu (on loan to VfR Aalen)
—	DF	GER	Dominique Heintz (to 1. FC Köln, previously on loan at VfL Bochum)
—	MF	GER	Tim Skarke (on loan to Darmstadt 98, previously on loan at FC Schalke 04)

=== SC Freiburg ===
In:

No.	Pos.	Nation	Player
20	FW	AUT	Junior Adamu (from Red Bull Salzburg)
21	GK	GER	Florian Müller (from VfB Stuttgart)
—	DF	GER	Maximilian Philipp (on loan from VfL Wolfsburg)

Out:

No.	Pos.	Nation	Player
23	MF	GER	Robert Wagner (on loan to Greuther Fürth)
24	DF	GER	Kimberly Ezekwem (on loan to SC Paderborn)
26	GK	NED	Mark Flekken (to Brentford)
29	MF	KOR	Jeong Woo-yeong (to VfB Stuttgart)
—	MF	GER	Yannik Engelhardt (to Fortuna Düsseldorf)
—	MF	GER	Lino Tempelmann (to Schalke 04)
—	FW	SUI	Nishan Burkart (to Winterthur, previously on loan)
—	FW	GER	Kevin Schade (to Brentford, previously on loan)
—	FW	NED	Vincent Vermeij (to Fortuna Düsseldorf)

=== Bayer Leverkusen ===
In:

No.	Pos.	Nation	Player
2	DF	CRO	Josip Stanišić (on loan from Bayern Munich)
7	MF	GER	Jonas Hofmann (from Borussia Mönchengladbach)
13	DF	BRA	Arthur (footballer, born 2003) (from América Mineiro)
17	GK	CZE	Matěj Kovář (from Manchester United)
19	MF	ENG	Nathan Tella (from Southampton)
20	DF	ESP	Álex Grimaldo (from Benfica)
22	FW	NGA	Victor Boniface (from Union SG)
34	MF	SUI	Granit Xhaka (from Arsenal)
32	MF	COL	Gustavo Puerta (loan return from 1. FC Nürnberg)

Out:

No.	Pos.	Nation	Player
5	DF	NED	Mitchel Bakker (to Atalanta)
10	MF	GER	Kerem Demirbay (to Galatasaray)
17	MF	ENG	Callum Hudson-Odoi (loan return to Chelsea)
19	MF	FRA	Moussa Diaby (to Aston Villa)
22	DF	NED	Daley Sinkgraven (Released)
32	MF	GER	Ayman Azhil (Released)
38	MF	GER	Karim Bellarabi (Released)
40	GK	RUS	Andrey Lunyov (Released)
—	GK	GER	Lennart Grill (to Union Berlin, previously on loan)
—	DF	GER	Sadik Fofana (on loan to Fortuna Sittard)

=== Eintracht Frankfurt ===
In:

No.	Pos.	Nation	Player
3	DF	ECU	Willian Pacho (from Royal Antwerp)
4	DF	GER	Robin Koch (on loan from Leeds United)
7	MF	EGY	Omar Marmoush (from VfL Wolfsburg)
8	MF	ALG	Farès Chaïbi (from Toulouse)
15	MF	TUN	Ellyes Skhiri (from 1. FC Köln)
16	MF	SWE	Hugo Larsson (from Malmö FF)
18	FW	GER	Jessic Ngankam (from Hertha BSC)
26	MF	FRA	Junior Dina Ebimbe (from Paris Saint-Germain, previously on loan)
29	DF	FRA	Niels Nkounkou (from Saint-Étienne)
32	DF	GER	Philipp Max (from PSV Eindhoven, previously on loan)
36	MF	GER	Ansgar Knauff (from Borussia Dortmund, previously on loan)
37	FW	GER	Ragnar Ache (loan return from Greuther Fürth)
44	DF	ECU	Davis Bautista (from Aucas)
49	MF	GER	Harpreet Ghotra (Promoted)

Out:

No.	Pos.	Nation	Player
2	DF	FRA	Evan Ndicka (to Roma)
8	MF	SUI	Djibril Sow (to Sevilla)
9	FW	FRA	Randal Kolo Muani (to Paris Saint-Germain)
11	MF	GER	Faride Alidou (on loan to 1. FC Köln)
15	MF	JPN	Daichi Kamada (to SS Lazio)
18	DF	MLI	Almamy Touré (Released)
19	FW	COL	Rafael Santos Borré (on loan to Werder Bremen)
25	DF	GER	Christopher Lenz (to RB Leipzig)
37	FW	GER	Ragnar Ache (to 1. FC Kaiserslautern)
39	DF	CMR	Jérôme Onguéné (on loan to Servette)
40	GK	GER	Diant Ramaj (to AFC Ajax)

=== VfL Wolfsburg ===
In:

No.	Pos.	Nation	Player
5	DF	SUI	Cédric Zesiger (from Young Boys)
7	MF	CZE	Václav Černý (from Twente)
9	FW	SWE	Amin Sarr (on loan from Lyon)
11	FW	POR	Tiago Tomás (from Sporting CP)
13	DF	BRA	Rogério (footballer, born 1998) (from Sassuolo)
18	DF	IRL	Anselmo García MacNulty (loan return from NAC Breda)
19	MF	CRO	Lovro Majer (from Rennes)
21	FW	POL	Bartosz Białek (loan return from Vitesse)
21	DF	DEN	Joakim Mæhle (from Atalanta)
25	DF	GER	Moritz Jenz (from Lorient)
49	DF	GER	Fabio Di Michele Sanchez (loan return from NAC Breda)
—	MF	USA	Bryang Kayo (loan return from 1. FC Nürnberg II)
—	MF	KOR	Hong Yun-sang (loan return from 1. FC Nürnberg II)

Out:

No.	Pos.	Nation	Player
5	DF	NED	Micky van de Ven (to Tottenham Hotspur)
7	FW	GER	Luca Waldschmidt (on loan to 1. FC Köln)
18	DF	IRL	Anselmo García MacNulty (to PEC Zwolle)
21	FW	POL	Bartosz Białek (on loan to Eupen)
22	MF	GER	Felix Nmecha (to Borussia Dortmund)
33	MF	EGY	Omar Marmoush (to Eintracht Frankfurt)
34	DF	CRO	Marin Pongračić (to Lecce, previously on loan)
39	MF	CRO	Bartol Franjić (on loan to SV Darmstadt 98)
39	DF	GER	Tim Siersleben (to 1. FC Heidenheim, previously on loan)
49	DF	ESP	Fabio Di Michele Sanchez (to 1. FC Saarbrücken)
—	MF	USA	Bryang Kayo (to Ingolstadt 04)
—	MF	KOR	Hong Yun-sang (to Pohang Steelers)
--	FW	GER	Maximilian Philipp (on loan to SC Freiburg, previously on loan at Werder Bremen)

=== Mainz 05 ===
In:

No.	Pos.	Nation	Player
2	DF	AUT	Phillipp Mwene (from PSV Eindhoven)
3	DF	NED	Sepp van den Berg (on loan from Liverpool)
10	FW	GER	Marco Richter (from Hertha BSC)
14	MF	GER	Tom Krauß (from RB Leipzig)
33	GK	GER	Daniel Batz (from 1. FC Saarbrücken)
—	DF	ANG	Anderson Lucoqui (loan return from Hansa Rostock)

Out:

No.	Pos.	Nation	Player
1	GK	GER	Finn Dahmen (to FC Augsburg)
3	DF	ESP	Aarón Martín (to Genoa)
6	MF	GER	Anton Stach (to 1899 Hoffenheim)
11	FW	DEN	Marcus Ingvartsen (to Nordsjælland)
36	FW	AUT	Marlon Mustapha (to Como)
—	DF	ANG	Anderson Lucoqui (to Hertha BSC)

=== Borussia Mönchengladbach ===
In:

No.	Pos.	Nation	Player
2	DF	ITA	Fabio Chiarodia (from Werder Bremen)
8	MF	GER	Julian Weigl (from Benfica, previously on loan)
9	FW	FRA	Franck Honorat (from Brest)
13	FW	USA	Jordan Pefok (on loan from Union Berlin)
25	FW	GER	Robin Hack (from Arminia Bielefeld)
28	FW	ARM	Grant-Leon Ranos (from Bayern Munich II)
31	FW	CZE	Tomáš Čvančara (from Sparta Prague)
39	DF	AUT	Maximilian Wöber (on loan from Leeds United)

Out:

No.	Pos.	Nation	Player
10	FW	FRA	Marcus Thuram (to Inter Milan)
23	MF	GER	Jonas Hofmann (to Bayer Leverkusen)
25	DF	ALG	Ramy Bensebaini (to Borussia Dortmund)
34	MF	IRL	Conor Noß (to Blau-Weiß Linz)
—	GK	GER	Jonas Kersken (on loan to Arminia Bielefeld)
—	DF	GER	Jordan Beyer (to Burnley, previously on loan)

=== 1. FC Köln ===
In:

No.	Pos.	Nation	Player
9	FW	GER	Luca Waldschmidt (on loan from VfL Wolfsburg)
12	GK	GER	Jonas Nickisch (from RB Leipzig)
17	DF	KOS	Leart Paqarada (from FC St. Pauli)
20	GK	GER	Philipp Pentke (from 1899 Hoffenheim)
22	MF	DEN	Jacob Steen Christensen (from Nordsjælland)
24	DF	GER	Jeff Chabot (from Sampdoria, previously on loan)
—	DF	GER	Dominique Heintz (from Union Berlin)
—	MF	GER	Faride Alidou (on loan from Eintracht Frankfurt)
—	DF	DEN	Rasmus Carstensen (on loan from Genk)

Out:

No.	Pos.	Nation	Player
1	GK	GER	Timo Horn (Released)
14	DF	GER	Jonas Hector (Retired)
25	FW	GER	Tim Lemperle (on loan to Greuther Fürth)
28	MF	TUN	Ellyes Skhiri (to Eintracht Frankfurt)
—	MF	SVK	Ondrej Duda (to Hellas Verona, previously on loan)
—	MF	GER	Marvin Obuz (on loan to Rot-Weiss Essen)

=== 1899 Hoffenheim ===
In:

No.	Pos.	Nation	Player
7	FW	GER	Mërgim Berisha (from FC Augsburg)
10	FW	NED	Wout Weghorst (on loan from Burnley)
11	MF	AUT	Florian Grillitsch (from Ajax)
14	FW	GER	Maximilian Beier (loan return from Hannover 96)
16	MF	GER	Anton Stach (from Mainz 05)
17	MF	GER	Julian Justvan (from SC Paderborn)
21	FW	GER	Marius Bülter (from Schalke 04)
41	DF	HUN	Attila Szalai (from Fenerbahçe)

Out:

No.	Pos.	Nation	Player
7	MF	DEN	Jacob Bruun Larsen (on loan to Burnley)
10	FW	ISR	Mu'nas Dabbur (to Shabab Al Ahli)
11	DF	ESP	Angeliño (loan return to RB Leipzig)
12	GK	GER	Philipp Pentke (to 1. FC Köln)
13	MF	GER	Angelo Stiller (to VfB Stuttgart)
14	MF	AUT	Christoph Baumgartner (to RB Leipzig)
16	MF	GER	Sebastian Rudy (Released)
17	MF	DEN	Thomas Delaney (loan return to Sevilla)
19	FW	DEN	Kasper Dolberg (loan return to Nice)
24	DF	USA	Justin Che (loan return to FC Dallas)
26	DF	POR	Eduardo Quaresma (loan return to Sporting CP)
35	MF	GER	Muhammed Damar (on loan to Hannover 96)
—	DF	AUT	Aleksandar Borković (to Sturm Graz, previously on loan)
—	DF	AUT	Stefan Posch (to Bologna, previously on loan)
—	DF	BRA	Lucas Ribeiro (to Ceará, previously on loan)

=== Werder Bremen ===
In:

No.	Pos.	Nation	Player
2	MF	BEL	Olivier Deman (from Cercle Brugge)
9	FW	POL	Dawid Kownacki (from Fortuna Düsseldorf)
14	MF	BEL	Senne Lynen (from Union SG)
18	MF	GUI	Naby Keïta (from Liverpool)
19	FW	COL	Rafael Santos Borré (on loan from Eintracht Frankfurt)
—	DF	GER	Daniel Ihendu (from RB Leipzig)
—	MF	USA	Ethan Kohler (from Oakland Roots)

Out:

No.	Pos.	Nation	Player
11	FW	GER	Niclas Füllkrug (to Borussia Dortmund)
17	FW	GER	Maximilian Philipp (loan return to VfL Wolfsburg)
21	FW	GER	Eren Dinkçi (on loan to 1. FC Heidenheim)
37	GK	GER	Mio Backhaus (on loan to Volendam)
39	DF	ITA	Fabio Chiarodia (to Borussia Mönchengladbach)
—	DF	GER	Dominik Becker (to 1. FC Saarbrücken, previously on loan)
—	DF	KOR	Park Kyu-hyun (to Dynamo Dresden, previously on loan)
—	MF	GER	Oscar Schönfelder (to Jahn Regensburg, previously on loan)
—	FW	GER	Abdenego Nankishi (on loan to Heracles Almelo)

=== VfL Bochum ===
In:

No.	Pos.	Nation	Player
13	MF	GER	Lukas Daschner (from FC St. Pauli)
15	DF	GER	Felix Passlack (from Borussia Dortmund)
19	MF	SVK	Matúš Bero (from Vitesse)
20	DF	UKR	Ivan Ordets (on loan from Dynamo Moscow)
27	MF	GER	Moritz Kwarteng (from 1. FC Magdeburg)
41	DF	SUI	Noah Loosli (from Grasshoppers)
—	DF	GER	Maximilian Wittek (from Vitesse)
—	DF	BRA	Bernardo (from Red Bull Salzburg)

Out:

No.	Pos.	Nation	Player
30	DF	GER	Dominique Heintz (loan return to Union Berlin)
34	GK	GER	Paul Grave (on loan to Wuppertaler SV)
—	DF	GER	Jannes Horn (to 1. FC Nürnberg, previously on loan)

=== FC Augsburg ===
In:

No.	Pos.	Nation	Player
1	GK	GER	Finn Dahmen (from Mainz 05)
5	DF	GHA	Patric Pfeiffer (from Darmstadt 98)
11	FW	GER	Mërgim Berisha (from Fenerbahçe, previously on loan)
14	MF	JPN	Masaya Okugawa (from Arminia Bielefeld)
18	MF	GER	Tim Breithaupt (from Karlsruher SC)
20	FW	GER	Sven Michel (from Union Berlin)
21	FW	GER	Phillip Tietz (from Darmstadt 98)
33	GK	GER	Marcel Lubik (promoted)
—	MF	ALB	Tim Civeja (loan return from FC Ingolstadt)
—	FW	GER	Lucas Ehrlich (from Dynamo Dresden)
—	FW	USA	Ricardo Pepi (loan return from Groningen)

Out:

No.	Pos.	Nation	Player
11	FW	GER	Mërgim Berisha (to 1899 Hoffenheim)
25	GK	GER	Daniel Klein (on loan to SV Sandhausen)
—	MF	ALB	Tim Civeja (to 1. FC Saarbrücken)
—	MF	GER	Lasse Günther (on loan to Wehen Wiesbaden)
—	MF	GER	Henri Koudossou (on loan to ADO Den Haag)
—	FW	USA	Ricardo Pepi (to PSV)

=== VfB Stuttgart ===
In:

No.	Pos.	Nation	Player
6	MF	GER	Angelo Stiller (from 1899 Hoffenheim)
7	DF	GER	Maximilian Mittelstädt (from Hertha BSC)
9	FW	GUI	Serhou Guirassy (from Rennes, previously on loan)
10	MF	KOR	Jeong Woo-yeong (from SC Freiburg)
18	MF	GER	Jamie Leweling (on loan from Union Berlin)
19	FW	SRB	Jovan Milošević (from Vojvodina)
20	DF	SUI	Leonidas Stergiou (on loan from St. Gallen)
29	DF	FRA	Anthony Rouault (on loan from Toulouse)
33	GK	GER	Alexander Nübel (on loan from Bayern Munich)
—	DF	CRO	Matej Maglica (from St. Gallen)

Out:

No.	Pos.	Nation	Player
1	GK	GER	Florian Müller (to SC Freiburg)
3	MF	JPN	Wataru Endō (to Liverpool)
5	DF	GRE	Konstantinos Mavropanos (to West Ham)
10	FW	POR	Tiago Tomás (loan return to Sporting CP)
20	FW	GER	Luca Pfeiffer (on loan to Darmstadt 98)
24	DF	CRO	Borna Sosa (to Ajax)
27	FW	AUS	Alou Kuol (to Central Coast Mariners)
—	DF	CRO	Matej Maglica (on loan to Darmstadt 98)
—	FW	DEN	Wahid Faghir (on loan to SV Elversberg)

=== 1. FC Heidenheim ===
In:

No.	Pos.	Nation	Player
4	DF	GER	Tim Siersleben (from VfL Wolfsburg, previously on loan)
5	MF	GER	Benedikt Gimber (from Jahn Regensburg)
8	FW	GER	Eren Dinkçi (on loan from Werder Bremen)
18	FW	GER	Marvin Pieringer (from Schalke 04)
20	FW	AUT	Nikola Dovedan (from Austria Wien)
23	DF	GER	Omar Haktab Traoré (from VfL Osnabrück)
36	MF	GER	Luka Janeš (Promoted)

Out:

No.	Pos.	Nation	Player
8	MF	GER	Andreas Geipl (Released)
18	DF	GER	Marvin Rittmüller (to Eintracht Braunschweig)
20	MF	GER	Dženis Burnić (to Karlsruher SC)
23	MF	GER	Merveille Biankadi (Released)
31	MF	GER	Mert Arslan (Released)

=== Darmstadt 98 ===
In:

No.	Pos.	Nation	Player
5	DF	CRO	Matej Maglica (on loan from VfB Stuttgart)
14	DF	AUT	Christoph Klarer (from Fortuna Düsseldorf)
15	MF	GER	Fabian Nürnberger (from 1. FC Nürnberg)
16	MF	GER	Andreas Müller (from 1. FC Magdeburg)
24	FW	GER	Luca Pfeiffer (on loan from VfB Stuttgart)
27	MF	GER	Tim Skarke (on loan from Union Berlin)
28	MF	CRO	Bartol Franjić (on loan from VfL Wolfsburg)
39	FW	SCO	Fraser Hornby (from Reims)

Out:

No.	Pos.	Nation	Player
5	DF	GHA	Patric Pfeiffer (to FC Augsburg)
9	FW	GER	Phillip Tietz (to FC Augsburg)
14	MF	DEN	Magnus Warming (loan return to Torino)
16	FW	ENG	Keanan Bennetts (to Wehen Wiesbaden)
21	GK	GER	Steve Kroll (Released)
28	MF	FRA	Yassin Ben Balla (Released)
35	MF	SLE	John Peter Sesay (on loan to Union Titus Pétange)
—	MF	GER	Philipp Sonn (Released)
—	FW	GER	André Leipold (to SV Lafnitz)

== 2. Bundesliga ==
=== Schalke 04 ===
In:

No.	Pos.	Nation	Player
7	MF	GER	Paul Seguin (from Union Berlin)
10	MF	GER	Lino Tempelmann (from SC Freiburg)
—	FW	GER	Marvin Pieringer (loan return from Paderborn 07)

Out:

No.	Pos.	Nation	Player
4	DF	JPN	Maya Yoshida (released)
5	DF	NED	Sepp van den Berg (loan return to Liverpool)
6	MF	GER	Tom Krauß (loan return to RB Leipzig)
11	FW	GER	Marius Bülter (to 1899 Hoffenheim)
13	GK	GER	Alexander Schwolow (loan return to Hertha BSC)
18	DF	FIN	Jere Uronen (loan return to Brest)
20	MF	GER	Tim Skarke (loan return to 1. FC Union Berlin)
25	DF	GER	Moritz Jenz (loan return to Lorient)
26	FW	SUI	Michael Frey (loan return to Antwerp)
30	MF	CZE	Alex Král (loan return to Spartak Moscow)
33	MF	COL	Éder Álvarez Balanta (loan return to Club Brugge)
—	MF	GER	Can Bozdoğan (to Utrecht, previously on loan)
—	MF	GER	Sidi Sané (to Eintracht Braunschweig)
—	FW	GER	Marvin Pieringer (to 1. FC Heidenheim)

=== Hertha BSC ===
In:

No.	Pos.	Nation	Player
19	MF	TUN	Jeremy Dudziak (from Greuther Fürth)
21	DF	ANG	Anderson Lucoqui (from Mainz 05)
32	GK	GER	Alexander Schwolow (loan return from Schalke 04)
35	GK	GER	Marius Gersbeck (from Karlsruher SC)
37	DF	GER	Toni Leistner (from Sint-Truiden)
44	DF	GER	Linus Gechter (loan return from Eintracht Braunschweig)
—	MF	HUN	Palkó Dárdai (from Fehérvár)
—	FW	POL	Krzysztof Piątek (loan return from Salernitana)
—	FW	BIH	Smail Prevljak (from Eupen)

Out:

No.	Pos.	Nation	Player
6	MF	TUR	Tolga Ciğerci (to MKE Ankaragücü)
10	MF	NED	Jean-Paul Boëtius (Released)
17	DF	GER	Maximilian Mittelstädt (to VfB Stuttgart)
19	FW	MNE	Stevan Jovetić (Released)
23	FW	GER	Marco Richter (to Mainz 05)
24	FW	GER	Jessic Ngankam (to Eintracht Frankfurt)
29	MF	FRA	Lucas Tousart (to Union Berlin)
32	GK	GER	Alexander Schwolow (Released)
40	MF	NGA	Chidera Ejuke (loan return to CSKA Moscow)
—	DF	PAR	Omar Alderete (to Getafe, previously on loan)
—	MF	ARG	Santiago Ascacíbar (to Estudiantes (LP), previously on loan)
—	FW	POL	Krzysztof Piątek (to İstanbul Başakşehir)

=== Hamburger SV ===
In:

No.	Pos.	Nation	Player
10	MF	NED	Immanuel Pherai (from Eintracht Braunschweig)
21	MF	GER	Levin Öztunalı (from Union Berlin)

Out:

No.	Pos.	Nation	Player

=== Fortuna Düsseldorf ===
In:

No.	Pos.	Nation	Player
1	GK	POL	Karol Niemczycki (from Cracovia)
6	MF	GER	Yannik Engelhardt (from SC Freiburg)
9	FW	NED	Vincent Vermeij (from SC Freiburg)
20	DF	GER	Jamil Siebert (loan return from Viktoria Köln)
—	FW	GER	Nicklas Shipnoski (loan return from Jahn Regensburg)

Out:

No.	Pos.	Nation	Player
1	GK	GER	Raphael Wolf (Released)
5	DF	AUT	Christoph Klarer (to Darmstadt 98)
7	MF	SWE	Kristoffer Peterson (to Hapoel Be'er Sheva)
8	DF	POL	Michał Karbownik (loan return to Brighton & Hove Albion)
9	FW	POL	Dawid Kownacki (to Werder Bremen)
14	FW	GER	Kwadwo Baah (loan return to Watford)
28	FW	GER	Rouwen Hennings (Released)
—	FW	GER	Nicklas Shipnoski (to Arminia Bielefeld)

=== FC St. Pauli ===
In:

No.	Pos.	Nation	Player
15	MF	LUX	Danel Sinani (from Norwich City)

Out:

No.	Pos.	Nation	Player
13	MF	GER	Lukas Daschner (to VfL Bochum)
23	DF	KOS	Leart Paqarada (to 1. FC Köln)
32	DF	GER	Jannes Wieckhoff (to Heracles Almelo)

=== SC Paderborn ===
In:

No.	Pos.	Nation	Player
19	DF	GER	Kimberly Ezekwem (on loan from SC Freiburg)

Out:

No.	Pos.	Nation	Player
10	MF	GER	Julian Justvan (to 1899 Hoffenheim)
17	GK	GER	Leopold Zingerle (to RB Leipzig)
—	FW	GER	Marvin Pieringer (loan return to Schalke 04)

=== Karlsruher SC ===
In:

No.	Pos.	Nation	Player
15	MF	GER	Dženis Burnić (from 1. FC Heidenheim)

Out:

No.	Pos.	Nation	Player
—	GK	GER	Marius Gersbeck (to Hertha BSC)
—	MF	GER	Tim Breithaupt (to FC Augsburg)
—	FW	DEN	Mikkel Kaufmann (loan return to Copenhagen)

=== Holstein Kiel ===
In:

No.	Pos.	Nation	Player

Out:

No.	Pos.	Nation	Player

=== 1. FC Kaiserslautern ===
In:

No.	Pos.	Nation	Player
9	FW	GER	Ragnar Ache (from Eintracht Frankfurt)
15	DF	POL	Tymoteusz Puchacz (on loan from Union Berlin)

Out:

No.	Pos.	Nation	Player

=== Hannover 96 ===
In:

No.	Pos.	Nation	Player
4	DF	GER	Bright Arrey-Mbi (from Bayern Munich, previously on loan)
13	MF	GER	Max Christiansen (from Greuther Fürth)
17	MF	GER	Muhammed Damar (on loan from 1899 Hoffenheim)
23	DF	GER	Marcel Halstenberg (from RB Leipzig)
32	FW	GER	Andreas Voglsammer (from Millwall)
35	GK	GER	Leon-Oumar Wechsel (from SV Rödinghausen)
37	DF	GER	Brooklyn Ezeh (from Wehen Wiesbaden)
39	MF	GER	Marius Wörl (from 1860 Munich)
40	MF	GER	Christopher Scott (on loan from Antwerp)

Out:

No.	Pos.	Nation	Player
3	DF	GER	Ekin Çelebi (to Rot-Weiss Essen)
9	FW	GER	Hendrik Weydandt (retired)
14	FW	GER	Maximilian Beier (loan return to 1899 Hoffenheim)
22	FW	GER	Sebastian Stolze (to SV Sandhausen)
27	MF	GER	Tim Walbrecht (free agent)
32	DF	SVN	Luka Krajnc (to Catanzaro)
37	MF	GER	Sebastian Kerk (to Widzew Łódź)
39	MF	GER	Marius Wörl (on loan to Arminia Bielefeld)
—	FW	GER	Lawrence Ennali (to Górnik Zabrze, previously on loan at Rot-Weiss Essen)
—	MF	GER	Simon Stehle (to 1. FC Saarbrücken, previously on loan at Viktoria Köln)

=== 1. FC Magdeburg ===
In:

No.	Pos.	Nation	Player
3	DF	KOS	Andi Hoti (from Inter Milan)
42	GK	GER	Julian Pollersbeck (from Lyon)

Out:

No.	Pos.	Nation	Player
8	MF	GER	Moritz Kwarteng (to VfL Bochum)
16	MF	GER	Andreas Müller (to Darmstadt 98)
28	GK	GER	Tim Boss (to SV Elversberg)

=== Greuther Fürth ===
In:

No.	Pos.	Nation	Player
16	FW	GER	Tim Lemperle (on loan from 1. FC Köln)
22	MF	GER	Robert Wagner (on loan from SC Freiburg)
—	MF	TUN	Jeremy Dudziak (loan return from Hatayspor)

Out:

No.	Pos.	Nation	Player
13	MF	GER	Max Christiansen (to Hannover 96)
22	MF	GER	Sebastian Griesbeck (to Eintracht Braunschweig)
39	FW	GER	Ragnar Ache (loan return to Eintracht Frankfurt)
—	MF	TUN	Jeremy Dudziak (to Hertha BSC)

=== Hansa Rostock ===
In:

No.	Pos.	Nation	Player

Out:

No.	Pos.	Nation	Player
—	DF	ANG	Anderson Lucoqui (loan return to Mainz 05)
—	DF	NED	Rick van Drongelen (loan return to Union Berlin)

=== 1. FC Nürnberg ===
In:

No.	Pos.	Nation	Player
38	DF	GER	Jannes Horn (from VfL Bochum, previously on loan)
—	FW	GER	Manuel Wintzheimer (loan return from Eintracht Braunschweig)

Out:

No.	Pos.	Nation	Player
15	MF	GER	Fabian Nürnberger (to Darmstadt 98)
24	MF	COL	Gustavo Puerta (loan return to Bayer Leverkusen)

=== Eintracht Braunschweig ===
In:

No.	Pos.	Nation	Player
5	DF	FIN	Robert Ivanov (from Warta Poznań)
8	MF	JPN	Keita Endo (on loan from Union Berlin)
9	FW	FRA	Rayan Philippe (from Swift Hesperange)
12	GK	AUT	Tino Casali (from Rheindorf Altach)
17	MF	IRQ	Youssef Amyn (from Feyenoord)
18	DF	GER	Marvin Rittmüller (from 1. FC Heidenheim)
24	MF	GER	Sidi Sané (from Schalke 04)
33	MF	GER	Sebastian Griesbeck (from Greuther Fürth)
34	GK	GER	Justin Duda (Promoted)
36	FW	GER	Kaan Caliskaner (from Jahn Regensburg)
44	MF	USA	Johan Gomez (from FSV Zwickau)

Out:

No.	Pos.	Nation	Player
5	DF	GER	Philipp Strompf (Released)
6	MF	GER	Bryan Henning (to Viktoria Köln)
8	MF	GER	Mehmet Ibrahimi (loan return to RB Leipzig)
10	MF	NED	Immanuel Pherai (to Hamburger SV)
15	DF	BEL	Nathan de Medina (Released)
16	GK	BIH	Jasmin Fejzić (Retired)
18	DF	CRO	Filip Benković (loan return to Udinese)
20	FW	GER	Lion Lauberbach (to KV Mechelen)
22	MF	VEN	Enrique Peña Zauner (Released)
44	DF	GER	Linus Gechter (loan return to Hertha BSC)
—	FW	GER	Tarsis Bonga (Released)
—	FW	GER	Manuel Wintzheimer (loan return to 1. FC Nürnberg)

=== SV Elversberg ===
In:

No.	Pos.	Nation	Player
9	FW	GER	Dominik Martinović (from Waldhof Mannheim)
17	MF	GER	Paul Wanner (on loan from Bayern Munich)
22	MF	GER	Joseph Boyamba (from 1860 Munich)
26	DF	GER	Arne Sicker (from SV Sandhausen)
28	GK	GER	Tim Boss (from 1. FC Magdeburg)
29	FW	DEN	Wahid Faghir (on loan from VfB Stuttgart)

Out:

No.	Pos.	Nation	Player
21	MF	GER	Eros Dacaj (to SV Rödinghausen)
32	MF	GER	Daniel Pantschenko (on loan to Union Titus Pétange)
—	DF	GER	Tobias Mißner (Released)

=== VfL Osnabrück ===
In:

No.	Pos.	Nation	Player
—	GK	GER	Lennart Grill (on loan from Union Berlin)

Out:

No.	Pos.	Nation	Player
—	DF	GER	Omar Haktab Traoré (to 1. FC Heidenheim)

=== Wehen Wiesbaden ===
In:

No.	Pos.	Nation	Player
11	FW	ENG	Keanan Bennetts (from Darmstadt 98)
29	MF	GER	Lasse Günther (on loan from FC Augsburg)

Out:

No.	Pos.	Nation	Player
21	FW	GER	Benedict Hollerbach (to 1. FC Union Berlin)
37	DF	GER	Brooklyn Ezeh (to Hannover 96)

== See also ==
- 2023–24 Bundesliga
- 2023–24 2. Bundesliga
