= 2021–22 SV Darmstadt 98 season =

SV Darmstadt 98
2021–22 season
- Chairman: Klaus Rüdiger Fritsch
- Manager: Torsten Lieberknecht
- Stadium: Merck-Stadion am Böllenfalltor
- 2. Bundesliga: 4th
- DFB-Pokal: First round
- Top goalscorer: League: Luca Pfeiffer (17); All: Luca Pfeiffer (18)
Home colours	Away colours

The 2021–22 season was SV Darmstadt 98's 124th season in existence and the club's fifth consecutive season and 22nd season overall in the 2. Bundesliga, the second tier of German football. The club also participated in the DFB-Pokal.

== Background and pre-season ==
Darmstadt 98 finished the 2020–21 season in 7th place, 11 points below the automatic promotion places and 13 points below the promotion play-off place. Manager Markus Anfang left the club at the end of the previous season and was replaced by Torsten Lieberknecht in June 2021.

=== Pre-season ===
Pre-season match details
Date	Time	Opponent	Venue	Result F–A	Scorers	Attendance	Ref.

== Competitions ==
=== 2. Bundesliga ===
==== League table ====
Pos	Team	Pld	W	D	L	GF	GA	GD	Pts	Promotion, qualification or relegation
2	Werder Bremen (P)	34	18	9	7	65	43	+22	63	Promotion to Bundesliga
3	Hamburger SV	34	16	12	6	67	35	+32	60	Qualification for promotion play-offs
4	Darmstadt 98	34	18	6	10	71	46	+25	60	
5	FC St. Pauli	34	16	9	9	61	46	+15	57	
6	1. FC Heidenheim	34	15	7	12	43	45	−2	52	

Source: DFB
Rules for classification: 1) Points; 2) Goal difference; 3) Goals scored; 4) Head-to-head points; 5) Head-to-head goal difference; 6) Head-to-head away goals scored; 7) Away goals scored; 8) Play-off.
(P) Promoted

==== Matches ====
2. Bundesliga match details
Match	Date	Time	Opponent	Venue	Result F–A	Scorers	Attendance	League position	Ref.
1	24 July 2021	13:30	Jahn Regensburg	Home	0–2	—	4,500	15th	
2	30 July 2021	18:30	Karlsruher SC	Away	0–3	—	9,750	16th	
3	15 August 2021	13:30	FC Ingolstadt	Home	6–1	Tietz 29', 45+4', L. Pfeiffer 39', 66', Schnellhardt 45+2', Manu 90+4'	4,506	12th	
4	22 August 2021	13:30	Hamburger SV	Away	2–2	Tietz 14' (pen.), 45+4'	17,950	10th	
5	28 August 2021	13:30	Hannover 96	Home	4–0	L. Pfeiffer 21', Tietz 45+1', Schnellhardt 70', Krajnc 87' (o.g.)	6,050	8th	
6	12 September 2021	13:30	Hansa Rostock	Away	1–2	Kempe 66' (pen.)	14,500	11th	
7	19 September 2021	13:30	Dynamo Dresden	Home	1–0	Kempe 14'	7,020	9th	
8	24 September 2021	18:30	1. FC Heidenheim	Away	1–2	Tietz 52'	5,095	12th	
9	3 October 2021	13:30	SV Sandhausen	Home	6–1	Tietz 2', 59', L. Pfeiffer 35', 57', Goller 47', Karić 73'	4,457	9th	
10	17 October 2021	13:30	Werder Bremen	Home	3–0	Holland 45', L. Pfeiffer 65', 71'	13,000	6th	
11	23 October 2021	13:30	Holstein Kiel	Away	1–1	L. Pfeiffer 41'	7,009	7th	
12	29 October 2021	18:30	1. FC Nürnberg	Home	2–0	L. Pfeiffer 11', Schindler 59' (o.g.)	13,000	6th	
13	7 November 2021	13:30	Schalke 04	Away	4–2	Tietz 11', 63', Honsak 23', Goller 89'	51,327	4th	
14	20 November 2021	13:30	FC St. Pauli	Home	4–0	Tietz 6', Manu 29', L. Pfeiffer 39', 41'	13,000	2nd	
15	27 November 2021	13:30	Erzgebirge Aue	Away	2–1	L. Pfeiffer 62', Seydel 75'	0 (Note: Match played behind closed doors)	2nd	
16	3 December 2021	18:30	Fortuna Düsseldorf	Home	1–3	Tietz 85' pen.	12,450	2nd	
17	11 December 2021	13:30	SC Paderborn	Away	1–0	P. Pfeiffer 81'	2,924	2nd	
18	19 December 2021	13:30	Jahn Regensburg	Away	2–0	Karić 70', Kempe 90+3'	0 (Note: Match played behind closed doors)	2nd	
19	15 January 2022	20:30	Karlsruher SC	Home	2–2	Gjasula 48', Holland 51'	250	2nd	
20	22 January 2022	13:30	FC Ingolstadt	Away	2–0	Skarke 15', Seydel 82'	0 (Note: Match played behind closed doors)	1st	
21	6 February 2022	13:30	Hamburger SV	Home	0–5		1,000	1st	
22	13 February 2022	13:30	Hannover 96	Away	2–2	Stolze 18' o.g., Seydel 61'	3,800	4th	
23	20 February 2022	13:30	Hansa Rostock	Home	1–1	Kempe 24'	7,500	3rd	
24	26 February 2022	20:30	Dynamo Dresden	Away	1–0	Honsak 90+3'	10,024	2nd	
25	4 March 2022	18:30	1. FC Heidenheim	Home	3–2	Seydel 77', Tietz 81', Skarke 83'	11,296	2nd	
26	11 March 2022	18:30	SV Sandhausen	Home	1–1	Seydel 17'	11,300	1st	
27	19 March 2022	20:30	Werder Bremen	Away	0–1		41,000	3rd	
28	2 April 2022	13:30	Holstein Kiel	Home	3–1	Bader 11', Seydel 45', Manu 50'	13,400	2nd	
29	9 April 2022	20:30	1. FC Nürnberg	Away	1–3	L. Pfeiffer 58'	30,471	4th	
30	17 April 2022	13:30	Schalke 04	Home	2–5	Tietz 11', 34'	14,500	4th	
31	23 April 2022	20:30	FC St. Pauli	Away	2–1	L. Pfeiffer 9', Holland 35'	29,546	3rd	
32	30 April 2022	20:30	Erzgebirge Aue	Home	6–0	L. Pfeiffer 16', Skarke 18', 39', Manu 19', Honsak 74', Kempe 90'	13,850	2nd	
33	6 May 2022	18:30	Fortuna Düsseldorf	Away	1–2	Kempe 60' pen.	31,622	4th	
34	15 May 2022	15:30	SC Paderborn	Home	3–0	Skarke 2', L. Pfeiffer 25', 38'	13,710	4th	

=== DFB-Pokal ===
DFB-Pokal match details
Round	Date	Time	Opponent	Venue	Result F–A	Scorers	Attendance	Ref.
First round	6 August 2021	20:45	1860 Munich	Away	1–1 (3–4 p)	Pfeiffer 80'	4,158	

== Transfers ==
=== Transfers in ===
Date	Position	Name	From	Fee	Ref.

=== Loans in ===
Date	Position	Name	Club	Return	Ref.

=== Transfers out ===
Date	Position	Name	To	Fee	Ref.

=== Loans out ===
Date	Position	Name	Club	Return	Ref.

== Appearances and goals ==
Numbers in parentheses denote appearances as substitute.
Players with names struck through and marked † left the club during the playing season.
Players with names in italics and marked * were on loan from another club for the whole of their season with Darmstadt.
Key to positions: GK – Goalkeeper; DF – Defender; MF – Midfielder; FW – Forward

Players included in matchday squads
No.	Pos.	Nat.	Name	2. Bundesliga		DFB-Pokal		Total	
No.	Pos.	Nat.	Name	Apps	Goals	Apps	Goals	Apps	Goals
7	MF	GER	Benjamin Goller *	2	0	0	0	2	0
8	MF	GER	Fabian Schnellhardt	2	0	0	0	2	0
9	FW	GER	Phillip Tietz	2	0	0	0	2	0
13	GK	GER	Morten Behrens	2	0	0	0	2	0
16	FW	GER	Luca Pfeiffer *	0 (1)	0	0	0	0 (1)	0
18	MF	AUT	Mathias Honsak	1	0	0	0	1	0
19	DF	AUT	Emir Karic	2	0	0	0	2	0
20	DF	GER	Jannik Müller	2	0	0	0	2	0
24	DF	GER	Lasse Sobiech	2	0	0	0	2	0
26	DF	GER	Matthias Bader	2	0	0	0	2	0
30	MF	POL	Adrian Stanilewicz	1	0	0	0	1	0
32	DF	GER	Fabian Holland	2	0	0	0	2	0
35	MF	SLE	John Peter Sesay	0 (2)	0	0	0	0 (2)	0
38	DF	GER	Clemens Riedel	1 (1)	0	0	0	1 (1)	0
40	FW	GER	Erich Berko	1	0	0	0	1	0
41	MF	GER	Philipp Sonn	0 (1)	0	0	0	0 (1)	0
43	MF	AUT	Nemanja Celic	0 (1)	0	0	0	0 (1)	0

Players not included in matchday squads
No.	Pos.	Nat.	Name
1	GK	GER	Marcel Schuhen
3	DF	SWE	Thomas Isherwood
5	DF	GER	Patric Pfeiffer
6	MF	GER	Marvin Mehlem
11	MF	GER	Tobias Kempe
17	DF	GER	Frank Ronstadt
21	GK	GER	Steve Kroll
22	FW	GER	Aaron Seydel
27	MF	GER	Tim Skarke
33	MF	GER	Braydon Manu
34	MF	GER	Leon Müller
37	GK	GER	Antonis Makatounakis
39	FW	GER	Ensar Arslan
