= 2023–24 FC Augsburg season =

FC Augsburg
2023–24 season
- Chairman: Klaus Hofmann
- Head coach: Enrico Maaßen (until 9 October); Jess Thorup (from 15 October)
- Stadium: WWK Arena
- Bundesliga: 11th
- DFB-Pokal: First round
- Top goalscorer: League: Ermedin Demirović (15); All: Ermedin Demirović (15)
- Average home league attendance: 29,144
Home colours	Away colours

The 2023–24 season was FC Augsburg's 117th season in existence and 13th consecutive season in the Bundesliga. They also competed in the DFB-Pokal.

== Players ==
=== First-team squad ===
As of 1 February 2024

Note: Flags indicate national team as defined under FIFA eligibility rules; some limited exceptions apply. Players may hold more than one non-FIFA nationality.

No.	Pos.	Nation	Player
1	GK	GER	Finn Dahmen
2	DF	POL	Robert Gumny
3	DF	DEN	Mads Valentin
4	MF	ENG	Reece Oxford
5	DF	GHA	Patric Pfeiffer
6	DF	NED	Jeffrey Gouweleeuw (captain)
7	FW	CRO	Dion Drena Beljo
8	MF	KOS	Elvis Rexhbeçaj
9	FW	BIH	Ermedin Demirović
10	MF	GER	Arne Maier
11	MF	ESP	Pep Biel (on loan from Olympiacos)
16	MF	SUI	Ruben Vargas
17	MF	CRO	Kristijan Jakić (on loan from Eintracht Frankfurt)
18	MF	GER	Tim Breithaupt

No.	Pos.	Nation	Player
19	DF	GER	Felix Uduokhai
20	FW	GER	Sven Michel
21	FW	GER	Phillip Tietz
22	DF	BRA	Iago
23	DF	GER	Maximilian Bauer
24	MF	FIN	Fredrik Jensen
27	MF	BEL	Arne Engels
30	MF	GER	Niklas Dorsch
32	DF	GER	Raphael Framberger
33	GK	POL	Marcel Łubik
36	MF	GER	Mert Kömür
40	GK	CZE	Tomáš Koubek
43	DF	SUI	Kevin Mbabu (on loan from Fulham)

=== Out on loan ===
Note: Flags indicate national team as defined under FIFA eligibility rules; some limited exceptions apply. Players may hold more than one non-FIFA nationality.

No.	Pos.	Nation	Player
—	FW	FRA	Irvin Cardona (at AS Saint-Étienne until 30 June 2024)
—	DF	CRO	David Čolina (at Vejle BK until 30 June 2024)
—	GK	GER	Daniel Klein (at SV Sandhausen until 30 June 2024)
—	MF	GER	Henri Koudossou (at ADO Den Haag until 30 June 2024)
—	FW	GER	Lasse Günther (at SV Wehen Wiesbaden until 30 June 2024)

No.	Pos.	Nation	Player
—	FW	FRA	Nathanaël Mbuku (at AS Saint-Étienne until 30 June 2024)
—	MF	JPN	Masaya Okugawa (at Hamburger SV until 30 June 2024)
—	FW	GER	Lukas Petkov (at Greuther Fürth until 30 June 2024)
—	DF	DEN	Frederik Winther (at Estoril until 30 June 2024)

== Transfers ==
=== In ===
Pos.	Player	Transferred from	Fee	Date	Source
MF	(Germany) Tim Breithaupt	(Germany) Karlsruher SC	€2,500,000	1 July 2023	
GK	(Germany) Finn Dahmen	(Germany) Mainz 05	Free	1 July 2023	
FW	(Germany) Sven Michel	(Germany) Union Berlin	€950,000	1 July 2023	
DF	(Ghana) Patric Pfeiffer	(Germany) Darmstadt 98	Free	1 July 2023	
FW	(Germany) Mërgim Berisha	(Turkey) Fenerbahçe	€4,000,000	2 July 2023	
MF	(Japan) Masaya Okugawa	(Germany) Arminia Bielefeld	Free	5 July 2023	
FW	(Germany) Phillip Tietz	(Germany) Darmstadt 98	€2,200,000	12 July 2023	
DF	(Switzerland) Kevin Mbabu	(England) Fulham	Loan	1 September 2023	
DF	(England) Japhet Tanganga	(England) Tottenham Hotspur	Loan	1 September 2023	
MF	(Croatia) Kristijan Jakić	(Germany) Eintracht Frankfurt	Loan	19 January 2024	
MF	(Spain) Pep Biel	(Greece) Olympiacos	Loan	1 February 2024	

=== Out ===
Pos.	Player	Transferred to	Fee	Date	Source
MF	(Germany) Daniel Caligiuri		Free	1 July 2023	
GK	(Poland) Rafał Gikiewicz	(Turkey) Ankaragücü	Free	1 July 2023	
MF	(Germany) Felix Götze	(Germany) Rot-Weiss Essen	€100,000	1 July 2023	
FW	(Germany) André Hahn		Free	1 July 2023	
GK	(Germany) Daniel Klein	(Germany) SV Sandhausen	Loan	1 July 2023	
GK	(Germany) Benjamin Leneis	(Germany) FSV Zwickau	Free	1 July 2023	
DF	(Germany) Tobias Strobl	Retired		1 July 2023	
MF	(Albania) Tim Civeja	(Germany) 1. FC Saarbrücken	Undisclosed	4 July 2023	
FW	(United States) Ricardo Pepi	(Netherlands) PSV	€11,000,000	7 July 2023	
MF	(Germany) Henri Koudossou	(Netherlands) ADO Den Haag	Loan	18 July 2023	
MF	(Austria) Julian Baumgartlinger	Retired		24 July 2023	
FW	(Germany) Lasse Günther	(Germany) Wehen Wiesbaden	Loan	25 July 2023	
FW	(Germany) Maurice Malone	(Switzerland) Basel	€2,000,000	11 August 2023	
FW	(Germany) Mërgim Berisha	(Germany) 1899 Hoffenheim	€14,000,000	30 August 2023	
FW	(Germany) Noah Sarenren Bazee	(Germany) Arminia Bielefeld	Undisclosed	31 August 2023	
DF	(Croatia) Jozo Stanić	(Switzerland) St. Gallen	Undisclosed	2 September 2023	
FW	(France) Irvin Cardona	(France) AS Saint-Étienne	Loan	3 January 2024	
DF	(Germany) Aaron Zehnter	(Germany) SC Paderborn	Undisclosed	5 January 2024	
MF	(Japan) Masaya Okugawa	(Germany) Hamburger SV	Loan	14 January 2024	
FW	(France) Nathanaël Mbuku	(France) AS Saint-Étienne	Loan	21 January 2024	
DF	(Croatia) David Čolina	(Denmark) Vejle BK	Loan	24 January 2024	
DF	(Denmark) Frederik Winther	(Portugal) Estoril	Loan	29 January 2024	

== Pre-season and friendlies ==
Win Draw Loss Fixtures

11 July 2023 Friendly	Beşiktaş	1–1	FC Augsburg	Kufstein, Austria
15:00 CEST (UTC+2)	Muleka 42'	Report	Cardona 59'	Stadium: Kufstein-Arena; Referee: Alan Kijas (Austria)
Note: The match was ended at the 77th minute because Beşiktaş fans threw objects onto the field.

18 July 2023 Friendly	Kufstein	0–9	FC Augsburg	Schladming, Austria
18:30 CEST (UTC+2)		Report	Winther 5'; Michel 23'; Vargas 28'; Malone 50', 57'; Kömür 61'; Cardona 65', 80', 90'	Stadium: Hohenhaus Tenne Area Schladming

22 July 2023 Friendly	PSV Eindhoven	2–1	FC Augsburg	Schladming, Austria
15:00 CEST (UTC+2)	De Jong 19'; Kwaaitaal 107'	Report	Beljo 15'; Demirović (penalty missed) 123'	Stadium: WM Estriche Area Schladming
Note: Match was played in two 75-minute periods.

29 July 2023 Friendly	FC Augsburg	3–2	Jahn Regensburg	Augsburg
11:00 CEST (UTC+2)				Stadium: FCA-Trainingsgelände

29 July 2023 Friendly	FC Augsburg	3–1	Ajax	Augsburg
15:00 CEST (UTC+2)	Rulli 42' (o.g.); Michel 69', 76' (pen.)		Brobbey 56' (pen.)	Stadium: WWK Arena

5 August 2023 Trofeo Angelo Iervolino	Salernitana	2–1	FC Augsburg	Salerno
20:30 CEST (UTC+2)	Coulibaly 59'; Botheim 73'		Tietz 53' (pen.)	Stadium: Stadio Arechi; Attendance: 3,064; Referee: Fabio Maresca (Italia)

6 August 2023 Friendly	Napoli	1–0	FC Augsburg	Castel di Sangro, Italy
18:30 CEST (UTC+2)	Rrahmani 61'	Report		Stadium: Stadio Teofilo Patini; Attendance: 6,000; Referee: Ruben Alberto Arena (Italy)

7 September 2023 Friendly	FC Augsburg	2–1	Greuther Fürth	Augsburg
14:00 CEST (UTC+2)	Tietz 51'; Jensen 54'	Report	Abiama 16'	Stadium: WWK ARENA - Trainingsplatz

12 October 2023 Friendly	FC Augsburg	Cancelled	1. FC Nürnberg
14:00 CEST (UTC+2)

16 November 2023 Friendly	FC Augsburg	5–2	Jahn Regensburg
14:00 CET (UTC+1)	Beljo 1', 22' (pen.), 51'; Michel 40'; Hausmann 82'	Report	Bauer 13'; Schmidt 38'	Attendance: 0

6 January 2024 Friendly	FC Augsburg	1–0	1899 Hoffenheim	Augsburg
13:00 CET (UTC+1)	Jensen 2'; Uduokhai (yellow card) 60'	Report		Stadium: WWK Arena; Attendance: 580

22 March 2024 Friendly	FC Augsburg	4–1	Greuther Fürth	Augsburg
14:00 CET (UTC+1)	Uduokhai 25'; Pedersen 56'; Maier 76'; Biel 89'	Report	Srbeny 85' (pen.)	Stadium: WWK Arena

== Competitions ==
=== Overall record ===
Competition	First match	Last match	Starting round	Final position	Record							
Competition	First match	Last match	Starting round	Final position	Pld	W	D	L	GF	GA	GD	Win %
Bundesliga	19 August 2023	18 May 2024	Matchday 1	11th	34	10	9	15	50	60	−10	29.41
DFB-Pokal	13 August 2023		First round	First round	1	0	0	1	0	2	−2	0.00
Total					35	10	9	16	50	62	−12	28.57

Source: Soccerway

=== Bundesliga ===
==== League table ====
Pos	Team	Pld	W	D	L	GF	GA	GD	Pts
9	Werder Bremen	34	11	9	14	48	54	−6	42
10	SC Freiburg	34	11	9	14	45	58	−13	42
11	FC Augsburg	34	10	9	15	50	60	−10	39
12	VfL Wolfsburg	34	10	7	17	41	56	−15	37
13	Mainz 05	34	7	14	13	39	51	−12	35

Source: DFB
Rules for classification: 1) Points; 2) Goal difference; 3) Goals scored; 4) Head-to-head results; 5) Head-to-head away goals scored; 6) Away goals scored; 7) Play-off.

==== Results summary ====
Overall								Home						Away					
Pld	W	D	L	GF	GA	GD	Pts	W	D	L	GF	GA	GD	W	D	L	GF	GA	GD
34	10	9	15	50	60	−10	39	6	6	5	26	26	0	4	3	10	24	34	−10

Source: DFB

==== Results by round ====
Round	1	2	3	4	5	6	7	8	9	10	11	12	13	14	15	16	17	18	19	20	21	22	23	24	25	26	27	28	29	30	31	32	33	34
Ground	H	A	H	A	H	A	H	A	H	A	H	A	H	A	H	A	H	A	H	A	H	A	H	A	H	A	H	A	H	A	H	A	H	A
Result	D	L	D	L	W	L	L	W	W	D	D	D	W	L	D	L	L	W	L	D	D	L	W	W	W	W	D	L	W	L	L	L	L	L
Position	9	11	12	15	12	14	15	10	10	10	10	10	9	9	10	11	12	10	13	12	11	14	11	10	9	7	7	7	7	8	8	9	10	11

Source: DFB
A = Away; H = Home; W = Win; D = Draw; L = Loss

==== Matches ====
The league fixtures were unveiled on 30 June 2023.

19 August 2023 1	FC Augsburg	4–4	Borussia Mönchengladbach	Augsburg
15:30 CEST (UTC+2)	Dorsch (yellow card) 23'; Rexhbeçaj 29'; Bauer 41'; Michel 45+7' (pen.); Vargas 76'	Report	Itakura 13'; Čvančara 27', 90+7' (pen.), (yellow card) 32'; Ngoumou 37'; Neuhaus (yellow card) 45+1'	Stadium: WWK Arena; Attendance: 30,660; Referee: Daniel Schlager

27 August 2023 2	Bayern Munich	3–1	FC Augsburg	Munich
17:30 CEST (UTC+2)	Uduokhai 32' (o.g.); Kane 40' (pen.), 69'; Gravenberch (yellow card) 83'	Report	Rexhbeçaj (yellow card) 56'; Cardona (yellow card) 79'; Beljo 86'	Stadium: Allianz Arena; Attendance: 75,000; Referee: Daniel Siebert

2 September 2023 3	FC Augsburg	2–2	VfL Bochum	Augsburg
15:30 CEST (UTC+2)	Beljo 35'; Valentin (yellow card) 38'; Rexhbeçaj (yellow card) 44'; Demirović 62'	Report	Asano 45+3', 64'; Bero (yellow card) 46'; Passlack (yellow card) 48'	Stadium: WWK Arena; Attendance: 27,424; Referee: Martin Petersen

16 September 2023 4	RB Leipzig	3–0	FC Augsburg	Leipzig
15:30 CEST (UTC+2)	Simons 6'; Openda 11'; Raum 27'	Report		Stadium: Red Bull Arena; Attendance: 44,746; Referee: Sascha Stegemann

23 September 2023 5	FC Augsburg	2–1	Mainz 05	Augsburg
15:30 CEST (UTC+2)	Demirović 15', 45'; Engels (yellow card) 60' (yellow-red card) 62'; Dorsch (yellow card) 90+1'; Beljo (yellow card) 90+5'	Report	Ajorque 6'; Gruda (yellow card) 74'; Zentner (yellow card) 77'; Lee (yellow card) 90+7'	Stadium: WWK Arena; Attendance: 27,310; Referee: Marco Fritz

1 October 2023 6	SC Freiburg	2–0	FC Augsburg	Freiburg
17:30 CEST (UTC+2)	Grifo 5' (pen.); Röhl (yellow card) 50'; Lienhart 56'; Sildillia (yellow card) 75'	Report	Breithaupt (yellow card) 60'; Michel (yellow card) 84'	Stadium: Europa-Park Stadion; Attendance: 33,134; Referee: Harm Osmers

7 October 2023 7	FC Augsburg	1–2	Darmstadt 98	Augsburg
15:30 CEST (UTC+2)	Gumny (yellow card) 35'; Michel (yellow card) 66'; Demirović (yellow card) 74', (goal) 86'; Uduokhai (yellow card) 90+4'	Report	Müller (yellow card) 38'; Skarke 52'; Pfeiffer (yellow card) 59'; Kempe 70' (pen.)	Stadium: WWK Arena; Attendance: 29,200; Referee: Deniz Aytekin

22 October 2023 8	1. FC Heidenheim	2–5	FC Augsburg	Heidenheim
17:30 CEST (UTC+2)	Kleindienst 17', (yellow card) 31'; Beste 18'; Beck (yellow card) 51'; Siersleben (yellow card) 90+3'	Report	Tietz 29'; Valentin 41', (yellow card) 45+2'; Demirović 42'; Uduokhai 64'; Bauer (yellow card) 83'; Rexhbecaj 88' (pen.)	Stadium: Voith-Arena; Attendance: 15,000; Referee: Tobias Stieler

28 October 2023 9	FC Augsburg	3–2	VfL Wolfsburg	Augsburg
15:30 CEST (UTC+2)	Tietz 17'; Gouweleeuw (yellow card) 45+5'; Valentin (yellow card) 45+5'; Bornauw 79' (o.g.); Engels 81'; Uduokhai (yellow card) 84' (yellow-red card) 87'; Beljo (yellow card) 85'	Report	Mæhle (yellow card) 6'; Wind 35'; Majer 45' (pen.); Tomás (yellow card) 66'; Arnold (yellow card) 73'; Bornauw (yellow card) 90+2'	Stadium: WWK Arena; Attendance: 28,000; Referee: Daniel Schlager

4 November 2023 10	1. FC Köln	1–1	FC Augsburg	Cologne
15:30 CET (UTC+1)	Maina 16'; Selke (yellow card) 90+7'	Report	Tietz 25'; Demirović (yellow card) 40'; Gouweleeuw (yellow card) 90+2'; Dahmen (yellow card) 90+6'; Breithaupt (yellow card) 90+7'	Stadium: RheinEnergieStadion; Attendance: 49,300; Referee: Christian Dingert

11 November 2023 11	FC Augsburg	1–1	1899 Hoffenheim	Augsburg
15:30 CET (UTC+1)	Uduokhai (yellow card) 44'; Demirović 53'	Report	Weghorst 23'; Prömel (yellow card) 56'; Akpoguma (yellow card) 76'	Stadium: WWK Arena; Attendance: 28,260; Referee: Felix Brych

25 November 2023 12	Union Berlin	1–1	FC Augsburg	Berlin
15:30 CET (UTC+1)	Gosens (yellow card) 37'; Haberer (yellow card) 45+6'; Knoche (penalty missed) 58'; Volland 88'	Report	Demirović 39' (pen.); Dahmen (yellow card) 87'; Mbabu (yellow card) 90+5'	Stadium: Stadion An der Alten Försterei; Attendance: 22,012; Referee: Florian Badstübner

3 December 2023 13	FC Augsburg	2–1	Eintracht Frankfurt	Augsburg
19:30 CET (UTC+1)	Jensen 35'; Iago 58'; Valentin (yellow card) 73'; Demirović (penalty missed) 76'	Report	Buta (yellow card) 27'; Dahmen 78' (o.g.)	Stadium: WWK Arena; Attendance: 26,107; Referee: Harm Osmers

9 December 2023 14	Werder Bremen	2–0	FC Augsburg	Bremen
15:30 CET (UTC+1)	Stark 39'; Ducksch 65'; Zetterer (yellow card) 78'	Report	Demirović (yellow card) 27'; Dorsch (yellow card) 80'	Stadium: Weserstadion; Attendance: 41,000; Referee: Sascha Stegemann

16 December 2023 15	FC Augsburg	1–1	Borussia Dortmund	Augsburg
15:30 CET (UTC+1)	Demirović 23'; Gouweleeuw (yellow card) 80'; Gumny (yellow card) 90+4'	Report	Malen 35'; Haller (yellow card) 90+1'	Stadium: WWK Arena; Attendance: 30,660; Referee: Matthias Jöllenbeck

20 December 2023 16	VfB Stuttgart	3–0	FC Augsburg	Stuttgart
20:30 CET (UTC+1)	Undav 18'; Guirassy 45+1'; Führich 69'	Report	Demirović (yellow card) 12'; Gumny (yellow card) 62'; Valentin (yellow card) 71'; Dorsch (yellow card) 81'	Stadium: MHPArena; Attendance: 53,600; Referee: Daniel Siebert

13 January 2024 17	FC Augsburg	0–1	Bayer Leverkusen	Augsburg
15:30 CET (UTC+1)	Vargas (yellow card) 18'; Iago (yellow card) 19'; Dorsch (yellow card) 44'	Report	Hofmann (yellow card) 45+1'; Palacios 90+4'	Stadium: WWK Arena; Attendance: 30,055; Referee: Sven Jablonski

21 January 2024 18	Borussia Mönchengladbach	1–2	FC Augsburg	Mönchengladbach
17:30 CET (UTC+1)	Pefok 26'; Netz (yellow card) 67'	Report	Rexhbeçaj (yellow card) 41'; Tietz 47'; Engels 51'; Jakić (yellow card) 80'	Stadium: Borussia-Park; Attendance: 44,867; Referee: Martin Petersen

27 January 2024 19	FC Augsburg	2–3	Bayern Munich	Augsburg
15:30 CET (UTC+1)	Mbabu (yellow card) 19'; Demirović 52', 90+4' (pen.); Iago (yellow card) 69'; Michel (penalty missed) 88'	Report	De Ligt (yellow card) 6'; Pavlović 23', (yellow card) 67'; Davies 45+5'; Kane 58'; Sané (yellow card) 80'; Guerreiro (yellow card) 90+6'; Goretzka (yellow card) 90+7'; Neuer (yellow card) 90+8'	Stadium: WWK Arena; Attendance: 30,660; Referee: Christian Dingert

3 February 2024 20	VfL Bochum	1–1	FC Augsburg	Bochum
15:30 CET (UTC+1)	Broschinski 33', (yellow card) 44'; Oermann (yellow card) 45+4'; Osterhage (yellow card) 76'	Report	Jakić (yellow card) 70'; Demirović 90+1' (pen.)	Stadium: Vonovia Ruhrstadion; Attendance: 24,500; Referee: Patrick Ittrich

10 February 2024 21	FC Augsburg	2–2	RB Leipzig	Augsburg
15:30 CET (UTC+1)	Tietz 35'; Gouweleeuw (yellow card) 55'; Demirović 60'; Jakić (yellow card) 64'; Vargas (yellow card) 70'; Dahmen (yellow card) 81'; Mbabu (yellow card) 90+5'	Report	Openda 39', (penalty missed) 81'; Šeško 52'; Raum (yellow card) 74'	Stadium: WWK Arena; Attendance: 28,510; Referee: Benjamin Brand

17 February 2024 22	Mainz 05	1–0	FC Augsburg	Mainz
15:30 CET (UTC+1)	Lee (yellow card) 35'; Van den Berg 44', (yellow card) 90+14'; Amiri (penalty missed) 45+6'; Kohr (yellow card) 90+7'	Report	Dahmen (yellow card) 45+5'; Gouweleeuw (yellow card) 90+7'; Valentin (red card) 90+14'	Stadium: Mewa Arena; Attendance: 24,800; Referee: Tobias Reichel

25 February 2024 23	FC Augsburg	2–1	SC Freiburg	Augsburg
19:30 CET (UTC+1)	Vargas (yellow card) 23'; Uduokhai 72'; Bauer (yellow card) 79'; Engels 81'; Iago (yellow card) 89'	Report	Grifo 19' (pen.); Höfler (yellow card) 79'	Stadium: WWK Arena; Attendance: 28,894; Referee: Bastian Dankert

2 March 2024 24	Darmstadt 98	0–6	FC Augsburg	Darmstadt
15:30 CET (UTC+1)	Müller (yellow card) 17'; Karić (yellow card) 45+1'	Report	Tietz 2', 84'; Jensen 12'; Demirović 20', 29'; Vargas 25'	Stadium: Merck-Stadion am Böllenfalltor; Attendance: 17,810; Referee: Felix Zwayer

9 March 2024 25	FC Augsburg	1–0	1. FC Heidenheim	Augsburg
15:30 CET (UTC+1)	Gouweleeuw 22'; Mbabu (yellow card) 27'	Report	Gimber (yellow card) 74'; Pick (yellow card) 90+3'; Theuerkauf (yellow card) 90+4'	Stadium: WWK Arena; Attendance: 30,660; Referee: Frank Willenborg

16 March 2024 26	VfL Wolfsburg	1–3	FC Augsburg	Wolfsburg
15:30 CET (UTC+1)	Wimmer 9', (red card) 45'; Svanberg (yellow card) 82'	Report	Maier 45+2'; Jakić 61', 79'; Jensen (yellow card) 64'; Demirović (yellow card) 68'; Biel (yellow card) 70'	Stadium: Volkswagen Arena; Attendance: 21,735; Referee: Timo Gerach

31 March 2024 27	FC Augsburg	1–1	1. FC Köln	Augsburg
15:30 CEST (UTC+2)	Maier 18'	Report	Selke 33'; Alidou (yellow card) 61'; Ljubičić (yellow card) 89'; Maina (yellow card) 89'	Stadium: WWK Arena; Attendance: 28,000; Referee: Sören Storks

7 April 2024 28	1899 Hoffenheim	3–1	FC Augsburg	Sinsheim
15:30 CEST (UTC+2)	Weghorst 17', (yellow card) 88'; Kramarić 20'; Jurásek (yellow card) 41'; Kadeřábek (yellow card) 51'; Bebou 90'	Report	Tietz (yellow card) 38'; Demirović 61'	Stadium: Rhein-Neckar-Arena; Attendance: 28,881; Referee: Florian Exner

12 April 2024 29	FC Augsburg	2–0	Union Berlin	Augsburg
20:30 CEST (UTC+2)	Tietz 47'; Michel 82'; Breithaupt (yellow card) 90+2'	Report	Khedira (yellow card) 37'	Stadium: WWK Arena; Attendance: 29,731; Referee: Tobias Stieler

19 April 2024 30	Eintracht Frankfurt	3–1	FC Augsburg	Frankfurt
20:30 CEST (UTC+2)	Chaïbi 55'; Ekitike 61'; Koch (yellow card) 90'; Knauff (yellow card) 90+3'; Marmoush 90+5', (yellow card) 90+7'	Report	Vargas 13'; Engels (yellow card) 49'; Demirović (yellow card) 65'; Gouweleeuw (yellow card) 67'	Stadium: Deutsche Bank Park; Attendance: 57,600; Referee: Martin Petersen

27 April 2024 31	FC Augsburg	0–3	Werder Bremen	Augsburg
15:30 CEST (UTC+2)	Jakić (yellow card) 64'	Report	Friedl (yellow card) 5'; Schmid 52'; Ducksch 61' (pen.); Woltemade (yellow card) 63'; Deman 90'	Stadium: WWK Arena; Attendance: 30,660; Referee: Tobias Welz

4 May 2024 32	Borussia Dortmund	5–1	FC Augsburg	Dortmund
15:30 CEST (UTC+2)	Moukoko 4', 29'; Malen 20'; Reus 34'; Nmecha 64'	Report	Bauer (yellow card) 10'; Vargas 32'	Stadium: Signal Iduna Park; Attendance: 81,365; Referee: Robert Schröder

10 May 2024 33	FC Augsburg	0–1	VfB Stuttgart	Augsburg
20:30 CEST (UTC+2)	Demirović (yellow card) 63'; Mbabu (yellow card) 76'; Iago (yellow card) 82'	Report	Anton (yellow card) 42'; Guirassy 48'; Jeong (yellow card) 72'	Stadium: WWK Arena; Attendance: 30,660; Referee: Patrick Ittrich

18 May 2024 34	Bayer Leverkusen	2–1	FC Augsburg	Leverkusen
15:30 CEST (UTC+2)	Boniface 12'; Andrich 27'	Report	Kömür 62'; Uduokhai (yellow card) 82'	Stadium: BayArena; Attendance: 30,210; Referee: Matthias Jöllenbeck

=== DFB-Pokal ===
13 August 2023 First round	SpVgg Unterhaching	2–0	FC Augsburg	Unterhaching
15:30 CEST (UTC+2)	Fetsch 29'; Schifferl (yellow card) 74'; Mashigo 90+4'	Report	Valentin (yellow card) 64'	Stadium: Sportpark Unterhaching; Attendance: 12,500; Referee: Timo Gerach

== Statistics ==
=== Appearances and goals ===
No.	Pos	Nat	Player	Total		Bundesliga		DFB-Pokal	
No.	Pos	Nat	Player	Apps	Goals	Apps	Goals	Apps	Goals
Goalkeepers
1	GK	(Germany) GER	Finn Dahmen	25	0	24	0	1	0
33	GK	(Poland) POL	Marcel Łubik	0	0	0	0	0	0
40	GK	(Czech Republic) CZE	Tomáš Koubek	0	0	0	0	0	0
Defenders
2	DF	(Poland) POL	Robert Gumny	13	0	6+7	0	0	0
3	DF	(Denmark) DEN	Mads Valentin	20	1	13+6	1	0+1	0
5	DF	(Ghana) GHA	Patric Pfeiffer	7	0	4+2	0	1	0
6	DF	(Netherlands) NED	Jeffrey Gouweleeuw	20	0	19+1	0	0	0
19	DF	(Germany) GER	Felix Uduokhai	23	2	23	2	0	0
22	DF	(Brazil) BRA	Iago	18	1	13+5	1	0	0
23	DF	(Germany) GER	Maximilian Bauer	10	1	6+4	1	0	0
32	DF	(Germany) GER	Raphael Framberger	0	0	0	0	0	0
43	DF	(Switzerland) SUI	Kevin Mbabu	18	0	15+3	0	0	0
Midfielders
4	MF	(England) ENG	Reece Oxford	0	0	0	0	0	0
8	MF	(Kosovo) KOS	Elvis Rexhbeçaj	24	2	23	2	0+1	0
10	MF	(Germany) GER	Arne Maier	13	0	1+11	0	1	0
11	MF	(Spain) ESP	Pep Biel	4	0	0+4	0	0	0
16	MF	(Switzerland) SUI	Ruben Vargas	22	2	15+6	2	1	0
17	MF	(Croatia) CRO	Kristijan Jakić	7	0	6+1	0	0	0
18	MF	(Germany) GER	Tim Breithaupt	11	0	2+8	0	1	0
24	MF	(Finland) FIN	Fredrik Jensen	19	2	15+4	2	0	0
27	MF	(Belgium) BEL	Arne Engels	23	3	9+13	3	1	0
30	MF	(Germany) GER	Niklas Dorsch	18	0	14+3	0	1	0
36	MF	(Germany) GER	Mert Kömür	0	0	0	0	0	0
Forwards
7	FW	(Croatia) CRO	Dion Beljo	19	2	3+15	2	0+1	0
9	FW	(Bosnia and Herzegovina) BIH	Ermedin Demirović	25	14	24	14	1	0
20	FW	(Germany) GER	Sven Michel	16	1	5+10	1	1	0
21	FW	(Germany) GER	Phillip Tietz	25	7	21+3	7	0+1	0
Players transferred out during the season
11	FW	(Germany) GER	Mërgim Berisha	3	0	2	0	0+1	0
14	MF	(Japan) JPN	Masaya Okugawa	2	0	0+2	0	0	0
15	DF	(Croatia) CRO	Jozo Stanić	0	0	0	0	0	0
17	MF	(Germany) GER	Noah Sarenren Bazee	0	0	0	0	0	0
26	DF	(Denmark) DEN	Frederik Winther	1	0	0	0	1	0
34	FW	(France) FRA	Nathanaël Mbuku	1	0	0+1	0	0	0
38	DF	(Croatia) CRO	David Čolina	1	0	0	0	1	0
39	DF	(England) ENG	Japhet Tanganga	0	0	0	0	0	0
42	DF	(Germany) GER	Aaron Zehnter	0	0	0	0	0	0
48	FW	(France) FRA	Irvin Cardona	3	0	0+3	0	0	0

Last updated: 2 March 2024
Source: Competitions

=== Goalscorers ===
As of 2 March 2024

Rank	Pos.	No.	Nat.	Player	Bundesliga	DFB-Pokal	Total
1	FW	9	(Bosnia and Herzegovina)	Ermedin Demirović	14	0	14
2	FW	21	(Germany)	Phillip Tietz	7	0	7
3	MF	27	(Belgium)	Arne Engels	3	0	3
4	FW	7	(Croatia)	Dion Drena Beljo	2	0	2
4	MF	8	(Kosovo)	Elvis Rexhbeçaj	2	0	2
4	DF	19	(Germany)	Felix Uduokhai	2	0	2
4	MF	16	(Switzerland)	Ruben Vargas	2	0	2
4	MF	24	(Finland)	Fredrik Jensen	2	0	2
9	DF	3	(Denmark)	Mads Valentin	1	0	1
9	FW	20	(Germany)	Sven Michel	1	0	1
9	DF	23	(Germany)	Maximilian Bauer	1	0	1
9	DF	22	(Brazil)	Iago	1	0	1
Own goals					1	0	1
Totals					39	0	39
