= Efe-Kaan Sihlaroglu =

Footballer (born 2005)

Personal information
- Date of birth: 8 July 2005 (age 21)
- Place of birth: Mannheim, Germany
- Height: 1.78 m (5 ft 10 in)
- Position: Midfielder

Team information
- Current team: Iğdır

Youth career
- VfR Mannheim
- Waldhof Mannheim
- 1. FC Kaiserslautern
- 2016–2024: Karlsruher SC

Senior career*
Years	Team	Apps	(Gls)
2021–2026	Karlsruher SC	1	(0)
2026	Karlsruher SC II	11	(1)
2026–	Iğdır	0	(0)

International career
2022	Turkey U17	6	(1)
- * Club domestic league appearances and goals as of 16 May 2026

Efe-Kaan Sihlaroglu (Turkish: Sihlaroğlu; born 8 July 2005) is a professional footballer who plays as a midfielder for TFF 1. Lig club Iğdır. Born in Germany, he has represented Turkey at youth international level.

== Club career ==
Sihlaroglu is a youth academy graduate of Karlsruher SC. He signed his first professional contract with the club on 28 October 2021. He made his professional debut for the club on 27 November 2021 in a 4–0 league win against Hannover 96. His debut at the age of 16 years and 142 days made him the youngest player ever to appear in a 2. Bundesliga match, a record which was previously held by Philipp Sonn.

== International career ==
Born in Germany, Sihlaroglu is of Turkish descent. He was called to a training camp for the Turkey U17s in December 2021. In May 2022, he was named in the squad for the 2022 UEFA European Under-17 Championship.

== Career statistics ==
=== Club ===
As of 27 November 2021

Appearances and goals by club, season and competition
Club	Season	League			Cup		Continental		Total	
Club	Season	Division	Apps	Goals	Apps	Goals	Apps	Goals	Apps	Goals
Karlsruher SC	2021–22	2. Bundesliga	1	0	0	0	—		1	0
Career total			1	0	0	0	0	0	1	0
