= Iğdır F.K. =

Iğdır FK
- Full name: Iğdır Futbol Kulübü
- Founded: 2016
- Ground: Iğdır City Stadium, Iğdır
- Capacity: 2,700
- Coordinates: 39°54′36″N 44°01′46″E
- Owner: Alagöz Holding
- Chairman: Cantürk Alagöz
- Head coach: Kenan Koçak
- League: TFF 1. Lig
- 2025–26: TFF 1. Lig, 13th of 20
- Website: igdirspor.com
| Home colours | Away colours |

Iğdır Futbol Kulübü, known as Alagöz Holding Iğdır Futbol Kulübü due to sponsorship reasons, is a Turkish professional football club based in Iğdır. They play in the TFF First League. The club plays in green and white kits.

== History ==
In its inaugural 2016–17 season, 76 Iğdır Belediyespor finished as the leader of the Iğdır First Amateur League. However, the team lost the play-out match against Iğdır Arasspor, which represented the Iğdır province in the Regional Amateur League. At the end of the 2017–18 season, 76 Iğdır Belediyespor once again lost the play-out match to the same club. In the 2018–19 season, the club — facing the same opponent now renamed Iğdır Esspor — was defeated for a third consecutive time in the play-out.

During the 2020–21 season, the club represented Iğdır in the Regional Amateur League, finishing first in Group 8 of the 4th Region and qualifying for the regional play-offs. In the play-off final, the team defeated Diyarbakırspor 1–0, earning promotion to the TFF Third League for the first time in its history.

In September 2021, the club underwent a name change and officially became Iğdır Futbol Kulübü (Iğdır FK). Competing in the TFF Third League, Group 2, the team finished third and qualified for the play-offs, where it eliminated 68 Aksaray Belediyespor in the semifinals but lost the final to İskenderunspor on penalties after a draw.

At the end of the 2022–23 season, Iğdır FK won Group 2 of the TFF Third League, achieving promotion to the TFF Second League for the first time in its history. In its debut Second League season (2023–24), the club finished third in the Red Group, qualifying once again for the play-offs. Iğdır FK eliminated İskenderunspor in the first round, 24 Erzincanspor in the second round, and Kastamonuspor 1966 in the third round, before defeating 1461 Trabzon FK in the play-off final to secure promotion to the TFF First League for the first time in club history.

Two Iğdır players (Ryan Mendes of Cape Verde and Leandro Bacuna of Curaçao) captained their countries at the FIFA World Cup 2026; a big achievement for a small club in the Turkish second flight.

== League participations ==
- TFF First League
  - 2024–
- TFF Second League
  - 2023–2024
- TFF Third League
  - 2021–2023
- Turkish Regional Amateur League
  - 2020–2021
- Super Amateur Leagues
  - 2016–2020

== Current squad ==
As of 23 September 2026

Note: Flags indicate national team as defined under FIFA eligibility rules; some limited exceptions apply. Players may hold more than one non-FIFA nationality.

| No. | Pos. | Nation | Player |
|---|---|---|---|
| 1 | GK | TUR | Muhammet Taha Tepe |
| 2 | DF | TUR | Baran Moğultay |
| 3 | DF | TUR | Emrecan Terzi |
| 4 | DF | TUR | Arda Öztürk (on loan from Trabzonspor) |
| 5 | DF | TUR | Alim Öztürk |
| 6 | DF | TUR | Devran Şenyurt |
| 7 | FW | SEN | Moustapha Camara |
| 8 | MF | TUR | Efe-Kaan Sihlaroglu |
| 9 | FW | TUR | Arda Çolak |
| 10 | MF | CUW | Leandro Bacuna |
| 11 | MF | TUR | Malik Yılmaz |
| 17 | FW | TUR | Serdar Gürler |
| 18 | DF | FRA | Loïc Kouagba |
| 19 | FW | TUR | Özder Özcan |
| 21 | MF | TUR | Doğan Erdoğan |
| 22 | DF | TUR | Alperen Selvi |

| No. | Pos. | Nation | Player |
|---|---|---|---|
| 23 | FW | BIH | Dino Hotić |
| 24 | MF | ITA | Giovanni Crociata |
| 28 | DF | TUR | Soner Gönül |
| 29 | GK | POL | Jakub Szumski |
| 33 | FW | GHA | Felix Afena-Gyan |
| 35 | GK | TUR | Eren Karataş |
| 39 | DF | TUR | Hüseyin Karabey |
| 44 | MF | TUR | Leon Çalıskan |
| 58 | MF | DEN | Gökcan Kaya |
| 61 | DF | TUR | Serkan Asan |
| 76 | GK | GER | Cem Bagci |
| 77 | DF | TUR | Ahmet Köse |
| 94 | DF | TUR | Fahri Pınar |
| 95 | DF | TUR | Yiğit Ali Buz |
| 99 | FW | BRA | Douglas Tanque |

=== Out on loan ===
Note: Flags indicate national team as defined under FIFA eligibility rules; some limited exceptions apply. Players may hold more than one non-FIFA nationality.

| No. | Pos. | Nation | Player |
|---|---|---|---|
| — | GK | TUR | Melih Akyüz (at Ankara Demirspor until 30 June 2027) |
| — | MF | TUR | Emirhan Altundağ (at Ankara Demirspor until 30 June 2027) |
| — | MF | TUR | Ali Kaan Güneren (at Muğlaspor until 30 June 2027) |

| No. | Pos. | Nation | Player |
|---|---|---|---|
| — | MF | TUR | Yusuf İnci (at Kahramanmaraş İstiklalspor until 30 June 2027) |
| — | MF | TUR | Ertuğrul Yıldırım (at Erbaaspor until 30 June 2027) |

== See also ==
- Iğdırspor
