= Kenan Koçak =

Turkish football manager (born 1981)

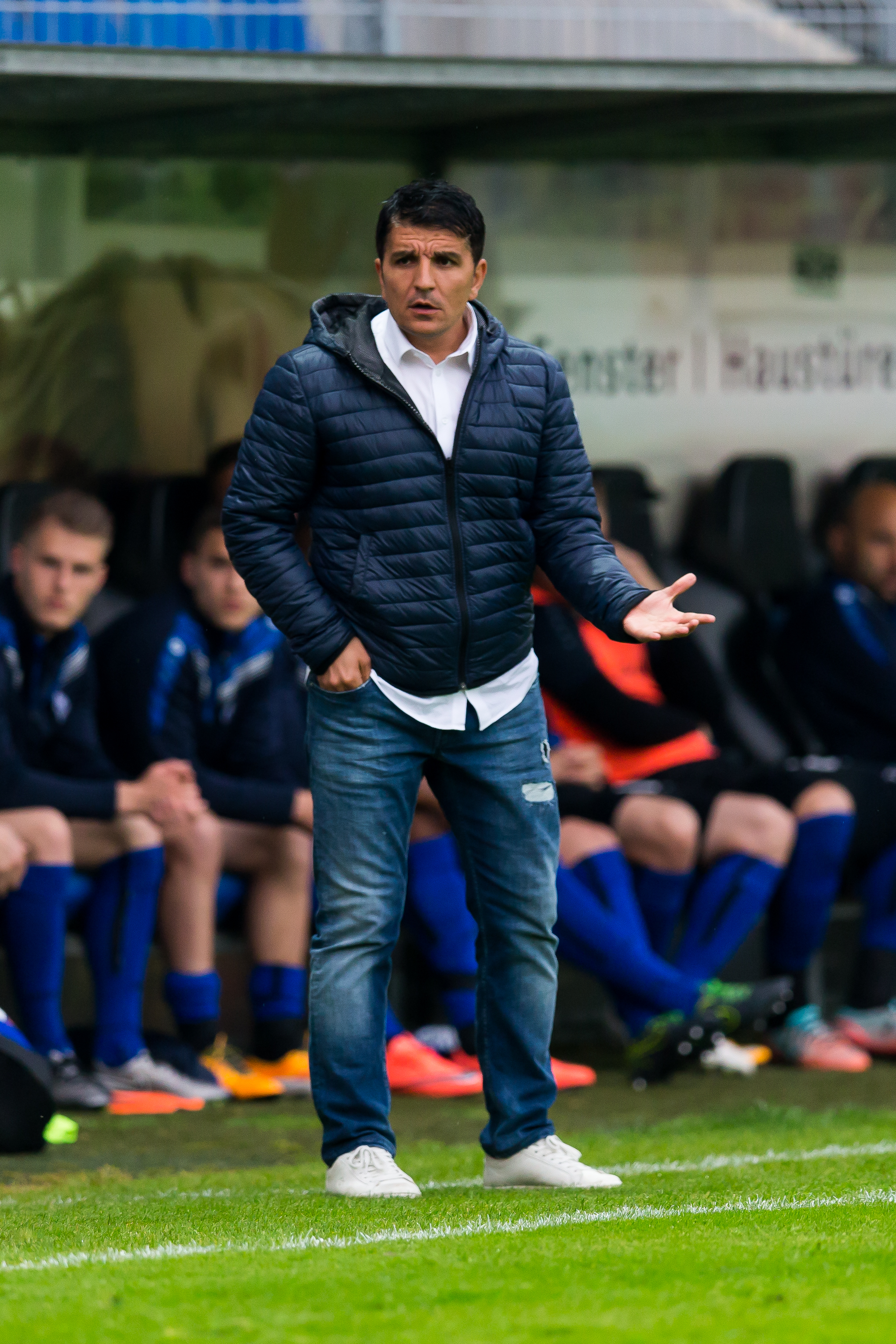
- Koçak managing Waldhof Mannheim in 2016

Personal information
- Full name: Kenan Koçak
- Date of birth: 5 January 1981 (age 45)
- Place of birth: Kayseri, Turkey
- Height: 1.74 m (5 ft 9 in)
- Position: Midfielder

Team information
- Current team: Iğdır (head coach)

Youth career
- 1999–2000: Waldhof Mannheim

Senior career*
Years	Team	Apps	(Gls)
2000–2001	Waldhof Mannheim	0	(0)
2001–2002	DSV Leoben	0	(0)
2002–2003	Waldhof Mannheim	8	(0)
2003–2004	Austria Salzburg	2	(0)
2004	Waldhof Mannheim	0	(0)
2004–2006	Reutlingen 05	0	(0)
2006	ASV Durlach		(0)
2006	1. FC Pforzheim	9	(2)
2006–2009	Waldhof Mannheim	6	(0)
2009–2010	Türkspor Mannheim		

Managerial career
- 2009–2010: Türkspor Mannheim
- 2013–2016: Waldhof Mannheim
- 2016–2018: SV Sandhausen
- 2019–2021: Hannover 96
- 2024: Ankaragücü
- 2024–2025: SV Sandhausen
- 2026–: Iğdır
- * Club domestic league appearances and goals

Kenan Koçak (born 5 January 1981) is a Turkish football coach and a former player. He is currently serving as the head coach of TFF 1. Lig side Iğdır.

== Playing career ==
Koçak was a youth product of Waldhof Mannheim. He played sparsely for Waldhof Mannheim, Austria Salzburg, SSV Reutlingen, 1. FC Pforzheim, and finally as a player-manager for Türkspor Mannheim.

== Managerial career ==
=== VfR Mannheim ===
In the winter break of the 2010–11 season Kenan Koçak became manager of VfR Mannheim. In his first competitive match as coach, his team was able to knock out the local rival of Waldhof Mannheim in the quarter-final of the Baden Cup. In the regular season, Koçak reached second place with VfR Mannheim in the Verbandsliga Baden. In the promotion play-off, his team faced FV Ravensburg. The first leg ended in a 1–1 draw. The second match was won by Mannheim with 2–0. As a result, Mannheim reached the Oberliga Baden-Württemberg. In his first Oberliga season, Koçak's team finished in second place. After the first half of the 2011–12 season, VfR Mannheim was even at the top of the Oberliga. In the 2012–13 season, Mannheim finished in third place. After this season, Koçak left the club and became manager of Waldhof Mannheim, which played in the Regionalliga Südwest at the time.

=== Waldhof Mannheim ===
Waldhof Mannheim hired Koçak on 7 June 2013 and had his first match on 29 July 2013 against SSV Ulm. The final score was 4–2 for Waldhof Mannheim. The club finished the 2013–14 season in fifth place. In the following season, Waldhof Mannheim dropped down to 13th place. Waldhof Mannheim won the Regionalliga Südwest during the 2015–16 season. In the promotion play-off, they faced off against Sportfreunde Lotte. The first leg ended in a 0–0 draw and the second leg ended in a 2–0 win for Lotte. Koçak left Waldhof Mannheim on 3 July 2016 to become manager of SV Sandhausen.

=== SV Sandhausen ===
Koçak became manager of Sandhausen on 3 July 2016. Kocak's debut match was a 2–2 draw against Fortuna Düsseldorf. His first win with Sandhausen came on 22 August 2016 in a 2–1 win against SC Paderborn. He was sacked on 8 October 2018.

=== Hannover 96 ===
On 14 November 2019, Koçak was appointed as manager of Hannover 96. He left at the end of the 2020–21 season.

=== Turkey ===
On 27 September 2021, Turkish Football Federation announced that Koçak joined in technical staff of Turkey as Assistant Coach to Stefan Kuntz.

=== Ankaragücü ===
On 18 September 2024, he started coaching the 1. Lig club Ankaragücü, until December 2024.

=== Return to Sandhausen ===
In December 2024, he returned to SV Sandhausen. He left in April 2025.

== Managerial statistics ==
As of 6 April 2025

Team	From	To	Record								
Team	From	To	M	W	D	L	GF	GA	GD	Win %	Ref.
Waldhof Mannheim	7 June 2013	3 July 2016	104	48	26	30	148	94	+54	46.15	
SV Sandhausen	3 July 2016	8 October 2018	82	24	25	33	94	93	+1	29.27	
Hannover 96	14 November 2019	30 June 2021	57	23	10	24	96	83	+13	40.35	
Ankaragücü	18 September 2024	20 December 2024	14	8	2	4	24	16	+8	57.14	
SV Sandhausen	28 December 2024	6 April 2025	13	2	2	9	21	25	−4	15.38	
Total			270	105	65	100	383	311	+72	38.89	—
