= Gökcan Kaya =

Danish footballer (born 1995)

Personal information
- Date of birth: 7 August 1995 (age 31)
- Place of birth: Randers, Denmark
- Height: 1.80 m (5 ft 11 in)
- Position: Midfielder

Team information
- Current team: Iğdır
- Number: 58

Youth career
- Randers

Senior career*
Years	Team	Apps	(Gls)
2015–2016	Hobro	22	(1)
2016–2017	Manisaspor	4	(0)
2017–2021	Tuzlaspor	131	(7)
2021–2022	Eyüpspor	12	(0)
2022	→ Pendikspor (loan)	16	(1)
2022–2025	Pendikspor	82	(3)
2025–	Iğdır	67	(4)

International career
2013	Denmark U-18	1	(0)
2014	Denmark U-19	3	(0)
2015	Denmark U-20	1	(0)
- * Club domestic league appearances and goals as of 24 October 2026

Gökcan Kaya (born 7 August 1995) is a Danish professional footballer who plays as a midfielder for Turkish TFF 1. Lig club Iğdır.

== Club career ==
=== Denmark ===
In May 2012 at the age of 16, Kaya signed a youth-contract with Randers FC.

He got his debut for the first team in a cup-match against Kolding BK which Randers won 7–1, with Kaya starting on the bench, later replacing Mads Fenger in the 62nd minute.

On 10 June 2015, it was announced, that Kaya had signed a contract with Hobro IK. Kaya got his debut for Hobro on 19 July 2015, in a 3–0 defeat against OB.

=== Turkey ===
On 29 August 2016, it was confirmed, that Kaya moved to Turkish club Manisaspor. On the last day of the transfer window in January 2017, Kaya was sold after five months in Manisaspor to Tuzlaspor.

On 15 July 2021, Kaya joined Eyüpspor. On 19 January 2022, Kaya was loaned out to TFF Second League club Pendikspor for the rest of the season. He got his official debut two days later against Zonguldak Kömürspor.
