= Soner Gönül =

Turkish footballer

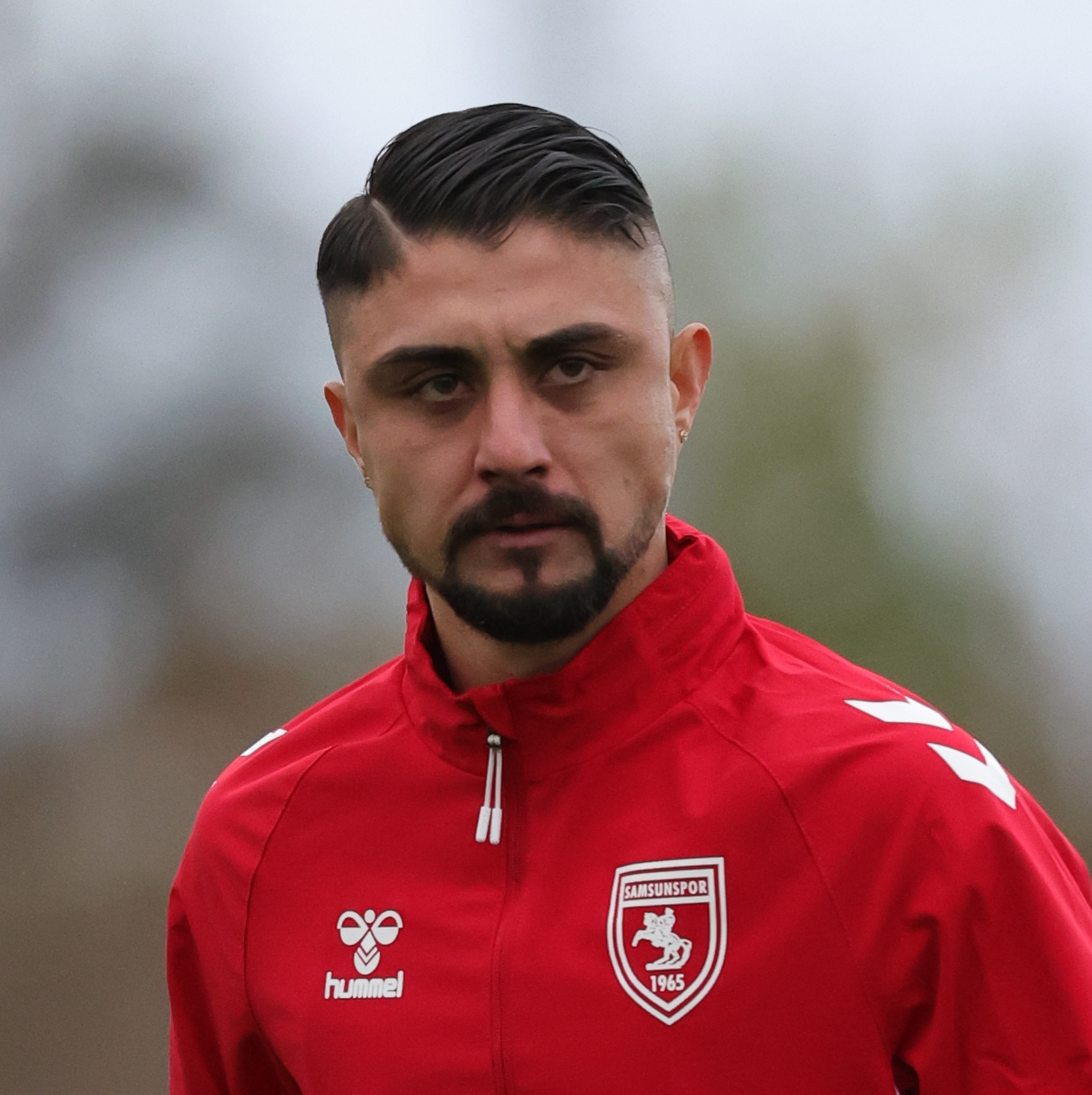
- Gönül in 2025

Personal information
- Date of birth: 11 June 1997 (age 29)
- Place of birth: Giresun, Turkey
- Height: 1.77 m (5 ft 10 in)
- Position: Left back

Team information
- Current team: Iğdır
- Number: 28

Youth career
- 2007–2013: Giresunspor
- 2013–2018: Galatasaray

Senior career*
Years	Team	Apps	(Gls)
2017–2018	→ Erbaaspor (loan)	31	(3)
2018–2019	Başkent Akademi F.K.	32	(1)
2019–2021	Keçiörengücü	49	(4)
2021–2026	Samsunspor	123	(0)
2026–	Iğdır	3	(0)
- * Club domestic league appearances and goals as of 10 June 2026

Soner Gönül (born 11 June 1997) is a Turkish footballer who plays as a left back for Iğdır.

== Career statistics ==
As of 25 September 2024

Appearances and goals by club, season and competition
Club	Season	League			Cup		Total	
Club	Season	Division	Apps	Goals	Apps	Goals	Apps	Goals
Erbaaspor (loan)	2017–18	TFF 3. Lig	30	3	1	0	31	3
Başkent Akademi F.K.	2018–19	TFF 2. Lig	30	0	2	1	32	1
Keçiörengücü	2019–20	TFF 1. Lig	11	1	4	0	15	1
Keçiörengücü	2020–21	TFF 1. Lig	34	3	0	0	34	3
Keçiörengücü	Total		45	4	4	0	49	4
Samsunspor	2021–22	TFF 1. Lig	33	0	0	0	33	0
Samsunspor	2022–23	TFF 1. Lig	25	0	2	0	27	0
Samsunspor	2023–24	Süper Lig	24	0	2	0	26	0
Samsunspor	2024–25	Süper Lig	2	0	0	0	2	0
Samsunspor	Total		84	0	4	0	88	0
Career totals			189	7	11	1	200	8

== Honours ==
Samsunspor

- TFF First League: 2022–23
