= Tim Breithaupt =

German footballer

Personal information
- Date of birth: 7 February 2002 (age 24)
- Place of birth: Offenburg, Germany
- Height: 1.92 m (6 ft 4 in)
- Position: Defensive midfielder

Team information
- Current team: FC Augsburg
- Number: 18

Youth career
- SV Nesselried
- Offenburger FV
- –2017: SC Freiburg
- 2017–2020: Karlsruher SC

Senior career*
Years	Team	Apps	(Gls)
2020–2023	Karlsruher SC	57	(1)
2023–	FC Augsburg	18	(0)
2024–	FC Augsburg II	2	(0)
2025	→ 1. FC Kaiserslautern (loan)	12	(0)
2025–2026	→ Fortuna Düsseldorf (loan)	16	(0)

International career^{‡}
2021–2022	Germany U20	7	(0)
2023	Germany U21	3	(0)
- * Club domestic league appearances and goals as of 18 May 2026 ‡ National team caps and goals as of 15:06, 19 October 2023 (UTC)

Tim Breithaupt (born 7 February 2002) is a German professional footballer who plays as a defensive midfielder for Bundesliga club FC Augsburg.

== Career ==
Breithaupt began his youth career at hometown club SV Nesselried, and later played for the youth team of Offenburger FV. He then joined SC Freiburg, beginning with the under-13 team, before moving to the youth academy of Karlsruher SC in 2017. Breithaupt made his professional debut for Karlsruhe's senior team in the 2. Bundesliga on 2 January 2021, coming on as a substitute in the 86th minute for Jérôme Gondorf against Würzburger Kickers. The away match finished as a 4–2 win for Karlsruhe.

On 3 February 2025, Breithaupt joined 1. FC Kaiserslautern in 2. Bundesliga on loan.

On 1 September 2025, Breithaupt moved on a new 2. Bundesliga loan, joining Fortuna Düsseldorf for the season, with an option to buy.

== Career statistics ==
=== Club ===
As of match played 1 September 2024

Appearances and goals by club, season and competition
Club	Season	League			Cup		Other		Total	
Club	Season	Division	Apps	Goals	Apps	Goals	Apps	Goals	Apps	Goals
Karlsruher SC	2020–21	2. Bundesliga	6	0	0	0	—		6	0
Karlsruher SC	2021–22	2. Bundesliga	29	0	4	0	—		33	0
Karlsruher SC	2022–23	2. Bundesliga	22	1	2	1	—		24	2
Karlsruher SC	Total		57	1	6	1	—		63	2
FC Augsburg	2023–24	Bundesliga	16	0	1	0	—		17	0
FC Augsburg	2024–25	Bundesliga	2	0	1	0	—		3	0
FC Augsburg	Total		18	0	2	0	0	0	20	0
Career total			75	1	8	1	0	0	83	2
