= Braydon Manu =

German footballer (born 1997)

Personal information
- Full name: Braydon Marvin Manu
- Date of birth: 28 March 1997 (age 29)
- Place of birth: Hamburg, Germany
- Height: 1.74 m (5 ft 9 in)
- Positions: Forward; right winger

Team information
- Current team: Akritas Chlorakas
- Number: 37

Youth career
- Hamburger SV
- –2013: FC St. Pauli
- 2013–2014: SC Condor Hamburg
- 2014–2015: LSK Hansa
- 2015–2016: Eintracht Braunschweig

Senior career*
Years	Team	Apps	(Gls)
2016–2017	Eintracht Braunschweig II	23	(2)
2017–2019	Hallescher FC	58	(6)
2019–2024	Darmstadt 98	60	(11)
2021	→ Hallescher FC (loan)	18	(4)
2024–2026	PEC Zwolle	2	(0)
2025	→ VfL Osnabrück (loan)	16	(0)
2026–	Akritas Chlorakas	13	(1)
- * Club domestic league appearances and goals as of 14 June 2026

Braydon Marvin Manu (born 28 March 1997) is a professional footballer who plays as a forward or right winger for Cypriot club Akritas Chlorakas. Born in Germany, he represents Ghana internationally.

== Career ==
In June 2017, Manu signed for 3. Liga club Hallescher FC on a two-year contract. In December 2018, Manu agreed a new contract with Hallescher FC on a contract until summer 2020.

In June 2019, it was announced Manu would join 2. Bundesliga side SV Darmstadt 98 for the 2019–20 season having agreed a contract until 2022.

Manu re-joined Hallescher FC on loan for the rest of the 2020–21 season in January 2021.

On 12 May 2024, Darmstadt 98 announced that he and several other players will leave the club after this season.

On 30 July 2024, Manu signed a two-year contract with an option for a third year with PEC Zwolle in the Netherlands. On 3 February 2025, Manu returned to Germany and joined VfL Osnabrück in 3. Liga on loan. The contract with PEC Zwolle was mutually terminated on 6 January 2026.

== Personal life ==
Born in Germany, Manu is of Ghanaian descent.

In September 2021, Manu was called up to the Ghana national team for a World Cup qualifier against South Africa. He remained on the bench in the game.
