= Tim Skarke =

German footballer

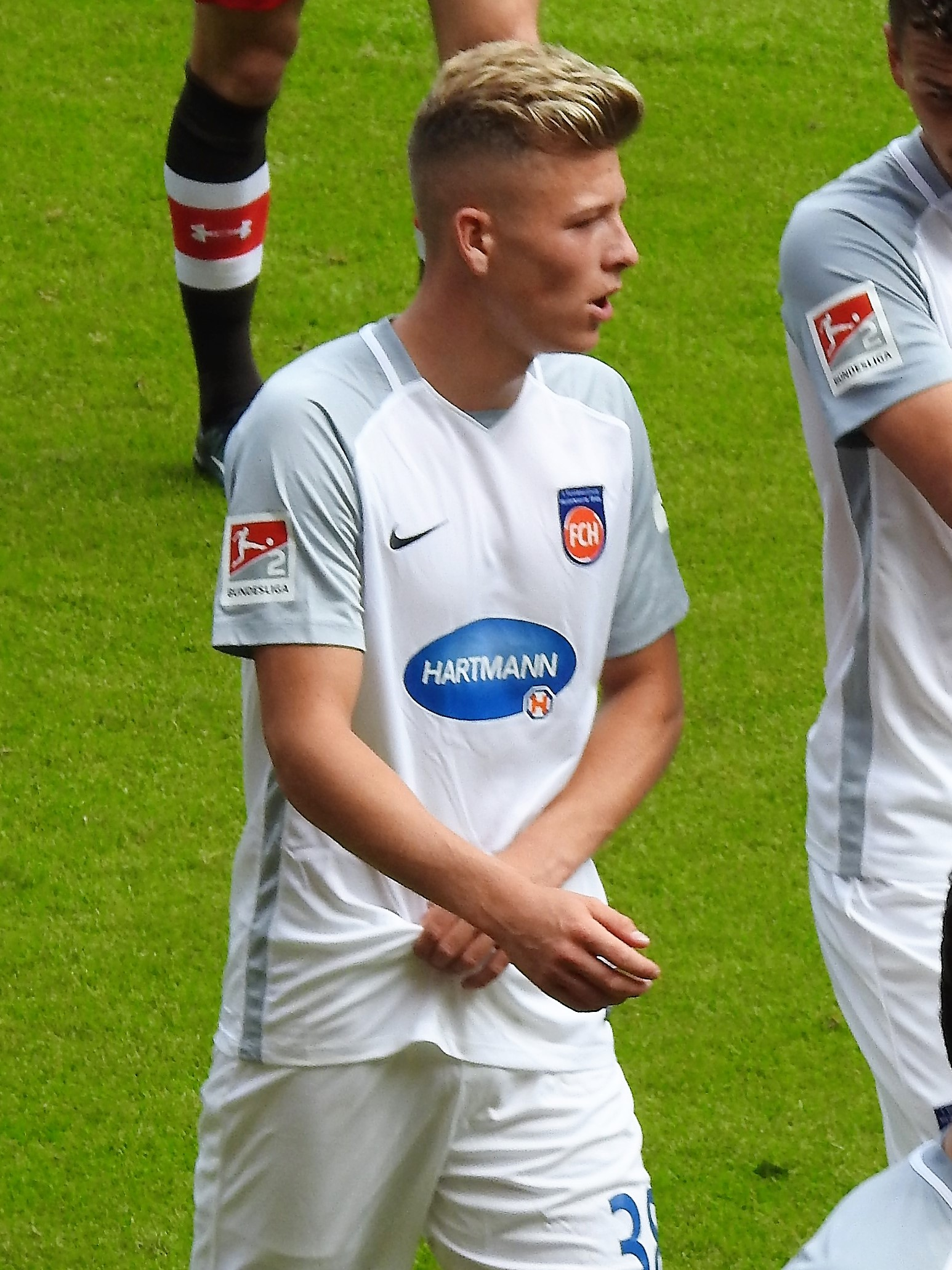
- Skarke playing for 1. FC Heidenheim in 2017

Personal information
- Date of birth: 7 September 1996 (age 30)
- Place of birth: Heidenheim, Germany
- Height: 1.81 m (5 ft 11 in)
- Position: Midfielder

Team information
- Current team: Union Berlin
- Number: 21

Youth career
- –2008: TSG Nattheim
- 2008–2015: 1. FC Heidenheim

Senior career*
Years	Team	Apps	(Gls)
2015–2019	1. FC Heidenheim	62	(4)
2019–2022	Darmstadt 98	76	(12)
2022–	Union Berlin	66	(2)
2023	→ Schalke 04 (loan)	9	(1)
2023–2024	→ Darmstadt 98 (loan)	30	(8)

International career
2017	Germany U21	1	(0)
- * Club domestic league appearances and goals as of 1 November 2026

Tim Skarke (born 7 September 1996) is a German professional footballer who plays as a midfielder for Bundesliga club Union Berlin.

== Club career ==
Skarke is a youth graduate from 1. FC Heidenheim. On 27 September 2015, he made his 2. Bundesliga debut in a 1–1 draw against Karlsruher SC.

On 31 May 2019, it was confirmed that Skarke would join SV Darmstadt 98 for the upcoming season.

On 31 May 2022, Skarke signed a contract with Union Berlin.

On 23 January 2023, he agreed to join Schalke 04 until the end of the season, with an option to make the deal permanent.

On 31 August 2023, Skarke returned to Darmstadt 98 on loan.

== Career statistics ==
As of match played 1 November 2026.

Appearances and goals by club, season and competition
Club	Season	League			Cup		Europe		Total	
Club	Season	Division	Apps	Goals	Apps	Goals	Apps	Goals	Apps	Goals
1. FC Heidenheim	2015–16	2. Bundesliga	11	1	3	0	—		14	1
1. FC Heidenheim	2016–17	2. Bundesliga	25	2	1	0	—		26	2
1. FC Heidenheim	2017–18	2. Bundesliga	13	1	2	0	—		15	1
1. FC Heidenheim	2018–19	2. Bundesliga	13	0	2	0	—		15	0
1. FC Heidenheim	Total		62	4	8	0	—		70	4
Darmstadt 98	2019–20	2. Bundesliga	27	2	2	1	—		29	3
Darmstadt 98	2020–21	2. Bundesliga	30	5	3	0	—		33	5
Darmstadt 98	2021–22	2. Bundesliga	19	5	0	0	—		19	5
Darmstadt 98	Total		76	12	5	1	—		81	13
Union Berlin	2022–23	Bundesliga	3	0	1	0	2 (Note: Appearances in the UEFA Europa League)	0	6	0
Union Berlin	2024–25	Bundesliga	33	0	2	0	—		35	0
Union Berlin	2025–26	Bundesliga	22	1	2	0	—		24	1
Union Berlin	2026–27	Bundesliga	8	1	1	0	—		9	1
Union Berlin	Total		66	2	6	0	2	0	74	2
Schalke 04 (loan)	2022–23	Bundesliga	9	1	—		—		9	1
Darmstadt 98 (loan)	2023–24	Bundesliga	30	8	—		—		30	8
Career total			243	27	19	1	2	0	264	28
