= Steve Kroll =

German footballer (born 1997)

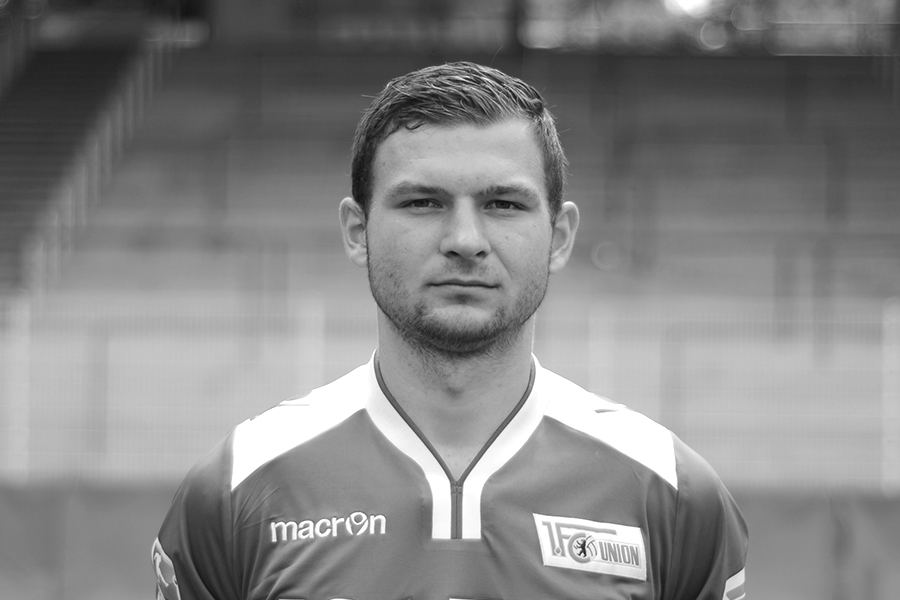
- Kroll in 2015

Personal information
- Full name: Steve Kroll
- Date of birth: 7 May 1997 (age 29)
- Place of birth: Berlin, Germany
- Height: 1.91 m (6 ft 3 in)
- Position: Goalkeeper

Youth career
- 2001–2004: RSV Waltersdorf
- 2004–2008: Lichtenrader BC
- 2008–2016: Union Berlin

Senior career*
Years	Team	Apps	(Gls)
2014–2017	Union Berlin	0	(0)
2014–2015	Union Berlin II	23	(0)
2016–2017	→ Wormatia Worms (loan)	5	(0)
2016–2017	→ Wormatia Worms II (loan)	10	(0)
2017–2018	Wormatia Worms	28	(0)
2017	Wormatia Worms II	1	(0)
2018–2019	Sportfreunde Lotte	38	(0)
2019–2021	SpVgg Unterhaching	6	(0)
2021–2023	Darmstadt 98	0	(0)
- * Club domestic league appearances and goals as of 1 July 2023

Steve Kroll (born 7 May 1997) is a German professional footballer who plays as a goalkeeper.
