= Luca Pfeiffer =

German footballer (born 1996)

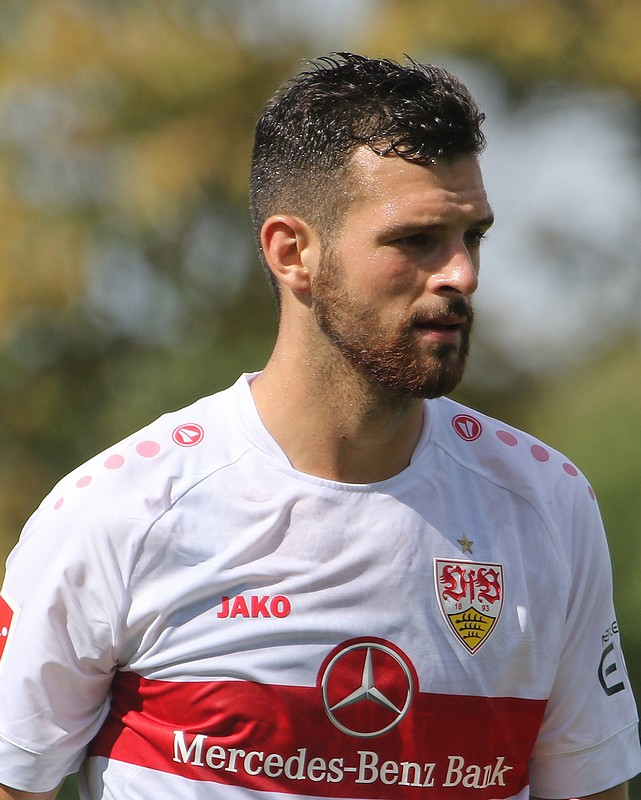
- Pfeiffer with VfB Stuttgart in 2022

Personal information
- Date of birth: 20 August 1996 (age 30)
- Place of birth: Bad Mergentheim, Germany
- Height: 1.96 m (6 ft 5 in)
- Position: Forward

Team information
- Current team: SV Elversberg
- Number: 16

Youth career
- VfR Gommersdorf
- FSV Hollenbach
- –2013: TSG Hoffenheim

Senior career*
Years	Team	Apps	(Gls)
2013–2016	FSV Hollenbach	80	(32)
2016–2018	Stuttgarter Kickers	43	(13)
2018–2019	SC Paderborn	0	(0)
2018–2019	→ VfL Osnabrück (loan)	21	(2)
2019–2020	Würzburger Kickers	36	(15)
2020–2022	Midtjylland	11	(1)
2021–2022	→ Darmstadt 98 (loan)	32	(17)
2022–2025	VfB Stuttgart	19	(0)
2023–2024	→ Darmstadt 98 (loan)	24	(1)
2024–2025	→ Karlsruher SC (loan)	16	(0)
2025–	SV Elversberg	2	(0)
- * Club domestic league appearances and goals as of 18 May 2026

Luca Pfeiffer (born 20 August 1996) is a German professional footballer who plays as a forward for Bundesliga club SV Elversberg.

== Career ==
In the 2019–20 season Pfeiffer contributed 15 goals as Würzburger Kickers were promoted to the 2. Bundesliga.

On 5 October 2020, the last day of the 2020 summer transfer window, Pfeiffer joined Danish Superliga champions FC Midtjylland on a deal until June 2024. The transfer fee paid to Würzburger Kickers was reported as €1.5 million.

In July 2021, Pfeiffer joined Darmstadt 98 on loan for the 2021–22 season.

On 2 August 2022, Pfeiffer joined VfB Stuttgart on a four-year contract. On 17 August 2023, Pfeiffer returned to Darmstadt 98 on a season-long loan. On 27 August 2024, he was loaned to Karlsruher SC for the 2024–25 season.

On 28 May 2025, Pfeiffer signed a contract with SV Elversberg, committing to the club until 2028.

== Career statistics ==
As of match played 26 April 2026

Appearances and goals by club, season and competition
Club	Season	League			National cup (Note: Includes DFB-Pokal, Danish Cup)		Europe		Other		Total	
Club	Season	Division	Apps	Goals	Apps	Goals	Apps	Goals	Apps	Goals	Apps	Goals
FSV Hollenbach	2014–15	Oberliga Baden-Württemberg	27	8	—		—		—		27	8
FSV Hollenbach	2015–16	Oberliga Baden-Württemberg	34	17	—		—		—		34	17
FSV Hollenbach	Total		61	25	—		—		—		61	25
Stuttgarter Kickers	2016–17	Regionalliga Südwest	33	9	—		—		—		33	9
Stuttgarter Kickers	2017–18	Regionalliga Südwest	10	4	—		—		—		10	4
Stuttgarter Kickers	Total		43	13	—		—		—		43	13
VfL Osnabrück (loan)	2018–19	3. Liga	21	2	—		—		—		21	2
Würzburger Kickers	2019–20	3. Liga	34	15	1	1	—		—		35	16
Würzburger Kickers	2020–21	2. Bundesliga	2	0	1	0	—		—		3	0
Würzburger Kickers	Total		36	15	2	1	—		—		38	16
Midtjylland	2020–21	Danish Superliga	11	1	2	1	3 (Note: Appearances in UEFA Champions League)	0	—		16	2
Midtjylland	2022–23	Danish Superliga	0	0	0	0	0	0	0	0	0	0
Midtjylland	Total		11	1	2	1	3	0	0	0	16	2
Darmstadt 98 (loan)	2021–22	2. Bundesliga	32	17	1	1	—		—		33	18
VfB Stuttgart	2022–23	Bundesliga	19	0	3	2	—		2 (Note: Appearances in Bundesliga relegation play-offs)	0	24	2
Darmstadt 98 (loan)	2023–24	Bundesliga	24	1	0	0	—		—		24	1
Karlsruher SC (loan)	2024–25	2. Bundesliga	16	0	1	0	—		—		17	0
SV Elversberg II	2025–26	Saarlandliga	1	1	—		—		—		1	1
SV Elversberg	2025–26	2. Bundesliga	2	0	0	0	—		—		2	0
Career total			266	75	9	5	3	0	2	0	280	80
