= John Peter Sesay =

Sierra Leonean footballer

Personal information
- Date of birth: 8 May 2003 (age 23)
- Place of birth: Freetown, Sierra Leone
- Height: 1.75 m (5 ft 9 in)
- Position: Midfielder

Team information
- Current team: SK Bischofshofen

Youth career
- 2016–2017: SV Niederursel
- 2017–2018: Rot-Weiss Frankfurt
- 2018–2021: Darmstadt 98

Senior career*
Years	Team	Apps	(Gls)
2021–2024	Darmstadt 98	2	(0)
2022–2023	→ Rot-Weiß Koblenz (loan)	12	(2)
2023–2024	→ UT Pétange (loan)	11	(0)
2024–	SK Bischofshofen	0	(0)
- * Club domestic league appearances and goals as of 1 June 2024

John Peter Sesay (born 8 May 2003) is a Sierra Leonean footballer who plays as a midfielder for Austrian third-tier Regionalliga club SK Bischofshofen.

== Career ==
Sesay was born in Freetown. After playing youth football for SV Niederursel, Rot-Weiss Frankfurt and Darmstadt 98, Sesay made his senior debut on 24 July 2021 as a substitute in a 2–0 2. Bundesliga defeat to Jahn Regensburg.

On 4 August 2022, Sesay joined Rot-Weiß Koblenz on loan.

On 21 July 2023, Sesay joined UT Pétange from Luxembourg on loan.
