= Philipp Sonn =

German footballer

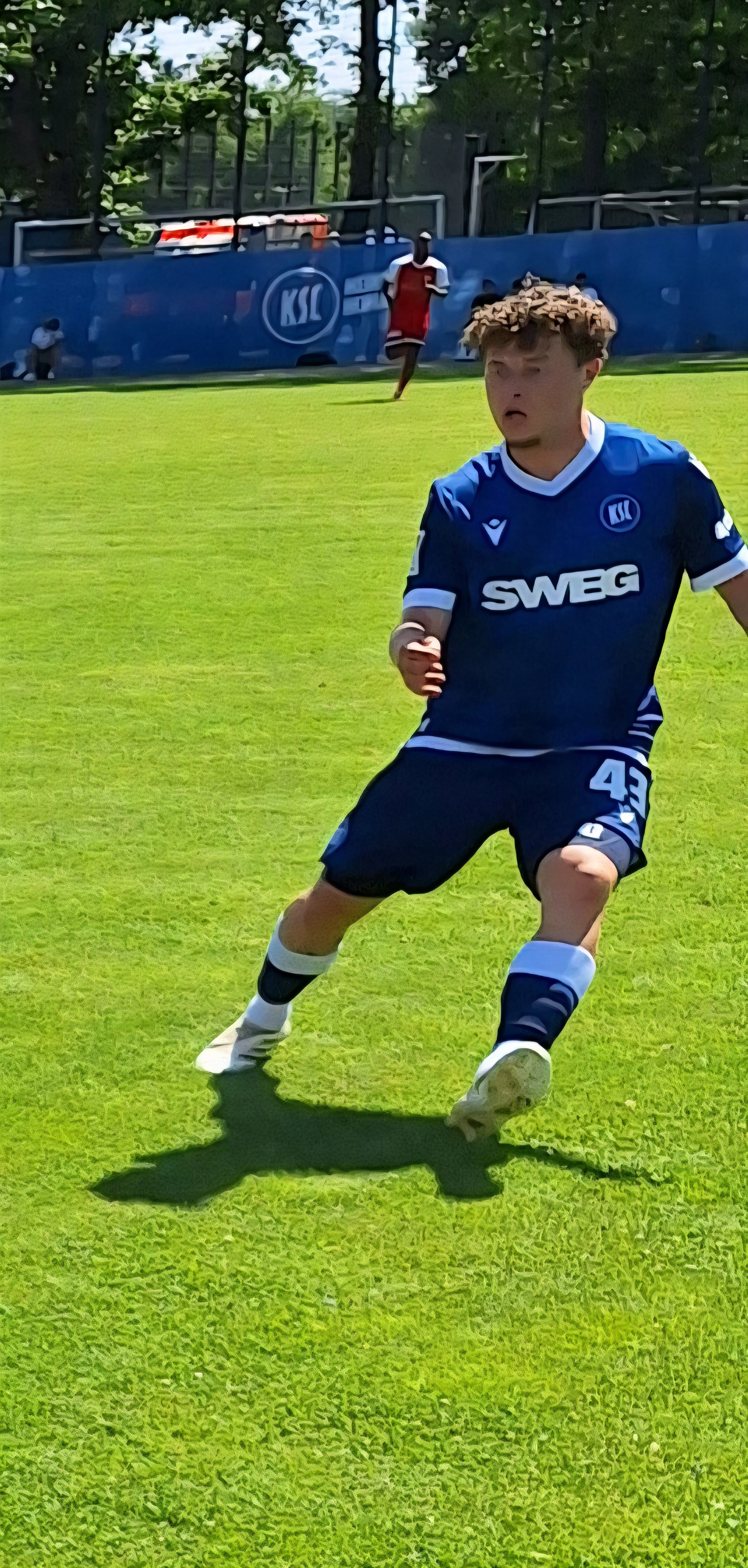
- Sonn in 2025

Personal information
- Date of birth: 11 September 2004 (age 22)
- Height: 1.71 m (5 ft 7 in)
- Positions: Left-back; midfielder

Team information
- Current team: Karlsruher SC II
- Number: 22

Youth career
- 2018–2021: Darmstadt 98

Senior career*
Years	Team	Apps	(Gls)
2021–2023	Darmstadt 98	1	(0)
2023–2024	Wormatia Worms	34	(0)
2024–2025	Bahlinger SC	26	(1)
2025–	Karlsruher SC II	18	(1)
- * Club domestic league appearances and goals as of 14:02, 20 December 2025 (UTC)

Philipp Sonn (born 11 September 2004) is a German footballer who plays as a left-back and midfielder for Karlsruher SC II.
