= 2011–12 1. FSV Mainz 05 season =

1. FSV Mainz 05
2011–12 season
- Manager: Thomas Tuchel
- Bundesliga: 13th
- DFB-Pokal: Third round
- Europa League: Third qualifying round
- Top goalscorer: League: Andreas Ivanschitz (5); All: Andreas Ivanschitz (6)
Home colours	Away colours	Third colours

The 2011–12 1. FSV Mainz 05 season is the club's 106th year of existence. They participated in the Bundesliga, DFB-Pokal and the UEFA Europa League.

== Review and events ==
On 19 November, the match against Mainz 05 was cancelled after the referee for the match, Babak Rafati, attempted suicide. The match was eventually rescheduled for 13 December.

Mainz 05 were eliminated from the DFB-Pokal by Holstein Kiel.

For the winter break, Mainz 05 returned to practice on 3 January 2012 at 10:00 CET (UTC+01) and had training camp in Llucmajor, Mallorca, Spain, from 6 January to 12 January.

== Match results ==
=== Bundesliga ===
7 August 2011 1	Mainz 05	2–0	Bayer Leverkusen	Mainz
15:30 CEST (UTC+02)	Svensson (yellow card) 27'; Allagui 32'; Polanski (yellow card) 66'; Bungert (yellow card) 74'; Toprak 86' (o.g.)	Match Report	Augusto (yellow card) 43'; Bender (yellow card) 84's	Stadium: Coface Arena; Attendance: 32,443; Referee: Michael Weiner (Ottenstein)

13 August 2011 2	SC Freiburg	1–2	Mainz 05	Freiburg
15:30 CEST	Cissé 90+1'	Match Report	Choupo-Moting (yellow card) 50', (goal) 79'; Risse 64', (yellow card) 90+3'	Stadium: badenova-Stadion; Attendance: 20,600; Referee: Thorsten Kinhöfer (Herne)

21 August 2011 3	Mainz 05	2–4	Schalke 04	Mainz
15:30 CEST	Ivanschitz 7'; Soto 12'	Match Report	Papadopoulos (yellow card) 5'; Huntelaar 57'; Höwedes 64'; Matip 81'; Fuchs 90'	Stadium: Coface Arena; Attendance: 33,500; Referee: Günter Perl (Pullach)

28 August 2011 4	Hannover 96	1–1	Mainz 05	Hanover
15:30 CEST	Abdellaoue 30'; Schmiedebach (yellow card) 90+2'; Stindl (yellow card) 90+3'	Match Report	Allagui 2'	Stadium: AWD-Arena; Attendance: 40,420; Referee: Deniz Aytekin (Oberasbach)

10 September 2011 5	Mainz 05	0–4	1899 Hoffenheim	Mainz
15:30 CEST		Match Report	Firmino 16'; Babel 45+2' (pen.), 74'; Noveski 85' (o.g.)	Stadium: Coface Arena; Attendance: 31,500; Referee: Guido Winkmann (Kerken)

17 September 2011 6	1. FC Kaiserslautern	3–1	Mainz 05	Kaiserslautern
18:30 CEST	Svensson 24' (o.g.); Shechter 54'; Tiffert 73'	Match Report	Choupo-Moting 15'; Ivanschitz (yellow card) 75'; Kirchhoff (yellow card) 78'	Stadium: Coface Arena; Attendance: 43,952; Referee: Wolfgang Stark (Ergolding)

24 September 2011 7	Mainz 05	1–2	Borussia Dortmund	Mainz
15:30 CEST	N. Müller 33'; Pospěch (yellow card) 90'	Match Report	Perišić 64'; Piszczek 90'	Stadium: Coface Arena; Attendance: 34,000; Referee: Michael Weiner (Giesen)

1 October 2011 8	1. FC Nürnberg	3–3	Mainz 05	Nuremberg
15:30 CEST	Feulner 6'; Mak 20'; Wollscheid (yellow card) 28'; Klose (yellow card) 58'; Pekhart 82'	Match Report	Bungert 32'; Choupo-Moting 45'; Ivanschitz 52'	Stadium: easyCredit-Stadion; Attendance: 38,107; Referee: Peter Gagelmann (Bremen)

15 October 2011 9	Mainz 05	0–1	FC Augsburg	Mainz
15:30 CEST	Noveski (yellow card) 58'; Ujah (yellow card) 83'; Svensson (yellow card) 87'		Möhrle (yellow card) 57'; Callsen-Bracker 82' (pen.); Bellinghausen (yellow card) 90+3'	Stadium: Coface Arena; Attendance: 30,195; Referee: Marco Fritz (Korb)

22 October 2011 10	Hertha BSC	0–0	Mainz 05	Berlin
15:30 CEST	Niemeyer (yellow card) 80'	Match Report	Allagui (yellow card) 79'; Kirchhoff (yellow card) 80'; Choupo-Moting (yellow card) 90'	Stadium: Olympic Stadium; Attendance: 47,064; Referee: Wolfgang Stark (Ergolding)

29 October 2011 11	Mainz 05	1–3	Werder Bremen	Mainz
18:30 CEST	Kirchhoff (yellow card) 6'; Bungert 23'; Soto (yellow card) 89'	Match Report	Pizarro 29', (yellow card) 76'; Hunt 47'; Ignjovski (yellow card) 50'; Wagner (yellow card) 76'; Prödl 78'; Schmitz (yellow card) 89'	Stadium: Coface Arena; Attendance: 34.000; Referee: Deniz Aytekin (Oberasbach)

4 November 2011 12	Mainz 05	3–1	VfB Stuttgart	Mainz
20:30 CET	N. Müller (yellow card) 48'; Ujah 53', 64'; Ivanschitz 60' (pen.), (yellow card) 61'; Polanski (red card) 83'	Match Report	Okazaki (yellow card) 14'; Cacau 50'; Ulreich (yellow card) 60'; Rodríguez (yellow card) 67' (yellow-red card) 90+4'	Stadium: Coface Arena; Attendance: 34,000; Referee: Guido Winkmann (Kerken)

27 November 2011 13	Mainz 05	3–2	Bayern Munich	Mainz
17:30 CET	Ivanschitz 11'; Baumgartlinger (yellow card) 23'; Bungert (yellow card) 59', (goal) 74'; Caligiuri 65'; Wetklo (yellow card) 84'	Match Report	Luiz Gustavo (yellow card) 50'; Van Buyten 56', 79'; Gómez (yellow card) 67'	Stadium: Coface Arena; Attendance: 34,000; Referee: Knut Kircher (Rottenburg

3 December 2011 14	VfL Wolfsburg	2–2	Mainz 05	Wolfsburg
15:30 CET	Mandžukić 10'; Kirchhoff 41' (o.g.); Benaglio (yellow card) 69'; Hasebe (yellow card) 76' (yellow-red card) 85'	Match Report	Allagui (yellow card) 37'; Ivanschitz 70' (pen.); Choupo-Moting 81'	Stadium: Volkswagen Arena; Attendance: 24,321; Referee: Peter Sippel (Munich)

10 December 2011 15	Mainz 05	0–0	Hamburger SV	Mainz
17:30 CET	Pospěch (yellow card) 36'	Match Report		Stadium: Coface Arena; Attendance: 34,000; Referee: Robert Hartmann (Wangen)

13 December 2011 16	1. FC Köln	1–1	Mainz 05	Cologne
20:30 CET	Jemal (yellow card) 29'; Podolski 85'; Brečko (yellow card) 88'	Match Report	Gavranović (yellow card) 16'; Svensson (yellow card) 24'; Allagui (yellow card) 48', (goal) 70'; Baumgartlinger (yellow card) 62'	Stadium: RheinEnergieStadion; Attendance: 44,800; Referee: Felix Zwayer (Berlin)

18 December 2011 17	Borussia Mönchengladbach	1–0	Mainz 05	Mönchengladbach
17:30 CET	Nordtveit (yellow card) 45+1'; Dante (yellow card) 46'; Herrmann 5', (yellow card) 86'	Match Report	Pospěch (yellow card) 85'; Allagui (yellow card) 90'; Bungert (yellow card) 90+3'	Stadium: Borussia-Park; Attendance: 49,089; Referee: Peter Gagelmann (Bremen); Man of the Match: Herrmann

22 January 2012 18	Bayer Leverkusen	3–2	Mainz 05	Leverkusen
17:30 CET	Pospěch 10' (o.g.); Friedrich (yellow card) 32', (goal) 35'; Bender 70'	Match Report	Polanski 50'; Caligiuri 53'	Stadium: BayArena; Attendance: 24,365; Referee: Michael Weiner (Giesen)

29 January 2012 19	Mainz 05	3–1	SC Freiburg	Mainz
17:30 CET	Choupo-Moting 3', 17'; Polanski 6' (pen.); Noveski (yellow card) 59'; Bungert (yellow card) 69'	Match Report	Diagne (red card) 4'; Ginter (yellow card) 52'; Krmaš 68'; Schmid (yellow card) 78'	Stadium: Coface Arena; Attendance: 30,938; Referee: Markus Schmidt (Stuttgart)

4 February 2012 20	Schalke 04	1–1	Mainz 05	Gelsenkirchen
15:30 CET	Obasi (yellow card) 13', (goal) 59'; Fuchs (yellow card) 90+2'	Match Report	Zidan 15'; Kirchhoff (yellow card) 41'; Pospěch (yellow card) 77'	Stadium: Veltins-Arena; Attendance: 60,557; Referee: Deniz Aytekin (Oberasbach)

11 February 2012 21	Mainz 05	1–1	Hannover 96	Mainz
15:30 CET	Zidan 7'; Bungert (yellow card) 18'; Szalai (yellow card) 39'; Wetklo (yellow card) 90+3'	Match Report	Stindl (yellow card) 17'; Pinto (yellow card) 77'; Sobiech 90'; Schlaudraff (yellow card) 90+2'	Stadium: Coface Arena; Attendance: 30,173; Referee: Felix Zwayer (Berlin)

17 February 2012 22	1899 Hoffenheim	1–1	Mainz 05	Sinsheim
20:30 CET	Noveski 9' (o.g.)	Match Report	Zidan 29'; Zabavník (yellow card) 81'	Stadium: Rhein-Neckar-Arena; Attendance: 24,300; Referee: Tobias Stieler (Obertshausen)

25 February 2012 23	Mainz 05	4–0	1. FC Kaiserslautern	Mainz
15:30 CET	Zidan 2'; Szalai 17'; N. Müller 30'; Choupo-Moting 74'; Kirchhoff (yellow card) 81'	Report	Dick (yellow card) 44'; Derstroff (yellow card) 60'; Jørgensen (yellow card) 68'	Stadium: Coface Arena; Attendance: 34,000; Referee: Knut Kircher

3 March 2012 24	Borussia Dortmund	2–1	Mainz 05	Dortmund
18:30 CET	Błaszczykowski 26'; Kagawa 77'	Report	Zidan 74'	Stadium: Signal Iduna Park; Attendance: 80,720; Referee: Peter Gagelmann

10 March 2012 25	Mainz 05	2–1	1. FC Nürnberg	Mainz
15:30 CET	N. Müller 2'; Szalai (yellow card) 6' (yellow-red card) 84'; Zidan 22'	Report	Balitsch (yellow card) 4'; Hloušek (yellow card) 34'; Wollscheid (yellow card) 57'; Schäfer (yellow card) 62'; Didavi 64'; Feulner (yellow card) 71'	Stadium: Coface Arena; Attendance: 34,000; Referee: Thorsten Kinhöfer

17 March 2012 26	FC Augsburg	2–1	Mainz 05	Augsburg
15:30 CET	Koo 43'; Langkamp 51'; Hosogai (yellow card) 71'; Bellinghausen (yellow card) 83'	Report	Allagui 36'; Zabavník (yellow card) 63'; Wetklo (yellow card) 90+1'	Stadium: Augsburg Arena; Attendance: 30,025; Referee: Michael Weiner

24 March 2012 27	Mainz 05	1–3	Hertha BSC	Mainz
15:30 CET	Choupo-Moting 58'; Kirchhoff (yellow card) 73'	Report	Ben-Hatira 41'; Ramos 52', 69'; Lell (yellow card) 88'	Stadium: Coface Arena; Attendance: 33,152; Referee: Peter Sippel

31 March 2012 28	Werder Bremen	0–3	Mainz 05	Bremen
15:30 CET	Fritz (yellow card) 54'	Report	Szalai 18'; Choupo-Moting 48', 74'; Zabavník (yellow card) 62'; Soto (yellow card) 63'	Stadium: Weserstadion; Attendance: 40,132; Referee: Knut Kircher

7 April 2012 29	VfB Stuttgart	4–1	Mainz 05	Stuttgart
15:30 CEST	Hajnal 8'; Ibišević 49', 85'; Kuzmanović 65' (pen.); Okazaki (yellow card) 89'	Report	Ivanschitz 3' (pen.); Polanski (yellow card) 65'	Stadium: Mercedes-Benz Arena; Attendance: 55,100; Referee: Manuel Gräfe

10 April 2012 30	Mainz 05	4–0	1. FC Köln	Mainz
20:00 CEST	Polanski 19' (pen.); Zidan 31'; N. Müller 37'; Szalai 54', (yellow card) 54'; Choupo-Moting (yellow card) 82'	Report		Stadium: Coface Arena; Attendance: 34,000; Referee: Felix Brych

14 April 2012 31	Bayern Munich	0–0	Mainz 05	Munich
18:30 CEST	Badstuber (yellow card) 23'	Report	N. Müller (yellow card) 62'	Stadium: Allianz Arena; Attendance: 69,000; Referee: Markus Schmidt

20 April 2012 32	Mainz 05	0–0	VfL Wolfsburg	Mainz
20:30 CEST		Report	Madlung (yellow card) 21'	Stadium: Coface Arena; Attendance: 31,069; Referee: Robert Hartmann

28 April 2012 33	Hamburger SV	0–0	Mainz 05	Hamburg
15:30 CEST		Report	Caligiuri (yellow card) 38'	Stadium: Imtech Arena; Attendance: 56,537; Referee: Florian Meyer

5 May 2012 34	Mainz 05	0–3	Borussia Mönchengladbach	Mainz
15:30 CEST		Report	Reus 31', 62'; De Camargo 69'	Stadium: Coface Arena; Attendance: 34,000; Referee: Wolfgang Stark

=== DFB-Pokal ===
31 July 2011 First round	SVN Zweibrücken	1–2 (a.e.t.)	Mainz 05	Homburg
17:30 CEST	Dausend (yellow card) 35'; Ellermann (yellow card) 73'; Nazarov (yellow card) 84'; Maul 116'	Match Report	Zabavník (yellow card) 88' (yellow-red card) 88'; Slišković 95'; Allagui 115'	Stadium: Waldstadion Homburg; Attendance: 7,165; Referee: Harm Osmers (Hanover)

26 October 2011 Second round	Hannover 96	0–1 (a.e.t.)	Mainz 05	Hanover
19:00 CEST	Cherundolo (yellow card) 93'; Pinto (yellow card) 115'	Match Report	Ivanschitz 93', (yellow card) 104'	Stadium: AWD-Arena; Attendance: 30,100; Referee: Felix Brych (Munich)

21 December 2011 Round of 16	Holstein Kiel	2–0	Mainz 05	Kiel
19:00 CET	Ujah 6' (o.g.); Heider (yellow card) 43'; S. Müller 64'	Match Report		Stadium: Holstein-Stadion; Attendance: 10.649; Referee: Günter Perl (Pullach)

=== UEFA Europa League ===
28 July 2011 3QR-1st Leg	Mainz 05	1–1	Gaz Metan Mediaș	Mainz, Germany
20:30 CEST	Bungert 31'; Pospěch (yellow card) 66'; Svensson (yellow card) 90+6'	Match Report	Todea (yellow card) 29'; Hoban (yellow card) 42'; Bawab 60', (yellow card) 81'; Khubutia (yellow card) 90'	Stadium: Coface Arena; Attendance: 15,800; Referee: Steven McLean (Scotland)

4 August 2011 3QR-2nd Leg	Gaz Metan Mediaș	1–1 (a.e.t.) (2–2 agg.) (4–3 p)	Mainz 05	Mediaș, Romania
19:00 CEST	Buzean (yellow card) 49'; Bawab 62'; Trtovac (yellow card) 64'; Pleșca (yellow card) 111'	Match Report	Baumgartlinger (yellow card) 24'; Risse 31'; Polanski (yellow card) 144'	Stadium: Stadionul Gaz Metan; Attendance: 6,000; Referee: Tamás Bognár (Hungary)

== Player information ==
=== Roster and statistics ===
As of 16 December 2011

Squad Season 2011-12
Player					Bundesliga		DFB-Pokal		Europa League		Totals	
Player	Nat.	Date of birth (age) (Note: Age as of 7 August 2011.)	at Mainz since	Previous club	Matches	Goals	Matches	Goal	Matches	Goals	Matches	Goals
Goalkeepers
Heinz Müller	GER	30 May 1978 (aged 33)	2009	Barnsley	10	0	0	0	1	0	11	0
Christian Wetklo	GER	11 April 1980 (aged 31)	2000	Rot-Weiss Essen	3	0	2	0	1	0	6	0
Loris Karius	GER	22 June 1993 (aged 18)	2011	Manchester City	0	0	0	0	0	0	0	0
Defenders
Niko Bungert	GER	24 October 1986 (aged 24)	2008	Kickers Offenbach	15	3	2	0	2	1	19	4
Malik Fathi	GER	29 October 1983 (aged 27)	2010	Spartak Moscow	12	0	2	0	0	0	14	0
Eugen Gopko	GER	5 January 1991 (aged 20)	2006	TuS Neuhausen	0	0	0	0	0	0	0	0
Jan Kirchhoff	GER	1 October 1990 (aged 20)	2007	Eintracht Frankfurt	13	0	2	0	0	0	15	0
Nikolče Noveski	MKD	28 April 1979 (aged 32)	2004	Erzgebirge Aue	11	0	1	0	2	0	14	0
Zdeněk Pospěch	CZE	14 December 1978 (aged 32)	2011	Copenhagen	14	0	1	0	2	0	17	0
Fabian Schönheim	GER	14 February 1987 (aged 24)	2011	Wehen Wiesbaden	1	0	0	0	0	0	1	0
Bo Svensson	DEN	4 August 1979 (aged 32)	2007	Borussia Mönchengladbach	7	0	1	0	2	0	10	0
Radoslav Zabavník	SVK	16 September 1980 (aged 30)	2010	Terek Grozny	0	0	1	0	0	0	1	0
Midfielders
Julian Baumgartlinger	AUT	2 January 1988 (aged 23)	2011	Austria Wien	11	0	2	0	1	0	14	0
Marco Caligiuri	GER	14 April 1984 (aged 27)	2010	Greuther Fürth	14	1	1	0	1	0	16	1
Florian Heller	GER	10 March 1982 (aged 29)	2008	Erzgebirge Aue	0	0	0	0	0	0	0	0
Andreas Ivanschitz	AUT	15 October 1983 (aged 27)	2009	Panathinaikos	14	5	1	1	2	0	17	6
Yunus Mallı	GER	24 February 1992 (aged 19)	2011	Borussia Mönchengladbach	5	0	1	0	0	0	6	0
Nicolai Müller	GER	24 February 1992 (aged 19)	2011	Greuther Fürth	10	1	0	0	0	0	10	1
Eugen Polanski	POL	17 March 1986 (aged 25)	2009	Getafe	8	0	0	0	2	0	10	0
Marcel Risse	GER	17 December 1989 (aged 21)	2010	Bayer Leverkusen	10	1	2	0	2	1	14	2
Elkin Soto	COL	4 August 1980 (aged 31)	2007	Guayaquil	14	1	2	0	2	0	18	1
Zoltán Stieber	HUN	16 October 1988 (aged 22)	2011	Alemannia Aachen	6	0	1	0	1	0	8	0
Forwards
Sami Allagui	GER	28 May 1986 (aged 25)	2010	Greuther Fürth	13	3	1	1	2	0	16	4
Eric Maxim Choupo-Moting	CMR	16 October 1988 (aged 22)	2011	Hamburger SV	16	4	2	0	1	0	19	0
Mario Gavranović	SUI	22 November 1989 (aged 21)	2011	Schalke 04	4	0	1	2	1	0	6	2
Shawn Parker	GER	7 March 1993 (aged 18)	2005	Wehen Wiesbaden	0	0	0	0	0	0	0	0
Ádám Szalai	HUN	9 December 1987 (aged 23)	2010	Real Madrid	12	3	0	0	0	0	12	3
Anthony Ujah	NGA	14 October 1990 (aged 20)	2011	Lillestrøm	8	2	1	0	2	0	11	2
Deniz Yılmaz	GER	26 February 1988 (aged 23)	2011	Bayern Munich	0	0	0	0	0	0	0	0
