= 2010–11 1. FSV Mainz 05 season =

Mainz 05
2010–11 season
- President: Harald Strutz
- Manager: Thomas Tuchel
- Bundesliga: 5th
- DFB-Pokal: Second round
- Top goalscorer: League: André Schürrle (12); All: André Schürrle (12)
Home colours	Away colours

The 2010–11 1. FSV Mainz 05 season began on 15 August 2010 with a DFB-Pokal match against Berlin AK 07, and ended on 14 May 2011, the last matchday of the Bundesliga, with a match against FC St Pauli.

Mainz 05 finished fifth in the league table.

== Transfers ==
Source: Mainz 05.de

=== Summer transfers ===
In: Note: Flags indicate national team as defined under FIFA eligibility rules; some limited exceptions apply. Players may hold more than one non-FIFA nationality.

No.	Pos.	Nation	Player
1	GK	GER	Martin Pieckenhagen (from Heracles Almelo)
6	MF	GER	Marco Caligiuri (from Greuther Fürth)
9	FW	TUN	Sami Allagui (from Greuther Fürth)
11	FW	DEN	Morten Rasmussen (on loan from Celtic)
13	MF	GER	Marcel Risse (on loan from Bayer Leverkusen, previously on loan at 1. FC Nürnberg)
17	MF	NGR	Haruna Babangida (from Kuban Krasnodar)
18	MF	GER	Lewis Holtby (on loan from Schalke 04, previously on loan at VfL Bochum)
22	DF	AUT	Christian Fuchs (on loan from VfL Bochum)
28	FW	HUN	Ádám Szalai (from Real Madrid Castilla, previously on loan)
34	DF	GER	Stefan Bell (from Mainz 05 U-19)
36	FW	MKD	Dragan Georgiev (on loan from Turnovo)

Out: Note: Flags indicate national team as defined under FIFA eligibility rules; some limited exceptions apply. Players may hold more than one non-FIFA nationality.

No.	Pos.	Nation	Player
1	GK	GER	Dimo Wache (retired)
6	DF	GER	Tim Hoogland (to Schalke 04)
11	FW	CZE	Filip Trojan (on loan to MSV Duisburg)
17	DF	GER	Marco Rose (to Mainz 05 II)
22	FW	ALG	Chadli Amri (to 1. FC Kaiserslautern)
22	MF	TUR	Tufan Tosunoğlu (to FSV Frankfurt)
23	FW	BFA	Aristide Bancé (to Al Ahli)
32	FW	MNE	Dragan Bogavac (released)
34	DF	GER	Stefan Bell (on loan to 1860 Munich)
36	FW	MKD	Dragan Georgiev (on loan to SC Paderborn)
--	MF	ALB	Jahmir Hyka (to Panionios)

=== Winter transfers ===
In: Note: Flags indicate national team as defined under FIFA eligibility rules; some limited exceptions apply. Players may hold more than one non-FIFA nationality.

No.	Pos.	Nation	Player
25	FW	AUT	Andreas Ivanschitz (from Panathinaikos, previously on loan)

Out: Note: Flags indicate national team as defined under FIFA eligibility rules; some limited exceptions apply. Players may hold more than one non-FIFA nationality.

No.	Pos.	Nation	Player
10	MF	CZE	Jan Šimák (released)
17	FW	NGR	Haruna Babangida (released)
--	FW	ECU	Félix Borja (to Puebla)

== Goals and appearances ==
No.	Pos	Nat	Player	Total		Bundesliga		DFB-Pokal	
No.	Pos	Nat	Player	Apps	Goals	Apps	Goals	Apps	Goals
1	GK	(Germany) GER	Martin Pieckenhagen	1	0	1	0	0	0
2	DF	(Denmark) DEN	Bo Svensson	20	0	18	0	2	0
3	DF	(Germany) GER	Malik Fathi	19	0	18	0	1	0
4	DF	(North Macedonia) MKD	Nikolče Noveski	33	2	31	2	2	0
5	MF	(Germany) GER	Eugen Gopko	1	0	1	0	0	0
6	MF	(Germany) GER	Marco Caligiuri	21	1	21	1	0	0
7	MF	(Germany) GER	Eugen Polanski	29	0	28	0	1	0
8	DF	(Slovakia) SVK	Radoslav Zabavník	21	0	20	0	1	0
9	FW	(Tunisia) TUN	Sami Allagui	29	9	27	9	2	0
10	MF	(Czech Republic) CZE	Jan Šimák	2	0	1	0	1	0
11	FW	(Denmark) DEN	Morten Rasmussen	5	2	5	2	0	0
14	FW	(Germany) GER	André Schürrle	33	14	32	14	1	0
15	DF	(Germany) GER	Jan Kirchhoff	9	0	9	0	0	0
16	MF	(Germany) GER	Florian Heller	19	1	18	1	1	0
17	MF	(Nigeria) NGR	Haruna Babangida	1	0	1	0	0	0
18	MF	(Germany) GER	Lewis Holtby	31	6	29	4	2	2
19	MF	(Colombia) COL	Elkin Soto	27	4	25	4	2	0
21	MF	(Slovakia) SVK	Miroslav Karhan	15	0	13	0	2	0
22	DF	(Austria) AUT	Christian Fuchs	33	0	31	0	2	0
23	MF	(Germany) GER	Marcel Risse	25	1	24	1	1	0
24	DF	(Hungary) HUN	Zsolt Lőw	0	0	0	0	0	0
25	MF	(Austria) AUT	Andreas Ivanschitz	20	2	18	2	2	0
26	DF	(Germany) GER	Niko Bungert	26	1	25	1	1	0
28	FW	(Hungary) HUN	Ádám Szalai	22	5	20	4	2	1
29	GK	(Germany) GER	Christian Wetklo	25	0	23	0	2	0
33	GK	(Germany) GER	Heinz Müller	10	0	10	0	0	0
35	FW	(Croatia) CRO	Petar Slišković	9	2	9	2	0	0

Last Updated: 11 May 2011 Source: bundesliga.de

== Results ==
=== Bundesliga ===
Win Draw Loss

Note: Results are given with 1. FSV Mainz 05 score listed first.

Game	Date	Venue	Opponent	Result F–A	Attendance	Mainz 05 Goalscorers
1	22 August 2010	H	VfB Stuttgart	2–0	20,300	Allagui 26', Rasmussen 47'
2	28 August 2010	A	VfL Wolfsburg	4–3	26,000	Rasmussen 39', Soto 48', Schürrle 58', Szalai 85'
3	12 September 2010	H	1. FC Kaiserslautern	2–1	20,300	Bungert 71', Schürrle 73'
4	17 September 2010	A	Werder Bremen	2–0	35,000	Risse 53', Schürrle 61'
5	21 September 2010	H	1. FC Köln	2–0	20,300	Holtby 72', 90+1'
6	25 September 2010	A	Bayern Munich	2–1	69,000	Allagui 15', Szalai 77'
7	2 October 2010	H	1899 Hoffenheim	4–2	20,300	Allagui 2', Szalai 47', Luiz Gustavo 59' (o.g.), Schürrle 74' (pen.)
8	16 October 2010	H	Hamburger SV	0–1	20,300
9	24 October 2010	A	Bayer Leverkusen	1–0	27,000	Ivanschitz 70'
10	30 October 2010	H	Borussia Dortmund	0–2	20,300
11	6 November 2010	A	SC Freiburg	0–1	22,400
12	13 November 2010	H	Hannover 96	0–1	20,000
13	20 November 2010	A	Borussia Mönchengladbach	3–0	45,472	Schürrle 64', Allagui 76', 88'
14	26 November 2010	H	1. FC Nürnberg	3–0	20,300	Schürrle 27', Noveski 54', Allagui 86'
15	4 December 2010	A	Eintracht Frankfurt	1–2	51,500	Schürrle 42' (pen.)
16	12 December 2010	H	Schalke 04	0–1	20,300
17	18 December 2010	A	FC St. Pauli	4–2	24,000	Schürrle 11', 28', Szalai 41', Caligiuri 83'
18	15 January 2011	A	VfB Stuttgart	0–1	33,500
19	22 January 2011	H	VfL Wolfsburg	0–1	18,900
20	29 January 2011	A	1. FC Kaiserslautern	1–0	46,649	Holtby 23'
21	5 February 2011	H	Werder Bremen	1–1	20,300	Schürrle 19'
22	13 February 2011	A	1. FC Köln	2–4	44,000	Allagui 31', Slišković 89'
23	19 February 2011	H	Bayern Munich	1–3	20,300	Allagui 84'
24	26 February 2011	A	1899 Hoffenheim	2–1	30,000	Ivanschitz 23', Soto 86'
25	6 March 2011	A	Hamburger SV	4–2	49,642	Schürrle 56', 82', Risse 61', Heller 88'
26	13 March 2011	H	Bayer Leverkusen	0–1	20,300
27	19 March 2011	A	Borussia Dortmund	1–1	80,720	Slišković 89'
28	2 April 2011	H	SC Freiburg	1–1	20,300	Allagui 74'
29	9 April 2011	A	Hannover 96	0–2	48,000
30	15 April 2011	H	Borussia Mönchengladbach	1–0	20,300	Schürrle 87'
31	24 April 2011	A	1. FC Nürnberg	0–0	48,548
32	30 April 2011	H	Eintracht Frankfurt	3–0	20,300	Ivanschitz 26', Soto 33', 44'
33	7 May 2011	A	Schalke 04	3–1	60,309	Schürrle 52', Holtby 82', Noveski 85'

=== DFB-Pokal ===
Win Draw Loss

Note: Results are given with 1. FSV Mainz 05 score listed first.

Game	Date	Venue	Opponent	Result F–A	Attendance	Mainz 05 Goalscorers
1	14 August 2009	A	Berlin AK 07	2–1	1,120	Holtby 38', 70'
2	27 November 2010	A	Alemannia Aachen	1–2	25,657	Szalai 68'

== Kits ==
Home	Home Alternate	Home Alt. 2	Away	Away Alternate
