= 2012–13 1. FSV Mainz 05 season =

Mainz 05
2012–13 season
- Manager: Thomas Tuchel
- Bundesliga: 13th
- DFB-Pokal: Quarter-finals
Home colours	Away colours	Third colours

The 2012–13 1. FSV Mainz 05 season is the 108th season in the club's football history. In 2012–13 the club plays in the Bundesliga, the top tier of German football. It is the club's fourth consecutive season in this league, having been promoted from the 2. Bundesliga at the conclusion of the 2008–09 season.

The club also takes part in the 2012–13 edition of the DFB-Pokal, the German Cup, where Mainz was eliminated in the quarter-final stage by fellow Bundesliga side SC Freiburg on 26 February 2013.

== Match Results ==
=== Legend ===
Win Draw Loss Postponed

=== Bundesliga ===
25 August 2012 1	SC Freiburg	1–1	Mainz 05	Freiburg
15:30 CEST (UTC+02:00)	Kruse 49'	Report (in German)	Ivanschitz 65' (pen.); N. Müller (yellow card) 86'; Kirchhoff (yellow card) 89'	Stadium: Mage Solar Stadion; Attendance: 22,500; Referee: Deniz Aytekin (Oberasbach)

31 August 2012 2	Mainz 05	0–1	SpVgg Greuther Fürth	Mainz
20:30 CEST (UTC+02:00)	Noveski (yellow card) 23'	Report (in German)	Peković (yellow card) 26'; Schmidtgal (yellow card) 34'; Klaus 66'; Azemi (yellow card) 90+2'	Stadium: Coface Arena; Attendance: 28,237; Referee: Tobias Stieler (Obertshausen)

15 September 2012 3	Bayern Munich	3–1	Mainz 05	Munich
15:30 CEST (UTC+02:00)	Mandžukić 2'; Schweinsteiger 13'; Luiz Gustavo (yellow card) 60'; Kroos 90+2'	Report (in German)	Kirchhoff (yellow card) 40'; Szalai 59' (pen.); Bungert (yellow card) 86'	Stadium: Allianz Arena; Attendance: 71,000; Referee: Markus Schmidt (Stuttgart)

22 September 2012 4	Mainz 05	2–0	FC Augsburg	Mainz
15:30 CEST (UTC+02:00)	Ivanschitz 10'; Szalai 25'	Report (in German)	Vogt (yellow card) 20'; De Jong (yellow card) 44'	Stadium: Coface Arena; Attendance: 28,463; Referee: Michael Weiner (Ottenstein)

25 September 2012 5	Schalke 04	3–0	Mainz 05	Gelsenkirchen
20:00 CEST (UTC+02:00)	Farfán 21' (pen.); Neustädter (yellow card) 51'; Draxler (yellow card) 77'; Holtby 81'; Pukki 89'	Report (in German)	Polanski (yellow card) 62'; Wetklo (yellow card) 64'	Stadium: Veltins-Arena; Attendance: 59,116; Referee: Robert Hartmann (Wangen)

30 September 2012 6	Wolfsburg	0–2	Mainz 05	Wolfsburg
17:30 CEST (UTC+02:00)	Josué (yellow card) 43'; Träsch (yellow card) 44'; Olić (yellow card) 52'	Report (in German)	Díaz 27'; Szalai 37'; Soto (yellow card) 54'; Baumgartlinger (yellow card) 77'; Caligiuri (yellow card) 79'	Stadium: Volkswagen-Arena; Attendance: 23,795; Referee: Marco Fritz (Korb)

6 October 2012 7	Mainz 05	1–0	Fortuna Düsseldorf	Mainz
15:30 CEST (UTC+02:00)	Noveski (yellow card) 23', (goal) 85'; Díaz (yellow card) 43'; Kirchhoff (yellow card) 52'; Baumgartlinger (yellow card) 57'	Report (in German)	Fink (yellow card) 22' (yellow-red card) 78'; Schahin (yellow card) 22'; Kruse (yellow card) 45'	Stadium: Coface Arena; Attendance: 31,577; Referee: Deniz Aytekin (Oberasbach)

20 October 2012 8	Bayer Leverkusen	2–2	Mainz 05	Leverkusen
15:30 CEST (UTC+02:00)	Bellarabi (yellow card) 23'; Kießling 43'; Rolfes (yellow card) 61'; Carvajal (yellow card) 66'; Castro 87'; Toprak (yellow card) 90+2'	Report (in German)	Svensson (yellow card) 18'; Wetklo (yellow card) 28'; Szalai 58'; Baumgartlinger (yellow card) 60'; Risse 76'	Stadium: BayArena; Attendance: 28,077; Referee: Peter Sippel (Munich)

27 October 2012 9	Mainz 05	3–0	1899 Hoffenheim	Mainz
15:30 CEST (UTC+02:00)	Szalai 21', 46', 64'; Baumgartlinger (yellow card) 34'	Report (in German)	Williams (yellow card) 68'; Rudy (yellow card) 69'	Stadium: Coface Arena; Attendance: 28,067; Referee: Guido Winkmann (Kerken)

4 November 2012 10	Werder Bremen	2–1	Mainz 05	Bremen
17:30 CET (UTC+01:00)	Hunt 10', 85'; De Bruyne (yellow card) 68'	Report (in German)	Kirchhoff (yellow card) 21'; Zabavník (yellow card) 55'; Szalai 64'	Stadium: Weserstadion; Attendance: 39,114; Referee: Manuel Gräfe (Berlin)

9 November 2012 11	Mainz 05	2–1	1. FC Nürnberg	Mainz
20:30 CET (UTC+01:00)	N. Müller 12'; Andreas Ivanschitz 21'; Díaz (yellow card) 35'; Soto (yellow card) 58'; Noveski (yellow card) 65'; Szalai (yellow card) 79'; Baumgartlinger (yellow card) 88'	Report (in German)	Nilsson (yellow card) 17', (goal) 40'; Plattenhardt (yellow card) 32'; Kiyotake (yellow card) 79'; Balitsch (yellow card) 85'; Simons (yellow card) 90+2'	Stadium: Coface Arena; Attendance: 31,390; Referee: Thorsten Kinhöfer (Herne)

17 November 2012 12	Hamburger SV	1–0	Mainz 05	Hamburg
15:30 CET (UTC+01:00)	Van der Vaart (yellow card) 22'; Son 63', (yellow card) 90+1'	Report (in German)	Pospěch (yellow card) 25'	Stadium: Imtech Arena; Attendance: 53,000; Referee: Daniel Siebert (Berlin)

24 November 2012 13	Mainz 05	1–2	Borussia Dortmund	Mainz
15:30 CET (UTC+01:00)	Caligiuri 4'; Szalai (yellow card) 45+1'; Zabavník (yellow card) 67'; Müller (yellow card) 75'; Svensson (yellow card) 81'	Report (in German)	Götze 19', 43'	Stadium: Coface Arena; Attendance: 34,000; Referee: Knut Kircher (Rottenburg)

27 November 2012 14	Eintracht Frankfurt	1–3	Mainz 05	Frankfurt
20:00 CET (UTC+01:00)	Schwegler (yellow card) 16'; Szalai 55' (o.g.); Zambrano (yellow card) 81'	Report (in German)	Ivanschitz 18'; Parker 42'; Baumgartlinger (yellow card) 50' (yellow-red card) 88'; Polanski (yellow card) 50'; Noveski 53'	Stadium: Commerzbank-Arena; Attendance: 47,800; Referee: Wolfgang Stark (Ergolding)

1 December 2012 15	Mainz 05	2–1	Hannover 96	Mainz
15:30 CET (UTC+01:00)	Müller 10'; Wetklo (yellow card) 29', (red card) 49'; Noveski (yellow card) 44'; Szalai (yellow card) 89' (goal) 89'	Report (in German)	Schulz 28'; Pinto (yellow card) 48'; Haggui (yellow card) 59'; Schulz (yellow card) 87'	Stadium: Coface Arena; Attendance: 32,000; Referee: Günther Perl (Pullach)

9 December 2012 16	Borussia Mönchengladbach	2–0	Mainz 05	Mönchengladbach
15:30 CET (UTC+01:00)	Hanke 58'; Arango 63'; Herrmann (yellow card) 77'; Domínguez (yellow card) 87'	Report (in German)	Soto (yellow card) 45'; Noveski (yellow card) 83'	Stadium: Borussia-Park; Attendance: 46,622; Referee: Thorsten Kinhöfer (Herne)

15 December 2012 17	Mainz 05	3–1	VfB Stuttgart	Mainz
15:30 CET (UTC+01:00)	N. Müller (yellow card) 45+1', (goal) 55', 71'; Zabavník (yellow card) 47'; Kirchhoff (yellow card) 80'; Soto 90+2'	Report (in German)	Harnik 48', (yellow card) 74'; Ibišević (yellow card) 57'	Stadium: Coface Arena; Attendance: 31,376; Referee: Felix Brych (Munich)

19 January 2013 18	Mainz 05	0–0	SC Freiburg	Mainz
15:30 CET (UTC+01:00)	Baumgartlinger (yellow card) 23'; Svensson (yellow card) 75'; Parker (yellow card) 86' (yellow-red card) 89'	Report (in German)	Guédé (yellow card) 16'; Krmaš (yellow card) 45+1'	Stadium: Coface Arena; Attendance: 27,519; Referee: Felix Zwayer (Berlin)

26 January 2013 19	SpVgg Greuther Fürth	0–3	Mainz 05	Fürth
15:30 CET (UTC+01:00)	Fürstner (yellow card) 77'	Report (in German)	Mallı (yellow card) 14', (goal) 65'; Szalai 53', 84', (yellow card) 70'; N. Müller (yellow card) 74'	Stadium: Trolli Arena; Attendance: 14,425; Referee: Marco Fritz (Korb)

2 February 2013 20	Mainz 05	0–3	Bayern Munich	Mainz
15:30 CET (UTC+01:00)	Zabavník (yellow card) 25'; N. Müller (yellow card) 27'; Risse (yellow card) 88'	Report (in German)	T. Müller 41'; Mandžukić 50', 57'	Stadium: Coface Arena; Attendance: 34,000; Referee: Michael Weiner (Giesen)

10 February 2013 21	FC Augsburg	1–1	Mainz 05	Augsburg
15:30 CET (UTC+01:00)	Mölders 57'; Hain (yellow card) 87'; Parkhurst (yellow card) 90'	Report (in German)	Ivanschitz (yellow card) 8'; Díaz (yellow card) 39'; Szalai 43'; Parker (red card) 45+1'	Stadium: SGL Arena; Attendance: 25,541; Referee: Tobias Stieler (Obertshausen)

16 February 2013 22	Mainz 05	2–2	Schalke 04	Mainz
15:30 CET (UTC+01:00)	Ivanschitz 27'; Svensson (yellow card) 47'; Pospěch 63'	Report (in German)	Bastos 41', 82'; Matip (yellow card) 60'; Fuchs (yellow card) 66'; Neustädter (yellow card) 84'	Stadium: Coface Arena; Attendance: 34,000; Referee: Wolfgang Stark (Ergolding)

23 February 2013 23	Mainz 05	1–1	VfL Wolfsburg	Mainz
15:30 CET (UTC+01:00)	Zimling 5' (yellow card) 72'	Report (in German)	Naldo 15'; Madlung (red card) 30'; Diego (yellow card) 39'; Kjær (yellow card) 42'	Stadium: Coface Arena; Attendance: 27,175; Referee: Peter Sippel (Munich)

3 March 2013 24	Fortuna Düsseldorf	1–1	Mainz 05	Düsseldorf
17:30 CET (UTC+01:00)	Svensson 6' (o.g.); Latka (yellow card) 20'; Lambertz (yellow card) 82'; Rafael (yellow card) 88'	Report (in German)	Zabavník (yellow card) 15'; Klasnić 40'; N. Müller (yellow card) 71'	Stadium: Esprit Arena; Attendance: 40,226; Referee: Felix Brych (Munich)

9 March 2013 25	Mainz 05	1–0	Bayer Leverkusen	Mainz
15:30	Bell (yellow card) 41'; Ivanschitz 61' (pen.); Szalai (yellow card) 79'; Noveski (yellow card) 82'	Referee	Reinartz (yellow card) 20'; Friedrich (yellow card) 81'	Stadium: Coface Arena; Attendance: 30,124; Referee: Florian Meyer

16 March 2013 26	1899 Hoffenheim	0–0	Mainz 05	Sinsheim
15:30	Ochs (yellow card) 48'; Vestergaard (yellow card) 73'	Referee	Wetklo (yellow card) 61'	Stadium: Rhein-Neckar-Arena; Attendance: 24,500; Referee: Robert Hartmann

30 March 2013 27	Mainz 05	1–1	Werder Bremen	Mainz
15:30	Szalai 1'; Zimling (yellow card) 28'; Pospěch (yellow card) 41'; Parker (yellow card) 90+1'	Report	Hunt 69'; De Bruyne (yellow card) 77'; Trybull (yellow card) 89'	Stadium: Coface Arena; Attendance: 33,374; Referee: Manuel Gräfe

7 April 2013 28	1. FC Nürnberg	2–1	Mainz 05	Nuremberg
15:30	Nilsson 54', 69'; Balitsch (yellow card) 57'; Polter (yellow card) 89'	Report	N. Müller 60'; Baumgartlinger (yellow card) 87'	Stadium: Stadion Nürnberg; Attendance: 35,082; Referee: Tobias Stieler

13 April 2013 29	Mainz 05	1–2	Hamburger SV	Mainz
15:30	Parker 86'; Zimling (yellow card) 89'; Ivanschitz (yellow card) 90+3'	Report	Son 61', 81'; Westermann (yellow card) 74'	Stadium: Coface Arena; Attendance: 34,000; Referee: Peter Gagelmann

20 April 2013 30	Borussia Dortmund	2–0	Mainz 05	Dortmund
15:30	Reus 1', (yellow card) 31'; Hummels (yellow card) 41'; Schmelzer (yellow card) 79'; Lewandowski 87'	Report	Bell (yellow card) 68'; Zimling (yellow card) 78'; Wetklo (yellow card) 90'	Stadium: Signal Iduna Park; Attendance: 80,645; Referee: Florian Meyer

28 April 2013 31	Mainz 05	0–0	Eintracht Frankfurt	Mainz
15:30		Report	Celozzi (yellow card) 27'; Lanig (yellow card) 81'	Stadium: Coface Arena; Attendance: 34,000; Referee: Knut Kircher

4 May 2013 32	Hannover 96	2–2	Mainz 05	Hanover
15:30	Schulz (yellow card) 20' (yellow-red card) 65'; Sobiech 36'; Diouf 70'; Pinto (yellow card) 87'	Report	N. Müller 25', 79', (yellow card) 40'; Zimling (yellow card) 88'	Stadium: AWD-Arena; Attendance: 47,000; Referee: Wolfgang Stark

11 May 2013 33	Mainz 05	2–4	Borussia Mönchengladbach	Mainz
15:30	Parker 12'; Svensson (yellow card) 39'; Ivanschitz 90+1'	Report	Hrgota 39' (pen.), 59', 80'; Hanke 64'	Stadium: Coface Arena; Attendance: 34,000; Referee: Felix Brych

18 May 2013 34	VfB Stuttgart	2–2	Mainz 05	Stuttgart
15:30	Ulreich (yellow card) 10'; Wetklo 22' (o.g.); Boka 33'; Gentner (yellow card) 37'	Report	Ede 16'; N. Müller 42'	Stadium: Mercedes-Benz Arena; Attendance: 51,020; Referee: Michael Weiner

=== DFB-Pokal ===
19 August 2012 1st Round	SV Roßbach/Verscheid	0–4	Mainz 05	Koblenz
20:30 CEST (UTC+02:00)		Report (in German)	Szalai 5', 43'; Baumgartlinger 47'; Choupo-Moting 62'	Stadium: Stadion Oberwerth; Attendance: 3,100; Referee: Bibiana Steinhaus (Hannover)

30 October 2013 2nd Round	Mainz 05	2–0	Erzgebirge Aue	Mainz
20:30 CEST (UTC+02:00)	Ivanschitz 18'; Mallı 47'; Pospěch (yellow card) 60'; Risse (yellow card) 70'	Report (in German)	Schlitte (yellow card) 52'	Stadium: Coface Arena; Attendance: 12,677; Referee: Bastian Dankert (Rostock)

18 December 2012 Round of 16	Schalke 04	1–2	Mainz 05	Gelsenkirchen
19:00 CET (UTC+01:00)	Caligiuri 30'; Caligiuri (yellow card) 52'; N. Müller 83'	Report (in German)	Jones (yellow card) 65'; Huntelaar 75'	Stadium: Veltins-Arena; Attendance: 54,202; Referee: Marco Fritz (Korb)

26 February 2013 Quarter-finals	Mainz 05	2–3 (a.e.t.)	SC Freiburg	Mainz
19:00 CET (UTC+01:00)	Parker 2'; Zimling 4'; Pospěch (yellow card) 56' (yellow-red card) 65'; Baumgartlinger (yellow card) 105'	Report (in German)	Rosenthal (yellow card) 66'; Krmaš (yellow card) 71'; Santini 86'; Caligiuri 90+3' (pen.), 108'; Makiadi (yellow card) 117'	Stadium: Coface Arena; Attendance: 23,517; Referee: Deniz Aytekin (Oberasbach)

== Squad information ==
=== Squad and statistics ===
As of 25 February 2013

No.	Pos	Nat	Player	Total		Bundesliga		DFB-Pokal	
No.	Pos	Nat	Player	Apps	Goals	Apps	Goals	Apps	Goals
Goalkeepers
21	GK	(Germany) GER	Loris Karius	1	0	1	0	0	0
29	GK	(Germany) GER	Christian Wetklo	25	0	22	0	3	0
33	GK	(Germany) GER	Heinz Müller	3	0	2	0	1	0
Defenders
2	DF	(Denmark) DEN	Bo Svensson	19	0	16	0	3	0
3	DF	(Czech Republic) CZE	Zdeněk Pospěch	26	1	23	1	3	0
4	DF	(North Macedonia) MKD	Nikolče Noveski	27	2	23	2	4	0
8	DF	(Slovakia) SVK	Radoslav Zabavník	15	0	13	0	2	0
15	DF	(Germany) GER	Jan Kirchhoff	18	0	15	0	3	0
16	DF	(Germany) GER	Stefan Bell	2	0	2	0	0	0
20	DF	(Costa Rica) CRC	Júnior Díaz	18	1	16	1	2	0
24	DF	(Germany) GER	Tobias Schilk	0	0	0	0	0	0
26	DF	(Germany) GER	Niko Bungert	8	0	7	0	1	0
Midfielders
6	MF	(Germany) GER	Marco Caligiuri	21	2	18	1	3	1
7	MF	(Denmark) DEN	Niki Zimling	5	1	4	0	1	1
11	MF	(Germany) GER	Yunus Mallı	9	2	8	1	1	1
13	MF	(Australia) AUS	Nikita Rukavytsya	7	0	6	0	1	0
14	MF	(Austria) AUT	Julian Baumgartlinger	26	1	22	0	4	1
17	MF	(Germany) GER	Chinedu Ede	6	0	4	0	2	0
19	MF	(Colombia) COL	Elkin Soto	24	1	21	1	3	0
23	MF	(Germany) GER	Marcel Risse	18	1	16	1	2	0
25	MF	(Austria) AUT	Andreas Ivanschitz	25	6	23	5	2	1
27	MF	(Germany) GER	Nicolai Müller	26	5	22	4	4	1
Strikers
10	FW	(Cameroon) CMR	Eric Maxim Choupo-Moting	6	1	5	0	1	1
28	FW	(Hungary) HUN	Ádám Szalai	27	14	23	12	4	2
31	FW	(Germany) GER	Shawn Parker	10	2	8	1	2	1
39	FW	(Croatia) CRO	Ivan Klasnić	3	1	3	1	0	0

Last updated: 4 March 2013.
Source: kicker.de

=== Transfers ===
==== In ====
No.	Pos.	Nat.	Name	Age	EU	Moving from	Type	Transfer window	Ends	Transfer fee	Source
20	DF	(Costa Rica)	Júnior Díaz	28	EU	Club Brugge (Belgium)	Transfer	Summer	June 2015	Undisclosed	
17	MF	(Germany)	Chinedu Ede	25	EU	Union Berlin	Transfer	Summer	June 2016	Undisclosed	
13	MF	(Australia)	Nikita Rukavytsya	25	EU	Hertha BSC	Transfer	Summer	June 2015	~€1,000,000	
39	FW	(Croatia)	Ivan Klasnić	32	EU	Bolton Wanderers (England)	End of contract	Summer	June 2013	Free	
7	MF	(Denmark)	Niki Zimling	27	EU	Club Brugge (Belgium)	Transfer	Winter	June 2017	Undisclosed	

==== Out ====
No.	Pos.	Nat.	Name	Age	EU	Moving to	Type	Transfer window	Transfer fee	Source
42	MF	(Poland)	Eugen Polanski	26	EU	1899 Hoffenheim	Transfer	Summer	Undisclosed	
	FW	(Switzerland)	Mario Gavranović	23	EU	Schalke 04	End of loan	Summer	None	
	FW	(Egypt)	Mohamed Zidan	30	EU	Baniyas (United Arab Emirates)	Transfer	Summer	Free	
16	MF	(Hungary)	Zoltán Stieber	23	EU	SpVgg Greuther Fürth	Transfer	Summer	Free	
34	DF	(Germany)	Fabian Schönheim	25	EU	Union Berlin	Loan	Summer	Undisclosed	
11	FW	(Tunisia)	Sami Allagui	26	EU	Hertha BSC	Transfer	Summer	Undisclosed	
15	DF	(Germany)	Malik Fathi	28	EU	Kayserispor (Turkey)	Loan	Summer	€200,000	
10	FW	(Turkey)	Deniz Yılmaz	24	EU	SC Paderborn	Loan	Summer	€50,000	
