= Jan Kirchhoff =

German footballer (born 1990)

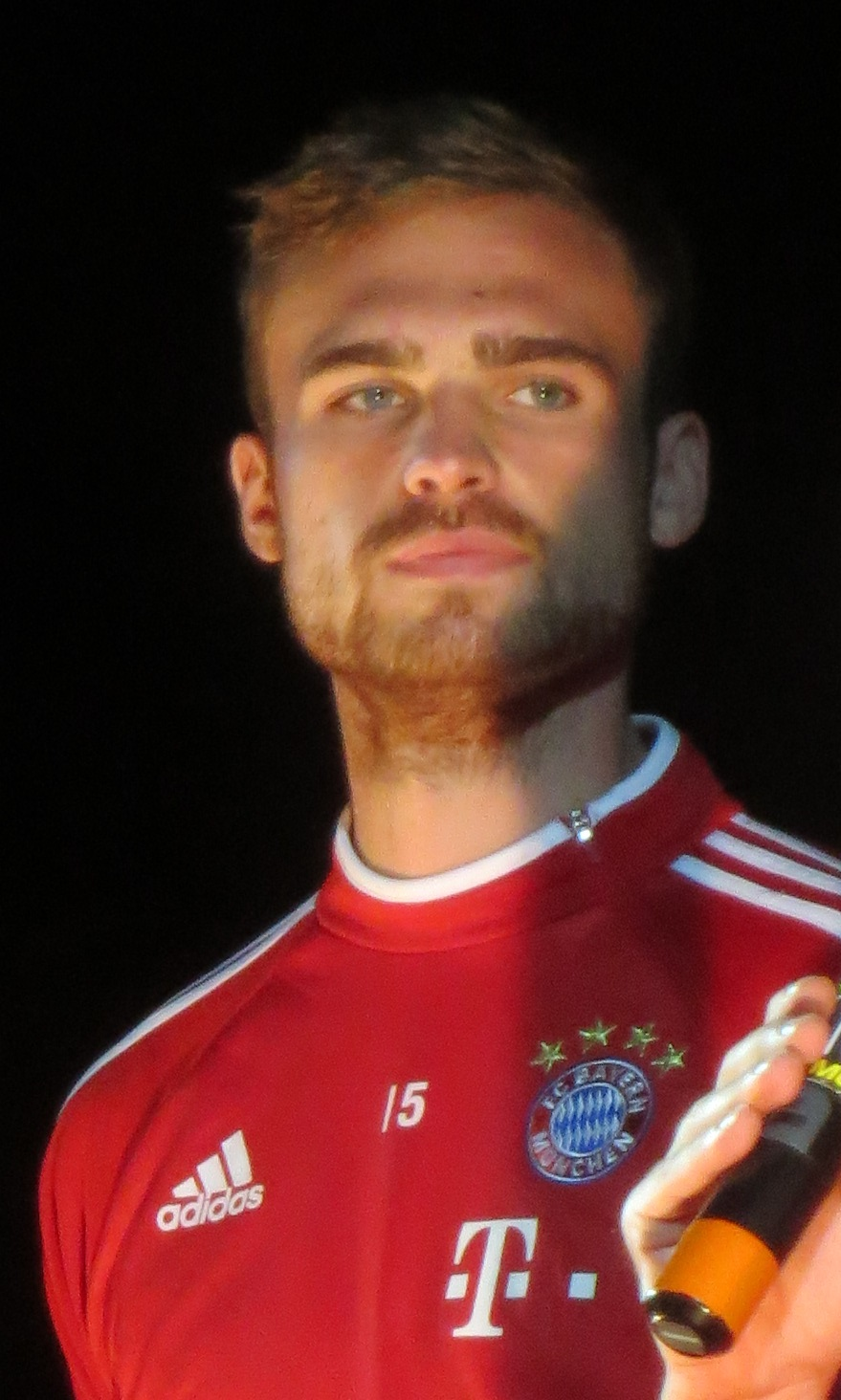
- Kirchhoff with Bayern Munich in 2013

Personal information
- Full name: Jan Tilman Kirchhoff
- Date of birth: 1 October 1990 (age 36)
- Place of birth: Frankfurt, West Germany
- Height: 1.95 m (6 ft 5 in)
- Positions: Centre-back; defensive midfielder

Youth career
- SpVgg Kickers 16 Frankfurt
- 1999–2007: Eintracht Frankfurt
- 2007–2009: Mainz 05

Senior career*
Years	Team	Apps	(Gls)
2008–2010	Mainz 05 II	19	(2)
2008–2013	Mainz 05	58	(0)
2013–2016	Bayern Munich	7	(0)
2014–2015	→ Schalke 04 (loan)	16	(0)
2015	Bayern Munich II	1	(0)
2016–2017	Sunderland	22	(0)
2018	Bolton Wanderers	4	(0)
2019	1. FC Magdeburg	10	(0)
2019–2021	KFC Uerdingen	22	(2)
Total		159	(4)

International career
2007–2008	Germany U18	3	(0)
2008–2009	Germany U19	8	(1)
2010–2013	Germany U21	18	(3)
- * Club domestic league appearances and goals

Jan Tilman Kirchhoff (born 1 October 1990) is a German former professional footballer who played as a centre-back or defensive midfielder.

== Club career ==
=== Mainz 05 ===
Born in Frankfurt, West Germany, Kirchhoff began his football career at SpVgg Kickers 16 Frankfurt before joining Eintracht Frankfurt in 1999. While at Eintracht Frankfurt, he was once a ball boy. Kirchhoff then joined 1. FSV Mainz 05 in 2007 and it was there when he switched position from midfield position to centre–back position. At the time of moving to the club, Kirchhoff was a student, attending a boarding school. While progressing at 1. FSV Mainz 05, he was a captain for the club's second team and was eventually called up to the first team.

Kirchhoff made his professional debut in the 2. Bundesliga for 1. FSV Mainz 05 on 2 November 2008, when he started in a game against Rot Weiss Ahlen. This turns out to be his only appearance for the side in the 2008–09 season, as Kirchhoff continued to play for the club's second team. However, he was sidelined for most of the 2009–10 season, due to an Achilles injury.

Ahead of the 2010–11 season, Kirchhoff signed a three–year contract with 1. FSV Mainz 05, keeping him until 2013. He continued to feature for the club's second team in the first half of the season. It wasn't until on 4 December 2010 when Kirchhoff made his first appearance of the season, starting the whole game, in a 2–1 loss against Eintracht Frankfurt. Following this, he began to receive a handful of first team football towards the end of the 2010–11 season, playing in either central defence and defensive midfield positions. At the end of the 2010–11 season, Kirchhoff made ten appearances in all competitions.

At the start of the 2011–12 season, Kirchhoff found his playing time, mostly coming from the substitute bench in a number of matches. By October, manager Thomas Tuchel began to put him in the defensive midfield position. Manager Tuchel explained his decision to put Kirchhoff in the defensive midfield position, saying: "Jan doesn't work as a double six, and we absolutely want him in the field." After missing one match due to a knee injury, he returned to the starting line–up against Wolfsburg on 3 December 2011, only for him to score an own goal, in a 2–2 draw. Kirchhoff then switched to the centre–back position for the remainder of the 2011–12 season. He helped the club keep four consecutive clean sheets between 10 April 2012 and 28 April 2012. Despite being sidelined on two more occasions later the 2011–12 season, Kirchhoff made thirty–two appearances in all competitions.

Ahead of the 2012–13 season, the club began talks with Kirchhoff over a new contract following interest from German clubs. At the start of the 2012–13 season, Kirchhoff continued to regain his first team place, as he began to rotate in either the defensive midfield and centre–back position. His performance has been regarded as one of the most talented defenders in the Bundesliga, furthering more interests from clubs around Europe. However, Kirchhoff suffered a muscular problems in the thigh that kept him out for weeks. He didn't make a return to the first team until on 15 December 2012, starting the whole game, in a 3–1 win against VfB Stuttgart. Three days later on 18 December 2012, Kirchhoff played a role against Schalke 04 in the Round of 16 of DFB–Pokal, coming on in the 80th minute, and setting up the club's second goal of the game, in a 2–1 win. It was announced on 27 December 2012 that Kirchhoff would be leaving 1. FSV Mainz 05 at the end of the 2012–13 season. His return was short–lived when he was suspended for one match. Despite returning to the first team on two occasions, Kirchhoff, once again, was plagued with injuries for the rest of the season. At the end of the 2012–13 season, he made twenty–one appearances in all competitions.

=== Bayern Munich ===
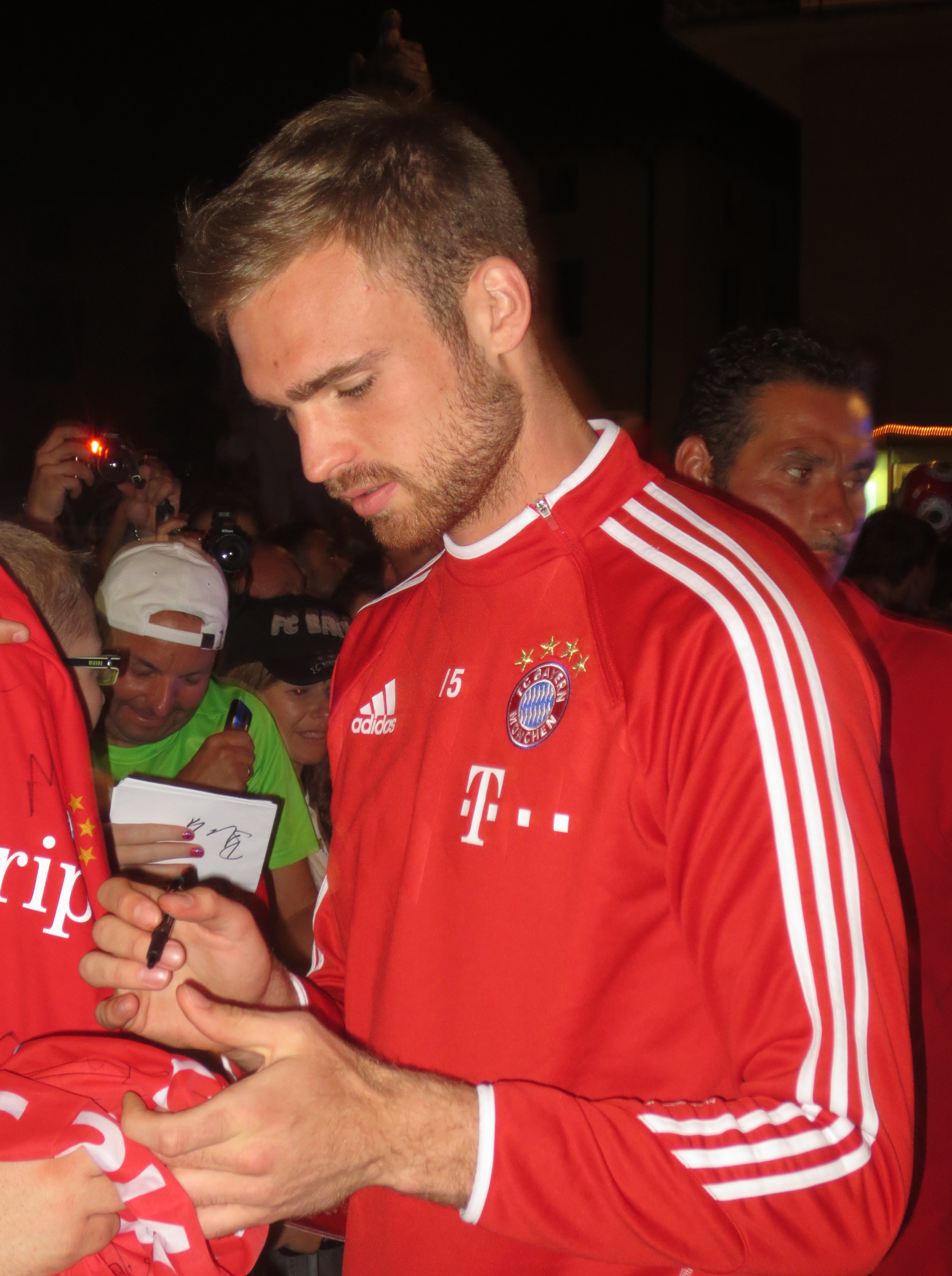
Kirchhoff signing autograph for the Bayern Munich supporters.

On 4 January 2013, Kirchhoff signed a pre-contract with Bayern Munich, agreeing to join them for the 2013–14 season as a free agent. It was announced on 21 June 2013 that he was given a number fifteen shirt.

Kirchhoff made his Bayern Munich debut, coming on as a 61st-minute substitute, as the club won 5–0 in the team's 2013–14 DFB-Pokal first-round game against Schwarz-Weiß Rehden. Four days later on 9 August 2013 he made his league debut for the club, coming on as a 73rd-minute substitute, in a 3–1 win against Borussia Mönchengladbach in the opening game of the season. However, his return was short–lived when Kirchhoff suffered a muscular problem that kept him out throughout August. It wasn't until on 14 September 2013 when he returned to the first team, coming on as an 86th-minute substitute, in a 2–0 win against Hannover 96. A month later on 2 October 2013, Kirchhoff made his UEFA Champions League debut, coming on as a 76th-minute substitute, in a 3–1 win against Manchester City. However, he found his first team opportunities at FC Bayern Munich limited, resulting in him being placed on the substitute bench and faced his own injury concern. By the time Kirchhoff left the club, he made eleven appearances in all competitions. Despite being loaned out, Kirchhoff was a member of Bayern Munich squad that won the Bundesliga and FIFA Club World Cup.

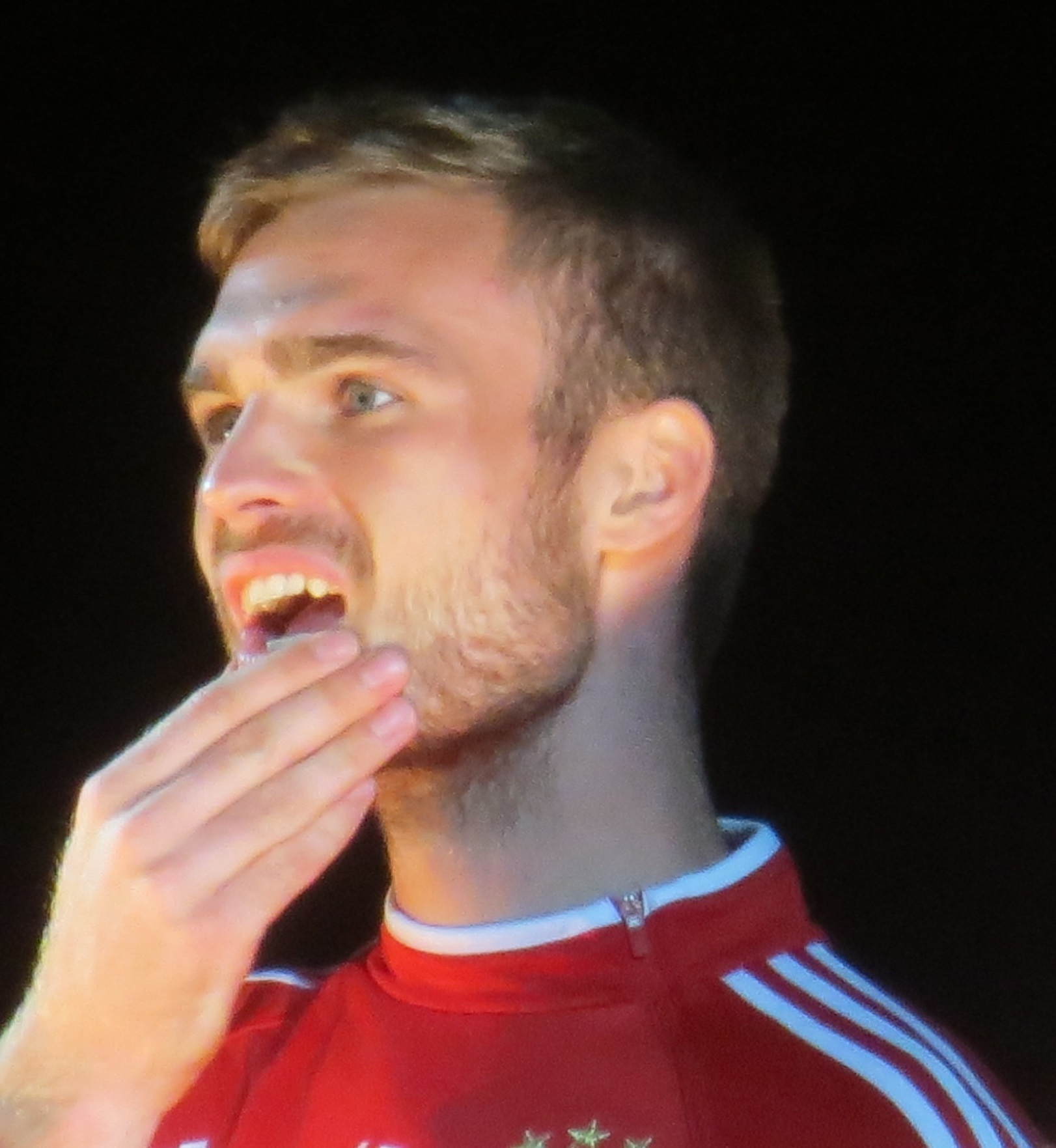
Kirchhoff pictured at Bayern Munich training camp in Italy.

After finishing his loan spell at Schalke 04, Kirchhoff, however, suffered an Achilles tendon problems ahead of the 2015–16 season. Upon returning to the training, Manager Pep Guardiola sent him to play for the club's second team. He only made one appearance for the club, coming as a late substitute against SV Darmstadt 98 in the Round of 16 of the DFB–Pokal, winning 1–0.

==== Schalke 04 (loan) ====
On 27 December 2013, Kirchhoff joined fellow Bundesliga side Schalke 04 on a one-and-a-half-year loan until 30 June 2015.

However, he suffered a setback to his Schalke 04 career after suffering from a syndesmotic ligament tear that kept him out for months. Kirchhoff made his Schalke 04 debut, coming on as a 75th-minute substitute, in a 2–0 win against SC Freiburg on 3 May 2014. At the end of the 2013–14 season, he made two appearances in all competitions.

After missing the opening game of the 2014–15 season due to a knee injury, Kirchhoff made his first appearance of the season, starting a match and played 40 minutes before being substituted due to a tendon injury, as the club drew 1–1 against Bayern Munich. Following this, he was sidelined for a month. Kirchhoff didn't make his return on 18 October 2014, coming on as a late substitute, in a 2–0 win against Hertha BSC. Since returning to the first team from injury, he became a first team regular, rotating in playing either the defensive midfield position and centre–back position. Although Kirchhoff returned to the starting line–up on two occasions, he, once again, found himself sidelined on three occasions as the season progressed. It was announced on 30 December 2014 that Kirchhoff returned to his parent club at the end of the 2014–15 season. He went on to make eighteen appearances in all competitions.

=== Sunderland ===
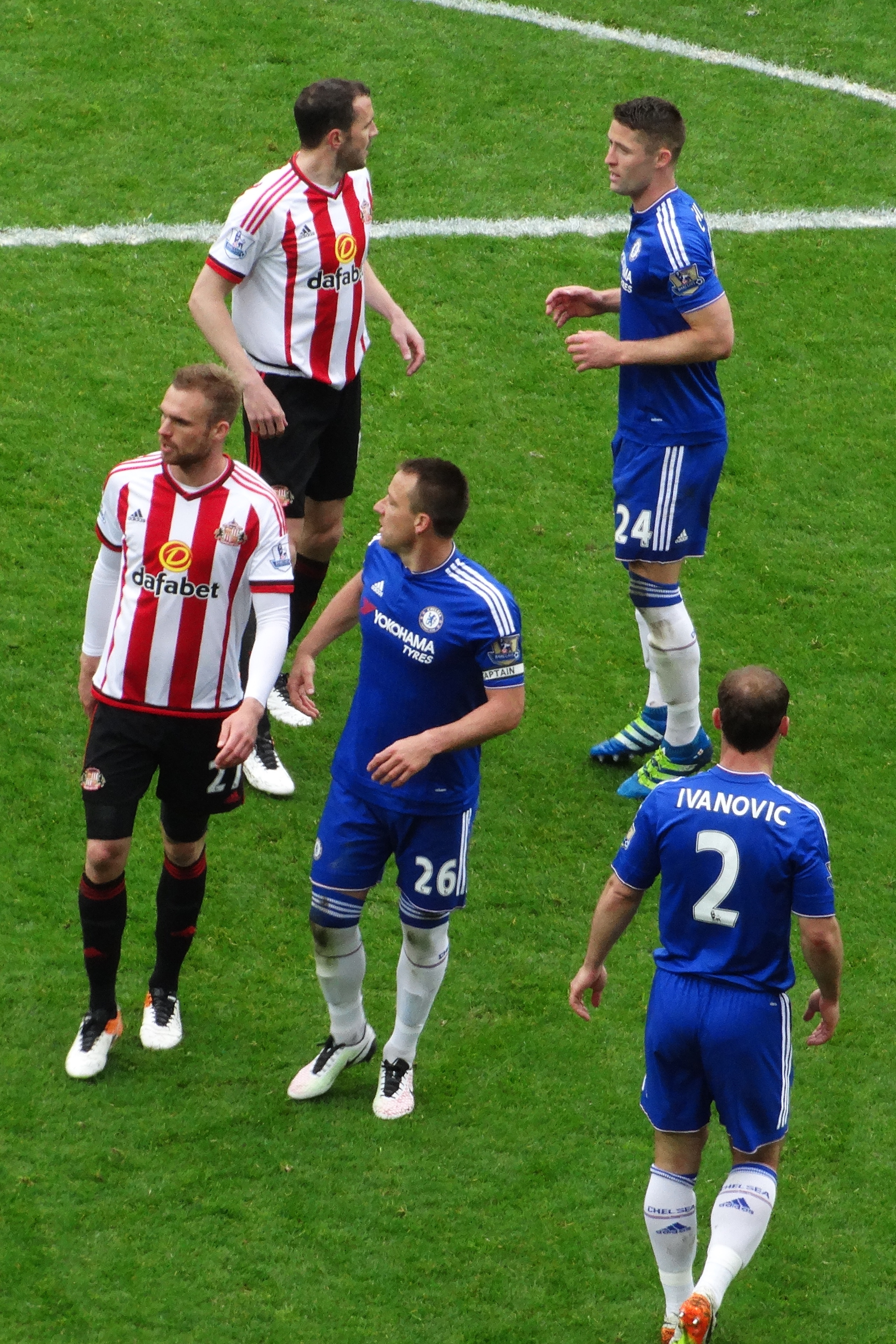
Kirchhoff (left) playing for Sunderland against Chelsea on 7 May 2016.

On 7 January 2016, Kirchhoff signed an 18-month contract with Sunderland for an undisclosed fee.

On 16 January 2016, Kirchhoff made his debut for Sunderland as a 58th-minute substitute, in a 4–1 loss against Tottenham Hotspur. Kirchhoff made a poor start as he deflected a shot from Christian Eriksen which led to a goal, and conceded a penalty with a foul on Danny Rose. The German was then deployed mainly as a defensive midfielder and earned plaudits due to his precise tackling and passing. Kirchhoff was voted the PFA Fans' Player of the Month for April for his performances as Sunderland fought against relegation. Kirchhoff's efforts paid off as Sunderland managed to survive relegation thanks to a 3–0 win over Everton on 11 May 2016 with goals coming from defenders Patrick van Aanholt and a brace from Lamine Koné. At the end of the 2015–16 season, he made fifteen appearances in all competitions.

However at the start of the 2016–17 season, Kirchhoff suffered a hamstring injury during a 1–1 draw against Montpellier in a friendly match and was sidelined for a month. It wasn't until on 12 September 2016 when Kirchhoff returned to the starting line–up and played 76 minutes before being substituted, in a 3–0 loss against Everton. Following this, the club's poor form in the next two matches led him speaking out on the poor performance. Kirchhoff also later said in an interview with The Atlantic that he had a difficult relationship with Manager David Moyes. However, during a 1–1 draw against West Bromwich Albion on 1 October 2016, Kirchhoff suffered a hamstring injury in the 57th minute and was substituted a result. Following this, it was announced that he would be out for six weeks. It wasn't until on 3 December 2016 when Kirchhoff returned to the starting line–up against Leicester City, setting up the club's first goal of the game, in a 2–1 win. Two weeks later on 17 December 2016 during a 1–0 loss against Chelsea, he suffered a knee ligament injury in the 57th minute and was substituted. Following this, it was announced that Kirchhoff was out for the rest of the 2016–17 season. Having made nine appearances in all competitions, Kirchhoff left Sunderland when his contract expired at the end of the 2016–17 season.

=== Bolton Wanderers ===
On 22 February 2018, following a trial, Kirchhoff signed a contract with Championship side Bolton Wanderers until the end of the season.

He made his debut for Bolton Wanderers as a second-half substitute for Jem Karacan in a 3–1 loss against local rivals, Preston North End, on 3 March 2018. On 24 May 2018, Bolton Wanderers confirmed that Kirchhoff would leave the club on 30 June when his contract came to an end. By the time he departed from Bolton Wanderers, he had made just four appearances in all competitions.

=== 1. FC Magdeburg ===
After being a free agent for over six months, Kirchhoff returned to Germany, where he joined 1. FC Magdeburg until the end of the 2018–19 season.

Kirchhoff made his FC Magdeburg debut, where he started the whole game and kept a clean sheet, in a 1–0 win against Erzgebirge Aue on 29 January 2019. In a follow–up match against FC Ingolstadt 04, however, Kirchhoff suffered a groin injury and was substituted at half time, as they won 1–0. He returned to the starting line–up and played the whole game, setting up the club's second goal of the game, in a 3–1 win against Arminia Bielefeld on 17 February 2019. Following a muscular problem that kept him out for one match, Kirchhoff returned to the starting line–up as captain, as FC Magdeburg drew 1–1. This was followed up by captaining three matches. However, he, once again, suffered two more injuries that kept him out for the rest of the 2018–19 season. However, the club were relegated to 3.Liga following a 4–2 loss against VfL Bochum on 4 May 2019. Despite suffering injuries, Kirchhoff had always remained in the first team, as he made ten appearances in all competitions. At the end of the 2018–19 season, it was announced that Kirchhoff would be leaving the club.

=== KFC Uerdingen 05 ===
On 14 June 2019, KFC Uerdingen 05 confirmed that they had signed Kirchhoff on a two-year contract. In July, the club announced that Kirchhoff would be the new captain of the team.

Kirchhoff captained his first match on his Uerdingen 05 debut, helping the side keep a clean sheet, in a 1–0 win against Hallescher FC in the opening game of the season. However, his return was short–lived when he suffered a knee injury that kept him out for weeks. It wasn't until on 17 August 2019 when Kirchhoff returned to the starting line–up as captain, in a 3–0 loss against FC Ingolstadt 04. Since returning from injury, he continued to regain his first team place, rotating in the defensive midfield and centre–back positions. Kirchhoff then kept three consecutive clean sheets between 4 October 2019 and 26 October 2019, in which he scored in a 2–0 win against Carl Zeiss Jena. However, he was on the sidelines on three occasions by the end of the year. Kirchhoff returned to the first team, coming on as a 59th-minute substitute, in a 3–0 loss against Bayern Munich II on 26 January 2020. He later regained his first team place, as well as, his captaincy for the next six matches. His second goal for the club then came on 30 May 2020, in a 2–1 win against Waldhof Mannheim. However, Kirchhoff suffered a muscle injury that kept him out for the rest of the 2019–20 season. Despite the season being suspended because of the COVID-19 pandemic, he went on to make twenty–one appearances and scoring once in all competitions.

== International career ==
On 13 November 2007, Kirchhoff debuted for the Germany national U18 team coming on in the 72nd minute of the match in a 4–0 win over Republic of Ireland U18s. He later made two more appearances for the U18 side.

On 7 September 2008, Kirchhoff debuted for the Germany national U19 team in a 5–0 win over Czech Republic U19s. He scored his first U19 goal on 11 October 2008 in the 55th minute of the match in a 5–0 win over Lithuania U19s. Kirchhoff went on to make eight appearances and scored once for the U19 side.

On 3 September 2009, Kirchhoff debuted for the Germany U21s in a 1–1 draw against Czech Republic U21s and scored his first U21 goal in the 72nd minute. It wasn't until on 31 May 2011 when he scored his second U21 goal in the 14th minute, in a 4–2 loss against Portugal U21. Kirchhoff then kept three consecutive clean sheets between 1 September 2011 and 6 October 2011. In 2012, Kirchhoff participated with the U21 team as an important squad member and the team's vice-captain in the 2013 UEFA European U21 Championship qualification but due to injury he could not take part in the 2013 UEFA European U21 Championship. He went on to make eighteen appearances and scoring three times in all competitions for the U21 side.

== Personal life ==
Kirchhoff's brother Benjamin Kirchhoff is also a professional football defender who plays for TSV Steinbach Haiger. Kirchhoff's father Theo Kirchhoff is a former footballer who played for German club VfL Germania Leer.

== Career statistics ==
Appearances and goals by club, season and competition
Club	Season	League			National cup		League cup		Continental		Total		Ref.
Club	Season	League	Apps	Goals	Apps	Goals	Apps	Goals	Apps	Goals	Apps	Goals	Ref.
Mainz 05 II	2007–08	Oberliga Südwest	1	0	—		—		—		1	0	
Mainz 05 II	2008–09	Regionalliga West	6	1	—		—		—		6	1	
Mainz 05 II	2010–11	Regionalliga West	12	1	—		—		—		12	1	
Mainz 05 II	Total		19	2	—		—		—		19	2	—
Mainz 05	2008–09	2. Bundesliga	1	0	0	0	—		—		1	0	
Mainz 05	2010–11	Bundesliga	10	0	0	0	—		—		10	0	
Mainz 05	2011–12	Bundesliga	29	0	3	0	—		—		32	0	
Mainz 05	2012–13	Bundesliga	18	0	3	0	—		—		21	0	
Mainz 05	Total		58	0	6	0	—		—		64	0	—
Bayern Munich	2013–14	Bundesliga	7	0	2	0	—		2 (Note: Appearances in UEFA Champions League)	0	11	0	
Bayern Munich	2015–16	Bundesliga	0	0	1	0	—		0	0	1	0	
Bayern Munich	Total		7	0	3	0	—		2	0	12	0	—
Bayern Munich II	2015–16	Regionalliga Bayern	1	0	—		—		—		1	0	
Schalke (loan)	2013–14	Bundesliga	2	0	0	0	—		0	0	2	0	
Schalke (loan)	2014–15	Bundesliga	14	0	0	0	—		4	0	18	0	
Schalke (loan)	Total		16	0	0	0	—		4	0	20	0	—
Sunderland	2015–16	Premier League	15	0	0	0	0	0	—		15	0	
Sunderland	2016–17	Premier League	7	0	0	0	1	0	—		8	0	
Sunderland	Total		22	0	0	0	1	0	—		23	0	—
Bolton Wanderers	2017–18	Championship	4	0	0	0	—		—		4	0	
1. FC Magdeburg	2018–19	2. Bundesliga	10	0	0	0	—		—		10	0	
KFC Uerdingen 05	2019–20	3. Liga	21	2	0	0	0	0	—		21	2	
KFC Uerdingen 05	2020–21	3. Liga	1	0	0	0	1	0	—		1	0	
KFC Uerdingen 05	Total		22	2	0	0	0	0	—		22	2	—
Career total			159	4	9	0	1	0	6	0	175	4	—

== Honours ==
Mainz 05

- 2. Bundesliga: Promotion to Bundesliga 2009–10

Bayern Munich

- Bundesliga: 2013–14
- FIFA Club World Cup: 2013
