= Ádám Szalai =

Hungarian footballer (born 1987)

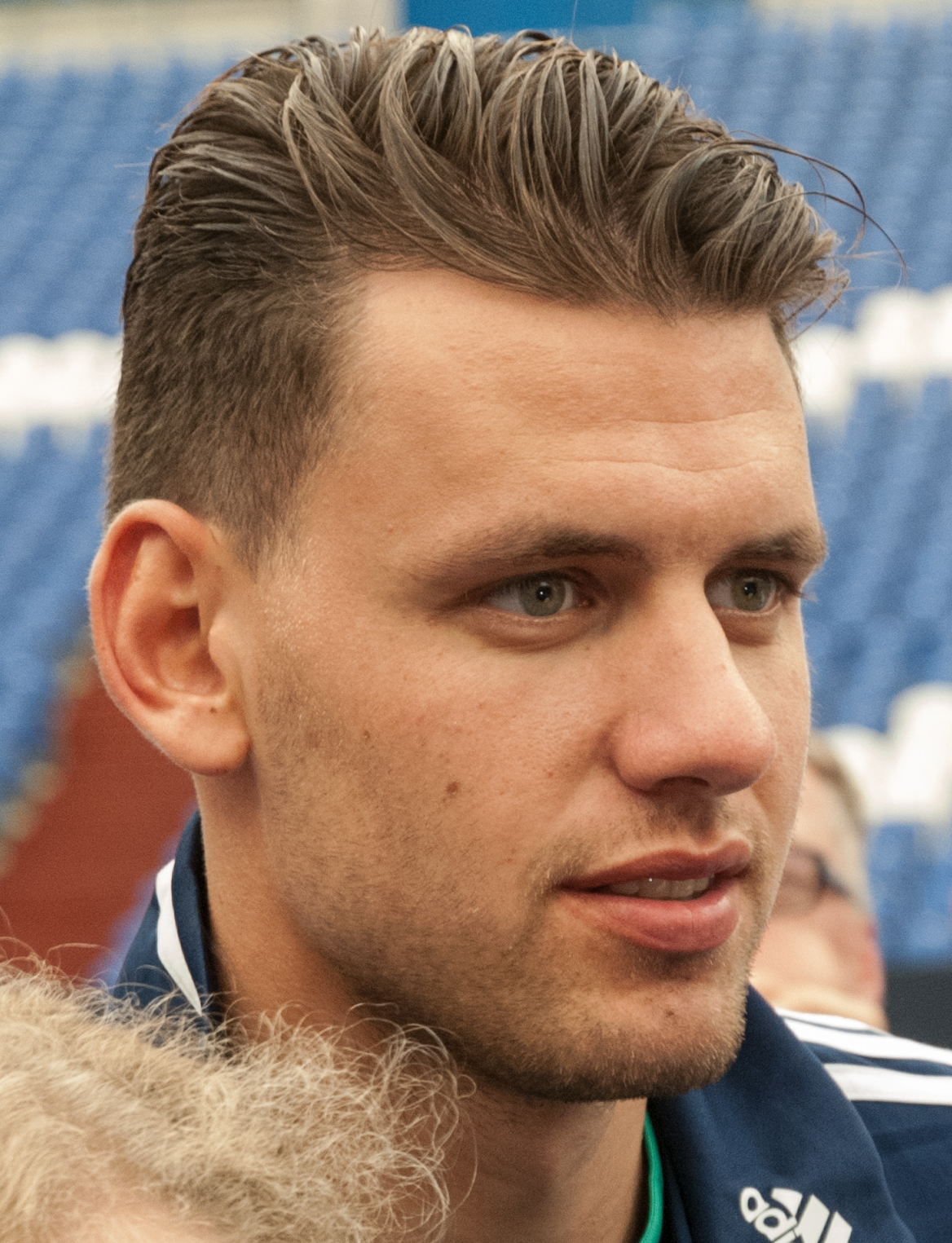
- Szalai in 2013

Personal information
- Full name: Ádám Csaba Szalai
- Date of birth: 9 December 1987 (age 38)
- Place of birth: Budapest, Hungary
- Height: 1.93 m (6 ft 4 in)
- Position: Forward

Youth career
- 1994–2000: Honvéd
- 2000–2004: Újpest
- 2004–2006: VfB Stuttgart

Senior career*
| Years | Team | Apps | (Gls) |
| 2006–2007 | VfB Stuttgart II | 33 | (5) |
| 2007–2010 | Real Madrid B | 79 | (23) |
| 2010 | → Mainz 05 (loan) | 15 | (1) |
| 2010–2013 | Mainz 05 | 64 | (20) |
| 2013–2014 | Schalke 04 | 28 | (7) |
| 2014–2019 | 1899 Hoffenheim | 100 | (23) |
| 2016 | → Hannover 96 (loan) | 12 | (0) |
| 2019–2022 | Mainz 05 | 57 | (3) |
| 2022–2023 | Basel | 17 | (4) |
| Total | | 405 | (86) |

International career
| 2007 | Hungary U20 | 11 | (6) |
| 2007–2008 | Hungary U21 | 6 | (5) |
| 2009–2022 | Hungary | 86 | (26) |
- * Club domestic league appearances and goals

Ádám Csaba Szalai (Hungarian pronunciation: [ˈaːdaːm ˈtʃɒbɒ ˈsɒlɒi]; born 9 December 1987) is a Hungarian former professional footballer who played as a forward.

He spent most of his career in Germany, signing in 2004 with VfB Stuttgart and going on to represent Mainz 05, Schalke 04, 1899 Hoffenheim and Hannover 96 in the Bundesliga. He also played three years in Spain, with Real Madrid Castilla.

A Hungarian international since 2009, Szalai won 86 caps and was part of the squad at two European Championships, scoring once in each tournament.

== Club career ==
=== Early years and Stuttgart ===
Szalai started his career in his hometown of Budapest, playing for Budapest Honvéd FC and Újpest FC. In 2004, he moved to Germany to complete his development, spending two years at the youth academy of VfB Stuttgart.

Szalai made his senior debut in the 2006–07 season, playing with the reserves in Regionalliga Süd.

=== Real Madrid Castilla ===
In August 2007, Szalai was transferred to Real Madrid Castilla, the reserve team of Real Madrid, for approximately €500.000.

In his second season in the Segunda División B – the only tier in which he competed during his spell in Spain – he scored 16 goals in 37 games, but the side could only rank sixth, thus missing out on the playoffs.

=== Mainz ===
On 9 January 2010, Real Madrid loaned Szalai to 1. FSV Mainz 05 until June. He made his Bundesliga debut seven days later, coming on as a 63rd-minute substitute in a 4–2 away loss against Bayer 04 Leverkusen.

Szalai scored his first goal for Mainz in a 1–0 home win over Borussia Dortmund on 10 April 2010. He netted his second against FC Bayern Munich on 25 September in a 2–1 away victory, with a powerful shot into the top corner in what was the Rhineland-Palatinate club's sixth consecutive win of the season, in an eventual run of seven. On 29 January 2011, at 1. FC Kaiserslautern, the player sustained a knee injury – cruciate ligament – which sidelined him for the remainder of the campaign.

On 22 January 2012, Szalai returned to action with Mainz after his injury, playing the second half of a 3–2 defeat at Leverkusen. On 1 August he signed a contract extension with the club running until June 2015 and, on 27 October, scored his first hat-trick for the team in a 3–0 home defeat of TSG 1899 Hoffenheim.

On 10 February 2013, Szalai scored his 12th goal of the campaign against FC Augsburg, thereby becoming the most productive Hungarian goalscorer in a single German top-division season, surpassing both Lajos Détári and Vasile Miriuță, whom netted 11 for Eintracht Frankfurt in 1987–88 and FC Energie Cottbus in 2000–01 respectively. On 15 April, Sky Sports published an article on the player where Horst Heldt, general manager of FC Schalke 04, reportedly showed interest in signing him, pending the club's qualification for the UEFA Champions League in order to fund the transfer.

=== Schalke 04 ===
On 27 June 2013, Szalai signed a four-year contract with Schalke. After making his official debut against amateurs FC Nöttingen in the first round of the DFB-Pokal, he played his first league match against Hamburger SV, scoring the hosts' last goal in a 3–3 draw after a shot from Christian Clemens was poorly handled by René Adler.

Szalai was instrumental in helping his team reach the group stage of the Champions League. After a 1–1 draw in the first leg against PAOK FC he grabbed a brace in the second match in Thessaloniki (3–2 win), and played the full 90 minutes on both occasions.

=== Hoffenheim ===
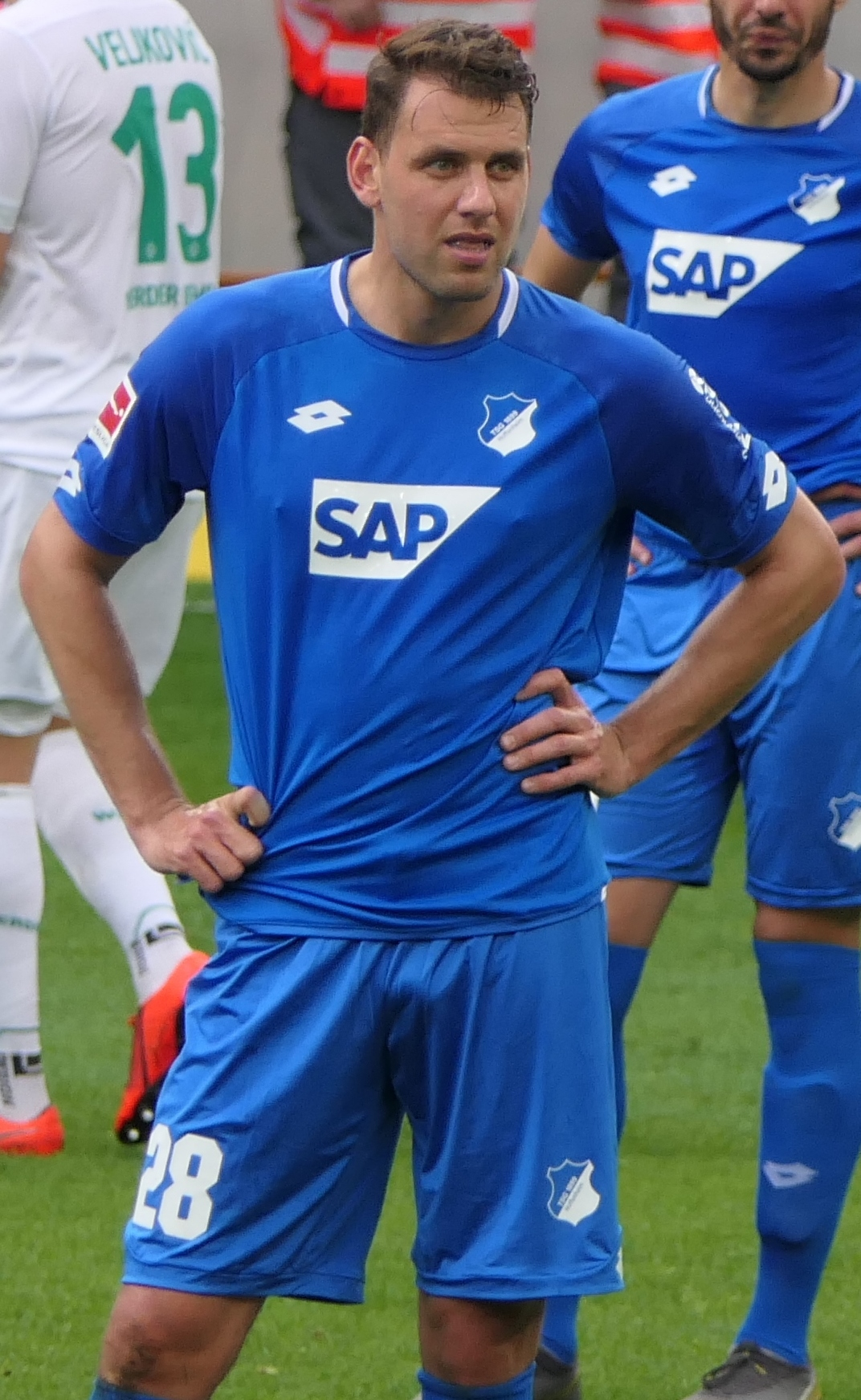
Szalai with TSG Hoffenheim in 2019

On 3 July 2014, Szalai was transferred to Hoffenheim for €6 million. Sporting director Alexander Rosen said that he fitted into the club's style. He made his debut for his new team against Augsburg, opened the scoring in a 2–0 home win and was voted "Player of the Day" on the Bundesliga website.

Szalai was sent off for the first time in his career on 22 November 2014 after committing a foul on Dante in the 90th minute of the league fixture against Bayern Munich at the Allianz Arena, being banned for two matches by the German Football Association. On 12 December, he replaced Anthony Modeste at the hour-mark of a home game with Eintracht Frankfurt; he scored the 2–2 equaliser three minutes later, and in the 87th he provided an assist with his ankle for Roberto Firmino's winner.

On 4 January 2016, after being linked to a host of clubs, Szalai continued in Germany by being loaned out to Hannover 96 for the remainder of the campaign.

=== Return to Mainz ===
On 27 August 2019, Szalai rejoined Mainz on a free transfer and a two-year contract. Mainly a reserve in his second spell at the Mewa Arena, he netted only four times in all competitions.

=== Basel ===
On 16 February 2022, Szalai joined FC Basel until June 2023 after severing his ties with Mainz. He scored on his Swiss Super League debut three days later, in a 3–0 home victory against FC Lausanne-Sport.

Szalai's contract was terminated by mutual consent on 29 January 2023. In July, he announced his retirement aged 35.

== International career ==
Szalai featured regularly with the Hungarian under-21 team. On 11 February 2009, he made his debut with the senior team, replacing Zoltán Szélesi in the 84th minute of a 1–0 friendly loss to Israel. On 8 October of the following year, during a UEFA Euro 2012 qualifier against San Marino at the Ferenc Puskás Stadium, he scored three in an 8–0 rout. Four days later, in the same competition, he contributed another to a 2–1 victory in Finland.

On 29 February 2012, Szalai returned to the national team setup after his one-year injury with a goal against Bulgaria, in a friendly draw in Győr. On 7 September, in the nation's first 2014 FIFA World Cup qualifier, he netted the third for the visitors in an eventual 5–0 win in Andorra.

On 16 October 2012, Szalai helped hosts Hungary battle back to beat Turkey 3–1, scoring the second after an assist from Tamás Kádár.

=== Telki press conference ===
After an 8–1 defeat in the Netherlands for the 2014 World Cup qualification campaign, Szalai took part in a press conference where he gave poignant answers about what he thought the reasons behind the long-term underachievement of the national side were. Subsequently, he found himself on the international wilderness.

On 13 November 2013, Attila Pintér, manager of Hungarian League club Győri ETO FC, reacted to Szalai's statements and doubted his honesty. The coach claimed that the player said in an interview before the loss in Amsterdam that he did not have any problems with Hungary boss Sándor Egervári, further disapproving of him for his irresponsibility of criticising the Hungarian coaches even though he did not know them.

Hungary played its first match of 2014 on 5 March, and Szalai was left out. In an interview with Nemzeti Sport, he said that he could not comment on his future with the national team since he was not invited and he did not have the option to decide whether to join or not.

=== Retirement ===
On 28 August 2014, Pintér selected his list for the Euro 2016 qualifier against Northern Ireland at the Groupama Arena on 7 September, and Szalai was not on it. On 4 September, he posted an announcement on his Facebook profile saying that he did not want to play for his country as long as Pintér was in charge, and thus became the second Hungarian footballer in 20 years to renounce to the national side after Szabolcs Huszti in 2007.

=== Return ===
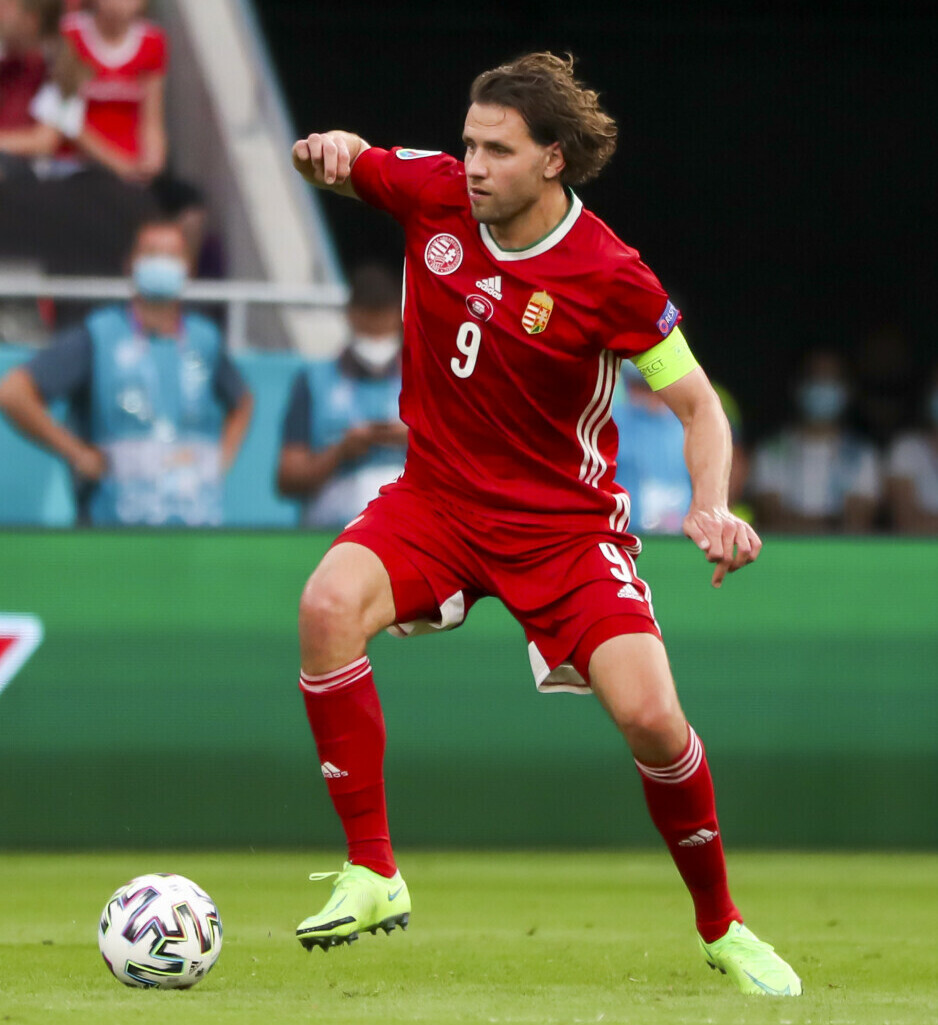
Szalai with Hungary at Euro 2020

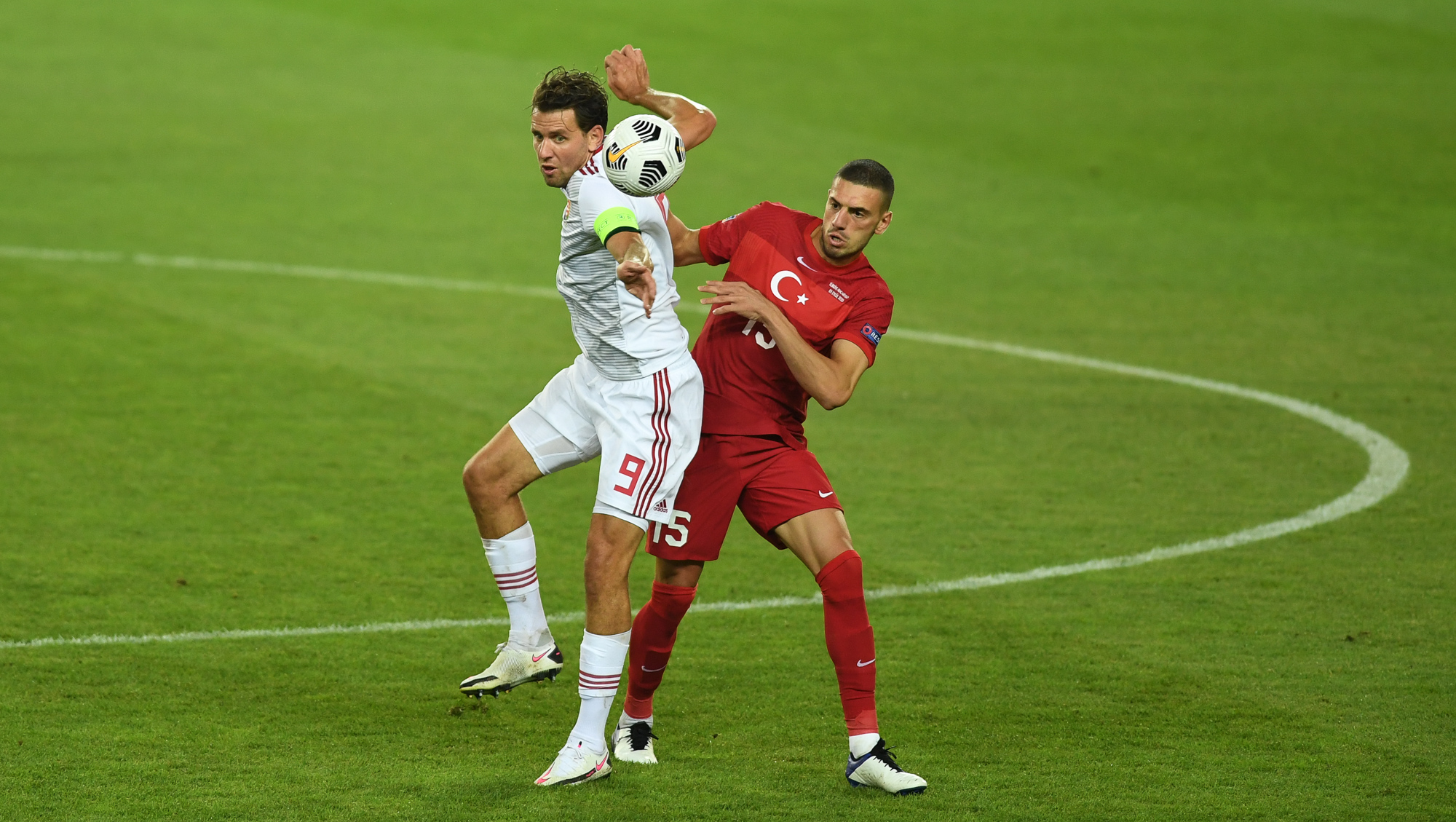
Szalai (left) facing Turkey's Merih Demiral in the 2020–21 UEFA Nations League

On 18 September 2014, Pál Dárdai was appointed as Hungary's interim manager. Eight days later, Szalai announced his return to the national team as the new coach stated the player was one of the side's "leading personalities".

On 11 October 2014, Szalai marked his return by featuring the full 90 minutes in Romania in a 1–1 draw for the Euro 2016 qualifiers. Three days later, in the same competition, he scored the game's only goal for an away win over the Faroe Islands in Tórshavn. After the victorious qualifying play-off match against Norway, he was recorded on video attending a bar in Budapest where fans were celebrating, and after giving a rousing speech about how they suffered the most during the unsuccessful period of Hungarian football, bought 200 shots of pálinka for the people present; the next day, he jokingly noted in a Facebook comment that he did not remember giving a speech.

Szalai was selected for Hungary's Euro 2016 squad. He started and scored the opening goal in their first game in the tournament, a 2–0 defeat of Austria in Bordeaux which marked his first after a 40-match dry spell that lasted over a year; shortly before this happened, the Hungarian fans were chanting the name of fellow striker Dániel Böde, demanding a substitution.

On 10 October 2016, Szalai netted for the third time in the 2018 World Cup qualifying phase, helping to a 2–0 victory in Latvia. In June 2021, he was selected as captain to the final 26-man squad for the rescheduled Euro 2020 tournament, scoring in the final group fixture for a 2–2 draw against Germany where he also assisted András Schäfer.

Szalai announced his retirement for the second time on 21 September 2022, his last match being in the UEFA Nations League against Italy.

== Coaching career ==
In October 2024, Szalai joined Marco Rossi's coaching staff at the Hungarian national team. His first game was a 1–1 home draw against the Netherlands in the Nations League, with player Zsolt Nagy having previously commented that Szalai's addition could be a motivating factor.

In the first half of the reverse Nations League fixture against Netherlands on 16 November 2024, Szalai collapsed on the bench and was subsequently hospitalised. The following day, as his condition had stabilised, he was released.

On 16 October 2025, Szalai completed an international training course for national team players and obtained his UEFA coaching licence.

== Career statistics ==
=== Club ===
Appearances and goals by club, season and competition
| Club | Season | League | | | National cup (Note: Includes DFB-Pokal, Swiss Cup) | | Europe | | Total | |
| Club | Season | Division | Apps | Goals | Apps | Goals | Apps | Goals | Apps | Goals |
|---|---|---|---|---|---|---|---|---|---|---|
| VfB Stuttgart II | 2006–07 | Regionalliga Süd | 33 | 5 | — | | — | | 33 | 5 |
| Real Madrid Castilla | 2007–08 | Segunda División B | 29 | 4 | — | | — | | 29 | 4 |
| Real Madrid Castilla | 2008–09 | Segunda División B | 37 | 16 | — | | — | | 37 | 16 |
| Real Madrid Castilla | 2009–10 | Segunda División B | 13 | 3 | — | | — | | 13 | 3 |
| Real Madrid Castilla | Total | | 79 | 23 | — | | — | | 79 | 23 |
| Mainz 05 | 2009–10 | Bundesliga | 15 | 1 | 0 | 0 | — | | 15 | 1 |
| Mainz 05 | 2010–11 | Bundesliga | 20 | 4 | 2 | 1 | — | | 22 | 5 |
| Mainz 05 | 2011–12 | Bundesliga | 15 | 3 | 0 | 0 | 0 | 0 | 15 | 3 |
| Mainz 05 | 2012–13 | Bundesliga | 29 | 13 | 4 | 2 | — | | 33 | 15 |
| Mainz 05 | Total | | 79 | 21 | 6 | 3 | — | | 85 | 24 |
| Schalke 04 | 2013–14 | Bundesliga | 28 | 7 | 3 | 0 | 9 (Note: Appearances in UEFA Champions League) | 2 | 40 | 9 |
| 1899 Hoffenheim | 2014–15 | Bundesliga | 26 | 4 | 1 | 1 | — | | 27 | 5 |
| 1899 Hoffenheim | 2015–16 | Bundesliga | 4 | 0 | 1 | 0 | — | | 5 | 0 |
| 1899 Hoffenheim | 2016–17 | Bundesliga | 22 | 8 | 1 | 0 | — | | 23 | 8 |
| 1899 Hoffenheim | 2017–18 | Bundesliga | 18 | 5 | 0 | 0 | 2 (Note: One appearance in UEFA Champions League, one appearance in UEFA Europa League) | 0 | 20 | 5 |
| 1899 Hoffenheim | 2018–19 | Bundesliga | 30 | 6 | 2 | 0 | 5 | 0 | 37 | 6 |
| 1899 Hoffenheim | 2019–20 | Bundesliga | 0 | 0 | 1 | 1 | — | | 1 | 1 |
| 1899 Hoffenheim | Total | | 100 | 23 | 6 | 2 | 7 | 0 | 113 | 25 |
| Hannover 96 (loan) | 2015–16 | Bundesliga | 12 | 0 | — | | — | | 12 | 0 |
| Mainz 05 | 2019–20 | Bundesliga | 27 | 1 | — | | — | | 27 | 1 |
| Mainz 05 | 2020–21 | Bundesliga | 18 | 1 | 2 | 1 | — | | 20 | 2 |
| Mainz 05 | 2021–22 | Bundesliga | 12 | 1 | 2 | 0 | — | | 14 | 1 |
| Mainz 05 | Total | | 57 | 3 | 4 | 1 | 0 | 0 | 61 | 4 |
| Basel | 2021–22 | Swiss Super League | 12 | 4 | — | | — | | 12 | 4 |
| Basel | 2022–23 | Swiss Super League | 5 | 0 | 1 | 1 | 6 (Note: Appearances in UEFA Europa Conference League) | 1 | 12 | 2 |
| Basel | Total | | 17 | 4 | 1 | 1 | 6 | 1 | 24 | 6 |
| Career total | | | 405 | 86 | 20 | 7 | 22 | 3 | 447 | 96 |

=== International ===
Appearances and goals by national team and year
| National team | Year | Apps | Goals |
|---|---|---|---|
| Hungary | 2009 | 1 | 0 |
| Hungary | 2010 | 5 | 4 |
| Hungary | 2011 | 0 | 0 |
| Hungary | 2012 | 8 | 3 |
| Hungary | 2013 | 5 | 0 |
| Hungary | 2014 | 4 | 1 |
| Hungary | 2015 | 6 | 0 |
| Hungary | 2016 | 11 | 5 |
| Hungary | 2017 | 2 | 1 |
| Hungary | 2018 | 10 | 5 |
| Hungary | 2019 | 9 | 2 |
| Hungary | 2020 | 6 | 0 |
| Hungary | 2021 | 11 | 4 |
| Hungary | 2022 | 8 | 1 |
| Total | | 86 | 26 |

Scores and results list Hungary's goal tally first, score column indicates score after each Szalai goal.

List of international goals scored by Ádám Szalai
| No. | Date | Venue | Opponent | Score | Result | Competition |
|---|---|---|---|---|---|---|
| 1 | 8 October 2010 | Ferenc Puskás, Budapest, Hungary | San Marino | 2–0 | 8–0 | UEFA Euro 2012 qualifying |
| 2 | 8 October 2010 | Ferenc Puskás, Budapest, Hungary | San Marino | 4–0 | 8–0 | UEFA Euro 2012 qualifying |
| 3 | 8 October 2010 | Ferenc Puskás, Budapest, Hungary | San Marino | 5–0 | 8–0 | UEFA Euro 2012 qualifying |
| 4 | 12 October 2010 | Olympic Stadium, Helsinki, Finland | Finland | 1–0 | 2–1 | UEFA Euro 2012 qualifying |
| 5 | 29 February 2012 | ETO Park, Győr, Hungary | Bulgaria | 1–0 | 1–1 | Friendly |
| 6 | 7 September 2012 | Estadi Comunal, Andorra la Vella, Andorra | Andorra | 3–0 | 5–0 | 2014 FIFA World Cup qualification |
| 7 | 16 October 2012 | Ferenc Puskás, Budapest, Hungary | Turkey | 2–1 | 3–1 | 2014 FIFA World Cup qualification |
| 8 | 14 October 2014 | Torsvollur, Tórshavn, Faroe Islands | Faroe Islands | 1–0 | 1–0 | UEFA Euro 2016 qualifying |
| 9 | 14 June 2016 | Nouveau Stade, Bordeaux, France | Austria | 1–0 | 2–0 | UEFA Euro 2016 |
| 10 | 7 October 2016 | Groupama Arena, Budapest, Hungary | Switzerland | 1–1 | 2–3 | 2018 FIFA World Cup qualification |
| 11 | 7 October 2016 | Groupama Arena, Budapest, Hungary | Switzerland | 2–2 | 2–3 | 2018 FIFA World Cup qualification |
| 12 | 10 October 2016 | Skonto Stadium, Riga, Latvia | Latvia | 2–0 | 2–0 | 2018 FIFA World Cup qualification |
| 13 | 13 November 2016 | Groupama Arena, Budapest, Hungary | Andorra | 4–0 | 4–0 | 2018 FIFA World Cup qualification |
| 14 | 31 August 2017 | Groupama Arena, Budapest, Hungary | Latvia | 2–0 | 3–1 | 2018 FIFA World Cup qualification |
| 15 | 23 March 2018 | Groupama Arena, Budapest, Hungary | Kazakhstan | 1–2 | 2–3 | Friendly |
| 16 | 15 October 2018 | A. Le Coq Arena, Tallinn, Estonia | Estonia | 2–1 | 3–3 | 2018–19 UEFA Nations League C |
| 17 | 15 October 2018 | A. Le Coq Arena, Tallinn, Estonia | Estonia | 3–3 | 3–3 | 2018–19 UEFA Nations League C |
| 18 | 15 November 2018 | Groupama Arena, Budapest, Hungary | Estonia | 2–0 | 2–0 | 2018–19 UEFA Nations League C |
| 19 | 18 November 2018 | Groupama Arena, Budapest, Hungary | Finland | 1–0 | 2–0 | 2018–19 UEFA Nations League C |
| 20 | 24 March 2019 | Groupama Arena, Budapest, Hungary | Croatia | 1–1 | 2–1 | UEFA Euro 2020 qualifying |
| 21 | 15 November 2019 | Puskás Aréna, Budapest, Hungary | Uruguay | 1–2 | 1–2 | Friendly |
| 22 | 25 March 2021 | Puskás Aréna, Budapest, Hungary | Poland | 2–0 | 3–3 | 2022 FIFA World Cup qualification |
| 23 | 28 March 2021 | San Marino Stadium, Serravalle, San Marino | San Marino | 1–0 | 3–0 | 2022 FIFA World Cup qualification |
| 24 | 23 June 2021 | Allianz Arena, Munich, Germany | Germany | 1–0 | 2–2 | UEFA Euro 2020 |
| 25 | 8 September 2021 | Puskás Aréna, Budapest, Hungary | Andorra | 1–0 | 2–1 | 2022 FIFA World Cup qualification |
| 26 | 23 September 2022 | Red Bull Arena, Leipzig, Germany | Germany | 1–0 | 1–0 | 2022–23 UEFA Nations League A |

== Honours ==
Individual

- Hungarian Player of The Year: 2012

== Managerial career ==
In October 2025, he completed the UEFA-MIP course and obtained a UEFA coaching license to manage football teams.
