= Felix Dausend =

German footballer

Personal information
- Date of birth: 1 November 1988 (age 38)
- Place of birth: Saarbrücken, West Germany
- Height: 1.86 m (6 ft 1 in)
- Position: Forward

Youth career
- –2008: SC Halberg Brebach
- 2008–2010: FC Riegelsberg

Senior career*
Years	Team	Apps	(Gls)
2010–2012	SVN Zweibrücken	52	(18)
2012–2013	1. FC Saarbrücken II	15	(3)
2012–2013	1. FC Saarbrücken	10	(0)
2013–2014	SV Elversberg	10	(1)
2014–2015	Borussia Neunkirchen	30	(12)
2015–2016	Saar 05 Saarbrücken	21	(5)
2016–2020	Röchling Völklingen	67	(25)
Total		205	(64)
- * Club domestic league appearances and goals

Felix Dausend (born 1 November 1988) is a German former professional footballer who played as a forward.

== Career ==
Dausend began his professional career with 1. FC Saarbrücken, for whom he signed in January 2012. He made his 3. Liga debut three months later, as a substitute for Lukas Kohler in a 3–2 win over Kickers Offenbach. After eighteen months with Saarbrücken, he signed for SV Elversberg, who had just been promoted to the 3. Liga. He was released by Elversberg in January 2014 and signed for Borussia Neunkirchen.
