= Shawn Parker =

German footballer

Personal information
- Date of birth: 7 March 1993 (age 33)
- Place of birth: Wiesbaden, Germany
- Height: 1.79 m (5 ft 10 in)
- Position: Forward

Youth career
- SV Wiesbaden
- FC Bierstadt
- –2005: SV Wehen
- 2005–2011: Mainz 05

Senior career*
Years	Team	Apps	(Gls)
2011–2013	Mainz 05 II	42	(8)
2012–2014	Mainz 05	27	(4)
2014–2018	FC Augsburg	10	(0)
2014–2018	FC Augsburg II	11	(3)
2016–2017	→ 1. FC Nürnberg (loan)	6	(1)
2016	→ 1. FC Nürnberg II (loan)	1	(0)
2018–2020	Greuther Fürth	5	(1)
2019–2020	Greuther Fürth II	8	(0)
Total		110	(17)

International career
2008	Germany U15	1	(0)
2008–2009	Germany U16	10	(5)
2009–2010	Germany U17	11	(8)
2010–2011	Germany U18	7	(4)
2011–2012	Germany U19	13	(6)
2012–2013	Germany U20	2	(2)
2013	Germany U21	2	(0)
- * Club domestic league appearances and goals

Shawn Parker (born 7 March 1993) is a German former professional footballer who played as a forward.

== Club career ==
=== Mainz 05 ===
Parker made his Bundesliga debut on 27 October 2012 as a late substitute against Hoffenheim. On his starting debut, he contributed a goal and an assist in a 3–1 win against Eintracht Frankfurt. He scored four goals in 27 league appearances for Mainz.

=== FC Augsburg ===
On 1 July 2014, Parker transferred to Bundesliga club FC Augsburg and signed a four-year deal.

=== Greuther Fürth ===
In August 2018, Parker joined 2. Bundesliga side Greuther Fürth having agreed a two-year deal with the club.

On 31 January 2020, the last day of the 2019–20 winter transfer period, he agreed the termination of his contract with Greuther Fürth.

Parker retired in 2020.

== International career ==
Parker has appeared for Germany at the under-15, under-16, under-17, under-18, under-19, under-20, and under-21 levels but still remains eligible for the United States due to having an American father. In 2012, it was revealed that United States manager Jürgen Klinsmann had spoken to Parker about representing the United States in the future. Speaking on his international preference, Parker said, "It is a hard decision to make of course. One should be very proud to play for the country your father is from. I am playing for Germany now and this is my home base. Both sides are very interesting. I like Germany now, but I won’t rule out that I will play for the United States in the future."

== Personal life ==
Parker was born in Wiesbaden to a German mother and an African American serviceman father, who settled in Germany after serving in the military. Parker briefly lived in Virginia in the U.S. before moving back to Germany. He has two younger brothers, Devante and Jermaine, who are part of the Mainz 05 youth teams.

== Career statistics ==
=== Club ===
Appearances and goals by club, season and competition
Club	Season	League			DFB-Pokal		Other		Total	
Club	Season	Division	Apps	Goals	Apps	Goals	Apps	Goals	Apps	Goals
Mainz 05 II	2011–12	Regionalliga West	27	4	—		—		27	4
Mainz 05 II	2012–13	Regionalliga West	10	4	—		—		10	4
Mainz 05 II	2013–14	Regionalliga West	5	0	—		—		5	0
Mainz 05 II	Total		42	8	0	0	0	0	42	8
Mainz 05	2012–13	Bundesliga	16	3	2	1	—		18	4
Mainz 05	2013–14	Bundesliga	11	1	1	0	—		12	1
Mainz 05	Total		27	4	3	1	0	0	30	5
FC Augsburg II	2014–15	Regionalliga Bayern	2	0	—		—		2	0
FC Augsburg II	2015–16	Regionalliga Bayern	4	2	—		—		4	2
FC Augsburg II	2016–17	Regionalliga Bayern	1	0	—		—		1	0
FC Augsburg II	2017–18	Regionalliga Bayern	4	1	—		—		4	1
FC Augsburg II	Total		11	3	0	0	0	0	11	3
FC Augsburg	2014–15	Bundesliga	8	0	1	0	—		9	0
FC Augsburg	2015–16	Bundesliga	0	0	0	0	1 (Note: Appearance in the UEFA Europa League)	0	1	0
FC Augsburg	2016–17	Bundesliga	0	0	0	0	—		0	0
FC Augsburg	2017–18	Bundesliga	2	0	0	0	—		2	0
FC Augsburg	Total		10	0	1	0	1	0	12	0
1. FC Nürnberg II (loan)	2016–17	Regionalliga Bayern	1	0	—		—		1	0
1. FC Nürnberg (loan)	2016–17	2. Bundesliga	6	1	0	0	—		6	1
Greuther Fürth II	2018–19	Regionalliga Bayern	1	0	—		—		1	0
Greuther Fürth II	2019–20	Regionalliga Bayern	7	0	—		—		7	0
Greuther Fürth II	Total		8	0	—		–		8	0
Greuther Fürth	2018–19	2. Bundesliga	5	1	0	0	—		5	1
Greuther Fürth	2019–20	2. Bundesliga	0	0	0	0	—		0	0
Greuther Fürth	Total		5	1	0	0	0	0	5	1
Career total			110	17	4	1	1	0	115	18
