= Eugen Gopko =

German footballer

Personal information
- Full name: Eugen Gopko
- Date of birth: 5 January 1991 (age 35)
- Place of birth: Kolchyno, Ukrainian SSR, Soviet Union
- Height: 1.70 m (5 ft 7 in)
- Position: Right back

Team information
- Current team: TSG Pfeddersheim
- Number: 8

Youth career
- –2004: Dynamo Kyiv
- 2005: FSV Osthofen
- 2005–2006: TuS Neuhausen
- 2006–2009: 1. FSV Mainz 05

Senior career*
Years	Team	Apps	(Gls)
2009–2012	Mainz 05 II	51	(4)
2009–2012	Mainz 05	2	(0)
2012–2019	Wormatia Worms	129	(1)
2019–	TSG Pfeddersheim	9	(0)

International career
2009	Germany U19	1	(0)
- * Club domestic league appearances and goals as of 21:41, 27 October 2019 (UTC)

Eugen Gopko (born 5 January 1991) is a professional footballer who plays as a midfielder for TSG Pfeddersheim. Born in Ukraine, he has represented Germany at youth level.
