= Niko Bungert =

German footballer

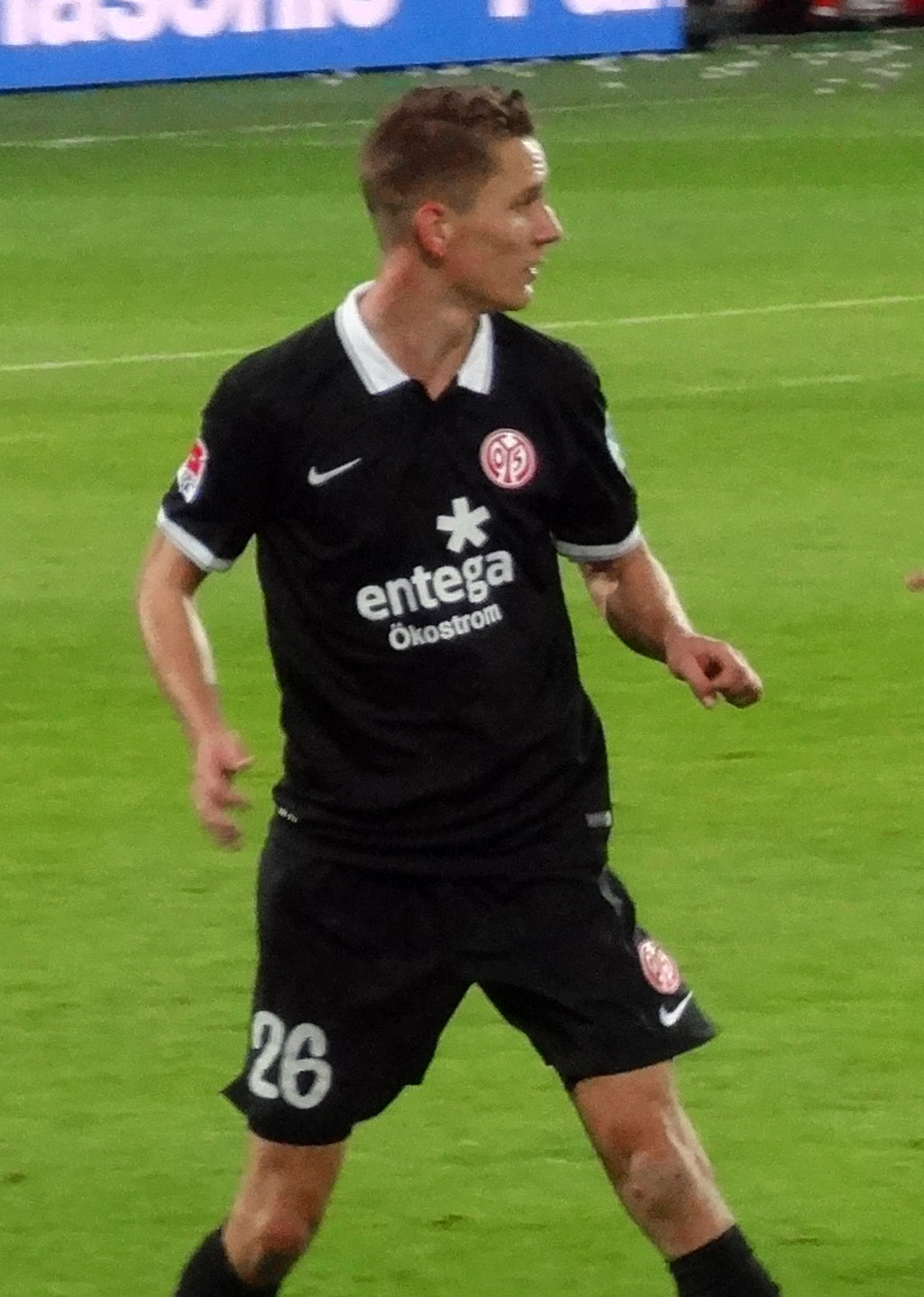

Personal information
- Full name: Niko Bungert
- Date of birth: 24 October 1986 (age 40)
- Place of birth: Bochum, West Germany
- Height: 1.88 m (6 ft 2 in)
- Position: Centre-back

Team information
- Current team: Mainz 05 (staff)

Youth career
- 1989–1996: VfB Günnigfeld
- 1996–2004: SG Wattenscheid 09
- 2004–2005: Schalke 04

Senior career*
Years	Team	Apps	(Gls)
2005–2006	Schalke 04 II	25	(4)
2006–2008	Kickers Offenbach	52	(1)
2008–2019	Mainz 05	198	(9)
2010–2016	Mainz 05 II	4	(1)

International career
2008	Germany U21	3	(0)

Managerial career
- 2019–2020: Mainz 05 (assistant)
- 2021: Mainz 05 (assistant)
- 2024: Mainz 05 (assistant)
- * Club domestic league appearances and goals

Niko Bungert (born 24 October 1986) is a retired German footballer who played as a defender.

He was also a member of the German U-21 team. He was part of the Schalke youth team that won the Youth DFB-Pokal in 2005.

== Career ==
=== Coaching career ===
After Bungert chose to hang up his boots after the 2018-19 season, he joined Mainz 05 as part of a trainee program to work at the club. At the end of November 2019, Bungert joined newly appointed head coach Achim Beierlorzer's staff, where he would act as assistant coach. He returned to his trainee program in July 2020.

On August 15, 2021, Bungert had to step in as deputy assistant coach ahead of a match against RB Leipzig, as head coach Bo Svensson's two assistants were both in COVID-19 quarantine. Mainz sensationally won 1-0 with a reserve team, as a large part of the squad was in quarantine. In November 2021, Bungert became the club's first ever Club Ambassador.

On January 1, 2024, Bungert was again promoted to the role of assistant coach, this time under Jan Siewert. After the end of the season, Mainz announced that Bungert would not be an assistant coach in the new season and would take on another, unnamed, role at the club.
