= Nikolče Noveski =

Macedonian footballer

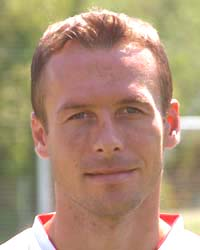

Personal information
- Full name: Nikolče Noveski; Николче Новески
- Date of birth: 28 April 1979 (age 47)
- Place of birth: Bitola, SFR Yugoslavia
- Height: 1.90 m (6 ft 3 in)
- Position: Centre-back

Senior career*
Years	Team	Apps	(Gls)
1997–1998	Pelister	12	(1)
1998–1999	Hansa Rostock	1	(0)
2001–2004	Erzgebirge Aue	92	(10)
2004–2015	Mainz 05	315	(12)
Total		420	(23)

International career
2004–2013	Macedonia	64	(5)
- * Club domestic league appearances and goals

Nikolče Noveski (Macedonian: Николче Новески; born 28 April 1979) is a Macedonian former professional footballer who played as a centre-back. He spent most of his career in Germany amassing over 300 league appearances with 1. FSV Mainz 05.

== Club career ==
Noveski was born in Bitola, SR Macedonia, SFR Yugoslavia.

He scored two goals for Mainz in 2005–06 season and is a first team player. During Mainz's 2005–06 UEFA Cup run he also played six times.

Noveski played a big part in Mainz's ninth-place finish during the 2009–10 season as he played in 33 out of a possible 34 games. He was also a captain of Mainz's squad.

Noveski scored six own goals in the Bundesliga which made him the leading "own goal scorer" in the Bundesliga history, together with Manfred Kaltz.

== International career ==
He made his senior debut for Macedonia in a November 2004 FIFA World Cup qualification match against the Czech Republic and has earned a total of 64 caps, scoring 5 goals making him one of the 10 most capped Macedonia players of all time. His final international was an October 2013 World Cup qualifier against Serbia.

=== International goals ===
Scores and results list Macedonia's goal tally first.

#	Date	Venue	Opponent	Score	Minute	Competition
1.	11 October 2006	Estadi Comunal, Andorra la Vella, Andorra	Andorra	3–0	16'	Euro 2008 Qualifying
2.	6 February 2008	Philip II Arena, Skopje, Republic of Macedonia	Serbia	1–1	58'	Friendly
3.	11 October 2011	Philip II Arena, Skopje, Republic of Macedonia	Slovakia	1–1	79'	Euro 2012 Qualifying
4.	12 October 2012	Hampden Park, Glasgow, Scotland	Scotland	1–1	11'	World Cup 2014 Qualifying
5.	6 February 2013	Philip II Arena, Skopje, Republic of Macedonia	Denmark	3–0	24'	Friendly
