= Christian Wetklo =

German footballer (born 1980)

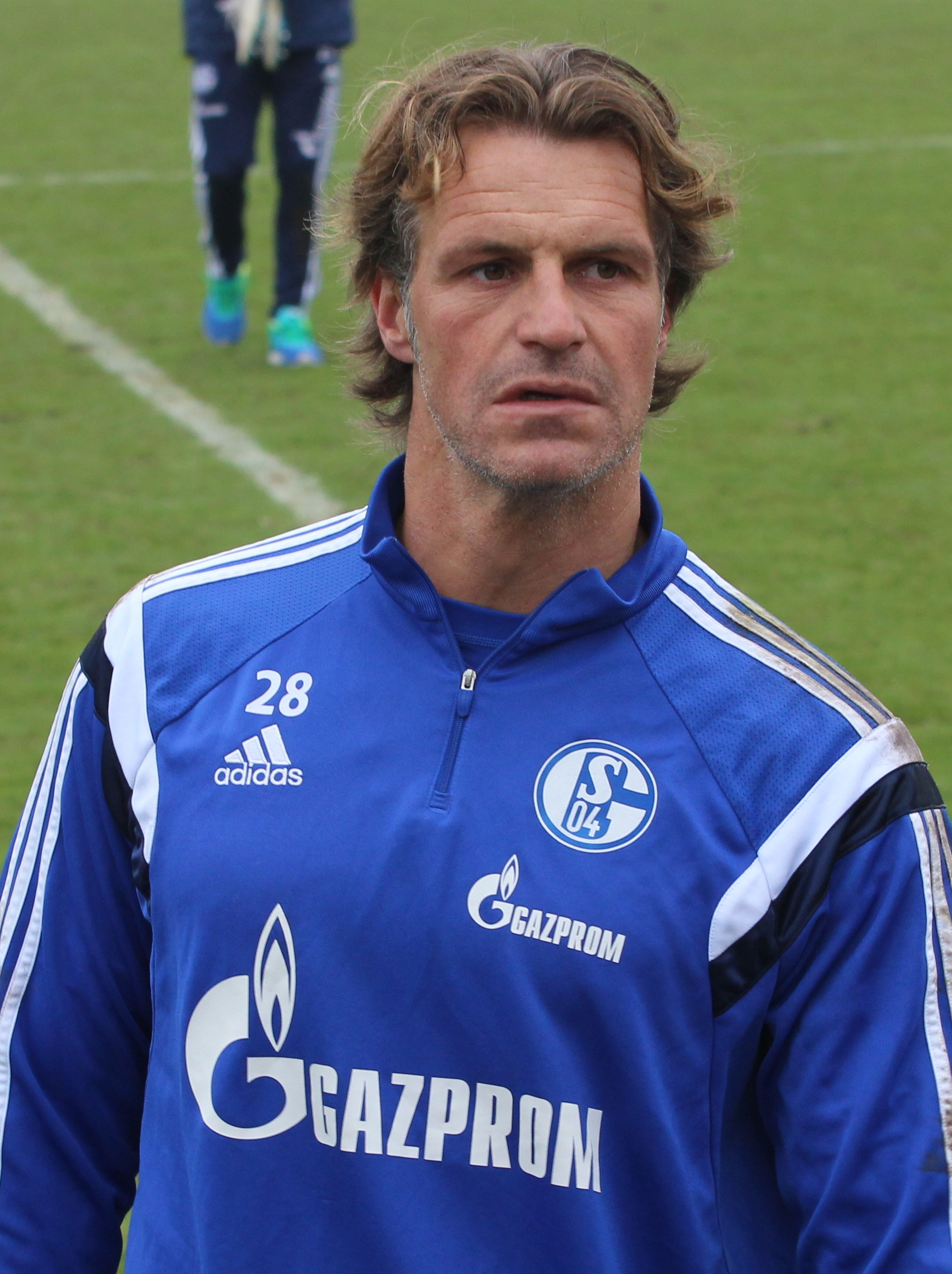
- Wetklo with Schalke in 2015

Personal information
- Full name: Christian Wetklo
- Date of birth: 11 January 1980 (age 46)
- Place of birth: Marl, NRW, West Germany
- Height: 1.90 m (6 ft 3 in)
- Position: Goalkeeper

Team information
- Current team: Schalke 04 II (goalkeeping coach)

Youth career
- 1985–1988: DJK Armina Hassel
- 1988–1995: SC Hassel
- 1995–1998: Schalke 04

Senior career*
Years	Team	Apps	(Gls)
1999–2000	Rot-Weiss Essen		
2000–2014	Mainz 05 II	124	(0)
2003–2014	Mainz 05	124	(0)
2014	Darmstadt 98	0	(0)
2014–2015	Schalke 04	0	(0)
2015–2017	Schalke 04 II	14	(0)
Total		262	(0)

International career
	Germany U17	6	(0)
- * Club domestic league appearances and goals

Christian Wetklo (born 11 January 1980) is a German former professional footballer who played as a goalkeeper. He is currently the goalkeeping coach of Schalke 04 II. He made his professional debut in the Bundesliga for Mainz 05 on 19 February 2005, when he came on as a half time substitute in a game against Arminia Bielefeld.

== Career statistics ==
Appearances and goals by club, season and competition
Club	Season	League			DFB-Pokal		Continental		Total	
Club	Season	Division	Apps	Goals	Apps	Goals	Apps	Goals	Apps	Goals
Mainz 05 II	2000–01	Oberliga Südwest	27	0	0	0	—		27	0
Mainz 05 II	2001–02	Oberliga Südwest	30	0	1	0	—		31	0
Mainz 05 II	2002–03	Oberliga Südwest	19	0	0	0	—		19	0
Mainz 05 II	2003–04	Oberliga Südwest	22	0	1	0	—		23	0
Mainz 05 II	2004–05	Regionalliga Süd	10	0	1	0	—		11	0
Mainz 05 II	2005–06	Oberliga Südwest	5	0	1	0	—		6	0
Mainz 05 II	2006–07	Oberliga Südwest	2	0	0	0	—		2	0
Mainz 05 II	2007–08	Oberliga Südwest	1	0	0	0	—		1	0
Mainz 05 II	2008–09	Regionalliga West	4	0	0	0	—		4	0
Mainz 05 II	2009–10	Regionalliga West	3	0	0	0	—		3	0
Mainz 05 II	2013–14	Regionalliga Südwest	1	0	0	0	—		1	0
Mainz 05 II	Total		124	0	4	0	—		128	0
Mainz 05	2002–03	2. Bundesliga	0	0	1	0	—		1	0
Mainz 05	2003–04	2. Bundesliga	0	0	0	0	—		0	0
Mainz 05	2004–05	Bundesliga	7	0	0	0	—		7	0
Mainz 05	2005–06	Bundesliga	15	0	1	0	—		16	0
Mainz 05	2006–07	Bundesliga	8	0	0	0	—		8	0
Mainz 05	2007–08	2. Bundesliga	9	0	1	0	—		10	0
Mainz 05	2008–09	2. Bundesliga	1	0	0	0	—		1	0
Mainz 05	2009–10	Bundesliga	5	0	0	0	—		4	0
Mainz 05	2010–11	Bundesliga	24	0	2	0	—		26	0
Mainz 05	2011–12	Bundesliga	22	0	2	0	1 (Note: Appearance in UEFA Europa League)	0	25	0
Mainz 05	2012–13	Bundesliga	31	0	3	0	—		34	0
Mainz 05	2013–14	Bundesliga	2	0	1	0	—		3	0
Mainz 05	Total		124	0	11	0	1	0	136	0
Schalke 04	2014–15	Bundesliga	0	0	0	0	—		0	0
Schalke 04	2015–16	Bundesliga	0	0	0	0	0	0	0	0
Schalke 04	Total		0	0	0	0	0	0	0	0
Schalke 04 II	2015–16	Regionalliga West	14	0	—		—		14	0
Schalke 04 II	2016–17	Regionalliga West	0	0	—		—		0	0
Schalke 04 II	Total		14	0	—		—		14	0
Career total			262	0	15	0	1	0	278	0
