= Bo Svensson =

Danish footballer and manager (born 1979)

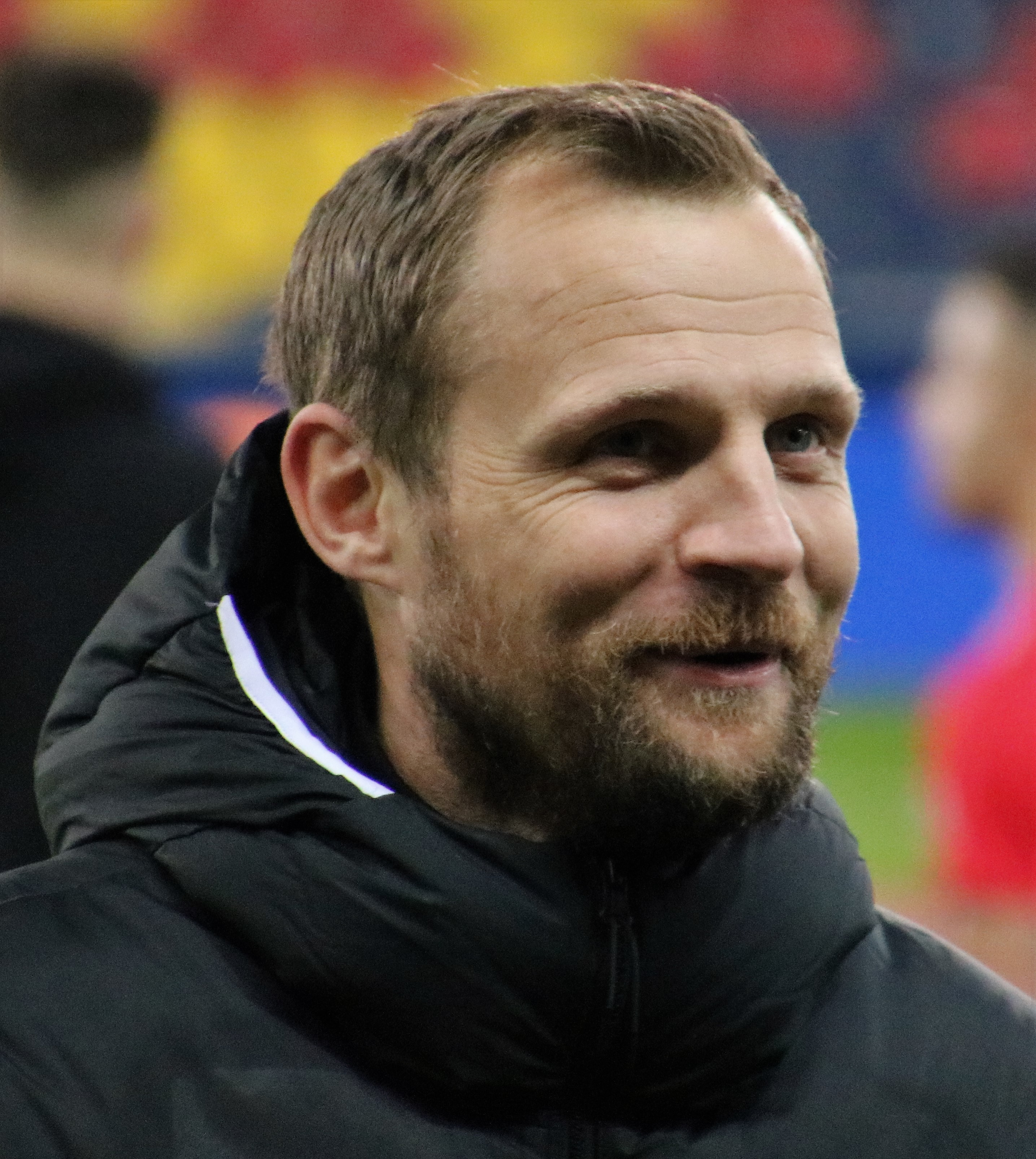
- Svensson in 2020

Personal information
- Date of birth: 4 August 1979 (age 47)
- Place of birth: Skørping, Denmark
- Height: 1.90 m (6 ft 3 in)
- Position: Central defender

Youth career
- KB

Senior career*
Years	Team	Apps	(Gls)
1999–2006	Copenhagen	150	(4)
2006–2007	Borussia Mönchengladbach	32	(2)
2007–2014	Mainz 05	109	(1)
Total		291	(7)

International career
2000	Denmark U-21	2	(0)
2006–2011	Denmark	3	(0)

Managerial career
- 2019–2021: FC Liefering
- 2021–2023: Mainz 05
- 2024: Union Berlin
- 2026–: Copenhagen
- * Club domestic league appearances and goals

Bo Svensson (born 4 August 1979) is a Danish professional football manager and former player who played as a defender. He is currently the head coach of Copenhagen.

During his playing career, Svensson made three appearances for the Denmark national team.

== Playing career ==
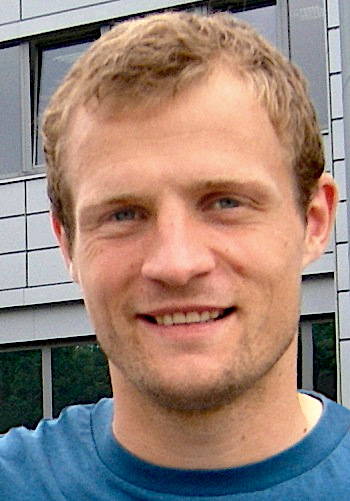
Svensson in 2006

Svensson was born in Skørping, Northern Jutland. He started playing youth football with Copenhagen club KB, the reserve team of Copenhagen (FCK). He moved from KB into the FCK squad in June 1999, and got his FCK debut in September 1999, under FCK manager Kim Brink. He was soon a FCK regular team member, and was called up for the Danish under-21 national team in March 2000.

With FCK, he won the 2001 Danish Superliga championship under manager Roy Hodgson, and the 2003 Superliga under manager Hans Backe. When FCK team captain Peter Nielsen retired in winter 2003, Bo Svensson was given the captain's armband. He went on to captain FCK when they won the Double, of both 2004 Superliga and Danish Cup titles. The 2004–05 season was less successful, but FCK managed to win the inaugural 2005 Royal League tournament. In the summer break 2005, Hans Backe demoted Svensson to vice-captain, as the captain status was given to the Swedish international midfielder Tobias Linderoth. With his FCK contract running out one year later, in the summer 2006, Svensson looked for a new club, and left FCK in the winter break 2005. He played a total of 196 official games for FCK.

He moved abroad when he was sold to German team Borussia Mönchengladbach in January 2006. He debuted for Mönchengladbach in February 2006 and finished the season playing 13 of Mönchengladbach's last 15 games, under manager Horst Köppel. He was called up for the Danish national team, and made his debut in May 2006, under national manager Morten Olsen.

In summer 2007 he was transferred to Mainz 05. After the 2013–14 season he retired from professional football.

== Coaching career ==
After retiring from professional football, Svensson started his coaching career as an assistant coach for his old club, Mainz 05. In June 2015, he became a youth coach for the club. In 2017 Svensson, took over the under 19 squad of Mainz.

In 2019, he became the head coach of FC Liefering in the 2. Liga in Austria. The team is known for being a feeder club for Austrian side Red Bull Salzburg. Under his leadership, the young team finished the 2019–20 season in third place. They also were successful in the beginning of the 2020–21 season, being in second place after 13 games.

On 4 January 2021, Svensson became the new head coach of his former club Mainz 05 in the Bundesliga. He managed a nearly impossible task, leading them out of relegation zone by the end of the 2020–21 season, during the second half of which they harvested a sensational 32 points. In the following two seasons, he successfully secured his team's position on the top half of the Bundesliga table, with Mainz constantly being a strong competitor for the Europa Conference League qualification. He held the position as manager until stepping down by mutual consent on 2 November 2023, after the team entered the new season with nine winless league games. In May 2024 it was announced that Svensson would take over the head coaching role of Union Berlin for the start of the 2024–25 season, a position he only held until December 2024.

On 30 March 2026, he was hired as the head coach of Copenhagen to replace Jacob Neestrup, who had left the day earlier by mutual consent. At the time the club had missed the championship playoff group for the first time in club history and were at the time 8th in the table. In his first match Copenhagen beat Silkeborg IF 7–0, which is the joint biggest win in Superliga history.

== Managerial statistics ==
As of match played 22 November 2026

Managerial record by team and tenure
Team	From	To	Record				
Team	From	To	G	W	D	L	Win %
FC Liefering	12 July 2019	4 January 2021	43	23	11	9	53.49
Mainz 05	4 January 2021	2 November 2023	105	38	27	40	36.19
Union Berlin	1 July 2024	27 December 2024	17	5	5	7	29.41
Copenhagen	30 March 2026	present	36	26	6	4	72.22
Total			201	92	49	60	45.77

== Honours ==
- Danish Superliga: 2001, 2003, 2004 and 2006
- Danish Cup: 2004
- Danish Super Cup: 2001, 2004
- Royal League: 2005 and 2006
