= List of German football transfers summer 2014 =

This is a list of German football transfers in the summer transfer window 2014 by club. Only transfers of the Bundesliga, and 2. Bundesliga are included.

== Bundesliga ==
=== Bayern Munich ===
In:

Out:

Note: Flags indicate national team as has been defined under FIFA eligibility rules. Players may hold more than one non-FIFA nationality.

No.	Pos.	Nation	Player
3	MF	ESP	Xabi Alonso (from Real Madrid)
5	DF	MAR	Mehdi Benatia (from A.S. Roma)
9	FW	POL	Robert Lewandowski (from Borussia Dortmund)
16	MF	GER	Gianluca Gaudino (from Bayern Munich U19)
18	DF	ESP	Juan Bernat (from Valencia CF)
20	MF	GER	Sebastian Rode (from Eintracht Frankfurt)
23	GK	ESP	Pepe Reina (from Liverpool, previously on loan at S.S.C. Napoli)
24	FW	GER	Sinan Kurt (from Borussia Mönchengladbach II)

No.	Pos.	Nation	Player
5	DF	BEL	Daniel van Buyten (retired)
9	FW	CRO	Mario Mandžukić (to Atlético Madrid)
26	DF	GER	Diego Contento (to Girondins de Bordeaux)
32	GK	GER	Lukas Raeder (to Vitória de Setúbal)
36	MF	AUT	Alessandro Schöpf (to 1. FC Nürnberg)
37	FW	USA	Julian Green (on loan to Hamburger SV)
39	MF	GER	Toni Kroos (to Real Madrid)

=== Borussia Dortmund ===
In:

No.	Pos.	Nation	Player
7	MF	JPN	Shinji Kagawa (from Manchester United)
9	FW	ITA	Ciro Immobile (from Torino F.C.)
18	MF	TUR	Nuri Şahin (from Real Madrid, previously on loan)
20	FW	COL	Adrián Ramos (from Hertha BSC)
23	FW	KOR	Ji Dong-won (from FC Augsburg)
28	DF	GER	Matthias Ginter (from SC Freiburg)

Out:

No.	Pos.	Nation	Player
2	DF	GER	Manuel Friedrich (to Mumbai City FC)
7	MF	GER	Jonas Hofmann (on loan to 1. FSV Mainz 05)
9	FW	POL	Robert Lewandowski (to Bayern Munich)
23	FW	GER	Julian Schieber (to Hertha BSC)
34	FW	GER	Marvin Ducksch (on loan to SC Paderborn 07)

=== FC Schalke 04 ===
In:

No.	Pos.	Nation	Player
13	FW	CMR	Eric Maxim Choupo-Moting (from 1. FSV Mainz 05)
15	DF	GER	Dennis Aogo (from Hamburger SV, previously on loan)
18	MF	GER	Sidney Sam (from Bayer Leverkusen)
27	MF	SUI	Tranquillo Barnetta (loan return from Eintracht Frankfurt)
28	GK	GER	Christian Wetklo (from SV Darmstadt 98)
34	GK	GER	Fabian Giefer (from Fortuna Düsseldorf)

Out:

No.	Pos.	Nation	Player
2	DF	GER	Tim Hoogland (to Fulham F.C.)
14	DF	GRE	Kyriakos Papadopoulos (on loan to Bayer Leverkusen)
28	FW	HUN	Ádám Szalai (to 1899 Hoffenheim)
31	MF	GER	Philipp Max (to Karlsruher SC)
34	GK	GER	Timo Hildebrand (released)
40	MF	GHA	Anthony Annan (released)
--	GK	GER	Lars Unnerstall (to Fortuna Düsseldorf, previously on loan at FC Aarau)
--	FW	GER	Philipp Hofmann (to 1. FC Kaiserslautern, previously on loan at FC Ingolstadt 04)

=== Bayer 04 Leverkusen ===
In:

No.	Pos.	Nation	Player
9	FW	SUI	Josip Drmić (from 1. FC Nürnberg)
10	MF	TUR	Hakan Çalhanoğlu (from Hamburger SV)
14	DF	GRE	Kyriakos Papadopoulos (on loan from FC Schalke 04)
16	DF	CRO	Tin Jedvaj (on loan from AS Roma)
18	DF	BRA	Wendell (from Grêmio)
25	GK	CRO	Dario Krešić (from 1. FSV Mainz 05)
35	MF	UKR	Vladlen Yurchenko (from FC Shakhtar Donetsk)
38	MF	GER	Karim Bellarabi (loan return from Eintracht Braunschweig)
--	FW	FIN	Joel Pohjanpalo (from HJK Helsinki, previously on loan; previously on loan at VfR Aalen)

Out:

No.	Pos.	Nation	Player
2	DF	GRE	Kostas Stafylidis (on loan to Fulham F.C.)
4	DF	GER	Philipp Wollscheid (on loan to 1. FSV Mainz 05)
9	FW	SUI	Eren Derdiyok (loan return to 1899 Hoffenheim)
10	MF	GER	Emre Can (to Liverpool F.C.)
13	MF	GER	Jens Hegeler (to Hertha BSC)
18	MF	GER	Sidney Sam (to FC Schalke 04)
20	DF	MEX	Andrés Guardado (loan return to Valencia CF)
24	FW	KOR	Ryu Seung-woo (on loan to Eintracht Braunschweig)
25	GK	ESP	Andrés Palop (retired)
30	DF	GER	Malcolm Cacutalua (on loan to SpVgg Greuther Fürth)
32	MF	GER	Jonas Meffert (to Karlsruher SC)
37	MF	GER	Maximilian Wagener (on loan to VfL Osnabrück)
--	DF	GER	Danny da Costa (to FC Ingolstadt 04, previously on loan)
--	FW	POL	Arkadiusz Milik (on loan to AFC Ajax, previously on loan at FC Augsburg)
--	FW	FIN	Joel Pohjanpalo (on loan to Fortuna Düsseldorf, previously on loan at VfR Aalen)
--	DF	GER	Malcolm Cacutalua (on loan to VfL Bochum, previously on loan at SpVgg Greuther Fürth)

=== VfL Wolfsburg ===
In:

No.	Pos.	Nation	Player
3	FW	DEN	Nicklas Bendtner (free agent)
10	MF	GER	Aaron Hunt (from Werder Bremen)
23	DF	FRA	Josuha Guilavogui (on loan from Atlético Madrid, previously on loan at AS Saint-Étienne)
24	DF	GER	Sebastian Jung (from Eintracht Frankfurt)
28	MF	POL	Mateusz Klich (from PEC Zwolle)

Out:

No.	Pos.	Nation	Player
6	MF	SRB	Slobodan Medojević (to Eintracht Frankfurt)
24	FW	GER	Kevin Scheidhauer (to MSV Duisburg)
29	MF	CZE	Jan Polák (to 1. FC Nürnberg)
30	FW	GER	Stefan Kutschke (to SC Paderborn 07)
32	MF	GER	Willi Evseev (to 1. FC Nürnberg)
--	MF	GER	Tolga Ciğerci (to Hertha BSC, previously on loan)
--	FW	SUI	Nassim Ben Khalifa (to Grasshopper Club Zürich, previously on loan)
--	FW	CZE	Václav Pilař (on loan to Viktoria Plzeň, previously on loan at SC Freiburg)
--	FW	SWE	Rasmus Jönsson (to Aalborg BK, previously on loan)
--	FW	CIV	Ibrahim Sissoko (to Eskişehirspor, previously on loan at Deportivo La Coruña)

=== Borussia Mönchengladbach ===
In:

No.	Pos.	Nation	Player
1	GK	SUI	Yann Sommer (from FC Basel)
8	FW	GUI	Ibrahima Traoré (from VfB Stuttgart)
19	DF	USA	Fabian Johnson (from 1899 Hoffenheim)
26	MF	BEL	Thorgan Hazard (on loan from Chelsea F.C.)
28	MF	GER	André Hahn (from FC Augsburg)
35	DF	GER	Marvin Schulz (from Borussia Mönchengladbach U19)

Out:

No.	Pos.	Nation	Player
1	GK	GER	Marc-André ter Stegen (to FC Barcelona)
8	MF	GER	Lukas Rupp (to SC Paderborn 07)
9	FW	NED	Luuk de Jong (to PSV Eindhoven)
18	MF	VEN	Juan Arango (to Club Tijuana)
22	FW	GER	Peniel Mlapa (on loan to 1. FC Nürnberg)
25	MF	GER	Amin Younes (on loan to 1.FC Kaiserslautern)
--	FW	GER	Elias Kachunga (to SC Paderborn 07, previously on loan)
--	DF	GER	Matthias Zimmermann (to Borussia Mönchengladbach II, previously on loan at SV Sandhausen)

=== 1. FSV Mainz 05 ===
In:

No.	Pos.	Nation	Player
1	GK	GRE	Stefanos Kapino (from Panathinaikos F.C.)
2	DF	CHI	Gonzalo Jara (from Nottingham Forest F.C.)
3	DF	GER	Philipp Wollscheid (on loan from Bayer 04 Leverkusen)
10	MF	SRB	Filip Đuričić (on loan from S.L. Benfica)
11	FW	TUN	Sami Allagui (on loan from Hertha BSC)
15	MF	ARG	Pablo De Blasis (from Asteras Tripolis F.C.)
17	MF	ESP	Jairo (from Sevilla)
18	MF	GER	Daniel Brosinski (from SpVgg Greuther Fürth)
31	MF	GER	Jonas Hofmann (on loan from Borussia Dortmund)
37	FW	AUS	Nikita Rukavytsya (loan return from FSV Frankfurt)
--	MF	GER	Chinedu Ede (loan return from 1. FC Kaiserslautern)

Out:

No.	Pos.	Nation	Player
2	DF	DEN	Bo Svensson (retired)
3	DF	CZE	Zdeněk Pospěch (to SFC Opava)
3	MF	GER	Chinedu Ede (on loan to Anorthosis Famagusta FC)
7	MF	DEN	Niki Zimling (on loan to Ajax Amsterdam)
9	FW	GER	Sebastian Polter (on loan to 1. FC Union Berlin)
10	FW	CMR	Eric Maxim Choupo-Moting (to FC Schalke 04)
15	GK	CRO	Dario Krešić (to Bayer Leverkusen)
18	FW	GER	Dani Schahin (on loan to SC Freiburg)
27	FW	GER	Nicolai Müller (to Hamburger SV)
29	GK	GER	Christian Wetklo (to SV Darmstadt 98)
30	DF	GER	Malik Fathi (released)
31	FW	GER	Shawn Parker (to FC Augsburg)
33	GK	GER	Heinz Müller (released)

=== FC Augsburg ===
In:

No.	Pos.	Nation	Player
8	MF	GER	Markus Feulner (from 1. FC Nürnberg)
9	FW	GER	Shawn Parker (from 1. FSV Mainz 05)
12	DF	GHA	Baba Rahman (from SpVgg Greuther Fürth)
23	FW	SLO	Tim Matavž (from PSV Eindhoven)
30	FW	BRA	Caiuby (from FC Ingolstadt 04)
34	FW	SRB	Nikola Đurđić (from SpVgg Greuther Fürth)
36	MF	ITA	Max Reinthaler (from Rydaholms GoIF)
--	FW	GER	Mathias Fetsch (loan return from Energie Cottbus)

Out:

No.	Pos.	Nation	Player
6	MF	GER	Kevin Vogt (to 1. FC Köln)
8	MF	AUT	Raphael Holzhauser (loan return to VfB Stuttgart)
9	FW	POL	Arkadiusz Milik (loan return to Bayer Leverkusen)
16	MF	GER	Andreas Ottl (released)
19	DF	GER	Matthias Ostrzolek (to Hamburger SV)
22	FW	GER	Mathias Fetsch (on loan to Dynamo Dresden)
24	FW	KOR	Ji Dong-won (to Borussia Dortmund)
28	MF	GER	André Hahn (to Borussia Mönchengladbach)
30	GK	MAR	Mohamed Amsif (to 1. FC Union Berlin)
34	FW	GER	Bajram Nebihi (to 1. FC Union Berlin)
--	FW	BFA	Aristide Bancé (released, previously on loan at Fortuna Düsseldorf)

=== 1899 Hoffenheim ===
In:

No.	Pos.	Nation	Player
1	GK	GER	Oliver Baumann (from SC Freiburg)
4	DF	BIH	Ermin Bičakčić (from Eintracht Braunschweig)
16	MF	SUI	Pirmin Schwegler (from Eintracht Frankfurt)
17	FW	SUI	Steven Zuber (from CSKA Moscow)
20	DF	KOR	Kim Jin-su (from Albirex Niigata)
26	FW	GER	Janik Haberer (from SpVgg Unterhaching)
28	FW	HUN	Ádám Szalai (from FC Schalke 04)
--	FW	ZIM	Knowledge Musona (loan return from Kaizer Chiefs)

Out:

No.	Pos.	Nation	Player
4	DF	GER	Stefan Thesker (to Hannover 96)
16	DF	USA	Fabian Johnson (to Borussia Mönchengladbach)
22	MF	BRA	Bruno Nazário (on loan to Lechia Gdańsk)
26	GK	GER	Tim Paterok (to Wormatia Worms)
28	DF	NED	Edson Braafheid (to S.S. Lazio)
33	DF	GER	Robin Szarka (to Energie Cottbus)
34	FW	TUR	Kenan Karaman (to Hannover 96)
40	MF	USA	Joseph-Claude Gyau (to Borussia Dortmund II)
--	FW	SUI	Eren Derdiyok (to Kasımpaşa, previously on loan at Bayer Leverkusen)
--	FW	AUT	Michael Gregoritsch (on loan to VfL Bochum, previously on loan at FC St. Pauli)
--	MF	LIE	Sandro Wieser (on loan to FC Aarau, previously on loan at SV Ried)
--	FW	ESP	Joselu (to Hannover 96, previously on loan at Eintracht Frankfurt)
--	MF	ITA	Vincenzo Grifo (on loan to FSV Frankfurt, previously on loan at Dynamo Dresden)
--	MF	GER	Andreas Ludwig (to VfR Aalen, previously on loan at TSV 1860 München)
--	MF	PER	Júnior Ponce (on loan to Vitória F.C., previously on loan at Alianza Lima)
--	FW	SRB	Filip Malbašić (on loan to Lechia Gdańsk, previously on loan at FK Partizan)
--	MF	GER	Tobias Weis (on loan to VfL Bochum, previously on loan at Eintracht Frankfurt)

=== Hannover 96 ===
In:

No.	Pos.	Nation	Player
3	DF	CHI	Miiko Albornoz (from Malmö FF)
6	MF	TUR	Ceyhun Gülselam (from Galatasaray)
11	FW	ESP	Joselu (from 1899 Hoffenheim, previously on loan at Eintracht Frankfurt)
17	DF	GER	Stefan Thesker (from 1899 Hoffenheim)
18	DF	LTU	Marius Stankevičius (from Gaziantepspor)
21	FW	FRA	Jimmy Briand (from Olympique Lyonnais)
26	FW	TUR	Kenan Karaman (from 1899 Hoffenheim)
27	MF	GER	Vladimir Ranković (from Bayern Munich II)
28	MF	JPN	Hiroshi Kiyotake (from 1. FC Nürnberg)
39	GK	AUT	Robert Almer (from Energie Cottbus)
--	GK	AUT	Samuel Radlinger (loan return from Rapid Wien)

Out:

No.	Pos.	Nation	Player
6	DF	USA	Steven Cherundolo (retired)
10	MF	HUN	Szabolcs Huszti (to Changchun Yatai F.C.)
11	FW	CIV	Didier Ya Konan (to Ittihad FC)
16	FW	LAT	Artjoms Rudņevs (loan return to Hamburger SV)
18	DF	BEL	Sébastien Pocognoli (to West Bromwich Albion)
21	GK	GER	Konstantin Fuhry (to SC Freiburg II)
22	DF	CZE	František Rajtoral (loan return to FC Viktoria Plzeň)
23	GK	AUT	Samuel Radlinger (on loan to 1. FC Nürnberg)
23	DF	GER	Christopher Avevor (to Fortuna Düsseldorf)
35	DF	AZE	Ali Gökdemir (to Simurq PIK)
39	FW	SEN	Mame Biram Diouf (to Stoke City F.C.)
40	FW	BIH	Almir Kasumović (to BSV Schwarz-Weiß Rehden)
--	MF	SUI	Adrian Nikçi (on loan to BSC Young Boys, previously on loan at FC Thun)

=== Hertha BSC ===
In:

No.	Pos.	Nation	Player
3	MF	NOR	Per Ciljan Skjelbred (from Hamburger SV)
5	DF	NED	John Heitinga (from Fulham F.C.)
11	FW	CIV	Salomon Kalou (from Lille OSC)
13	MF	GER	Jens Hegeler (from Bayer Leverkusen)
14	MF	SUI	Valentin Stocker (from FC Basel)
16	FW	GER	Julian Schieber (from Borussia Dortmund)
17	MF	GER	Tolga Ciğerci (from VfL Wolfsburg, previously on loan)
21	DF	GER	Marvin Plattenhardt (from 1. FC Nürnberg)
24	MF	JPN	Genki Haraguchi (from Urawa Red Diamonds)
27	FW	NED	Roy Beerens (from AZ Alkmaar)
--	DF	GER	Felix Bastians (loan return from VfL Bochum)

Out:

No.	Pos.	Nation	Player
3	DF	GEO	Levan Kobiashvili (retired)
5	DF	GER	Maik Franz (released)
11	FW	TUN	Sami Allagui (on loan to 1. FSV Mainz 05)
13	MF	NOR	Per Ciljan Skjelbred (loan return to Hamburger SV)
20	FW	COL	Adrián Ramos (to Borussia Dortmund)
24	MF	GER	Peer Kluge (to Arminia Bielefeld)
32	MF	GER	Fabian Holland (on loan to SV Darmstadt 98)
41	DF	GER	Felix Bastians (released)
--	FW	GER	Pierre-Michel Lasogga (to Hamburger SV, previously on loan)
--	MF	ISR	Ben Sahar (to Willem II, previously on loan at Arminia Bielefeld)

=== Werder Bremen ===
In:

No.	Pos.	Nation	Player
2	DF	ARG	Santiago García (from US Palermo, previously on loan)
4	DF	ESP	Álex Gálvez (from Rayo Vallecano)
14	MF	BIH	Izet Hajrović (from Galatasaray)
22	MF	GER	Fin Bartels (from FC St. Pauli)
40	GK	GER	Raif Husić (from Bayern Munich II)

Out:

No.	Pos.	Nation	Player
1	GK	GER	Sebastian Mielitz (to SC Freiburg)
10	MF	TUR	Mehmet Ekici (to Trabzonspor)
13	DF	GER	Lukas Schmitz (to Fortuna Düsseldorf)
14	MF	GER	Aaron Hunt (to VfL Wolfsburg)
17	MF	SRB	Aleksandar Ignjovski (to Eintracht Frankfurt)
29	DF	GER	Cimo Röcker (to Hannover 96 II)
31	MF	SRB	Predrag Stevanović (released)
33	FW	POL	Martin Kobylański (on loan to 1. FC Union Berlin)
34	MF	SRB	Aleksandar Stevanović (released)
--	FW	GER	Johannes Wurtz (to SpVgg Greuther Fürth, previously on loan at SC Paderborn 07)
--	FW	GER	Niclas Füllkrug (to 1. FC Nürnberg, previously on loan at SpVgg Greuther Fürth)
--	FW	NGR	Joseph Akpala (to Kardemir Karabükspor, previously on loan)

=== Eintracht Frankfurt ===
In:

No.	Pos.	Nation	Player
9	FW	SUI	Haris Seferovic (from Real Sociedad)
11	FW	PAR	Nelson Valdez (from Al Jazira Club, previously on loan at Olympiacos F.C.)
19	FW	BRA	Lucas Piazon (on loan form Chelsea, previously on loan at Vitesse Arnhem)
20	MF	JPN	Makoto Hasebe (from 1. FC Nürnberg)
22	DF	USA	Timothy Chandler (from 1. FC Nürnberg)
25	MF	SRB	Slobodan Medojević (from VfL Wolfsburg)
26	GK	GER	Timo Hildebrand (free agent)
27	MF	SRB	Aleksandar Ignjovski (from Werder Bremen)
31	DF	GER	David Kinsombi (from 1. FSV Mainz 05 youth)

Out:

No.	Pos.	Nation	Player
9	FW	ESP	Joselu (loan return to 1899 Hoffenheim)
17	MF	PHI	Stephan Schröck (to SpVgg Greuther Fürth)
20	MF	GER	Sebastian Rode (to Bayern Munich)
22	DF	GER	Stefano Celozzi (to VfL Bochum)
24	DF	GER	Sebastian Jung (to VfL Wolfsburg)
25	MF	SUI	Tranquillo Barnetta (loan return to FC Schalke 04)
26	MF	GER	Tobias Weis (loan return to 1899 Hoffenheim)
27	MF	SUI	Pirmin Schwegler (to 1899 Hoffenheim)
36	DF	GER	Marc-Oliver Kempf (to SC Freiburg)
--	MF	GER	Marvin Bakalorz (to SC Paderborn 07, previously on loan)

=== SC Freiburg ===
In:

No.	Pos.	Nation	Player
1	GK	SUI	Roman Bürki (from Grasshopper Club Zürich)
3	DF	ESP	Marc Torrejón (from 1. FC Kaiserslautern)
8	MF	GER	Mike Frantz (from 1. FC Nürnberg)
11	FW	GER	Dani Schahin (on loan from 1. FSV Mainz 05)
14	FW	SUI	Admir Mehmedi (from Dynamo Kyiv, previously on loan)
15	DF	SRB	Stefan Mitrović (from S.L. Benfica, previously on loan at Real Valladolid)
20	DF	GER	Marc-Oliver Kempf (from Eintracht Frankfurt)
21	GK	GER	Sebastian Mielitz (from Werder Bremen)
22	DF	GER	Sascha Riether (from Fulham F.C.)
32	DF	SLO	Denis Perger (loan return from Wehen Wiesbaden)

Out:

No.	Pos.	Nation	Player
1	GK	GER	Oliver Baumann (to 1899 Hoffenheim)
3	DF	SEN	Fallou Diagné (to Stade Rennais F.C.)
4	MF	SUI	Gelson Fernandes (to Stade Rennais F.C.)
6	DF	NOR	Vegar Eggen Hedenstad (on loan to Eintracht Braunschweig)
8	MF	CZE	Václav Pilař (loan return to VfL Wolfsburg)
9	FW	GER	Mike Hanke (to Guizhou Renhe F.C.)
11	FW	GER	Hendrick Zuck (on loan to Eintracht Braunschweig)
20	MF	FRA	Francis Coquelin (loan return to FC Arsenal)
21	GK	GER	Alexander Schwolow (on loan to Arminia Bielefeld)
22	FW	GER	Marco Terrazzino (to VfL Bochum)
28	DF	GER	Matthias Ginter (to Borussia Dortmund)
--	MF	GER	Marc Lais (to Chemnitzer FC, previously on loan)

=== VfB Stuttgart ===
In:

No.	Pos.	Nation	Player
13	MF	ESP	Oriol Romeu (on loan from Chelsea F.C., previously on loan at Valencia CF)
16	DF	AUT	Florian Klein (from FC Red Bull Salzburg)
18	MF	SRB	Filip Kostić (from FC Groningen)
21	MF	CZE	Adam Hloušek (from 1. FC Nürnberg)
26	MF	AUT	Raphael Holzhauser (loan return from FC Augsburg)
33	FW	GER	Daniel Ginczek (from 1. FC Nürnberg)
--	MF	DEN	William Kvist (loan return from Fulham F.C.)

Out:

No.	Pos.	Nation	Player
4	MF	DEN	William Kvist (to Wigan Athletic F.C.)
13	MF	GER	Patrick Funk (to Wehen Wiesbaden)
14	MF	NZL	Marco Rojas (on loan to SpVgg Greuther Fürth)
15	DF	CIV	Arthur Boka (to Málaga CF)
16	FW	GUI	Ibrahima Traoré (to Borussia Mönchengladbach)
18	FW	GER	Cacau (to Cerezo Osaka)
28	MF	GER	Rani Khedira (to RB Leipzig)
--	FW	FRA	Johan Audel (to FC Nantes, previously on loan)
--	DF	GER	Michael Vitzthum (to 1. FC Heidenheim, previously on loan at Karlsruher SC)

=== Hamburger SV ===
In:

No.	Pos.	Nation	Player
3	DF	BRA	Cléber (from Corinthians)
5	DF	SUI	Johan Djourou (from Arsenal, previously on loan)
10	FW	GER	Pierre-Michel Lasogga (from Hertha BSC, previously on loan)
14	MF	GER	Lewis Holtby (on loan from Tottenham Hotspur)
16	FW	LAT	Artjoms Rudņevs (loan return from Hannover 96)
17	MF	HUN	Zoltán Stieber (from SpVgg Greuther Fürth)
21	MF	SUI	Valon Behrami (from S.S.C. Napoli)
22	DF	GER	Matthias Ostrzolek (from FC Augsburg)
24	MF	GER	Matti Steinmann (from Hamburger SV II)
27	FW	GER	Nicolai Müller (from 1. FSV Mainz 05)
33	MF	GER	Gideon Jung (from Rot-Weiß Oberhausen)
37	FW	USA	Julian Green (on loan from Bayern Munich)
40	MF	SRB	Gojko Kačar (loan return from Cerezo Osaka)
--	MF	NOR	Per Ciljan Skjelbred (loan return from Hertha BSC)

Out:

No.	Pos.	Nation	Player
3	DF	ENG	Michael Mancienne (to Nottingham Forest)
6	MF	NED	Ouasim Bouy (loan return to Juventus)
6	MF	NOR	Per Ciljan Skjelbred (to Hertha BSC)
8	MF	VEN	Tomás Rincón (to Genoa C.F.C.)
9	MF	TUR	Hakan Çalhanoğlu (to Bayer Leverkusen)
14	MF	CRO	Milan Badelj (to Fiorentina)
16	DF	GER	Lasse Sobiech (on loan to FC St. Pauli)
17	MF	GER	Zhi-Gin Lam (to SpVgg Greuther Fürth)
18	MF	TUR	Kerem Demirbay (on loan to 1. FC Kaiserslautern)
25	FW	NED	Ola John (loan return to S.L. Benfica)
28	DF	GER	Jonathan Tah (on loan to Fortuna Düsseldorf)
29	GK	GER	Florian Stritzel (to Karlsruher SC)
30	GK	GER	Sven Neuhaus (retired)
31	FW	CMR	Jacques Zoua (on loan to Kayseri Erciyesspor)
37	MF	GER	Robert Tesche (released)
--	DF	GER	Dennis Aogo (to FC Schalke 04, previously on loan)

=== 1. FC Köln ===
In:

No.	Pos.	Nation	Player
3	DF	CZE	Tomáš Kalas (on loan from Chelsea F.C.)
6	MF	GER	Kevin Vogt (from FC Augsburg)
13	FW	JPN	Yuya Osako (from TSV 1860 München)
16	DF	POL	Paweł Olkowski (from Górnik Zabrze)
17	MF	POL	Sławomir Peszko (from Parma F.C., previously on loan)
19	DF	ALB	Mërgim Mavraj (from SpVgg Greuther Fürth)
23	FW	GER	Simon Zoller (from 1.FC Kaiserslautern)
29	MF	SVK	Dušan Švento (from Red Bull Salzburg)
37	GK	GER	Daniel Mesenhöler (from 1.FC Köln II)

Out:

No.	Pos.	Nation	Player
6	DF	BRA	Bruno Nascimento (on loan to G.D. Estoril Praia)
7	MF	MAR	Adil Chihi (to Fulham F.C.)
15	MF	GER	Maximilian Thiel (on loan to 1. FC Union Berlin)
21	MF	GER	Sascha Bigalke (released)
23	DF	CAN	Kevin McKenna (retired)
27	FW	GER	Maurice Exslager (on loan to SV Darmstadt 98)
30	MF	GER	Fabian Schnellhardt (to MSV Duisburg)
35	DF	GER	Koray Kacinoglu (released)
--	FW	POL	Kacper Przybyłko (to SpVgg Greuther Fürth, previously on loan at Arminia Bielefeld)
--	MF	CRO	Mato Jajalo (released, previously on loan at FK Sarajevo)

=== SC Paderborn 07 ===
In:

No.	Pos.	Nation	Player
3	DF	ESP	Rafa (from Getafe)
4	MF	GER	Lukas Rupp (from Borussia Mönchengladbach)
6	MF	GER	Marvin Bakalorz (from Eintracht Frankfurt, previously on loan)
9	FW	GER	Stefan Kutschke (from VfL Wolfsburg)
11	MF	GER	Moritz Stoppelkamp (from TSV 1860 München)
15	FW	GER	Elias Kachunga (from Borussia Mönchengladbach, previously on loan)
24	FW	GER	Viktor Maier (from SV Lippstadt 08)
27	MF	ALG	Idir Ouali (from Dynamo Dresden)
34	FW	GER	Marvin Ducksch (on loan from Borussia Dortmund)

Out:

No.	Pos.	Nation	Player
9	FW	NED	Rick ten Voorde (on loan to FC Dordrecht)
11	FW	GER	Saliou Sané (on loan to Holstein Kiel)
16	FW	GER	Johannes Wurtz (loan return to Werder Bremen)
29	MF	GER	Sebastian Schonlau (on loan to SC Verl)
--	MF	GER	Manuel Zeitz (to Energie Cottbus, previously on loan at 1. FC Saarbrücken)
--	DF	GER	Fabian Scheffer (released, previously on loan at FC Carl Zeiss Jena)

== 2. Bundesliga ==
=== 1. FC Nürnberg ===
In:

No.	Pos.	Nation	Player
3	DF	NOR	Even Hovland (from Molde FK)
4	DF	NED	Dave Bulthuis (from FC Utrecht)
5	DF	GER	Jürgen Mössmer (from VfR Aalen)
7	MF	GER	Danny Blum (from SV Sandhausen)
8	MF	CZE	Jan Polák (from VfL Wolfsburg)
11	FW	SVK	Jakub Sylvestr (from Erzgebirge Aue)
15	FW	GER	Robert Koch (from Dynamo Dresden)
18	MF	GER	Willi Evseev (from VfL Wolfsburg)
19	MF	PHI	Mike Ott (from 1860 München II)
20	DF	TUR	Özgür Özdemir (from Eintracht Frankfurt youth)
23	FW	POR	Daniel Candeias (on loan from S.L. Benfica)
24	FW	GER	Niclas Füllkrug (from Werder Bremen, previously on loan to Greuther Fürth)
26	DF	CZE	Ondřej Čelůstka (free agent, previously on loan to Sunderland from Trabzonspor)
27	MF	GER	Markus Mendler (loan return from SV Sandhausen)
28	MF	AUT	Alessandro Schöpf (from Bayern Munich)
29	DF	ECU	Cristian Ramírez (on loan from Fortuna Düsseldorf)
32	GK	AUT	Samuel Radlinger (on loan from Hannover 96, previously on loan to Rapid Wien)
34	FW	GER	Peniel Mlapa (on loan from Borussia Mönchengladbach)

Out:

No.	Pos.	Nation	Player
2	DF	AUT	Emanuel Pogatetz (released, then to Columbus Crew)
3	DF	SWE	Per Nilsson (to F.C. Copenhagen)
5	MF	GER	Hanno Balitsch (released, then to FSV Frankfurt)
6	DF	SUI	Martin Angha (to 1860 Munich)
7	MF	GER	Markus Feulner (to FC Augsburg)
9	FW	CZE	Tomáš Pekhart (to FC Ingolstadt)
11	FW	GER	Daniel Ginczek (to VfB Stuttgart)
13	MF	JPN	Hiroshi Kiyotake (to Hannover 96)
14	MF	SVK	Robert Mak (to PAOK FC)
15	MF	JPN	Makoto Hasebe (to Eintracht Frankfurt)
17	FW	CRO	Antonio Čolak (on loan to Lechia Gdańsk)
17	MF	GER	Mike Frantz (to SC Freiburg)
18	FW	SUI	Josip Drmić (to Bayer Leverkusen)
20	MF	ESP	José Campaña (loan return to Crystal Palace, then to Sampdoria)
21	FW	POL	Mariusz Stępiński (on loan to Wisła Kraków)
21	DF	GER	Marvin Plattenhardt (to Hertha BSC)
23	MF	CZE	Adam Hloušek (to VfB Stuttgart)
24	DF	GER	Berkay Dabanlı (to Eskişehirspor)
26	DF	USA	Timothy Chandler (to Eintracht Frankfurt)
32	GK	GER	Benjamin Uphoff (on loan to VfB Stuttgart II)
34	MF	GER	Sebastian Gärtner (to Mainz 05 II)
36	MF	TUR	Sinan Tekerci (to Dynamo Dresden)

=== Eintracht Braunschweig ===
In:

No.	Pos.	Nation	Player
2	DF	NOR	Vegar Eggen Hedenstad (on loan from SC Freiburg)
3	DF	SUI	Saulo Decarli (from Livorno, previously on loan at A.S. Avellino 1912)
13	MF	GER	Raffael Korte (loan return from 1. FC Saarbrücken)
14	FW	KOR	Ryu Seung-woo (on loan from Bayer 04 Leverkusen)
23	FW	NOR	Mushaga Bakenga (on loan from Club Brugge, previously on loan at Esbjerg)
30	FW	GER	Hendrick Zuck (on loan from SC Freiburg)
33	GK	POL	Rafał Gikiewicz (from Śląsk Wrocław)

Out:

No.	Pos.	Nation	Player
3	DF	BIH	Ermin Bičakčić (to 1899 Hoffenheim)
12	FW	COD	Dominick Kumbela (to Karabükspor)
14	MF	NOR	Omar Elabdellaoui (to Olympiacos F.C.)
17	MF	GER	Kevin Kratz (to SV Sandhausen)
23	MF	GER	Jonas Erwig-Drüppel (to Jahn Regensburg)
24	MF	GER	Timo Perthel (to VfL Bochum)
26	GK	IRI	Daniel Davari (to Grasshopper Club Zürich)
33	MF	GER	Marco Caligiuri (to SpVgg Greuther Fürth)
38	MF	GER	Karim Bellarabi (loan return to Bayer Leverkusen)

=== SpVgg Greuther Fürth ===
In:

No.	Pos.	Nation	Player
5	DF	GER	Florian Mohr (from FC St. Pauli)
6	DF	BRA	Guilherme Sityá (on loan from Petrolul Ploiești)
10	MF	PHI	Stephan Schröck (from Eintracht Frankfurt)
13	DF	GER	Marco Caligiuri (free agent)
18	MF	NZL	Marco Rojas (on loan from VfB Stuttgart)
20	FW	AUT	Robert Žulj (from Red Bull Salzburg)
21	FW	POL	Kacper Przybyłko (from 1. FC Köln, previously on loan at Arminia Bielefeld)
22	FW	GER	Johannes Wurtz (from Werder Bremen, previously on loan at SC Paderborn 07)
23	FW	GER	Marco Stiepermann (from Energie Cottbus)
24	GK	CRO	Miro Varvodić (free agent)
26	MF	GER	Zhi-Gin Lam (from Hamburger SV)
28	DF	TUR	Orkan Çınar (from VfL Wolfsburg youth)
--	DF	GER	Malcolm Cacutalua (on loan from Bayer Leverkusen)

Out:

No.	Pos.	Nation	Player
4	DF	GER	Kevin Kraus (to 1. FC Heidenheim)
4	DF	GER	Malcolm Cacutalua (to VfL Bochum)
5	DF	ALB	Mërgim Mavraj (to 1. FC Köln)
6	MF	FIN	Tim Sparv (to FC Midtjylland)
7	MF	HUN	Zoltán Stieber (to Hamburger SV)
9	FW	SRB	Ognjen Mudrinski (released)
10	FW	SRB	Nikola Đurđić (to FC Augsburg)
11	FW	GER	Dominick Drexler (to VfR Aalen)
13	MF	POL	Sebastian Tyrała (to Rot-Weiß Erfurt)
18	DF	GHA	Baba Rahman (to FC Augsburg)
20	MF	GER	Daniel Brosinski (to 1. FSV Mainz 05)
22	FW	GER	Niclas Füllkrug (loan return to Werder Bremen)
37	FW	GER	Daniel Steininger (on loan to Jahn Regensburg)
--	DF	GER	Michael Hefele (to Dynamo Dresden, previously on loan at Wacker Burghausen)

=== 1. FC Kaiserslautern ===
In:

No.	Pos.	Nation	Player
3	DF	GER	Tim Heubach (from FSV Frankfurt)
7	DF	GER	Michael Schulze (from Energie Cottbus)
8	FW	MNE	Stefan Mugoša (from FK Mladost Podgorica)
10	FW	GER	Philipp Hofmann (from FC Schalke 04, previously on loan at FC Ingolstadt 04)
17	MF	GER	André Fomitschow (from Fortuna Düsseldorf, previously on loan at Energie Cottbus)
18	MF	TUR	Kerem Demirbay (on loan from Hamburger SV)
28	MF	GER	Amin Younes (on loan from Borussia Mönchengladbach)

Out:

No.	Pos.	Nation	Player
2	DF	CZE	Jan Šimůnek (to VfL Bochum)
5	MF	KOS	Enis Alushi (to FC St. Pauli)
9	FW	GER	Simon Zoller (to 1. FC Köln)
10	FW	SUI	Albert Bunjaku (to FC St. Gallen)
14	MF	GER	Chinedu Ede (loan return to 1. FSV Mainz 05)
15	DF	ESP	Marc Torrejón (to SC Freiburg)
22	GK	GER	David Hohs (to 1. FC Saarbrücken)
28	MF	GRE	Konstantinos Fortounis (to Olympiacos F.C.)
--	FW	GER	Richard Sukuta-Pasu (to Cercle Brugge, previously on loan at VfL Bochum)
--	MF	POL	Ariel Borysiuk (on loan to Lechia Gdańsk, previously on loan at FC Volga Nizhny Novgorod).
--	DF	TUN	Enis Hajri (to MSV Duisburg, previously on loan at FC 08 Homburg)
--	MF	AUT	Christopher Drazan (on loan to LASK Linz, previously on loan at Rot-Weiß Erfurt)
--	FW	USA	Andrew Wooten (to SV Sandhausen, previously on loan at FSV Frankfurt)

=== Karlsruher SC ===
In:

No.	Pos.	Nation	Player
7	MF	GER	Sascha Traut (from VfR Aalen)
9	MF	JPN	Hiroki Yamada (from Júbilo Iwata)
22	DF	GER	Enrico Valentini (from VfR Aalen)
23	MF	GER	Jonas Meffert (from Bayer Leverkusen)
25	GK	GER	Florian Stritzel (from Hamburger SV)
31	DF	GER	Philipp Max (from FC Schalke 04)

Out:

No.	Pos.	Nation	Player
16	FW	GER	Dennis Mast (on loan to Arminia Bielefeld)
20	DF	GER	Michael Vitzthum (loan return to VfB Stuttgart)
22	DF	GER	Sebastian Schiek (released)
25	MF	GER	Sven Mende (to Hamburger SV II)
29	FW	GER	Jimmy Marton (to SpVgg Unterhaching)

=== Fortuna Düsseldorf ===
In:

No.	Pos.	Nation	Player
2	DF	GER	Jonathan Tah (on loan from Hamburger SV)
4	DF	GER	Julian Schauerte (from SV Sandhausen)
5	DF	GER	Christopher Avevor (from Hannover 96)
15	DF	GER	Lukas Schmitz (from Werder Bremen)
19	GK	GER	Lars Unnerstall (from FC Schalke 04, previously on loan at FC Aarau)
20	FW	FIN	Joel Pohjanpalo (on loan from Bayer Leverkusen, previously on loan at VfR Aalen)
24	MF	POR	Sérgio Pinto (from Levante UD)
35	FW	NED	Charlison Benschop (from Stade Brestois 29, previously on loan)

Out:

No.	Pos.	Nation	Player
2	DF	ECU	Cristian Ramírez (on loan to 1. FC Nürnberg)
15	MF	CRO	Ivan Paurević (to FC Ufa)
22	FW	GRE	Giannis Gianniotas (on loan to Asteras Tripolis)
28	DF	CZE	Martin Latka (to Slavia Prague)
29	MF	TUR	Aliosman Aydin (to KFC Uerdingen 05)
30	FW	BFA	Aristide Bancé (loan return to FC Augsburg)
33	GK	GER	Fabian Giefer (to FC Schalke 04)
--	FW	JPN	Genki Omae (to Shimizu S-Pulse, previously on loan)
--	MF	GER	André Fomitschow (to 1. FC Kaiserslautern, previously on loan at Energie Cottbus)
--	FW	GER	Gerrit Wegkamp (to Bayern Munich II, previously on loan at MSV Duisburg)

=== 1860 Munich ===
In:

No.	Pos.	Nation	Player
7	MF	RSA	Daylon Claasen (from Lech Poznań)
8	FW	BRA	Leonardo (from Ferencvárosi TC)
9	FW	ESP	Rodri (from FC Barcelona B)
10	MF	ESP	Edu Bedia (from FC Barcelona B)
13	MF	ESP	Ilie Sánchez (from FC Barcelona B)
18	DF	SUI	Martin Angha (from 1. FC Nürnberg)
19	FW	AUT	Rubin Okotie (from Austria Wien, previously on loan at SønderjyskE)
20	FW	ALB	Valdet Rama (free agent)
24	GK	GER	Stefan Ortega (from Arminia Bielefeld)
25	DF	URU	Gary Kagelmacher (from AS Monaco, previously on loan at Valenciennes FC)

Out:

No.	Pos.	Nation	Player
1	GK	HUN	Gábor Király (to Fulham F.C.)
8	MF	GER	Andreas Ludwig (loan return to 1899 Hoffenheim)
9	FW	JPN	Yuya Osako (to 1. FC Köln)
10	MF	GER	Moritz Stoppelkamp (to SC Paderborn 07)
11	FW	GER	Benjamin Lauth (to Ferencvárosi TC)
20	MF	GER	Stefan Wannenwetsch (to FC Ingolstadt 04)
25	MF	GER	Andreas Geipl (to Jahn Regensburg)
35	DF	GER	Markus Schwabl (to SpVgg Unterhaching)
36	DF	GER	Phillipp Steinhart (to Bayern Munich II)

=== FC St. Pauli ===
In:

No.	Pos.	Nation	Player
3	DF	GER	Lasse Sobiech (on loan from Hamburger SV)
14	FW	CRO	Ante Budimir (from NK Lokomotiva)
15	DF	GER	Daniel Buballa (from VfR Aalen)
19	MF	KOS	Enis Alushi (from 1. FC Kaiserslautern)
22	MF	GER	Michael Görlitz (from FSV Frankfurt)

Out:

No.	Pos.	Nation	Player
19	FW	AUT	Michael Gregoritsch (loan return to TSG 1899 Hoffenheim)
22	MF	GER	Fin Bartels (to Werder Bremen)
24	DF	GER	Florian Mohr (to SpVgg Greuther Fürth)
25	FW	GER	Kevin Schindler (released)

=== 1. FC Union Berlin ===
In:

No.	Pos.	Nation	Player
9	FW	GER	Sebastian Polter (on loan from 1. FSV Mainz 05)
11	MF	GER	Maximilian Thiel (on loan from 1. FC Köln)
12	GK	MAR	Mohamed Amsif (from FC Augsburg)
18	FW	POL	Martin Kobylański (on loan from Werder Bremen)
28	FW	AUT	Christopher Trimmel (from Rapid Wien)
33	FW	GER	Bajram Nebihi (from FC Augsburg)
37	DF	GER	Toni Leistner (from Dynamo Dresden)

Out:

No.	Pos.	Nation	Player
6	MF	FRA	Marc Pfertzel (to SV Sandhausen)
7	DF	IRL	Patrick Kohlmann (to Holstein Kiel)
11	FW	GER	Simon Terodde (to VfL Bochum)
17	MF	GER	Torsten Mattuschka (to FC Energie Cottbus)

=== FC Ingolstadt 04 ===
In:

No.	Pos.	Nation	Player
5	DF	GER	Benjamin Hübner (from VfR Aalen)
7	FW	AUS	Mathew Leckie (from FSV Frankfurt)
11	FW	CZE	Tomáš Pekhart (from 1. FC Nürnberg)
16	FW	AUT	Lukas Hinterseer (from Wacker Innsbruck)
21	DF	GER	Danny da Costa (from Bayer Leverkusen, previously on loan)
22	MF	GER	Stefan Wannenwetsch (from TSV 1860 München)
23	DF	GER	Robert Bauer (from Karlsruher SC youth)

Out:

No.	Pos.	Nation	Player
7	MF	AUT	Christoph Knasmüllner (to Admira Wacker)
11	FW	GER	Collin Quaner (to VfR Aalen)
23	MF	GER	Reagy Ofosu (to Chemnitzer FC)
28	FW	GER	Philipp Hofmann (loan return to FC Schalke 04)
30	MF	HUN	Tamás Hajnal (released)
31	FW	BRA	Caiuby (to FC Augsburg)

=== VfR Aalen ===
In:

No.	Pos.	Nation	Player
6	DF	GER	Sascha Mockenhaupt (from 1. FC Kaiserslautern II)
8	FW	GER	Collin Quaner (from FC Ingolstadt 04)
17	DF	GHA	Phil Ofosu-Ayeh (from MSV Duisburg)
22	DF	GER	Dennis Chessa (from Bayern Munich II)
24	FW	GER	Dominick Drexler (from SpVgg Greuther Fürth)
25	GK	GER	Oliver Schnitzler (from Bayer 04 Leverkusen II)
26	MF	GER	Arne Feick (from Arminia Bielefeld)
27	FW	GER	Thomas Steinherr (from SpVgg Unterhaching)
30	DF	GER	Sebastian Neumann (from VfL Osnabrück)
31	MF	GER	Maximilian Welzmüller (from SpVgg Unterhaching)
33	MF	GER	Andreas Ludwig (from 1899 Hoffenheim, previously on loan at TSV 1860 München)

Out:

No.	Pos.	Nation	Player
5	DF	GER	Jürgen Mössmer (to 1. FC Nürnberg)
6	DF	GER	Benjamin Hübner (to FC Ingolstadt 04)
8	MF	GER	Selim Aydemir (to Hallescher FC)
11	DF	GER	Enrico Valentini (to Karlsruher SC)
14	FW	FIN	Joel Pohjanpalo (loan return to Bayer 04 Leverkusen)
15	DF	GER	Daniel Buballa (to FC St. Pauli)
17	MF	GER	Sascha Traut (to Karlsruher SC)

=== SV Sandhausen ===
In:

No.	Pos.	Nation	Player
9	FW	MAR	Aziz Bouhaddouz (from Bayer Leverkusen II)
11	MF	GER	Moritz Kuhn (from Sonnenhof Großaspach)
12	FW	USA	Andrew Wooten (from 1. FC Kaiserslautern, previously on loan at FSV Frankfurt)
13	FW	AUT	René Gartler (from SV Ried)
15	MF	GER	Alexander Bieler (from Bayer Leverkusen II)
19	DF	ALB	Leart Paqarada (from Bayer Leverkusen II)
20	MF	GER	Jim-Patrick Müller (from Jahn Regensburg)
23	MF	GER	Kevin Kratz (from Eintracht Braunschweig)
34	MF	FRA	Marc Pfertzel (from 1. FC Union Berlin)

Out:

No.	Pos.	Nation	Player
3	DF	SVK	Radoslav Zabavník (released)
11	DF	GER	Julian Schauerte (to Fortuna Düsseldorf)
16	MF	GER	Nico Klotz (to MSV Duisburg)
18	DF	GER	Matthias Zimmermann (loan return to Borussia Mönchengladbach)
19	GK	AUT	Michael Langer (to Vålerenga IF)
20	MF	NGR	Eke Uzoma (to Pécsi MFC)
23	MF	GER	Markus Mendler (loan return to 1. FC Nürnberg)
25	MF	GER	Danny Blum (to 1. FC Nürnberg)

=== FSV Frankfurt ===
In:

No.	Pos.	Nation	Player
2	MF	GER	Hanno Balitsch (free agent)
4	DF	NED	Tom Beugelsdijk (from ADO Den Haag)
8	MF	GER	Mario Engels (from 1. FC Köln II)
10	FW	MLT	André Schembri (from AC Omonia)
13	FW	ALG	Mohamed Amine Aoudia (from Dynamo Dresden)
14	DF	GER	Alexander Bittroff (from Energie Cottbus)
18	MF	GER	Fabian Burdenski (from Wisła Kraków)
29	FW	SLO	Zlatko Dedič (free agent)
31	DF	TUN	Sofian Chahed (free agent)
32	MF	ITA	Vincenzo Grifo (on loan from 1899 Hoffenheim, previously on loan at Dynamo Dresden)

Out:

No.	Pos.	Nation	Player
4	DF	GER	Nils Teixeira (to Dynamo Dresden)
8	MF	GER	Michael Görlitz (to FC St. Pauli)
10	FW	AUS	Nikita Rukavytsya (loan return to 1. FSV Mainz 05)
16	MF	GER	Marc Heitmeier (to Preußen Münster)
18	MF	GER	Marcel Kandziora (to VfL Osnabrück)
19	FW	USA	Andrew Wooten (loan return to 1. FC Kaiserslautern)
20	FW	AUS	Mathew Leckie (to FC Ingolstadt 04)
25	MF	TUR	Emre Nefiz (to Gaziantepspor)
31	DF	GER	Tim Heubach (to 1. FC Kaiserslautern)
--	FW	GER	Markus Ziereis (on loan to Chemnitzer FC, previously on loan at SV Darmstadt 98)

=== FC Erzgebirge Aue ===
In:

No.	Pos.	Nation	Player
7	FW	NED	Romario Kortzorg (from Botev Plovdiv)
19	FW	EST	Hannes Anier (free agent)
21	FW	GER	Patrick Schönfeld (from Arminia Bielefeld)
24	FW	EST	Henri Anier (from Motherwell F.C.)
27	DF	GER	Thorsten Schulz (from Dynamo Dresden)
29	DF	CRO	Stipe Vučur (from Wacker Innsbruck)

Out:

No.	Pos.	Nation	Player
7	MF	GER	Bastian Hohmann (released)
12	FW	SVK	Jakub Sylvestr (to 1. FC Nürnberg)
13	FW	GER	Ronny König (to SV Darmstadt 98)
14	MF	BIH	Zlatko Janjić (to MSV Duisburg)
21	DF	GER	Dominic Rau (to Hallescher FC)
25	FW	TUR	Guido Koçer (to Gençlerbirliği S.K.)
32	DF	ESP	Iván González (released)
--	FW	GER	Andreas Wiegel (to Rot-Weiß Erfurt, previously on loan)

=== VfL Bochum ===
In:

No.	Pos.	Nation	Player
4	DF	GER	Malcolm Cacutalua (on loan from Bayer Leverkusen, previously on loan at SpVgg Greuther Fürth)
6	DF	CZE	Jan Šimůnek (from 1. FC Kaiserslautern)
7	FW	GER	Marco Terrazzino (from SC Freiburg)
8	MF	FRA	Anthony Losilla (from Dynamo Dresden)
9	FW	SVK	Stanislav Šesták (from Bursaspor)
11	FW	AUT	Michael Gregoritsch (on loan from TSG 1899 Hoffenheim)
17	MF	GER	Tobias Weis (on loan from TSG 1899 Hoffenheim, previously on loan at Eintracht Frankfurt)
21	DF	GER	Stefano Celozzi (from Eintracht Frankfurt)
22	FW	GER	Simon Terodde (from 1. FC Union Berlin)
24	DF	GER	Timo Perthel (from Eintracht Braunschweig)
29	MF	GER	Julian Stock (from VfL Bochum U-19)
33	FW	FIN	Mikael Forssell (from HJK)
38	GK	GER	Marius Weeke (from VfL Bochum U-19)
39	MF	NOR	Henrik Gulden (from VfL Bochum U-19)
--	DF	GER	Lukas Klostermann (from VfL Bochum U-19)

Out:

No.	Pos.	Nation	Player
4	DF	GER	Marcel Maltritz (retired)
6	DF	GER	Lukas Sinkiewicz (released)
7	MF	GER	Paul Freier (retired)
8	MF	GER	Christian Tiffert (released)
9	FW	GER	Richard Sukuta-Pasu (loan return to 1. FC Kaiserslautern)
11	DF	GER	Felix Bastians (loan return to Hertha BSC)
15	DF	ISL	Hólmar Örn Eyjólfsson (released)
22	FW	GER	Mirkan Aydın (to Eskişehirspor)
23	MF	GER	Florian Jungwirth (to SV Darmstadt 98)
24	DF	GER	Carsten Rothenbach (released)
26	DF	GER	Jonas Acquistapace (to AC Omonia)
28	FW	GER	Sven Kreyer (to Rot-Weiss Essen)
34	GK	GER	Jonas Ermes (released)
35	GK	GER	Sebastian Brune (to SV Waldhof Mannheim)
37	DF	GER	Lukas Klostermann (to RB Leipzig)
--	MF	GER	Sören Bertram (to Hallescher FC, previously on loan)
--	FW	FRA	Smail Morabit (to 1. FC Heidenheim, previously on loan)

=== 1. FC Heidenheim ===
In:

No.	Pos.	Nation	Player
1	GK	GER	Jan Zimmermann (from SV Darmstadt 98)
9	FW	FRA	Smail Morabit (from VfL Bochum, previously on loan)
13	MF	GER	Robert Leipertz (from FC Schalke 04 II)
19	MF	GER	Philipp Riese (from Arminia Bielefeld)
22	MF	GER	Manuel Janzer (from VfB Stuttgart II)
23	DF	GER	Kevin Kraus (from SpVgg Greuther Fürth)
27	DF	GER	Michael Vitzthum (from VfB Stuttgart, previously on loan at Karlsruher SC)
39	FW	GER	Adriano Grimaldi (from VfL Osnabrück)

Out:

No.	Pos.	Nation	Player
10	MF	GER	Sven Sökler (to 1. FC Saarbrücken)
22	DF	GER	Marc Endres (to Chemnitzer FC)
27	FW	GER	Michael Thurk (released)

=== RB Leipzig ===
In:

No.	Pos.	Nation	Player
6	MF	GER	Rani Khedira (from VfB Stuttgart)
10	FW	CRO	Ante Rebić (on loan from ACF Fiorentina)
18	FW	USA	Terrence Boyd (from Rapid Wien)
19	MF	HUN	Zsolt Kalmár (from Győri ETO FC)
33	DF	GER	Marvin Compper (from ACF Fiorentina)
37	DF	GER	Lukas Klostermann (from VfL Bochum)
--	FW	BIH	Smail Prevljak (from RB Leipzig U19)
--	MF	BEL	Massimo Bruno (from R.S.C. Anderlecht)
--	MF	AUT	Marcel Sabitzer (from Rapid Wien)

Out:

No.	Pos.	Nation	Player
4	DF	GER	Tobias Willers (to VfL Osnabrück)
14	FW	BIH	Smail Prevljak (on loan to Red Bull Salzburg)
18	FW	GER	Timo Röttger (to Viktoria Köln)
20	FW	GER	Denis Thomalla (on loan to SV Ried)
26	GK	GER	Erik Domaschke (released)
33	MF	GER	André Luge (on loan to SV Elversberg)
--	MF	AUT	Marcel Sabitzer (on loan to Red Bull Salzburg)
--	MF	BRA	Thiago Rockenbach (released, previously on loan at Hertha BSC II)
--	MF	BEL	Massimo Bruno (on loan to Red Bull Salzburg)

=== SV Darmstadt 98 ===
In:

No.	Pos.	Nation	Player
1	GK	GER	Patrick Platins (from Arminia Bielefeld)
10	FW	GER	Maurice Exslager (on loan from 1. FC Köln)
11	MF	GER	Tobias Kempe (from Dynamo Dresden)
13	FW	GER	Ronny König (from FC Erzgebirge Aue)
18	DF	FRA	Romain Brégerie (from Dynamo Dresden)
23	MF	GER	Florian Jungwirth (from VfL Bochum)
32	MF	GER	Fabian Holland (on loan from Hertha BSC)
33	GK	GER	Marius Sauss (from VfL Wolfsburg II)
--	GK	GER	Christian Wetklo (from 1. FSV Mainz 05)

Out:

No.	Pos.	Nation	Player
1	GK	GER	Christian Wetklo (to FC Schalke 04)
1	GK	GER	Jan Zimmermann (to 1. FC Heidenheim)
11	MF	GER	Markus Ziereis (loan return to FSV Frankfurt)
19	MF	CRO	Josip Landeka (to SG Sonnenhof Großaspach)

== See also ==
- 2014–15 Bundesliga
- 2014–15 2. Bundesliga
