= 2013–14 TSG 1899 Hoffenheim season =

TSG 1899 Hoffenheim
2013–14 season
- Manager: Markus Gisdol
- Stadium: Rhein-Neckar-Arena
- Bundesliga: 9th
- DFB-Pokal: Quarter-finals
- Top goalscorer: Roberto Firmino (16)
Home colours	Away colours	Third colours

During the 2013–14 German football season, TSG 1899 Hoffenheim competed in the Bundesliga.

== Season summary ==
After the previous season's near brush with relegation, Hoffenheim was resurgent and finished in ninth, exactly 17 points from both relegation and Champions League qualification. They were also one of the division's top-scoring team, with the top two of Bayern Munich and Borussia Dortmund scoring more than Hoffenheim's 72. However, this coincided with the league's second-worst defense, with 70 goals being conceded.

== First-team squad ==
Squad at end of season

Note: Flags indicate national team as defined under FIFA eligibility rules; some limited exceptions apply. Players may hold more than one non-FIFA nationality.

No.	Pos.	Nation	Player
2	DF	GER	Andreas Beck
4	DF	GER	Stefan Thesker
6	MF	GER	Sebastian Rudy
7	MF	GER	Boris Vukčević (Note: Vukčević was born in Osijek, Yugoslavia (now Croatia), but also qualifies to represent Germany internationally and has represented them at U-19, U-20 and U-21 level.)
8	MF	POL	Eugen Polanski (Note: Polanski was born in Sosnowiec, Poland, but also qualifies to represent Germany internationally and represented them at U-21 level before making his international debut for Poland in August 2011.)
9	FW	GER	Sven Schipplock
10	MF	BRA	Roberto Firmino
11	FW	SWE	Jiloan Hamad (Note: Hamad was born in Baku, Soviet Union (now Azerbaijan), but was raised in Sweden from the age of 2 and represented them at U-17, U-19, and U-21 level before making his international debut for Sweden in January 2011.)
12	DF	GER	Tobias Strobl
13	GK	GER	Jens Grahl
14	FW	NOR	Tarik Elyounoussi (Note: Elyounoussi was born in Al Hoceima, Morocco, but was raised in Norway from the age of 11 and represented them at U-21 level before making his international debut for Norway in May 2008.)
16	DF	USA	Fabian Johnson (Note: Johnson was born in Munich, West Germany (now Germany), and represented them at every youth level between U-17 and U-21, but also qualifies to represent the United States internationally through his father and made his international debut for the United States in November 2011.)
19	DF	ARG	David Abraham
20	MF	TUN	Ahmed Sassi
21	DF	GER	Kevin Akpoguma

No.	Pos.	Nation	Player
22	MF	BRA	Bruno Nazário
23	MF	BIH	Sejad Salihović
24	DF	GER	Patrick Schorr
25	DF	GER	Niklas Süle
26	GK	GER	Tim Paterok
27	FW	FRA	Anthony Modeste
28	GK	GER	Alexander Stolz
29	DF	DEN	Jannik Vestergaard
30	GK	BEL	Koen Casteels
31	FW	GER	Kevin Volland
33	DF	GER	Robin Szarka
34	FW	TUR	Kenan Karaman (Note: Karaman was born in Stuttgart, Germany, but also qualifies to represent Turkey internationally and represented them at every age level between U-18 and U-21 before making his international debut for Turkey in November 2017.)
36	DF	GER	Jeremy Toljan
38	FW	GER	Kai Herdling
40	FW	USA	Joe Gyau

=== Left club during season ===
Note: Flags indicate national team as defined under FIFA eligibility rules; some limited exceptions apply. Players may hold more than one non-FIFA nationality.

No.	Pos.	Nation	Player
1	GK	GER	Tim Wiese (released)
3	DF	GER	Matthias Jaissle
11	FW	SUI	Eren Derdiyok (on loan to Bayer Leverkusen)
13	DF	FRA	Matthieu Delpierre (to Utrecht)

No.	Pos.	Nation	Player
17	MF	GER	Tobias Weis (on loan to Eintracht Frankfurt)
32	MF	ITA	Vincenzo Grifo (Note: Grifo was born in Pforzheim, Germany, but also qualifies to represent Italy internationally through his parents and has represented them at U-20 level.) (on loan to Dynamo Dresden)
39	MF	GER	Andreas Ludwig (on loan to 1860 Munich)

== Competitions ==
=== Bundesliga ===
==== League table ====
Pos	Team	Pld	W	D	L	GF	GA	GD	Pts	Qualification or relegation
7	Mainz 05	34	16	5	13	52	54	−2	53	Qualification for the Europa League third qualifying round (Note: The 2013–14 DFB-Pokal finalists (Borussia Dortmund and Bayern Munich) qualified for the UEFA Champions League, thus the three Europa League places were distributed through league positions.)
8	FC Augsburg	34	15	7	12	47	47	0	52	
9	1899 Hoffenheim	34	11	11	12	72	70	+2	44	
10	Hannover 96	34	12	6	16	46	59	−13	42	
11	Hertha BSC	34	11	8	15	40	48	−8	41	

Source: DFB
Rules for classification: 1) points; 2) goal difference; 3) number of goals scored.

==== Results summary ====
Overall								Home						Away					
Pld	W	D	L	GF	GA	GD	Pts	W	D	L	GF	GA	GD	W	D	L	GF	GA	GD
34	11	11	12	72	70	+2	44	7	6	4	43	31	+12	4	5	8	29	39	−10

Last updated: 24 April 2020.

==== Matches ====
10 August 2013 1	Hoffenheim	2–2	1. FC Nürnberg	Sinsheim
15:30 CEST	Abraham 34'; Modeste 51'	Report	Frantz 54'; Ginczek 57'	Stadium: Rhein-Neckar Arena; Attendance: 25,730; Referee: Thorsten Kinhöfer

17 August 2013 2	Hamburger SV	1–5	Hoffenheim	Hamburg
15:30 CEST	Van der Vaart 44' (pen.)	Report	Firmino 5', 78'; Volland 51'; Modeste 67', 75'	Stadium: Volksparkstadion; Attendance: 47,483; Referee: Günter Perl

24 August 2013 3	Hoffenheim	3–3	SC Freiburg	Sinsheim
15:30 CEST	Salihović 10' (pen.); Volland 25'; Strobl 77'	Report	Sorg 13'; Guédé 29'; Freis 65'	Stadium: Rhein-Neckar Arena; Attendance: 24,118; Referee: Tobias Stieler

1 September 2013 4	VfB Stuttgart	6–2	Hoffenheim	Stuttgart
15:30 CEST	Rüdiger 12'; Ibišević 19', 47', 63'; Maxim 28', 55'	Report	Volland 26'; Firmino 87'	Stadium: Mercedes-Benz Arena; Attendance: 42,450; Referee: Jochen Drees

15 September 2013 5	Hoffenheim	2–1	Borussia Mönchengladbach	Sinsheim
15:30 CEST	Modeste 45'; Volland 54'	Report	Hrgota 75'	Stadium: Rhein-Neckar Arena; Attendance: 29,447; Referee: Christian Dingert

21 September 2013 6	VfL Wolfsburg	2–1	Hoffenheim	Wolfsburg

28 September 2013 7	TSG 1899 Hoffenheim	3–3	FC Schalke 04	Sinsheim

5 October 2013 8	1. FSV Mainz 05	2–2	Hoffenheim	Mainz

18 October 2013 9	Hoffenheim	1–2	Bayer 04 Leverkusen	Sinsheim

26 October 2013 10	Hannover 96	1–4	Hoffenheim	Hannover

2 November 2013 11	Hoffenheim	1–2	FC Bayern München	Sinsheim

9 November 2013 12	Hoffenheim	2–3	Hertha BSC	Sinsheim

23 November 2013 13	FC Augsburg	2–0	Hoffenheim	Augsburg

30 November 2013 14	Hoffenheim	4–4	SV Werder Bremen	Sinsheim

7 December 2013 15	SG Eintracht Frankfurt	1–2	TSG 1899 Hoffenheim	Frankfurt

14 December 2013 16	TSG 1899 Hoffenheim	2–2	BV Borussia Dortmund	Sinsheim

21 December 2013 17	Eintracht Braunschweig	1–0	Hoffenheim	Braunschweig

25 January 2014 18	1. FC Nürnberg	4–0	Hoffenheim	Nürnberg

1 February 2014 19	Hoffenheim	3–0	Hamburger SV	Sinsheim

8 February 2014 20	SC Freiburg	1–1	Hoffenheim	Freiburg

15 February 2014 21	Hoffenheim	4–1	VfB Stuttgart	Sinsheim

22 February 2014 22	VfL Borussia Mönchengladbach	2–2	Hoffenheim	Mönchengladbach

2 March 2014 23	Hoffenheim	6–2	VfL Wolfsburg	Sinsheim

8 March 2014 24	FC Schalke 04	4–0	Hoffenheim	Gelsenkirchen

15 March 2014 25	Hoffenheim	2–4	1. FSV Mainz 05	Sinsheim

23 March 2014 26	Bayer 04 Leverkusen	2–3	Hoffenheim	Leverkusen

26 March 2014 27	Hoffenheim	3–1	Hannover 96	Sinsheim

29 March 2014 28	FC Bayern München	3–3	Hoffenheim	Munich

6 April 2014 29	Hertha BSC	1–1	Hoffenheim	Berlin

13 April 2014 30	Hoffenheim	2–0	FC Augsburg	Sinsheim

19 April 2014 31	SV Werder Bremen	3–1	Hoffenheim	Bremen

26 April 2014 32	Hoffenheim	0–0	SG Eintracht Frankfurt	Sinsheim

3 May 2014 33	BV Borussia Dortmund	3–2	Hoffenheim	Dortmund

10 May 2014 34	Hoffenheim	3–1	Eintracht Braunschweig	Sinsheim

=== DFB-Pokal ===
3 August 2013 First round	SG Aumund-Vegesack	0–9	1899 Hoffenheim	Bremen
15:30 CEST		Report	Firmino 52', 66'; Modeste 56', 58'; Abraham 70'; Schipplock 80', 81'; Herdling 85', 86'	Stadium: Weserstadion Platz 11; Attendance: 4,500; Referee: Martin Thomsen

24 September 2013 Second round	1899 Hoffenheim	3–0 (a.e.t.)	Energie Cottbus	Sinsheim
20:30 CEST	Süle 95'; Firmino 103'; Schipplock 117'	Report		Stadium: Rhein-Neckar-Arena; Attendance: 12,000; Referee: Peter Sippel

3 December 2013 Round of 16	Schalke 04	1–3	1899 Hoffenheim	Gelsenkirchen
20:30 CET	Farfán 67'	Report	Herdling 21'; Volland 32'; Firmino 35'	Stadium: Veltins-Arena; Attendance: 51,078; Referee: Knut Kircher

12 February 2014 Quarter-final	1899 Hoffenheim	2–3	VfL Wolfsburg	Sinsheim
19:00 CET	Firmino 39', 90+1'	Report	Rodríguez 26' (pen.), 44' (pen.); Dost 64'	Stadium: Rhein-Neckar-Arena; Attendance: 13,347; Referee: Peter Gagelmann

== Statistics ==
=== Appearances and goals ===
No.	Pos	Nat	Player	Total		Bundesliga		DFB-Pokal	
No.	Pos	Nat	Player	Apps	Goals	Apps	Goals	Apps	Goals
Goalkeepers
13	GK	(Germany) GER	Jens Grahl	13	0	11	0	2	0
26	GK	(Germany) GER	Tim Paterok	0	0	0	0	0	0
28	GK	(Germany) GER	Alexander Stolz	1	0	1	0	0	0
30	GK	(Belgium) BEL	Koen Casteels	25	0	23	0	2	0
Defenders
2	DF	(Germany) GER	Andreas Beck	37	1	33	1	4	0
4	DF	(Germany) GER	Stefan Thesker	3	0	2	0	1	0
19	DF	(Argentina) ARG	David Abraham	21	3	20	2	1	1
21	DF	(Nigeria) NGR	Kevin Akpoguma	0	0	0	0	0	0
24	DF	(Germany) GER	Patrick Schorr	0	0	0	0	0	0
25	DF	(Germany) GER	Niklas Süle	28	5	25	4	3	1
29	DF	(Denmark) DEN	Jannik Vestergaard	29	1	25	1	4	0
36	DF	(Germany) GER	Jeremy Toljan	11	0	10	0	1	0
40	DF	(United States) USA	Joseph-Claude Gyau	2	0	2	0	0	0
Midfielders
6	MF	(Germany) GER	Sebastian Rudy	30	2	27	2	3	0
8	MF	(Poland) POL	Eugen Polanski	36	3	32	3	4	0
11	MF	(Iraq) IRQ	Jiloan Hamad	8	0	7	0	1	0
12	MF	(Germany) GER	Tobias Strobl	33	1	29	1	4	0
20	MF	(Tunisia) TUN	Ahmed Sassi	0	0	0	0	0	0
22	MF	(Brazil) BRA	Bruno Nazário	2	0	2	0	0	0
23	MF	(Bosnia and Herzegovina) BIH	Sejad Salihović	30	11	28	11	2	0
33	MF	(Germany) GER	Robin Szarka	2	0	2	0	0	0
Forwards
7	FW	(Germany) GER	Boris Vukčević	0	0	0	0	0	0
9	FW	(Germany) GER	Sven Schipplock	27	9	23	6	4	3
10	FW	(Brazil) BRA	Roberto Firmino	37	22	33	16	4	6
14	FW	(Norway) NOR	Tarik Elyounoussi	25	0	21	0	4	0
16	FW	(United States) USA	Fabian Johnson	28	0	27	0	1	0
27	FW	(France) FRA	Anthony Modeste	33	14	29	12	4	2
31	FW	(Germany) GER	Kevin Volland	37	12	33	11	4	1
34	FW	(Turkey) TUR	Kenan Karaman	5	0	5	0	0	0
38	FW	(Germany) GER	Kai Herdling	26	5	23	2	3	3
Players transferred out during the season
1	GK	(Germany) GER	Tim Wiese	0	0	0	0	0	0
3	GK	(Germany) GER	Matthias Jaissle	0	0	0	0	0	0
11	FW	(Switzerland) SUI	Eren Derdiyok	0	0	0	0	0	0
13	FW	(France) FRA	Matthieu Delpierre	0	0	0	0	0	0
17	MF	(Germany) GER	Tobias Weis	0	0	0	0	0	0
32	FW	(Italy) ITA	Vincenzo Grifo	0	0	0	0	0	0
39	FW	(Germany) GER	Andreas Ludwig	0	0	0	0	0	0

Last updated: 27 November 2021
Source: DFB
