= 2014–15 TSG 1899 Hoffenheim season =

TSG 1899 Hoffenheim
2014–15 season
- Chairman: Jochen A. Rotthaus
- Manager: Markus Gisdol
- Stadium: Rhein-Neckar Arena, Sinsheim, Baden-Württemberg
- Bundesliga: 8th
- DFB-Pokal: Quarter-finals
- Top goalscorer: League: Kevin Volland (7 goals); All: Roberto Firmino; Sven Schipplock; Kevin Volland (9 each)
Home colours	Away colours	Third colours

The 2014–15 TSG 1899 Hoffenheim season was the 116th season in the club's football history. The club played in the Bundesliga, the top tier of German football. It was the club's seventh consecutive season in this league, having been promoted from the 2. Bundesliga in 2008.

== First team squad ==
Squad at end of season

Note: Flags indicate national team as defined under FIFA eligibility rules; some limited exceptions apply. Players may hold more than one non-FIFA nationality.

No.	Pos.	Nation	Player
1	GK	GER	Oliver Baumann
2	DF	GER	Andreas Beck (captain)
4	DF	BIH	Ermin Bičakčić
6	MF	GER	Sebastian Rudy
8	MF	POL	Eugen Polanski
9	FW	GER	Sven Schipplock
10	MF	BRA	Roberto Firmino
12	MF	GER	Tobias Strobl
13	GK	GER	Jens Grahl
14	MF	NOR	Tarik Elyounoussi
15	DF	GER	Jeremy Toljan
16	MF	SUI	Pirmin Schwegler
17	MF	SUI	Steven Zuber
19	DF	ARG	David Abraham

No.	Pos.	Nation	Player
20	DF	KOR	Kim Jin-su
21	DF	GER	Kevin Akpoguma
22	DF	GER	Nicolai Rapp
23	MF	BIH	Sejad Salihović
25	DF	GER	Niklas Süle
26	FW	GER	Janik Haberer
27	FW	FRA	Anthony Modeste
28	FW	HUN	Ádám Szalai
31	FW	GER	Kevin Volland
33	GK	GER	Alexander Stolz
34	DF	GER	Nadiem Amiri
35	GK	GER	Marvin Schwäbe
38	MF	GER	Kai Herdling

=== Players out on loan ===
Note: Flags indicate national team as defined under FIFA eligibility rules; some limited exceptions apply. Players may hold more than one non-FIFA nationality.

No.	Pos.	Nation	Player
—	MF	GHA	Afriyie Acquah (at Sampdoria)
—	MF	PER	Luis Advíncula (at Sporting Cristal)
—	MF	BRA	Guilherme Biteco (at Santa Cruz Futebol Clube)
—	FW	AUT	Michael Gregoritsch (at VfL Bochum)
—	MF	ITA	Vincenzo Grifo (at FSV Frankfurt)
—	MF	SRB	Filip Malbašić (at Lechia Gdańsk)
—	MF	BRA	Bruno Nazário (at Lechia Gdańsk)
—	MF	PER	Junior Ponce (at Vitória de Setúbal)
—	MF	GER	Tobias Weis (at VfL Bochum)
—	MF	LIE	Sandro Wieser (at FC Aarau)
—	MF	FIN	Juho Martikainen (at Hertha BSC)

== Transfers ==
=== Summer ===
==== In ====
Note: Flags indicate national team as defined under FIFA eligibility rules; some limited exceptions apply. Players may hold more than one non-FIFA nationality.

No.	Pos.	Nation	Player
1	GK	GER	Oliver Baumann (from Basel)
4	DF	BIH	Ermin Bičakčić (at Eintracht Braunschweig)
16	MF	SUI	Pirmin Schwegler (at Eintracht Frankfurt)
17	MF	SUI	Steven Zuber (from CSKA Moscow)
20	DF	KOR	Kim Jin-su (from Albirex)
26	FW	GER	Janik Haberer (from SpVgg Unterhaching)
28	FW	HUN	Ádám Szalai (from Schalke 04)

==== Out ====
Note: Flags indicate national team as defined under FIFA eligibility rules; some limited exceptions apply. Players may hold more than one non-FIFA nationality.

No.	Pos.	Nation	Player
—	DF	NED	Edson Braafheid (at Lazio)
—	DF	GER	Stefan Thesker (at Hannover 96)
—	DF	USA	Fabian Johnson (at Borussia Mönchengladbach)
—	DF	GER	Robin Szarka (at Energie Cottbus)
—	MF	GER	Andreas Ludwig (at VfR Aalen)
—	MF	USA	Joseph-Claude Gyau (at Borussia Dortmund II)
—	FW	ESP	Joselu (at Hannover 96)
—	FW	SUI	Eren Derdiyok (at Kasımpaşa)
—	FW	TUR	Kenan Karaman (at Hannover 96)

=== Winter ===
==== In ====
Note: Flags indicate national team as defined under FIFA eligibility rules; some limited exceptions apply. Players may hold more than one non-FIFA nationality.

No.	Pos.	Nation	Player
—	MF	GHA	Afriyie Acquah (loan ended at Parma)
—	MF	BRA	Guilherme Biteco (loan ended at Vasco de Gama)

==== Out ====
Note: Flags indicate national team as defined under FIFA eligibility rules; some limited exceptions apply. Players may hold more than one non-FIFA nationality.

No.	Pos.	Nation	Player
11	MF	SWE	Jiloan Hamad (transferred to Standard Liege)
29	DF	DEN	Jannik Vestergaard (transferred to Werder Bremen)
30	GK	BEL	Koen Casteels (transferred to VfL Wolfsburg)
41	FW	ZIM	Knowledge Musona (transferred to KV Oostende)
—	MF	GHA	Afriyie Acquah (loaned to Sampdoria)
—	MF	BRA	Guilherme Biteco (loaned to Santa Cruz Futebol Clube)

== Competitions ==
=== Bundesliga ===
==== League table ====
Pos	Team	Pld	W	D	L	GF	GA	GD	Pts	Qualification or relegation
6	Schalke 04	34	13	9	12	42	40	+2	48	Qualification for the Europa League group stage (Note: Since the winners of the 2014–15 DFB-Pokal, VfL Wolfsburg, qualified for the Champions League based on league position, the Europa League group stage spot was passed to the sixth-placed team, Schalke 04; and the Europa League third qualifying round spot was passed to the seventh-placed team, Borussia Dortmund.)
7	Borussia Dortmund	34	13	7	14	47	42	+5	46	Qualification for the Europa League third qualifying round
8	1899 Hoffenheim	34	12	8	14	49	55	−6	44	
9	Eintracht Frankfurt	34	11	10	13	56	62	−6	43	
10	Werder Bremen	34	11	10	13	50	65	−15	43	

Source: DFB
Rules for classification: 1) points; 2) goal difference; 3) number of goals scored

==== Results summary ====
Overall								Home						Away					
Pld	W	D	L	GF	GA	GD	Pts	W	D	L	GF	GA	GD	W	D	L	GF	GA	GD
32	11	8	13	47	52	−5	41	8	3	5	29	25	+4	3	5	8	18	27	−9

Last updated: 9 May 2015.
Source: Competitive matches

==== Results by round ====
Round	1	2	3	4	5	6	7	8	9	10	11	12	13	14	15	16	17	18	19	20	21	22	23	24	25	26	27	28	29	30	31	32	33	34
Ground	H	A	H	A	H	A	H	A	H	A	H	A	H	A	H	H	A	A	H	A	H	A	H	A	H	A	H	A	H	A	H	A	A	H
Result	W	D	D	W	D	D	W	D	W	L	L	L	W	L	W	L	W	L	L	L	W	D	W	L	W	D	L	L	L	W	D	L	L	W
Position	1	3	8	3	4	4	2	3	4	4	5	8	7	8	7	7	7	7	7	7	7	7	7	7	7	7	7	7	8	7	8	9	9	8

Updated to match(es) played on 1 March 2015. Source: Competitive matches
A = Away; H = Home; W = Win; D = Draw; L = Loss

==== Matches ====
23 August 2014 1	1899 Hoffenheim	2–0	FC Augsburg	Sinsheim
15:30 CEST (UTC+02:00)	Volland (yellow card) 15'; Szalai 33'; Elyounoussi 35'; Polanski (yellow card) 77'	Report	Callsen-Bracker (yellow card) 18'; Baier (yellow card) 47'; Werner (yellow card) 53'	Stadium: Rhein-Neckar Arena; Attendance: 23,792; Referee: Tobias Stieler

30 August 2014 2	Werder Bremen	1–1	1899 Hoffenheim	Bremen
15:30 CEST (UTC+02:00)	Selke (yellow card) 3'; Junuzović (yellow card) 36'; Gálvez 59', (yellow card) 60'	Report	Roberto Firmino 19'	Stadium: Weserstadion; Attendance: 38,900; Referee: Robert Hartmann

13 September 2014 3	1899 Hoffenheim	1–1	VfL Wolfsburg	Sinsheim
15:30 CEST (UTC+02:00)	Modeste 55'; Polanski (yellow card) 72'	Report	Guilavogui (yellow card) 84' (yellow-red card) 90'; Olić 89'	Stadium: Rhein-Neckar-Arena; Attendance: 23,813; Referee: Wolfgang Stark

20 August 2014 4	VfB Stuttgart	0–2	1899 Hoffenheim	Stuttgart
15:30 CEST (UTC+02:00)		Report	Modeste 15'; Rudy (yellow card) 70'; Elyounoussi 84'; Schipplock (yellow card) 89'	Stadium: Mercedes-Benz Arena; Attendance: 44,000; Referee: Peter Sippel

23 September 2014 5	1899 Hoffenheim	3–3	SC Freiburg	Sinsheim
20:00 CEST (UTC+02:00)	Elyounoussi 40'; Beck (yellow card) 56'; Rudy 64', (yellow card) 90'; Strobl (yellow card) 75'; Vestergaard 90+3'	Report	Frantz 32', 33'; Klaus (yellow card) 54'; Mujdža (yellow card) 56'; Schuster (yellow card) 60'; Darida 75' (pen.), (red card) 81'	Stadium: Rhein-Neckar-Arena; Attendance: 20,000; Referee: Thorsten Kinhöfer

26 September 2014 6	FSV Mainz 05	0–0	1899 Hoffenheim	Mainz
20:30 CEST (UTC+02:00)	Allagui (yellow card) 20'	Report	Polanski (yellow card) 56'; Rudy (yellow card) 71'	Stadium: Coface Arena; Attendance: 28,000; Referee: Felix Zwayer

4 October 2014 7	1899 Hoffenheim	2–1	Schalke 04	Sinsheim
15:30 CEST (UTC+02:00)	Elyounoussi 13', (yellow card) 43'; Szalai 29' (yellow card) 33'; Schipplock (yellow card) 88'	Report	Huntelaar (yellow card) 56', (goal) 83'; Aogo (yellow card) 69'; Matip (yellow card) 70' (yellow-red card) 75'; Fuchs (yellow card) 72'	Stadium: Rhein-Neckar-Arena; Attendance: 30,000; Referee: Florian Meyer

19 October 2014 8	Hamburger SV	1–1	1899 Hoffenheim	Hamburg
15:30 CEST (UTC+02:00)	Lasogga 34'; Arslan (yellow card) 37'	Report	Modeste 15', (yellow card) 49'; Volland (yellow card) 45'; Rudy (yellow card) 77'	Stadium: Volksparkstadion; Attendance: 49,003; Referee: Peter Sippel

25 October 2014 9	1899 Hoffenheim	1–0	SC Paderborn	Sinsheim
15:30 CEST (UTC+02:00)	Volland 73', (yellow card) 89'; Schipplock (yellow card) 86'	Report	Heinloth (yellow card) 80'; Ouali (yellow card) 82'; Kachunga (yellow card) 87'	Stadium: Rhein-Neckar Arena; Attendance: 25,712; Referee: Robert Hartmann

2 November 2014 10	Borussia Mönchengladbach	3–1	1899 Hoffenheim	Mönchengladbach
15:30 CET (UTC+01:00)	Hahn 12'; Herrmann 32', 52', (yellow card) 43'	Report	Strobl (yellow card) 9'; Modeste 30'	Stadium: Borussia-Park; Attendance: 52,409; Referee: Deniz Aytekin

8 November 2014 11	1899 Hoffenheim	3–4	1. FC Köln	Sinsheim
15:30 CET (UTC+01:00)	Szalai 2'; Roberto Firmino 39', 45'; Beck (yellow card) 62'	Report	Olkowski 5', 83'; Lehmann 12'; Ujah 35', (yellow card) 57'; Vogt (yellow card) 74'	Stadium: Rhein-Neckar Arena; Attendance: 30,150; Referee: Günter Perl

22 November 2014 12	Bayern Munich	4–0	1899 Hoffenheim	Munich
15:30 CET (UTC+01:00)	Götze 27'; Boateng (yellow card) 30'; Lewandowski 39'; Robben 82'; Rode 87'; Alonso (yellow card) 88'	Report	Schwegler (yellow card) 28'; Volland (yellow card) 54'; Szalai (red card) 90'	Stadium: Allianz Arena; Attendance: 71,000; Referee: Peter Gagelmann

29 November 2014 13	1899 Hoffenheim	4–3	Hannover 96	Sinsheim
18:30 CET (UTC+01:00)	Schwegler 19'; Volland 37'; Polanski 59'; Süle 63'; Bičakčić (yellow card) 75'	Report	Sakai (yellow card) 19'; Schulz (yellow card) 39'; Stindl 43', 86' (yellow card) 84'; Joselu 52', (yellow card) 90+2'	Stadium: Rhein-Neckar Arena; Attendance: 22,716; Referee: Felix Brych

5 December 2014 14	Borussia Dortmund	1–0	1899 Hoffenheim	Dortmund
20:30 CET (UTC+01:00)	Gündoğan 17'; Kehl (yellow card) 23'	Report	Süle (yellow card) 26'; Schwegler (yellow card) 63'; Salihović (yellow card) 85'; Polanski (yellow card) 88'	Stadium: Westfalenstadion; Attendance: 80,000; Referee: Felix Zwayer

12 December 2014 15	1899 Hoffenheim	3–2	Eintracht Frankfurt	Sinsheim
20:30 CET (UTC+01:00)	Kim (yellow card) 35'; Volland 43'; Beck (yellow card) 58'; Szalai 65'; Roberto Firmino 87', (yellow card) 88'	Report	Anderson Bamba (yellow card) 32'; Aigner 58'; Hasebe (yellow card) 73'; Seferovic 77'	Stadium: Rhein-Neckar Arena; Attendance: 28,331; Referee: Jochen Drees

17 December 2014 16	1899 Hoffenheim	0–1	Bayer Leverkusen	Sinsheim
20:00 CET (UTC+01:00)	Strobl (yellow card) 4'	Report	Bender (yellow card) 44'; Boenisch (yellow card) 37'; Kießling 79'; Hilbert (yellow card) 89'	Stadium: Rhein-Neckar Arena; Attendance: 24,731; Referee: Daniel Siebert

21 December 2014 17	Hertha BSC	0–5	1899 Hoffenheim	Berlin
15:30 CET (UTC+01:00)	Hosogai (yellow card) 45'; Stocker (yellow card) 78'; Ben-Hatira (yellow card) 90'	Report	Brooks 23' (o.g.); Salihović 26' (pen.), 39' (pen.); Roberto Firmino (yellow card) 42'; Schipplock 74'; Rudy 84'	Stadium: Olympiastadion; Attendance: 39,604; Referee: Peter Sippel

1 February 2015 18	FC Augsburg	3–1	1899 Hoffenheim	Augsburg
17:30 CET (UTC+01:00)	Feulner (yellow card) 17'; Altıntop 39'; Werner 42'; Højbjerg (yellow card) 43'; Bobadilla 90+3'	Report	Abraham (yellow card) 41'; Roberto Firmino 45', (yellow card) 83'; Szalai (yellow card) 61'	Stadium: SGL arena Attendance: 27,090; Referee: Florian Meyer

4 February 2015 19	1899 Hoffenheim	1–2	Werder Bremen	Sinsheim
19:00 CET (UTC+01:00)	Bičakčić 34'; Rudy (yellow card) 82'	Report	Di Santo 8', (yellow card) 72'; Kroos (yellow card) 47'; Bargfrede 52'; García (yellow card) 65'; Bartels (yellow card) 90+3'	Stadium: Rhein-Neckar Arena; Attendance: 23,631; Referee: Guido Winkmann

7 February 2015 20	VfL Wolfsburg	3–0	1899 Hoffenheim	Wolfsburg
15:30 CET (UTC+01:00)	Dost 3'; De Bruyne 28', 84'; Schürrle (yellow card) 40'; Guilavogui (yellow card) 80'	Report	Polanski (yellow card) 51'	Stadium: Volkswagen Arena; Attendance: 26,356; Referee: Jochen Drees

14 February 2015 21	1899 Hoffenheim	2–1	VfB Stuttgart	Sinsheim
15:30 CET (UTC+01:00)	Schwegler (yellow card) 9'; Schipplock (yellow card) 25'; Roberto Firmino 30'; Abraham (yellow card) 61'; Rudy 90+3'	Report	Werner (yellow card) 35'; Sakai 39'; Niedermeier (yellow card) 43'; Gentner (yellow card) 79'	Stadium: Rhein-Neckar Arena; Attendance: 29,309; Referee: Tobias Welz

21 February 2015 22	SC Freiburg	1–1	1899 Hoffenheim	Freiburg im Breisgau
15:30 CET (UTC+01:00)	Philipp (yellow card) 15'; Höhn 25'; Guédé (yellow card) 79'; Torrejón (red card) 90+2'	Report	Schwegler (yellow card) 23'; Kim (yellow card) 31'; Volland 39'; Salihović (yellow card) 61'	Stadium: Dreisamstadion; Attendance: 23,800; Referee: Peter Gagelmann

28 February 2015 23	1899 Hoffenheim	2–0	Mainz 05	Sinsheim
15:30 CET (UTC+01:00)	Kim (yellow card) 13'; Salihović (yellow card) 41'; Volland 55'; Polanski (yellow card) 68', (goal) 76'	Report		Stadium: Rhein-Neckar Arena; Attendance: 24,310; Referee: Peter Sippel

7 March 2015 24	Schalke 04	3–1	1899 Hoffenheim	Gelsenkirchen
15:30 CET (UTC+01:00)	Fuchs 12', (yellow card) 17'; Meyer 41', 53'	Report	Strobl (yellow card) 11'; Volland 73'	Stadium: Veltins-Arena; Attendance: 60,607; Referee: Bastian Dankert

14 March 2015 25	1899 Hoffenheim	3–0	Hamburger SV	Sinsheim
15:30 CET (UTC+01:00)	Polanski 22' (pen.), 81'; Schwegler (yellow card) 56'; Rudy 87'	Report	Drobný (red card) 19'; Iličević (yellow card) 75'; Jiráček (yellow card) 81'	Stadium: Rhein-Neckar Arena; Attendance: 30,150; Referee: Günter Perl

21 March 2015 26	SC Paderborn	0–0	1899 Hoffenheim	Paderborn
15:30 CET (UTC+01:00)		Report	Bičakčić (yellow card) 55' (yellow-red card) 65'; Rudy (yellow card) 83'; Modeste (yellow card) 90+1'	Stadium: Benteler Arena; Attendance: 14,401; Referee: Markus Schmidt

4 April 2015 27	1899 Hoffenheim	1–4	Borussia Mönchengladbach	Sinsheim
15:30 CEST (UTC+02:00)	Schipplock 17'; Kim (yellow card) 45+2'; Abraham (yellow card) 63'; Rudy (yellow card) 90'	Report	Kruse 26' (pen.); Herrmann 31', 51'; Raffael 36'; Xhaka (yellow card) 69'; Kramer (yellow card) 82'	Stadium: Rhein-Neckar Arena; Attendance: 30,150; Referee: Thorsten Kinhöfer

12 April 2015 28	1. FC Köln	3–2	1899 Hoffenheim	Cologne
15:30 CEST (UTC+02:00)	Lehmann 20' (pen.), (yellow card) 71'; Maroh (yellow card) 29'; Vogt (yellow card) 44'; Ujah 54'; Olkowski (red card) 69'; Hector 78'; Bröker (yellow card) 87'	Report	Bičakčić (yellow card) 19'; Polanski 70' (pen.); Beck (yellow card) 80'; Modeste 88'	Stadium: RheinEnergieStadion; Attendance: 45,000; Referee: Peter Sippel

18 April 2015 29	1899 Hoffenheim	0–2	Bayern Munich	Sinsheim
15:30 CEST (UTC+02:00)	Rudy (yellow card) 19'; Beck (yellow card) 68'; Volland (yellow card) 70'	Report	Müller (yellow card) 21'; Dante (yellow card) 24'; Rode 38'; Rafinha (yellow card) 66'; Beck 90+3' (o.g.)	Stadium: Rhein-Neckar-Arena; Attendance: 30,150; Referee: Tobias Stieler

25 April 2015 30	Hannover 96	1–2	1899 Hoffenheim	Hanover
15:30 CEST (UTC+02:00)	Stindl 24' (pen.), (yellow card) 90+1'; Sané (yellow card) 41'; Schmiedebach (yellow card) 64'; Zieler (yellow card) 70'; Joselu (yellow card) 89'	Report	Modeste 1'; Strobl (yellow card) 23'; Bičakčić (yellow card) 41'; Schipplock 83'	Stadium: Niedersachsenstadion; Attendance: 46,200; Referee: Günter Perl

2 May 2015 31	1899 Hoffenheim	1–1	Borussia Dortmund	Sinsheim
15:30 CEST (UTC+02:00)	Roberto Firmino (yellow card) 26'; Volland 33'	Report	Hummels 35'; Kehl (yellow card) 48'; Kampl (yellow card) 55'; Durm (yellow card) 72'	Stadium: Rhein-Neckar Arena; Attendance: 30,150; Referee: Jochen Drees

9 May 2015 32	Eintracht Frankfurt	3–1	1899 Hoffenheim	Frankfurt
15:30 CEST (UTC+02:00)	Oczipka 18'; Seferovic 27', (yellow card) 45'; Chandler 34'; Russ (yellow card) 50'; Aigner (yellow card) 69'	Report	Volland (yellow card) 5', (goal) 51'; Polanski (yellow card) 45'; Roberto Firmino (yellow card) 90+1'	Stadium: Commerzbank-Arena; Attendance: 50,600; Referee: Daniel Siebert

16 May 2015 33	Bayer Leverkusen	2–0	1899 Hoffenheim	Leverkusen
15:30 CEST (UTC+02:00)	Çalhanoğlu 45+1'; Toprak (yellow card) 55'; Kießling 61'; Rolfes (yellow card) 71'	Report		Stadium: BayArena; Attendance: 29,072; Referee: Robert Hartmann

23 May 2015 34	1899 Hoffenheim	2–1	Hertha BSC	Sinsheim
15:30 CEST (UTC+02:00)	Strobl (yellow card) 1'; Modeste 8'; Rudy (yellow card) 29'; Roberto Firmino 80'	Report	Stocker (yellow card) 44'; Beerens 72'; Burchert (yellow card) 81'	Stadium: Rhein-Neckar Arena; Attendance: 30,150; Referee: Knut Kircher

=== DFB-Pokal ===
17 August 2014 Round 1	USC Paloma	0–9	1899 Hoffenheim	Hamburg
14:00 CEST (UTC+02:00)	Kramer (yellow card) 71'; Drews (yellow card) 77'	Report	Elyounoussi 9', (yellow card) 31'; Bičakčić 17'; Schipplock 18', 28', 33', 45', 54'; Szalai 34'; Modeste 90'	Stadium: Stadion Hoheluft; Attendance: 4,750; Referee: Sören Storks

29 October 2014 Round 2	1899 Hoffenheim	5–1	FSV Frankfurt	Hoffenheim
20:30 CET (UTC+01:00)	Schipplock 23'; Vestergaard 45+3'; Roberto Firmino (yellow card) 51', (goal) 57', 90'; Modeste 72'	Report	Oumari (yellow card) 20'; Balitsch (yellow card) 75'; Schembri 80'	Stadium: Rhein-Neckar-Arena; Attendance: 11,441; Referee: Jochen Drees

3 March 2015 Round 3	VfR Aalen	0–2	1899 Hoffenheim	Aalen
19:00 CET (UTC+01:00)	Quaner (yellow card) 29'; Gjasula (yellow card) 53'; Feick (yellow card) 77'	Report	Polanski 16'; Beck (yellow card) 28'; Volland (yellow card) 55', (goal) 56'	Stadium: Scholz-Arena; Attendance: 8,252; Referee: Sascha Stegemann

7 April 2015 Quarterfinals	Borussia Dortmund	3–2 (a.e.t.)	1899 Hoffenheim	Dortmund
20:30 CEST (UTC+02:00)	Subotić 19'; Aubameyang 57'; Kehl 107', (yellow card) 117'; Błaszczykowski (yellow card) 112'	Report	Volland 21', (yellow card) 89'; Roberto Firmino 27', (yellow card) 90+2'; Schipplock (yellow card) 53'; Schwegler (yellow card) 55'; Bičakčić (yellow card) 112'	Stadium: Westfalenstadion; Attendance: 80,667; Referee: Deniz Aytekin

== Statistics ==
=== Appearances and goals ===
No.	Pos	Nat	Player	Total		Bundesliga		DFB-Pokal	
No.	Pos	Nat	Player	Apps	Goals	Apps	Goals	Apps	Goals
Goalkeepers
1	GK	(Germany) GER	Oliver Baumann	37	0	34	0	3	0
13	GK	(Germany) GER	Jens Grahl	2	0	0	0	2	0
33	GK	(Germany) GER	Alexander Stolz	0	0	0	0	0	0
35	GK	(Germany) GER	Marvin Schwäbe	0	0	0	0	0	0
Defenders
2	DF	(Germany) GER	Andreas Beck	36	0	33	0	3	0
4	DF	(Bosnia and Herzegovina) BIH	Ermin Bičakčić	28	2	24	1	4	1
15	DF	(Germany) GER	Jeremy Toljan	8	0	6	0	2	0
19	DF	(Argentina) ARG	David Abraham	15	0	14	0	1	0
20	DF	(South Korea) KOR	Kim Jin-su	21	0	19	0	2	0
21	DF	(Nigeria) NGR	Kevin Akpoguma	0	0	0	0	0	0
22	DF	(Germany) GER	Nicolai Rapp	0	0	0	0	0	0
25	DF	(Germany) GER	Niklas Süle	17	1	15	1	2	0
Midfielders
6	MF	(Germany) GER	Sebastian Rudy	33	4	29	4	4	0
8	MF	(Poland) POL	Eugen Polanski	33	6	30	5	3	1
12	MF	(Germany) GER	Tobias Strobl	34	0	30	0	4	0
16	MF	(Switzerland) SUI	Pirmin Schwegler	31	1	28	1	3	0
17	MF	(Switzerland) SUI	Steven Zuber	21	0	17	0	4	0
23	MF	(Bosnia and Herzegovina) BIH	Sejad Salihovic	13	2	13	2	0	0
26	MF	(Germany) GER	Janik Haberer	0	0	0	0	0	0
34	MF	(Germany) GER	Nadiem Amiri	9	0	7	0	2	0
Forwards
9	FW	(Germany) GER	Sven Schipplock	29	9	25	3	4	6
10	FW	(Brazil) BRA	Roberto Firmino	36	10	33	7	3	3
14	FW	(Norway) NOR	Tarik Elyounoussi	26	5	25	4	1	1
27	FW	(France) FRA	Anthony Modeste	29	9	26	7	3	2
28	FW	(Hungary) HUN	Ádám Szalai	27	5	26	4	1	1
31	FW	(Germany) GER	Kevin Volland	36	10	32	8	4	2
38	FW	(Germany) GER	Kai Herdling	1	0	1	0	0	0
Players transferred out during the season
11	MF	(Iraq) IRQ	Jiloan Hamad	1	0	1	0	0	0
29	DF	(Denmark) DEN	Jannik Vestergaard	7	2	6	1	1	1
30	GK	(Belgium) BEL	Koen Casteels	0	0	0	0	0	0
41	FW	(Zimbabwe) ZIM	Knowledge Musona	0	0	0	0	0	0

Last updated: 29 November 2021
Source: DFB

=== Goalscorers ===
This includes all competitive matches. The list is sorted by shirt number when total goals are equal.

Rank	Pos	No.	Nat	Name	Bundesliga	DFB-Pokal	Total
1	FW	9	(Germany)	Sven Schipplock	0	5	5
1	MF	14	(Norway)	Tarik Elyounoussi	4	1	5
3	FW	27	(France)	Anthony Modeste	2	1	3
3	FW	28	(Hungary)	Ádám Szalai	2	1	3
5	DF	4	(Bosnia and Herzegovina)	Ermin Bičakčić	0	1	1
5	MF	6	(Germany)	Sebastian Rudy	1	0	1
5	MF	10	(Brazil)	Roberto Firmino	1	0	1
5	DF	29	(Denmark)	Jannik Vestergaard	1	0	1
TOTALS					11	9	20

Last updated on 5 October
