= List of German football transfers winter 2014–15 =

This is a list of German football transfers in the winter transfer window 2014–15 by club. Only transfers of the Bundesliga, and 2. Bundesliga are included.

== Bundesliga ==
=== Bayern Munich ===
In:

Out:

Note: Flags indicate national team as has been defined under FIFA eligibility rules. Players may hold more than one non-FIFA nationality.

No.	Pos.	Nation	Player

No.	Pos.	Nation	Player
11	MF	SUI	Xherdan Shaqiri (to Inter Milan)
34	MF	DEN	Pierre-Emile Højbjerg (on loan to FC Augsburg)

=== Borussia Dortmund ===
In:

No.	Pos.	Nation	Player
23	MF	SVN	Kevin Kampl (from Red Bull Salzburg)

Out:

No.	Pos.	Nation	Player
23	FW	KOR	Ji Dong-won (to FC Augsburg)

=== FC Schalke 04 ===
In:

No.	Pos.	Nation	Player
31	DF	SRB	Matija Nastasić (on loan from Manchester City)
--	MF	SWE	Christian Rubio Sivodedov (from Djurgårdens IF)

Out:

No.	Pos.	Nation	Player
11	FW	GER	Christian Clemens (on loan to 1. FSV Mainz 05)
29	FW	GER	Donis Avdijaj (on loan to Sturm Graz)

=== Bayer 04 Leverkusen ===
In:

No.	Pos.	Nation	Player
16	DF	CRO	Tin Jedvaj (from A.S. Roma, previously on loan)

Out:

No.	Pos.	Nation	Player
15	MF	GER	Levin Öztunalı (on loan to Werder Bremen)
30	GK	GER	Niklas Lomb (on loan to Hallescher FC)

=== VfL Wolfsburg ===
In:

No.	Pos.	Nation	Player
17	MF	GER	André Schürrle (from Chelsea)
29	MF	CHN	Zhang Xizhe (from Beijing Guoan)
--	GK	BEL	Koen Casteels (from 1899 Hoffenheim)

Out:

No.	Pos.	Nation	Player
11	FW	CRO	Ivica Olić (to Hamburger SV)
--	GK	BEL	Koen Casteels (on loan to Werder Bremen)

=== Borussia Mönchengladbach ===
In:

No.	Pos.	Nation	Player

Out:

No.	Pos.	Nation	Player

=== 1. FSV Mainz 05 ===
In:

No.	Pos.	Nation	Player
7	DF	SWE	Pierre Bengtsson (from F.C. Copenhagen)
22	FW	CHI	Nicolas Castillo (from Club Brugge KV)
27	FW	GER	Christian Clemens (on loan from FC Schalke 04)

Out:

No.	Pos.	Nation	Player
10	FW	SRB	Filip Đuričić (on loan to Southampton F.C.)
22	MF	GER	Julian Koch (on loan to FC St. Pauli)
35	FW	SVN	Petar Slišković (to FC Aarau)

=== FC Augsburg ===
In:

No.	Pos.	Nation	Player
16	DF	GER	Christoph Janker (from Hertha BSC)
19	MF	DEN	Pierre-Emile Højbjerg (on loan from Bayern Munich)
22	FW	KOR	Ji Dong-won (from Borussia Dortmund)

Out:

No.	Pos.	Nation	Player
3	DF	GER	Ronny Philp (on loan to Greuther Fürth)
26	FW	GER	Erik Thommy (on loan to 1. FC Kaiserslautern)

=== 1899 Hoffenheim ===
In:

No.	Pos.	Nation	Player

Out:

No.	Pos.	Nation	Player
11	MF	SWE	Jiloan Hamad (on loan to Standard Liège)
24	DF	GER	Patrick Schorr (on loan to FSV Frankfurt)
29	DF	DEN	Jannik Vestergaard (to Werder Bremen)
30	GK	BEL	Koen Casteels (to VfL Wolfsburg, then on loan to Werder Bremen)
--	FW	ZIM	Knowledge Musona (to K.V. Oostende, previously on loan at Kaizer Chiefs)
--	MF	BRA	Guilherme Biteco (on loan to Santa Cruz, previously on loan at Vasco da Gama)

=== Hannover 96 ===
In:

No.	Pos.	Nation	Player
17	DF	POR	João Pereira (from Valencia CF)
30	FW	CIV	Didier Ya Konan (from Ittihad FC)

Out:

No.	Pos.	Nation	Player
17	DF	GER	Stefan Thesker (to SpVgg Greuther Fürth)
27	DF	GER	Vladimir Ranković (on loan to Erzgebirge Aue)
30	DF	GER	Florian Ballas (to FSV Frankfurt)
--	MF	SUI	Adrian Nikçi (to 1. FC Nürnberg, previously on loan at BSC Young Boys)

=== Hertha BSC ===
In:

No.	Pos.	Nation	Player

Out:

No.	Pos.	Nation	Player
6	DF	GER	Christoph Janker (to FC Augsburg)
34	MF	GER	Hany Mukhtar (to S.L. Benfica)

=== Werder Bremen ===
In:

No.	Pos.	Nation	Player
7	DF	DEN	Jannik Vestergaard (from 1899 Hoffenheim)
11	MF	GER	Levin Öztunalı (on loan from Bayer Leverkusen)
20	GK	BEL	Koen Casteels (on loan from VfL Wolfsburg, previously at 1899 Hoffenheim)
30	GK	GER	Michael Zetterer (from SpVgg Unterhaching)

Out:

No.	Pos.	Nation	Player
7	MF	POL	Ludovic Obraniak (on loan to Çaykur Rizespor)
11	MF	NED	Eljero Elia (on loan to Southampton)
24	FW	GER	Nils Petersen (on loan to SC Freiburg)
25	DF	GER	Oliver Hüsing (on loan to Hansa Rostock)

=== Eintracht Frankfurt ===
In:

No.	Pos.	Nation	Player
3	FW	GAM	Yusupha Yaffa (from AC Milan youth)
29	GK	AZE	Emil Balayev (from Neftchi PFK)

Out:

No.	Pos.	Nation	Player

=== SC Freiburg ===
In:

No.	Pos.	Nation	Player
16	MF	NOR	Mats Møller Dæhli (from Cardiff City)
18	FW	GER	Nils Petersen (on loan from Werder Bremen)

Out:

No.	Pos.	Nation	Player
9	FW	AUT	Philipp Zulechner (on loan to Austria Wien)
35	FW	GER	Sebastian Freis (to SpVgg Greuther Fürth)
37	MF	GER	Sebastian Kerk (on loan to 1. FC Nürnberg)

=== VfB Stuttgart ===
In:

No.	Pos.	Nation	Player
26	MF	CIV	Serey Die (from FC Basel)

Out:

No.	Pos.	Nation	Player
26	MF	AUT	Raphael Holzhauser (to Austria Wien)
--	MF	NZL	Marco Rojas (on loan to FC Thun, previously on loan at Greuther Fürth)

=== Hamburger SV ===
In:

No.	Pos.	Nation	Player
8	FW	CRO	Ivica Olić (from VfL Wolfsburg)
20	MF	CHI	Marcelo Diaz (from FC Basel)

Out:

No.	Pos.	Nation	Player
18	MF	GER	Tolgay Arslan (to Beşiktaş J.K.)

=== 1. FC Köln ===
In:

No.	Pos.	Nation	Player
20	FW	BRA	Deyverson (on loan from Belenenses)

Out:

No.	Pos.	Nation	Player
23	FW	GER	Simon Zoller (on loan to 1. FC Kaiserslautern)

=== SC Paderborn 07 ===
In:

No.	Pos.	Nation	Player
29	FW	CRO	Srđan Lakić (from 1. FC Kaiserslautern)

Out:

No.	Pos.	Nation	Player
24	FW	GER	Viktor Maier (to Alemannia Aachen)

== 2. Bundesliga ==
=== 1. FC Nürnberg ===
In:

No.	Pos.	Nation	Player
9	MF	AUT	Guido Burgstaller (from Cardiff City)
17	MF	GER	Sebastian Kerk (on loan from SC Freiburg)
23	MF	SUI	Adrian Nikçi (from Hannover 96, previously on loan at BSC Young Boys)

Out:

No.	Pos.	Nation	Player
23	MF	POR	Daniel Candeias (loan return to S.L. Benfica, then on loan to Granada CF)
29	DF	ECU	Cristian Ramírez (loan return to Fortuna Düsseldorf, then on loan to Ferencváros)

=== Eintracht Braunschweig ===
In:

No.	Pos.	Nation	Player
9	FW	DEN	Emil Berggreen (from Hobro IK)
12	MF	SVN	Nik Omladič (from Olimpija Ljubljana)

Out:

No.	Pos.	Nation	Player
9	FW	SUI	Orhan Ademi (on loan to VfR Aalen)
17	MF	GER	Björn Kluft (to Rot-Weiss Essen)
23	FW	NOR	Mushaga Bakenga (loan return to Club Brugge)
27	FW	GER	Gianluca Korte (on loan to VfR Aalen)

=== SpVgg Greuther Fürth ===
In:

No.	Pos.	Nation	Player
4	DF	GER	Stefan Thesker (from Hannover 96)
9	FW	GER	Sebastian Freis (from SC Freiburg)
27	DF	GER	Ronny Philp (On loan from FC Augsburg)

Out:

No.	Pos.	Nation	Player
18	MF	NZL	Marco Rojas (loan return to VfB Stuttgart)
17	MF	GER	Thomas Pledl (to FC Ingolstadt 04)

=== 1. FC Kaiserslautern ===
In:

No.	Pos.	Nation	Player
9	FW	GER	Simon Zoller (on loan from 1. FC Köln)
18	FW	GER	Erik Thommy (on loan from FC Augsburg)

Out:

No.	Pos.	Nation	Player
8	FW	MNE	Stefan Mugoša (on loan to FC Erzgebirge Aue)
9	FW	CRO	Srđan Lakić (to SC Paderborn 07)

=== Karlsruher SC ===
In:

No.	Pos.	Nation	Player
20	DF	AUT	Ylli Sallahi (from Bayern Munich)

Out:

No.	Pos.	Nation	Player
10	MF	TUR	Selçuk Alibaz (to Erzgebirge Aue)
28	FW	NED	Koen van der Biezen (to Arminia Bielefeld)
30	DF	GER	Mirko Schuster (to SG Sonnenhof Großaspach)

=== Fortuna Düsseldorf ===
In:

No.	Pos.	Nation	Player

Out:

No.	Pos.	Nation	Player
36	FW	GER	Timm Golley (on loan to FSV Frankfurt)
—	DF	ECU	Cristian Ramírez (on loan to Ferencváros, previously on loan at 1. FC Nürnberg)

=== 1860 Munich ===
In:

No.	Pos.	Nation	Player
8	DF	GHA	Anthony Annan (from HJK Helsinki)

Out:

No.	Pos.	Nation	Player
3	DF	POL	Grzegorz Wojtkowiak (to Lechia Gdańsk)
14	FW	CRO	Marin Tomasov (to HNK Rijeka)
17	DF	GER	Sebastian Hertner (on loan to Erzgebirge Aue)

=== FC St. Pauli ===
In:

No.	Pos.	Nation	Player
2	MF	GER	Julian Koch (on loan from 1. FSV Mainz 05)
28	FW	POL	Waldemar Sobota (on loan from Club Brugge KV)
40	MF	PAN	Armando Cooper (from Godoy Cruz)

Out:

No.	Pos.	Nation	Player
28	MF	GER	Bentley Baxter Bahn (to Stuttgarter Kickers)

=== 1. FC Union Berlin ===
In:

No.	Pos.	Nation	Player

Out:

No.	Pos.	Nation	Player
8	MF	GER	Barış Özbek (to Kayserispor)
10	MF	GER	Martin Dausch (to MSV Duisburg)
32	FW	SVK	Adam Nemec (to New York City FC)

=== FC Ingolstadt 04 ===
In:

No.	Pos.	Nation	Player
19	MF	GER	Max Christiansen (from Hansa Rostock)
30	MF	GER	Thomas Pledl (from Greuther Fürth)

Out:

No.	Pos.	Nation	Player

=== VfR Aalen ===
In:

No.	Pos.	Nation	Player
--	FW	SUI	Orhan Ademi (on loan from Eintracht Braunschweig)
--	FW	GER	Gianluca Korte (on loan from Eintracht Braunschweig)

Out:

No.	Pos.	Nation	Player
20	MF	GER	Manuel Junglas (to Arminia Bielefeld)

=== SV Sandhausen ===
In:

No.	Pos.	Nation	Player
--	FW	NGA	Solomon Okoronkwo (from FC Erzgebirge Aue)

Out:

No.	Pos.	Nation	Player
37	MF	GER	Marvin Knoll (to SSV Jahn Regensburg)

=== FSV Frankfurt ===
In:

No.	Pos.	Nation	Player
19	DF	GER	Patrick Schorr (on loan from 1899 Hoffenheim)
25	DF	GER	Florian Ballas (from Hannover 96)
36	MF	GER	Timm Golley (on loan from Fortuna Düsseldorf)

Out:

No.	Pos.	Nation	Player

=== FC Erzgebirge Aue ===
In:

No.	Pos.	Nation	Player
2	DF	GER	Benedikt Krug (from TSV Schwabmünchen)
9	FW	MNE	Stefan Mugoša (on loan from 1. FC Kaiserslautern)
16	DF	GER	Vladimir Ranković (on loan from Hannover 96)
17	DF	GER	Sebastian Hertner (on loan from TSV 1860 München)
25	MF	GER	Clemens Fandrich (on loan from RB Leipzig)
38	MF	TUR	Selçuk Alibaz (from Karlsruher SC)

Out:

No.	Pos.	Nation	Player
24	FW	EST	Henri Anier (to Dundee United)
26	FW	NGA	Solomon Okoronkwo (to SV Sandhausen)

=== VfL Bochum ===
In:

No.	Pos.	Nation	Player
13	DF	GER	Felix Bastians (Free agent)
23	MF	GER	Thomas Eisfeld (on loan from Fulham F.C.)

Out:

No.	Pos.	Nation	Player

=== 1. FC Heidenheim ===
In:

No.	Pos.	Nation	Player
17	FW	GER	Andreas Voglsammer (from SpVgg Unterhaching)

Out:

No.	Pos.	Nation	Player

=== RB Leipzig ===
In:

No.	Pos.	Nation	Player
--	FW	ISR	Omer Damari (from Austria Wien)
--	FW	GER	Nils Quaschner (from Red Bull Salzburg)
12	FW	SWE	Emil Forsberg (from Malmö FF)
--	FW	PER	Yordy Reyna (on loan from Red Bull Salzburg, previously on loan at SV Grödig)

Out:

No.	Pos.	Nation	Player
19	FW	POL	Matthias Morys (on loan to Sonnenhof Großaspach)
32	FW	GER	Federico Palacios Martínez (on loan to FC Rot-Weiß Erfurt)
34	MF	GER	Clemens Fandrich (on loan to Erzgebirge Aue)

=== SV Darmstadt 98 ===
In:

No.	Pos.	Nation	Player

Out:

No.	Pos.	Nation	Player
6	MF	GER	Julius Biada (to Fortuna Köln)
22	DF	GER	Aaron Berzel (to Preußen Münster)

== See also ==
- 2014–15 Bundesliga
- 2014–15 2. Bundesliga
