= Kevin Volland =

German footballer

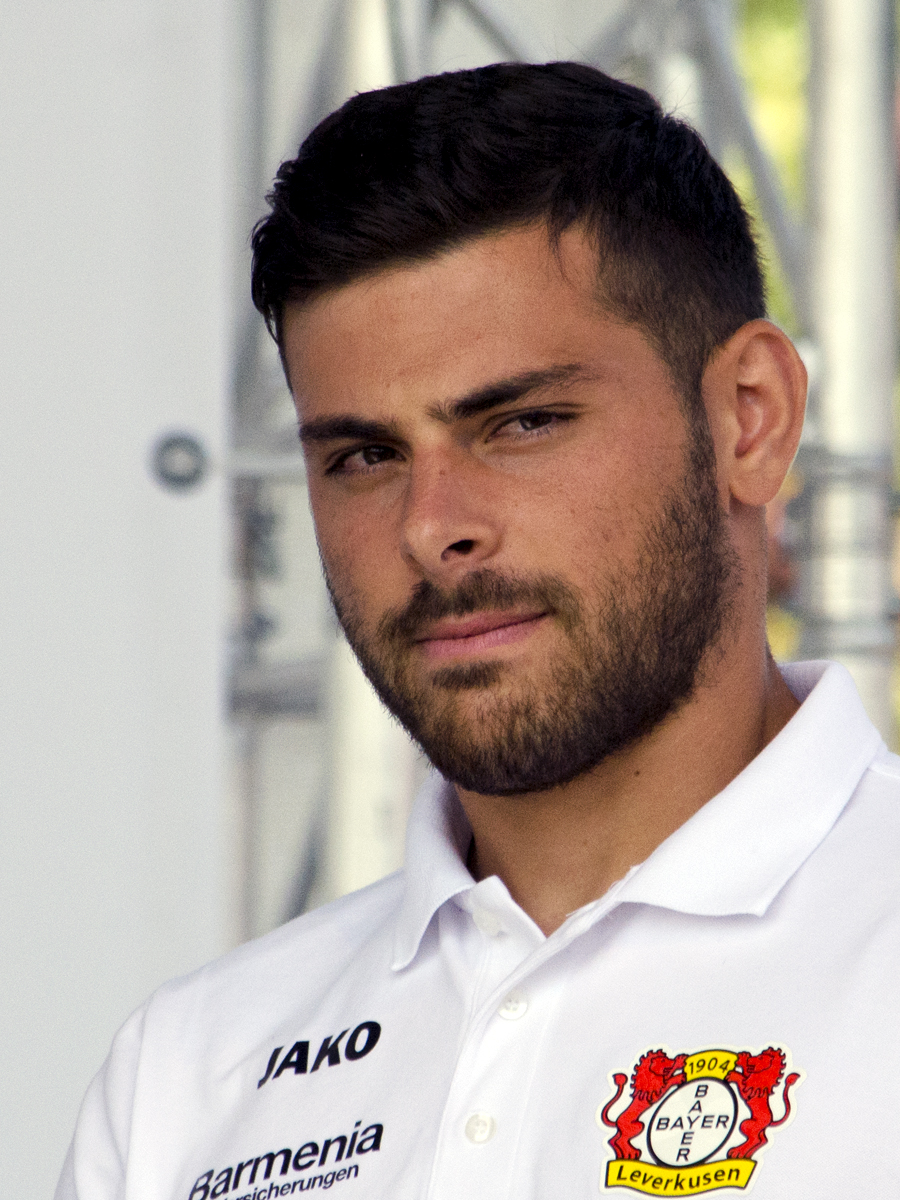
- Volland with Bayer Leverkusen in 2018

Personal information
- Full name: Kevin Volland
- Date of birth: 30 July 1992 (age 34)
- Place of birth: Marktoberdorf, Germany
- Height: 1.79 m (5 ft 10 in)
- Positions: Striker; winger

Youth career
- 1995–2005: FC Thalhofen
- 2005–2006: FC Memmingen
- 2006–2007: TSG Thannhausen
- 2007–2011: 1860 Munich

Senior career*
Years	Team	Apps	(Gls)
2010–2012	1860 Munich	57	(20)
2012–2016	TSG Hoffenheim	132	(33)
2016–2020	Bayer Leverkusen	115	(44)
2020–2023	Monaco	86	(28)
2023–2025	Union Berlin	30	(3)
2025–2026	1860 Munich	31	(4)

International career^{‡}
2008–2009	Germany U17	6	(2)
2009–2010	Germany U18	8	(5)
2010–2011	Germany U19	10	(6)
2011	Germany U20	2	(1)
2012–2015	Germany U21	22	(11)
2014–2021	Germany	15	(1)
- * Club domestic league appearances and goals as of 27 May 2026 ‡ National team caps and goals as of 18:53, 14 November 2021 (UTC)

Kevin Volland (born 30 July 1992) is a German former professional footballer who played as a striker or a winger. He had 15 caps for the Germany national team.

Volland gained prominence at the 2015 UEFA European Under-21 Championship where he was awarded the Silver Boot.

== Club career ==
=== Youth ===
After starting his football career with FC Thalhofen, Volland transferred to FC Memmingen's C-Youth squad, playing in the Bavarian League, the top amateur division at that time. After relegation in 2006, he moved on to TSG Thannhausen, in order to remain in the higher division. During the summer of 2007, he joined 1860 Munich's youth academy, where he also lived on the club's grounds. During the 2009–10 season, he started 23 matches for 1860 München's U19 team, scoring seven goals. Twice that season, he made the bench for the U23 squad competing in the Regionalliga Süd, although he was an unused substitute.

=== 1860 Munich ===
At the start of the 2010–11 season, 1860 coach Reiner Maurer promoted him along with other A-Youth level players Moritz Leitner, Daniel Hofstetter, and Markus Ziereis to the professional squad of TSV 1860. Volland went on to feature in 12 of 1860's first 14 matches. On 14 August 2010, he made his competitive debut for 1860 alongside Moritz Leitner, when he came off the bench in the cup match in Verl. Afterwards, he played two more matches for the U-19s and three more matches for the Regionalliga squad, scoring four goals for the former and two for the latter. He played his first match for the senior team in the 2. Bundesliga on 26 September 2010, coming off the bench against FC Augsburg. By the start of the winter break, he had featured in a further six matches.

In January 2011, Volland signed a contract with Bundesliga side TSG 1899 Hoffenheim through 2015, but initially remained in Munich. The agreement ran through the summer of 2012, with Hoffenheim having the option to bring him in during the winter transfer period of 2011–12. While playing in Osnabrück on 21 January 2011, he scored his first competitive goal for 1860's 2. Bundesliga squad. Volland found himself in the starting line-up for the remaining fifteen matches of the season. He scored a further five goals in those matches and assisted on four more. After the end of the second division season, he rejoined the 1860 U19s who had qualified for the semi-final of the German U19 Championship. He started in both matches against 1. FC Kaiserslautern, although 1860 would fail to reach the final.

At the start of the next season, Volland once again featured as a regular player for 1860, playing in the team's first six matches while scoring four goals and assisting on two more. 1899 Hoffenheim elected not to take the option to bring in Volland during the winter break, allowing him more time to mature in the 2. Bundesliga. Up to the winter break, Volland was one of the most prolific 1860 players, featuring in 21 official matches, while scoring ten goals and assisting on six more. At the end of the second division season, Volland topped the 1860 scoring charts, beating out strike partner Benjamin Lauth and winger Stefan Aigner, who both finished with eleven goals each. Overall, Volland scored 20 goals in 57 league matches for 1860, while contributing a further goal in three cup matches.

=== 1899 Hoffenheim ===
At the start of the 2012–13 season, Volland finally joined the Kraichgau outfit a year and a half after originally signing. On 3 November 2012, he scored his first Bundesliga goal in his tenth competitive match for Hoffenheim in a victory over Schalke 04. During his first season with the club, Volland established himself as a regular in the squad. Throughout the 2012–13 season, Volland scored six goals and provided a further 12 assists. During the 2013–14 season, Volland improved his scoring total, registering nine goals and contributing a further eight assists. As a reward for his strong start with the club, Hoffenheim extended his contract on 28 July 2013, through 2017.

On 22 August 2015, Volland equalled the record for the fastest goal in Bundesliga history with a ninth second opener in a 2–1 loss to champions Bayern Munich.

=== Bayer Leverkusen ===
On 20 May 2016, Volland joined Bayer Leverkusen on a five-year deal for a club record transfer fee of €18 million. He scored his first goals for the club on 26 October, netting a brace in a 2–2 penalty shoot-out loss against 3. Liga side Sportfreunde Lotte in the DFB Pokal.

=== Monaco ===
On 2 September 2020, Volland signed a contract with Monaco until 2024. On 1 November 2020, he scored his first two goals in Monaco's win over Girondins de Bordeaux in the Ligue 1.

In the first match of the 2021–22 season, against Sparta Prague in the preliminary round of the Champions League, he scored his team's second goal with an assist from Sofiane Diop.

=== Union Berlin ===
On 17 August 2023, Volland signed a contract with Union Berlin ahead of their inaugural Champions League campaign. On 12 December 2023, he scored his first Champions League goal for the club, giving his side the lead in a 2–3 loss to Real Madrid in the Olympiastadion. In April 2025, with his contract running until 2026, it was announced that Volland would leave Union Berlin in the summer to return to former club 1860 Munich. At the time, he had made four appearances in the 2024–25 season.

=== Return to 1860 Munich ===
In April 2025, 1860 Munich announced that Volland would be returning to the club for the 2025–26 season. He was, along with other new signings, the top transfer and was expected to help the team achieve promotion to the 2. Bundesliga.

=== Retirement ===
On 2 July 2026, Volland announced the end of his professional football career.

== International career ==
=== Youth ===
On 16 October 2008, Volland made his debut in German colors, being included in the starting line-up for the German U17 squad featuring against the Czech Republic. Three days later, he again started for the side against Russia. In the fall of 2009, Volland was recalled to the German squad for the 2009 FIFA U-17 World Cup in Nigeria. He came on in the final group match against Honduras, where he scored his first goal for the U17 team. He would also feature in the round of 16 loss to eventual tournament winners, Switzerland.

By July 2009, Volland had received his first call-up to the German U18 squad. In the Northern Ireland Milk Cup he played in all three matches for Germany, scoring against Northern Ireland selection, the United States and Bulgaria. Less than a year later, by May 2010, he had already featured in five matches for the German U19 squad, having scored two goals.

Volland was called up to the U19 squad during the summer of 2010. He made his debut for the team on 18 August 2010, in a match against Belgium. His first goal followed on 3 September against the Netherlands. By the winter break, he had featured in five matches and scored four goals. During the spring, he would go on to make three more appearances, scoring one goal.

On 31 August, Volland played his first match for the German U20 squad, also scoring his first goal. In early August, Volland was awarded the bronze Fritz Walter Medal in the U19 age by the DFB. U21 coach Rainer Adrion selected Volland for matches against Bosnia and Herzegovina and San Marino on 6 and 10 October of the year, but he was forced to cancel his participation due to injury. He eventually made his U21 debut on 29 February 2012, when he came off the bench in a match against Greece.

In June 2015, Volland captained the under-21 team at the 2015 European Championship in the Czech Republic, starting all four matches. In their opening game at the Letná Stadium in Prague, he assisted on Emre Can's 17th-minute equaliser from the edge of the penalty area in a 1–1 draw against Serbia. In their second group match at the Eden Arena in Prague against Denmark, he opened the scoring in the 32nd minute with a smart finish, following Emre Can's slide-rule pass. Volland doubled the lead three minutes into the second half thanks to a delightfully weighted free-kick from 25 metres out. Matthias Ginter rounded off the scoring to head in Amin Younes' cross just five minutes later, leading to a 3–0 victory. Volland was awarded the Silver Boot as second highest goalscorer with two goals and one assist, and was also included in the team of the tournament.

=== Senior ===
On 8 May 2014, Volland was called up to the Germany national team for the first time and made his debut in a friendly goalless draw against Poland five days later. He was also included in Germany's preliminary 30-man roster for the 2014 FIFA World Cup in Brazil; however did not make the final 23-man squad, which went on to win the tournament. On 11 November 2016, Volland scored his first ever goal for Germany in an 8–0 2018 World Cup qualification win against San Marino.

Following a prolific club season with Monaco, Volland was included in Germany's final 26-man squad for the UEFA Euro 2020 on 19 May 2021.

== Personal life ==
Volland married long-term girlfriend Katja Fichtl in June 2017, and they celebrated the birth of their first child, a girl, in March 2018.

== Career statistics ==
=== Club ===
As of match played 3 May 2025

Appearances and goals by club, season and competition
Club	Season	League			National cup (Note: Includes DFB-Pokal, Coupe de France)		Continental		Other		Total	
Club	Season	Division	Apps	Goals	Apps	Goals	Apps	Goals	Apps	Goals	Apps	Goals
1860 Munich II	2010–11	Regionalliga Süd	5	4	—		—		—		5	4
1860 Munich	2010–11	2. Bundesliga	24	6	1	0	—		—		25	6
1860 Munich	2011–12	2. Bundesliga	33	14	2	1	—		—		35	15
1860 Munich	Total		57	20	3	1	—		—		60	21
1899 Hoffenheim	2012–13	Bundesliga	34	6	1	0	—		2 (Note: Appearances in Bundesliga relegation play-offs)	0	37	6
1899 Hoffenheim	2013–14	Bundesliga	33	11	4	1	—		—		37	12
1899 Hoffenheim	2014–15	Bundesliga	32	8	4	2	—		—		36	10
1899 Hoffenheim	2015–16	Bundesliga	33	8	1	0	—		—		34	8
1899 Hoffenheim	Total		132	33	10	3	—		2	0	144	36
Bayer Leverkusen	2016–17	Bundesliga	23	6	2	2	6 (Note: Appearances in UEFA Champions League)	1	—		31	9
Bayer Leverkusen	2017–18	Bundesliga	31	14	4	0	—		—		35	14
Bayer Leverkusen	2018–19	Bundesliga	34	14	3	1	5 (Note: Appearances in UEFA Europa League)	0	—		42	15
Bayer Leverkusen	2019–20	Bundesliga	27	10	4	1	9 (Note: Six appearances and one goal in UEFA Champions League, three appearances in UEFA Europa League)	1	—		40	12
Bayer Leverkusen	Total		115	44	13	4	20	2	—		148	50
Monaco	2020–21	Ligue 1	35	16	5	2	—		—		40	18
Monaco	2021–22	Ligue 1	34	9	5	3	12 (Note: Four appearances and one goal in UEFA Champions League, eight appearances and two goals in UEFA Europa League)	3	—		51	15
Monaco	2022–23	Ligue 1	17	3	0	0	7 (Note: Two appearances in UEFA Champions League, five appearances and three goals in UEFA Europa League)	3	—		24	6
Monaco	Total		86	28	10	5	19	6	—		115	39
Union Berlin	2023–24	Bundesliga	26	3	1	0	5	1	—		32	4
Union Berlin	2024–25	Bundesliga	4	0	1	0	—		—		5	0
Union Berlin	Total		30	3	2	0	5	1	—		37	4
Career total			420	132	38	13	44	9	2	0	504	154

=== International ===
As of match played 14 November 2021

Appearances and goals by national team and year
National team	Year	Apps	Goals
Germany	2014	3	0
Germany	2015	2	0
Germany	2016	5	1
Germany	2021	5	0
Total		15	1

Scores and results list Germany's goal tally first.

List of international goals scored by Kevin Volland
No.	Date	Venue	Opponent	Score	Result	Competition
1	11 November 2016	San Marino Stadium, Serravalle, San Marino	San Marino	8–0	8–0	2018 FIFA World Cup qualification

== Honours ==
Individual

- Fritz Walter Medal U19 Bronze: 2011
- UEFA European Under-21 Championship Silver Boot: 2015
- UEFA European Under-21 Championship Team of the Tournament: 2015
