= Kai Herdling =

German footballer (born 1984)

Personal information
- Date of birth: 27 June 1984 (age 42)
- Place of birth: Heidelberg, West Germany
- Height: 1.80 m (5 ft 11 in)
- Position: Striker

Youth career
- 1996–2000: SG Heidelberg-Kirchheim
- 2000–2002: SpVgg Neckarsteinach

Senior career*
Years	Team	Apps	(Gls)
2002–2008	1899 Hoffenheim	56	(7)
2002–2008	1899 Hoffenheim II	112	(77)
2008	Waldhof Mannheim	14	(11)
2009–2016	1899 Hoffenheim II	143	(59)
2010–2016	1899 Hoffenheim	25	(2)
2012	→ Philadelphia Union (loan)	4	(0)

Managerial career
- 2009–2010: 1899 Hoffenheim (U15 assistant)
- 2016–2018: 1899 Hoffenheim II (assistant)
- 2018–2020: 1899 Hoffenheim (U16)
- 2020: 1899 Hoffenheim (caretaker)
- 2020: 1899 Hoffenheim (U17)
- 2020–2022: 1899 Hoffenheim II
- * Club domestic league appearances and goals

Kai Herdling (born 27 June 1984) is a German former professional footballer who played as a striker, mostly for TSG 1899 Hoffenheim.

== Career ==
Born in Heidelberg, Herdling began his career with SG Heidelberg-Kirchheim and moved later to SpVgg Neckarsteinach in the youth ranks. At the beginning of the 2002–03 season, he joined TSG 1899 Hoffenheim in the Regionalliga Süd.

In the third round of the 2003–04 DFB-Pokal, Herdling scored the winning goal for Hoffenheim against Bundesliga side Bayer Leverkusen, which ended 3–2.

He left the club before the 2008–09 season to join Regionalliga team Waldhof Mannheim. After the first half of the 2008–09 season, Herdling returned to Hoffenheim on 26 January 2009.

His first 2. Bundesliga match was against FC Augsburg, on 28 March 2008. He scored his first second division goal in a 2–1 loss against Alemannia Aachen, on 13 April 2008.

He made his Bundesliga debut against Mainz 05, on 7 March 2010, but otherwise stayed with Hoffenheim's reserve team.

On 16 April 2012, Herdling was loaned out to the Philadelphia Union of Major League Soccer, and played for two months. In his time in America, he played in four league matches (starting three) and two Lamar Hunt U.S. Open Cup ties.

After he had scored twice in Hoffenheim's 9–0 DFB-Pokal first round win against SG Aumund-Vegesack, coach Markus Gisdol took him to the first-team squad for the 2013–14 season.

In May 2016, he ended his career without having made a single appearance in the 2015–16 season due to a chronic knee injury.

=== Coaching career ===
During his playing career, Herdling was already assistant coach to Frank Fröhling at Hoffenheim's U15s. He held this position from the 2009/10 season until his move to the USA in spring 2012.

After ending his career, Herdling became assistant coach alongside Andreas Ibertsberger for the 2016/17 season with Marco Wildersinn at Hoffenheim's second team, which played in the fourth-tier Regionalliga Südwest. After two seasons, he took over as head coach of the U16s for the 2018/19 season.

After the 2019/20 season at youth level was canceled due to the COVID-19 pandemic, Herdling took over Alfred Schreuder's Bundesliga team together with former assistant coach Matthias Kaltenbach and U19 coach Marcel Rapp from match day 31 of the 2019/20 season until the end of the season. The club described the transitional arrangement as a "team solution", with Kaltenbach as the official head coach. The coaching team won 3 of the final 4 matches and finished the season in 6th place, qualifying directly for the Europa League.

For the 2020/21 season, Herdling took over the U17s. At the beginning of October 2020, he took over the second team after Marco Wildersinn was released. In June 2022, he was succeeded in this role by Vincent Wagner and was to take on a new role at TSG while he began his training as a soccer instructor.

== Career statistics ==
As of 5 June 2012

Appearances and goals by club, season and competition
Club	Season	League			National cup		League cup		Continental		Total	
Club	Season	Division	Apps	Goals	Apps	Goals	Apps	Goals	Apps	Goals	Apps	Goals
Waldhof Mannheim	2008–09	Regionalliga Süd	14	11	0	0	0	0	0	0	14	11
1899 Hoffenheim	2009–10	Bundesliga	1	0	0	0	0	0	0	0	1	0
1899 Hoffenheim II	2010–11	Regionalliga Süd	30	19	0	0	0	0	0	0	30	19
1899 Hoffenheim II	2011–12	Regionalliga Süd	24	9	0	0	0	0	0	0	24	9
1899 Hoffenheim II	Total		54	28	0	0	0	0	0	0	54	28
Philadelphia Union	2012	Major League Soccer	4	0	2	0	0	0	0	0	6	0
Career total			73	39	2	0	0	0	0	0	75	39
