= Dominic Rau =

German footballer (born 1990)

Personal information
- Date of birth: 29 November 1990 (age 35)
- Place of birth: Bad Schlema, Germany
- Height: 1.87 m (6 ft 1 1/2 in)
- Position: Centre back

Youth career
- 1995–2009: Erzgebirge Aue

Senior career*
Years	Team	Apps	(Gls)
2009–2014	Erzgebirge Aue II	77	(5)
2010–2014	Erzgebirge Aue	25	(1)
2014–2016	Hallescher FC	48	(1)
2016–2018	1. FC Saarbrücken	30	(0)
2018–2019	Hessen Dreieich	22	(1)
2019	Bayern Alzenau	8	(0)
- * Club domestic league appearances and goals as of 00:47, 29 July 2019 (UTC)

Dominic Rau (born 29 November 1990) is a German footballer who most recently played for SC Hessen Dreieich.

== Career ==
=== Bayern Alzenau ===
On 27 September 2019 it was confirmed, that Rau had signed with FC Bayern Alzenau. In January 2020 29-year old Rau confirmed, that he would retire to complete his education as a police officer.
