= Marco Wildersinn =

German football coach

Personal information
- Full name: Marco Wildersinn
- Date of birth: 29 September 1980 (age 46)
- Place of birth: Baden-Baden, West Germany

Managerial career
- Years: Team
- 2014–2020: 1899 Hoffenheim II
- 2022–2024: Würzburger Kickers
- 2024–2026: Stuttgarter Kickers

Marco Wildersinn is a German football head coach who is currently the head coach of Stuttgarter Kickers. He had previously been the head coach of 1899 Hoffenheim II, Würzburger Kickers and Stuttgarter Kickers.

== Coaching career ==
=== Early career ===
Wildersinn was assistant coach of FC Nöttingen during the 2009–10 season and Karlsruher SC II from 2010 to 2012. He then became a head coach in SC Freiburg's youth department before becoming a head coach in Karlsruher SC's youth department.

=== 1899 Hoffenheim II ===
He started as head coach of 1899 Hoffenheim II on 4 April 2014. He first match as head coach was a 5–0 win against SC Pfullendorf on 6 April 2014. 1899 Hoffenheim II finished the 2014–15 Regionalliga Südwest season in ninth place. During the 2015–16 season, 1899 Hoffenheim II finished in third place. During the 2016–17 season, 1899 Hoffenheim II finished in fourth place. During the 2017–18 season, 1899 Hoffenheim II finished in sixth place. 2018–19 season, 1899 Hoffenheim II finished in 10th place. Due to COVID-19, Regionalliga Südwest 2019–20 season was cut short. 1899 Hoffenheim II got 22 matches in. 1899 Hoffenheim II finished the 2019–20 season in ninth place. He left 1899 Hoffenheim II on 7 October 2020. His final match as head coach was a 2–0 Steinbach Haiger on 3 October 2020.

=== Würzburger Kickers ===
He became head coach of Würzburger Kickers on 1 July 2022. His first match was a 1–1 draw against SpVgg Hankofen-Hailing on 15 July 2022. Würzburger Kickers finished the 2022–23 Regionalliga Bayern season in second place and got to the semi–finals of the Bavarian Cup.

== Coaching record ==
As of match played 30 August 2024

Team	From	To	Record					Ref.
Team	From	To	G	W	D	L	Win %	Ref.
1899 Hoffenheim II	4 April 2014	7 October 2020	212	90	51	71	42.45	
Würzburger Kickers	1 July 2022	30 June 2024	85	59	15	11	69.41	
Stuttgarter Kickers	1 July 2024	present	8	5	3	0	62.50	
Total			305	154	69	82	50.49	—
