= Patrick Schorr =

German footballer (born 1994)

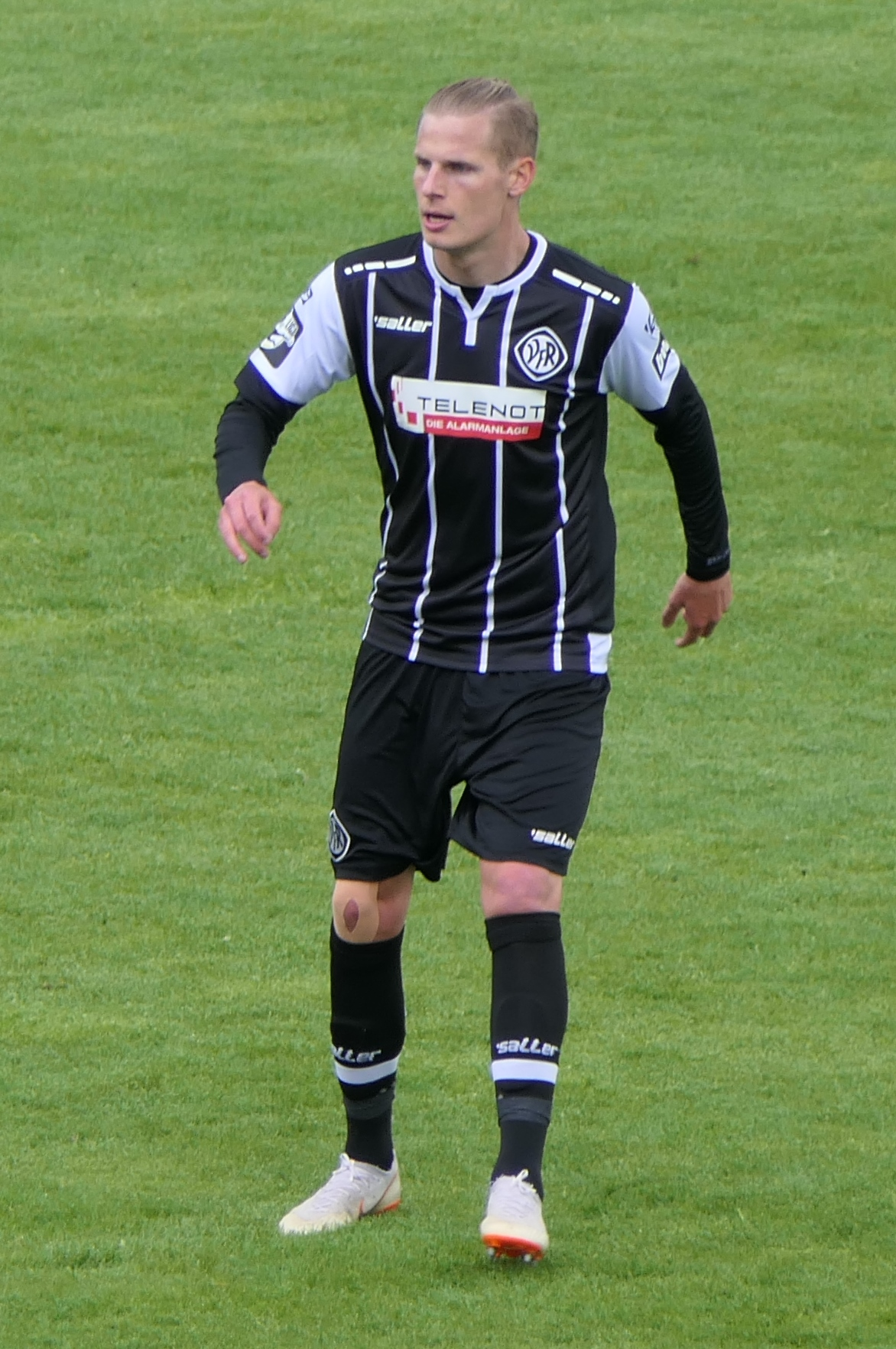

Personal information
- Date of birth: 13 October 1994 (age 32)
- Place of birth: Frankfurt, Germany
- Height: 1.83 m (6 ft 0 in)
- Position: Right back

Team information
- Current team: Türkgücü Friedberg
- Number: 17

Youth career
- 2009–2011: Eintracht Frankfurt
- 2011–2013: 1899 Hoffenheim

Senior career*
Years	Team	Apps	(Gls)
2013–2015	1899 Hoffenheim II	35	(2)
2013–2014	1899 Hoffenheim	1	(0)
2015	FSV Frankfurt	1	(0)
2015–2017	Mainz 05 II	36	(0)
2017–2019	VfR Aalen	57	(2)
2019–2020	Carl Zeiss Jena	8	(0)
2020–	Türkgücü Friedberg	11	(1)

International career
2011	Germany U18	3	(0)
2012–2013	Germany U19	2	(0)
2013–2014	Germany U20	2	(0)
- * Club domestic league appearances and goals as of 15 January 2021

Patrick Schorr (born 13 October 1994) is a German footballer who plays for Türkgücü Friedberg.

== Club career ==
Schorr made his professional debut with 1899 Hoffenheim in the Bundesliga against 1. FC Nürnberg in a 2–1 win.

On 6 June 2019, FC Carl Zeiss Jena announced that they had signed Schorr on a two-year contract.
