= Tim Paterok =

German footballer

Personal information
- Date of birth: 5 August 1992 (age 34)
- Place of birth: Paderborn, Germany
- Height: 1.92 m (6 ft 4 in)
- Position: Goalkeeper

Team information
- Current team: SV Rödinghausen
- Number: 1

Youth career
- Grün-Weiß Paderborn
- –2010: SC Paderborn
- 2010–2011: 1899 Hoffenheim

Senior career*
Years	Team	Apps	(Gls)
2011–2013	1899 Hoffenheim II	23	(0)
2014–2016	Wormatia Worms	62	(0)
2016–2017	SV Rödinghausen	21	(0)
2017–2018	VfL Osnabrück	3	(0)
2018–2021	TSV Steinbach	52	(0)
2021–2022	VfR Aalen	26	(0)
2022–2026	1. FC Saarbrücken	17	(0)
2026–	SV Rödinghausen	7	(0)
- * Club domestic league appearances and goals as of 23 September 2026

Tim Paterok (born 5 August 1992) is a German footballer who plays as a goalkeeper for Regionalliga West club SV Rödinghausen.
