= Robin Szarka =

German footballer

Personal information
- Full name: Robin Szarka
- Date of birth: 17 September 1991 (age 35)
- Place of birth: Mannheim, Germany
- Height: 1.76 m (5 ft 9 in)
- Position: Left back

Team information
- Current team: 1899 Hoffenheim II
- Number: 23

Youth career
- –2007: VfL Neckarau
- 2007–2008: 1899 Hoffenheim

Senior career*
Years	Team	Apps	(Gls)
2010–2014	1899 Hoffenheim II	103	(8)
2013–2014	1899 Hoffenheim	3	(0)
2014–2016	Energie Cottbus	71	(0)
2016–	1899 Hoffenheim II	126	(10)
- * Club domestic league appearances and goals as of 21 January 2021

Robin Szarka is a German footballer who plays as a left back for 1899 Hoffenheim II.
