= Andreas Ludwig =

German footballer

Personal information
- Date of birth: 11 September 1990 (age 36)
- Place of birth: Ulm, West Germany
- Height: 1.72 m (5 ft 8 in)
- Position: Winger

Youth career
- TSV Blaustein
- TSV Neu-Ulm
- 2004–2008: SSV Ulm

Senior career*
Years	Team	Apps	(Gls)
2009	SSV Ulm	16	(4)
2009–2013	1899 Hoffenheim II	86	(30)
2009–2014	TSG Hoffenheim	6	(0)
2011	→ 1. FC Heidenheim (loan)	10	(0)
2014	→ 1860 Munich (loan)	10	(1)
2014–2015	VfR Aalen	29	(3)
2015–2017	FC Utrecht	43	(4)
2017	Jong FC Utrecht	2	(0)
2017–2018	1. FC Magdeburg	10	(1)
2018–2022	1899 Hoffenheim II	81	(15)
2022–2025	SSV Ulm	56	(3)
- * Club domestic league appearances and goals as of 24 May 2025

Andreas Ludwig (born 11 September 1990) is a German professional footballer who plays as a winger.

In January 2014, Ludwig went out on loan to 2. Bundesliga side 1860 Munich.
