= 2013–14 FC Bayern Munich season =

115th season in existence of Bayern Munich

Bayern Munich
2013–14 season
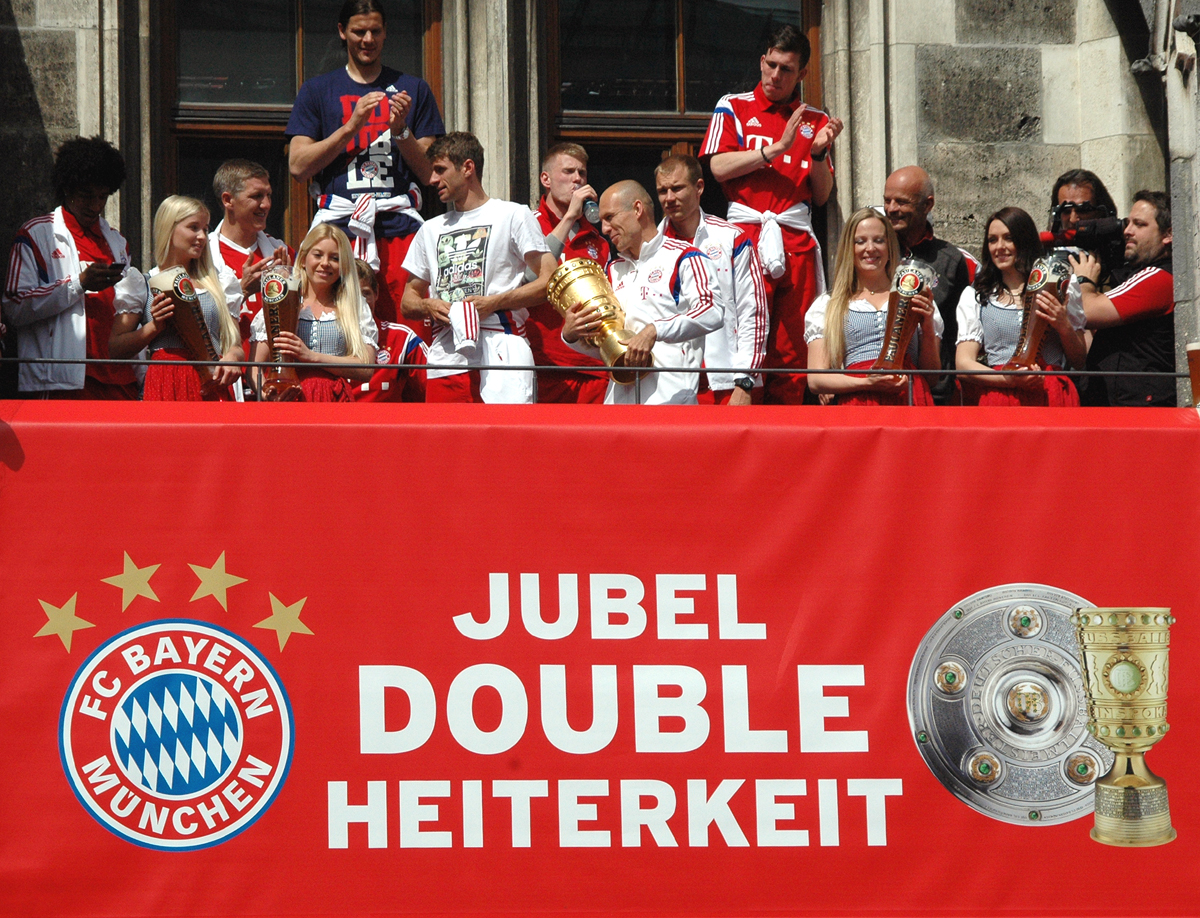
- Bayern Munich players celebrating their successful double-winning season
- President: Uli Hoeneß (until 14 March); Karl Hopfner (acting, from 14 March)
- Sporting director: Matthias Sammer
- Head coach: Pep Guardiola
- Stadium: Allianz Arena
- Bundesliga: 1st
- DFB-Pokal: Winners
- DFL-Supercup: Runners-up
- UEFA Champions League: Semi-finals
- UEFA Super Cup: Winners
- FIFA Club World Cup: Winners
- Top goalscorer: League: Mario Mandžukić (18); All: Mario Mandžukić (26)
| Home colours | Away colours | Third colours |

The 2013–14 FC Bayern Munich season was the 115th season in the club's history and the 49th consecutive season in the top flight of German football, the Bundesliga, since their promotion from the Regionalliga Süd in 1965. Bayern participated in this season's editions of the DFB-Pokal, DFL-Supercup, UEFA Champions League, UEFA Super Cup, and FIFA Club World Cup.

Pep Guardiola became the new head coach. Bayern signed Jan Kirchhoff, Mario Götze and Thiago. Mitchell Weiser returned from his loan spell. Anatoliy Tymoshchuk, Maximilian Riedmüller, Dale Jennings, Mario Gómez, Luiz Gustavo and Emre Can left Bayern. Nils Petersen made his loan spell permanent. Pre-season started on 26 June.

Bayern kicked off their Bundesliga on 9 August against Borussia Mönchengladbach with a 3–1 win and finished on 10 May with a 1–0 win against VfB Stuttgart. Bayern defeated Schwarz-Weiß Rehden 5–0 in the first round of DFB-Pokal. Bayern entered into Champions League in the group stage. They defeated CSKA Moscow 3–0 in their opening fixture in the competition on 17 September. They went to the FIFA Club World Cup in December claiming the title of Club World Champion after wins against Guangzhou Evergrande and Raja Casablanca. Bayern were also in the DFL-Supercup and UEFA Super Cup. They lost to Borussia Dortmund in the DFL-Supercup and defeated Chelsea in a shoot–out in the UEFA Super Cup, making 2013 the most successful year in club history by number of tournaments won (five).

== Background ==
=== Background information ===
Jan Kirchhoff, Mario Götze, and Thiago transferred to Bayern Munich and Mitchell Weiser returned to Bayern after finishing his loan with 1. FC Kaiserslautern. Jan Kirchhoff, Mario Götze, and Mitchell Weiser officially joined Bayern when the transfer window opened on 1 July. Thiago joined Bayern on 14 July. Nils Petersen, Anatoliy Tymoshchuk, Maximilian Riedmüller, Dale Jennings, Mario Gómez, Emre Can, and Luiz Gustavo all left the club. Nils Petersen made his loan spell permanent. He was on loan to Werder Bremen. Tymoshchuk's contract expired. Riedmüller was released. Dale Jennings, Mario Gómez, Emre Can, and Luiz Gustavo were all sold. Dale Jennings didn't make any first team appearances for Bayern. Pep Guardiola was hired as new head coach of Bayern, signing on 16 January 2013, and he took over on 26 June. Guardiola's contract runs until 30 June 2016. He kept Hermann Gerland as assistant coach, and Domenec Torrent was brought in as an assistant coach. Lorenzo Buenaventura was appointed as a fitness trainer, and Lars Kornetka was appointed to do game and video analysis and research reports. Peter Hermann left Bayern and became an assistant coach at Schalke 04. Bayern made two failed bids for Robert Lewandowski. Pre–season started on 26 June.

=== Transfers and contracts ===
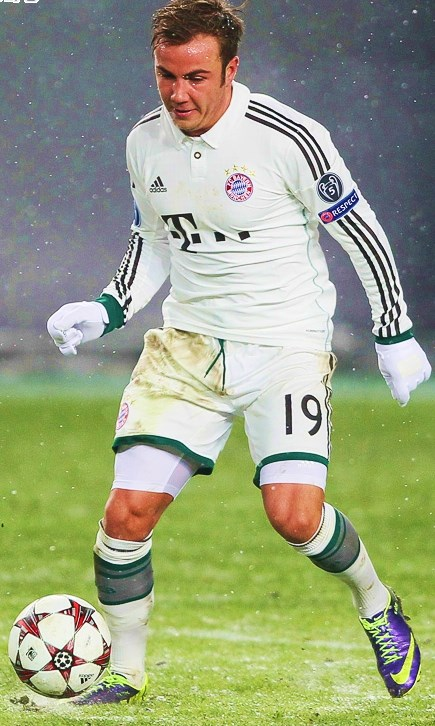
Mario Götze joined Bayern Munich before the start of the season

==== In ====
| No. | Pos. | Name | Age | EU | Moving from | Type | Transfer Window | Contract ends | Fee | Ref. |
|---|---|---|---|---|---|---|---|---|---|---|
| 15 | DF | Jan Kirchhoff | 22 | Yes | Mainz 05 | End of contract | Summer | 2016 | Free | |
| 19 | MF | Mario Götze | 21 | Yes | Borussia Dortmund | Transfer | Summer | 2017 | €37M | |
| 23 | MF | Mitchell Weiser | 19 | Yes | 1. FC Kaiserslautern | Loan return | Summer | — | — | |
| 6 | MF | Thiago | 22 | Yes | Barcelona | Transfer | Summer | 2017 | €25M | |
| 36 | MF | Alessandro Schöpf | 19 | Yes | Reserve team | Promoted | During season | 2016 | — | |
| 37 | MF | Julian Green | 18 | Yes | Reserve team | Promoted | During season | 2017 | — | |
| 38 | DF | Ylli Sallahi | 19 | Yes | Reserve team | Promoted | During season | — | — | |

==== Out ====
| No. | Pos. | Name | Age | EU | Moving to | Type | Transfer Window | Fee | Ref. |
|---|---|---|---|---|---|---|---|---|---|
| — | FW | Nils Petersen | 25 | Yes | Werder Bremen | Transfer | Summer | €3M | |
| 44 | MF | Anatoliy Tymoshchuk | 34 | No | Zenit Saint Petersburg | End of contract | Summer | Free | |
| 24 | GK | Maximilian Riedmüller | 25 | Yes | Holstein Kiel | Released | Summer | Free | |
| — | MF | Dale Jennings | 20 | Yes | Barnsley | Transfer | Summer | | |
| 33 | FW | Mario Gómez | 28 | Yes | Fiorentina | Transfer | Summer | €20M | |
| 36 | MF | Emre Can | 19 | Yes | Bayer Leverkusen | Transfer | Summer | undisclosed | |
| 30 | MF | Luiz Gustavo | 26 | No | VfL Wolfsburg | Transfer | Summer | undisclosed | |
| 15 | DF | Jan Kirchhoff | 23 | Yes | Schalke 04 | Loan | Winter | undisclosed | |

==== Contracts ====
| No. | Player | Status | Contract length | Expiry date | Other notes | Ref. |
|---|---|---|---|---|---|---|
| 15 | Jan Kirchhoff | Signed | Three years | 2016 | | |
| 19 | Mario Götze | Signed | Four years | 2017 | | |
| 6 | Thiago | Signed | Four years | 2017 | | |
| 36 | Alessandro Schöpf | Signed | Three years | 2016 | | |
| 37 | Julian Green | Signed | Four years | 2017 | | |
| 27 | David Alaba | Extended | Five years | 2018 | | |
| 17 | Jérôme Boateng | Extended | Five years | 2018 | | |
| 13 | Rafinha | Extended | Four years | 2017 | | |
| 9 | Robert Lewandowski | Transfer | Five years | 30 June 2019 | Signed for 2014–15 season | |
| 10 | Arjen Robben | Extended | Two years | 2017 | | |
| 4 | Dante | Extended | One year | 2017 | | |
| 20 | Sebastian Rode | Transfer | Four years | 30 June 2018 | | |
| 1 | Manuel Neuer | Extended | Five years | 2019 | | |
| 14 | Claudio Pizarro | Extension | One year | 30 June 2015 | | |
| 21 | Philipp Lahm | Extension | Four years | 30 June 2018 | Lahm announced that this would be his final contract. | |
| 25 | Thomas Müller | Extension | Five years | 30 June 2019 | | |

== Bundesliga ==
=== Review ===
==== August ====
Bayern faced Borussia Mönchengladbach on 9 August in the first round of play in the Bundesliga. Bayern won 3–1. Arjen Robben, Mario Mandžukić and David Alaba scored for Bayern. Dante scored an own goal to put Borussia Mönchengladbach on the board. The first matchday finished with Bayern tied with Bayer Leverkusen for third place in the league table. Bayern faced Eintracht Frankfurt on matchday two on 17 August. Bayern won 1–0 from a Mario Mandžukić goal. Thiago made his Bundesliga debut. After the second matchday was completed, Bayern were again tied with Bayer Leverkusen and had moved up to second place in the table. Bayern's matchday three opponent was 1. FC Nürnberg on 24 August. Nürnberg used "massive defending" tactics in the match. Josip Drmić and Daniel Ginczek were the main attacking players for Nürnberg. Bayern ended up getting goals from Franck Ribéry and Arjen Robben in the second half, and the result was a 2–0 victory. Despite the win, Bayern dropped to third place. Thiago picked up an injury during the match. On matchday four, Bayern faced SC Freiburg, which ended in a 1–1 draw. Xherdan Shaqiri gave Bayern a 1–0 in the 33rd minute. Nicolas Höfler scored in the 86th minute to equalize for Freiburg. Bayern moved up to second place. Bastian Schweinsteiger sprained his ankle in the match.

==== September ====
The next match was matchday 5 against Hannover 96 on 14 September, which Bayern won 2–0. Mario Mandžukić and Franck Ribéry scored for Bayern. Schweinsteiger made a "brief comeback" against CSKA Moscow. Schweinsteiger ended up starting the match on 21 September and was substituted in the 78th minute. Bayern defeated Schalke 04 4–0 on matchday six with goals from Schweinsteiger, Mario Mandžukić, Franck Ribéry, and Claudio Pizarro. Pep Guardiola considered this match "our best Bundesliga performance of the season so far." After the match and with Borussia Dortmund's 1–1 draw against 1. FC Nürnberg, Bayern and Borussia Dortmund were equal with 16 points each, but Bayern remained second due to an inferior tiebreaking situation. Bayern faced VfL Wolfsburg on matchday seven on 28 September. and won 1–0 with a goal from Thomas Müller. Bayern ended September in second place in the Bundesliga table

==== October ====
Bayern faced Bayer Leverkusen on matchday eight on 5 October. The match ended in a 1–1 draw. Toni Kroos scored for Bayern Munich and Sidney Sam scored for Bayer Leverkusen. Bayern Munich finished the matchday in first place. Bayern faced 1. FSV Mainz 05 on 19 October. Bayern won 4–1. Arjen Robben, Thomas Müller, and Mario Mandžukić scored for Bayern. Thomas Müller scored two goals. Shawn Parker scored for Mainz. Bayern finished the matchday in first place. Bayern faced Hertha BSC on 26 October. Bayern won 3–2. Mario Mandžukić and Mario Götze scored for Bayern. Mario Mandžukić scored two goals. Adrián Ramos and Änis Ben-Hatira scored for Hertha BSC. Bayern finished the matchday in first place.

==== November–December ====
Bayern faced 1899 Hoffenheim on 2 November. Bayern won 2–1. Mario Mandžukić and Thomas Müller scored for Bayern and Niklas Süle scored for Hoffenheim. The win meant that Bayern equaled Hamburger SV's 30-year-old record of 36 consecutive matches without a loss. Bayern finished the matchday in first place. Bayern faced FC Augsburg on 9 November. Bayern won 3–0 with goals from Jérôme Boateng, Franck Ribéry, and Thomas Müller. With this win, Bayern are undefeated in 39 consecutive league matches. Bayern ended the matchday in first place. Bayern faced Borussia Dortmund on 23 November. Franck Ribéry was ruled out of the match. Bayern won 3–0 with goals from Mario Götze, Arjen Robben, and Thomas Müller. Bayern finished the matchday in first place. Bayern finished November against Eintracht Braunschweig on 30 November. Bayern won 2–0 with two goals from Arjen Robben. Bayern finished the matchday in first place. Bayern faced Werder Bremen on 7 December. Bayern won 7–0 with goals from Assani Lukimya-Mulongoti (own goal), Daniel Van Buyten, Franck Ribéry (2 goals), Mario Mandžukić, Thomas Müller, and Mario Götze. Bayern finished the matchday in first place.

==== January–February ====
Bayern started the second half of the season with matchday 18 on 24 January against Borussia Mönchengladbach. Bayern were without Bastian Schweinsteiger for the match. There were issues with Franck Ribéry, Javi Martínez, Arjen Robben, and Philipp Lahm. Franck Ribéry had pain in the legs and Javi Martínez didn't practice the few days leading up to the match and Pep Guardiola "had already had little hope" of participating in the match and didn't get into the matchday squad. Arjen Robben was still not completely over his injury, however, he isn't likely to start the match. Arjen Robben didn't start the match and came into the match in the 79th minute. Philipp Lahm had a knee irritation but was likely to play in the match and he started the match. Mario Mandžukić was not in the matchday squad due to poor performances in training. Bayern won the match 2–0 with goals from Mario Götze and Thomas Müller. Bayern finished the matchday in first place. Bayern played VfB Stuttgart on matchday 17 on 29 January; 1 month and 7 days after the last match in matchday 17. The match was rearranged because of Bayern's participation in the 2013 FIFA Club World Cup. Mario Mandžukić was back in the squad; but wasn't in the starting line–up. Bayern won the match 2–1. Claudio Pizarro and Thiago scored for Bayern and Vedad Ibišević scored for Stuttgart. Vedad Ibišević gave Stuttgart a 1–0 in the 29th minute. Bayern were trailing in the 76th minute when Claudio Pizzaro equalized. Thiago scored in stoppage time to win the match. Bayern are now 13 points clear of second place and, with the win, has a 43–match undefeated streak. Bayern finished January in first place. Bayern faced Eintracht Frankfurt on matchday 19 on 2 February. Bayern won 5–0 with goals from Mario Götze, Franck Ribéry, Arjen Robben, Dante, and Mario Mandžukić. David Alaba was substituted off for the first time this season in the 75th minute. Thiago's 185 touches of the ball is a new league record. Bayern finished the matchday in first place. Bayern faced 1. FC Nürnberg on matchday 20 on 8 February. Bayern won 2–0 with goals from Mario Mandžukić and Philipp Lahm. This was Lahm's first goal in over three years for Bayern. Bayern finished the matchday in first place and are 13 points ahead of second place Bayer Leverkusen. Bayern faced SC Freiburg on matchday 21 on 15 February. Bayern won 4–0 with goals from Dante, Xherdan Shaqiri (2 goals), and Claudio Pizarro. Xherdan Shaqiri picked up an injury in the match. Bayern finished the matchday in first place. Bayern faced Hannover 96 on matchday 22 on 23 February. Bayern won 4–0 with goals from Thomas Müller (2 goals), Thiago, and Mario Mandžukić. The win was Bayern's 14th consecutive win and 47th consecutive match undefeated. Thomas Müller picked up a hamstring injury against Hannover and was out for five days before he could jog again. Bayern finished the matchday in first place and are 19 points ahead of Bayer Leverkusen.

==== March ====
Bayern faced Schalke 04 on matchday 23 on 1 March. Bayern won 5–1. Bayern scored four goals in the first 28 minutes. David Alaba, Arjen Robben (3 goals), and Mario Mandžukić scored for Bayern. Rafinha scored an own goal for Schalke. Schalke were sent down to ten men after Kyriakos Papadopoulos was sent off. Bayern's undefeated streak is up to 48 consecutive matches and have won their last 15 matches in the league. Bayern finished the matchday in first place. Bayern faced VfL Wolfsburg on matchday 24 on 8 March. Bayern won 6–1 and have won their last 16 league matches. Xherdan Shaqiri, Thomas Müller (2 goals), Mario Mandžukić (2 goals), and Franck Ribéry scored for Bayern and Naldo scored for Wolfsburg. Bayern scored five goals in a 17-minute period. Bayern finished the matchday in first place. Bayern faced Bayer Leverkusen on matchday 25 on 15 March. Bayern beat Bayer Leverkusen 2–1. Mario Mandžukić and Bastian Schweinsteiger scored for Bayern and Stefan Kießling scored for Bayer Leverkusen. The win mean Bayern's undefeated streak is at 50 consecutive match. Bayern finished the matchday in first place and has a 23-point lead over Borussia Dortmund. Bayern faced 1. FSV Mainz 05 on matchday 26 on 22 March. Bayern won 2–0 with goals from Bastian Schweinsteiger and Mario Götze. Bayern have scored at least two goals in their last 18 league matches, a league record. Bayern finished the matchday in first place. Bayern faced Hertha BSC on matchday 27 on 25 March. Bayern won the match 3–1. Toni Kroos, Mario Götze, and Franck Ribéry scored for Bayern. Adrián Ramos scored from a penalty kick for Hertha. Bayern won their 24th league championship. Bayern became the first club to clinch the Bundesliga championship in March and won the league with a "record seven games to spare." Bayern faced 1899 Hoffenheim on matchday 28 on 29 March. The match ended in a 3–3 draw. Claudio Pizzaro (2 goals) and Xherdan Shaqiri scored for Bayern and Anthony Modeste, Sejad Salihović, and Roberto Firmino scored for Hoffenheim. Hoffenheim ended Bayern's 19–match winning streak; but failed to end the 52–match undefeated streak. Thiago picked up an injury during the match and is out for two months.

==== April–May ====
Bayern started April with matchday 29 against FC Augsburg on 5 April. Augsburg won 1–0 with a goal from Sascha Mölders. Bayern lost for the first time in the league in 53 matches. Their last loss was against Bayer Leverkusen on 28 October 2012. This is the first victory against Bayern for FC Augsburg since the merger to form the club. The last time Augsburg won against Bayern was when BC Augsburg defeated them on 6 August 1961. Ylli Sallahi made his professional debut in the match. Xherdan Shaqiri picked up an injury during the match. Bayern faced Borussia Dortmund on matchday 30 on 12 April. Borussia Dortmund won 3–0 with goals from Henrikh Mkhitaryan, Marco Reus, and Jonas Hofmann. This is the first time that Bayern have lost two straight matches since November 2011. Rafinha was sent–off and eventually received a three–match ban. Manuel Neuer left the match with a calf injury. Bayern faced Eintracht Braunschweig on matchday 31 on 19 April. Bayern won 2–0 with goals from Claudio Pizzaro and Mario Mandžukić. This is Bayern's first victory in four matches. Bayern had only 14 first team players available for the match. Bayern faced Werder Bremen on matchday 32 on 26 April. Bayern won 5–2. Franck Ribéry, Claudio Pizarro (2 goals), Bastian Schweinsteiger, and Arjen Robben scored for Bayern. Theodor Gebre Selassie and Aaron Hunt scored for Werder Bremen. Bayern had a minute's silence before the match because of Tito Vilanova's death the day before.

Bayern faced Hamburger SV on 3 May. Bayern won the match 4–1. Mario Götze (2 goals), Thomas Müller and Claudio Pizzaro scored for Bayern and Hakan Çalhanoğlu scored for Hamburg. Jérôme Boateng was sent–off. Bayern faced VfB Stuttgart on matchday 34 on 10 May. Bayern won 1–0 with a goal from Claudio Pizzaro. Bastian Schweinsteiger picked up an injury during the match and was substituted in the first half.

=== Fixtures & results ===
==== Results by round ====
| Round | 1 | 2 | 3 | 4 | 5 | 6 | 7 | 8 | 9 | 10 | 11 | 12 | 13 | 14 | 15 | 16 | 17 | 18 | 19 | 20 | 21 | 22 | 23 | 24 | 25 | 26 | 27 | 28 | 29 | 30 | 31 | 32 | 33 | 34 |
|---|---|---|---|---|---|---|---|---|---|---|---|---|---|---|---|---|---|---|---|---|---|---|---|---|---|---|---|---|---|---|---|---|---|---|
| Ground | H | A | H | A | H | A | H | A | H | H | A | H | A | H | A | H | A | A | H | A | H | A | H | A | H | A | A | H | A | H | A | H | A | H |
| Result | W | W | W | D | W | W | W | D | W | W | W | W | W | W | W | W | W | W | W | W | W | W | W | W | W | W | W | D | L | L | W | W | W | W |
| Position | 3 | 2 | 3 | 2 | 2 | 2 | 2 | 1 | 1 | 1 | 1 | 1 | 1 | 1 | 1 | 1 | 1 | 1 | 1 | 1 | 1 | 1 | 1 | 1 | 1 | 1 | 1 | 1 | 1 | 1 | 1 | 1 | 1 | 1 |

Source: DFB
A = Away; H = Home; W = Win; D = Draw; L = Loss

Win Draw Loss Postponed

| Match | Date | Ground | Opponent | Score^{1} | Pos. | Pts. | GD | Report |
|---|---|---|---|---|---|---|---|---|
| 1 | 9 August | H | Borussia Mönchengladbach | 3 – 1 | 3 | 3 | 2 | Report / Report link; Kick off / 20:30 CEST; Attendance / 71,437; Referee / Tobias Welz; Bayern Munich / Borussia Mönchengladbach; Robben 12'; Mandžukić 16' (yellow card) 83'; Alaba 69' (pen.) / Dante 40' (o.g.); Kramer (yellow card) 41'; Stranzl (yellow card) 54'; Álvaro Domínguez (yellow card) 68' |
| 2 | 17 August | A | Eintracht Frankfurt | 1 – 0 | 2 | 6 | 3 | Report / Report link; Kick off / 15:30 CEST; Attendance / 51,500; Referee / Peter Gagelmann; Bayern Munich / Eintracht Frankfurt; Mandžukić 13'; Dante (yellow card) 55' / Aigner (yellow card) 90+2' |
| 3 | 24 August | H | 1. FC Nürnberg | 2 – 0 | 3 | 9 | 5 | Report / Report link; Kick off / 15:30 CEST; Attendance / 71,000; Referee / Christian Dingert; Bayern Munich / 1. FC Nürnberg; Mandžukić (yellow card) 45'; Lahm (yellow card) 47'; Ribéry 69' (yellow card) 70'; Robben 78' / Ginczek (yellow card) 27' |
| 4 | 27 August | A | SC Freiburg | 1 – 1 | 2 | 10 | 5 | Report / Report link; Kick off / 18:30 CEST; Attendance / 24,000; Referee / Florian Meyer; Bayern Munich / SC Freiburg; Shaqiri 33'; Van Buyten (yellow card) 70' / Höfler (yellow card) 63' (goal) 86'; Günter (yellow card) 66' |
| 5 | 14 September | H | Hannover 96 | 2 – 0 | 2 | 13 | 7 | Report / Report link; Kick off / 15:30 CEST; Attendance / 71,000; Referee / Tobias Stieler; Bayern Munich / Hannover 96; Ribéry (yellow card) 26' (goal) 64'; Kroos (yellow card) 32'; Boateng (yellow card) 47'; Mandžukić 51' / Marcelo (yellow card) 33'; Prib (yellow card) 51'; Bittencourt (yellow card) 77' |
| 6 | 21 September | A | Schalke 04 | 4 – 0 | 2 | 16 | 11 | Report / Report link; Kick off / 18:30 CEST; Attendance / 61,973; Referee / Manuel Gräfe; Bayern Munich / Schalke 04; Schweinsteiger 21'; Mandžukić 22'; Ribéry 75'; Pizarro 84' / Farfán (yellow card) 62' |
| 7 | 28 September | H | VfL Wolfsburg | 1 – 0 | 2 | 19 | 12 | Report / Report link; Kick off / 15:30 CEST; Attendance / 71,000; Referee / Bastian Dankert; Bayern Munich / VfL Wolfsburg; Schweinsteiger (yellow card) 26'; Müller 63'; Mandžukić (yellow card) 72' / Diego (yellow card) 27' |
| 8 | 5 October | A | Bayer Leverkusen | 1 – 1 | 1 | 20 | 12 | Report / Report link; Kick off / 18:30 CEST; Attendance / 30,210; Referee / Knut Kircher; Bayern Munich / Bayer Leverkusen; Kroos 29'; Boateng (yellow card) 67' / Sam 31'; Boenisch (yellow card) 52' |
| 9 | 19 October | H | Mainz 05 | 4 – 1 | 1 | 23 | 15 | Report / Report link; Kick off / 15:30 CEST; Attendance / 71,000; Referee / Thorsten Kinhöfer; Bayern Munich / FSV Mainz 05; Robben 50'; Müller 52', 82' (pen.); Mandžukić 69'; Kirchhoff (yellow card) 77' / Parker 44' |
| 10 | 26 October | H | Hertha BSC | 3 – 2 | 1 | 26 | 16 | Report / Report link; Kick off / 15:30 CEST; Attendance / 71,000; Referee / Michael Weiner; Bayern Munich / Hertha BSC; Boateng (yellow card) 28'; Mandžukić 30', 51'; Bastian Schweinsteiger (yellow card) 35'; Rafinha (yellow card) 50'; Götze 54' / Ramos 4' (yellow card) 52'; Hosogai (yellow card) 50'; Ben-Hatira 58'; Pekarík (yellow card) 65'; Skjelbred (yellow card) 90' |
| 11 | 2 November | A | 1899 Hoffenheim | 2 – 1 | 1 | 29 | 17 | Report / Report link; Kick off / 15:30 CET; Attendance / 30,150; Referee / Tobias Welz; Bayern Munich / 1899 Hoffenheim; Mandžukić 39'; Müller 75' / Süle 34'; Abraham (yellow card) 38'; Rudy (yellow card) 85' |
| 12 | 9 November | H | FC Augsburg | 3 – 0 | 1 | 32 | 20 | Report / Report link; Kick off / 15:30 CET; Attendance / 71,000; Referee / Peter Gagelmann; Bayern Munich / FC Augsburg; Boateng 4'; Ribéry 42'; Müller 90+5' (pen.) |
| 13 | 23 November | A | Borussia Dortmund | 3 – 0 | 1 | 35 | 23 | Report / Report link; Kick off / 18:30 CET; Attendance / 80,645; Referee / Manuel Gräfe; Bayern Munich / Borussia Dortmund; Boateng (yellow card) 36'; Rafinha (yellow card) 45'; Mandžukić (yellow card) 45'; Götze 66'; Robben 85'; Müller 87' / Großkreutz (yellow card) 45'; Mkhitaryan (yellow card) 56' |
| 14 | 30 November | H | Eintracht Braunschweig | 2 – 0 | 1 | 38 | 25 | Report / Report link; Kick off / 15:30 CET; Attendance / 71,000; Referee / Tobias Stieler; Bayern Munich / Eintracht Braunschweig; Robben 2', 30' |
| 15 | 7 December | A | Werder Bremen | 7 – 0 | 1 | 41 | 32 | Report / Report link; Kick off / 15:30 CET; Attendance / 42,100; Referee / Marco Fritz; Bayern Munich / Werder Bremen; Lukimya 21' (o.g.); Van Buyten 27' (yellow card) 66'; Boateng (yellow card) 32'; Ribéry 38', 82'; Mandžukić 60'; Müller 68'; Götze 90' / Caldirola (yellow card) 39'; Makiadi (yellow card) 45'; Di Santo (yellow card) 58' |
| 16 | 14 December | H | Hamburger SV | 3 – 1 | 1 | 44 | 34 | Report / Report link; Kick off / 15:30 CET; Attendance / 71,000; Referee / Tobias Welz; Bayern Munich / Hamburger SV; Mandžukić 42'; Götze 52'; Shaqiri 90+3' / van der Vaart (yellow card) 2'; Drobný (yellow card) 4'; Lasogga 87' |
| 18 | 24 January | A | Borussia Mönchengladbach | 2 – 0 | 1 | 47 | 36 | Report / Report link; Kick off / 20:30 CET; Attendance / 54,010; Referee / Peter Gagelmann; Bayern Munich / Borussia Mönchengladbach; Götze 7'; Müller 54' (pen.); Kroos (yellow card) 79' / Wendt (yellow card) 36'; Kramer (yellow card) 81' |
| 17 | 29 January | A | VfB Stuttgart | 2 – 1 | 1 | 50 | 37 | Report / Report link; Kick off / 20:00 CET; Attendance / 60,000; Referee / Manuel Gräfe; Bayern Munich / VfB Stuttgart; Kroos (yellow card) 50'; Dante (yellow card) 56'; Pizarro 76'; Boateng (yellow card) 83'; Thiago 90+3' / Leitner (yellow card) 22'; Ibišević 29'; Rüdiger (yellow card) 51'; Sakai (yellow card) 57'; Boka (yellow card) 75'; Harnik (yellow card) 83' |
| 19 | 2 February | H | Eintracht Frankfurt | 5 – 0 | 1 | 53 | 42 | Report / Report link; Kick off / 17:30 CET; Attendance / 71,000; Referee / Florian Meyer; Bayern Munich / Eintracht Frankfurt; Götze 12'; Ribéry 44'; Robben 67'; Dante 69'; Mandžukić 89' |
| 20 | 8 February | A | 1. FC Nürnberg | 2 – 0 | 1 | 56 | 44 | Report / Report link; Kick off / 15:30 CET; Attendance / 50,000; Referee / Tobias Welz; Bayern Munich / 1. FC Nürnberg; Mandžukić 18' (yellow card) 64'; Lahm (yellow card) 43' (goal) 49'; Müller (yellow card) 65' / Hloušek (yellow card) 45+1'; Pinola (yellow card) 50' |
| 21 | 15 February | H | SC Freiburg | 4 – 0 | 1 | 59 | 48 | Report / Report link; Kick off / 15:30 CET; Attendance / 71,000; Referee / Guido Winkmann; Bayern Munich / SC Freiburg; Dante 19' (yellow card) 85'; Shaqiri 34', 42'; Martínez (yellow card) 48'; Kroos (yellow card) 67'; Pizarro 88' / Günter (yellow card) 18' |
| 22 | 23 February | A | Hannover 96 | 4 – 0 | 1 | 62 | 52 | Report / Report link; Kick off / 17:30 CET; Attendance / 49,000; Referee / Knut Kircher; Bayern Munich / Hannover 96; Rafinha (yellow card) 23'; Müller 25', 59'; Thiago 34'; Mandžukić 66' / Diouf (yellow card) 21'; Huszti (yellow card) 27' |
| 23 | 1 March | H | Schalke 04 | 5 – 1 | 1 | 65 | 56 | Report / Report link; Kick off / 18:30 CET; Attendance / 71,000; Referee / Jochen Drees; Bayern Munich / Schalke 04; Alaba 3'; Robben 15', 28', 77' (pen.); Mandžukić 24'; Thiago (yellow card) 42' / Rafinha 64' (o.g.); Papadopoulos (red card) 76' |
| 24 | 8 March | A | VfL Wolfsburg | 6 – 1 | 1 | 68 | 61 | Report / Report link; Kick off / 15:30 CET; Attendance / 30,000; Referee / Tobias Welz; Bayern Munich / VfL Wolfsburg; Shaqiri 26'; Müller 63', 78'; Mandžukić 66', 80'; Ribéry 71' / Naldo 17'; Medojević (yellow card) 21' |
| 25 | 15 March | H | Bayer Leverkusen | 2 – 1 | 1 | 71 | 62 | Report / Report link; Kick off / 18:30 CET; Attendance / 71,000; Referee / Markus Schmidt; Bayern Munich / Bayer Leverkusen; Contento (yellow card) 28'; Mandžukić 44'; Schweinsteiger 52'; Rafinha (yellow card) 78' / Castro (yellow card) 57'; Spahić (yellow card) 81'; Bender (yellow card) 86'; Kießling 90+1' |
| 26 | 22 March | A | Mainz 05 | 2 – 0 | 1 | 74 | 64 | Report / Report link; Kick off / 15:30 CET; Attendance / 34,000; Referee / Tobias Stieler; Bayern Munich / FSV Mainz 05; Schweinsteiger 82'; Götze 86' / Moritz (yellow card) 85' |
| 27 | 25 March | A | Hertha BSC | 3 – 1 | 1 | 77 | 66 | Report / Report link; Kick off / 20:00 CET; Attendance / 76,197; Referee / Marco Fritz; Bayern Munich / Hertha BSC; Kroos 6'; Götze 14'; Ribéry 79' / Ramos 66' (pen.); Skjelbred (yellow card) 69' |
| 28 | 29 March | H | 1899 Hoffenheim | 3 – 3 | 1 | 78 | 66 | Report / Report link; Kick off / 15:30 CET; Attendance / 71,000; Referee / Christian Dingert; Bayern Munich / 1899 Hoffenheim; Pizarro 31', 40'; Shaqiri 34'; Schweinsteiger (yellow card) 80' / Modeste 23'; Salihović 44'; Vestergaard (yellow card) 48'; Firmino 75' (yellow card) 75' |
| 29 | 5 April | A | FC Augsburg | 0 – 1 | 1 | 78 | 65 | Report / Report link; Kick off / 15:30 CEST; Attendance / 30,660; Referee / Manuel Gräfe; Bayern Munich / FC Augsburg; Van Buyten (yellow card) 82'; Weiser (yellow card) 84' / Mölders 31'; Hong (yellow card) 59'; Ostrzolek (yellow card) 64'; Callsen-Bracker (yellow card) 85' |
| 30 | 12 April | H | Borussia Dortmund | 0 – 3 | 1 | 78 | 62 | Report / Report link; Kick off / 18:30 CEST; Attendance / 71,437; Referee / Felix Zwayer; Bayern Munich / Borussia Dortmund; Martínez (yellow card) 10'; Kroos (yellow card) 80'; Rafinha (red card) 90+1' / Mkhitaryan 20' (yellow card) 82'; Reus 49'; Hofmann 56' (yellow card) 59' |
| 31 | 19 April | A | Eintracht Braunschweig | 2 – 0 | 1 | 81 | 64 | Report / Report link; Kick off / 15:30 CEST; Attendance / 23,325; Referee / Daniel Siebert; Bayern Munich / Eintracht Braunschweig; Pizarro 75'; Mandžukić 86'; Schweinsteiger (yellow card) 89' / Hochscheidt (yellow card) 55'; Henn (yellow card) 77' |
| 32 | 26 April | H | Werder Bremen | 5 – 2 | 1 | 84 | 67 | Report / Report link; Kick off / 15:30 CEST; Attendance / 71,000; Referee / Guido Winkmann; Bayern Munich / Werder Bremen; Ribéry 20'; Müller (yellow card) 38'; Pizarro 53', 57'; Schweinsteiger 61'; Robben 74' / Selassie 10'; Hunt 36'; Caldirola (yellow card) 76' |
| 33 | 3 May | A | Hamburger SV | 4 – 1 | 1 | 87 | 70 | Report / Report link; Kick off / 15:30 CEST; Attendance / 57,000; Referee / Marco Fritz; Bayern Munich / Hamburger SV; Götze 33', 70'; Müller 55'; Pizarro 75'; Martínez (yellow card) 64'; Boateng (red card) 86' / Çalhanoğlu 72'; Demirbay (yellow card) 86' |
| 34 | 10 May | H | VfB Stuttgart | 1 – 0 | 1 | 90 | 71 | Report / Report link; Kick off / 15:30 CEST; Attendance / 71,437; Referee / Bastian Dankert; Bayern Munich / VfB Stuttgart; Kroos (yellow card) 22'; Dante (yellow card) 68'; Pizarro 90+2' / Boka (yellow card) 21'; Didavi (yellow card) 75' |

^{1}Bayern Munich goals come first.
Ground's country's flag and opponent's country's flag shown when from a different country of Bayern Munich.
Pos. = Position in league, Pts. = Points, GD = Goal difference, Ground: H = Home, A = Away, N = Neutral, HR = Home replacement, AR = Away replacement.

=== League table ===
| Pos | Team | Pld | W | D | L | GF | GA | GD | Pts | Qualification or relegation |
|---|---|---|---|---|---|---|---|---|---|---|
| 1 | Bayern Munich (C) | 34 | 29 | 3 | 2 | 94 | 23 | +71 | 90 | Qualification for the Champions League group stage |
| 2 | Borussia Dortmund | 34 | 22 | 5 | 7 | 80 | 38 | +42 | 71 | Qualification for the Champions League group stage |
| 3 | Schalke 04 | 34 | 19 | 7 | 8 | 63 | 43 | +20 | 64 | Qualification for the Champions League group stage |
| 4 | Bayer Leverkusen | 34 | 19 | 4 | 11 | 60 | 41 | +19 | 61 | Qualification for the Champions League play-off round |
| 5 | VfL Wolfsburg | 34 | 18 | 6 | 10 | 63 | 50 | +13 | 60 | Qualification for the Europa League group stage (Note: The 2013–14 DFB-Pokal finalists (Borussia Dortmund and Bayern Munich) qualified for the UEFA Champions League, thus the three Europa League places were distributed through league positions.) |

Source: DFB
Rules for classification: 1) points; 2) goal difference; 3) number of goals scored.
(C) Champions

=== Results summary ===
| Overall | | | | | | | | Home | | | | | | Away | | | | | |
| Pld | W | D | L | GF | GA | GD | Pts | W | D | L | GF | GA | GD | W | D | L | GF | GA | GD |
|---|---|---|---|---|---|---|---|---|---|---|---|---|---|---|---|---|---|---|---|
| 34 | 29 | 3 | 2 | 94 | 23 | +71 | 90 | 15 | 1 | 1 | 48 | 15 | +33 | 14 | 2 | 1 | 46 | 8 | +38 |

Last updated: 10 May 2014.

=== Records broken ===
| Record | | Previous record | | | New record | Ref. |
| Record | | Previous record | Season | Record holder | New record | Ref. |
|---|---|---|---|---|---|---|
| Title | Number of titles won: | 23 | 2012–13 | Bayern Munich | 24 | |
| Title | Number of matches remaining when title was won: | 6 | 2012–13 | Bayern Munich | 7 | |
| Title | Fastest matchday to clinch Bundesliga title: | Matchday 28 | 2012–13 | Bayern Munich | Matchday 27 | |
| Title | Earliest date to clinch Bundesliga title: | 6 April | 2012–13 | Bayern Munich | 25 March | |
| Points | Most points in a season opening half: | 44 | 2005–06 | Bayern Munich | 47 | |
| Wins & Losses | Most wins in a season: | 29 | 2012–13 | Bayern Munich | 29 (Tied) | |
| Wins & Losses | Most wins in a season opening half: | 14 | 2012–13 | Bayern Munich | 15 | |
| Wins & Losses | Most consecutive wins in a season: | 14 | 2012–13 | Bayern Munich | 19 | |
| Wins & Losses | Most consecutive wins away in a season: | 9 | 2012–13 | Bayern Munich | 10 | |
| Wins & Losses | Undefeated streak: | 36 | 1982–1983 | Hamburger SV | 53 | |
| Goals | Highest number of scored goals in a season (away): | 43 | 2006–07 | Werder Bremen | 46 | |
| Goals | Lowest number of conceded goals in a closing half season (away): | 6 | 2012–13 | Bayern Munich | 4 | |
| Goals | Best goal difference in a season (away): | +35 | 2012–13 | Bayern Munich | +38 | |

* Ongoing record
Last updated: 12 April 2014

== DFB–Pokal ==
=== DFB–Pokal review ===
The draw for the first round of the DFB-Pokal took place on 15 June and were drawn against Schwarz-Weiß Rehden. The match took place on 5 August. Bayern won 5–0. Bayern's goalscorers were Xherdan Shaqiri, Thomas Müller (3 goals), and Arjen Robben. Bayern were drawn against Hannover 96 in the second round draw for the DFB-Pokal on 10 August. The match took place on 25 September. Mario Götze was available to return to for the first time since his injury but he wasn't selected for the matchday roster. Bayern won 4–1 on goals from Thomas Müller (2 goals) Claudio Pizarro, and Franck Ribéry. Didier Ya Konan scored for Hannover. Bayern were drawn against FC Augsburg for the round of 16 on 29 September. on 4 December. Bayern won 2–0 with goals from Arjen Robben and Thomas Müller. Marwin Hitz fouled Arjen Robben with his studs. Robben received a "deep cut to the knee joint" on the play. No penalty shot was awarded because Arjen Robben was ruled offside prior to the incident. Thomas Müller came on for Arjen Robben in the 16th minute. Arjen Robben has been ruled out for six weeks because of the injury. Marwin Hitz eventually apologized to Arjen Robben for the tackle. There still was visible marks where the deep cut was during the mid–season training camp. The draw for the quarter–finals of the DFB-Pokal took place on 8 December. Bayern were drawn Hamburger SV. The match took place on 12 February. Bastian Schweinsteiger returned from injury. Bayern won 5–0 with goals from Mario Mandžukić (3 goals), Dante, and Arjen Robben. The draw for the semi–finals took place immediately after the quarter–finals was completed and were drawn against 1. FC Kaiserslautern. The match took place on 16 April. Bayern won the match 5–1. Bastian Schweinsteiger, Toni Kroos, Thomas Müller, Mario Mandžukić, and Mario Götze scored for Bayern. Simon Zoller scored for Kaiserslautern. Borussia Dortmund won the other semi–final and faced Bayern in the final. The match took place on 17 May. Bayern won the match 2–0 with goals from Robben and Müller. This was the first 0–0 match (after 90 minutes) since the 1992 cup final. This was Bayern's 10th league–and–cup double. Philipp Lahm picked up an injury during the match. There was a dispute over a header by Mats Hummels. In the 64th minute, the ball had crossed the line before Dante cleared the ball. No goal was given. However, Hummels hit the header from an offside position. Bayern were without Mandžukić and Schweinsteiger. Neither player traveled with the team on 15 May. Schweinsteiger was out injured. He had been questionable for the match. Guardiola stated that Mandžukić was fit, but had decided not to include him in the squad. Guardiola was questioned over the absence of Mandžukić, but remained "tight–lipped" about it. Thiago missed the final because he "suffered a setback in his rehabilitation." David Alaba was also injured for the final.

=== DFB–Pokal fixtures & results ===
Win Draw Loss Postponed

| 5 August Round 1 | Schwarz-Weiß Rehden | 0–5 | Bayern Munich | Osnabrück |
| 20:30 CEST | Chaib (yellow card) 35'; Arend (yellow card) 82' | Report | Shaqiri 18' (yellow card) 48'; Müller 45', 59' (pen.), 64'; Mandžukić (yellow card) 66'; Robben 88' | Stadium: osnatel-Arena; Attendance: 16,600 (sell-out); Referee: Christian Bandurski |

| 25 September Round 2 | Bayern Munich | 4–1 | Hannover 96 | Munich |
| 20:30 CEST | Müller 17', 64'; Pizarro 27'; Ribéry 78'; Dante (yellow card) 81' | Report | Ya Konan (yellow card) 24' (goal) 37' | Stadium: Allianz Arena; Attendance: 66,000 (capacity); Referee: Jochen Drees |

| 4 December Round of 16 | FC Augsburg | 0–2 | Bayern Munich | Augsburg |
| 20:30 CET | Hitz (yellow card) 14'; Verhaegh (yellow card) 40'; Ostrzolek (yellow card) 75'; Baier (yellow card) 86' | Report | Robben 4'; Müller (yellow card) 72' (goal) 78' | Stadium: SGL arena Attendance: 30,660 (sell-out); Referee: Felix Zwayer |

| 12 February Quarter-finals | Hamburger SV | 0–5 | Bayern Munich | Hamburg |
| 20:30 CET | Lam (yellow card) 42'; Arslan (yellow card) 55'; Rincón (yellow card) 89' | Report | Mandžukić 22', 74', 76'; Dante 26'; Robben 54' | Stadium: Imtech Arena; Attendance: 57,000 (sell-out); Referee: Felix Zwayer |

| 16 April Semi-finals | Bayern Munich | 5–1 | 1. FC Kaiserslautern | Munich |
| 20:30 CEST | Schweinsteiger 24'; Kroos 32'; Müller 50' (pen.); Mandžukić 78'; Götze 90' | Report | Dick (yellow card) 56'; Zoller 60' | Stadium: Allianz Arena; Attendance: 71,000 (sell-out); Referee: Thorsten Kinhöfer |

| 17 May Final | Borussia Dortmund | 0–2 (a.e.t.) | Bayern Munich | Berlin |
| 20:00 CEST | | report | Toni Kroos (yellow card) 52'; Pierre-Emile Højbjerg (yellow card) 63'; Jérôme Boateng (yellow card) 67'; Robben 107' (yellow card) 117'; Daniel Van Buyten (yellow card) 115'; Müller 120+3' | Stadium: Olympic Stadium; Attendance: 76,197 (capacity); Referee: Florian Meyer |

== UEFA Champions League ==
=== Review ===
==== Group stage ====
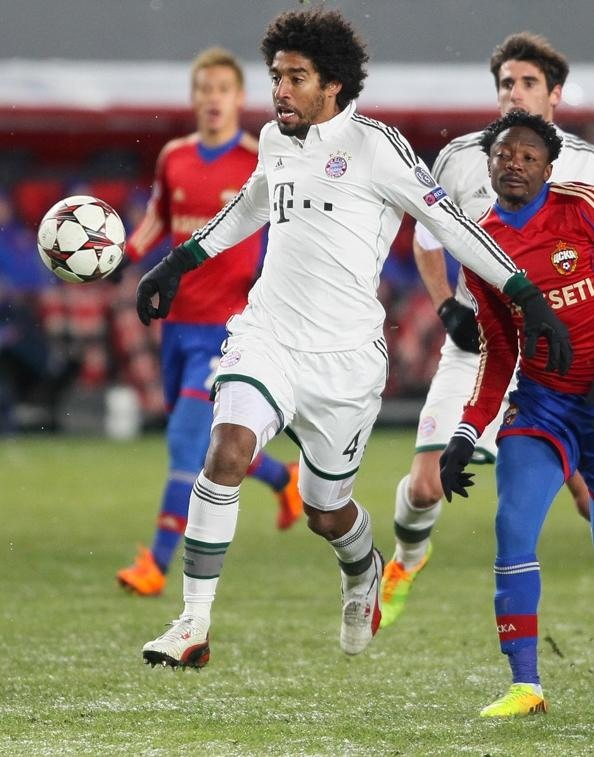
Dante playing against CSKA Moscow in November

Bayern were in the draw for the Champions League group stage on 29 August. They were drawn into Group D along with CSKA Moscow, Manchester City, and Viktoria Plzeň. Bayern face CSKA Moscow in Champions League on 17 September. Bayern won 3–0 with goals from David Alaba, Mario Mandžukić, and Arjen Robben. Manchester City also won 3–0 and were tied with Bayern for first place in Group D. Bastian Schweinsteiger made a "brief comeback" against CSKA Moscow. Schweinsteiger reported to kicker that "he is not up to making a full return this weekend." Bayern faced Manchester City on 2 October, winning 3–1. Franck Ribéry, Thomas Müller, and Arjen Robben scored for Bayern. Álvaro Negredo scored for Manchester City. Jérôme Boateng was sent–off late in the match. Bayern Munich finished matchday two in sole possession of first place in Group D. Bayern faced Viktoria Plzeň in Champions League on 23 October. Bayern won 5–0 with goals from Franck Ribéry, David Alaba, Bastian Schweinsteiger, and Mario Götze. Franck Ribéry scored two goals. Bastian Schweinsteiger's goal was the 6200 in the history of the Champions League. Bayern faced Viktoria Plzeň in Champions League on 5 November. Bayern won 1–0 with a goal from Mario Mandžukić. With the win, Bayern equaled Barcelona's record of nine consecutive wins in the competition. Bayern finished the matchday in first place. Bayern faced CSKA Moscow on 27 November. Bayern won 3–1. Arjen Robben, Mario Götze, and Thomas Müller scored for Bayern. Keisuke Honda scored from a penalty kick for CSKA Moscow. Julian Green made his first team debut in the match. The win means Bayern set a new record with 10 consecutive wins in Champions League. Bayern finished the matchday in first place. Bayern faced Manchester City on 10 December. Manchester City won 3–2. This was Bayern's first loss in 28 matches in all competitions. Thomas Müller and Mario Götze scored for Bayern. David Silva, Aleksandar Kolarov, and James Milner scored for Manchester City. The foul that led to the penalty kick was called "dubious" by kicker and a "controversial penalty" after "minimal contract" from Süddeutsche Zeitung. However, BBC stated that James Milner "won it" after being "tripped." Manchester City manager Manuel Pellegrini didn't realize that one more goal against Bayern would have put Manchester City ahead of Bayern.

==== Knockout phase ====
The draw for the 2013–14 knockout phase took place on 16 December. Bayern were drawn against Arsenal. The first leg took place on 19 February. Franck Ribéry and Xherdan Shaqiri were not available for the first leg. Bayern won 2–0 with goals from Toni Kroos and Thomas Müller. Yaya Sanogo was fouled by Jérôme Boateng in the seventh minute which led to Manuel Neuer saving a penalty shot from Mesut Özil. Arsenal goalkeeper Wojciech Szczęsny fouled Arjen Robben in the 37th minute. The foul led to a red card for Szczęsny and penalty shot. Arsenal reserve goalkeeper Łukasz Fabiański was substituted in for Santi Cazorla to replace Szczęsny in net. David Alaba took the penalty shot and hit the net. The second leg was played on 11 March. Bayern advanced to the quarter–finals after winning the tie 3–1 after the second leg ended in a 1–1 draw. Bastian Schweinsteiger gave Bayern the lead, however, Lukas Podolski equalized for Arsenal. Thomas Müller had a penalty shot saved in stoppage time in the second half. Arjen Robben drew the penalty that led to the penalty shot. Arsène Wenger stated that Robben was "a very good diver." Robben stated that Wenger shouldn't "start complaining about silly things" and believes that he drew two penalty shots. Mesut Özil touched the ball only 21 times and picked up a thigh injury during the second leg. Schweinsteiger's goal means that Bayern's 2–0 loss last season to Arsenal is the only match in their last 100 matches where they failed to score in a match. Arsenal had one less player on the bench due to a "red tape" situation. Arsenal brought Ryo Miyaichi to Allianz Arena for the second leg. However, Arsenal wanted to loan him out and took him off the UEFA roster list. UEFA told Arsenal on the matchday that he wasn't eligible to play. Dante was suspended for the match.

The draw for the quarter–finals took place on 21 March. The result was Bayern would face Manchester United. The first leg took place on 1 April. The match ended in a 1–1 draw. Bastian Schweinsteiger scored for Bayern and Nemanja Vidić scored for Manchester United. Bastian Schweinsteiger and Javi Martínez are suspended after Schweinsteiger picked up two yellow cards and the subsequent red card and Martínez picked up his third yellow card. There is some question over the sending–off of Schweinsteiger. Die Welt questioned whether it was a sending–off. The next day, Die Welt stated that Schweinsteiger "had indeed taken at his opponent Rooney, but also clearly played the ball." Pep Guardiola disagreed with the call stated that it was "unfair". Guardiola had used a hand gesture that Wayne Rooney had dive. David Moyes stated how he thought Schweinsteiger "trips Wayne up" and also stated that "It's a booking or at least a foul." The English press also favoured Rooney. Rooney denied diving the following day. The second leg was played on 9 April. Bayern won the match 3–1 and 4–2 on aggregate. Mario Mandžukić, Thomas Müller, and Arjen Robben scored for Bayern and Patrice Evra scored for Manchester United. Evra gave Manchester United the lead in the 57th minute with Bayern equalizing 69 seconds later with a goal from Mandžukić. In addition to missing Schweinsteiger and Martínez, Bayern was without Xherdan Shaqiri. Shaqiri picked up an injury against FC Augsburg. Wayne Rooney picked up a toe injury from the first leg of the tie and was rated as doubtful for the second leg. However, David Moyes stated that he would be "mad" not to play Rooney and started him. Rooney had taken an injection prior to the match.

The draw for the semi–final took place on 11 April. Bayern were drawn against Real Madrid. The first leg took place on 23 April. Real Madrid won 1–0 with a goal from Karim Benzema. Bayern had 15 corners and 705 passes compared to Real Madrid's three corners and 276 passes. Real Madrid had 20% possession in the first half and 37% in the second half. Pep Guardiola lost his first match at the Santiago Bernabéu Stadium. He was undefeated in his seven previous matches at the stadium. Guardiola was criticized for his tactics in the match. However, Guardiola defended his tactics. Arjen Robben stated that he "expected more" from Real Madrid. The return leg took place on 29 April. Real Madrid won the second leg 4–0 with two goals from Sergio Ramos and two goals from Cristiano Ronaldo. Ronaldo's goals set a new single–season record. His goals brought him to 16 goals in the current Champions League season. Lionel Messi had the previous record with 14 goals during the 2011–12 season. Real Madrid advanced to the Champions League final with a 5–0 aggregate win. This is the first time Real Madrid had won in Munich. They had nine losses and a draw prior to the win. Xabi Alonso picked up a yellow card in the match and was suspended for the final. Guardiola took the blame for the loss. However, Philipp Lahm insisted "it was a collective failure and not the fault of coach Guardiola."

=== Fixtures & results ===
Win Draw Loss Postponed

==== Group stage ====
===== Group D results =====
| Match | Date | Ground | Opponent | Score^{1} | Pos. | Pts. | GD | Report |
|---|---|---|---|---|---|---|---|---|
| 1 | 17 September | H | CSKA Moscow (Russia) | 3 – 0 | 1 | 3 | 3 | Report / Report link; Kick off / 20:45 CEST; Attendance / 68,000; Referee / Gianluca Rocchi (Italy); Bayern Munich / CSKA Moscow; Alaba 3'; Mandžukić 41'; Robben 68' |
| 2 | 2 October | A (England) | Manchester City (England) | 3 – 1 | 1 | 6 | 5 | Report / Report link; Kick off / 20:45 CEST; Attendance / 47,000; Referee / Björn Kuipers (Netherlands); Bayern Munich / Manchester City; Ribéry 7'; Kroos (yellow card) 45'; Müller 56'; Robben 59'; Boateng (red card) 86' / Agüero (yellow card) 42'; Nasri (yellow card) 69'; Milner (yellow card) 75'; Negredo 79' |
| 3 | 23 October | H | Viktoria Plzeň (Czech Republic) | 5 – 0 | 1 | 9 | 10 | Report / Report link; Kick off / 20:45 CEST; Attendance / 68,000; Referee / Alan Kelly (Ireland); Bayern Munich / Viktoria Plzeň; Ribéry 25' (pen.), 61'; Alaba 37'; Schweinsteiger 64'; Götze 90+1' / Hubník (yellow card) 24'; Limberský (yellow card) 48'; Kozáčik (yellow card) 86' |
| 4 | 5 November | A (Czech Republic) | Viktoria Plzeň (Czech Republic) | 1 – 0 | 1 | 12 | 11 | Report / Report link; Kick off / 20:45 CET; Attendance / 11,500; Referee / Antonio Mateu Lahoz (Spain); Bayern Munich / Viktoria Plzeň; Mandžukić 65' / Hubník (yellow card) 32'; Kolář (yellow card) 62'; Horváth (yellow card) 69' |
| 5 | 27 November | A (Russia) | CSKA Moscow (Russia) | 3 – 1 | 1 | 15 | 13 | Report / Report link; Kick off / 18:00 CET; Attendance / 14,000; Referee / Antony Gautier (France); Bayern Munich / CSKA Moscow; Robben 17'; Martínez (yellow card) 43'; Götze 56'; Dante (yellow card) 61'; Müller 65' (pen.); Thiago (yellow card) 77' / Honda 62' (pen.) |
| 6 | 10 December | H | Manchester City (England) | 2 – 3 | 1 | 15 | 12 | Report / Report link; Kick off / 20:45 CET; Attendance / 68,000; Referee / David Fernández Borbalán (Spain); Bayern Munich / Manchester City; Müller 5'; Götze 12'; Dante (yellow card) 40' / Silva 28'; Džeko (yellow card) 42'; Milner (yellow card) 44', (goal) 62'; Kolarov 59' (pen.); Fernandinho (yellow card) 78'; Zabaleta (yellow card) 83' |

Last updated: 18 January 2014
^{1}Bayern Munich goals come first.
Ground's country's flag and opponent's country's flag shown when from a different country of Bayern Munich.
Pos. = Position in league, Pts. = Points, GD = Goal difference, Ground: H = Home, A = Away, N = Neutral, HR = Home replacement, AR = Away replacement.

===== Group D table =====
| Pos | Team | Pld | W | D | L | GF | GA | GD | Pts | Qualification | BAY | MCI | PLZ | CSKA |
|---|---|---|---|---|---|---|---|---|---|---|---|---|---|---|
| 1 | (Germany) Bayern Munich | 6 | 5 | 0 | 1 | 17 | 5 | +12 | 15 (Note: Tied on head-to-head points (3). Head-to-head goal difference: Bayern Munich +1, Manchester City −1.) | Advance to knockout phase | — | 2–3 | 5–0 | 3–0 |
| 2 | (England) Manchester City | 6 | 5 | 0 | 1 | 18 | 10 | +8 | 15 | Advance to knockout phase | 1–3 | — | 4–2 | 5–2 |
| 3 | (Czech Republic) Viktoria Plzeň | 6 | 1 | 0 | 5 | 6 | 17 | −11 | 3 (Note: Tied on head-to-head points (3) and head-to-head goal difference (0). Head-to-head away goals: Viktoria Plzeň 2, CSKA Moscow 1.) | Transfer to Europa League | 0–1 | 0–3 | — | 2–1 |
| 4 | (Russia) CSKA Moscow | 6 | 1 | 0 | 5 | 8 | 17 | −9 | 3 | | 1–3 | 1–2 | 3–2 | — |

Source: UEFA

==== Knockout phase ====
===== Round of 16 =====
| 19 February First leg | Arsenal (England) | 0–2 | (Germany) Bayern Munich | London, England |
| 20:45 CET | Szczęsny (red card) 38'; Sanogo (yellow card) 55'; Rosický (yellow card) 86' | Report | Boateng (yellow card) 8'; Mandžukić (yellow card) 45'; Kroos 54'; Müller 88' | Stadium: Emirates Stadium; Attendance: 59,911; Referee: Nicola Rizzoli (Italy) |

| 11 March Second leg | Bayern Munich (Germany) | 1–1 (3–1 agg.) | (England) Arsenal | Munich, Germany |
| 20:45 CET | Dante (yellow card) 8'; Schweinsteiger 54'; Martínez (yellow card) 79' | Report | Podolski (yellow card) 26' (goal) 57'; Arteta (yellow card) 29'; Vermaelen (yellow card) 83' | Stadium: Allianz Arena; Attendance: 68,000; Referee: Svein Oddvar Moen (Norway) |

===== Quarter-finals =====
| 1 April First leg | Manchester United (England) | 1–1 | (Germany) Bayern Munich | Manchester, England |
| 20:45 CEST | Valencia (yellow card) 15'; Vidić 58' | Report | Schweinsteiger (yellow card) 61' (yellow-red card) 90' (goal) 67'; Mandžukić (yellow card) 82'; Martínez (yellow card) 89' | Stadium: Old Trafford; Attendance: 75,199; Referee: Carlos Velasco Carballo (Spain) |

| 9 April Second leg | Bayern Munich (Germany) | 3–1 (4–2 agg.) | (England) Manchester United | Munich, Germany |
| 20:45 CEST | Mandžukić 59'; Müller 68'; Rafinha (yellow card) 74'; Robben 76' | Report | Vidić (yellow card) 28'; Evra 57' (yellow card) 70' | Stadium: Allianz Arena; Attendance: 67,300; Referee: Jonas Eriksson (Sweden) |

===== Semi-finals =====
| 23 April First leg | Real Madrid (Spain) | 1–0 | (Germany) Bayern Munich | Madrid, Spain |
| 20:45 CEST | Benzema 19'; Isco (yellow card) 57' | Report | | Stadium: Estadio Santiago Bernabéu; Attendance: 79,283; Referee: Howard Webb (England) |

| 29 April Second leg | Bayern Munich (Germany) | 0–4 (0–5 agg.) | (Spain) Real Madrid | Munich, Germany |
| 20:45 CEST | Dante (yellow card) 17' | Report | Ramos 16', 20'; Alonso (yellow card) 38'; Ronaldo 34', 90' | Stadium: Allianz Arena; Attendance: 68,000; Referee: Pedro Proença (Portugal) |

== Other competitions ==
=== Review of other competitions ===
Bayern played in the DFL-Supercup against Borussia Dortmund on 27 July but lost the match 4–2. Marco Reus scored two goals for Borussia Dortmund. İlkay Gündoğan also scored for Dortmund. Daniel Van Buyten scored an own goal to put Dortmund up 2–1. Arjen Robben scored two goals for Bayern. Bayern also played UEFA Super Cup on 30 August against Chelsea. Bastian Schweinsteiger missed the UEFA Super Cup due to the injury. Tactics were "established early on: Bayern were patient and progressive with Chelsea content to defend deep and break swiftly." Fernando Torres gave Chelsea the lead in the eighth minute. Franck Ribéry equalized the score at 1–1. The match went into extra time. Chelsea "stormed" forward early in extra time and Eden Hazard scored in the 93rd minute to put Chelsea up 2–1. Bayern played from then on a "power play like hockey." Javi Martínez equalized one minute and 50 seconds into stoppage time in the second extra time period. The match went to a shoot–out which Bayern won 5–4. Romelu Lukaku failed to score on the last shot of the shoot–out. Javi Martínez, Mario Götze, and Arjen Robben picked up injuries during the match. Bayern also participated in the FIFA Club World Cup. Bayern were drawn against the winner of the match between the Asian Champions League champions and the African Champions League champions. Guangzhou Evergrande won the Asian Champions League and Al Ahly won the African Champions League. Guangzhou Evergrande advanced to the semi–final against Bayern on 17 December. Bayern won 3–0 with goals from Franck Ribéry, Mario Mandžukić, and Mario Götze. Bayern went on to play in the final of the FIFA Club World Cup against Raja Casablanca on 21 December. Bayern won 2–0 with goals from Dante and Thiago. This was the third time that Bayern won the World Championship. The first time was in 1976 and the second time was in 2001. The players left for a winter break after the match.

=== Results of other competitions ===
Win Draw Loss Postponed

| Rd | Date^{1} | Venue | Opponent | Result^{2} | Attendance | Goalscorers & carded players | | Ref. |
| Rd | Date^{1} | Venue | Opponent | Result^{2} | Attendance | Bayern Munich | Opponent | Ref. |
DFL-Supercup
| — | 27 July – 20:30 | A | Borussia Dortmund | 2–4 | 80,675 | Robben 54', 64'; Boateng (yellow card) 90' | Reus 6', 86'; Van Buyten 56' (o.g.); Gündoğan 57' | |
UEFA Super Cup
| — | 30 August – 20:45 | N | Chelsea | 2–2^{3} | 17,686 | Ribéry (yellow card) 23' (goal) 47'; Boateng (yellow card) 84'; Martinez 120' | Torres 8' (yellow card) 90'; Cahill (yellow card) 41'; Ramires (yellow card) 64' (yellow-red card) 85'; Luiz (yellow card) 66'; Hazard 93'; Lukaku (yellow card) 99'; Cole (yellow card) 118'; Ivanović (yellow card) 120' | |
FIFA Club World Cup
| SF | 17 December – 20:30 | N | Guangzhou Evergrande | 3–0 | 20,000 | Ribéry 40'; Mandžukić 44'; Götze 47' | Zhao (yellow card) 69' | |
| F | 21 December – 20:30 | N | Raja Casablanca | 2–0 | 37,774 | Dante 7'; Thiago 22' | Oulhaj (yellow card) 55'; Soulaimani (yellow card) 79' | |

== Other events ==
- Javi Martínez came back from international duty in August with a groin injury.
- Bastian Schweinsteiger returned to training on 11 September. He was injured in the match against SC Freiburg.
- Xherdan Shaqiri picked up an injury during international duty with Switzerland. It was initially expected that he would miss two weeks. But he has since been ruled out until December.
- Philipp Lahm, Thomas Müller, Manuel Neuer, Franck Ribéry, Arjen Robben, and Bastian Schweinsteiger are on the 23–player shortlist for the 2013 FIFA Ballon d'Or. Jupp Heynckes is up for the FIFA World Coach of the Year.
- It was determined that Bastian Schweinsteiger requires further surgery and is out for an indefinite period. He had surgery in June. He returned to training on 6 February and played in his first match back against Hamburger SV on 12 February in the DFB-Pokal.
- On 24 November, it was reported that Pep Guardiola "threatened" in a meeting with the team with "the expulsion of a potential mole" prior to the match against Borussia Dortmund. Bayern CEO Karl-Heinz Rummenigge stated that "The Bayern Munich 'mole' could be sold once tracked down."
- After two ACL injuries and four surgeries, Holger Badstuber finished his rehab stint in a rehab centre in Donaustauf and started rehab at Bayern's training centre. Holger Badstuber originally injured his ACL in a match against Borussia Dortmund on 1 December 2012 and then reinjured his ACL five months later. Holger Badstuber returned to first–team training on 9 February.
- During the winter break, Jan Kirchhoff joined Schalke 04 on loan to the end of next season.
- Bayern had a mid–season training camp in Doha, Qatar from 5 to 14 January.
- Franck Ribéry finished third in the 2013 FIFA Ballon d'Or voting.
- Bayern played in a friendly match against Red Bull Salzburg on 18 January; six days before they returned to competitive action. Bayern lost 3–0.
- On 6 February, Franck Ribéry had an operation. Ribéry "received a blow on the buttocks."

== Team record ==
| Competition | First match | Last match | Starting round | Final position | Record | | | | | | | | Ref. |
| Competition | First match | Last match | Starting round | Final position | G | W | D | L | GF | GA | GD | Win % | Ref. |
|---|---|---|---|---|---|---|---|---|---|---|---|---|---|
| Bundesliga | 9 August | 10 May | Matchday 1 | Winners | 34 | 29 | 3 | 2 | 94 | 23 | +71 | 85.29 | |
| DFB-Pokal | 5 August | 17 May | Round 1 | Winners | 6 | 6 | 0 | 0 | 23 | 2 | +21 | 100.00 | |
| DFL-Supercup | 27 July | | Final | Runners-up | 1 | 0 | 0 | 1 | 2 | 4 | −2 | 0.00 | |
| Champions League | 17 September | 29 April | Group stage | Semi-finals | 12 | 7 | 2 | 3 | 24 | 13 | +11 | 58.33 | |
| UEFA Super Cup | 30 August | | Final | Winners | 1 | 0 | 1 | 0 | 2 | 2 | +0 | 0.00 | |
| FIFA Club World Cup | 17 December | 21 December | Semi-finals | Winners | 2 | 2 | 0 | 0 | 5 | 0 | +5 | 100.00 | |
| Total | | | | | 56 | 44 | 6 | 6 | 150 | 44 | +106 | 78.57 | — |
Updated: 19 May 2014

== Player information ==
=== Squad statistics ===
==== Squad, appearances and goals ====
| No. | Player | Total | | | | Bundesliga | | | | DFB-Pokal | | | | DFL-Supercup | | | | Champions League | | | | UEFA Super Cup | | | | FIFA Club World Cup | | | |
| No. | Player | TA | ST | SB | G | TA | ST | SB | G | TA | ST | SB | G | TA | ST | SB | G | TA | ST | SB | G | TA | ST | SB | G | TA | ST | SB | G |
Goalkeepers
| 1 | Manuel Neuer | 51 | 51 | 0 | 0 | 31 | 31 | 0 | 0 | 5 | 5 | 0 | 0 | 0 | 0 | 0 | 0 | 12 | 12 | 0 | 0 | 1 | 1 | 0 | 0 | 2 | 2 | 0 | 0 |
| 22 | Tom Starke | 3 | 3 | 0 | 0 | 2 | 2 | 0 | 0 | 0 | 0 | 0 | 0 | 1 | 1 | 0 | 0 | 0 | 0 | 0 | 0 | 0 | 0 | 0 | 0 | 0 | 0 | 0 | 0 |
| 32 | Lukas Raeder | 3 | 2 | 1 | 0 | 2 | 1 | 1 | 0 | 1 | 1 | 0 | 0 | 0 | 0 | 0 | 0 | 0 | 0 | 0 | 0 | 0 | 0 | 0 | 0 | 0 | 0 | 0 | 0 |
Defenders
| 4 | Dante | 46 | 43 | 3 | 4 | 29 | 27 | 2 | 2 | 5 | 5 | 0 | 1 | 1 | 0 | 1 | 0 | 9 | 9 | 0 | 0 | 1 | 1 | 0 | 0 | 1 | 1 | 0 | 1 |
| 5 | Daniel Van Buyten | 18 | 16 | 2 | 1 | 12 | 10 | 2 | 1 | 2 | 2 | 0 | 0 | 1 | 1 | 0 | 0 | 2 | 2 | 0 | 0 | 0 | 0 | 0 | 0 | 1 | 1 | 0 | 0 |
| 13 | Rafinha | 45 | 39 | 6 | 0 | 28 | 25 | 3 | 0 | 5 | 4 | 1 | 0 | 0 | 0 | 0 | 0 | 9 | 7 | 2 | 0 | 1 | 1 | 0 | 0 | 2 | 2 | 0 | 0 |
| 17 | Jérôme Boateng | 42 | 41 | 1 | 1 | 25 | 25 | 0 | 1 | 4 | 3 | 1 | 0 | 1 | 1 | 0 | 0 | 9 | 9 | 0 | 0 | 1 | 1 | 0 | 0 | 2 | 2 | 0 | 0 |
| 21 | Philipp Lahm (C) | 47 | 44 | 3 | 1 | 28 | 25 | 3 | 1 | 3 | 3 | 0 | 0 | 1 | 1 | 0 | 0 | 12 | 12 | 0 | 0 | 1 | 1 | 0 | 0 | 2 | 2 | 0 | 0 |
| 26 | Diego Contento | 13 | 9 | 4 | 0 | 10 | 6 | 4 | 0 | 1 | 1 | 0 | 0 | 0 | 0 | 0 | 0 | 2 | 2 | 0 | 0 | 0 | 0 | 0 | 0 | 0 | 0 | 0 | 0 |
| 27 | David Alaba | 49 | 46 | 3 | 4 | 28 | 26 | 2 | 2 | 5 | 4 | 1 | 0 | 1 | 1 | 0 | 0 | 12 | 12 | 0 | 2 | 1 | 1 | 0 | 0 | 2 | 2 | 0 | 0 |
| 28 | Holger Badstuber | 0 | 0 | 0 | 0 | 0 | 0 | 0 | 0 | 0 | 0 | 0 | 0 | 0 | 0 | 0 | 0 | 0 | 0 | 0 | 0 | 0 | 0 | 0 | 0 | 0 | 0 | 0 | 0 |
| 38 | Ylli Sallahi | 1 | 1 | 0 | 0 | 1 | 1 | 0 | 0 | 0 | 0 | 0 | 0 | 0 | 0 | 0 | 0 | 0 | 0 | 0 | 0 | 0 | 0 | 0 | 0 | 0 | 0 | 0 | 0 |
Midfielders
| 6 | Thiago | 25 | 19 | 6 | 3 | 16 | 11 | 5 | 2 | 2 | 2 | 0 | 0 | 1 | 1 | 0 | 0 | 4 | 3 | 1 | 0 | 0 | 0 | 0 | 0 | 2 | 2 | 0 | 1 |
| 7 | Franck Ribéry | 38 | 32 | 6 | 16 | 22 | 18 | 4 | 10 | 3 | 1 | 2 | 1 | 0 | 0 | 0 | 0 | 10 | 10 | 0 | 3 | 1 | 1 | 0 | 1 | 2 | 2 | 0 | 1 |
| 8 | Javi Martínez | 33 | 19 | 14 | 1 | 18 | 14 | 4 | 0 | 4 | 1 | 3 | 0 | 0 | 0 | 0 | 0 | 8 | 4 | 4 | 0 | 1 | 0 | 1 | 1 | 2 | 0 | 2 | 0 |
| 10 | Arjen Robben | 44 | 36 | 8 | 20 | 28 | 20 | 8 | 11 | 4 | 4 | 0 | 3 | 1 | 1 | 0 | 2 | 10 | 10 | 0 | 4 | 1 | 1 | 0 | 0 | 0 | 0 | 0 | 0 |
| 11 | Xherdan Shaqiri | 27 | 14 | 13 | 7 | 17 | 10 | 7 | 6 | 2 | 2 | 0 | 1 | 1 | 1 | 0 | 0 | 3 | 0 | 3 | 0 | 1 | 0 | 1 | 0 | 2 | 1 | 1 | 0 |
| 19 | Mario Götze | 44 | 27 | 17 | 15 | 27 | 20 | 7 | 10 | 3 | 2 | 1 | 1 | 0 | 0 | 0 | 0 | 11 | 6 | 5 | 3 | 1 | 0 | 1 | 0 | 2 | 1 | 1 | 1 |
| 23 | Mitchell Weiser | 4 | 2 | 2 | 0 | 3 | 2 | 1 | 0 | 0 | 0 | 0 | 0 | 0 | 0 | 0 | 0 | 1 | 0 | 1 | 0 | 0 | 0 | 0 | 0 | 0 | 0 | 0 | 0 |
| 25 | Thomas Müller | 50 | 39 | 11 | 25 | 31 | 25 | 6 | 13 | 4 | 3 | 1 | 7 | 1 | 1 | 0 | 0 | 12 | 8 | 4 | 5 | 1 | 1 | 0 | 0 | 1 | 1 | 0 | 0 |
| 31 | Bastian Schweinsteiger | 36 | 32 | 4 | 8 | 23 | 22 | 1 | 4 | 4 | 3 | 1 | 1 | 1 | 0 | 1 | 0 | 8 | 7 | 1 | 3 | 0 | 0 | 0 | 0 | 0 | 0 | 0 | 0 |
| 34 | Pierre-Emile Højbjerg | 8 | 2 | 6 | 0 | 7 | 2 | 5 | 0 | 1 | 0 | 1 | 0 | 0 | 0 | 0 | 0 | 0 | 0 | 0 | 0 | 0 | 0 | 0 | 0 | 0 | 0 | 0 | 0 |
| 39 | Toni Kroos | 50 | 44 | 6 | 4 | 29 | 24 | 5 | 2 | 5 | 5 | 0 | 1 | 1 | 1 | 0 | 0 | 12 | 11 | 1 | 1 | 1 | 1 | 0 | 0 | 2 | 2 | 0 | 0 |
Forwards
| 9 | Mario Mandžukić | 48 | 36 | 12 | 26 | 30 | 21 | 9 | 18 | 4 | 4 | 0 | 4 | 1 | 1 | 0 | 0 | 10 | 8 | 2 | 3 | 1 | 1 | 0 | 0 | 2 | 1 | 1 | 1 |
| 14 | Claudio Pizarro | 25 | 7 | 18 | 11 | 17 | 5 | 12 | 10 | 1 | 1 | 0 | 1 | 1 | 0 | 1 | 0 | 5 | 0 | 5 | 0 | 0 | 0 | 0 | 0 | 1 | 0 | 1 | 0 |
| 20 | Patrick Weihrauch | 0 | 0 | 0 | 0 | 0 | 0 | 0 | 0 | 0 | 0 | 0 | 0 | 0 | 0 | 0 | 0 | 0 | 0 | 0 | 0 | 0 | 0 | 0 | 0 | 0 | 0 | 0 | 0 |
| 37 | Julian Green | 1 | 0 | 1 | 0 | 0 | 0 | 0 | 0 | 0 | 0 | 0 | 0 | 0 | 0 | 0 | 0 | 1 | 0 | 1 | 0 | 0 | 0 | 0 | 0 | 0 | 0 | 0 | 0 |
Players who left after the start of the season.^{4}
| 36 | Emre Can | 0 | 0 | 0 | 0 | 0 | 0 | 0 | 0 | 0 | 0 | 0 | 0 | 0 | 0 | 0 | 0 | 0 | 0 | 0 | 0 | 0 | 0 | 0 | 0 | 0 | 0 | 0 | 0 |
| 30 | Luiz Gustavo | 0 | 0 | 0 | 0 | 0 | 0 | 0 | 0 | 0 | 0 | 0 | 0 | 0 | 0 | 0 | 0 | 0 | 0 | 0 | 0 | 0 | 0 | 0 | 0 | 0 | 0 | 0 | 0 |
| 15 | Jan Kirchhoff | 11 | 0 | 11 | 0 | 7 | 0 | 7 | 0 | 2 | 0 | 2 | 0 | 0 | 0 | 0 | 0 | 2 | 0 | 2 | 0 | 0 | 0 | 0 | 0 | 0 | 0 | 0 | 0 |
Sources DFB-Pokal: DFL-Supercup: UEFA Super Cup: FIFA Club World Cup:
Last updated: 19 May 2014

==== Clean sheets ====
| Goalkeeper | Date | Competition | Opponent | Score | Ref. |
|---|---|---|---|---|---|
| Manuel Neuer | 5 August | DFB-Pokal | Schwarz-Weiß Rehden | 5–0 | |
| Manuel Neuer | 17 August | Bundesliga | Eintracht Frankfurt | 1–0 | |
| Manuel Neuer | 24 August | Bundesliga | 1. FC Nürnberg | 2–0 | |
| Manuel Neuer | 14 September | Bundesliga | Hannover 96 | 2–0 | |
| Manuel Neuer | 17 September | Champions League | CSKA Moscow | 3–0 | |
| Manuel Neuer | 21 September | Bundesliga | Schalke 04 | 4–0 | |
| Manuel Neuer | 28 September | Bundesliga | VfL Wolfsburg | 1–0 | |
| Manuel Neuer | 23 October | Champions League | Viktoria Plzeň | 5–0 | |
| Manuel Neuer | 5 November | Champions League | Viktoria Plzeň | 1–0 | |
| Manuel Neuer | 9 November | Bundesliga | FC Augsburg | 3–0 | |
| Manuel Neuer | 23 November | Bundesliga | Borussia Dortmund | 3–0 | |
| Manuel Neuer | 30 November | Bundesliga | Eintracht Braunschweig | 2–0 | |
| Manuel Neuer | 4 December | DFB–Pokal | FC Augsburg | 2–0 | |
| Manuel Neuer | 7 December | Bundesliga | Werder Bremen | 7–0 | |
| Manuel Neuer | 17 December | FIFA Club World Cup | Guangzhou Evergrande | 3–0 | |
| Manuel Neuer | 21 December | FIFA Club World Cup | Raja Casablanca | 2–0 | |
| Manuel Neuer | 24 January | Bundesliga | Borussia Mönchengladbach | 2–0 | |
| Manuel Neuer | 2 February | Bundesliga | Eintracht Frankfurt | 5–0 | |
| Manuel Neuer | 8 February | Bundesliga | 1. FC Nürnberg | 2–0 | |
| Manuel Neuer | 12 February | DFB–Pokal | Hamburger SV | 5–0 | |
| Manuel Neuer | 15 February | Bundesliga | SC Freiburg | 4–0 | |
| Manuel Neuer | 19 February | Champions League | Arsenal | 2–0 | |
| Tom Starke | 23 February | Bundesliga | Hannover 96 | 4–0 | |
| Manuel Neuer | 22 March | Bundesliga | Mainz 05 | 2–0 | |
| Lukas Raeder | 19 April | Bundesliga | Eintracht Braunschweig | 2–0 | |
| Manuel Neuer | 10 May | Bundesliga | VfB Stuttgart | 1–0 | |
| Manuel Neuer | 17 May | DFB–Pokal | Borussia Dortmund | 2–0 | |

==== Multi–goal matches ====
| Goalscorer | Date | Competition | Opponent | Score | Ref. |
Two–goal matches
| Arjen Robben | 27 July | DFL-Supercup | Borussia Dortmund | 2–4 | |
| Thomas Müller | 25 September | DFB-Pokal | Hannover 96 | 4–1 | |
| Thomas Müller | 19 October | Bundesliga | Mainz 05 | 4–1 | |
| Franck Ribéry | 23 October | Champions League | Viktoria Plzeň | 5–0 | |
| Mario Mandžukić | 26 October | Bundesliga | Hertha BSC | 3–2 | |
| Arjen Robben | 30 November | Bundesliga | Eintracht Braunschweig | 2–0 | |
| Franck Ribéry | 7 December | Bundesliga | Werder Bremen | 7–0 | |
| Xherdan Shaqiri | 15 February | Bundesliga | SC Freiburg | 4–0 | |
| Thomas Müller | 23 February | Bundesliga | Hannover 96 | 4–0 | |
| Mario Mandžukić | 8 March | Bundesliga | VfL Wolfsburg | 6–1 | |
| Thomas Müller | 8 March | Bundesliga | VfL Wolfsburg | 6–1 | |
| Claudio Pizarro | 29 March | Bundesliga | 1899 Hoffenheim | 3–3 | |
| Claudio Pizarro | 26 April | Bundesliga | Werder Bremen | 5–2 | |
| Mario Götze | 3 May | Bundesliga | Hamburger SV | 4–1 | |
Three–goal matches
| Thomas Müller | 5 August | DFB-Pokal | Schwarz-Weiß Rehden | 5–0 | |
| Mario Mandžukić | 12 February | DFB-Pokal | Hamburger SV | 5–0 | |
| Arjen Robben | 1 March | Bundesliga | Schalke 04 | 5–1 | |

=== Discipline ===
==== Bookings ====
| Player | Total | | | Bundesliga | | | DFB-Pokal | | | DFL-Supercup | | | Champions League | | | UEFA Super Cup | | | FIFA Club World Cup | | |
| Player | Yellow card | (yellow card) (red card) | Red card | Yellow card | (yellow card) (red card) | Red card | Yellow card | (yellow card) (red card) | Red card | Yellow card | (yellow card) (red card) | Red card | Yellow card | (yellow card) (red card) | Red card | Yellow card | (yellow card) (red card) | Red card | Yellow card | (yellow card) (red card) | Red card |
|---|---|---|---|---|---|---|---|---|---|---|---|---|---|---|---|---|---|---|---|---|---|
| Jérôme Boateng | 8 | 0 | 2 | 6 | 0 | 1 | 1 | 0 | 0 | 1 | 0 | 0 | 1 | 0 | 1 | 0 | 0 | 0 | 0 | 0 | 0 |
| Mario Mandžukić | 8 | 0 | 0 | 5 | 0 | 0 | 1 | 0 | 0 | 0 | 0 | 0 | 2 | 0 | 0 | 0 | 0 | 0 | 0 | 0 | 0 |
| Dante | 9 | 0 | 0 | 4 | 0 | 0 | 1 | 0 | 0 | 0 | 0 | 0 | 4 | 0 | 0 | 0 | 0 | 0 | 0 | 0 | 0 |
| Franck Ribéry | 3 | 0 | 0 | 2 | 0 | 0 | 0 | 0 | 0 | 0 | 0 | 0 | 0 | 0 | 0 | 1 | 0 | 0 | 0 | 0 | 0 |
| Toni Kroos | 8 | 0 | 0 | 6 | 0 | 0 | 1 | 0 | 0 | 0 | 0 | 0 | 1 | 0 | 0 | 0 | 0 | 0 | 0 | 0 | 0 |
| Bastian Schweinsteiger | 4 | 1 | 0 | 4 | 0 | 0 | 0 | 0 | 0 | 0 | 0 | 0 | 0 | 1 | 0 | 0 | 0 | 0 | 0 | 0 | 0 |
| Daniel Van Buyten | 4 | 0 | 0 | 3 | 0 | 0 | 1 | 0 | 0 | 0 | 0 | 0 | 0 | 0 | 0 | 0 | 0 | 0 | 0 | 0 | 0 |
| Rafinha | 5 | 0 | 1 | 4 | 0 | 1 | 0 | 0 | 0 | 0 | 0 | 0 | 1 | 0 | 0 | 0 | 0 | 0 | 0 | 0 | 0 |
| Xherdan Shaqiri | 1 | 0 | 0 | 0 | 0 | 0 | 1 | 0 | 0 | 0 | 0 | 0 | 0 | 0 | 0 | 0 | 0 | 0 | 0 | 0 | 0 |
| Philipp Lahm | 2 | 0 | 0 | 2 | 0 | 0 | 0 | 0 | 0 | 0 | 0 | 0 | 0 | 0 | 0 | 0 | 0 | 0 | 0 | 0 | 0 |
| Javi Martínez | 6 | 0 | 0 | 3 | 0 | 0 | 0 | 0 | 0 | 0 | 0 | 0 | 3 | 0 | 0 | 0 | 0 | 0 | 0 | 0 | 0 |
| Jan Kirchoff | 1 | 0 | 0 | 1 | 0 | 0 | 0 | 0 | 0 | 0 | 0 | 0 | 0 | 0 | 0 | 0 | 0 | 0 | 0 | 0 | 0 |
| Thiago | 2 | 0 | 0 | 1 | 0 | 0 | 0 | 0 | 0 | 0 | 0 | 0 | 1 | 0 | 0 | 0 | 0 | 0 | 0 | 0 | 0 |
| Thomas Müller | 3 | 0 | 0 | 2 | 0 | 0 | 1 | 0 | 0 | 0 | 0 | 0 | 0 | 0 | 0 | 0 | 0 | 0 | 0 | 0 | 0 |
| Manuel Neuer | 0 | 0 | 0 | 0 | 0 | 0 | 0 | 0 | 0 | 0 | 0 | 0 | 0 | 0 | 0 | 0 | 0 | 0 | 0 | 0 | 0 |
| Tom Starke | 0 | 0 | 0 | 0 | 0 | 0 | 0 | 0 | 0 | 0 | 0 | 0 | 0 | 0 | 0 | 0 | 0 | 0 | 0 | 0 | 0 |
| Lukas Raeder | 0 | 0 | 0 | 0 | 0 | 0 | 0 | 0 | 0 | 0 | 0 | 0 | 0 | 0 | 0 | 0 | 0 | 0 | 0 | 0 | 0 |
| Diego Contento | 1 | 0 | 0 | 1 | 0 | 0 | 0 | 0 | 0 | 0 | 0 | 0 | 0 | 0 | 0 | 0 | 0 | 0 | 0 | 0 | 0 |
| David Alaba | 0 | 0 | 0 | 0 | 0 | 0 | 0 | 0 | 0 | 0 | 0 | 0 | 0 | 0 | 0 | 0 | 0 | 0 | 0 | 0 | 0 |
| Holger Badstuber | 0 | 0 | 0 | 0 | 0 | 0 | 0 | 0 | 0 | 0 | 0 | 0 | 0 | 0 | 0 | 0 | 0 | 0 | 0 | 0 | 0 |
| Arjen Robben | 1 | 0 | 0 | 0 | 0 | 0 | 1 | 0 | 0 | 0 | 0 | 0 | 0 | 0 | 0 | 0 | 0 | 0 | 0 | 0 | 0 |
| Mitchell Weiser | 1 | 0 | 0 | 1 | 0 | 0 | 0 | 0 | 0 | 0 | 0 | 0 | 0 | 0 | 0 | 0 | 0 | 0 | 0 | 0 | 0 |
| Pierre-Emile Højbjerg | 1 | 0 | 0 | 0 | 0 | 0 | 1 | 0 | 0 | 0 | 0 | 0 | 0 | 0 | 0 | 0 | 0 | 0 | 0 | 0 | 0 |
| Mario Götze | 0 | 0 | 0 | 0 | 0 | 0 | 0 | 0 | 0 | 0 | 0 | 0 | 0 | 0 | 0 | 0 | 0 | 0 | 0 | 0 | 0 |
| Claudio Pizarro | 0 | 0 | 0 | 0 | 0 | 0 | 0 | 0 | 0 | 0 | 0 | 0 | 0 | 0 | 0 | 0 | 0 | 0 | 0 | 0 | 0 |
| Patrick Weihrauch | 0 | 0 | 0 | 0 | 0 | 0 | 0 | 0 | 0 | 0 | 0 | 0 | 0 | 0 | 0 | 0 | 0 | 0 | 0 | 0 | 0 |
| Totals | 68 | 1 | 3 | 45 | 0 | 2 | 9 | 0 | 0 | 1 | 0 | 0 | 13 | 1 | 1 | 1 | 0 | 0 | 0 | 0 | 0 |
| References | – | | | | | | | | | | | | | | | | | | | | |
Last updated: 19 May 2014

==== Suspensions ====
| Player | No. of matches served | Reason | Competition | Date served | Opponent(s) | Ref. |
|---|---|---|---|---|---|---|
| Jérôme Boateng | 1 | Red card vs. Manchester City | Champions League | 23 October | Viktoria Plzeň | |
| Jérôme Boateng | 1 | Fifth yellow card | Bundesliga | 14 December | Hamburger SV | |
| Mario Mandžukić | 1 | Fifth yellow card | Bundesliga | 15 February | SC Freiburg | |
| Dante | 1 | Third yellow card | Champions League | 1 April | Manchester United | |
| Javi Martínez | 1 | Third yellow card | Champions League | 9 April | Manchester United | |
| Bastian Schweinsteiger | 1 | Red card vs. Manchester United | Champions League | 9 April | Manchester United | |
| Toni Kroos | 1 | Fifth yellow card | Bundesliga | 19 April | Eintracht Braunschweig | |
| Rafinha | 3 | Red card vs. Borussia Dortmund | Bundesliga | 19 April | Eintracht Braunschweig | |
| Rafinha | 3 | Red card vs. Borussia Dortmund | Bundesliga | 26 April | Werder Bremen | |
| Rafinha | 3 | Red card vs. Borussia Dortmund | Bundesliga | 3 May | Hamburger SV | |
| Jérôme Boateng | 2 | Red card vs. Hamburger SV | Bundesliga | 10 May | VfB Stuttgart | |

== Reserve team ==
Erik ten Hag took over as coach of Bayern Munich II, who were in the fourth-tier Regionalliga Bayern. The team began the season with eight consecutive victories. and won their division, but lost the promotion playoff to Fortuna Köln on away goals after a 2–2 draw.

=== Squad ===
Note: Flags indicate national team as defined under FIFA eligibility rules; some limited exceptions apply. Players may hold more than one non-FIFA nationality.

| No. | Pos. | Nation | Player |
|---|---|---|---|
| 1 | GK | GER | Lukas Raeder |
| 2 | DF | GER | Benno Schmitz |
| 3 | MF | GER | Dennis Chessa |
| 4 | DF | GER | Stefan Buck |
| 5 | DF | GER | Daniel Wein |
| 6 | MF | GER | Rico Strieder |
| 7 | FW | GER | Tobias Schweinsteiger |
| 8 | MF | AUT | Christian Derflinger |
| 9 | MF | AUT | Alessandro Schöpf |
| 10 | FW | GER | Bastian Fischer |
| 11 | FW | GER | Patrick Weihrauch |
| 12 | GK | GER | Andreas Rössl |
| 13 | DF | AUT | Ylli Sallahi |
| 14 | MF | SUI | Etienne Scholz |
| 15 | DF | GER | Matthias Strohmaier |
| 16 | MF | GER | Vladimir Ranković |
| 17 | MF | DEN | Pierre-Emile Højbjerg |
| 18 | DF | GER | Lukas Grill |

| No. | Pos. | Nation | Player |
|---|---|---|---|
| 19 | MF | GER | Niklas Horn |
| 20 | FW | AUT | Kevin Friesenbichler |
| 21 | MF | USA | Julian Green |
| 22 | MF | GER | Nikola Jelišić |
| 23 | DF | GER | David Vržogić |
| 24 | DF | GER | Edwin Schwarz |
| 25 | GK | GER | Leopold Zingerle |
| 26 | MF | THA | Alexander Sieghart |
| 27 | FW | AUT | Oliver Markoutz |
| 29 | MF | GRE | Angelos Oikonomou |
| 30 | MF | GER | Mitchell Weiser |
| 31 | MF | GER | Maximilian Rothenbücher |
| 32 | DF | GER | Lucas Genkinger |
| 33 | DF | GER | Giuseppe Leo |
| 35 | FW | GER | Simon Seferings |
| 39 | GK | GER | Raif Husic |
| 40 | MF | FRA | Steven Ribéry |

== Notes ==
- 1.Kickoff time in Central European Time/Central European Summer Time.
- 2.Bayern Munich goals listed first.
- 3.Bayern won 5–4 in a shoot–out.
- 4.Players who left on or after 27 July.
- 5.The competition was only one match and the starting line–up was Tom Starke, Philipp Lahm, Daniel Van Buyten, Jérôme Boateng, David Alaba, Thiago, Thomas Müller, Toni Kroos, Arjen Robben, Mario Mandžukić, and Xherdan Shaqiri. Dante, Claudio Pizarro, and Bastian Schweinsteiger were substitutes for this match.
- 6.The competition was only one match and the starting line–up was Manuel Neuer, Dante, Rafinha, Jérôme Boateng, Philipp Lahm, Thomas Müller, David Alaba, Toni Kroos, Mario Mandžukić, and Arjen Robben. The substitutes were Mario Götze, Javi Martinez, and Xherdan Shaqiri.
- 7.The competition included two matches. The following players appeared in both matches: Manuel Neuer, Rafinha, Jérôme Boateng, Philipp Lahm, David Alaba, Thiago, Franck Ribéry, Javi Martínez, Xherdan Shaqiri, Mario Götze, Toni Kroos & Mario Mandžukić.
- 8.The competition included two matches. The following players started both matches: Manuel Neuer, Rafinha, Jérôme Boateng, Philipp Lahm, David Alaba, Thiago, Franck Ribéry, & Toni Kroos.
