= 2014 MLS All-Star Game =

Soccer game played in Portland, Oregon

2014 AT&T MLS All-Star Game
2014 AT&T MLS All-Star
- Event: 2014 Major League Soccer season
MLS All-Stars	Bayern Munich
(United States) (Canada)	(Germany)
2	1
- Date: August 6, 2014
- Venue: Providence Park, Portland, Oregon
- Most Valuable Player: Landon Donovan (MLS All-Stars)
- Referee: Jair Marrufo
- Attendance: 21,733

The 2014 AT&T Major League Soccer All-Star Game was the 19th annual Major League Soccer All-Star Game. It took place on August 6, 2014 at Providence Park, the home of MLS club Portland Timbers. The game was televised live on ESPN2 and UniMás in the United States, TSN and RDS in Canada, and in more than 130 other countries worldwide.

Bayern Munich was the second European team from outside the United Kingdom to play in the All-Star Game, following Roma in the 2013 MLS All-Star Game, and the first German team to play in the All-Star Game. They were also the first defending FIFA Club World Champions to play in the All-Star Game after winning the 2013 FIFA Club World Cup.

The MLS All-Stars defeated Bayern Munich 2–1. After giving up a goal in the eighth minute to Robert Lewandowski, the All-Stars pulled even early in the second-half on a goal by Bradley Wright-Phillips. Landon Donovan scored in the 70th minute to put the All-Stars ahead permanently. Donovan was named the game's Most Valuable Player, and the next day, he announced that he would retire at the end of the 2014 MLS season.

The game featured many players who had seen action in the 2014 FIFA World Cup weeks earlier. On the MLS side, Clint Dempsey, Matt Besler, DeAndre Yedlin, Kyle Beckerman (United States) and Tim Cahill (Australia), among others, all got time on the pitch. Bayern saw contributions from Julian Green (USA), Javi Martínez (Spain), Dante (Brazil), Xherdan Shaqiri (Switzerland) and Arjen Robben (Netherlands). Most notably, Bayern's six members of the World Cup winning-Germany national team—Phillip Lahm, Manuel Neuer, Bastian Schweinsteiger, Thomas Müller, Mario Götze and Jérôme Boateng—all made appearances to much fanfare.

Following the conclusion of the game, an incident between Caleb Porter, the manager of the Portland Timbers and the MLS All-Stars, and Pep Guardiola, the manager of Bayern, drew headlines. Guardiola refused to shake hands with Porter following the match and the two exchanged words, with Guardiola walking off the pitch angrily.

== Rosters ==
=== MLS All-Stars ===
Note: Flags indicate national team as defined under FIFA eligibility rules; some limited exceptions apply. Players may hold more than one non-FIFA nationality.

No.	Pos.	Nation	Player
2	MF	USA	Clint Dempsey (Seattle Sounders FC)^{[a]}
4	MF	USA	Michael Bradley (Toronto FC)^{[a]}
5	DF	USA	Matt Besler (Sporting Kansas City)^{[a]}
6	MF	CUB	Osvaldo Alonso (Seattle Sounders FC)^{[b]}
7	DF	USA	Sean Franklin (D.C. United)^{[e]}
8	MF	USA	Graham Zusi (Sporting Kansas City)^{[a]}
9	FW	NGA	Obafemi Martins (Seattle Sounders FC)^{[a]}
10	FW	USA	Landon Donovan (LA Galaxy)^{[a]}
11	MF	AUS	Tim Cahill (New York Red Bulls)^{[b]}
13	FW	ENG	Dom Dwyer (Sporting Kansas City)^{[e]}
14	FW	FRA	Thierry Henry (New York Red Bulls)^{[a]}
16	MF	ARG	Diego Valeri (Portland Timbers)^{[c]}
17	DF	USA	DeAndre Yedlin (Seattle Sounders FC)^{[a]}
18	GK	USA	Nick Rimando (Real Salt Lake)^{[a]}

No.	Pos.	Nation	Player
19	FW	MEX	Erick Torres (Chivas USA)^{[c]}
21	MF	USA	Maurice Edu (Philadelphia Union)^{[e]}
23	DF	USA	Michael Parkhurst (Columbus Crew)^{[b]}
24	DF	ENG	Liam Ridgewell (Portland Timbers)^{[e]}
28	GK	USA	Bill Hamid (D.C. United)^{[b]}
32	DF	USA	Bobby Boswell (D.C. United)^{[e]}
75	MF	CAN	Will Johnson (Portland Timbers)^{[b]}
78	DF	FRA	Aurélien Collin (Sporting Kansas City)^{[b]}
99	FW	ENG	Bradley Wright-Phillips (New York Red Bulls)^{[b]}
—	MF	USA	Kyle Beckerman (Real Salt Lake)^{[a]}^{[d]}
—	FW	ENG	Jermain Defoe (Toronto FC)^{[b]}^{[d]}
—	DF	USA	Omar Gonzalez (LA Galaxy)^{[a]}^{[d]}
—	FW	IRL	Robbie Keane (LA Galaxy)^{[b]}^{[d]}
—	DF	USA	Chad Marshall (Seattle Sounders FC)^{[b]}^{[d]}

Notes:

^{a} 2014 MLS All-Star Fan XI.
^{b} Selected by All-Star coach Caleb Porter of the Portland Timbers.
^{c} Selected by MLS Commissioner Don Garber.
^{d} Injured or unable to play.
^{e} Replacement for player who is injured or unable to play, selected by coach Caleb Porter.

=== Bayern Munich ===
Note: Flags indicate national team as defined under FIFA eligibility rules; some limited exceptions apply. Players may hold more than one non-FIFA nationality.

No.	Pos.	Nation	Player
1	GK	GER	Manuel Neuer
2	FW	GER	Tobias Schweinsteiger ^{[b]}
3	DF	GER	Philipp Walter ^{[c]}
4	DF	BRA	Dante
5	MF	GER	Gianluca Gaudino ^{[c]}
6	MF	ESP	Thiago ^{[a]}
7	MF	FRA	Franck Ribéry
8	MF	ESP	Javi Martínez
9	FW	POL	Robert Lewandowski
10	MF	NED	Arjen Robben
11	MF	SUI	Xherdan Shaqiri
13	DF	BRA	Rafinha
14	FW	PER	Claudio Pizarro
15	MF	GER	Lucas Scholl ^{[c]}
17	DF	GER	Jérôme Boateng
18	MF	ESP	Juan Bernat
19	MF	GER	Mario Götze

No.	Pos.	Nation	Player
20	MF	GER	Sebastian Rode
21	DF	GER	Philipp Lahm (captain)
22	GK	GER	Tom Starke
23	MF	GER	Mitchell Weiser ^{[a]}
24	MF	GRE	Angelos Oikonomou ^{[b]}
25	FW	GER	Thomas Müller
26	DF	GER	Diego Contento
27	DF	AUT	David Alaba
28	DF	GER	Holger Badstuber
29	GK	GER	Leopold Zingerle ^{[b]}
30	GK	AUT	Ivan Lučić ^{[a]}^{[b]}
31	MF	GER	Bastian Schweinsteiger (vice-captain)
33	FW	GER	Michael Eberwein ^{[c]}
34	MF	DEN	Pierre-Emile Højbjerg
37	MF	USA	Julian Green
38	DF	AUT	Ylli Sallahi ^{[b]}

Notes:

^{a} Injured or unable to play.
^{b} FC Bayern Munich II
^{c} Bayern Munich Junior Team

=== Referee crew ===
On July 8, it was announced that PRO's Jair Marrufo would referee the match, with Claudiu Badea and Corey Parker assistant referees and Ismail Elfath the fourth official.

== Match ==
=== Details ===
2014 MLS All-Star Game
August 6, 2014
6:30 p.m. PDT

MLS All-Stars (United States) (Canada)	2–1	(Germany) Bayern Munich
Wright-Phillips 51'; Donovan 70'	Report	Lewandowski 8'

Providence Park, Portland, Oregon
Attendance: 21,733
Referee: Jair Marrufo (United States)

MLS All-Stars	Bayern Munich

GK	18	(United States) Nick Rimando		(substituted off) 45'
RB	17	(United States) DeAndre Yedlin		(substituted off) 45'
CB	78	(France) Aurélien Collin		(substituted off) 45'
CB	5	(United States) Matt Besler		(substituted off) 45'
LB	23	(United States) Michael Parkhurst		(substituted off) 45'
CM	4	(United States) Michael Bradley		(substituted off) 45'
CM	11	(Australia) Tim Cahill		(substituted off) 45'
RW	8	(United States) Graham Zusi		(substituted off) 45'
AM	2	(United States) Clint Dempsey		(substituted off) 45'
LW	14	(France) Thierry Henry (c)		(substituted off) 48'
CF	9	(Nigeria) Obafemi Martins		(substituted off) 45'
Substitutes:
GK	28	(United States) Bill Hamid		(substituted on) 45'
DF	7	(United States) Sean Franklin		(substituted on) 45'
DF	24	(England) Liam Ridgewell		(substituted on) 45'
DF	32	(United States) Bobby Boswell		(substituted on) 45'
MF	6	(Cuba) Osvaldo Alonso	(yellow card) 64'	(substituted on) 45'
MF	16	(Argentina) Diego Valeri		(substituted on) 45'
MF	21	(United States) Maurice Edu		(substituted on) 45'
MF	75	(Canada) Will Johnson (c_{3})	(yellow card) 89'	(substituted on) 45'
FW	10	(United States) Landon Donovan (c_{2})		(substituted on) 48' (substituted off) 71'
FW	13	(England) Dom Dwyer		(substituted on) 71'
FW	19	(Mexico) Erick Torres		(substituted on) 45'
FW	99	(England) Bradley Wright-Phillips		(substituted on) 45'
Manager:
(United States) Caleb Porter

GK	22	(Germany) Tom Starke		(substituted off) 62'
CB	13	(Brazil) Rafinha
CB	8	(Spain) Javi Martínez
CB	27	(Austria) David Alaba (c)		(substituted off) 86'
RM	34	(Denmark) Pierre-Emile Højbjerg		(substituted off) 80'
CM	5	(Germany) Gianluca Gaudino		(substituted off) 62'
CM	20	(Germany) Sebastian Rode		(substituted off) 80'
LM	18	(Spain) Juan Bernat		(substituted off) 80'
AM	14	(Peru) Claudio Pizarro		(substituted off) 37'
CF	11	(Switzerland) Xherdan Shaqiri		(substituted off) 80'
CF	9	(Poland) Robert Lewandowski		(substituted off) 80'
Substitutes:
GK	1	(Germany) Manuel Neuer		(substituted on) 62'
GK	29	(Germany) Leopold Zingerle
GK	30	(Austria) Ivan Lučić
DF	3	(Germany) Philipp Walter
DF	4	(Brazil) Dante		(substituted on) 62'
DF	17	(Germany) Jérôme Boateng	(yellow card) 90+2'	(substituted on) 80'
DF	21	(Germany) Philipp Lahm (c_{2})		(substituted on) 82'
DF	26	(Germany) Diego Contento		(substituted on) 80'
DF	28	(Germany) Holger Badstuber
DF	38	(Austria) Ylli Sallahi
MF	7	(France) Franck Ribéry
MF	10	(Netherlands) Arjen Robben		(substituted on) 86'
MF	15	(Germany) Lucas Scholl
MF	19	(Germany) Mario Götze		(substituted on) 80'
MF	24	(Greece) Angelos Oikonomou
MF	31	(Germany) Bastian Schweinsteiger		(substituted on) 80' (substituted off) 88'
MF	37	(United States) Julian Green		(substituted on) 37' (substituted off) 82'
FW	2	(Germany) Tobias Schweinsteiger
FW	25	(Germany) Thomas Müller		(substituted on) 80'
FW	33	(Germany) Michael Eberwein
Manager:
(Spain) Pep Guardiola

MLS All-Star MVP:
(United States) Landon Donovan (MLS All-Stars)

Assistant referees:
Claudio Badea
Corey Parker
Fourth official:
Ismail Elfath

Match rules

- 90 minutes.
- Unlimited substitutions.
- No extra time.
- Penalty shoot-out if scores still level.

== Aftermath ==
After the match, Bayern manager Pep Guardiola refused to shake the hand of MLS All-Stars manager Caleb Porter, despite Porter's multiple attempts. Guardiola seemed to be angry over rough challenges by MLS players during the exhibition match resulting in yellow cards, particularly those of Osvaldo Alonso and Will Johnson on Xherdan Shaqiri and Bastian Schweinsteiger respectively. Bayern Munich, in pre-season, had just arrived in the U.S. and had six players who played for Germany's World Cup-winning squad in July (although none started the game), whereas MLS players were halfway through the current season. Guardiola backtracked from his behavior post-game, stating, "We tried to play and we did. Congratulations to MLS for this victory. I hope they are going to invite us next year to try and make revenge and I hope to prepare a little bit better."
