= Lucas Scholl =

German footballer (born 1996)

Personal information
- Full name: Lucas-Julian Scholl
- Date of birth: 5 July 1996 (age 30)
- Place of birth: Munich, Germany
- Height: 1.80 m (5 ft 11 in)
- Position: Midfielder

Team information
- Current team: FC Wacker Innsbruck
- Number: 8

Youth career
- Bayern Munich

Senior career*
Years	Team	Apps	(Gls)
2014–2015	Bayern Munich	0	(0)
2015–2017	Bayern Munich II	23	(1)
2017–2020	Wacker Nordhausen	49	(5)
2020	VfR Garching	1	(0)
2020–2021	SV Horn	16	(0)
2022–	FC Wacker Innsbruck	75	(11)
- * Club domestic league appearances and goals as of 26 June 2026

Lucas-Julian Scholl (born 5 July 1996) is a German professional footballer who plays as a midfielder for Austrian Regionalliga West club FC Wacker Innsbruck.

== Career ==
=== Bayern Munich ===
Scholl played a lot of years for the youth teams of FC Bayern Munich. From the 2012–13 season he played for Bayern's U-17s in the B-Junioren-Bundesliga, in which he made 24 appearances during that season. For the 2013–14 season he was promoted to the U-19 squad. In his first season on the team, he made 20 appearances in the A-Juniors Bundesliga and also played four games in the UEFA Youth League. Without having played for the clubs reserve team at all before, Scholl was in the professional team of Munich for the first time under Pep Guardiola against VfL Wolfsburg in August 2014. However, he was not used and remained on the bench. In the 2014–15 season he made 23 appearances for the U-19s in the Bundesliga and five appearances in the Youth League.

For the 2015–16 season he was promoted into the squad of Bayern's second team. In August 2015, he made his debut in the Regionalliga when he came on as a substitute for Julian Green in the 74th minute on the seventh matchday of that season against SV Schalding-Heining. In October 2015, he scored his first and only goal for FC Bayern Munich II in a 2–2 draw in the fourth-highest division. In a year and a half at Bayern II, he made 23 Regionalliga appearances.

=== Wacker 90 Nordhausen ===
For the second half of 2016–17, Scholl signed for German fourth division side FSV Wacker 90 Nordhausen after failing to make an official appearance for FC Bayern Munich, Germany's most successful club. After his first season there, Scholl received offers from the German second and third divisions but chose to stay with FSV Wacker 90 Nordhausen. However, getting pneumonia as well as an injury later limited his playing time. In three years, he played 50 games in the Regionalliga and scored five goals

=== Garching ===
For the second half of 2019–20, Scholl signed for another fourth division team, VfR Garching, due to FSV Wacker 90 Nordhausen going bankrupt.

=== SV Horn ===
In 2020, he signed for SV Horn in the Austrian 2. Liga.

=== Wacker Innsbruck ===
In July 2022, Scholl joined Tiroler Liga club FC Wacker Innsbruck.

== Personal life ==
He is the son of Germany international Mehmet Scholl.
