= Matthias Strohmaier =

German footballer

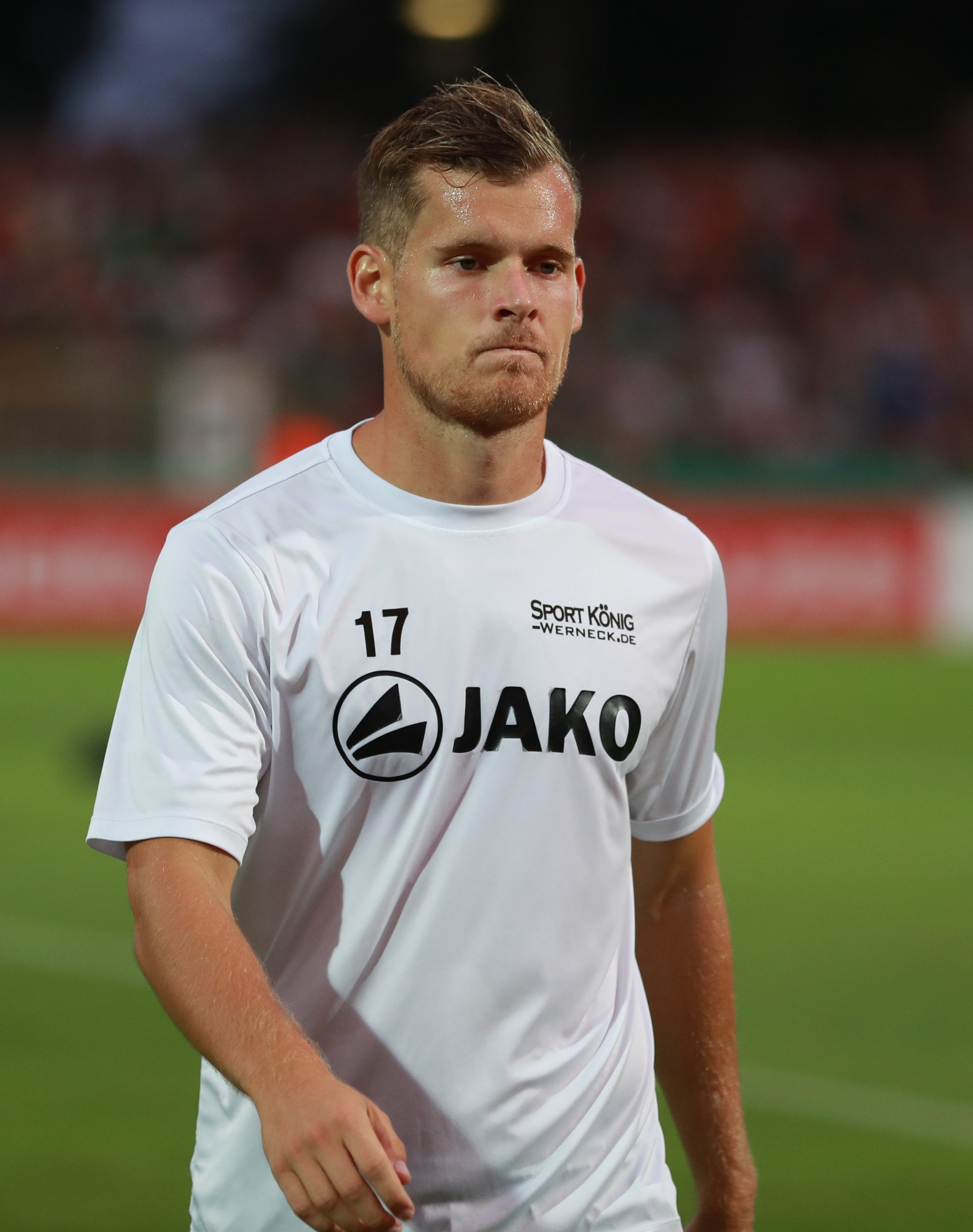
- Strohmaier in 2018

Personal information
- Date of birth: 11 March 1994 (age 32)
- Place of birth: Dingolfing, Germany
- Height: 1.88 m (6 ft 2 in)
- Position: Centre-back

Team information
- Current team: VfB Hallbergmoos
- Number: 5

Youth career
- 1860 Munich

Senior career*
Years	Team	Apps	(Gls)
2012–2014	Augsburg II	45	(4)
2014–2016	Bayern Munich II	47	(2)
2016–2017	FC Vaduz	1	(0)
2017–2019	Schweinfurt 05	51	(4)
2019–2020	VfR Garching	20	(1)
2020–2021	Türkspor Augsburg	6	(0)
2021–	VfB Hallbergmoos	2	(0)
- * Club domestic league appearances and goals as of 08:25, 8 April 2022 (UTC)

Matthias Strohmaier (born 11 March 1994) is a German professional footballer who plays as centre-back for VfB Hallbergmoos.

== Honours ==
FC Vaduz

- Liechtenstein Football Cup: 2016-17
