= Giuseppe Leo =

German-Italian footballer

Personal information
- Date of birth: 30 January 1995 (age 31)
- Place of birth: Munich, Germany
- Height: 1.93 m (6 ft 4 in)
- Position: Defender

Youth career
- –2014: Bayern Munich

Senior career*
Years	Team	Apps	(Gls)
2014–2015	Bayern Munich II	0	(0)
2015–2017	FC Ingolstadt II	50	(1)
2017–2018	Karlsruher SC	1	(0)
2018–2020	FC Aarau	50	(0)
- * Club domestic league appearances and goals as of 13:45, 9 April 2022 (UTC)

Giuseppe Leo (born 30 January 1995) is a German-Italian professional footballer who plays as a defender.
