= Lukas Grill (footballer, born 1993) =

German footballer

Personal information
- Date of birth: 9 February 1993 (age 33)
- Place of birth: Germany
- Position: Defender

Youth career
- –2012: Bayern Munich

Senior career*
Years	Team	Apps	(Gls)
2012–2014	Bayern Munich II	16	(1)
2014–2015	Mjällby	36	(2)
Total		52	(3)
- * Club domestic league appearances and goals

Lukas Grill (born 9 February 1993) is a German former professional footballer who plays as a defender.
