= Maximilian Riedmüller =

German footballer

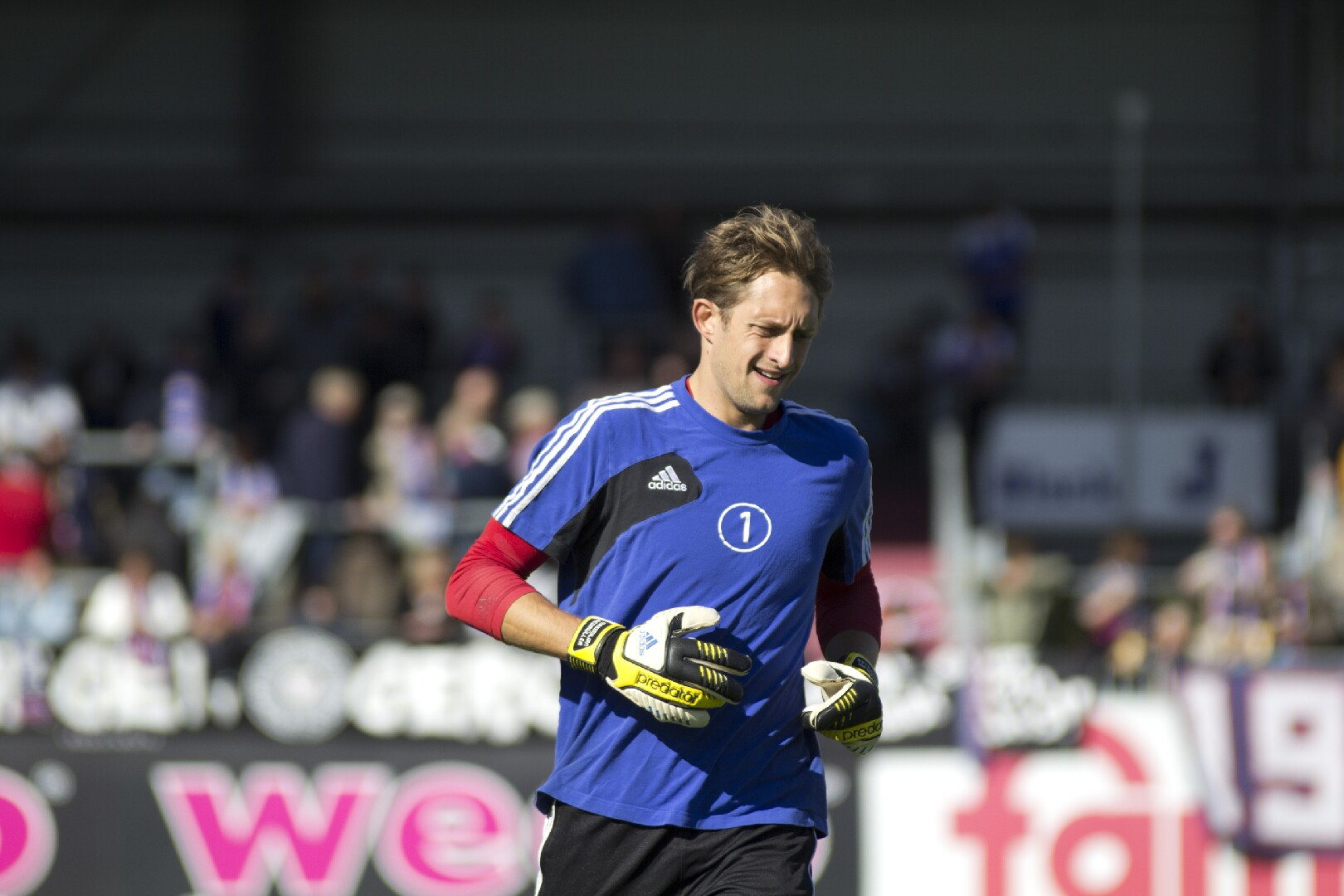

Personal information
- Full name: Maximilian Riedmüller
- Date of birth: 4 January 1988 (age 38)
- Place of birth: Munich, West Germany
- Height: 1.89 m (6 ft 2 in)
- Position: Goalkeeper

Team information
- Current team: TuS Holzkirchen

Youth career
- 1994–2003: FV Hansa Neuhausen
- 2003–2007: TSV Forstenried

Senior career*
Years	Team	Apps	(Gls)
2007–2008	SV Heimstetten	26	(0)
2008–2013	Bayern Munich II	53	(0)
2011–2013	Bayern Munich	0	(0)
2013–2015	Holstein Kiel	17	(0)
2016–2024	SV Heimstetten	207	(0)
2024-	TuS Holzkirchen	0	(0)
Medal record
Bayern Munich
Runner-up	DFB-Pokal	2012
Runner-up	UEFA Champions League	2012
Winner	DFL-Supercup	2012
Winner	Bundesliga	2013
Winner	UEFA Champions League	2013
Winner	DFB-Pokal	2013
- * Club domestic league appearances and goals as of 27 January 2021

Maximilian Riedmüller (born 4 January 1988) is a German footballer who plays as a goalkeeper for TuS Holzkirchen.

== Career ==
Riedmüller spent five years playing for Bayern Munich II, making his debut on 1 March 2009, as a substitute for the injured Thomas Kraft in a 3. Liga match against Carl Zeiss Jena. He was promoted to Bayern Munich's first team for the 2011–12 season, and given the squad number 24. He was released by Bayern at the end of the 2012–13 season and signed for Holstein Kiel.

In 2016, Riedmüller returned to SV Heimstetten.

== Honours ==
Bayern Munich

- Bundesliga: 2012–13
- DFB-Pokal: 2012–13
- DFL-Supercup: 2012
- UEFA Champions League: 2012–13
