= Raif Husić =

German footballer

Personal information
- Date of birth: 5 February 1996 (age 30)
- Place of birth: Zusmarshausen, Germany
- Height: 1.90 m (6 ft 3 in)
- Position: Goalkeeper

Youth career
- –2010: TSV Zusmarshausen
- 2010–2012: FC Augsburg
- 2012–2014: Bayern Munich

Senior career*
Years	Team	Apps	(Gls)
2013–2014	Bayern Munich II	8	(0)
2014–2016	Werder Bremen II	13	(0)
2014–2015	Werder Bremen	0	(0)
2016–2019	VfR Aalen	7	(0)
2019	Wacker Burghausen	0	(0)
Total		28	(0)

International career
2011	Germany U15	1	(0)
2011–2012	Germany U16	3	(0)
2012–2014	Germany U17	9	(0)
2014	Germany U18	1	(0)
2014	Germany U19	4	(0)
- * Club domestic league appearances and goals

Raif Husić (born 5 February 1996) is a Bosnian-German former professional footballer who played as a goalkeeper.

== Career ==
Husić joined Regionalliga Bayern club Wacker Burghausen in the 2019 summer break in an attempt to regain professional fitness but left the club in mid-July with the intention to focus on his "job-related career".
