= Angelos Ikonomou =

Greek footballer

Personal information
- Date of birth: 23 August 1995 (age 31)
- Place of birth: Thessaloniki, Greece
- Height: 1.75 m (5 ft 9 in)
- Position: Central midfielder

Team information
- Current team: Panserraikos
- Number: 8

Youth career
- 2009–2014: Bayern Munich

Senior career*
Years	Team	Apps	(Gls)
2014–2016	Bayern Munich II	46	(0)
2016	SV Waldhof Mannheim	0	(0)
2016–2017	VfB Stuttgart II	10	(0)
2017–2019	OFI	6	(0)
2019–2020	Doxa Drama	9	(0)
2020	Platanias	5	(0)
2020–2022	Veria	47	(0)
2022–2024	Panserraikos	12	(0)
2024–2025	AEL	20	(1)
2025–2026	Kalamata	21	(0)
2026–	Panserraikos	3	(0)

International career^{‡}
2012	Greece U17	2	(0)
2013–2014	Greece U19	2	(0)
- * Club domestic league appearances and goals as of 20 September 2026 ‡ National team caps and goals as of 5 March 2014

Angelos Ikonomou (Greek: Άγγελος Οικονόμου; born 23 August 1995) is a Greek professional footballer who plays as a midfielder for Super League 2 club Panserraikos.

== Honours ==
OFI

- Football League: 2017–18

Veria

- Football League: 2020–21
