= Ylli Sallahi =

Austrian footballer (born 1994)

Personal information
- Date of birth: 6 April 1994 (age 32)
- Place of birth: Skenderaj, FR Yugoslavia
- Height: 1.75 m (5 ft 9 in)
- Position: Left-back

Youth career
- 1998–2011: Kapfenberger SV
- 2011–2012: Bayern Munich

Senior career*
Years	Team	Apps	(Gls)
2012–2014	Bayern Munich II	48	(11)
2014	Bayern Munich	1	(0)
2015–2017	Karlsruher SC	33	(3)
2016–2017	Karlsruher SC II	1	(0)

International career^{‡}
2014–2016	Austria U21	11	(2)
- * Club domestic league appearances and goals as of 21:42, 17 June 2017 (UTC) ‡ National team caps and goals as of 21:42, 17 June 2017 (UTC)

Ylli Sallahi (born 6 April 1994) is an Austrian professional footballer who plays as a left-back and is a free agent. He most recently played for Karlsruher SC in the 3. Liga.

== Early life ==
Born in Skenderaj to a Kosovar-Albanian family, Sallahi moved to Austria when he was only eight months old.

== Club career ==
=== Early career ===
In his youth he played for local club Kapfenberger SV before being signed by Bayern Munich in 2011. He commented "I want to develop my career in a big club." He was a regular for the youth team, playing 27 matches in the first season for the U19 team.

On 5 April 2014, Sallahi made his Bundesliga debut, starting away to FC Augsburg, after head coach Pep Guardiola decided to rest some of the players of the first team for the UEFA Champions League quarter-final against Manchester United. He was substituted after 51 minutes for David Alaba as Bayern, who were already league champions, lost 1–0.

=== Karlsruher SC ===
On 19 December 2014, effective 1 January 2015, Sallahi signed a contract with Karlsruher SC which runs to June 2018. He left the club after the 2016–17 season.

In late August 2017 Sallahi started a trial with TSV 1860 Munich but had to end training early after 30 minutes, "probably due to a muscle injury".

== International career ==
In January 2014, Sallahi refused to play for Albania, whereas in May of that year he declared he would not play for Austria either, but only for Kosovo. Nevertheless, he made his debut for the Austria U21 team in a 4–2 victory over the Czech U21 on 14 November 2014, and has thus far earned five caps.

On 21 September 2016, Sallahi agreed to play for the Kosovo national team, his country of birth.

== Honours ==
Bayern Munich

- Bundesliga: 2013–14
- DFB-Pokal: 2013–14
