= 2015–16 TSG 1899 Hoffenheim season =

TSG 1899 Hoffenheim
2015–16 season
- Co-presidents: Jochen A. Rotthaus; Frank Briel
- Manager: Huub Stevens (until 10 February); Julian Nagelsmann (from 11 February)
- Stadium: Rhein-Neckar-Arena
- Bundesliga: 15th
- DFB-Pokal: First round
- Top goalscorer: League: Mark Uth; Kevin Volland (8 each); All: Mark Uth; Kevin Volland (8 each)
Home colours	Away colours	Third colours

The 2015–16 TSG 1899 Hoffenheim season is the 117th season in the club's football history. In the previous season, Hoffenheim had finished in eighth place.

== First team squad ==
As of 24 August 2015
Note: Flags indicate national team as defined under FIFA eligibility rules; some limited exceptions apply. Players may hold more than one non-FIFA nationality.

No.	Pos.	Nation	Player
1	GK	GER	Oliver Baumann
3	DF	CZE	Pavel Kadeřábek
4	DF	BIH	Ermin Bičakčić
5	DF	SUI	Fabian Schär
6	MF	GER	Sebastian Rudy
8	MF	POL	Eugen Polanski
9	FW	CHI	Eduardo Vargas
10	MF	FRA	Jonathan Schmid
11	MF	SWE	Jiloan Hamad
12	DF	GER	Tobias Strobl
13	GK	GER	Jens Grahl
14	MF	NOR	Tarik Elyounoussi
15	DF	GER	Jeremy Toljan
16	MF	SUI	Pirmin Schwegler
17	MF	SUI	Steven Zuber

No.	Pos.	Nation	Player
18	MF	GER	Nadiem Amiri
19	FW	GER	Mark Uth
20	DF	KOR	Kim Jin-su
21	DF	GER	Nicolai Rapp
22	FW	GER	Kevin Kurányi
25	DF	GER	Niklas Süle
28	FW	HUN	Ádám Szalai
30	FW	GER	Philipp Ochs
31	FW	GER	Kevin Volland
32	DF	GER	Benedikt Gimber
33	GK	GER	Alexander Stolz
38	MF	GER	Kai Herdling
40	FW	BRA	Joelinton
—	MF	SRB	Filip Malbašić

=== Players out on loan ===
Note: Flags indicate national team as defined under FIFA eligibility rules; some limited exceptions apply. Players may hold more than one non-FIFA nationality.

No.	Pos.	Nation	Player
—	GK	GER	Marvin Schwäbe (at VfL Osnabrück)
—	GK	CRO	Marko Marić (at Lechia Gdańsk)
—	DF	BRA	Gabriel Silva (at Grêmio)
—	DF	AUT	Christoph Martschinko (at Austria Wien)
—	DF	GER	Kevin Akpoguma (at Fortuna Düsseldorf)
—	MF	PER	Junior Ponce (at Universidad San Martín)
—	MF	BRA	Guilherme Biteco (at Santa Cruz)

No.	Pos.	Nation	Player
—	MF	BRA	Felipe Pires (at FSV Frankfurt)
—	MF	BRA	Bruno Nazário (at Lechia Gdańsk)
—	FW	GER	Joshua Mees (at SC Freiburg)
—	FW	GER	Janik Haberer (at VfL Bochum)
—	FW	KOR	In-Hyeok Park (at FSV Frankfurt)
—	FW	CRO	Antonio Čolak (at 1. FC Kaiserslautern)

== Transfers ==
=== In ===
No.	Pos.	Name	Age	NAT	Moving from	Type	Transfer Window	Contract ends	Transfer fee	Sources
9	FW	Eduardo Vargas	25	Chile	Napoli	Transfer	Summer	2019	€6,000,000	
5	DF	Fabian Schär	23	Switzerland	Basel	Transfer	Summer	2019	€4,000,000	
10	MF	Jonathan Schmid	25	France	SC Freiburg	Transfer	Summer	2019	€3,700,000	
3	DF	Pavel Kadeřábek	23	Czech Republic	Sparta Prague	Transfer	Summer	2019	€3,500,000	
19	FW	Mark Uth	23	Germany	Heerenveen	Transfer	Summer	2018	€2,200,000	
40	FW	Joelinton	18	Brazil	Sport Recife	Transfer	Summer	2020	€2,200,000	
—	FW	Antonio Čolak	21	Croatia	1. FC Nürnberg	Transfer	Summer	2017	€500,000	
—	GK	Marko Marić	19	Croatia	Rapid Wien	Transfer	Summer		€500,000	
22	FW	Kevin Kurányi	33	Germany	Dynamo Moscow	Transfer	Summer	2016	Free	
—	DF	Christoph Martschinko	21	Austria	SV Grödig	Transfer	Summer	2018		
—	FW	Park In-hyeok	19	South Korea	Kyung Hee University	Transfer	Summer			
36	MF	Grischa Prömel	20	Germany	1899 Hoffenheim	Promoted	Summer	—	—	
29	FW	Joshua Mees	19	Germany	1899 Hoffenheim U19	Promoted	Summer	2016	—	
30	FW	Philipp Ochs	18	Germany	1899 Hoffenheim U19	Promoted	Summer	2016	—	
32	DF	Benedikt Gimber	18	Germany	1899 Hoffenheim U19	Promoted	Summer	2019	—	
21	DF	Nicolai Rapp	18	Germany	1899 Hoffenheim U19	Promoted	Summer	2018	—	
11	FW	Jiloan Hamad	24	Sweden	Standard Liège	End of Loan	Summer	2017	—	—
—	FW	Filip Malbašić	22	Serbia	Lechia Gdańsk	End of Loan	Summer	2016	—	—
25	DF	Luis Advíncula	25	Peru	Sporting Cristal	End of Loan	Summer		—	—
41	MF	Afriyie Acquah	23	Ghana	Sampdoria	End of Loan	Summer		—	—
17	MF	Tobias Weis	29	Germany	VfL Bochum	End of Loan	Summer		—	—
32	MF	Vincenzo Grifo	22	Italy	FSV Frankfurt	End of Loan	Summer		—	—
27	MF	Sandro Wieser	22	Liechtenstein	FC Aarau	End of Loan	Summer		—	—
—	FW	Júnior Ponce	21	Peru	Vitória de Setúbal	End of Loan	Summer		—	—
—	FW	Michael Gregoritsch	21	Austria	VfL Bochum	End of Loan	Summer		—	—
—	MF	Felipe Pires	20	Brazil	Red Bull Salzburg	Transfer	Summer		Undisclosed	

=== Out ===
No.	Pos.	Name	Age	NAT	Moving to	Type	Transfer Window	Transfer fee	Sources
10	FW	Roberto Firmino	23	Brazil	Liverpool	Transfer	Summer	€41,000,000	
27	FW	Anthony Modeste	27	France	1. FC Köln	Transfer	Summer	€4,500,000	
41	MF	Afriyie Acquah	23	Ghana	Torino	Transfer	Summer	€2,800,000	
9	FW	Sven Schipplock	26	Germany	Hamburger SV	Transfer	Summer	€2,500,000	
2	DF	Andreas Beck	28	Germany	Beşiktaş	Transfer	Summer	€1,750,000	
19	DF	David Abraham	28	Argentina	Eintracht Frankfurt	Transfer	Summer	€1,500,000	
25	DF	Luis Advíncula	25	Peru	Bursaspor	Transfer	Summer	€1,500,000	
32	MF	Vincenzo Grifo	22	Italy	SC Freiburg	Transfer	Summer	€1,000,000	
—	FW	Michael Gregoritsch	21	Austria	VfL Bochum	Transfer	Summer	€500,000	
23	MF	Sejad Salihović	30	Bosnia and Herzegovina	Guizhou Renhe	Transfer	Summer	Free	
17	MF	Tobias Weis	29	Germany	VfL Bochum	Transfer	Summer	Free	
36	MF	Grischa Prömel	20	Germany	Karlsruher SC	Transfer	Summer	Free	
27	MF	Sandro Wieser	22	Liechtenstein	Thun	Transfer	Summer		
21	DF	Kevin Akpoguma	20	Germany	Fortuna Düsseldorf	Loan	Summer	Free	
26	FW	Janik Haberer	21	Germany	VfL Bochum	Loan	Summer	Free	
35	GK	Marvin Schwäbe	20	Germany	VfL Osnabrück	Loan	Summer	Free	
—	FW	Júnior Ponce	21	Peru	USMP	Loan	Summer	Free	
—	FW	Antonio Čolak	21	Croatia	1. FC Kaiserslautern	Loan	Summer	Free	
—	DF	Christoph Martschinko	21		Austria Wien	Loan	Summer	Free	
—	GK	Marko Marić	19	Croatia	Lechia Gdańsk	Loan	Summer	Free	
—	FW	In-Hyeok Park	19	South Korea	FSV Frankfurt	Loan	Summer	Free	

== Competitions ==
Win Draw Loss

=== Bundesliga ===
==== League table ====
Pos	Team	Pld	W	D	L	GF	GA	GD	Pts	Qualification or relegation
13	Werder Bremen	34	10	8	16	50	65	−15	38	
14	Darmstadt 98	34	9	11	14	38	53	−15	38	
15	1899 Hoffenheim	34	9	10	15	39	54	−15	37	
16	Eintracht Frankfurt (O)	34	9	9	16	34	52	−18	36	Qualification for the relegation play-offs
17	VfB Stuttgart (R)	34	9	6	19	50	75	−25	33	Relegation to 2. Bundesliga

Source: DFB
Rules for classification: 1) Points; 2) Goal difference; 3) Goals scored; 4) Head-to-head points; 5) Head-to-head goal difference; 6) Head-to-head away goals scored; 7) Away goals scored; 8) Play-offs.
(O) Play-off winners; (R) Relegated

==== Results summary ====
Overall								Home						Away					
Pld	W	D	L	GF	GA	GD	Pts	W	D	L	GF	GA	GD	W	D	L	GF	GA	GD
34	9	10	15	39	54	−15	37	6	6	5	22	25	−3	3	4	10	17	29	−12

Last updated: 14 May 2016.
Source: Bundesliga

==== Results by round ====
Round	1	2	3	4	5	6	7	8	9	10	11	12	13	14	15	16	17	18	19	20	21	22	23	24	25	26	27	28	29	30	31	32	33	34
Ground	A	H	A	H	A	H	A	H	A	H	A	H	A	H	A	H	A	H	A	H	A	H	A	H	A	H	A	H	A	H	A	H	A	H
Result	L	L	D	L	L	D	W	D	L	L	D	D	L	D	D	W	L	D	L	L	D	W	L	W	L	W	W	D	W	W	L	W	L	L
Position	11	16	14	15	15	17	15	15	17	17	17	17	18	18	18	17	18	17	17	17	17	17	17	17	17	17	16	14	14	13	14	13	14	15

Updated to match(es) played on 14 May 2016. Source: Bundesliga
A = Away; H = Home; W = Win; D = Draw; L = Loss

==== Matches ====
15 August 2015 1	Bayer Leverkusen	2–1	1899 Hoffenheim	Leverkusen
15:30 CEST (UTC+02:00)	Wendell (yellow card) 11'; Kießling 45'; Brandt 71'	Report	Zuber 5'	Stadium: BayArena; Attendance: 27,125; Referee: Robert Hartmann

22 August 2015 2	1899 Hoffenheim	1–2	Bayern Munich	Sinsheim
15:30 CEST (UTC+02:00)	Volland 1'; Schwegler (yellow card) 63'; Kim (yellow card) 77'; Polanski (yellow card) 89'	Report	Müller 41', (yellow card) 75'; Boateng (yellow card) 71' (yellow-red card) 73'; Rafinha (yellow card) 83'; Lewandowski 90'	Stadium: Wirsol Rhein-Neckar-Arena; Attendance: 30,150; Referee: Tobias Stieler

29 August 2015 3	Darmstadt 98	0–0	1899 Hoffenheim	Darmstadt
15:30 CEST (UTC+02:00)	Niemeyer (yellow card) 25'; Gondorf (yellow card) 54'; Garics (yellow card) 62'	Report	Zuber (yellow card) 14'; Uth (yellow card) 25'	Stadium: Merck-Stadion am Böllenfalltor; Attendance: 17,000; Referee: Marco Fritz

13 September 2015 4	1899 Hoffenheim	1–3	Werder Bremen	Sinsheim
15:30 CEST (UTC+02:00)	Vargas 49'; Volland (yellow card) 53'; Polanski (yellow card) 60'	Report	Junuzović (yellow card) 18', (goal) 45', 90+3'; Lukimya (yellow card) 66'; Fritz (yellow card) 69'; Ujah 90+2', (yellow card) 90+2'	Stadium: Wirsol Rhein-Neckar-Arena; Attendance: 28,312; Referee: Jochen Drees

18 September 2015 5	Mainz 05	3–1	1899 Hoffenheim	Mainz
20:30 CEST (UTC+02:00)	Mallı 18', 61', 68'; Niederlechner (yellow card) 90'	Report	Schmid 13'; Schär (yellow card) 41'; Bičakčić (yellow card) 49'	Stadium: Coface Arena; Attendance: 28,973; Referee: Daniel Siebert

23 September 2015 6	1899 Hoffenheim	1–1	Borussia Dortmund	Sinsheim
20:00 CEST (UTC+02:00)	Bičakčić (yellow card) 9'; Rudy 42'; Volland (yellow card) 82'	Report	Aubameyang 55'; Gündoğan (yellow card) 69'	Stadium: Wirsol Rhein-Neckar-Arena; Attendance: 29,700; Referee: Tobias Welz

26 September 2015 7	FC Augsburg	1–3	1899 Hoffenheim	Augsburg
15:30 CEST (UTC+02:00)	Koo 38'; Hong (yellow card) 68'	Report	Volland 10', 68' (pen.), (yellow card) 60'; Strobl (yellow card) 48'; Süle (yellow card) 65'; Schmid 73'; Schwegler (yellow card) 78'	Stadium: WWK ARENA; Attendance: 27,112; Referee: Manuel Gräfe

3 October 2015 8	1899 Hoffenheim	2–2	VfB Stuttgart	Sinsheim
15:30 CEST (UTC+02:00)	Volland 33' (pen.), 77', (yellow card) 78'; Rudy (yellow card) 60'; Schwegler (yellow card) 90+3'	Report	Kliment 64'; Schwaab (yellow card) 73'; Werner 90'	Stadium: Wirsol Rhein-Neckar-Arena; Attendance: 30,150; Referee: Deniz Aytekin

17 October 2015 9	VfL Wolfsburg	4–2	1899 Hoffenheim	Wolfsburg
15:30 CEST (UTC+02:00)	Kruse 1', 62', 83'; Dost 7'; Caligiuri (yellow card) 57'; Träsch (yellow card) 59'; Luiz Gustavo (yellow card) 71'; Vieirinha (yellow card) 85'	Report	Toljan 29'; Schmid 54'	Stadium: Volkswagen Arena; Attendance: 28,148; Referee: Felix Brych

23 October 2015 10	1899 Hoffenheim	0–1	Hamburger SV	Sinsheim
20:30 CEST (UTC+02:00)	Bičakčić (yellow card) 11' (yellow-red card) 68'; Polanski (yellow card) 80'; Volland (yellow card) 89'	Report	Holtby (yellow card) 26'; Ostrzolek (yellow card) 57'; Gregoritsch (yellow card) 77'; Schipplock (yellow card) 84'; Lasogga 88'	Stadium: Wirsol Rhein-Neckar-Arena; Attendance: 30,000; Referee: Daniel Siebert

31 October 2015 11	1. FC Köln	0–0	1899 Hoffenheim	Cologne
15:30 CET (UTC+01:00)	Osako (yellow card) 66'; Maroh (yellow card) 74'	Report	Schwegler (yellow card) 30'	Stadium: RheinEnergieSTADION; Attendance: 48,000; Referee: Günter Perl

7 November 2015 12	1899 Hoffenheim	0–0	Eintracht Frankfurt	Sinsheim
15:30 CET (UTC+01:00)	Schwegler (yellow card) 68'	Report	Seferovic (yellow card) 11'; Zambrano (yellow card) 78'; Stendera (yellow card) 90+3'	Stadium: Wirsol Rhein-Neckar-Arena; Attendance: 30,150; Referee: Knut Kircher

22 November 2015 13	Hertha BSC	1–0	1899 Hoffenheim	Berlin
15:30 CET (UTC+01:00)	Polanski 30' (o.g.); Lustenberger (yellow card) 35'; Skjelbred (yellow card) 85'	Report	Polanski (yellow card) 32'	Stadium: Olympiastadion; Attendance: 37,045; Referee: Guido Winkmann

28 November 2015 14	1899 Hoffenheim	3–3	Borussia Mönchengladbach	Sinsheim
15:30 CET (UTC+01:00)	Amiri (yellow card) 8', (goal) 47'; Zuber 11'; Polanski 34'; Kim (yellow card) 59'	Report	Johnson 5', 87'; Dahoud (yellow card) 25'; Drmić 56'	Stadium: Wirsol Rhein-Neckar-Arena; Attendance: 30,150; Referee: Michael Weiner

5 December 2015 15	FC Ingolstadt	1–1	1899 Hoffenheim	Ingolstadt
15:30 CET (UTC+01:00)	Morales (yellow card) 50'; Roger 66'; Lex (yellow card) 80'	Report	Schär (yellow card) 74'; Uth 90+6'	Stadium: Audi Sportpark; Attendance: 14,255; Referee: Manuel Gräfe

12 December 2015 16	1899 Hoffenheim	1–0	Hannover 96	Sinsheim
15:30 CET (UTC+01:00)	Schär (yellow card) 19'; Schmid 30'	Report	Gülselam (yellow card) 38'; Albornoz (yellow card) 72'; Andreasen (yellow card) 82'	Stadium: Wirsol Rhein-Neckar-Arena; Attendance: 25,531; Referee: Jochen Drees

18 December 2015 17	Schalke 04	1–0	1899 Hoffenheim	Gelsenkirchen
20:30 CET (UTC+01:00)	Choupo-Moting 28'; Goretzka (yellow card) 90+1'	Report	Strobl (yellow card) 57'; Rudy (yellow card) 58'	Stadium: Veltins-Arena; Attendance: 60,749; Referee: Sascha Stegemann

23 January 2016 18	1899 Hoffenheim	1–1	Bayer Leverkusen	Sinsheim
15:30 CET (UTC+01:00)	Kim (yellow card) 17'; Hamad 40', (yellow card) 73'	Report	Jedvaj (yellow card) 58'; Toprak 75'; Donati (yellow card) 86'	Stadium: Wirsol Rhein-Neckar-Arena; Attendance: 24,140; Referee: Marco Fritz

31 January 2016 19	Bayern Munich	2–0	1899 Hoffenheim	Munich
17:30 CET (UTC+01:00)	Douglas Costa (yellow card) 28'; Lewandowski 32', 64'	Report	Strobl (yellow card) 28'	Stadium: Allianz Arena; Attendance: 75,000; Referee: Jochen Drees

7 February 2016 20	1899 Hoffenheim	0–2	Darmstadt 98	Sinsheim
17:30 CET (UTC+01:00)	Amiri (yellow card) 73'	Report	Sulu 33'; Heller (yellow card) 73'; Niemeyer (yellow card) 81'; Rajković (yellow card) 82', (goal) 85'	Stadium: Wirsol Rhein-Neckar-Arena; Attendance: 26,231; Referee: Christian Dingert

13 February 2016 21	Werder Bremen	1–1	1899 Hoffenheim	Bremen
15:30 CET (UTC+01:00)	Djilobodji 13'; S. García (yellow card) 56'	Report	Kramarić 10', (yellow card) 49' (yellow-red card) 77'; Volland (yellow card) 45'; Schmid (yellow card) 73'; Vargas (yellow card) 90+2'	Stadium: Weserstadion; Attendance: 38,454; Referee: Benjamin Brand

20 February 2016 22	1899 Hoffenheim	3–2	Mainz 05	Sinsheim
15:30 CET (UTC+01:00)	Amiri 13'; Rudy (yellow card) 14'; Uth 68', 76'	Report	Córdoba 11'; Balogun (yellow card) 27'; Jairo 78', (yellow card) 90+1'	Stadium: Wirsol Rhein-Neckar-Arena; Attendance: 24,019; Referee: Günter Perl

28 February 2016 23	Borussia Dortmund	3–1	1899 Hoffenheim	Dortmund
17:30 CET (UTC+01:00)	Mkhitaryan 80'; Ramos 85'; Aubameyang 90+2'	Report	Rudy 25', (red card) 58'	Stadium: Signal Iduna Park; Attendance: 81,359; Referee: Peter Sippel

2 March 2016 24	1899 Hoffenheim	2–1	FC Augsburg	Sinsheim
20:00 CET (UTC+01:00)	Volland 25', (yellow card) 62'; Süle (yellow card) 39'; Uth 81'	Report	Caiuby (yellow card) 22'; Verhaegh (yellow card) 34', (goal) 40' (pen.); Hitz (yellow card) 62'; Klavan (yellow card) 90+2'	Stadium: Wirsol Rhein-Neckar-Arena; Attendance: 21,092; Referee: Guido Winkmann

5 March 2016 25	VfB Stuttgart	5–1	1899 Hoffenheim	Stuttgart
15:30 CET (UTC+01:00)	Niedermeier 5', 51'; Kravets (yellow card) 14'; Rupp 42'; Kostić 78'; Werner 83'	Report	Süle (yellow card) 60'; Kramarić 73'; Polanski (yellow card) 80'	Stadium: Mercedes-Benz Arena; Attendance: 47,677; Referee: Christian Dingert

12 March 2016 26	1899 Hoffenheim	1–0	VfL Wolfsburg	Sinsheim
15:30 CET (UTC+01:00)	Kramarić 3'; Baumann (yellow card) 89'	Report	Casteels (yellow card) 56'	Stadium: Wirsol Rhein-Neckar-Arena; Attendance: 25,231; Referee: Robert Hartmann

19 March 2016 27	Hamburger SV	1–3	1899 Hoffenheim	Hamburg
15:30 CET (UTC+01:00)	Adler (yellow card) 19'; Hunt 30' (pen.); Ostrzolek (yellow card) 35'; Holtby (yellow card) 70'	Report	Kramarić 20' (pen.); Volland 23'; Kadeřábek (yellow card) 49'; Vargas 67'	Stadium: Volksparkstadion; Attendance: 48,263; Referee: Knut Kircher

3 April 2016 28	1899 Hoffenheim	1–1	1. FC Köln	Sinsheim
17:30 CEST (UTC+02:00)	Amiri (yellow card) 7'; Rudy (yellow card) 39'; Volland 90+1'	Report	Zoller 69', (yellow card) 72'	Stadium: Wirsol Rhein-Neckar-Arena; Attendance: 30,150; Referee: Deniz Aytekin

9 April 2016 29	Eintracht Frankfurt	0–2	1899 Hoffenheim	Frankfurt
15:30 CEST (UTC+02:00)	Seferovic (yellow card) 67'; Abraham (yellow card) 75'; Ayhan (yellow card) 88'	Report	Amiri 62'; Süle (yellow card) 68'; Uth (yellow card) 71', (goal) 90'; Rudy (yellow card) 76'; Strobl (yellow card) 78'	Stadium: Commerzbank-Arena; Attendance: 51,000; Referee: Felix Brych

16 April 2016 30	1899 Hoffenheim	2–1	Hertha BSC	Sinsheim
15:30 CEST (UTC+02:00)	Polanski (yellow card) 26'; Schär 33'; Kadeřábek (yellow card) 80'; Uth 85'	Report	Stark 26'	Stadium: Wirsol Rhein-Neckar-Arena; Attendance: 27,745; Referee: Guido Winkmann

24 April 2016 31	Borussia Mönchengladbach	3–1	1899 Hoffenheim	Mönchengladbach
15:30 CEST (UTC+02:00)	Toljan 7' (o.g.); Dahoud 45'; Hahn 61'; Nordtveit (yellow card) 70'	Report	Rudy (yellow card) 20'; Polanski (yellow card) 40'; Kramarić 54'	Stadium: Stadion im Borussia-Park; Attendance: 53,144; Referee: Robert Hartmann

30 April 2016 32	1899 Hoffenheim	2–1	FC Ingolstadt	Sinsheim
15:30 CEST (UTC+02:00)	Rudy (yellow card) 16'; Uth 37'; Strobl (yellow card) 60'; Amiri 84', (yellow card) 85'	Report	Hübner (yellow card) 15'; Lex 17'; Bauer (yellow card) 34'; Groß (yellow card) 62'; Leckie (yellow card) 90+3'	Stadium: Wirsol Rhein-Neckar-Arena; Attendance: 26,561; Referee: Bastian Dankert

7 May 2016 33	Hannover 96	1–0	1899 Hoffenheim	Hanover
15:30 CEST (UTC+02:00)	Sané (yellow card) 26'; Kiyotake 28'; Anton (yellow card) 54'; Prib (yellow card) 82'	Report	Polanski (yellow card) 10'; Volland (yellow card) 41'	Stadium: HDI-Arena; Attendance: 38,096; Referee: Wolfgang Stark

14 May 2016 34	1899 Hoffenheim	1–4	Schalke 04	Sinsheim
15:30 CEST (UTC+02:00)	Uth 41'; Rudy (yellow card) 59'	Report	Huntelaar 7'; Choupo-Moting 14'; Sané 56'; Höwedes (yellow card) 68'; Schär 89' (o.g.)	Stadium: Wirsol Rhein-Neckar-Arena; Attendance: 30,150; Referee: Felix Brych

=== DFB-Pokal ===
8 August 2015 Round 1	1860 Munich	2–0	1899 Hoffenheim	Munich
18:00 CEST (UTC+02:00)	Degenek (yellow card) 48'; Claasen 51'; Mulić 90+3', (yellow card) 90+3'	Report	Toljan (yellow card) 37'; Volland (yellow card) 50'	Stadium: Allianz Arena; Attendance: 17,800; Referee: Harm Osmers
