= Eugen Polanski =

Polish footballer (born 1986)

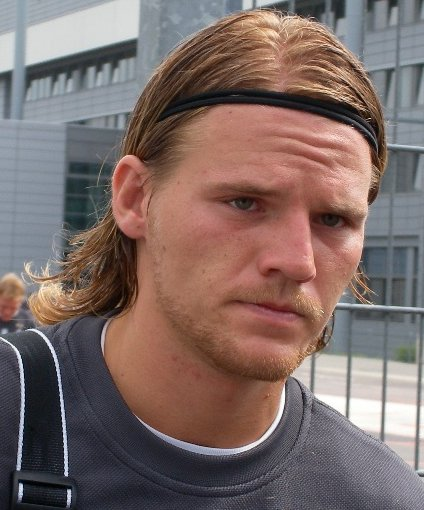
- Polański in 2007

Personal information
- Birth name: Bogusław Eugeniusz Polański
- Date of birth: 17 March 1986 (age 40)
- Place of birth: Sosnowiec, Poland
- Height: 1.83 m (6 ft 0 in)
- Position: Defensive midfielder

Youth career
- Concordia Viersen
- 1994–2004: Borussia Mönchengladbach

Senior career*
Years	Team	Apps	(Gls)
2004–2008	Borussia Mönchengladbach	53	(1)
2008–2010	Getafe	26	(0)
2009–2010	→ Mainz 05 (loan)	21	(1)
2010–2013	Mainz 05	66	(3)
2011	Mainz 05 II	1	(0)
2013–2018	1899 Hoffenheim	123	(9)
Total		290	(14)

International career
2005–2008	Germany U21	19	(1)
2011–2014	Poland	18	(0)

Managerial career
- 2022–2025: Borussia Mönchengladbach II
- 2025–2026: Borussia Mönchengladbach
- * Club domestic league appearances and goals

Eugen Polanski (Polish pronunciation: [ˈɔjɡɛn pɔˈlanskʲi]; (Note: German pronunciation: [ˈɔʏɡeːn poˈlanski, ˈɔʏɡn̩ -].) born Bogusław Eugeniusz Polański (Note: Polish: [bɔˈɡuswaf ɛwˈɡɛɲuʂ pɔˈlaj̃skʲi], German: [boˈɡʊsu̯af ʔɛʊˈɡɛni̯ʊʃ poˈlanski].) on 17 March 1986) is a Polish professional football manager and former player who played mainly as a defensive midfielder. He last coached Bundesliga club Borussia Mönchengladbach.

He amassed Bundesliga totals of 254 matches and 14 goals over 12 seasons, in representation of Borussia Mönchengladbach, Mainz 05 and Hoffenheim. He also competed in the Spanish La Liga, with Getafe.

A former youth international for Germany, Polanski represented Poland at senior level, and featured for them at the UEFA Euro 2012.

== Club career ==
Born in Sosnowiec, Poland, Polanski moved to Germany as an infant, joining Borussia Mönchengladbach's youth ranks at the age of eight. In the 2004–05 season, on 12 February 2005, he made his debut both in the first team and the Bundesliga, in a 2–0 away loss against Werder Bremen that was his sole appearance of the season.

Polanski scored his first goal as a professional in a 1–1 home draw against Bayer Leverkusen on 19 November 2005, and went on to be relatively played the following years. In the 2007–08 season, however, as the campaign ended in promotion, he only featured in nine second division matches.

After his contract at Borussia expired in June 2008, Polanski agreed a move to La Liga with Getafe. During his first and only season, as the Madrid side finished just one place above the relegation zone, he was first choice, often partnering Javier Casquero in central midfield.

On 12 June 2009, Polanski was loaned out to Mainz 05 on a season-long spell. However, the following month, the deal was extended for another year, with the clubs reaching an agreement for a permanent switch in early November 2010.

On 25 January 2013, Polanski joined fellow top division team 1899 Hoffenheim, penning a deal until June 2015.

== International career ==
Polanski appeared for Germany at various youth levels, often as captain. He was a key member of the under-21s at the 2006 UEFA European Championship, scoring a magnificent long-range goal in the fixture against Serbia and Montenegro; his form made Monaco enquire about his services, but Mönchengladbach promptly rejected the offer.

In May 2011, Polanski confirmed his intent to play for Poland. On 26 July, he was called up by manager Franciszek Smuda for a friendly with Georgia, making his debut in the game which took place on 10 August.

Polanski was selected as part of the 23-man squad that competed in the finals played on home soil and Ukraine. He appeared in three games during the tournament, in an eventual group stage exit.

== Managerial career ==
Polanski was appointed as a youth coach at Borussia Mönchengladbach in summer 2019. In May 2022, Borussia Mönchengladbach II manager Heiko Vogel left the club and Polanski was appointed as his successor. In January 2024, Polanski extended his contract as Borussia Mönchengladbach II head coach until summer 2026.

On 15 September 2025, Borussia Mönchengladbach's first team head coach Gerardo Seoane was sacked, following 10 Bundesliga matches without a win, and Polanski was appointed as manager on a temporary basis. In his first match as manager, the club picked up a 1–1 draw away to Bayer Leverkusen after Haris Tabaković scored Gladbach's first Bundesliga goal of the season – a 93rd minute penalty. He picked up his first Bundesliga win in his sixth match as manager with a 4–0 win over FC St. Pauli. On 18 November, Polanski was appointed on a permanent basis on a deal until June 2028. He was sacked in September 2026.

== Career statistics ==
=== Club ===
Appearances and goals by club, season and competition
Club	Season	League			National cup (Note: Includes DFB-Pokal, Copa del Rey)		Continental		Other		Total	
Club	Season	League	Apps	Goals	Apps	Goals	Apps	Goals	Apps	Goals	Apps	Goals
Borussia Mönchengladbach	2004–05	Bundesliga	1	0	0	0	—		—		1	0
Borussia Mönchengladbach	2005–06	Bundesliga	21	1	1	0	—		—		22	1
Borussia Mönchengladbach	2006–07	Bundesliga	22	0	0	0	—		—		22	0
Borussia Mönchengladbach	2007–08	2. Bundesliga	9	0	0	0	—		—		9	0
Borussia Mönchengladbach	Total		53	1	1	0	—		—		54	1
Getafe	2008–09	La Liga	26	0	2	0	—		—		28	0
Mainz 05 (loan)	2009–10	Bundesliga	21	1	0	0	—		—		21	1
Mainz 05	2010–11	Bundesliga	28	0	1	0	—		—		29	0
Mainz 05	2011–12	Bundesliga	26	3	0	0	2 (Note: Appearances in UEFA Europa League)	0	—		28	3
Mainz 05	2012–13	Bundesliga	12	0	1	0	—		—		13	0
Mainz 05	Total		66	3	2	0	2	0	—		70	3
Mainz 05 II	2011–12	Regionalliga West	1	0	—		—		—		1	0
1899 Hoffenheim	2012–13	Bundesliga	11	0	0	0	—		2 (Note: Appearances in relegation play-offs)	0	13	0
1899 Hoffenheim	2013–14	Bundesliga	32	3	4	0	—		—		36	3
1899 Hoffenheim	2014–15	Bundesliga	30	5	3	1	—		—		33	6
1899 Hoffenheim	2015–16	Bundesliga	27	1	1	0	—		—		28	1
1899 Hoffenheim	2016–17	Bundesliga	14	0	0	0	—		—		14	0
1899 Hoffenheim	2017–18	Bundesliga	9	0	1	0	4	0	—		14	0
1899 Hoffenheim	Total		123	9	9	1	4	0	2	0	138	10
Career total			290	14	14	1	6	0	2	0	312	15

=== International ===
Appearances and goals by national team and year
National team	Year	Apps	Goals
Poland
Poland	2011	3	0
Poland	2012	12	0
Poland	2013	2	0
Poland	2014	1	0
Total		18	0

== Managerial statistics ==
As of match played 12 September 2026

Managerial record by team and tenure
Team	From	To	Record							
Team	From	To	G	W	D	L	GF	GA	GD	Win %
Borussia Mönchengladbach II	1 July 2022	15 September 2025	108	49	28	31	197	164	+33	45.37
Borussia Mönchengladbach	15 September 2025	13 September 2026	37	11	10	16	54	63	−9	29.73
Total			145	60	38	47	251	227	+24	41.38
