= Marco Terrazzino =

German footballer

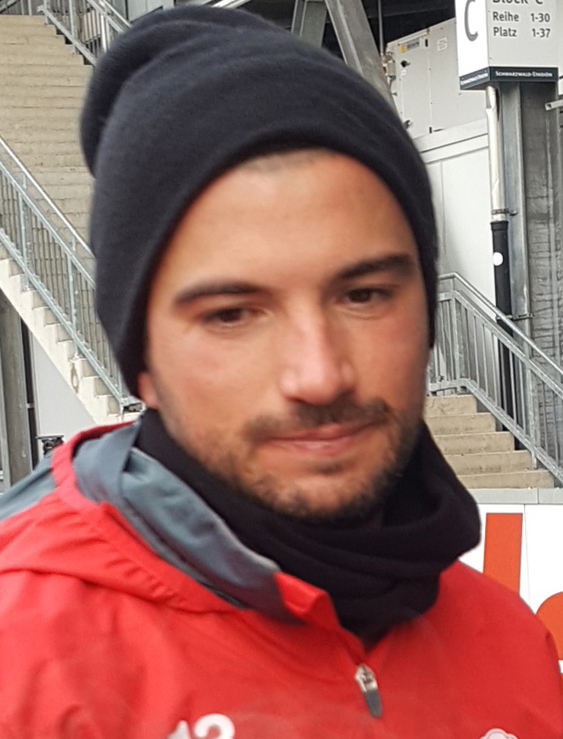
- Terrazzino in 2019

Personal information
- Date of birth: 15 April 1991 (age 35)
- Place of birth: Mannheim, Germany
- Positions: Left winger; attacking midfielder

Team information
- Current team: Wuppertaler SV
- Number: 10

Youth career
- TSV Neckarau
- –2007: VfL Neckarau
- 2007–2009: 1899 Hoffenheim

Senior career*
Years	Team	Apps	(Gls)
2009–2011	1899 Hoffenheim	19	(0)
2010	1899 Hoffenheim II	20	(3)
2011–2012	Karlsruher SC	36	(3)
2012–2014	SC Freiburg	8	(2)
2012–2014	SC Freiburg II	13	(4)
2014–2016	VfL Bochum	60	(10)
2016–2017	1899 Hoffenheim	9	(1)
2016	1899 Hoffenheim II	3	(3)
2017–2020	SC Freiburg	37	(1)
2019	SC Freiburg II	2	(0)
2020	→ Dynamo Dresden (loan)	14	(2)
2020–2021	SC Paderborn	21	(1)
2021–2023	Lechia Gdańsk	49	(5)
2023–	Wuppertaler SV	41	(5)

International career
2009	Germany U18	5	(0)
2009–2010	Germany U19	4	(3)
2010–2012	Germany U20	6	(1)
- * Club domestic league appearances and goals as of 1 January 2025

Marco Terrazzino (born 15 April 1991) is a German professional footballer who plays as a left winger or attacking midfielder for Wuppertaler SV.

== Club career ==
Terrazzino began his career with TSV Neckarau before moving to VfL Neckarau and subsequently joining TSG 1899 Hoffenheim in July 2007. He made his debut during the 2008–09 Bundesliga season, in January 2009. In January 2011 he transferred to Karlsruher SC along with Hoffenheim teammate Pascal Groß. On 22 May 2012, he joined the SC Freiburg squad.

On 20 June 2014, he joined VfL Bochum. On 18 May 2016, Terrazzino signed for his former club Hoffenheim on a two-year deal.

After making just 9 league appearances during the 2016–17 season for Hoffenheim, he signed for Freiburg for a fee rumoured to be €2.5 million. On 3 January 2020, Terrazzino signed for 2. Bundesliga club Dynamo Dresden on loan.

Terrazzino joined SC Paderborn 07 in October 2020, newly relegated to the 2. Bundesliga, after his contract with SC Freiburg had been terminated. He signed a one-year contract.

In August 2021 he signed for Polish club Lechia Gdańsk.

On 18 September 2023, he signed a contract with Wuppertaler SV in Regionalliga West.

== International career ==
Terrazzino was born in Germany to Italian parents from Sicily. He was a youth international for Germany.

== Career statistics ==
As of 4 June 2018

Appearances and goals by club, season and competition
Club	Season	League			DFB-Pokal		Other		Total	
Club	Season	Division	Apps	Goals	Apps	Goals	Apps	Goals	Apps	Goals
1899 Hoffenheim	2008–09	Bundesliga	11	0	0	0	—		11	0
1899 Hoffenheim	2009–10	Bundesliga	8	0	2	0	—		10	0
1899 Hoffenheim	2010–11	Bundesliga	0	0	0	0	—		0	0
1899 Hoffenheim	Total		19	0	2	0	0	0	21	0
1899 Hoffenheim II	2010–11	Regionalliga Süd	20	3	—		—		20	3
Karlsruher SC	2010–11	2. Bundesliga	11	1	0	0	—		11	1
Karlsruher SC	2011–12	2. Bundesliga	25	2	2	0	2 (Note: Appearances in the 2. Bundesliga relegation play-offs)	0	29	2
Karlsruher SC	Total		36	3	2	0	2	0	40	3
SC Freiburg	2012–13	Bundesliga	6	1	0	0	—		6	1
SC Freiburg	2013–14	Bundesliga	2	1	0	0	—		2	1
SC Freiburg	Total		8	2	0	0	0	0	8	1
SC Freiburg II	2012–13	Regionalliga Südwest	10	4	—		—		10	4
SC Freiburg II	2013–14	Regionalliga Südwest	3	0	—		—		3	0
SC Freiburg II	Total		13	4	—		0	0	13	4
VfL Bochum	2014–15	2. Bundesliga	29	5	2	0	—		31	5
VfL Bochum	2015–16	2. Bundesliga	31	5	3	2	—		34	7
VfL Bochum	Total		60	10	5	2	0	0	65	12
1899 Hoffenheim II	2016–17	Regionalliga Südwest	3	3	—		—		3	3
1899 Hoffenheim	2016–17	Bundesliga	9	1	1	0	—		10	1
SC Freiburg	2017–18	Bundesliga	24	0	2	0	0	0	26	0
SC Freiburg	2018–19	Bundesliga	13	1	1	0	0	0	14	1
SC Freiburg	Total		37	1	3	0	0	0	40	1
Career total			205	27	13	2	2	0	220	29
