= 2016–17 TSG 1899 Hoffenheim season =

1899 Hoffenheim
2016–17 season
- Owner: President
- Chairman: Peter Görlich; Frank Briel
- Manager: Julian Nagelsmann
- Stadium: WIRSOL Rhein-Neckar-Arena
- Bundesliga: 4th
- DFB-Pokal: Second round
- Top goalscorer: League: Andrej Kramarić (15 goals); All: Andrej Kramarić (18 goals)
- Biggest win: Egestorf/Langreder 0–6 Hoffenheim
- Biggest defeat: Köln 2–1 (a.e.t.) Hoffenheim; Dortmund 2–1 Hoffenheim
Home colours	Away colours	Third colours

The 2016–17 TSG 1899 Hoffenheim season is the 118th season in the football club's history and 9th consecutive and overall season in the top flight of German football, the Bundesliga, having been promoted from the 2. Bundesliga in 2008. 1899 Hoffenheim will also participate in this season's edition of the domestic cup, the DFB-Pokal. It is the 8th season for Hoffenheim in the WIRSOL Rhein-Neckar-Arena, located in Sinsheim, Germany. The season covers a period from 1 July 2016 to 30 June 2017.

== Players ==
=== Squad ===
Note: Flags indicate national team as defined under FIFA eligibility rules; some limited exceptions apply. Players may hold more than one non-FIFA nationality.

No.	Pos.	Nation	Player
1	GK	GER	Oliver Baumann
3	DF	CZE	Pavel Kadeřábek
4	DF	BIH	Ermin Bičakčić
5	DF	SUI	Fabian Schär
6	MF	GER	Sebastian Rudy
7	MF	GER	Lukas Rupp
8	MF	POL	Eugen Polanski (captain)
12	DF	BRA	Danilo Soares
13	MF	TUR	Kerem Demirbay
14	FW	GER	Sandro Wagner
15	DF	GER	Jeremy Toljan
16	MF	SUI	Pirmin Schwegler
17	MF	SUI	Steven Zuber

No.	Pos.	Nation	Player
18	MF	GER	Nadiem Amiri
19	FW	GER	Mark Uth
21	DF	GER	Benjamin Hübner
22	MF	GER	Kevin Vogt
23	FW	GER	Marco Terrazzino
25	DF	GER	Niklas Süle
27	FW	CRO	Andrej Kramarić
28	FW	HUN	Ádám Szalai
30	FW	GER	Philipp Ochs
32	MF	GER	Dennis Geiger
33	GK	GER	Alexander Stolz
36	GK	SUI	Gregor Kobel

== Competitions ==
Win Draw Loss

=== Overview ===
Competition	First match	Last match	Starting round	Final position	Record							
Competition	First match	Last match	Starting round	Final position	Pld	W	D	L	GF	GA	GD	Win %
Bundesliga	28 August 2016	20 May 2017	Matchday 1	4th	34	16	14	4	64	37	+27	47.06
DFB-Pokal	21 August 2016	26 October 2016	First round	Second round	2	1	0	1	7	2	+5	50.00
Total					36	17	14	5	71	39	+32	47.22

Last updated: 27 May 2017
Source: Competitions

=== Bundesliga ===
==== League table ====
Pos	Team	Pld	W	D	L	GF	GA	GD	Pts	Qualification or relegation
2	RB Leipzig	34	20	7	7	66	39	+27	67	Qualification for the Champions League group stage
3	Borussia Dortmund	34	18	10	6	72	40	+32	64	Qualification for the Champions League group stage
4	1899 Hoffenheim	34	16	14	4	64	37	+27	62	Qualification for the Champions League play-off round
5	1. FC Köln	34	12	13	9	51	42	+9	49	Qualification for the Europa League group stage (Note: Since the winners of the 2016–17 DFB-Pokal, Borussia Dortmund, qualified for the Champions League based on league position, the Europa League group stage spot was passed to the sixth-placed team, Hertha BSC; and the Europa League third qualifying round spot was passed to the seventh-placed team, SC Freiburg.)
6	Hertha BSC	34	15	4	15	43	47	−4	49	Qualification for the Europa League group stage

Source: DFB
Rules for classification: 1) Points; 2) Goal difference; 3) Goals scored; 4) Head-to-head points; 5) Head-to-head goal difference; 6) Head-to-head away goals scored; 7) Away goals scored; 8) Play-off.

==== Results summary ====
Overall								Home						Away					
Pld	W	D	L	GF	GA	GD	Pts	W	D	L	GF	GA	GD	W	D	L	GF	GA	GD
34	16	14	4	64	37	+27	62	11	6	0	35	14	+21	5	8	4	29	23	+6

Last updated: 27 May 2017.
Source: Bundesliga

==== Results by round ====
Round	1	2	3	4	5	6	7	8	9	10	11	12	13	14	15	16	17	18	19	20	21	22	23	24	25	26	27	28	29	30	31	32	33	34
Ground	H	A	H	A	H	A	H	A	H	A	H	A	H	A	H	H	A	A	H	A	H	A	H	A	H	A	H	A	H	A	H	A	A	H
Result	D	D	D	D	W	W	W	W	W	D	D	D	W	D	D	D	W	L	W	L	W	D	W	D	W	W	W	L	W	D	W	L	W	D
Position	8	13	10	11	9	7	6	4	3	3	5	6	4	4	3	5	3	5	5	5	4	4	4	4	4	3	3	3	3	4	3	4	4	4

Updated to match(es) played on 27 May 2017. Source: Bundesliga
A = Away; H = Home; W = Win; D = Draw; L = Loss

==== Matches ====
28 August 2016 1	1899 Hoffenheim	2–2	RB Leipzig	Sinsheim
17:30 CEST (UTC+2)	Vogt (yellow card) 22'; Schär (yellow card) 51'; Rupp 55'; Uth 83'	Report	Orban (yellow card) 20'; Compper (yellow card) 54'; Kaiser 58'; Ilsanker (yellow card) 74'; Demme (yellow card) 79'; Sabitzer 90'	Stadium: WIRSOL Rhein-Neckar-Arena; Attendance: 24,188; Referee: Tobias Stieler

11 September 2016 2	Mainz 05	4–4	1899 Hoffenheim	Mainz
17:30 CEST (UTC+2)	de Blasis 3', 23', (yellow card) 45+2'; Córdoba 27'; Öztunalı 43'; Bussmann (red card) 57'	Report	Wagner 39', (yellow card) 60'; Uth (yellow card) 67', (goal) 71', 72'; Szalai 84'; Rupp (yellow card) 86'	Stadium: OPEL ARENA; Attendance: 27,408; Referee: Markus Schmidt

17 September 2016 3	1899 Hoffenheim	0–0	VfL Wolfsburg	Sinsheim
15:30 CEST (UTC+2)	Wagner (yellow card) 20'; Rudy (yellow card) 78'	Report	Gerhardt (yellow card) 11'	Stadium: WIRSOL Rhein-Neckar-Arena; Attendance: 23,295; Referee: Günter Perl

20 September 2016 4	Darmstadt 98	1–1	1899 Hoffenheim	Darmstadt
20:00 CEST (UTC+2)	Jungwirth (yellow card) 77'; Oliynyk 90+2'	Report	Kramarić 46'; Vargas (yellow card) 83'	Stadium: Jonathan-Heimes-Stadion am Böllenfalltor; Attendance: 15,800; Referee: Frank Willenborg

25 September 2016 5	1899 Hoffenheim	2–1	Schalke 04	Sinsheim
15:30 CEST (UTC+2)	Kramarić 17'; Bičakčić (yellow card) 26'; Rupp 41'	Report	Choupo-Moting 4'; Di Santo (yellow card) 90+6'	Stadium: WIRSOL Rhein-Neckar-Arena; Attendance: 29,288; Referee: Tobias Welz

1 October 2016 6	FC Ingolstadt	1–2	1899 Hoffenheim	Ingolstadt
15:30 CEST (UTC+2)	Matip (yellow card) 58'; Hinterseer 90+5' (pen.)	Report	Wagner 11'; Demirbay 35'; Hübner (yellow card) 72'; Rupp (yellow card) 90+4'	Stadium: Audi Sportpark; Attendance: 13,844; Referee: Robert Kampka

15 October 2016 7	1899 Hoffenheim	2–1	SC Freiburg	Sinsheim
15:30 CEST (UTC+2)	Wagner 34'; Vogt (yellow card) 54'; Rudy (yellow card) 70'; Kramarić 81' (pen.)	Report	Torrejón (yellow card) 65'; Niederlechner 77'; Haberer (yellow card) 90+3'; Söyüncü (yellow card) 90+4'	Stadium: WIRSOL Rhein-Neckar-Arena; Attendance: 28,540; Referee: Deniz Aytekin

22 October 2016 8	Bayer Leverkusen	0–3	1899 Hoffenheim	Leverkusen
15:30 CEST (UTC+2)	Volland (red card) 6'	Report	Demirbay 15'; Rudy (yellow card) 45+1'; Wagner 49'; Zuber 60'	Stadium: BayArena; Attendance: 28,716; Referee: Bastian Dankert

30 October 2016 9	1899 Hoffenheim	1–0	Hertha BSC	Sinsheim
15:30 CET (UTC+1)	Süle 31'	Report	Weiser (yellow card) 62'; Stark (yellow card) 69'; Allan (yellow card) 75'; Schieber (yellow card) 84'	Stadium: WIRSOL Rhein-Neckar-Arena; Attendance: 28,015; Referee: Benjamin Cortus

5 November 2016 10	Bayern Munich	1–1	1899 Hoffenheim	Munich
15:30 CET (UTC+1)	Zuber 34' (o.g.)	Report	Demirbay 16'; Rudy (yellow card) 56'; Bičakčić (yellow card) 90'	Stadium: Allianz Arena; Attendance: 75,000; Referee: Markus Schmidt

20 November 2016 11	1899 Hoffenheim	2–2	Hamburger SV	Sinsheim
15:30 CET (UTC+1)	Bičakčić (yellow card) 40'; Wagner 45+1'; Zuber 49'	Report	Sakai (yellow card) 16'; Kostić 28'; Müller (yellow card) 42', (goal) 61'	Stadium: WIRSOL Rhein-Neckar-Arena; Attendance: 29,512; Referee: Robert Hartmann

26 November 2016 12	Borussia Mönchengladbach	1–1	1899 Hoffenheim	Mönchengladbach
15:30 CET (UTC+1)	Dahoud 25'	Report	Amiri 53'; Uth (yellow card) 67'; Kadeřábek (yellow card) 77'	Stadium: BORUSSIA-PARK; Attendance: 51,086; Referee: Deniz Aytekin

3 December 2016 13	1899 Hoffenheim	4–0	1. FC Köln	Sinsheim
15:30 CET (UTC+1)	Wagner 8', 67'; Toljan 39', (yellow card) 71'; Uth 89'	Report	Mavraj (yellow card) 84'	Stadium: WIRSOL Rhein-Neckar-Arena; Attendance: 29,740; Referee: Günter Perl

9 December 2016 14	Eintracht Frankfurt	0–0	1899 Hoffenheim	Frankfurt
20:30 CET (UTC+1)	Fabián (yellow card) 52'; Chandler (yellow card) 73' (red card) 82'; Mascarell (yellow card) 77'; Oczipka (yellow card) 82'; Rebić (yellow card) 87'	Report	Polanski (yellow card) 68'; Uth (yellow card) 82'; Wagner (yellow card) 88'	Stadium: Commerzbank-Arena; Attendance: 47,000; Referee: Christian Dingert

16 December 2016 15	1899 Hoffenheim	2–2	Borussia Dortmund	Sinsheim
20:30 CET (UTC+1)	Uth 3'; Wagner 20'; Süle (yellow card) 30'; Hübner (yellow card) 39'; Demirbay (yellow card) 58'; Rudy (yellow card) 86'; Vogt (yellow card) 86'	Report	Reus (yellow card) 9' (yellow-red card) 41'; Götze 11'; Bartra (yellow card) 27'; Aubameyang 48'	Stadium: WIRSOL Rhein-Neckar-Arena; Attendance: 30,150; Referee: Benjamin Brand

21 December 2016 16	1899 Hoffenheim	1–1	Werder Bremen	Sinsheim
20:00 CET (UTC+1)	Wagner 26'; Hübner (yellow card) 77'; Schwegler (yellow card) 90+2'	Report	S. García (yellow card) 53'; Bartels (yellow card) 73'; Gnabry 87'	Stadium: WIRSOL Rhein-Neckar-Arena; Attendance: 29,076; Referee: Benjamin Cortus

21 January 2017 17	FC Augsburg	0–2	1899 Hoffenheim	Augsburg
15:30 CET (UTC+1)	Stafylidis (yellow card) 10'; Koo (yellow card) 39'; Kohr (yellow card) 50'	Report	Demirbay (yellow card) 15'; Ochs (yellow card) 21'; Süle (yellow card) 36'; Wagner 47'; Kramarić 64'; Schär (yellow card) 90'	Stadium: WWK ARENA; Attendance: 24,515; Referee: Markus Schmidt

28 January 2017 18	RB Leipzig	2–1	1899 Hoffenheim	Leipzig
15:30 CET (UTC+1)	Poulsen (yellow card) 35'; Werner 38'; Sabitzer 77'; Compper (yellow card) 84'; Selke (yellow card) 90+2'	Report	Amiri 18', (yellow card) 25'; Wagner (red card) 60'; Szalai (yellow card) 88'; Hübner (yellow card) 90'	Stadium: Red Bull Arena; Attendance: 39,633; Referee: Wolfgang Stark

4 February 2017 19	1899 Hoffenheim	4–0	Mainz 05	Sinsheim
15:30 CET (UTC+1)	Uth 5'; Baumann (yellow card) 51'; Kadeřábek (yellow card) 59'; Terrazzino 81'; Szalai 86', 90+1'	Report	Córdoba (yellow card) 37'; Öztunalı (yellow card) 90'	Stadium: WIRSOL Rhein-Neckar-Arena; Attendance: 26,078; Referee: Guido Winkmann

12 February 2017 20	VfL Wolfsburg	2–1	1899 Hoffenheim	Wolfsburg
15:30 CET (UTC+1)	Rodríguez (yellow card) 14'; Bazoer (yellow card) 24'; Arnold 50'; Didavi 73'; Mallı (yellow card) 75'	Report	Zuber 26'; Vogt (yellow card) 87'; Hübner (yellow card) 87'	Stadium: VOLKSWAGEN ARENA; Attendance: 23,148; Referee: Daniel Siebert

18 February 2017 21	1899 Hoffenheim	2–0	Darmstadt 98	Sinsheim
15:30 CET (UTC+1)	Demirbay (yellow card) 22'; Kramarić 64', 90+3' (pen.); Bičakčić (yellow card) 75'; Rudy (yellow card) 78'	Report	Sam (yellow card) 76'; Sirigu (yellow card) 80'; Niemeyer (yellow card) 86'; Altıntop (yellow card) 90+2'	Stadium: WIRSOL Rhein-Neckar-Arena; Attendance: 29,013; Referee: Felix Brych

26 February 2017 22	Schalke 04	1–1	1899 Hoffenheim	Gelsenkirchen
17:30 CET (UTC+1)	Schöpf 5'	Report	Süle (yellow card) 67'; Hübner (yellow card) 69'; Rudy 79'	Stadium: VELTINS-Arena; Attendance: 58,839; Referee: Deniz Aytekin

4 March 2017 23	1899 Hoffenheim	5–2	FC Ingolstadt	Sinsheim
15:30 CET (UTC+1)	Rudy 17', (yellow card) 34'; Hübner (yellow card) 58', (goal) 88'; Szalai 62', 79'; Kramarić 77'	Report	Cohen 38'; Süle 60' (o.g.); Suttner (yellow card) 65'; Kittel (yellow card) 84'	Stadium: WIRSOL Rhein-Neckar-Arena; Attendance: 23,028; Referee: Bastian Dankert

11 March 2017 24	SC Freiburg	1–1	1899 Hoffenheim	Freiburg im Breisgau
15:30 CET (UTC+1)	Höfler (yellow card) 5'; Philipp 56'; Haberer (yellow card) 61'	Report	Vogt (yellow card) 56'; Kramarić 60'; Hübner (yellow card) 62'	Stadium: Schwarzwald-Stadion; Attendance: 24,000; Referee: Wolfgang Stark

18 March 2017 25	1899 Hoffenheim	1–0	Bayer Leverkusen	Sinsheim
15:30 CET (UTC+1)	Szalai (yellow card) 26'; Wagner 62'	Report	Volland (yellow card) 23'	Stadium: WIRSOL Rhein-Neckar-Arena; Attendance: 28,117; Referee: Manuel Gräfe

31 March 2017 26	Hertha BSC	1–3	1899 Hoffenheim	Berlin
20:30 CEST (UTC+2)	Pekarík 32'; Mittelstädt (yellow card) 38' (yellow-red card) 58'; Ibišević (yellow card) 42'; Skjelbred (yellow card) 82'	Report	Kramarić 39' (pen.), 86'; Amiri (yellow card) 61'; Süle 76'	Stadium: Olympiastadion Berlin; Attendance: 42,401; Referee: Benjamin Brand

4 April 2017 27	1899 Hoffenheim	1–0	Bayern Munich	Sinsheim
20:00 CEST (UTC+2)	Kramarić 21'	Report	Lewandowski (yellow card) 64'	Stadium: WIRSOL Rhein-Neckar-Arena; Attendance: 30,150; Referee: Sascha Stegemann

8 April 2017 28	Hamburger SV	2–1	1899 Hoffenheim	Hamburg
15:30 CEST (UTC+2)	Hunt 25', 75'; Kostić (yellow card) 40'; Walace (yellow card) 51'; Papadopoulos (yellow card) 68'; Diekmeier (yellow card) 82'	Report	Rudy (yellow card) 32'; Kramarić 35' (pen.), (yellow card) 36'; Zuber (yellow card) 62'; Hübner (yellow card) 82'	Stadium: Volksparkstadion; Attendance: 53,565; Referee: Felix Zwayer

15 April 2017 29	1899 Hoffenheim	5–3	Borussia Mönchengladbach	Sinsheim
15:30 CEST (UTC+2)	Szalai 9', 24'; Hübner (yellow card) 30'; Demirbay 58', 89'; Vogt (yellow card) 64'; Uth 75'	Report	Stindl (yellow card) 26', (goal) 35'; Vestergaard 31'; Elvedi (yellow card) 45+1'; Christensen (yellow card) 48'; Dahoud (yellow card) 63', (goal) 78'	Stadium: WIRSOL Rhein-Neckar-Arena; Attendance: 30,150; Referee: Christian Dingert

21 April 2017 30	1. FC Köln	1–1	1899 Hoffenheim	Cologne
20:30 CEST (UTC+2)	Heintz (yellow card) 21'; Bittencourt 58'; Osako (yellow card) 90+2'	Report	Demirbay 90+3'	Stadium: RheinEnergieSTADION; Attendance: 49,600; Referee: Marco Fritz

30 April 2017 31	1899 Hoffenheim	1–0	Eintracht Frankfurt	Sinsheim
17:30 CEST (UTC+2)	Hübner 90'	Report	Abraham (yellow card) 55'; Russ (yellow card) 75'; Fabián (yellow card) 90+2'	Stadium: WIRSOL Rhein-Neckar-Arena; Attendance: 30,150; Referee: Günter Perl

6 May 2017 32	Borussia Dortmund	2–1	1899 Hoffenheim	Dortmund
15:30 CEST (UTC+2)	Reus 4', (yellow card) 11'; Castro (yellow card) 45+1'; Papastathopoulos (yellow card) 53'; Dembélé (yellow card) 57'; Aubameyang 82'	Report	Uth (yellow card) 15'; Demirbay (yellow card) 59'; Kramarić 86' (pen.)	Stadium: SIGNAL IDUNA PARK; Attendance: 81,360; Referee: Felix Brych

13 May 2017 33	Werder Bremen	3–5	1899 Hoffenheim	Bremen
15:30 CEST (UTC+2)	Gebre Selassie 59'; Bauer (yellow card) 80', (goal) 90'; Bargfrede 86'	Report	Szalai 7'; Kramarić 11', 49'; Süle (yellow card) 12'; Zuber 40'; Bičakčić 51'	Stadium: Weser-Stadion; Attendance: 41,000; Referee: Daniel Siebert

20 May 2017 34	1899 Hoffenheim	0–0	FC Augsburg	Sinsheim
15:30 CEST (UTC+2)	Rudy (yellow card) 45'; Zuber (yellow card) 55'	Report	Baier (yellow card) 45'	Stadium: WIRSOL Rhein-Neckar-Arena; Attendance: 30,150; Referee: Marco Fritz

=== DFB-Pokal ===
21 August 2016 First round	Germania Egestorf/Langreder	0–6	1899 Hoffenheim	Barsinghausen
15:30 CEST (UTC+2)	Dismer (yellow card) 54' (yellow-red card) 61'	Report	Kramarić 18', 32', 80'; Rudy 21'; Uth 43'; Wagner (yellow card) 54', (goal) 90'; Kadeřábek (yellow card) 60' (yellow-red card) 72'	Stadium: Joyetech-Arena; Attendance: 2,585; Referee: Marcel Schütz

26 October 2016 Second round	1. FC Köln	2–1 (a.e.t.)	1899 Hoffenheim	Cologne
20:45 CEST (UTC+2)	Risse 36'; Sørensen (yellow card) 90+2'; Modeste 91', (yellow card) 96'	Report	Hübner 8'; Demirbay (yellow card) 33'; Szalai (yellow card) 112'	Stadium: RheinEnergieSTADION; Attendance: 43,000; Referee: Marco Fritz

== Statistics ==
=== Appearances and goals ===
No.	Pos	Nat	Player	Total		Bundesliga		DFB-Pokal	
No.	Pos	Nat	Player	Apps	Goals	Apps	Goals	Apps	Goals
Goalkeepers
1	GK	(Germany) GER	Oliver Baumann	36	0	34	0	2	0
33	GK	(Germany) GER	Alexander Stolz	0	0	0	0	0	0
36	GK	(Switzerland) SUI	Gregor Kobel	0	0	0	0	0	0
Defenders
3	DF	(Czech Republic) CZE	Pavel Kadeřábek	24	0	22+1	0	1	0
4	DF	(Bosnia and Herzegovina) BIH	Ermin Bičakčić	19	1	11+7	1	1	0
5	DF	(Switzerland) SUI	Fabian Schär	7	0	3+3	0	1	0
12	DF	(Brazil) BRA	Danilo Soares	0	0	0	0	0	0
15	DF	(Germany) GER	Jeremy Toljan	21	1	14+6	1	0+1	0
21	DF	(Germany) GER	Benjamin Hübner	26	3	25	2	1	1
25	DF	(Germany) GER	Niklas Süle	34	2	33	2	1	0
Midfielders
6	MF	(Germany) GER	Sebastian Rudy	34	3	32	2	2	1
7	MF	(Germany) GER	Lukas Rupp	16	2	8+6	2	1+1	0
8	MF	(Poland) POL	Eugen Polanski	14	0	7+7	0	0	0
11	MF	(Sweden) SWE	Jiloan Hamad	0	0	0	0	0	0
13	MF	(Germany) GER	Kerem Demirbay	29	6	27+1	6	1	0
16	MF	(Switzerland) SUI	Pirmin Schwegler	10	0	2+7	0	1	0
17	MF	(Switzerland) SUI	Steven Zuber	26	4	23+1	4	2	0
18	MF	(Germany) GER	Nadiem Amiri	33	2	20+12	2	1	0
22	MF	(Germany) GER	Kevin Vogt	33	0	30+1	0	2	0
30	MF	(Germany) GER	Philipp Ochs	4	0	2+1	0	0+1	0
32	MF	(Germany) GER	Dennis Geiger	0	0	0	0	0	0
Forwards
14	FW	(Germany) GER	Sandro Wagner	33	12	30+1	11	2	1
19	FW	(Germany) GER	Mark Uth	23	8	12+10	7	1	1
23	FW	(Germany) GER	Marco Terrazzino	9	1	4+4	1	0+1	0
27	FW	(Croatia) CRO	Andrej Kramarić	36	18	28+6	15	2	3
28	FW	(Hungary) HUN	Ádám Szalai	23	8	7+15	8	0+1	0
Players transferred out during the season
9	FW	(Chile) CHI	Eduardo Vargas	6	0	0+5	0	0+1	0
20	DF	(South Korea) KOR	Kim Jin-su	0	0	0	0	0	0
34	FW	(Turkey) TUR	Barış Atik	3	0	0+3	0	0	0

Last updated: 20 May 2017
Source: Competitions

=== Goalscorers ===
Rank	No.	Pos	Nat	Name	Bundesliga	DFB-Pokal	Total
1	27	FW	(Croatia)	Andrej Kramarić	15	3	18
2	14	FW	(Germany)	Sandro Wagner	11	1	12
3	19	FW	(Germany)	Mark Uth	7	1	8
3	28	FW	(Hungary)	Ádám Szalai	8	0	8
5	13	MF	(Germany)	Kerem Demirbay	6	0	6
6	17	MF	(Switzerland)	Steven Zuber	4	0	4
7	6	MF	(Germany)	Sebastian Rudy	2	1	3
7	21	DF	(Germany)	Benjamin Hübner	2	1	3
9	7	MF	(Germany)	Lukas Rupp	2	0	2
9	18	MF	(Germany)	Nadiem Amiri	2	0	2
9	25	DF	(Germany)	Niklas Süle	2	0	2
12	4	DF	(Bosnia and Herzegovina)	Ermin Bičakčić	1	0	1
12	15	DF	(Germany)	Jeremy Toljan	1	0	1
12	23	FW	(Germany)	Marco Terrazzino	1	0	1
Own goal					0	0	0
Totals					64	7	71

Last updated: 13 May 2017

=== Clean sheets ===
Rank	No.	Pos	Nat	Name	Bundesliga	DFB-Pokal	Total
1	1	GK	(Germany)	Oliver Baumann	12	1	13
Totals					12	1	13

Last updated: 20 May 2017

=== Disciplinary record ===
No.	Pos	Nat	Player	Bundesliga			DFB-Pokal			Total		
No.	Pos	Nat	Player	Booked	(yellow card) (yellow-red card)	Sent off (straight red)	Booked	(yellow card) (yellow-red card)	Sent off (straight red)	Booked	(yellow card) (yellow-red card)	Sent off (straight red)
1	GK	(Germany)	Oliver Baumann	1	0	0	0	0	0	1	0	0
3	DF	(Germany)	Pavel Kadeřábek	2	0	0	0	1	0	2	1	0
4	DF	(Bosnia and Herzegovina)	Ermin Bičakčić	4	0	0	0	0	0	4	0	0
5	DF	(Switzerland)	Fabian Schär	2	0	0	0	0	0	2	0	0
6	MF	(Germany)	Sebastian Rudy	9	0	0	0	0	0	9	0	0
7	MF	(Germany)	Lukas Rupp	2	0	0	0	0	0	2	0	0
8	MF	(Poland)	Eugen Polanski	1	0	0	0	0	0	1	0	0
9	FW	(Chile)	Eduardo Vargas	1	0	0	0	0	0	1	0	0
13	MF	(Germany)	Kerem Demirbay	4	0	0	1	0	0	5	0	0
14	FW	(Germany)	Sandro Wagner	3	0	1	1	0	0	4	0	1
15	DF	(Germany)	Jeremy Toljan	1	0	0	0	0	0	1	0	0
16	MF	(Switzerland)	Pirmin Schwegler	1	0	0	0	0	0	1	0	0
17	MF	(Switzerland)	Steven Zuber	2	0	0	0	0	0	2	0	0
18	MF	(Germany)	Nadiem Amiri	2	0	0	0	0	0	2	0	0
19	FW	(Germany)	Mark Uth	4	0	0	0	0	0	4	0	0
21	DF	(Germany)	Benjamin Hübner	10	0	0	0	0	0	10	0	0
22	MF	(Germany)	Kevin Vogt	6	0	0	0	0	0	6	0	0
25	DF	(Germany)	Niklas Süle	4	0	0	0	0	0	4	0	0
27	FW	(Croatia)	Andrej Kramarić	1	0	0	0	0	0	1	0	0
28	FW	(Hungary)	Ádám Szalai	2	0	0	1	0	0	3	0	0
30	MF	(Germany)	Philipp Ochs	1	0	0	0	0	0	1	0	0
Totals				63	0	1	3	1	0	66	1	1

Last updated: 20 May 2017
