= Nadiem Amiri =

German footballer (born 1996)

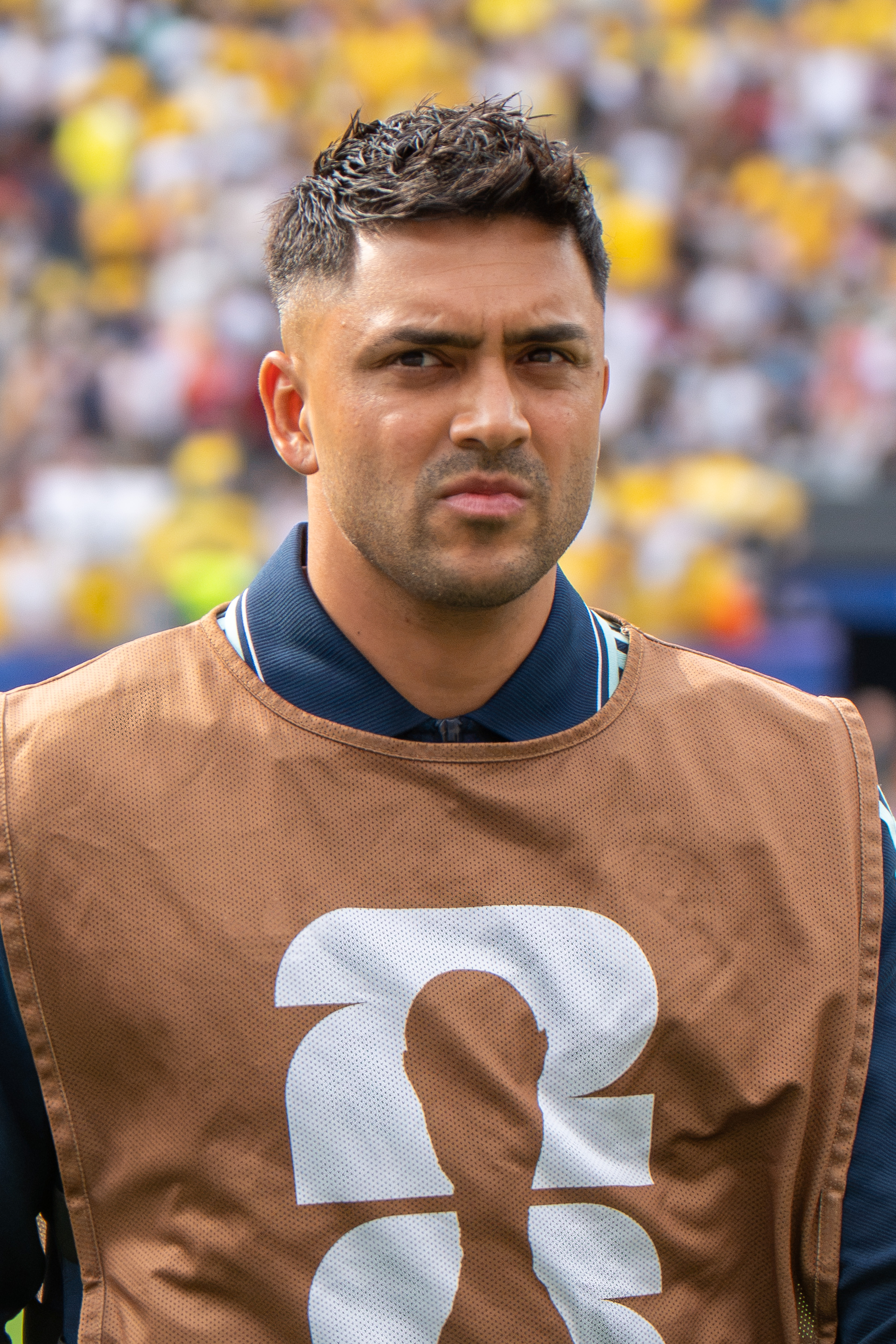
- Amiri with Germany in 2026

Personal information
- Full name: Nadiem Amiri
- Date of birth: 27 October 1996 (age 30)
- Place of birth: Ludwigshafen, Germany
- Height: 1.80 m (5 ft 11 in)
- Position: Attacking midfielder

Team information
- Current team: Mainz 05
- Number: 10

Youth career
- Ludwigshafener SC
- 1. FC Kaiserslautern
- –2012: Waldhof Mannheim
- 2012–2014: TSG Hoffenheim

Senior career*
Years	Team	Apps	(Gls)
2014–2015	TSG Hoffenheim II	22	(4)
2015–2019	TSG Hoffenheim	106	(11)
2019–2024	Bayer Leverkusen	105	(8)
2022	→ Genoa (loan)	13	(0)
2024–	Mainz 05	79	(20)

International career^{‡}
2013–2014	Germany U18	8	(2)
2014–2016	Germany U19	13	(3)
2015–2016	Germany U20	3	(0)
2016–2019	Germany U21	24	(6)
2021	Germany Olympic	3	(2)
2019–	Germany	14	(1)
Medal record
UEFA European Under-21 Championship
Winner	2017 Poland
Runner-up	2019 Italy
- * Club domestic league appearances and goals as of 22:30, 30 October 2026 (UTC) ‡ National team caps and goals as of 09:21, 25 September 2026 (UTC)

Nadiem Amiri (born 27 October 1996) is a German professional footballer who plays as an attacking midfielder for Bundesliga club Mainz 05 and the Germany national team.

== Club career ==
=== TSG Hoffenheim ===
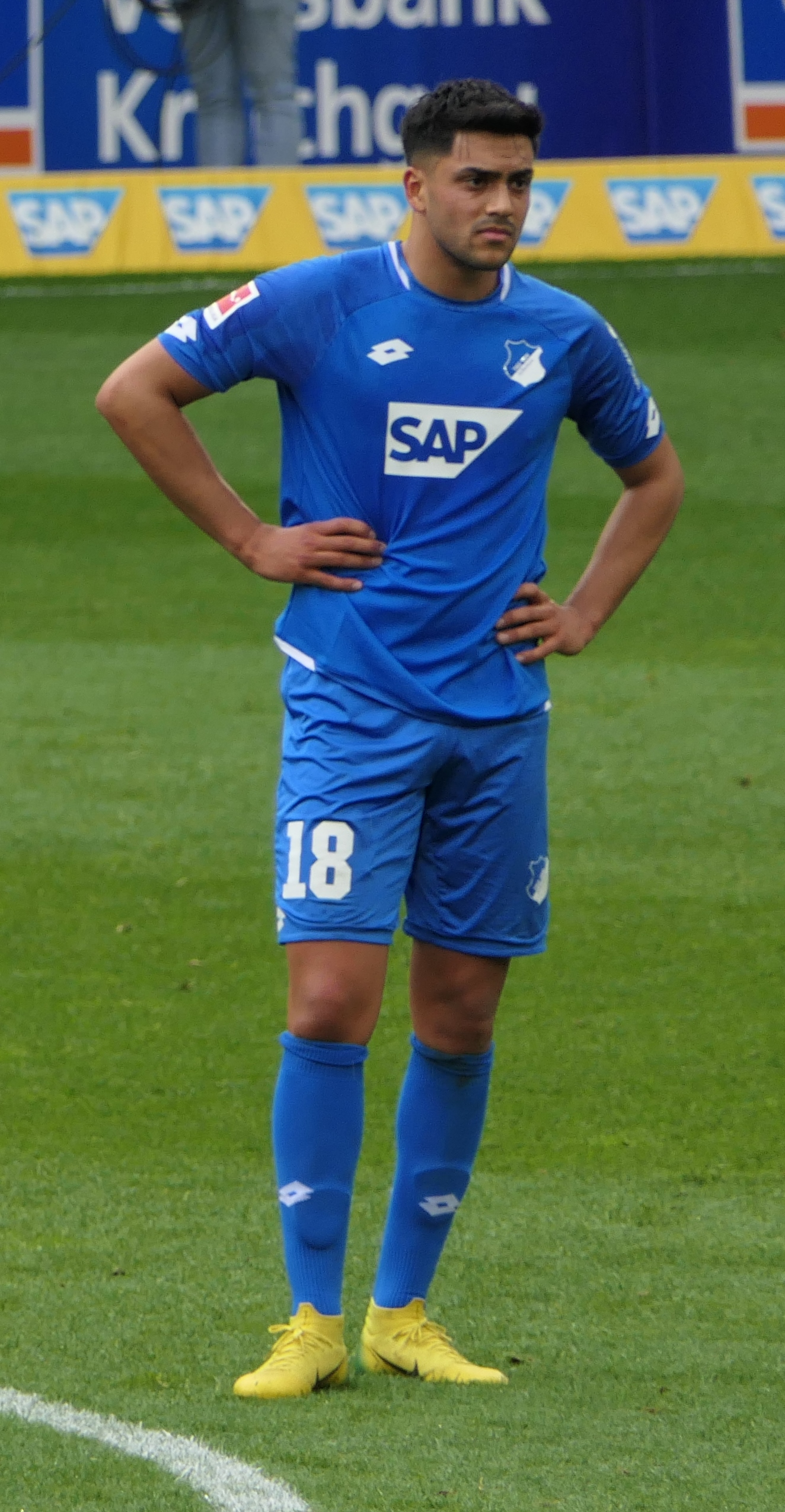
Amiri with TSG Hoffenheim in 2019

Amiri joined TSG Hoffenheim in 2012 from Waldhof Mannheim. He made his Bundesliga debut on 7 February 2015 in a 3–0 away defeat against VfL Wolfsburg. Amiri recorded his first goal of the season and for his club in a 3–3 draw against Borussia Mönchengladbach on 28 November. On 30 April 2016, he scored the winning goal in the 84th minute during a 2–1 victory against FC Ingolstadt 04. On 12 June 2017, Amiri signed a contract extension with Hoffenheim until 2020. On 20 October, Amiri scored a goal in a 3–1 UEFA Europa League victory against İstanbul Başakşehir F.K. and sealed his club's first ever victory in Europe.

=== Bayer Leverkusen and Loan to Genoa ===
Amiri signed a five-year contract with Bayer Leverkusen in July 2019.

On 29 January 2022, he joined Genoa in Italy on loan. Genoa would have held an obligation to buy his rights at the end of the loan if certain conditions were met.

In the 2022–23 Bundesliga, Amiri played 36 matches in all competitions, in which he scored four goals in the league. In August 2023, Amiri traveled to Leeds ahead of a supposed transfer to Leeds United, but it unfortunately collapsed.

=== Mainz ===
On 31 January 2024, Amiri signed a 2.5-year contract with Mainz 05.

== International career ==
=== Youth ===
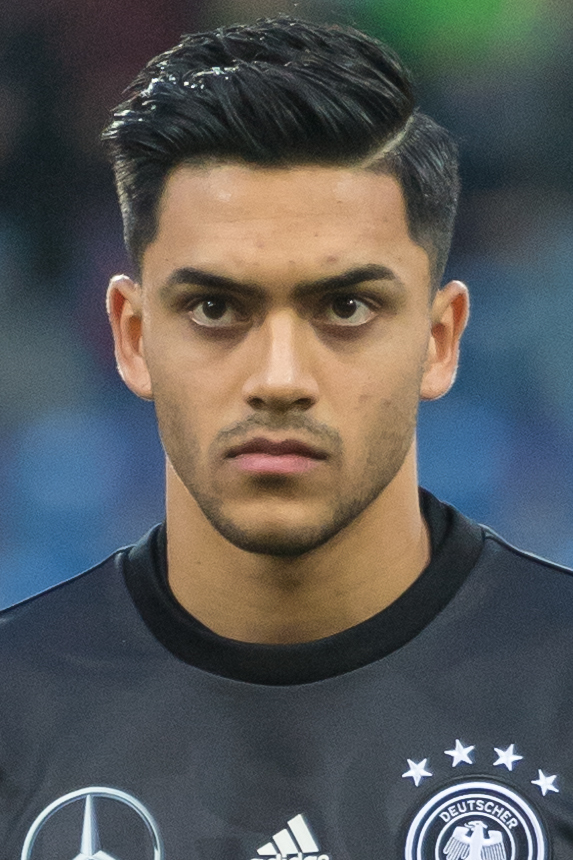
Amiri with Germany U21 in 2016

Amiri made his debut for Germany under-21 in March 2016, coming on as a late substitute in a European U21 Championship qualifier against Russia under-21. He was part of the Germany under-21 team that won the 2017 UEFA European Under-21 Championship by defeating Spain under-21 in the final.

Amiri was selected as one of three overage players for the Tokyo Olympics, where he scored in each of Germany's first two games, a defeat to Brazil and a victory against Saudi Arabia.

=== Senior ===
On 9 October 2019, Amiri made his Germany national team debut in a 2–2 friendly draw against Argentina, coming on as a substitute to Julian Brandt in the 66th minute. In March 2025, he was recalled to the team by Julian Nagelsmann after being absent for more than five years since his last appearance against the Czech Republic. Amiri scored his first senior national team goal on 7 September 2025 in a World Cup qualifier against Northern Ireland. On 21 May 2026, he was selected in Germany’s 26-man squad for the 2026 FIFA World Cup.

== Personal life ==
Amiri was born in Ludwigshafen to an Afghan family hailing from Kabul, who fled Afghanistan for Germany in 1988 due to the Soviet–Afghan War. His father Nazir Amiri has stated that the family identifies as Afghan and rejects ethnic categorization. He speaks fluent German, Dari and English. His cousin Zubayr Amiri and brother Nauwid Amiri also play football. He has been married to Nele Kracht since 2023, with whom he had two sons.

Amiri is sponsored by American sportswear supplier Nike.

== Career statistics ==
=== Club ===
As of match played 30 October 2026

Appearances and goals by club, season and competition
Club	Season	League			National cup (Note: Includes DFB-Pokal)		Europe		Total	
Club	Season	Division	Apps	Goals	Apps	Goals	Apps	Goals	Apps	Goals
TSG Hoffenheim II	2014–15	Regionalliga Südwest	13	2	—		—		13	2
TSG Hoffenheim II	2015–16	Regionalliga Südwest	7	2	—		—		7	2
TSG Hoffenheim II	2016–17	Regionalliga Südwest	1	0	—		—		1	0
TSG Hoffenheim II	2018–19	Regionalliga Südwest	1	0	—		—		1	0
TSG Hoffenheim II	Total		22	2	—		—		22	2
TSG Hoffenheim	2014–15	Bundesliga	7	0	2	0	—		9	0
TSG Hoffenheim	2015–16	Bundesliga	25	4	0	0	—		25	4
TSG Hoffenheim	2016–17	Bundesliga	33	2	1	0	—		34	2
TSG Hoffenheim	2017–18	Bundesliga	28	2	1	1	4 (Note: One appearance in UEFA Champions League, three appearances and one goal in UEFA Europa League)	1	33	4
TSG Hoffenheim	2018–19	Bundesliga	13	3	0	0	1 (Note: Appearance in UEFA Champions League)	0	14	3
TSG Hoffenheim	Total		106	11	4	1	5	1	115	13
Bayer Leverkusen	2019–20	Bundesliga	30	1	5	0	7 (Note: Four appearances in UEFA Champions League, three appearances in UEFA Europa League)	0	42	1
Bayer Leverkusen	2020–21	Bundesliga	29	2	2	2	8 (Note: Appearances in UEFA Europa League)	1	39	5
Bayer Leverkusen	2021–22	Bundesliga	13	1	2	0	5	1	20	2
Bayer Leverkusen	2022–23	Bundesliga	25	4	0	0	11 (Note: Five appearances in UEFA Champions League, six appearances in UEFA Europa League)	0	36	4
Bayer Leverkusen	2023–24	Bundesliga	8	0	1	0	—		9	0
Bayer Leverkusen	Total		105	8	10	2	31	2	146	12
Genoa (loan)	2021–22	Serie A	13	0	—		—		13	0
Mainz 05	2023–24	Bundesliga	15	1	—		—		15	1
Mainz 05	2024–25	Bundesliga	30	7	2	1	—		31	8
Mainz 05	2025–26	Bundesliga	26	12	2	1	7 (Note: Appearances in UEFA Conference League)	4	35	17
Mainz 05	2026–27	Bundesliga	8	0	1	2	—		9	2
Mainz 05	Total		79	20	5	4	7	4	91	28
Career total			325	43	19	7	43	7	387	57

=== International ===
As of match played 24 September 2026

Appearances and goals by national team and year
National team	Year	Apps	Goals
Germany	2019	3	0
Germany	2020	2	0
Germany	2025	4	1
Germany	2026	5	0
Total		14	1

As of match played 7 September 2025
Scores and results list Germany's goal tally first.

List of international goals scored by Nadiem Amiri
No.	Date	Venue	Cap	Opponent	Score	Result	Competition
1	7 September 2025	RheinEnergieStadion, Cologne, Germany	9	Northern Ireland	2–1	3–1	2026 FIFA World Cup qualification

== Honours ==
Germany U21

- UEFA European Under-21 Championship: 2017

Individual

- Bundesliga Goal of the Month: January 2021
- VDV Bundesliga Team of the Season: 2024–25
