= Junior Ponce =

Peruvian footballer (born 1994)

Júnior Ponce
Personal information
- Full name: Alexander Júnior Ponce Pardo
- Date of birth: 16 February 1994 (age 32)
- Place of birth: Callao, Peru
- Height: 1.71 m (5 ft 7 in)
- Positions: Right winger; attacking midfielder

Team information
- Current team: FC Carlos Stein
- Number: 20

Youth career
- 2003–2011: Cantolao
- 2011: Pachuca

Senior career*
Years	Team	Apps	(Gls)
2012	Alianza Lima	5	(0)
2013–2017	1899 Hoffenheim	0	(0)
2013	→ Pelotas (loan)	0	(0)
2013–2014	→ Alianza Lima (loan)	13	(2)
2014–2015	→ Vitória Setúbal (loan)	7	(0)
2015–2017	→ Universidad San Martín (loan)	42	(5)
2017	Universidad San Martín	27	(4)
2018	UTC Cajamarca	35	(1)
2019–2020	Cantolao	39	(5)
2021	Club Deportivo Los Chankas	9	(2)
2022-	Santos de Nasca	10	(0)

International career
2011	Peru U17	4	(0)
- * Club domestic league appearances and goals as of 11 September 2022

Alexander Júnior Ponce Pardo (born 16 February 1994) is a Peruvian footballer who plays for FC Carlos Stein.

== Career ==
=== Early years ===
He started his career playing as a youth in the Academia Cantolao. Then he went on to the C.F. Pachuca from Mexico and in the year 2012 he signed for the Club Alianza Lima of Peru. He was invited to pass tests in FC Barcelona and Schalke 04 but nothing concrete.

=== Club career ===
At the end of 2012, he was registered by the Hoffenheim from the Bundesliga, until 2016. In January, 2013, it was on loan for six months to the Esporte Clube Pelotas of the Brazilian league.

After his step into the fourth division of the Brazilian football, he was given in loan again in Alianza Lima for the season 2013. He had a brief step into Portuguese football out on loan with, Vitória Setúbal, after that, he went back to Peru football league, this time in USMP (Club Deportivo Universidad de San Martin de Porres)

== International career ==
He has been international with Sub -17 Peruvian national team. He played some games with the U-20 Peruvian national team but was removed for disciplinary reasons.
