= Park In-hyeok =

South Korean footballer

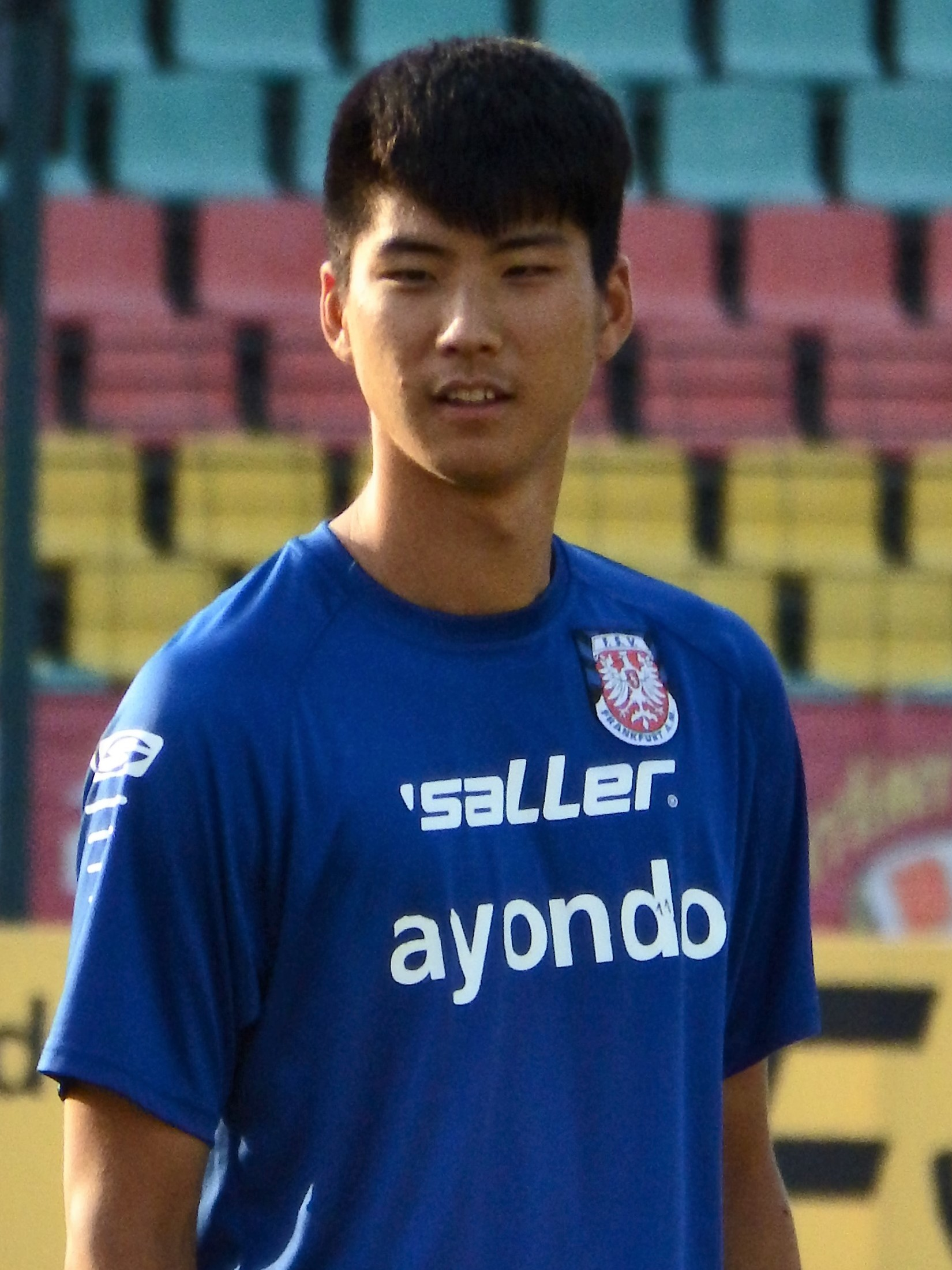
- Park In-hyeok with FSV Frankfurt

Personal information
- Date of birth: 29 December 1995 (age 30)
- Place of birth: Seoul, South Korea
- Height: 1.85 m (6 ft 1 in)
- Position: Forward

Team information
- Current team: Gwangju FC
- Number: 18

Youth career
- 2013–2015: Kyung Hee University

Senior career*
Years	Team	Apps	(Gls)
2015–2018	Hoffenheim	0	(0)
2015–2016	→ FSV Frankfurt (loan)	5	(0)
2016–2017	→ Koper (loan)	11	(1)
2017–2018	→ Vojvodina (loan)	4	(0)
2018–2021	Daejeon Citizen	100	(17)
2022–	Jeonnam Dragons	38	(7)

International career^{‡}
2013	South Korea U20	4	(1)
2015–2018	South Korea U23	15	(1)
- * Club domestic league appearances and goals as of 30 August 2023 ‡ National team caps and goals as of 30 August 2023

Park In-hyeok (Korean: 박인혁, born 29 December 1995) is a South Korean professional footballer who plays as a forward for K League 2 club Jeonnam Dragons.

== Club career ==
=== Kyung Hee University ===
Born in the capital Seoul, in 2013, Park started playing for his university's football team, Kyung Hee University, where he was a striker. He left university in 2015 and signed for TSG 1899 Hoffenheim.

=== TSG 1899 Hoffenheim ===
In 2015, he joined Bundesliga side TSG 1899 Hoffenheim.

==== FSV Frankfurt ====
In the summer of 2015, Park joined 2. Bundesliga club FSV Frankfurt on a one-year loan from TSG 1899 Hoffenheim. His debut came in a 2–0 away win against Berliner FC Dynamo in the DFB-Pokal, coming on for Edmond Kapllani in the 88th minute. He then made his league debut in 1–2 home loss to Karlsruher SC coming on in the 72nd minute for Zlatko Dedić.

==== Koper ====
In 2016, Park joined Slovenian team Koper on a season-long loan from TSG 1899 Hoffenheim. He made his debut on 10 September 2016 coming on as a substitute for Joel Valencia in the 80th minute against Krško in a 1–0 win.

=== Vojvodina ===
On the last day of 2017 summer transfer window, Park signed a one-year-loan-deal with Vojvodina.

== International career ==
While playing with Vojvodina, Park played for South Korean national U23 team at the 2018 AFC U-23 Championship.
