= O ewiges Feuer, o Ursprung der Liebe, BWV 34 =

Church cantata by Johann Sebastian Bach

O ewiges Feuer, o Ursprung der Liebe
- BWV 34 (34.1)
- Church cantata by J. S. Bach
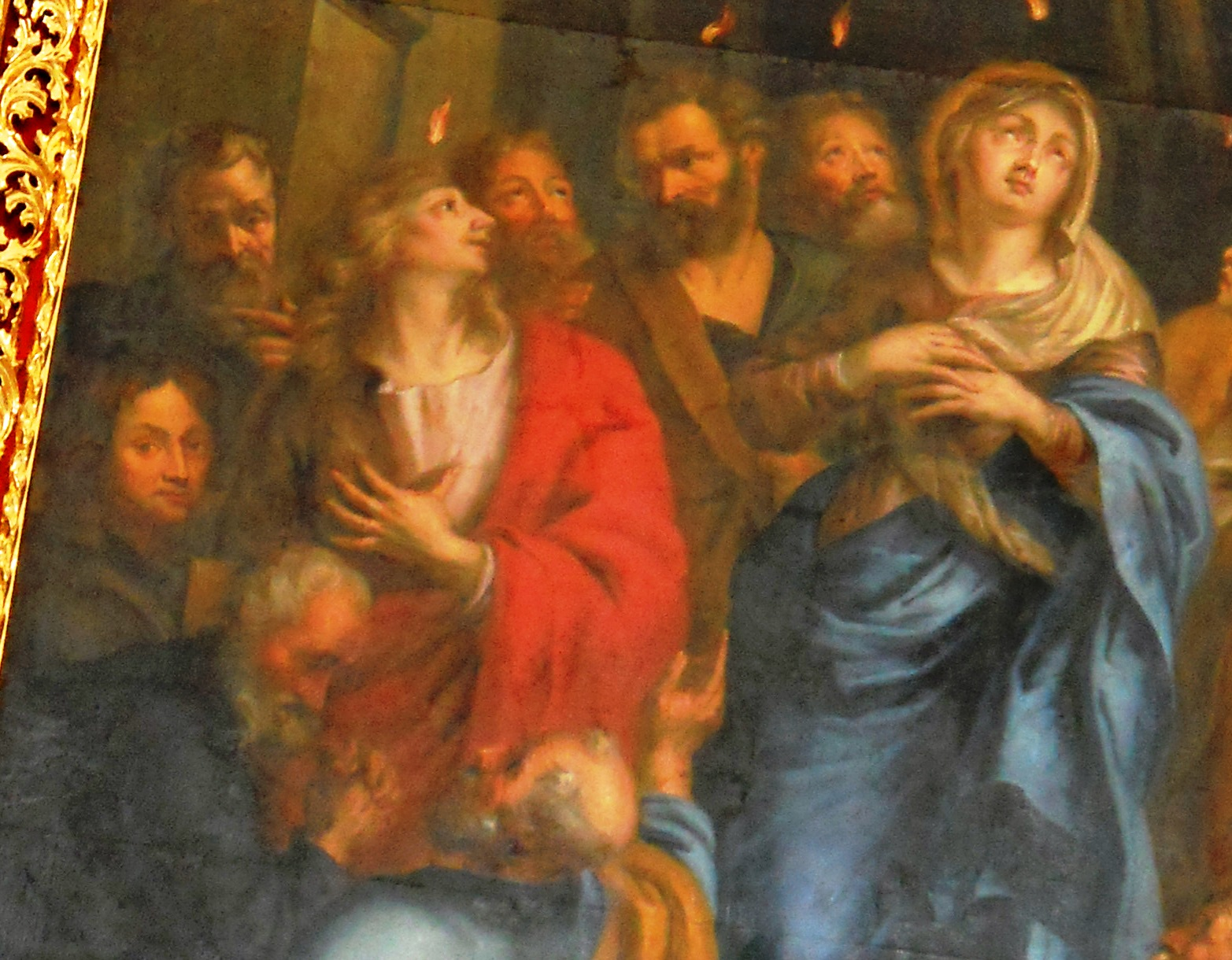
- Pfingstwunder (Pentecost miracle), the topic of the cantata, 1701
- Related: basis for BWV 34a
- Occasion: Pentecost Sunday
- Performed: 1 June 1727: Leipzig
- Movements: 5
- Vocal: alto, tenor and bass soloists; SATB choir
- Instrumental: 3 trumpets; timpani; 2 flutes / 2 oboes; strings; continuo

O ewiges Feuer, o Ursprung der Liebe (O eternal fire, o source of love), BWV 34 (BWV 34.1), is a church cantata by Johann Sebastian Bach. He composed it in Leipzig for Pentecost Sunday, and it was the basis for a later wedding cantata, BWV 34a, beginning with the same line. Bach led the first performance on 1 June 1727.

The librettist of the cantata is unknown. A central contemplative aria for alto, accompanied by two flutes and muted strings, is framed by recitatives, while the two outer movements are performed by the chorus and a festive Baroque instrumental ensemble of three trumpets, timpani, two oboes, strings and continuo. The last movement quotes the conclusion of Psalm 128, "Friede über Israel" (Peace upon Israel). The themes of eternal fire, love, dwelling together and peace suit both occasions, wedding and Pentecost.

== History and text ==
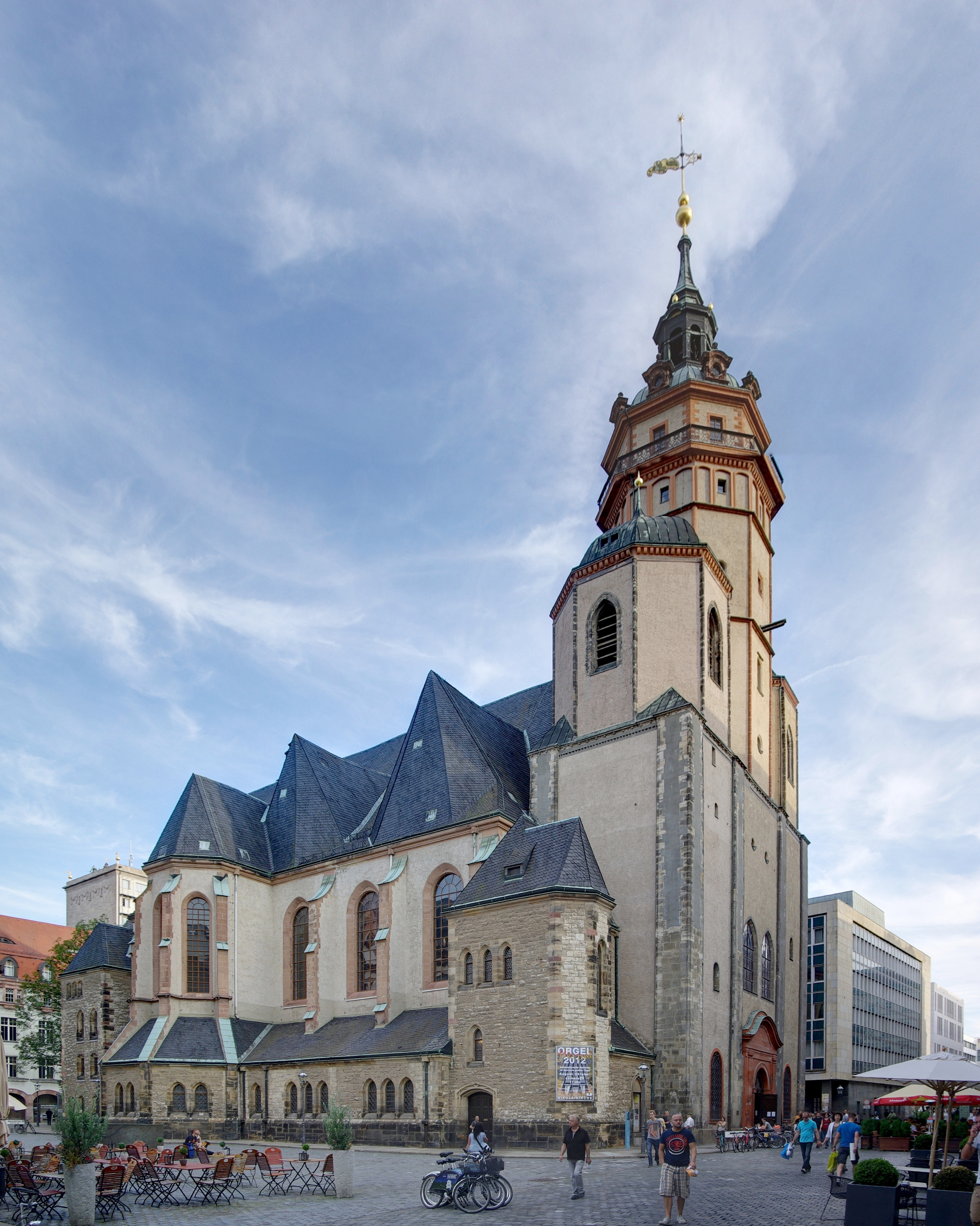
Nikolaikirche in Leipzig, where the cantata was first performed

Bach adapted movements 1, 3 and 5 of this cantata for Pentecost Sunday in a later wedding cantata, O ewiges Feuer, o Ursprung der Liebe, BWV 34a. Formerly it was believed that BWV 34a (as BWV 34.2 was then called) was the older work. In Bach's Leipzig, the readings for Pentecost were from the Acts of the Apostles, on the Holy Spirit (Acts 2:1–13), and from the Gospel of John, in which Jesus announces the Spirit who will teach, in his Farewell Discourse (John 14:23–31). The workload of the composer and his musicians was high for Christmas, Easter and Pentecost, because in Leipzig they were all celebrated for three days. The texts are of unknown authorship. The beginning of the text of the wedding cantata could be kept unchanged, because the image of the flames and the spirit of love suit the Pentecostal events as well as a wedding: the author had only to replace the reference to "vereinigtes Paar" (united couple) with a reference to the gospel. Movement 5 quotes the conclusion of Psalm 128, "Friede über Israel" (Peace upon Israel, Psalms 128:6). This quote was already part of movement 4 of the wedding cantata, which quotes in movement 3 verses 4–6a from the same psalm.

Bach led the first performance on 1 June 1727 in the Nikolaikirche. The Bach scholar Klaus Hofmann notes that a printed libretto for the congregation was recently found in the Russian National Library in St. Petersburg, containing the texts for the three feast days of Pentecost and Trinity of 1727. Until then the work had been dated much later, such as 1746 when a revival took place for which performance material exists. As the music of the 1727 version is lost, the timing of Bach's revisions to the wedding cantata is not known. It is likely that he revised it further in the 1740s because he wrote a new score.

== Structure and scoring ==
Bach structured the cantata in five movements, with two choral movements framing a sequence of recitative–aria–recitative. Bach scored the work for three vocal soloists (alto, tenor, bass), a four-part choir and a Baroque instrumental ensemble of three trumpets (Tr), timpani (Ti), two flauti traversi (Ft), two oboes (Ob), two violins (Vl), viola (Va) and basso continuo. The Bach scholar Christoph Wolff describes the "large-scale instrumental scoring" as "suited to the festive occasion".

In the following table of the movements, the scoring follows the Neue Bach-Ausgabe. The continuo, playing throughout, is not shown.

Movements of O ewiges Feuer, o Ursprung der Liebe
No.	Title	Text	Type	Vocal	Winds	Strings	Key	Time
1	O ewiges Feuer, o Ursprung der Liebe	anon.	Chorus	SATB	3Tr Ti 2Ob	2Vl Va	D major	3/4
2	Herr, unsre Herzen halten dir	anon.	Recitative	T				common time
3	Wohl euch, ihr auserwählten Seelen	anon.	Aria	A	2Ft	2Vl Va	A major	common time
4	Erwählt sich Gott die heilgen Hütten	anon.	Recitative	B				common time
5	Friede über Israel	Psalm 128:6; anon.	Chorus	SATB	3Tr Ti 2Ob	2Vl Va	D major	common time

== Music ==
=== 1 ===
The opening chorus, "O ewiges Feuer, o Ursprung der Liebe" (O eternal fire, o source of love), illustrates two contrasting subjects, "ewig" (eternal) and "Feuer" (fire). While "ewig" appears as long notes, held for more than one measure, the flames (or tongues) of the fire are set in "lively figuration from the strings and agile coloraturas from the voices". The instrumental ritornello comprises a sustained trumpet entry, active strings, and "flickering" oboes, drums, and trumpets. Unlike in most da capo movements, this ritornello appears only at the beginning and end. The basses enter first, "holding a top D for most of five bars to symbolise the 'eternal', the other three parts aglitter with 'fiery' embellishments", as John Eliot Gardiner notes. The middle section develops these themes in minor keys, in "dance-like vocal pairings", before the ritornello returns one more time to reprise the first section.

=== 2 ===
A tenor recitative, "Herr, unsre Herzen halten dir dein Wort der Wahrheit für" (Lord, our hearts keep Your word of truth fast), adopts an authoritative tone, is in minor mode, and begins with a bass pedal. It expands the concept of God abiding with his people, as outlined in the gospel.

=== 3 ===
An alto aria, "Wohl euch, ihr auserwählten Seelen, die Gott zur Wohnung ausersehn" (It is well for you, you chosen souls, whom God has designated for his dwelling), conveys images of contentment by incorporating a lilting berceuse-like rhythm, with an obbligato melody played by muted violins and flutes in octaves and tenths. It is accompanied by a tonic pedal in the continuo. The aria is in adapted ternary form. The pastoral character suited the original text, "Wohl euch, ihr auserwählten Schafe" (It is well for you, you chosen sheep), which alludes to the bridegroom, a pastor or "shepherd of souls". Gardiner notes "the tender sensuousness of the pastoral writing, the pairings of thirds and sixths, the blending of flutes and muted strings and the satisfying textures and calm enchantment disturbed only momentarily by modulation", and considers that the piece possibly had some "deeper personal significance".

=== 4 ===
The bass recitative, "Erwählt sich Gott die heilgen Hütten, die er mit Heil bewohnt" (If God chooses the holy dwellings that He inhabits with salvation), is quite similar in character to the tenor recitative. The last two measures form an introduction to the closing movement.

=== 5 ===
The closing chorus, "Friede über Israel" (Peace upon Israel), opens with a solemn rendering of the psalm text, marked Adagio. The violins and oboes first play an ascending figure. Gardiner notes that the section is "reminiscent of and equivalent in grandeur to the opening exordium to the B minor Mass". The slow music on the psalm text is contrasted by a "spirited and very secular-sounding march, setting "Dankt den höchsten Wunderhänden" (Thank the exalted wondrous hands). Both sections appear first as instrumental and are then repeated by the chorus. Hofmann notes that this music is reminiscent of Bach's works for the Köthen court, composed for Leopold, Prince of Anhalt-Köthen. Gardiner concludes:

There is an extended stretch of thrilling orchestra writing before the choir returns to the ‘Peace upon Israel’ theme, this time within the Allegro pulse, with a final shout of joy from the sopranos on a top B bringing this irresistible Whit Sunday cantata to a glorious conclusion.

== Selected recordings ==
The selection is taken from the listing on the Bach-Cantatas website.

- J. S. Bach: Cantatas BWV 34 & BWV 56 – Jonathan Sternberg, Wiener Kammerchor, Wiener Symphoniker. Bach Guild/Artemis Classics 1950.
- J. S. Bach: Cantatas BWV 187 & BWV 34 – Diethard Hellmann, Kantorei & Kammerorchester of Christuskirche Mainz. Cantate 1958.
- Les Grandes Cantates de J. S. Bach Vol. 8 – Fritz Werner, Heinrich-Schütz-Chor Heilbronn, Pforzheim Chamber Orchestra. Erato 1961.
- Die Bach Kantate Vol. 36 – Helmuth Rilling, Gächinger Kantorei, Bach-Collegium Stuttgart. Hänssler 1972.
- J. S. Bach: Das Kantatenwerk – Sacred Cantatas Vol. 2 – Nikolaus Harnoncourt, Wiener Sängerknaben, Chorus Viennensis (Chorus Master: Hans Gillesberger), Concentus Musicus Wien. Teldec 1973.
- Bach Cantatas Vol. 3 – Ascension Day, Whitsun, Trinity – Karl Richter, Münchener Bach-Chor, Münchener Bach-Orchester. Archiv Produktion 1975.
- J. S. Bach: Cantatas BWV 11 & BWV 34 – Philip Ledger, King's College Choir Cambridge, English Chamber Orchestra. HMV 1981.
- Bach: Cantatas 34, 50, 147 – Harry Christophers, The Sixteen. Collins Classics 1990.
- J. S. Bach: Whitsun Cantatas – John Eliot Gardiner, Monteverdi Choir, English Baroque Soloists. Archiv Produktion 1999.
- J. S. Bach: Kantaten – Alt.: Karl-Friedrich Beringer, Windsbacher Knabenchor, Deutsche Kammer-Virtuosen Berlin. Rondeau Production 1999.
- Bach Cantatas Vol. 26: Long Melford – John Eliot Gardiner, Monteverdi Choir, English Baroque Soloists. Soli Deo Gloria 2000.
- Bach Edition Vol. 21 – Cantatas Vol. 12 – Pieter Jan Leusink, Holland Boys Choir, Netherlands Bach Collegium. Brilliant Classics 2000.
- J. S. Bach: Complete Cantatas Vol. 21 – Ton Koopman, Amsterdam Baroque Orchestra & Choir. Antoine Marchand 2001.
- J. S. Bach: The Ascension Oratorio and Two Festive Cantatas – Greg Funfgeld, Bach Choir of Bethlehem, The Bach Festival Orchestra. Dorian Recordings 2001.
- Eröffnungskonzert zum Bachfest Leipzig 2005 "Bach und die Zukunft” – Georg Christoph Biller, Thomanerchor, Akademie für Alte Musik Berlin, Matthias Rexroth, Martin Petzold, Matthias Weichert, MDR Figaro 2005
- Thomanerchor Leipzig – Das Kirchenjahr mit Bach, Vol. 7: Pfingsten · Pentecost – Cantatas BWV 34, 74, 172 – Georg Christoph Biller, Thomanerchor, Gewandhausorchester Leipzig. Rondeau Production 2007
- J. S. Bach: Kantate BMV 34 "O ewiges Feuer, O Ursprung der Liebe" – Rudolf Lutz, Vokalensemble der Schola Seconda Pratica, Schola Seconda Pratica. Gallus Media 2009.
