= 2009–10 1. FC Nürnberg season =

1. FC Nürnberg
2009–10 season
- Chairman: Franz Schäfer
- Manager: Michael Oenning / Dieter Hecking
- Stadium: Frankenstadion
- Bundesliga: 16th (won relegation playoff)
- DFB-Pokal: 2nd round
- Top goalscorer: League: Albert Bunjaku (12); All: Albert Bunjaku (12)
- Highest home attendance: 48,548 vs Bayern, Dortmund and Köln
- Lowest home attendance: 35,376 vs Bochum
- Average home league attendance: 42,335
Home colours	Away colours	Third colours

The 2009–10 1. FC Nürnberg season was the 110th season in the club's football history.

== Match results ==
=== Legend ===
Win Draw Loss

=== Bundesliga ===
8 August 2009 1	1. FC Nürnberg	1–2	Schalke 04	Nuremberg
15:30 CEST (UTC+02)	Mintál 88'	Match Report	36', 50' Kurányi	Stadium: Frankenstadion; Attendance: 46,780 (sell-out); Referee: Knut Kircher; Man of the Match: Kurányi

15 August 2009 2	Eintracht Frankfurt	1–1	1. FC Nürnberg	Frankfurt
15:30 CEST (UTC+02)	Caio 17'	Match Report	64' Bunjaku	Stadium: Commerzbank-Arena; Attendance: 49,000; Referee: Michael Weiner; Man of the Match: Bunjaku

22 August 2009 3	1. FC Nürnberg	0–2	Hannover 96	Nuremberg
15:30 CEST (UTC+02)		Match Report	15', 86' Štajner	Stadium: Frankenstadion; Attendance: 38,671; Referee: Dr. Jochen Drees; Man of the Match: Štajner

29 August 2009 4	VfB Stuttgart	0–0	1. FC Nürnberg	Stuttgart
15:30 CEST (UTC+02)		Match Report		Stadium: Mercedes-Benz Arena; Attendance: 42,000 (sell-out); Referee: Babak Rafati; Man of the Match: Schäfer

12 September 2009 5	1. FC Nürnberg	1–0	Borussia Mönchengladbach	Nuremberg
15:30 CEST	Kluge 6'	Match Report		Stadium: Frankenstadion; Attendance: 46,780 (sell-out); Referee: Peter Gagelmann; Man of the Match: Kluge

19 September 2009 6	Bayern Munich	2–1	1. FC Nürnberg	Munich
15:30 CEST	Olić 55'; Van Buyten 82'	Match Report	73' Choupo-Moting	Stadium: Allianz Arena; Attendance: 69,000 (sell-out); Referee: Florian Meyer; Man of the Match: van Buyten

25 September 2009 7	1. FC Nürnberg	0–1	VfL Bochum	Nuremberg
20:30 CEST (UTC+02)		Match Report	7' Klimowicz	Stadium: Frankenstadion; Attendance: 35,376; Referee: Marco Fritz; Man of the Match: Maltritz

3 October 2009 8	Bayer 04 Leverkusen	4–0	1. FC Nürnberg	Leverkusen
15:30 CEST (UTC+02)	Kroos 2'; Rolfes 28' (pen.); Derdiyok 34'; Kießling 68'	Match Report		Stadium: BayArena; Attendance: 26,785; Referee: Markus Schmidt; Man of the Match: Rolfes

17 October 2009 9	1. FC Nürnberg	3–0	Hertha BSC	Nuremberg
15:30 CEST (UTC+02)	Gygax 18'; Bunjaku 26', 60'	Match Report		Stadium: Frankenstadion; Attendance: 38,094; Referee: Thorsten Kinhöfer; Man of the Match: Bunjaku

24 October 2009 10	1899 Hoffenheim	3–0	1. FC Nürnberg	Sinsheim
15:30 CEST (UTC+02)	Eichner 34'; Ibišević 38'; Zuculini 64'	Match Report		Stadium: Rhein-Neckar-Arena; Attendance: 30,150 (sell-out); Referee: Michael Weiner; Man of the Match: Eichner

31 October 2009 11	1. FC Nürnberg	2–2	Werder Bremen	Nuremberg
15:30 CEST (UTC+02)	Eigler 3'; Bunjaku 33'	Match Report	72', 90' Hunt	Stadium: Frankenstadion; Attendance: 42,258; Referee: Guido Winkmann; Man of the Match: Hunt

7 November 2009 12	Mainz 05	1–0	1. FC Nürnberg	Mainz
15:30 CET (UTC+01)	Soto 38'	Match Report		Stadium: Stadion am Bruchweg; Attendance: 20,000; Referee: Michael Kempter; Man of the Match: Schäfer

21 November 2009 13	VfL Wolfsburg	2–3	1. FC Nürnberg	Wolfsburg
15:30 CET (UTC+01)	Dejagah 59'; Grafite 79' (pen.)	Match Report	56', 64' Bunjaku; 90' Kluge	Stadium: Volkswagen-Arena; Attendance: 28,736; Referee: Markus Schmidt; Man of the Match: Kluge

28 November 2009 14	1. FC Nürnberg	0–1	SC Freiburg	Nuremberg
15:30 CET (UTC+01)		Match Report	12' Reisinger	Stadium: Frankenstadion; Attendance: 40,824; Referee: Babak Rafati; Man of the Match: Banović

5 December 2009 15	Borussia Dortmund	4–0	1. FC Nürnberg	Dortmund
15:30 CET (UTC+01)	Großkreutz 8'; Barrios 13'; Zidan 36'; Hummels 61'	Match Report		Stadium: Westfalenstadion; Attendance: 72,100; Referee: Peter Gagelmann; Man of the Match: Hummels

12 December 2009 16	1. FC Nürnberg	0–4	Hamburger SV	Nuremberg
15:30 CET (UTC+01)		Match Report	47', 74' Elia; 60' Jansen; 66' Torun	Stadium: Frankenstadion; Attendance: 44,865; Referee: Thorsten Kinhöfer; Man of the Match: Jansen

20 December 2009 17	1. FC Köln	3–0	1. FC Nürnberg	Cologne
17:30 CET (UTC+01)	Geromel 37'; Novaković 70', 77'	Match Report		Stadium: RheinEnergieStadion; Attendance: 44,500; Referee: Lutz Wagner; Man of the Match: Novakovič

17 January 2010 18	Schalke 04	1–0	1. FC Nürnberg	Gelsenkirchen
15:30 CET (UTC+01)	Kurányi 48'	Match Report		Stadium: Veltins-Arena; Attendance: 61,515; Referee: Michael Kempter; Man of the Match: Neuer

23 January 2010 19	1. FC Nürnberg	1–1	Eintracht Frankfurt	Nuremberg
15:30 CET (UTC+01)	Eigler 27'	Match Report	40' Köhler	Stadium: Frankenstadion; Attendance: 37,464; Referee: Dr. Jochen Drees; Man of the Match: Ochs

30 January 2010 20	Hannover 96	1–3	1. FC Nürnberg	Hannover
15:30 CET (UTC+01)	Štajner 65'	Match Report	30', 64', 69' Bunjaku	Stadium: AWD Arena; Attendance: 26,722; Referee: Knut Kircher; Man of the Match: Bunjaku

6 February 2010 21	1. FC Nürnberg	1–2	VfB Stuttgart	Nuremberg
18:30 CET (UTC+01)	Bunjaku 60'	Match Report	22' Gebhart; 87' Hilbert	Stadium: Frankenstadion; Attendance: 40,384; Referee: Felix Zwayer; Man of the Match: Khedira

12 February 2010 22	Borussia Mönchengladbach	2–1	1. FC Nürnberg	Mönchengladbach
20:30 CET (UTC+01)	Colautti 27'; Friend 74'	Match Report	47' Bunjaku	Stadium: Borussia-Park; Attendance: 34,297; Referee: Florian Meyer; Man of the Match: Bradley

20 February 2010 23	1. FC Nürnberg	1–1	Bayern Munich	Nuremberg
15:30 CET (UTC+01)	Gündoğan 54'	Match Report	38' Müller	Stadium: Frankenstadion; Attendance: 48,548 (sell-out); Referee: Thorsten Kinhöfer; Man of the Match: Breno

27 February 2010 24	VfL Bochum	0–0	1. FC Nürnberg	Bochum
15:30 CET (UTC+01)		Match Report		Stadium: Ruhrstadion; Attendance: 24,780; Referee: Peter Gagelmann; Man of the Match: Schäfer

7 March 2010 25	1. FC Nürnberg	3–2	Bayer Leverkusen	Nuremberg
15:30 CET (UTC+01)	Choupo-Moting 42', 45'; Tavares 55'	Match Report	66' Kießling; 73' Helmes	Stadium: Frankenstadion; Attendance: 40,329; Referee: Dr. Jochen Drees; Man of the Match: Choupo-Moting

13 March 2010 26	Hertha BSC	1–2	1. FC Nürnberg	Berlin
15:30 CET (UTC+01)	Gekas 36'	Match Report	61' Bunjaku; 90' Charisteas	Stadium: Olympic Stadium; Attendance: 57,761; Referee: Knut Kircher; Man of the Match: Schäfer

20 March 2010 27	1. FC Nürnberg	0–0	1899 Hoffenheim	Nuremberg
15:30 CET (UTC+01)		Match Report		Stadium: Frankenstadion; Attendance: 40,421; Referee: Thorsten Kinhöfer; Man of the Match: Šimunić

27 March 2010 28	Werder Bremen	4–2	1. FC Nürnberg	Bremen
15:30 CET (UTC+01)	Mertesacker 1', 20'; Borowski 36'; Fritz 90'	Match Report	47' Frantz; 63' (pen.) Choupo-Moting	Stadium: Weserstadion; Attendance: 36,123; Referee: Markus Schmidt; Man of the Match: Mertesacker

3 April 2010 29	1. FC Nürnberg	2–0	Mainz 05	Nuremberg
15:30 CET (UTC+01)	Frantz 14'; Choupo-Moting 40'	Match Report		Stadium: Frankenstadion; Attendance: 41,222; Referee: Michael Weiner; Man of the Match: Risse

11 April 2010 30	1. FC Nürnberg	0–2	VfL Wolfsburg	Nuremberg
17:30 CET (UTC+01)		Match Report	66' Džeko; 78' Grafite	Stadium: Frankenstadion; Attendance: 40,593; Referee: Guido Winkmann; Man of the Match: Benaglio

17 April 2010 31	SC Freiburg	2–1	1. FC Nürnberg	Freiburg
15:30 CET (UTC+01)	Maroh 4' (o.g.); Cissé 60'	Match Report	79' Maroh	Stadium: Badenova-Stadion; Attendance: 22,900 (sell-out); Referee: Lutz Wagner; Man of the Match: Idrissou

24 April 2010 32	1. FC Nürnberg	2–3	Borussia Dortmund	Nuremberg
15:30 CET (UTC+01)	Frantz 30'; Eigler 84'	Match Report	27', 63', 78' Barrios	Stadium: Frankenstadion; Attendance: 48,548 (sell-out); Referee: Knut Kircher; Man of the Match: Barrios

1 May 2010 33	Hamburger SV	4–0	1. FC Nürnberg	Hamburg
15:30 CEST (UTC+02)	Pitroipa 10'; Petrić 19', 25'; Van Nistelrooy 73'	Match Report		Stadium: Volksparkstadion; Attendance: 53,727; Referee: Thorsten Kinhöfer; Man of the Match: Petrić

8 May 2010 34	1. FC Nürnberg	1–0	1. FC Köln	Nuremberg
15:30 CEST (UTC+02)	Ottl 88'	Match Report		Stadium: Frankenstadion; Attendance: 48,548 (sell-out); Referee: Peter Gagelmann; Man of the Match: Ottl

==== Playoff ====
13 May 2010 1	1. FC Nürnberg	1–0	FC Augsburg	Nuremberg
20:30 CEST (UTC+02)	Eigler 84'	Match Report		Stadium: Frankenstadion; Attendance: 40,509; Referee: Babak Rafati; Man of the Match: Jentzsch

16 May 2010 2	FC Augsburg	0–2 (3–0 agg.)	1. FC Nürnberg	Augsburg
18:00 CEST (UTC+02)		Match Report	34' Gündoğan; 63' (pen.) Choupo-Moting	Stadium: Impuls-Arena; Attendance: 30,660 (sell-out); Referee: Manuel Gräfe; Man of the Match: Gündoğan

=== DFB-Pokal ===
1 August 2009 1	Dynamo Dresden	0–3	1. FC Nürnberg	Dresden
15:30 CEST (UTC+02)		Match Report	12' Kluge; 25' Mintál; 53' Gündoğan	Stadium: Rudolf-Harbig-Stadion; Attendance: 15,460 (sell-out); Referee: Lutz Wagner

22 September 2009 2	1. FC Nürnberg	0–1	1899 Hoffenheim	Nuremberg
19:00 CEST (UTC+02)		Match Report	35' Nilsson	Stadium: Frankenstadion; Attendance: 26,041; Referee: Manuel Gräfe; Man of the Match: Carlos Eduardo

== Player information ==
=== Roster and statistics ===
Squad Season 2009–10 Sources:
Player					Bundesliga		Playoff		DFB-Pokal		Totals	
Player	Nat.	Birthday	at FCN since	Previous club	Matches	Goals	Matches	Goals	Matches	Goals	Matches	Goals
Goalkeepers
Raphael Schäfer	German	30 January 1979	2008	VfB Stuttgart	30	0	2	0	2	0	34	0
Alexander Stephan	German	15 September 1986	2006	1. FC Nürnberg II	5	0	0	0	0	0	5	0
Defenders
Dennis Diekmeier	German	20 October 1989	2009	Werder Bremen	30	0	0	0	2	0	32	0
Breno	Brazilian	13 October 1989	2010	Bayern Munich	7	0	0	0	0	0	7	0
Håvard Nordtveit	Norwegian	21 June 1990	2009	Arsenal	19	0	0	0	1	0	20	0
Andreas Wolf	German	12 June 1982	2002	1. FC Nürnberg II	29	0	2	0	1	0	32	0
Dominic Maroh	German	4 March 1987	2008	SSV Reutlingen	26	1	2	0	2	0	30	1
Juri Judt	German	24 July 1986	2008	Greuther Fürth	18	0	2	0	1	0	21	0
Pascal Bieler	German	26 February 1986	2008	Hertha BSC	3	0	1	0	0	0	4	0
Matthew Spiranovic	Australian	27 June 1988	2007	Australian Institute of Sport	1	0	0	0	0	0	1	0
Javier Pinola	Argentine	24 February 1983	2005	Racing Club	33	2	1	0	2	0	36	2
Midfielders
Daniel Gygax	Swiss	21 August 1981	2008	Metz	10	1	0	0	0	0	10	1
Marek Mintál	Slovakian	2 September 1977	2003	Žilina	22	1	2	0	2	1	26	2
Marcel Risse	German	17 December 1989	2009	Bayer Leverkusen	20	0	2	0	1	0	23	0
Mike Frantz	German	14 October 1986	2008	1. FC Saarbrücken	24	3	2	0	0	0	26	3
Dario Vidošić	Australian	8 April 1987	2007	Brisbane Roar	8	0	0	0	1	0	9	0
Mickaël Tavares	Senegalese	25 October 1982	2010	Hamburger SV	11	1	0	0	0	0	11	1
İlkay Gündoğan	German	24 October 1990	2009	VfL Bochum II	22	1	2	1	2	1	26	3
Andreas Ottl	German	1 March 1985	2010	Bayern Munich	17	1	2	0	0	0	19	1
Peer Kluge	German	22 November 1980	2007	Borussia Mönchengladbach	17	2	0	0	2	1	19	3
Thomas Broich	German	29 January 1981	2009	1. FC Köln	7	0	0	0	2	0	9	0
Jawhar Mnari	Tunisian	8 November 1976	2005	Espérance Sportive de Tunis	3	0	0	0	1	0	4	0
Forwards
Christian Eigler	German	1 January 1984	2008	Arminia Bielefeld	24	3	2	1	2	0	28	4
Angelos Charisteas	Greek	9 February 1980	2007	Feyenoord	19	1	0	0	1	0	20	1
Albert Bunjaku	Swiss	29 November 1983	2009	Rot-Weiß Erfurt	28	12	2	0	2	0	32	12
Eric Maxim Choupo-Moting	Cameroonian	23 March 1989	2009	Hamburger SV	25	5	2	1	1	0	28	6
Isaac Boakye	Ghanaian	26 November 1981	2008	VfL Wolfsburg	9	0	1	0	0	0	10	0

=== Transfers ===
==== In ====
Pula Pizda Coaiele

== Kits ==
Home	Home Alternate	Away	Third

Type	Shirt	Shorts	Socks	First appearance / Info
Home	Dark red	Black	Black	
Home Alt.	Dark red	Black	Dark red	Bundesliga, Match 15, 5 December against Dortmund
Away	White	White	White	
Third	Black	Black	Black	
