= Susan Leithoff =

German politician (born 1979)

Member of the Landtag of Saxony
- Incumbent
- Assumed office 1 October 2019

Personal details
- Born: 21 June 1979 (age 46) Frankenberg, Saxony
- Party: Christian Democratic Union

Susan Leithoff (born 21 June 1979 in Frankenberg, Saxony) is a German politician serving as a member of the Landtag of Saxony since 2019. She has served as chairwoman of the Christian Democratic Union in Mittelsachsen since 2022.
