= Eric Maxim Choupo-Moting =

Cameroon international footballer (born 1989)

- Choupo-Moting with the New York Red Bulls in 2026

Personal information
- Full name: Jean-Eric Maxim Choupo-Moting
- Date of birth: 23 March 1989 (age 37)
- Place of birth: Hamburg, West Germany
- Height: 1.91 m (6 ft 3 in)
- Position: Forward

Team information
- Current team: New York Red Bulls
- Number: 13

Youth career
- 1995–2000: Teutonia 05
- 2000–2003: Altona 93
- 2003–2004: FC St. Pauli
- 2004–2007: Hamburger SV

Senior career*
Years	Team	Apps	(Gls)
2007–2011	Hamburger SV II	31	(1)
2007–2011	Hamburger SV	23	(2)
2009–2010	→ FC Nürnberg (loan)	25	(5)
2011–2014	Mainz 05	74	(20)
2012–2013	Mainz 05 II	2	(0)
2014–2017	Schalke 04	82	(18)
2017–2018	Stoke City	30	(5)
2018–2020	Paris Saint-Germain	31	(6)
2020–2024	Bayern Munich	88	(19)
2025–	New York Red Bulls	55	(22)

International career^{‡}
2007–2009	Germany U19	5	(4)
2009–2010	Germany U21	5	(4)
2010–	Cameroon	76	(20)
Medal record
Men's football
Representing Cameroon
Africa Cup of Nations
Third place	2021 Cameroon
- * Club domestic league appearances and goals as of 19:47, 15 November 2026 (UTC) ‡ National team caps and goals as of 21:28, 24 October 2025 (UTC)

Jean-Eric Maxim Choupo-Moting (born 23 March 1989) is a professional footballer who plays as a forward for Major League Soccer club New York Red Bulls. Born in Germany, he plays for the Cameroon national team.

Choupo-Moting began his career with Hamburger SV, making his Bundesliga debut in August 2007. He spent the 2009–10 season on loan at 1. FC Nürnberg and in August 2011 he joined 1. FSV Mainz 05. After three seasons with Mainz he moved on to Schalke 04 in August 2014. He became a regular for the Gelsenkirchen club, and made over 80 appearances, before joining Premier League side Stoke City in August 2017. Struggling for minutes in the EFL Championship with Stoke, he decided to move to Ligue 1 club Paris Saint-Germain on a two-year deal in August 2018. After his contract with Paris Saint-Germain expired, Choupo-Moting returned to the Bundesliga and joined Bayern Munich in October 2020 on a free transfer. After he was let go as a free agent by Bayern at the end of the 2023–24 season, he joined the New York Red Bulls on a free transfer in December 2024.

== Club career ==
=== Early career ===
Choupo-Moting was born in Hamburg to a German mother and a Cameroonian father and began playing football at an early age. He played in the youth teams at Teutonia 05, Altona 93 and FC St. Pauli before joining Hamburger SV in 2004. He played semi-professional football with Hamburger SV II in the Regionalliga Nord before breaking into the first team in August 2007.

=== Hamburger SV ===
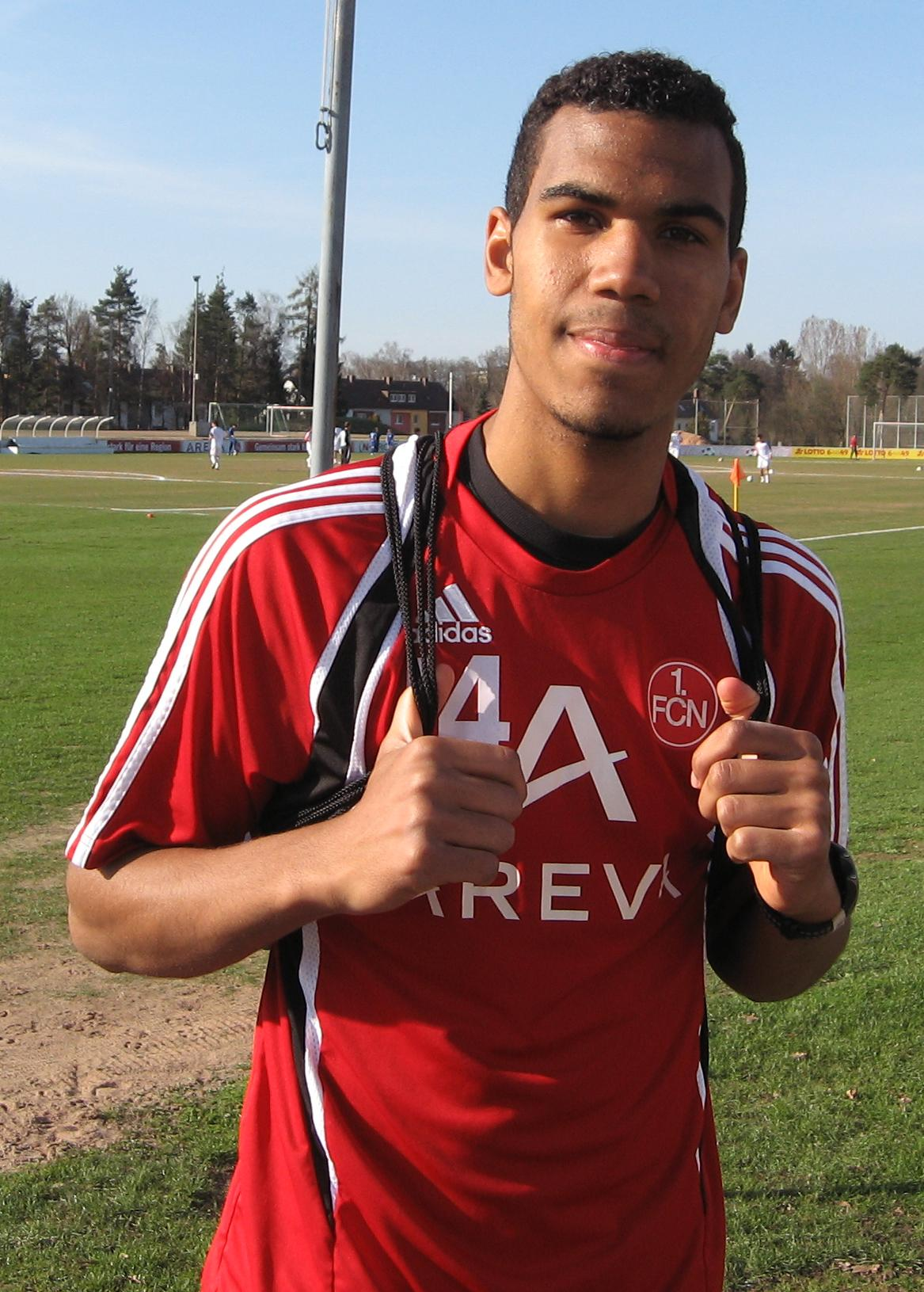
Choupo-Moting during his loan spell at 1. FC Nürnberg, 2010

Choupo-Moting made his first appearance as a Hamburger SV player in a Bundesliga match on 11 August 2007, being sent on as a substitute in the 69th minute against Hannover 96. Choupo-Moting struggled to establish himself in Martin Jol's side and he spent the 2009–10 season on loan at 1. FC Nürnberg with whom he scored six goals in 27 appearances helping Nürnberg retain their Bundesliga status. On his return to Hamburg, Choupo-Moting struggled to make much impact in 2010–11 and after scoring just two goals by January he was set for another loan move this time to 1. FC Köln, however the move fell through after registration documents were faxed to the German Football Association too late. After his botched transfer he spent the second half of the campaign with the reserves.

=== Mainz 05 ===
On 18 May 2011, Choupo-Moting signed a three-year contract with Bundesliga side 1. FSV Mainz 05 on a free transfer from Hamburg. Choupo-Moting enjoyed a successful 2011–12 season with the club, scoring ten times in the Bundesliga. However, he missed most of the 2012–13 season with a knee injury and was therefore unable to make an impact. He returned to form in 2013–14, scoring ten goals in 32 appearances helping Mainz secure seventh position and qualification to the UEFA Europa League, however at the end of the campaign he decided not to renew his contract with the club.

=== Schalke 04 ===
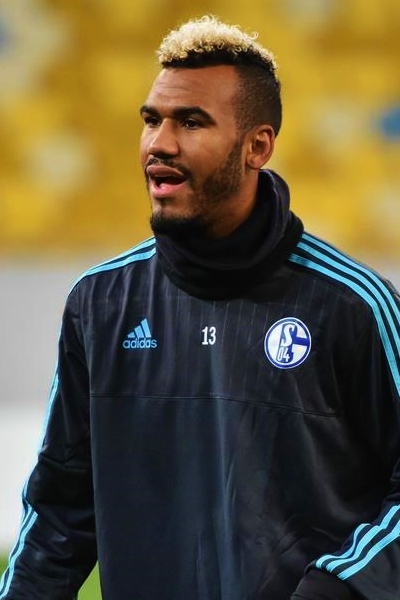
Choupo-Moting playing for Schalke 04 in 2016

On 5 July 2014, after Choupo-Moting's contract expired at Mainz, FC Schalke 04 confirmed he had signed a three-year professional contract with them until 30 June 2017. The transfer was reported as a free transfer by Schalke's sport and communications manager Horst Heldt. Choupo-Moting was assigned the squad number 13.

On 6 December 2014, he scored a hat-trick in a 4–0 home win over VfB Stuttgart.

=== Stoke City ===
On 7 August 2017, Choupo-Moting joined Premier League side Stoke City on a three-year contract. He made his debut for Stoke on 12 August 2017 against Everton. Choupo-Moting scored both goals in a 2–2 draw against Manchester United on 9 September 2017 and was named man of the match by BBC Sport. Against Everton, he came on as a substitute, scored within five minutes of his arrival, but injured himself in the process and Stoke lost 2–1. Choupo-Moting played 32 times in 2017–18, scoring five goals as Stoke suffered relegation to the EFL Championship.

=== Paris Saint-Germain ===
==== 2018–19 season ====
On 31 August 2018, Choupo-Moting joined Ligue 1 champions Paris Saint-Germain on a free transfer. He made his debut for the club on 18 September 2018 in the 3–2 Champions League away defeat against Liverpool before scoring on his Ligue 1 debut against Rennes five days later. On 7 April 2019, Choupo-Moting made a mistake in the Ligue 1 home match against Strasbourg; when a shot from teammate Christopher Nkunku was about to cross the goal line, Choupo-Moting attempted to touch the ball with his left foot across the goal line but instead unintentionally diverted the ball onto the near post and prevented a certain goal. The BBC described it as "the worst miss in the history of football".

==== 2019–20 season ====
On 25 August 2019, Choupo-Moting came off the bench to replace the injured Edinson Cavani in the 16th minute and scored twice in the second half of a 4–0 home win over Toulouse; his first goal was a superb solo goal scored after he beat four Toulouse defenders in the penalty area. On 12 August 2020, Choupo-Moting scored in the third minute of stoppage time against Atalanta in the Champions League, completing a late turnaround for PSG and sending the team into the semi-finals of the competition for the first time in 25 years. Later on, he came on as a substitute in the Champions League final, which ended in a 1–0 defeat for Paris Saint-Germain against Bayern Munich.

=== Bayern Munich ===
==== 2020–21 season ====
On 5 October 2020, Choupo-Moting joined Bayern Munich on a one-year contract. Choupo-Moting made his debut for Bayern in the first round of the DFB-Pokal on 15 October and scored twice as the club defeated fifth division side 1. FC Düren by a score of 3–0. On 9 December, he scored his first Champions League goal with Bayern Munich in a 2–0 win over Lokomotiv Moscow. He scored his first league goal on 25 February 2021, scoring the first goal in Bayern's 5–1 victory over 1. FC Köln. In April 2021, he scored in both Champions League quarter-final matches against his former club Paris Saint-Germain, including a 1–0 away win at Parc des Princes, yet his club lost on the away goals rule after a 3–3 draw on aggregate. In May 2021, he lifted his first Bundesliga title with Bayern.

==== 2021–22 season ====
On 17 August 2021, he came on in the 88th minute for Robert Lewandowski during the 2021 DFL-Supercup, a 3–1 win over Borussia Dortmund to clinch the DFL-Supercup title. On 25 August 2021, he scored his first hat-trick at Bayern after scoring four goals in the club's first round 12–0 win over Bremer SV in the DFB-Pokal. This made him the first Bayern player since March 2005 when Claudio Pizarro scored four goals against Freiburg in the 2004–05 DFB-Pokal season. He also set up three other goals in the match, making him the first ever Bayern player to be directly involved in seven goals in the DFB-Pokal since records began in the 2008–09 season.

==== 2022–23 season ====
On 16 October 2022, he scored his first Bundesliga goal of the season in a 5–0 win over Freiburg. Afterwards, he scored a goal in each of the last two group stage matches against Barcelona and Inter Milan, in which Bayern Munich finished top of their Group C with six wins out of six matches for the second year in a row. On 3 March 2023, he signed a one-year contract extension until 30 June 2024.

==== 2023–24 season ====
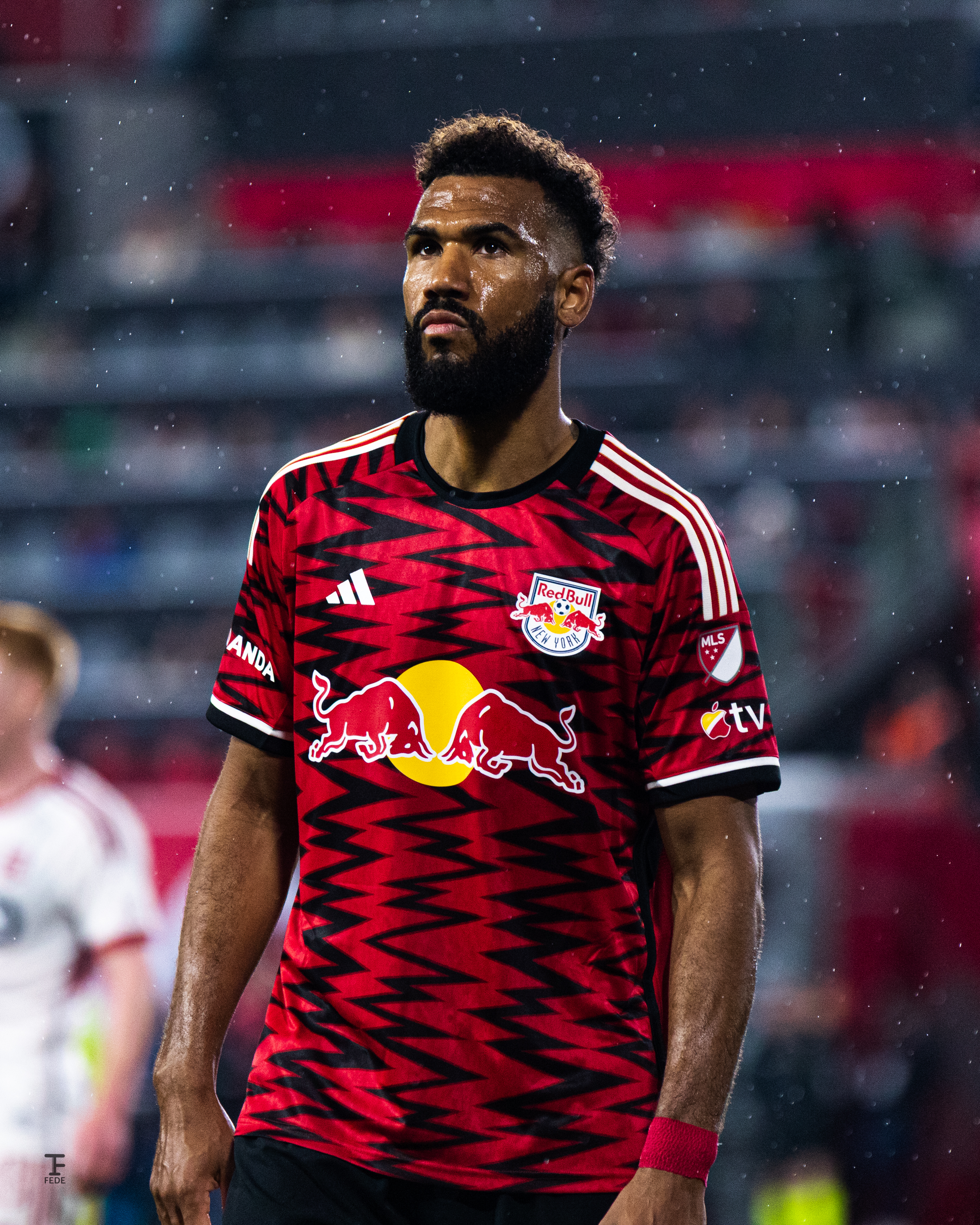
Choupo-Moting 2025

On 23 September 2023, he scored his first Bundesliga goal of the season in a 5–0 win over VfL Bochum. On 11 November 2023, he netted Bayern's fourth goal in a 4–2 victory over Heidenheim. Thus, he succeeded in scoring against every Bundesliga club competing that season. On 12 May 2024, it was officially announced that he would leave the club upon the expiration of his contract.

=== New York Red Bulls ===
On 18 December 2024, it was announced that Choupo-Moting had joined MLS side New York Red Bulls on a free transfer. On 15 March 2025, Choupo-Moting recorded his first goal for New York, on a penalty kick, in a 2–2 draw with Orlando City SC. On 28 May 2025, Choupo-Moting scored two goals from the penalty spot in a 4–2 victory over Charlotte FC.

== International career ==
=== Germany ===
Choupo-Moting has a German passport and represented his country of birth and his mother's country Germany at the 2008 UEFA European Under-19 Championship qualification for the 2008 UEFA European Under-19 Championship and at the 2011 UEFA European Under-21 Championship qualification for the 2011 UEFA European Under-21 Championship.

=== Cameroon ===
==== 2010 World Cup ====
On 11 May 2010, Choupo-Moting earned his first call-up for the Cameroon national team, and represented Cameroon at the 2010 FIFA World Cup in South Africa.

==== Cameroon eligibility investigation ====
The Tunisian Football Federation, which governs the Tunisia national team, had questioned FIFA on whether Choupo-Moting fulfilled nationality criteria to play for Cameroon. "With regards to the protest lodged by the Tunisian Football Federation in relation to the eligibility of Choupo-Moting representing Cameroon, FIFA had communicated to the Tunisia Football Federation that no breach of the FIFA regulations has been committed by the Cameroonian Football Federation," a FIFA spokesman told BBC Sport. Choupo-Moting played for both the Germany national youth football teams and the Germany national under-21 team, including being born in Germany and growing up in Germany with German parentage, but had his switch of national allegiance approved by FIFA before representing Cameroon. The Tunisian Football Federation's complaint came during the 2014 FIFA World Cup qualification – CAF third round despite Choupo-Moting playing at the 2010 World Cup in South Africa.

==== 2014 and 2022 World Cups ====
In June 2014, Choupo-Moting was called up for Cameroon's World Cup squad for the 2014 World Cup in Brazil. On 3 January 2017, he announced that he would not play in the 2017 Africa Cup of Nations.

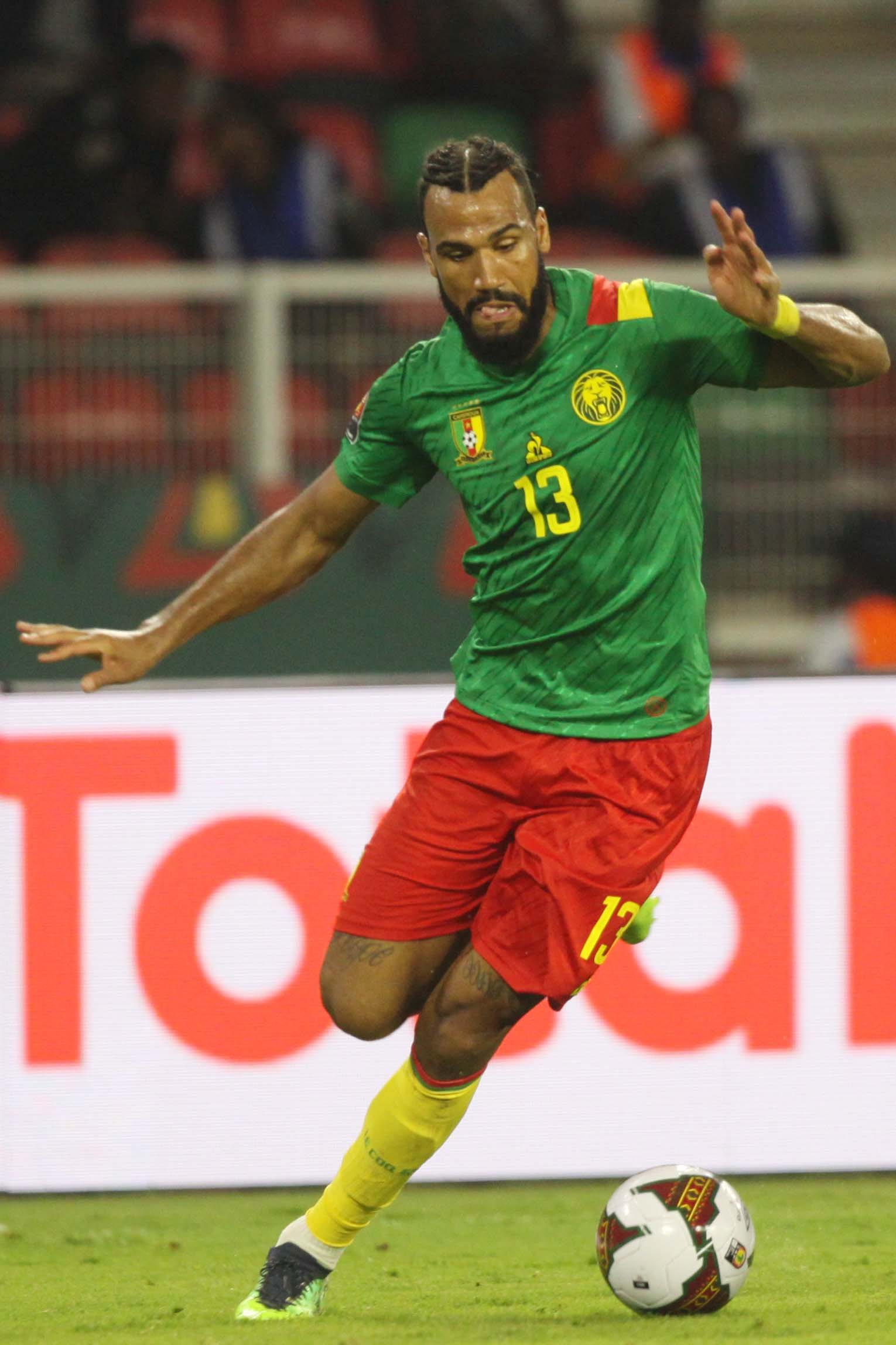
Choupo-Moting with the Cameroon national team in 2022

On 29 March 2022, during the third round of the 2022 FIFA World Cup qualification, he scored a goal for Cameroon to lead 1–0 in an away match against Algeria, which equalised the tie 1–1 on aggregate. That match went on into extra time and both teams scored; hence, Cameroon qualified to the 2022 FIFA World Cup on away goals.

On 9 November 2022, he was included in the 26-man squad for the 2022 FIFA World Cup in Qatar. On 28 November, he scored his first World Cup goal in a 3–3 draw against Serbia.

==== 2026 World Cup qualifying and AFCON exclusion ====
Following the unsuccessful 2026 World Cup qualifying campaign, Choupo-Moting was among four veteran players excluded from the 2025 Africa Cup of Nations squad.

== Personal life ==
Choupo-Moting was born in Altona, Hamburg, and he attended Gymnasium Altona. He was born to a German mother and Cameroonian father.

Choupo-Moting has a German wife named Nevin. They have two children, born 2013 and 2021.

== Style of play ==
Choupo-Moting is often stationed as a striker or on the left wing. Touted as being "comfortable" playing throughout the middle or onto the left-side of the pitch.

Choupo-Moting has been cited as having a "composed finisher," with the possession of a "purposeful and powerful dribbling ability." Choupo-Moting has also been credited for a high work rate and long stride whilst playing.

== Career statistics ==
=== Club ===
As of match played 24 October 2026

Appearances and goals by club, season and competition
Club	Season	League			National cup (Note: Includes DFB-Pokal, FA Cup, Coupe de France, U.S. Open Cup)		League cup (Note: Includes EFL Cup, Coupe de la Ligue)		Continental		Other		Total	
Club	Season	Division	Apps	Goals	Apps	Goals	Apps	Goals	Apps	Goals	Apps	Goals	Apps	Goals
Hamburger SV II	2006–07	Regionalliga Nord	12	1	—		—		—		—		12	1
Hamburger SV II	2007–08	Regionalliga Nord	8	0	—		—		—		—		8	0
Hamburger SV II	2008–09	Regionalliga Nord	2	0	—		—		—		—		2	0
Hamburger SV II	2009–10	Regionalliga Nord	2	0	—		—		—		—		2	0
Hamburger SV II	2010–11	Regionalliga Nord	7	0	—		—		—		—		7	0
Hamburger SV II	Total		31	1	—		—		—		—		31	1
Hamburger SV	2007–08	Bundesliga	13	0	3	1	—		6 (Note: Appearances in UEFA Cup)	2	1 (Note: Appearance in UEFA Intertoto Cup)	0	23	3
Hamburger SV	2008–09	Bundesliga	0	0	0	0	—		0	0	—		0	0
Hamburger SV	2009–10	Bundesliga	0	0	1	0	—		1 (Note: Appearance(s) in UEFA Europa League)	0	—		2	0
Hamburger SV	2010–11	Bundesliga	10	2	2	0	—		—		—		12	2
Hamburger SV	Total		23	2	6	1	—		7	2	1	0	37	5
1. FC Nürnberg (loan)	2009–10	Bundesliga	25	5	1	0	—		—		2 (Note: Appearances in Bundesliga promotion play-offs)	1	28	6
Mainz 05	2011–12	Bundesliga	34	10	3	0	—		1	0	—		38	10
Mainz 05	2012–13	Bundesliga	8	0	1	1	—		—		—		9	1
Mainz 05	2013–14	Bundesliga	32	10	2	1	—		—		—		34	11
Mainz 05	Total		74	20	6	2	—		1	0	—		81	22
Mainz 05 II	2012–13	Regionalliga Südwest	2	0	—		—		—		—		2	0
Schalke 04	2014–15	Bundesliga	31	9	1	0	—		8 (Note: Appearance(s) in UEFA Champions League)	1	—		40	10
Schalke 04	2015–16	Bundesliga	28	6	2	0	—		6	3	—		36	9
Schalke 04	2016–17	Bundesliga	23	3	2	0	—		5	0	—		30	3
Schalke 04	Total		82	18	5	0	—		19	4	—		106	22
Stoke City	2017–18	Premier League	30	5	1	0	1	0	—		—		32	5
Paris Saint-Germain	2018–19	Ligue 1	22	3	4	0	1	0	4	0	0	0	31	3
Paris Saint-Germain	2019–20	Ligue 1	9	3	3	1	2	1	6	1	0	0	20	6
Paris Saint-Germain	Total		31	6	7	1	3	1	10	1	0	0	51	9
Bayern Munich	2020–21	Bundesliga	22	3	1	2	—		7	4	2 (Note: Appearances in FIFA Club World Cup)	0	32	9
Bayern Munich	2021–22	Bundesliga	20	4	1	4	—		4	1	1 (Note: Appearance in DFL-Supercup)	0	26	9
Bayern Munich	2022–23	Bundesliga	19	10	4	3	—		7	4	0	0	30	17
Bayern Munich	2023–24	Bundesliga	26	2	2	1	—		5	0	0	0	34	3
Bayern Munich	Total		88	19	8	10	—		23	9	3	0	122	38
New York Red Bulls	2025	Major League Soccer	33	17	3	1	—		—		2 (Note: Appearances in Leagues Cup)	0	38	18
New York Red Bulls	2026	Major League Soccer	22	5	1	0	—		—		—		23	5
New York Red Bulls	Total		55	22	4	1	—		—		2	0	61	23
Career total			441	98	38	15	4	1	60	16	8	1	561	131

=== International ===
As of match played 13 October 2025

Appearances and goals by national team and year
National team	Year	Apps	Goals
Cameroon	2010	6	2
Cameroon	2011	7	2
Cameroon	2012	6	5
Cameroon	2013	3	0
Cameroon	2014	12	3
Cameroon	2015	7	0
Cameroon	2016	2	1
Cameroon	2017	2	0
Cameroon	2018	4	1
Cameroon	2019	6	1
Cameroon	2020	0	0
Cameroon	2021	6	2
Cameroon	2022	11	3
Cameroon	2023	1	0
Cameroon	2024	0	0
Cameroon	2025	3	0
Total		76	20

As of match played 28 November 2022. Cameroon score listed first, score column indicates score after each Choupo-Moting goal.

International goals by date, venue, cap, opponent, score, result and competition
No.	Date	Venue	Cap	Opponent	Score	Result	Competition
1	5 June 2010	Partizan Stadium, Belgrade, Serbia	2	Serbia	3–4	3–4	Friendly
2	4 September 2010	Stade Anjalay, Belle Vue, Mauritius	6	Mauritius	3–1	3–1	2012 African Cup of Nations qualification
3	3 September 2011	Ahmadou Ahidjo Stadium, Yaoundé, Cameroon	11	Mauritius	5–0	5–0	2012 African Cup of Nations qualification
4	7 October 2011	Stade des Martyrs, Kinshasa, DR Congo	12	DR Congo	3–2	3–2	2012 African Cup of Nations qualification
5	29 February 2012	Estádio Lino Correia, Bissau, Guinea-Bissau	14	Guinea-Bissau	1–0	1–0	2013 Africa Cup of Nations qualification
6	26 May 2012	Stade Armand Micheletti, Amanvillers, France	15	Guinea	1–0	2–1	Friendly
7	26 May 2012	Stade Armand Micheletti, Amanvillers, France	15	Guinea	2–1	2–1	Friendly
8	2 June 2012	Ahmadou Ahidjo Stadium, Yaoundé, Cameroon	16	DR Congo	1–0	1–0	2014 FIFA World Cup qualification
9	10 June 2012	Stade Taïeb Mhiri, Sfax, Tunisia	17	Libya	1–1	1–2	2014 FIFA World Cup qualification
10	26 May 2014	Kufstein-Arena, Kufstein, Austria	24	Macedonia	2–0	2–0	Friendly
11	29 May 2014	Kufstein-Arena, Kufstein, Austria	25	Paraguay	1–2	1–2	Friendly
12	1 June 2014	Borussia-Park, Mönchengladbach, Germany	26	Germany	2–2	2–2	Friendly
13	30 May 2016	Stade de la Beaujoire, Nantes, France	42	France	2–2	2–3	Friendly
14	12 October 2018	Ahmadou Ahidjo Stadium, Yaoundé, Cameroon	47	Malawi	1–0	1–0	2019 Africa Cup of Nations qualification
15	23 March 2019	Ahmadou Ahidjo Stadium, Yaoundé, Cameroon	50	Comoros	1–0	3–0	2019 Africa Cup of Nations qualification
16	8 October 2021	Japoma Stadium, Douala, Cameroon	59	Mozambique	1–0	3–1	2022 FIFA World Cup qualification
17	8 October 2021	Japoma Stadium, Douala, Cameroon	59	Mozambique	2–0	3–1	2022 FIFA World Cup qualification
18	29 March 2022	Mustapha Tchaker Stadium, Blida, Algeria	67	Algeria	1–0	2–1 (a.e.t.)	2022 FIFA World Cup qualification
19	18 November 2022	Mohammed bin Zayed Stadium, Abu Dhabi, United Arab Emirates	69	Panama	1–0	1–1	Friendly
20	28 November 2022	Al Janoub Stadium, Al Wakrah, Qatar	71	Serbia	3–3	3–3	2022 FIFA World Cup

== Honours ==
Paris Saint-Germain

- Ligue 1: 2018–19, 2019–20
- Coupe de France: 2019–20; runner-up: 2018–19
- Coupe de la Ligue: 2019–20
- UEFA Champions League runner-up: 2019–20

Bayern Munich

- Bundesliga: 2020–21, 2021–22, 2022–23
- DFL-Supercup: 2021, 2022
- FIFA Club World Cup: 2020

Cameroon

- African Cup of Nations third place: 2021

Individual

- Fritz Walter Medal U18 Silver: 2007
