= Frankenberg, Saxony =

Frankenberg
- Town
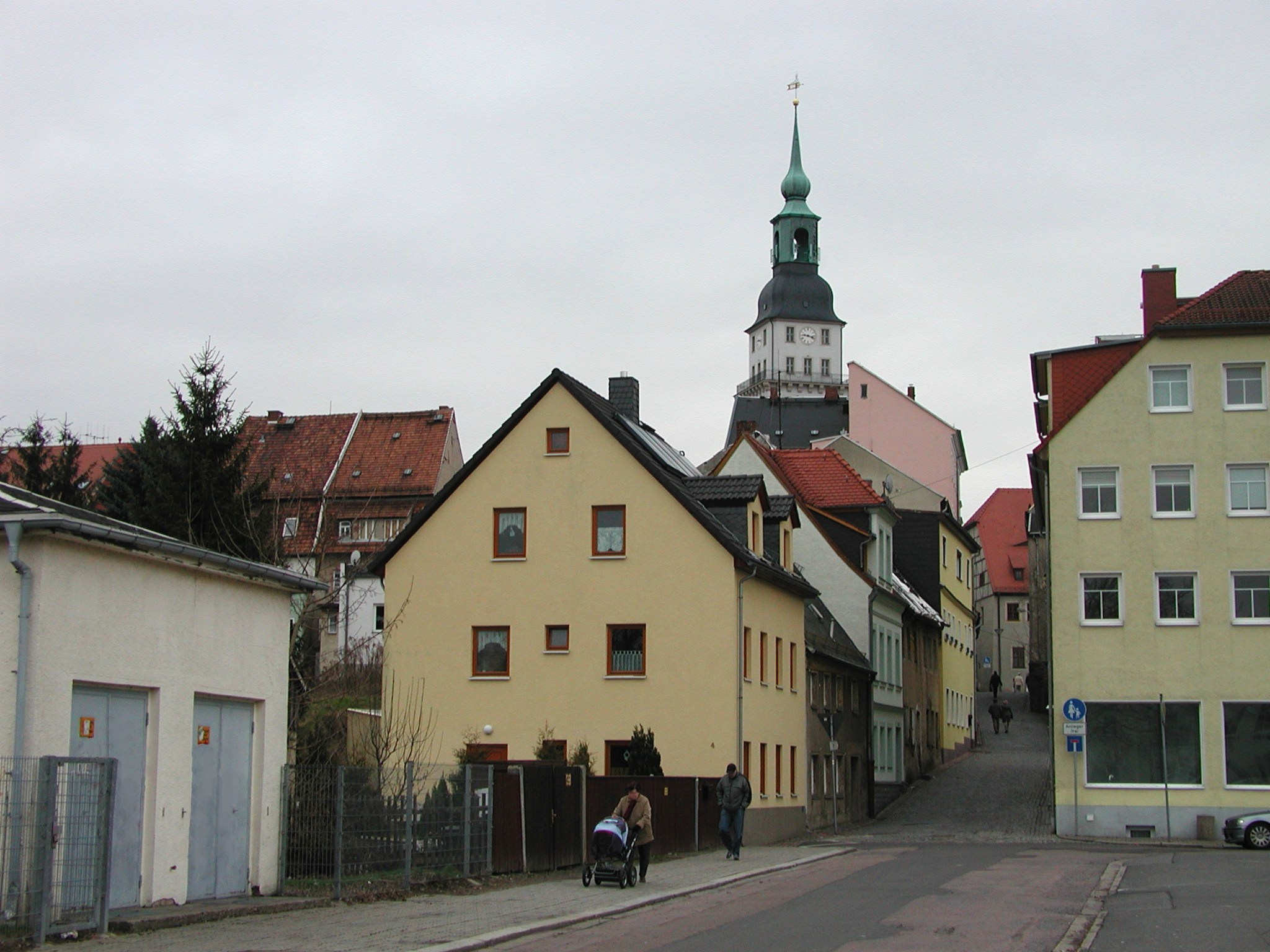
- View from the town

- Coat of arms

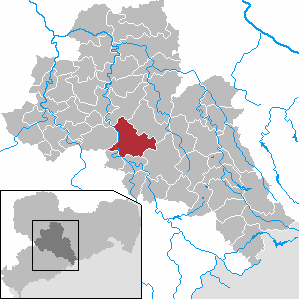
- Location of Frankenberg within Mittelsachsen district
- Interactive map of Frankenberg
- Location within Germany Location within Saxony
- Coordinates: 50°54′39″N 13°2′16″E
- Country: Germany
- State: Saxony
- District: Mittelsachsen

Government
  - Mayor (2023–30): Oliver Gerstner (CDU)

Area
  - Total: 65.62 km^{2} (25.34 sq mi)
- Elevation: 262 m (860 ft)

Population (2025-12-31)
  - Total: 13,635
  - Density: 207.8/km^{2} (538.2/sq mi)
- Time zone: UTC+01:00 (CET)
  - Summer (DST): UTC+02:00 (CEST)
- Postal codes: 09669
- Dialling codes: 037206
- Vehicle registration: FG
- Website: www.frankenberg-sachsen.de

Frankenberg (German pronunciation: [ˈfʁaŋkn̩ˌbɛʁk]; also: Frankenberg/Sa.) is a town in the district of Mittelsachsen, in Saxony, Germany. It is situated on the river Zschopau, 12 km (7.46 mi) northeast of Chemnitz, and some 40 km (24.85 mi) north of the border to the Czech Republic.

It was the site of the Nazi concentration camp Sachsenburg.

== Sons and daughters of the city ==
- Christian Gottlob Höpner (1799–1859), composer and organist
- Franz Kuhn (1884-1961), lawyer, sinologist and translator
- Eberhard Vogel (born 1943), record footballer of the GDR
- Jochen Sachse (born 1948), hammer thrower and Olympic medalist
- Sonja Morgenstern (born 1955), figure skater
- Matthias Weichert (born 1955), operatic baritone
- Anett Fiebig (born 1961), swimmer
- Anja Möllenbeck (born 1972), discus thrower
- Susan Leithoff (born 1979), politician
- Peer Kluge (born 1980), footballer
