= O ewiges Feuer, o Ursprung der Liebe, BWV 34a =

Incomplete wedding cantata composed by Johann Sebastian Bach

O ewiges Feuer, o Ursprung der Liebe (O eternal fire, o source of love), BWV 34.2 (formerly BWV 34a) is an incomplete wedding cantata composed by Johann Sebastian Bach, of which only the complete libretto and some parts (movements 2, 3 and 6) have survived.

== History and text ==
The cantata was composed in Leipzig most likely in 1725 or 1726, or 1727 or later, as a wedding commission, and performed shortly after its composition. As the choral numbers are lost, it is unknown whether any chorale theme had been used by Bach as inspiration for the writing.

The libretto, by an unknown author, is partly based on scripture. Specifically, movements 3 and 4 set verses from Psalm 128 (Psalms 128:4–6), whereas the text of the final chorale is drawn from the biblical Book of Numbers (Numbers 6:24–26).

== Scoring and structure ==
The piece is scored for four vocal soloists (soprano, alto, tenor, bass) and four-part choir, two oboes, two flauti traversi, timpani (tamburi), three trumpets (trombe) in D, two violins, viola, and basso continuo.

The cantata has seven movements, divided in two parts (four movements performed before the sermon, and the remaining three afterwards):

Part 1

1. Coro: O ewiges Feuer, o Ursprung der Liebe
2. Recitative (bass): Wie, dass der Liebe hohe Kraft
3. Aria (for tenor) and Recitative (for alto): Siehe, also wird gesegnet der Mann, der den Herren fürchtet
4. Coro: Friede über Israel

Part 2

5. Aria (alto): Wohl euch, ihr auserwählten Schafe
6. Recitative (soprano): Das ist vor dich, o ehrenwürdger Mann
7. Coro: Gib, höchster Gott, auch hier dem Worte Kraft

== Music ==
The opening chorus draws on imagery of eternal fire, represented in the strings. This is followed by a short secco bass recitative ending on an imperfect B minor cadence. The third movement exists only in reconstructed forms; it likely opened with strings and continuo. Its structure oddly alternates between aria and recitative episodes. The chorus appeals for peace.

The second part opens with an alto aria that also appears in BWV 34.1. It includes an accompaniment of flute and muted violin in octaves. A brief secco soprano recitative leads into the closing chorus for which only soprano and bass parts are extant. As a result, it is unclear what role the other voices would play in the movement.

== Recordings ==
- Gächinger Kantorei, Bach-Collegium Stuttgart, Helmuth Rilling. Edition Bachakademie Vol. 140 – Sacred Vocal Works/Magnificat BWV 243a. Hänssler

== Sources ==
- O ewiges Feuer, o Ursprung der Liebe, BWV 34a: Scores at the International Music Score Library Project
- J. C. J. Day. The texts of Bach's Church cantatas: some observations. German Life and Letters, volume 13 (1960), num. 2, pages 137–144.
- Alfred Dürr: Johann Sebastian Bach: Die Kantaten. Bärenreiter, Kassel 1999, ISBN 3-7618-1476-3
- Alfred Dürr: The Cantatas of J.S. Bach, Oxford University Press, 2006. ISBN 0-19-929776-2
- Werner Neumann: Handbuch der Kantaten J.S.Bachs, 1947, 5th Ed. 1984, ISBN 3-7651-0054-4
- Hans-Joachim Schulze: Die Bach-Kantaten: Einführungen zu sämtlichen Kantaten Johann Sebastian Bachs. Leipzig: Evangelische Verlags-Anstalt; Stuttgart: Carus-Verlag 2006 (Edition Bach-Archiv Leipzig) ISBN 3-374-02390-8 (Evang. Verl.-Anst.), ISBN 3-89948-073-2 (Carus-Verl.)
- Geoffrey Turner. Singing The Word: The Cantatas of J S Bach. New Blackfriars, volume 87, issue 1008, pages 144–154.
- Christoph Wolff/Ton Koopman (Eds.): Die Welt der Bach-Kantaten, Metzler/Bärenreiter, Stuttgart und Kassel, 3 Bände Sonderausgabe 2006 ISBN 3-476-02127-0
