= Peer Kluge =

German footballer (born 1980)

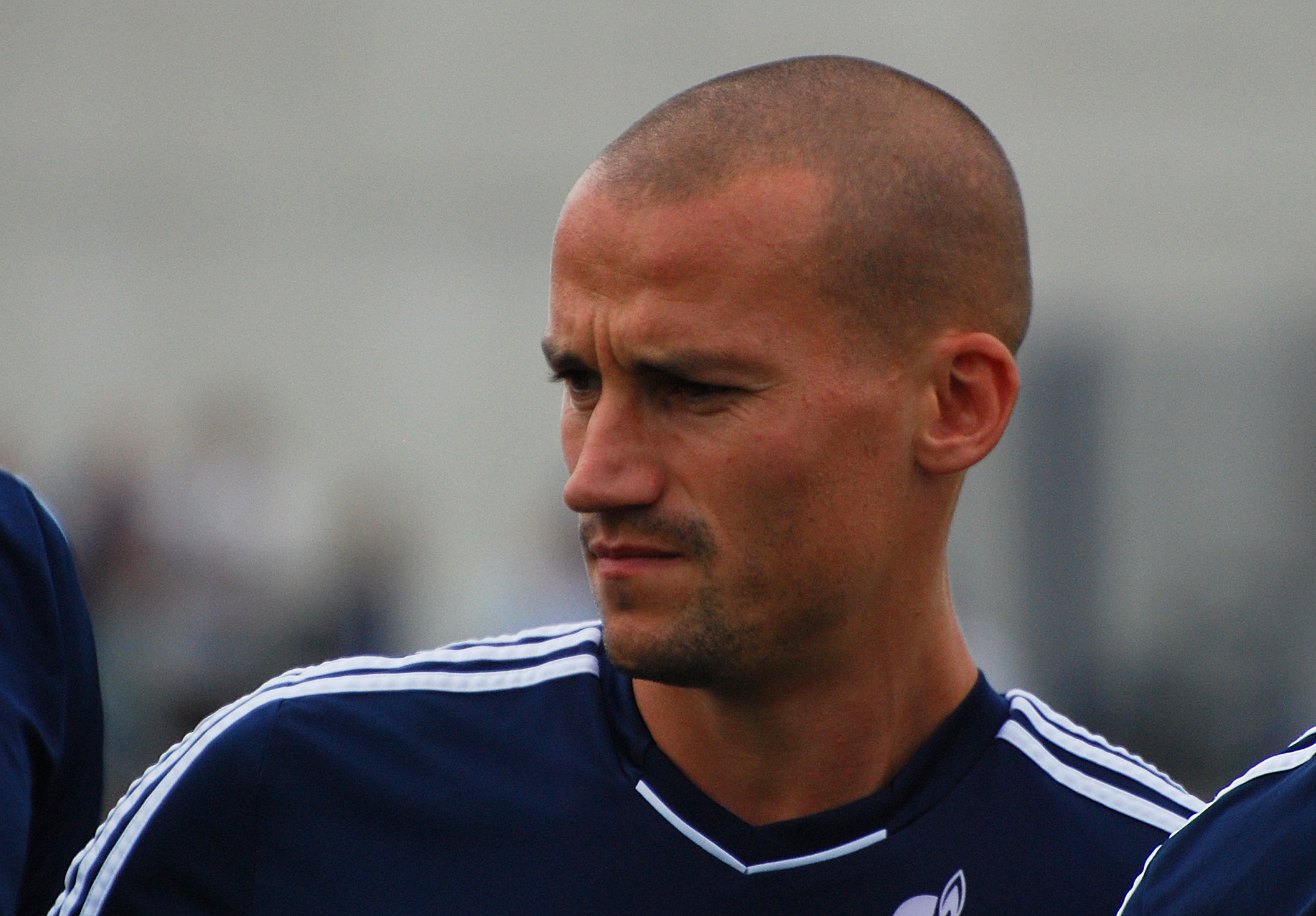
- Peer Kluge with Schalke 04 in 2011

Personal information
- Date of birth: 22 November 1980 (age 45)
- Place of birth: Frankenberg, East Germany
- Height: 1.79 m (5 ft 10 in)
- Position: Midfielder

Youth career
- Chemnitzer FC

Senior career*
Years	Team	Apps	(Gls)
1999–2001	Chemnitzer FC	42	(1)
2001–2007	Borussia Mönchengladbach	141	(9)
2001–2007	Borussia Mönchengladbach II	1	(0)
2007–2009	1. FC Nürnberg	67	(9)
2010–2012	Schalke 04	38	(1)
2012–2014	Hertha BSC	29	(3)
2013–2014	Hertha BSC II	2	(0)
2014–2016	Arminia Bielefeld	8	(0)
Total		328	(23)

International career
2004	Germany B	2	(0)
- * Club domestic league appearances and goals

Peer Kluge (born 22 November 1980) is a German former professional footballer who played as a midfielder.

== Career ==
Kluge played for Chemnitzer FC, Borussia Mönchengladbach, 1. FC Nürnberg and Schalke 04 before signing for Hertha BSC.

== Career statistics ==
Appearances and goals by club, season and competition
Club	Season	League			Cup		Continental		Other		Total	
Club	Season	Division	Apps	Goals	Apps	Goals	Apps	Goals	Apps	Goals	Apps	Goals
Chemnitzer FC	1999–2000	2. Bundesliga	11	0	1	0	—		—		12	0
Chemnitzer FC	2000–01	2. Bundesliga	31	1	1	0	—		—		32	1
Chemnitzer FC	Total		42	1	2	0	0	0	0	0	44	1
Borussia Mönchengladbach	2001–02	Bundesliga	10	0	0	0	—		—		10	0
Borussia Mönchengladbach	2002–03	Bundesliga	24	2	0	0	—		—		24	2
Borussia Mönchengladbach	2003–04	Bundesliga	22	0	3	0	—		—		25	0
Borussia Mönchengladbach	2004–05	Bundesliga	32	2	0	0	—		—		32	2
Borussia Mönchengladbach	2005–06	Bundesliga	28	3	2	0	—		—		30	3
Borussia Mönchengladbach	2006–07	Bundesliga	25	2	1	0	—		—		26	2
Borussia Mönchengladbach	Total		141	9	6	0	0	0	0	0	147	9
Borussia Mönchengladbach II	2006–07	Regionalliga Nord	1	0	—		—		—		1	0
1. FC Nürnberg	2007–08	Bundesliga	22	3	0	0	7	1	0	0	29	4
1. FC Nürnberg	2008–09	2. Bundesliga	28	4	0	0	—		2	0	30	4
1. FC Nürnberg	2009–10	Bundesliga	17	2	2	1	—		—		19	3
1. FC Nürnberg	Total		67	9	2	1	7	1	2	0	78	11
Schalke 04	2009–10	Bundesliga	13	0	1	0	—		—		14	0
Schalke 04	2010–11	Bundesliga	22	1	4	0	8	0	1	0	35	1
Schalke 04	2011–12	Bundesliga	3	0	0	0	0	0	0	0	3	0
Schalke 04	Total		38	1	5	0	8	0	1	0	52	1
Hertha BSC	2012–13	2. Bundesliga	27	3	0	0	—		—		27	3
Hertha BSC	2013–14	Bundesliga	2	0	1	0	—		—		3	0
Hertha BSC	Total		29	3	1	0	0	0	0	0	30	3
Hertha BSC II	2013–14	Regionalliga Nordost	2	0	—		—		—		2	0
Arminia Bielefeld	2014–15	3. Liga	8	0	2	0	—		—		10	0
Career total			328	23	18	1	15	1	3	0	364	25

== Honours ==
Schalke 04

- DFB-Pokal: 2010–11
- DFL-Supercup: 2011
