= Matthias Weichert =

German opera singer

Matthias Weichert (born in 1955) is a German operatic baritone and vocal teacher.

== Life and career ==
Born in Frankenberg, Weichert attended the St. Thomas School, Leipzig from 1965 to 1974. Subsequently, he studied singing at the Hochschule für Musik Carl Maria von Weber until 1981. He sang at the Landesbühnen Sachsen and the Belgian National Opera La Monnaie. He was also a guest at the Komische Oper Berlin, the Staatsoper Berlin and the Leipzig Opera. Since 2000 he has been a freelance concert and oratorio singer. In 1997, he became a lecturer at the Hochschule für Kirchenmusik Dresden and in 2002 professor for singing at the Hochschule für Musik Carl Maria von Weber Dresden.
