= Alexander Stephan (footballer) =

German footballer

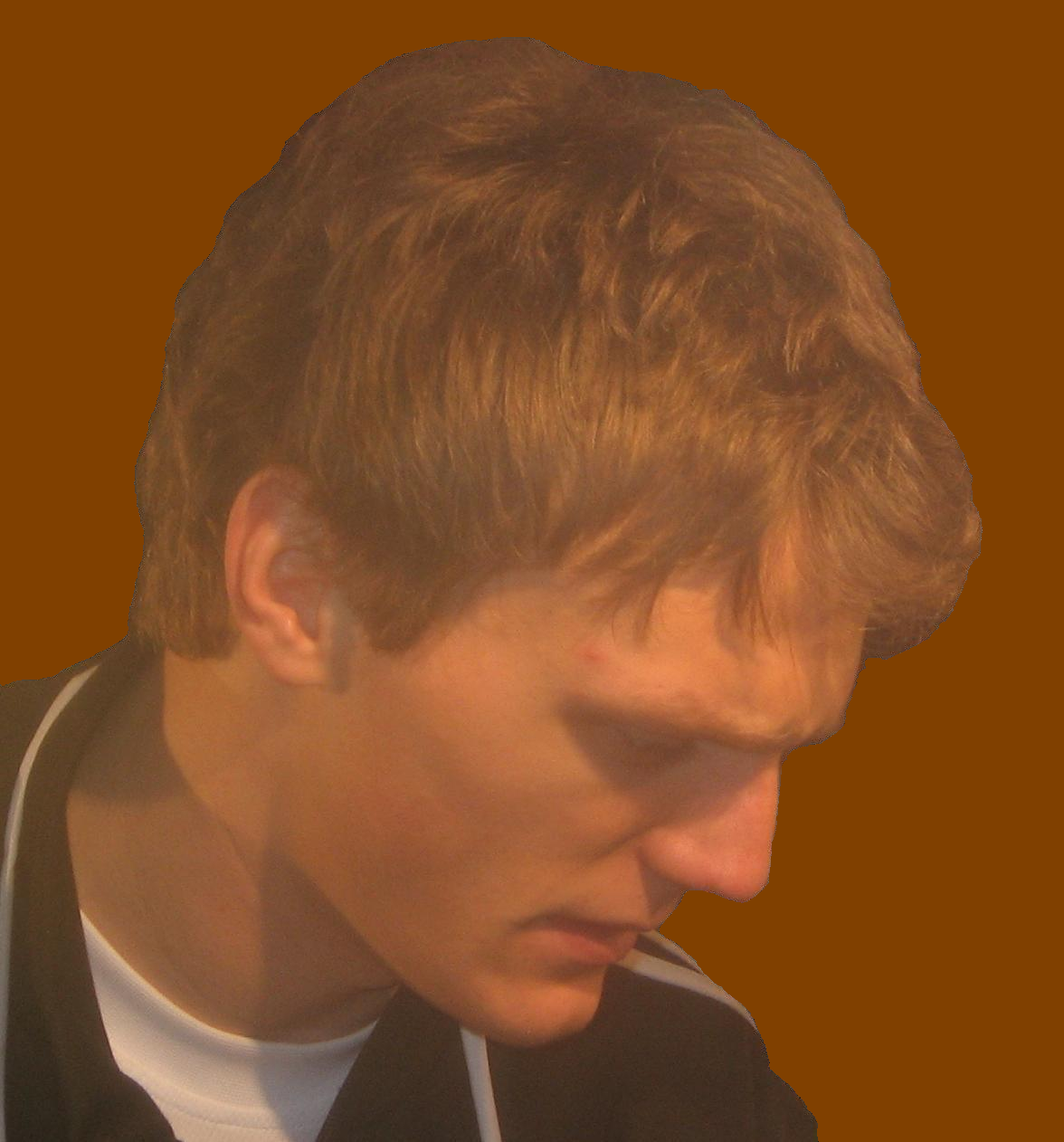
- Alexander Stephan 2007

Personal information
- Date of birth: 15 September 1986 (age 40)
- Place of birth: Erlangen, West Germany
- Height: 1.89 m (6 ft 2 in)
- Position: Goalkeeper

Youth career
- –1996: ASV Niederndorf
- 1996–2005: 1. FC Nürnberg

Senior career*
| Years | Team | Apps | (Gls) |
| 2005–2016 | 1. FC Nuremberg II | 109 | (0) |
| 2006–2014 | 1. FC Nürnberg | 14 | (0) |
| Total | | 123 | (0) |

International career
| 2004 | Germany U-19 | 1 | (0) |
- * Club domestic league appearances and goals as of 17:52, 30 November 2015 (UTC)

Alexander Stephan (born 15 September 1986 in Erlangen, West Germany), is a German former footballer who played for 1. FC Nuremberg II as a goalkeeper.

== International career ==
He has represented the Germany U19 team on one occasion.

== Honours ==
- DFB-Pokal:
  - Winner: 2006–07
