= 2012–13 FC St. Pauli season =

FC St. Pauli
2012–13 season
- Chairman: Stefan Orth
- Manager: Michael Frontzeck
- Stadium: Millerntor-Stadion, Hamburg, Germany
- 2. Bundesliga: 10th
- DFB-Pokal: Second round
Home colours	Away colours	Third colours

The 2012–13 FC St. Pauli season was the 102nd season in the club's football history. In 2012–13 the club played in the 2. Bundesliga, the second tier of German football. It was the clubs second consecutive season in the league, having played at this level since 2011–12, after it was relegated from the Bundesliga in 2012.

The club also took part in the 2012–13 edition of the DFB-Pokal, the German Cup, where it reached the second round and faced Bundesliga side VfB Stuttgart.

== Matches ==
=== Legend ===
Win Draw Loss Postponed

=== Friendly matches ===
29 June 2012	Heide	1–4	St. Pauli	Heide
18:30	56'	Report (in German)	Sağlık 29'; Ginczek 31'; Andrijanić 71'; Kalla 84'	Stadium: Stadion an der Meldorfer Straße; Attendance: 2,000

1 July 2012	Koldinger SV	1–7	St. Pauli	Pattensen
14:00	Johannes Kaminski 72'	Report 1 (in German); Report 2 (in German)	Ginczek 4', 30', 34'; Boll 8'; Bruns 18' (pen.); Bartels 26'; Ebbers 47'	Stadium: Sportplatz Koldinger SV; Attendance: 1,250; Referee: Marco Gewecke

7 July 2012	Sparta Werlte	0–4	St. Pauli	Werlte
14:00		Report 1 (in German); Report 2 (in German)	Thy 10'; Sağlık 18'; Ebbers 50'; Ginczek 88'	Stadium: Volksbank Stadion; Attendance: 2,000

10 July 2012	St. Pauli	3–1	Wolfsburg	Flensburg
19:00	Knoche 34'	Report (in German)	Bruns 54'; Langlitz 60'; Sağlık 90'	Stadium: Streichmühle; Attendance: 2,500

28 July 2012	St. Pauli	1–1	Aberdeen	Hamburg
15:30	Ebbers 63'	AFC; Report (in German)	McGinn 71'	Stadium: Millerntor-Stadion; Attendance: 8,402; Referee: Patrick Ittrich

=== 2. Bundesliga ===
3 August 2012 1	Erzgebirge Aue	0–0	St. Pauli	Aue
18:00 CEST (UTC+02:00)		Report (in German)	(yellow card) 82' Thorandt; (yellow card) 87' Bartels	Stadium: Sparkassen-Erzgebirgsstadion; Attendance: 12,200; Referee: Michael Weiner (Giesen)

11 August 2012 2	St. Pauli	1–1	Ingolstadt 04	Hamburg
15:30 CEST (UTC+02:00)	Mohr 56'	Report (in German)	55', (yellow card) 67' Eigler; (yellow card) 72' Knasmüllner	Stadium: Millerntor-Stadion; Attendance: 18,309; Referee: Christian Dingert (Thallichtenberg)

25 August 2012 3	Energie Cottbus	2–0	St. Pauli	Cottbus
13:00 CEST (UTC+02:00)	Kruska (yellow card) 6'; Stiepermann 21'; Banović 66'; Sanogo (yellow card) 70'	Report (in German)	Ginczek (yellow card) 32'; Thorandt (yellow card) 50'	Stadium: Stadion der Freundschaft; Attendance: 11,190; Referee: Wolfgang Stark (Ergolding)

1 September 2012 4	St. Pauli	2–1	Sandhausen	Hamburg
13:00 CEST (UTC+02:00)	Bartels 71'; Ebbers 78'	Report (in German)	Merena (yellow card) 39'; Achenbach (yellow card) 78'; Pischorn 83'	Stadium: Millerntor-Stadion; Attendance: 21,045; Referee: Felix Brych (München)

17 September 2012 5	Köln	0–0	St. Pauli	Köln
20:15 CEST (UTC+02:00)	Matuschyk (yellow card) 16'	Report (in German)		Stadium: RheinEnergieStadion; Attendance: 45,200; Referee: Tobias Welz (Wiesbaden)

21 September 2012 6	FSV Frankfurt	2–1	St. Pauli	Frankfurt
18:00 CEST (UTC+02:00)	Roshi 7'; Kapllani 62'; Klandt (yellow card) 90'	Report (in German)	Ginczek 58'; Schachten (yellow card) 76'	Stadium: Frankfurter Volksbank Stadion; Attendance: 8,849; Referee: Thorsten Schriever (Dorum)

25 September 2012 7	St. Pauli	0–1	Aalen	Hamburg
17:30 CEST (UTC+02:00)	Ginczek (yellow card) 43'; Bartels (yellow card) 90+1'	Report (in German)	Hübner 45+1'; Haller (yellow card) 69'; Aydemir (yellow card) 84'	Stadium: Millerntor-Stadion; Attendance: 20,932; Referee: Christian Leicher (Landshut)

28 September 2012 8	Jahn Regensburg	3–0	St. Pauli	Regensburg
17:30 CEST (UTC+02:00)	Sembolo 24', 55', (yellow card) 71'; Müller 44'	Report (in German)	Daube (yellow card) 39'; Bartels (yellow card) 57'; Mohr (yellow card) 67'; Thorandt (yellow card) 71'	Stadium: Jahnstadion; Attendance: 12,183; Referee: Frank Willenborg (Osnabrück)

5 October 2012 9	St. Pauli	2–2	Union Berlin	Hamburg
18:00 CEST (UTC+02:00)	Schachten (yellow card) 42'; Mohr 48'; Bartels 69'; Ginczek (yellow card) 70'	Report (in German)	Mattuschka 21', 84'; Kohlmann (yellow card) 86'	Stadium: Millerntor-Stadion; Attendance: 21,045; Referee: Bastian Dankert (Rostock)

21 October 2012 10	Paderborn 07	1–1	St. Pauli	Paderborn
13:30 CEST (UTC+02:00)	Brückner (yellow card) 63'; Naki 71'; Daube (yellow card) 85'	Report (in German)	Ginczek 48', (yellow card) 49'; Demme (yellow card) 75'	Stadium: Benteler Arena; Attendance: 15,000; Referee: Martin Petersen (Stuttgart)

28 October 2012 11	St. Pauli	3–2	Dynamo Dresden	Hamburg
13:30 CEST (UTC+02:00)	Boll 45'; Avevor 49'; Ginczek 55'; Thorandt (yellow card) 60'	Report (in German)	Ouali 18'; Poté 28'; Losilla (yellow card) 75'; Thoelke (yellow card) 90+1'	Stadium: Millerntorn-Stadion; Attendance: 21,045; Referee: Manuel Gräfe (Berlin)

3 November 2012 12	1860 München	0–2	St. Pauli	Munich
13:00 CEST (UTC+02:00)	Bierofka (yellow card) 22'; Aygün (yellow card) 83'; Makos (yellow card) 86'	Report (in German)	Boll 26'; Buchtmann (yellow card) 49'; Ginczek 53'; Schindler (yellow card) 85'	Stadium: Allianz Arena; Attendance: 31,500; Referee: Marco Fritz (Korb)

12 November 2012 13	St. Pauli	1–1	Bochum	Hamburg
20:15 CET (UTC+01:00)	Ginczek 16'; Kalla (yellow card) 40'; Thorandt (yellow card) 56'	Report (in German)	Delura (yellow card) 39'; Dabrowski 55'; Dedić (yellow card) 90'	Stadium: Millerntor-Stadion; Attendance: 20,788; Referee: Christian Dingert (Lebecksmühle)

19 November 2012 14	Hertha BSC	1–0	St. Pauli	Berlin
20:15 CET (UTC+01:00)	Holland (yellow card) 39'; Niemeyer (yellow card) 72'; Sahar 85'	Report (in German)	Thy (yellow card) 90'	Stadium: Olympiastadion; Attendance: 39,127; Referee: Thorsten Kinhöfer (Herne)

25 November 2012 15	St. Pauli	4–1	MSV Duisburg	Hamburg
13:30 CET (UTC+01:00)	Ginczek 18', (yellow card) 24'; Bartels (yellow card) 51', (goal) 65', 74'; Thorandt (yellow card) 61'; Sağlık 89'	Report (in German)	Kern 45+1'; Pamić (yellow card) 49' (yellow-red card) 67'; Öztürk (yellow card) 86'	Stadium: Millerntor-Stadion; Attendance: 21,054; Referee: Sascha Stegmann (Niederkassel)

28 November 2012 16	Eintracht Braunschweig	1–0	St. Pauli	Braunschweig
17:30 CET (UTC+01:00)	Kumbela 17'; Kessel (yellow card) 79' (yellow-red card) 81'	Report (in German)	Bartels (red card) 22'; Schachten (yellow card) 54'; Avevor (yellow card) 65'	Stadium: Eintracht-Stadion; Attendance: 21,400; Referee: Felix Zwayer (Berlin)

1 December 2012 17	St. Pauli	1–0	Kaiserslautern	Hamburg
13:00 CET (UTC+01:00)	Schachten (yellow card) 53'; Ginczek 67'; Buchtmann (yellow card) 86'	Report (in German)	Idrissou (yellow card) 15'; Baumjohann (yellow card) 17'; Linsmayer (yellow card) 77'	Stadium: Millerntor-Stadion; Attendance: 21,045; Referee: Wolfgang Stark (Ergolding)

9 December 2012 18	St. Pauli	0–3	Erzgebirge Aue	Hamburg
13:30 CET (UTC+01:00)	Buchtmann (yellow card) 32'	Report (in German)	Klingbeil (yellow card) 1'; Schröder (yellow card) 37'; Könnecke (yellow card) 41'; Hochscheidt 49'; Fink (yellow card) 53'; Sylvestr 76'; Wiegel 89'	Stadium: Millerntor-Stadion; Attendance: 20,740; Referee: Peter Sippel (München)

15 December 2012 19	Ingolstadt 04	0–0	St. Pauli	Ingolstadt
13:30 CET (UTC+01:00)	Korkmaz (yellow card) 42'; Bernado (yellow card) 89'	Report (in German)	Funk (yellow card) 56'; Ginczek (yellow card) 87'	Stadium: Audi Sportpark; Attendance: 6,648; Referee: Jochen Drees (Münster-Sarmsheim)

3 February 2013 20	St. Pauli	0-0	Energie Cottbus	Hamburg
13:30 CET (UTC+01:00)	Bartels (yellow card) 51'	Report (in German)	Sørensen (yellow card) 70'; Schulze (yellow card) 90'	Stadium: Millerntor-Stadion; Attendance: 26,578; Referee: Jochen Drees (Münster-Sarmsheim)

10 February 2013 21	Sandhausen	4–1	St. Pauli	Sandhausen
13:30 CET (UTC+01:00)	Löning 3', 39'; Ulm 29' (pen.), (yellow card) 70'; Mäkelä 49'; Achenbach (yellow card) 57'	Report (in German)	Funk (yellow card) 44'; Kringe 74' (pen.)	Stadium: Hardtwaldstadion; Attendance: 7,600; Referee: Benjamin Brand (Gerolzhofen)

18 February 2013 22	St. Pauli	0–1	Köln	Hamburg
20:15 CET (UTC+01:00)	Thorandt (yellow card) 2' (yellow-red card) 43'; Ginczek (yellow card) 68'; Mohr (yellow card) 78' (yellow-red card) 90'; Boll (yellow card) 88'; Tschauner (yellow card) 90'	Report (in German)	Clemens 3'; McKenna (yellow card) 45'; Maroh (yellow card) 51'; Strobl (yellow card) 75'	Stadium: Millerntor-Stadion; Attendance: 29,063; Referee: Manuel Gräfe (Berlin)

22 February 2013 23	St. Pauli	3–0	FSV Frankfurt	Hamburg
18:00 CET (UTC+01:00)	Ginczek 28', 52', 76'	Report (in German)	Stark (yellow card) 67'; Konrad (yellow card) 68'	Stadium: Millerntor-Stadion; Attendance: 26,398; Referee: Robert Kempter (Sauldorf)

3 March 2013 24	Aalen	0–1	St. Pauli	Aalen
13:30 CET (UTC+01:00)	Hofmann (yellow card) 41'; Traut (yellow card) 55'; Kister (yellow card) 80'	Report (in German)	Funk (yellow card) 34'; Ginczek 90' (pen.); Boll (yellow card) 90'	Stadium: Scholz-Arena; Attendance: 11,185; Referee: Christian Leicher (Landshut)

8 March 2013 25	St. Pauli	3–2	Jahn Regensburg	Hamburg
18:00 CET (UTC+01:00)	Gogia 18'; Daube (yellow card) 37'; Kalla (yellow card) 41'; Ginczek 66', (red card) 87'; Avevor (yellow card) 76'; Bruns 90'	Report (in German)	Koke 23'; Nachreiner (yellow card) 58'; Kamavuaka 89'	Stadium: Millerntor-Stadion; Attendance: 27,074; Referee: Marcel Unger (Halle)

15 March 2013 26	Union Berlin	4–2	St. Pauli	Berlin
18:00 CET (UTC+01:00)	Terodde 20', 83'; Mattuschka 42'; Nemec 81'	Report (in German)	Ebbers 37'; Thorandt (yellow card) 56'; Schachten 76'	Stadium: Stadion An der Alten Försterei; Attendance: 21,410; Referee: Guido Winkmann (Kerken)

1 April 2013 27	St. Pauli	2–2	Paderborn 07	Hamburg
20:15 CEST (UTC+02:00)	Gyau (yellow card) 4'; Ebbers 53'; Schachten (yellow card) 81'; Thorandt (yellow card) 86'; Tschauner 90'; Bartels (yellow card) 90'	Report (in German)	Yılmaz 56'; Meha (yellow card) 73'; Sağlık 84'	Stadium: Millerntor-Stadion; Attendance: 28,278; Referee: Tobias Welz (Wiesbaden)

6 April 2013 28	Dynamo Dresden	3–2	St. Pauli	Dresden
13:00 CEST (UTC+02:00)	Solga (yellow card) 36'; Trojan 62', (yellow card) 63'; Losilla 66', (yellow card) 71'; Schuppan 77'; Müller (yellow card) 90'	Report (in German)	Mohr 50'; Ginczek 53'; Thorandt (yellow card) 86'	Stadium: Glücksgas Stadion; Attendance: 29,193; Referee: Thorsten Kinhöfer (Herne)

13 April 2013 29	St. Pauli	3–1	1860 München	Hamburg
13:00 CEST (UTC+02:00)	Ginczek 34'; Bartels 70', 74'; Schachten (yellow card) 90'	Report (in German)	Bülow (yellow card) 40'; Kiraly (yellow card) 66'; Friend 73'	Stadium: Millerntor-Stadion; Attendance: 28,892; Referee: Christian Fischer (Hemer)

19 April 2013 30	Bochum	3–0	St. Pauli	Bochum
18:00 CEST (UTC+02:00)	Dedić 25' (pen.), 37'; Tasaka 70'	Report (in German)	Ginczek (yellow card) 38'	Stadium: rewirpowerSTADION; Attendance: 26,072; Referee: Markus Schmidt (Stuttgart)

28 April 2013 31	St. Pauli	2–3	Hertha BSC	Hamburg
13:30 CEST (UTC+02:00)	Schachten (yellow card) 64'; Thy 66'; Ginczek 85' (pen.); Boll (yellow card) 86'; Bartels (yellow card) 90'	Report (in German)	Allagui 23', (yellow card) 43'; Kraft (yellow card) 32'; Franz (yellow card) 64'; Ronny 88'; Ndjeng (yellow card) 89'; Wagner 90'	Stadium: Millerntor-Stadion; Attendance: 29,063; Referee: Felix Brych (München)

5 May 2013 32	MSV Duisburg	0–0	St. Pauli	Duisburg
13:00 CEST (UTC+02:00)	Koch (yellow card) 37'; Wolze (yellow card) 76'; Perthel (yellow card) 86'	Report (in German)	Funk (yellow card) 88'	Stadium: Schauinsland-Reisen-Arena; Attendance: 18,239; Referee: Robert Kempter (Sauldorf)

12 May 2013 33	St. Pauli	5–1	Eintracht Braunschweig	Hamburg
13:30 CEST (UTC+02:00)	Ginczek 7', 11'; Bruns (yellow card) 40', (goal) 70'; Thorandt (yellow card) 52'; Bartels 68'; Kringe (yellow card) 69'; Ebbers 87'	Report (in German)	Korte 89'	Stadium: Millerntor-Stadion; Attendance: 29,063; Referee: Peter Gagelmann (Bremen)

19 May 2013 34	Kaiserslautern	1–2	St. Pauli	Kaiserslautern
13:30 CEST (UTC+02:00)	Hoffer 71'	Report (in German)	Daube 15', (yellow card) 39'; Ginczek 33'	Stadium: Fritz-Walter-Stadion; Attendance: 46,460; Referee: Robert Hartmann (Wangen im Allgäu)

=== DFB-Pokal ===
18 August 2012 1st Round	Offenburg	0–3	St. Pauli	Offenburg
15:30 CEST (UTC+02:00)		Report (in German)	Sağlık 23', 68'; Bartels 45+1'	Stadium: Karl-Heitz-Stadion; Attendance: 10,000; Referee: Christian Leicher (Landshut)

31 October 2012 2nd Round	Stuttgart	3–0	St. Pauli	Stuttgart
19:00 CET (UTC+01:00)	Ibišević (yellow card) 18', (goal) 22'; Traoré 21'; Hajnal 41'	Report (in German)	Kalla (yellow card) 53'	Stadium: Mercedes-Benz Arena; Attendance: 26,100; Referee: Peter Sippel (München)

== Squad and statistics ==
As of 6 December 2012

No.	Pos	Nat	Player	Total		Bundesliga		DFB-Pokal	
No.	Pos	Nat	Player	Apps	Goals	Apps	Goals	Apps	Goals
1	GK	(Germany) GER	Benedikt Pliquett	0	0	0	0	0	0
13	GK	(Germany) GER	Philipp Tschauner	19	0	17	0	2	0
23	GK	(Germany) GER	Florian Kirschke	0	0	0	0	0	0
30	GK	(Germany) GER	Robin Himmelmann	0	0	0	0	0	0
2	DF	(Germany) GER	Florian Kringe	12	0	12	0	0	0
5	DF	(Germany) GER	Christopher Avevor	16	1	14	1	2	0
16	DF	(Germany) GER	Markus Thorandt	18	0	16	0	2	0
20	DF	(Germany) GER	Sebastian Schachten	17	0	15	0	2	0
24	DF	(Germany) GER	Florian Mohr	14	2	12	2	2	0
26	DF	(Germany) GER	Sören Gonther	0	0	0	0	0	0
27	DF	(Germany) GER	Jan-Philipp Kalla	15	0	13	0	2	0
6	MF	(Germany) GER	Patrick Funk	17	0	15	0	2	0
7	MF	(Germany) GER	Dennis Daube	14	0	13	0	1	0
8	MF	(Germany) GER	Florian Bruns	9	0	8	0	1	0
10	MF	(Germany) GER	Christopher Buchtmann	9	0	8	0	1	0
14	MF	(Germany) GER	Akaki Gogia	12	0	11	0	1	0
15	MF	(United States) USA	Joseph-Claude Gyau	7	0	6	0	1	0
17	MF	(Germany) GER	Fabian Boll	11	2	9	2	2	0
22	MF	(Germany) GER	Fin Bartels	17	4	15	4	2	0
25	MF	(Germany) GER	Kevin Schindler	10	0	10	0	0	0
29	MF	(Bosnia and Herzegovina) BIH	Marcel Andrijanić	1	0	0	0	1	0
9	FW	(Germany) GER	Marius Ebbers	14	1	13	1	1	0
11	FW	(Germany) GER	Daniel Ginczek	17	8	16	7	1	1
18	FW	(Germany) GER	Lennart Thy	5	0	4	0	1	0
19	FW	(Turkey) TUR	Mahir Sağlık	11	3	10	1	1	2
