= 2010–11 FC St. Pauli season =

FC St. Pauli
2010–11 season
- Manager: Holger Stanislawski
- Stadium: Millerntor-Stadion
- Bundesliga: 18th (relegated)
- DFB-Pokal: First round

The 2010–11 season for FC St. Pauli was the 100th season in the football club's history. They were promoted from the 2. Bundesliga to the Bundesliga, the highest division of German football. It was their fifth stint in the league.

== Season summary ==
St Pauli was relegated from the Bundesliga after one season. Manager Holger Stanislawski had been appointed by Hoffenheim in April, to start from the next season. André Schubert of SC Paderborn 07 was recruited as his replacement.

== First-team squad ==
Squad at end of season

Note: Flags indicate national team as defined under FIFA eligibility rules; some limited exceptions apply. Players may hold more than one non-FIFA nationality.

No.	Pos.	Nation	Player
1	GK	(Germany) GER	Benedikt Pliquett
2	DF	(Germany) GER	Florian Lechner
3	DF	(Germany) GER	Hauke Brückner
4	DF	(Germany) GER	Fabio Morena
5	DF	(Peru) PER	Carlos Zambrano
6	DF	(Germany) GER	Bastian Oczipka (on loan from Bayer Leverkusen)
7	FW	(Germany) GER	Rouwen Hennings
8	MF	(Germany) GER	Florian Bruns
9	FW	(Germany) GER	Marius Ebbers
10	MF	(Germany) GER	Charles Takyi (Note: Takyi was born in Accra, Ghana, but was raised in Germany from the age of 5 and represented Germany at U-15, U-16, U-17 and U-18 level before making his international debut for Ghana in November 2011.)
11	DF	(Germany) GER	Ralph Gunesch (Note: Gunesch was born in Sighișoara, Romania, but was raised in Germany and represented Germany at U-19 and U-20 level.)
12	MF	(Germany) GER	Timo Schultz
13	FW	(Germany) GER	Gerald Asamoah (Note: Asamoah was born in Mampong, Ghana, but was raised in Germany from the age of 11 and made his international debut for Germany in May 2001.)
14	DF	(Germany) GER	Marcel Eger
16	DF	(Germany) GER	Markus Thorandt
17	MF	(Germany) GER	Fabian Boll

No.	Pos.	Nation	Player
18	FW	(Germany) GER	Max Kruse
19	FW	(Germany) GER	Richard Sukuta-Pasu (on loan from Bayer Leverkusen)
20	MF	(Germany) GER	Matthias Lehmann
22	MF	(Germany) GER	Fin Bartels
23	MF	(Germany) GER	Deniz Naki
24	DF	(Germany) GER	Carsten Rothenbach
25	GK	(Germany) GER	Mathias Hain
26	GK	(Germany) GER	Thomas Kessler (on loan from 1. FC Köln)
27	DF	(Germany) GER	Jan-Philipp Kalla
28	DF	(Germany) GER	Moritz Volz
30	MF	(Germany) GER	Dennis Daube
31	FW	(Turkey) TUR	Deniz Herber
33	DF	(Germany) GER	Matthias Hinzmann
34	GK	(Germany) GER	Arvid Schenk
35	DF	(Germany) GER	Petar Filipović

=== Left club during season ===
Note: Flags indicate national team as defined under FIFA eligibility rules; some limited exceptions apply. Players may hold more than one non-FIFA nationality.

No. / Pos. / Nation / Player; 29 / FW / (Germany) GER / Nils Pichinot (to Carl Zeiss Jena)	No. / Pos. / Nation / Player; 32 / DF / (Ghana) GHA / Davidson Eden (on loan to Esbjerg)
