= Philipp Tschauner =

German footballer

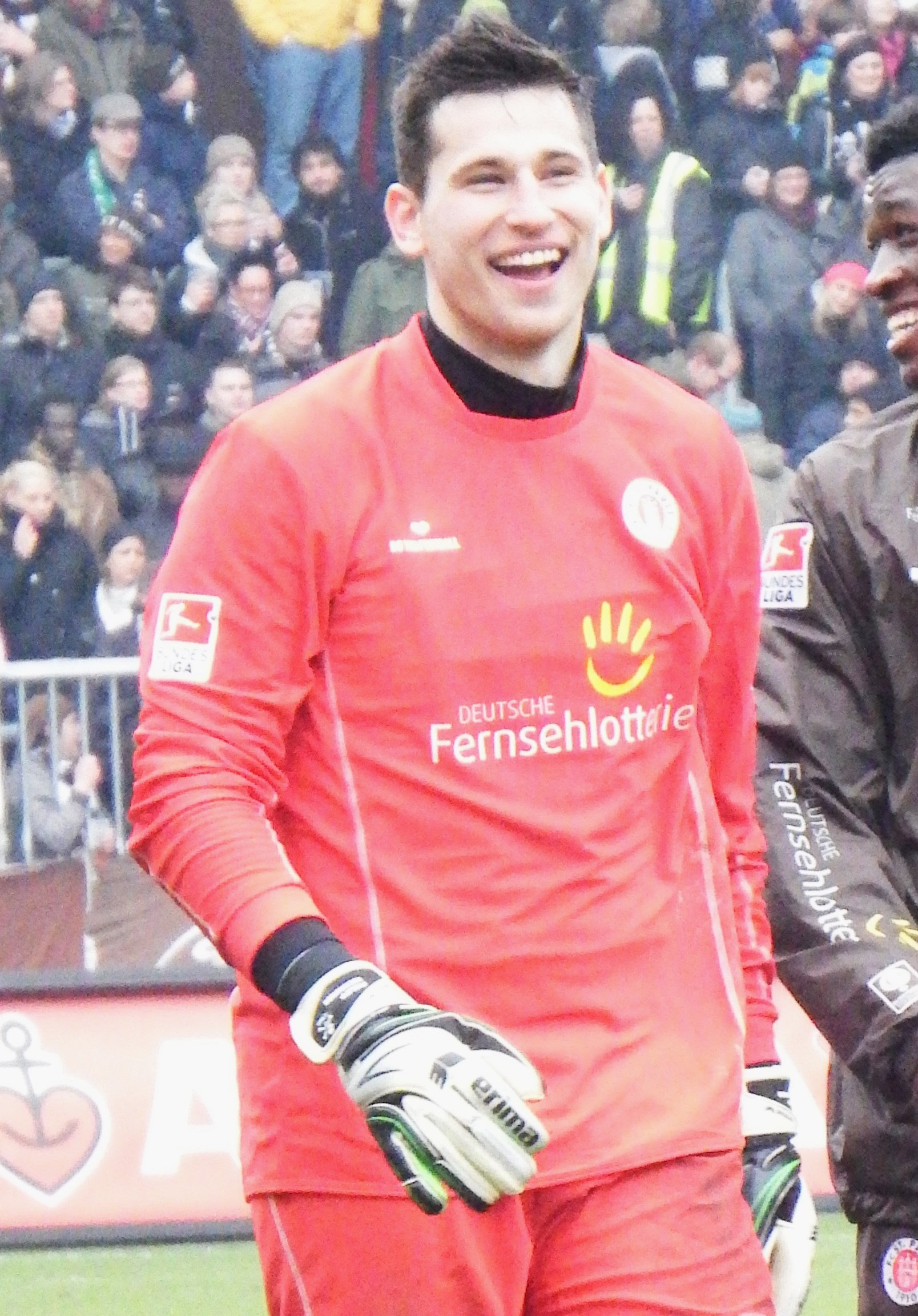
- Tschauner with FC St. Pauli in 2013

Personal information
- Date of birth: 3 November 1985 (age 40)
- Place of birth: Schwabach, West Germany
- Height: 1.96 m (6 ft 5 in)
- Position: Goalkeeper

Youth career
- 1994–1995: TSV Wendelstein
- 1995–2004: 1. FC Nürnberg

Senior career*
Years	Team	Apps	(Gls)
2004–2006	1. FC Nürnberg	1	(0)
2006–2011	1860 Munich II	40	(0)
2006–2011	1860 Munich	49	(0)
2011–2015	FC St. Pauli	104	(1)
2015–2019	Hannover 96	64	(0)
2019	→ FC Ingolstadt (loan)	16	(0)
2019–2022	RB Leipzig	1	(0)
Total		275	(0)

International career
2004–2006	Germany U20	9	(0)
2006	Germany U21	1	(0)
- * Club domestic league appearances and goals as of 14 May 2022

Philipp Tschauner (born 3 November 1985) is a German former professional footballer who played as a goalkeeper. During his career, he has played for 1. FC Nürnberg, 1860 Munich, FC St. Pauli, Hannover 96, FC Ingolstadt and RB Leipzig. Tschauner has played internationally for Germany nine times at under-20 and once at the under-21 level.

== Career ==
=== Youth and early in professional football in Nuremberg ===
After a year in the F-youth of TSV Wendelstein, Tschauner began his career in 1995 with the first 1. FC Nürnberg, where he went through all youth teams. Having already partially helped in the 2003–04 season in goal for the second team of the FCN, he was the third goalkeeper in 2004–05 for the pros and goalkeeper of Bayern League team 1. FC Nuremberg. On 22 October 2005 Tschauner's first game in the Bundesliga was against Arminia Bielefeld.

=== 1860 Munich ===
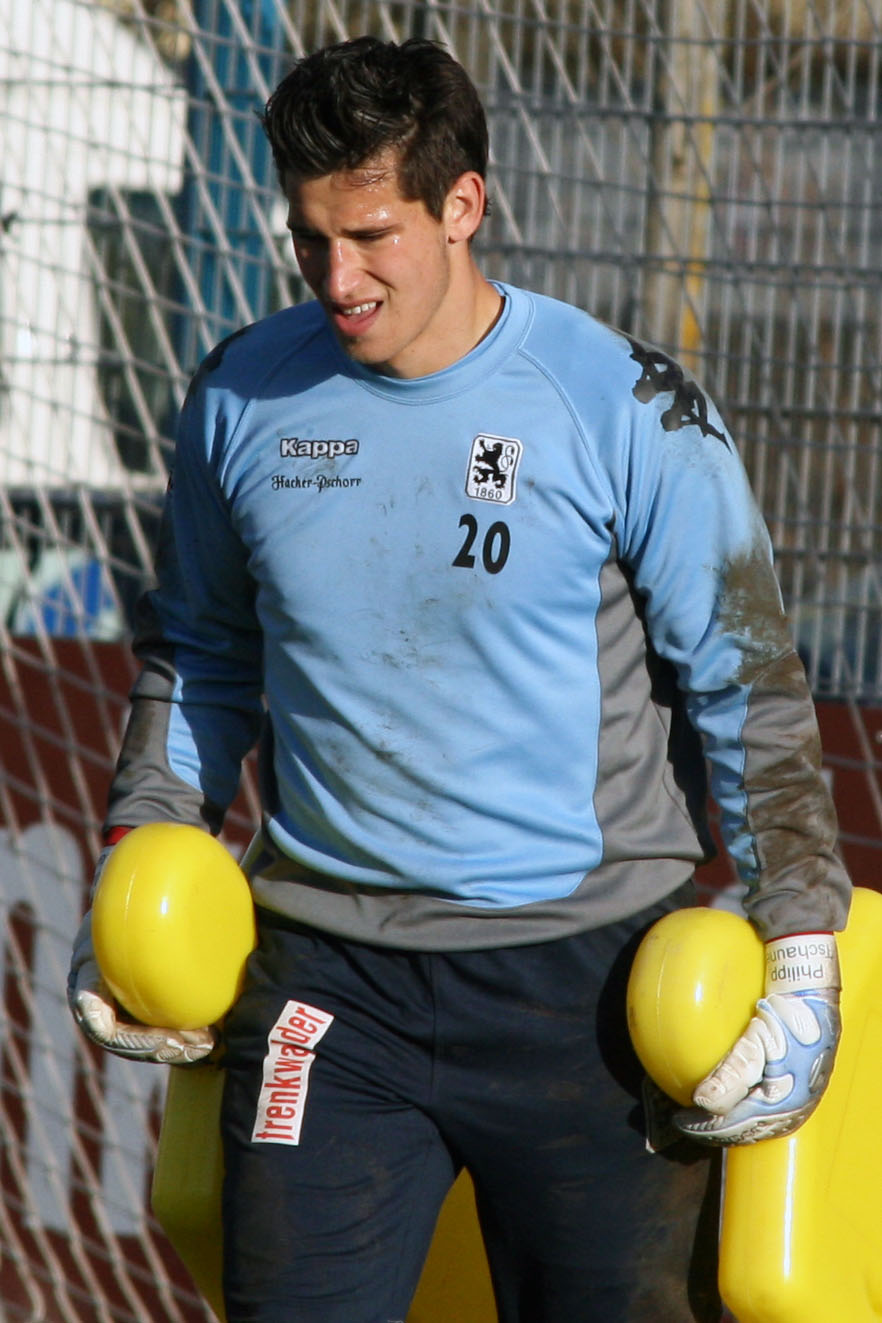
Tschauner in training for TSV 1860 Munich, 2007

In the summer of 2006 he moved to 1860 Munich, where he signed a three-year contract. During the 2006–07 season he served as the Regionalliga Süd U23 Lions goalkeeper, and made five appearances in the second division team of 1860 Munich, where he twice replaced Michael Hofmann, who had been injured.

In preparing for the 2007–08 season, coach Marco Kurz stated Tschauner would be primary goalkeeper before Hofmann. On match day however, Tschauner suffered a partial tear of the cruciate ligament in his left knee, so Hofmann replaced him. After being in goal for the Sechzger, Tschauner played in the role of the substitute goalkeeper for several months. On 27 February 2008, Hofmann was injured in the Cup derby against FC Bayern, with Tschauner then making a comeback. Afterward, he became the first choice for goalkeeper in the league. In March 2008, his contract was extended until 2011.

Tschauner also went into the following season (2008–09) as goalkeeper. But when Uwe Wolf replaced Kurz as coach in February 2009, Tschauner was forced to resign to a secondary role while Hofmann became goalkeeper again. However, Hofmann was again injured after the 30. Gameday, so at the end of the season Tschauner was goalkeeper again.

In the summer of 2009, the 1860 Munich took on Gábor Király and immediately declared him as goalkeeper. Tschauner was again assigned as replacement goalkeeper. During the 2009–10 season he played several times for the second team; he only played on the professional team on the final day. In the following season he sat out for 33 games and only played in the last home game. In total Tschauner sat out for 49 league and cup appearances, and was part of five 1860 games and 40 games for 1860 II.

=== FC St. Pauli ===
For the 2011–12 season Tschauner joined FC St. Pauli, where he signed a contract until 2013. There, he became an instant goalkeeper and took part in all 19 league games until in the last game before the winter break—a 2–0 win over Eintracht Frankfurt—he sustained an acromioclavicular injury, which made him unfit to play for several weeks.

On 1 April 2013, during the 27th round of the Bundesliga 2, Tschauner scored in the 90th minute of the 2–2 final against SC Paderborn 07 with a header after a corner kick from midfielder Dennis Daube.

=== Hannover 96 ===
On 14 May 2015, Tschauner signed a contract with the Bundesliga club Hannover 96.

On 2 January 2019, it was announced that he would join FC Ingolstadt on loan until the end of 2018–19 season.

=== RB Leipzig ===
On 30 July 2019, Tschauner joined RB Leipzig on a two-year contract. He retired from playing at the end of the 2021–22 season, after making a symbolic 3-minute appearance in a 4–0 victory against FC Augsburg on 8 May 2022 which became his first and last competitive RB Leipzig game.

== International career ==
Tschauner played ten times for the youth teams of the DFB. In 2004, he was on reserve for the U-19 European Championship. He later played in the U-20 team a total of nine times, and was also part of the German squad at the 2005 World Junior Championships. Tschauner also played as part of the U21 team on 15 August 2006 against the Netherlands.

== Career statistics ==
Appearances and goals by club, season and competition
Club	Season	League			DFB-Pokal		Europe		Other		Total		Ref.
Club	Season	Division	Apps	Goals	Apps	Goals	Apps	Goals	Apps	Goals	Apps	Goals	Ref.
1. FC Nürnberg	2005–06	Bundesliga	1	0	0	0	—		—		1	0	
1860 Munich	2006–07	2. Bundesliga	5	0	0	0	—		—		5	0	
1860 Munich	2007–08	2. Bundesliga	16	0	2	0	—		—		18	0	
1860 Munich	2008–09	2. Bundesliga	26	0	3	0	—		—		29	0	
1860 Munich	2009–10	2. Bundesliga	1	0	0	0	—		—		1	0	
1860 Munich	2010–11	2. Bundesliga	1	0	0	0	—		—		1	0	
1860 Munich	Total		49	0	5	0	—		—		54	0	—
1860 Munich II	2006–07	Regionalliga Süd	27	0	—		—		—		27	0	
1860 Munich II	2008–09	Regionalliga Süd	4	0	—		—		—		4	0	
1860 Munich II	2009–10	Regionalliga Süd	9	0	—		—		—		9	0	
1860 Munich II	Total		40	0	—		—		—		40	0	—
FC St. Pauli II	2011–12	Regionalliga Nord	2	0	—		—		—		2	0	
FC St. Pauli	2011–12	2. Bundesliga	24	0	0	0	—		—		24	0	
FC St. Pauli	2012–13	2. Bundesliga	33	1	2	0	—		—		35	1	
FC St. Pauli	2013–14	2. Bundesliga	32	0	1	0	—		—		33	0	
FC St. Pauli	2014–15	2. Bundesliga	15	0	2	0	—		—		17	0	
FC St. Pauli	Total		104	1	5	0	—		—		109	1	—
Hannover 96	2015–16	Bundesliga	0	0	0	0	—		—		0	0	
Hannover 96	2016–17	2. Bundesliga	32	0	0	0	—		—		32	0	
Hannover 96	2017–18	Bundesliga	31	0	1	0	—		—		32	0	
Hannover 96	2018–19	Bundesliga	1	0	1	0	—		—		2	0	
Hannover 96	Total		64	0	2	0	—		—		66	0	—
FC Ingolstadt (loan)	2018–19	2. Bundesliga	16	0	0	0	—		2	0	18	0	
RB Leipzig	2019–20	Bundesliga	0	0	0	0	0	0	—		0	0	
RB Leipzig	2020–21	Bundesliga	0	0	0	0	0	0	—		0	0	
RB Leipzig	2021–22	Bundesliga	1	0	0	0	0	0	—		1	0	
RB Leipzig	Total		1	0	0	0	0	0	—		1	0	—
Career total			277	1	12	0	0	0	2	0	291	1	—

== Honours ==
RB Leipzig

- DFB-Pokal: 2021–22
