= 2019–20 RB Leipzig season =

RB Leipzig
2019–20 season
- Chairman: Oliver Mintzlaff
- Head coach: Julian Nagelsmann
- Stadium: Red Bull Arena
- Bundesliga: 3rd
- DFB-Pokal: Round of 16
- UEFA Champions League: Semi-finals
- Top goalscorer: League: Timo Werner (28); All: Timo Werner (34)
- Highest home attendance: 42,146
- Lowest home attendance: 38,517
- Average home league attendance: 40,815
- Biggest win: 8–0 vs Mainz 05
- Biggest defeat: 0–3 vs Paris Saint-Germain
Home colours	Away colours	Third colours

The 2019–20 season was RB Leipzig's 11th season in existence and the club's fourth consecutive season in the top flight of German football. In addition to the domestic league, RB Leipzig participated in this season's edition of the DFB-Pokal, and also participated in the UEFA Champions League. The season was slated to cover a period from 1 July 2019 to 30 June 2020. It was extended extraordinarily beyond 30 June due to the COVID-19 pandemic in Germany.

== Players ==
=== Squad information ===
As of 31 January 2020

Note: Flags indicate national team as defined under FIFA eligibility rules; some limited exceptions apply. Players may hold more than one non-FIFA nationality.

No.	Pos.	Nation	Player
1	GK	HUN	Péter Gulácsi
3	DF	ESP	Angeliño (on loan from Manchester City)
4	DF	HUN	Willi Orbán (Captain)
5	DF	FRA	Dayot Upamecano
6	DF	FRA	Ibrahima Konaté
7	FW	AUT	Marcel Sabitzer
8	MF	MLI	Amadou Haidara
9	FW	DEN	Yussuf Poulsen
10	MF	SWE	Emil Forsberg
11	FW	GER	Timo Werner
14	MF	USA	Tyler Adams
16	DF	GER	Lukas Klostermann
17	FW	ENG	Ademola Lookman
18	MF	FRA	Christopher Nkunku

No.	Pos.	Nation	Player
19	MF	AUT	Hannes Wolf
21	FW	CZE	Patrik Schick (on loan from Roma)
22	DF	FRA	Nordi Mukiele
23	DF	GER	Marcel Halstenberg
25	MF	ESP	Dani Olmo
26	DF	WAL	Ethan Ampadu (on loan from Chelsea)
27	DF	AUT	Konrad Laimer
28	GK	SUI	Yvon Mvogo
32	GK	GER	Tim Schreiber
33	GK	GER	Philipp Tschauner
44	MF	SLO	Kevin Kampl
53	MF	GER	Tom Krauß
—	MF	GER	Elias Abouchabaka

=== Players out on loan ===
Note: Flags indicate national team as defined under FIFA eligibility rules; some limited exceptions apply. Players may hold more than one non-FIFA nationality.

No.	Pos.	Nation	Player
—	DF	URU	Marcelo Saracchi (at Galatasaray until 30 June 2021)
—	FW	FRA	Jean-Kévin Augustin (at Leeds United until 30 June 2020)

No.	Pos.	Nation	Player
—	DF	BRA	Luan Cândido (at Red Bull Bragantino until 30 June 2021)

== Transfers ==
=== Transfers in ===
#	Position	Player	Transferred from	Fee	Date	Source
36	DF	(Brazil) Luan Cândido	(Brazil) Palmeiras B	€8,000,000	28 May 2019	
19	MF	(Austria) Hannes Wolf	(Austria) Red Bull Salzburg	€12,000,000	1 July 2019	
18	MF	(France) Christopher Nkunku	(France) Paris Saint-Germain	€13,000,000	17 July 2019	
17	FW	(England) Ademola Lookman	(England) Everton	€18,000,000	25 July 2019	
33	GK	(Germany) Philipp Tschauner	(Germany) Hannover 96	€350,000	30 July 2019	
25	MF	(Spain) Dani Olmo	(Croatia) Dinamo Zagreb	€20,000,000	25 January 2020	

==== Loans in ====
#	Position	Player	Loaned from	Date	Loan expires	Source
26	DF	(Wales) Ethan Ampadu	(England) Chelsea	22 July 2019	30 June 2020	
21	FW	(Czech Republic) Patrik Schick	(Italy) Roma	2 September 2019	30 June 2020	
3	DF	(Spain) Angeliño	(England) Manchester City	31 January 2020	30 June 2020	

=== Transfers out ===
#	Position	Player	Transferred to	Fee	Date	Source
17	FW	(Portugal) Bruma	(Netherlands) PSV Eindhoven	€15,000,000	28 June 2019	
32	GK	(Germany) Julian Krahl	(Germany) 1. FC Köln	Free	1 July 2019	
21	GK	(Germany) Marius Müller	(Switzerland) Luzern	Undisclosed	5 July 2019	
31	MF	(Germany) Diego Demme	(Italy) Napoli	€12,000,000	11 January 2020	
20	FW	(Brazil) Matheus Cunha	(Germany) Hertha BSC	€15,000,000	31 January 2020	
13	MF	(Austria) Stefan Ilsanker	(Germany) Eintracht Frankfurt	€500,000	31 January 2020	

==== Loans out ====
#	Position	Player	Loaned to	Date	Loan expires	Source
	MF	(Germany) Elias Abouchabaka	(Germany) Greuther Fürth	14 July 2018	17 January 2020	
29	FW	(France) Jean-Kévin Augustin	(France) Monaco	1 September 2019	26 January 2020	
3	DF	(Uruguay) Marcelo Saracchi	(Turkey) Galatasaray	4 January 2020	30 June 2021	
36	DF	(Brazil) Luan Cândido	(Brazil) Red Bull Bragantino	15 January 2020	30 June 2021	
29	FW	(France) Jean-Kévin Augustin	(England) Leeds United	27 January 2020	30 June 2020	

== Kits ==
Home	Home alt.	Home 2020–21	Home 2020–21 alt.	Away	Third	Fourth

== Pre-season and friendlies ==
Win Draw Loss

12 July 2019 Friendly	RB Leipzig	1–4	Zürich	Leipzig, Germany
18:00 CEST (UTC+2)	Forsberg 82' (pen.)	Report	Kololli 13'; Ceesay 17'; Sohm 29'; Aliu 64'	Stadium: Trainingszentrum RB Leipzig Platz 1 Attendance: 1,547

19 July 2019 Friendly	RB Leipzig	3–2	Galatasaray	Innsbruck, Austria
18:00 CEST (UTC+2)	Halstenberg 57'; Poulsen 58'; Augustin 59'; Cândido (yellow card) 84'; Cunha (yellow card) 85'	Report	Babel 28', 89'; Çalık (yellow card) 34'; Donk (yellow card) 55'	Stadium: Tivoli-Neu; Referee: Felix Ouschan (Austria)

26 July 2019 Friendly	RB Leipzig	2–0	Rennes	Markranstädt, Germany
18:00 CEST (UTC+2)	Orbán 52'; Martel (yellow card) 90'; Ilsanker (yellow card) 96'; Poulsen 134'	Report	Grenier (yellow card) 79'; Morel (yellow card) 111'	Stadium: Stadion am Bad Großfeld; Attendance: 3,047

3 August 2019 Friendly	RB Leipzig	1–3	Aston Villa	Leipzig, Germany
15:30 CEST (UTC+2)	Poulsen 28'; Konate (yellow card) 79'; Werner (yellow card) 81'	Report	Hourihane 16', 82'; Guilbert (yellow card) 63'; El Ghazi (yellow card) 78'; Mings (yellow card) 81'; McGinn 89'	Stadium: Red Bull Arena; Attendance: 15,811; Referee: Steven Greif

30 July 2020 Friendly	RB Leipzig	1–1	VfL Wolfsburg	Leipzig, Germany
16:00 CEST (UTC+2)	Schick 73' (pen.)	Report	Steffen 71' (pen.)	Stadium: Trainingszentrum RB Leipzig Platz 3 Attendance: 0 Referee: Felix Zwayer

== Competitions ==
=== Overview ===
Competition	First match	Last match	Starting round	Final position	Record							
Competition	First match	Last match	Starting round	Final position	Pld	W	D	L	GF	GA	GD	Win %
Bundesliga	18 August 2019	27 June 2020	Matchday 1	3rd	34	18	12	4	81	37	+44	52.94
DFB-Pokal	11 August 2019	4 February 2020	First round	Round of 16	3	2	0	1	10	6	+4	66.67
Champions League	17 September 2019	18 August 2020	Group stage	Semi-finals	10	6	2	2	16	12	+4	60.00
Total					47	26	14	7	107	55	+52	55.32

Last updated: 18 August 2020
Source: Soccerway

=== Bundesliga ===
==== League table ====
Pos	Team	Pld	W	D	L	GF	GA	GD	Pts	Qualification or relegation
1	Bayern Munich (C)	34	26	4	4	100	32	+68	82	Qualification for the Champions League group stage
2	Borussia Dortmund	34	21	6	7	84	41	+43	69	Qualification for the Champions League group stage
3	RB Leipzig	34	18	12	4	81	37	+44	66	Qualification for the Champions League group stage
4	Borussia Mönchengladbach	34	20	5	9	66	40	+26	65	Qualification for the Champions League group stage
5	Bayer Leverkusen	34	19	6	9	61	44	+17	63	Qualification for the Europa League group stage (Note: Since the winners of the 2019–20 DFB-Pokal, Bayern Munich, qualified for the Champions League based on league position, the Europa League group stage spot was passed to the sixth-placed team, and the Europa League second qualifying round spot was passed to the seventh-placed team.)

Source: DFB
Rules for classification: 1) Points; 2) Goal difference; 3) Goals scored; 4) Head-to-head results; 5) Head-to-head away goals scored; 6) Away goals scored; 7) Play-off.
(C) Champions

==== Results summary ====
Overall								Home						Away					
Pld	W	D	L	GF	GA	GD	Pts	W	D	L	GF	GA	GD	W	D	L	GF	GA	GD
34	18	12	4	81	37	+44	66	7	8	2	38	21	+17	11	4	2	43	16	+27

Last updated: 27 June 2020.
Source: Bundesliga

==== Results by round ====
Round	1	2	3	4	5	6	7	8	9	10	11	12	13	14	15	16	17	18	19	20	21	22	23	24	25	26	27	28	29	30	31	32	33	34
Ground	A	H	A	H	A	H	A	H	A	H	A	H	A	H	A	A	H	H	A	H	A	H	A	H	A	H	A	H	A	H	A	H	H	A
Result	W	W	W	D	W	L	D	D	L	W	W	W	W	W	W	D	W	W	L	D	D	W	W	D	D	D	W	D	W	D	W	D	L	W
Position	2	2	1	1	1	2	4	5	6	3	2	2	2	2	1	1	1	1	1	2	2	2	2	2	3	4	3	3	3	3	3	3	3	3

Updated to match(es) played on 27 June 2020. Source: Bundesliga
A = Away; H = Home; W = Win; D = Draw; L = Loss

==== Matches ====
The Bundesliga schedule was announced on 28 June 2019.

18 August 2019 1	Union Berlin	0–4	RB Leipzig	Berlin
18:00 CEST (UTC+2)	Becker (yellow card) 82'	Report	Halstenberg 16'; Sabitzer 31'; Werner 42'; Nkunku 69'	Stadium: Stadion An der Alten Försterei; Attendance: 22,467; Referee: Markus Schmidt

25 August 2019 2	RB Leipzig	2–1	Eintracht Frankfurt	Leipzig
15:30 CEST (UTC+2)	Demme (yellow card) 7'; Werner 10'; Poulsen (yellow card) 59', (goal) 80'	Report	Paciência (yellow card) 41', (goal) 89'; Joveljić (yellow card) 67'; Kohr (yellow card) 90'	Stadium: Red Bull Arena; Attendance: 40,108; Referee: Benjamin Cortus

30 August 2019 3	Borussia Mönchengladbach	1–3	RB Leipzig	Mönchengladbach
20:30 CEST (UTC+2)	Embolo (yellow card) 2', (goal) 90'; Zakaria (yellow card) 42'; Wendt (yellow card) 81'	Report	Laimer (yellow card) 18'; Werner 38', 47', 90+4'; Konaté (yellow card) 68'	Stadium: Borussia-Park; Attendance: 45,000; Referee: Sven Jablonski

14 September 2019 4	RB Leipzig	1–1	Bayern Munich	Leipzig
18:30 CEST (UTC+2)	Halstenberg (yellow card) 26'; Forsberg 45+3' (pen.); Nkunku (yellow card) 78'; Laimer (yellow card) 80'; Sabitzer (yellow card) 90+2'	Report	Lewandowski 3', (yellow card) 26'; Boateng (yellow card) 57'	Stadium: Red Bull Arena; Attendance: 42,146; Referee: Sascha Stegemann

21 September 2019 5	Werder Bremen	0–3	RB Leipzig	Bremen
18:30 CEST (UTC+2)		Report	Orbán 13'; Konaté (yellow card) 29'; Sabitzer 35'; Laimer (yellow card) 43' (yellow-red card) 64'; Saracchi 83'	Stadium: Weser-Stadion; Attendance: 40,550; Referee: Tobias Stieler

28 September 2019 6	RB Leipzig	1–3	Schalke 04	Leipzig
15:30 CEST (UTC+2)	Halstenberg (yellow card) 45+5'; Forsberg 83'	Report	Sané 29'; Harit 43' (pen.); Matondo 58'; Caligiuri (yellow card) 86'	Stadium: Red Bull Arena; Attendance: 42,146; Referee: Manuel Gräfe

5 October 2019 7	Bayer Leverkusen	1–1	RB Leipzig	Leverkusen
15:30 CEST (UTC+2)	Sinkgraven (yellow card) 45'; Volland 66'; Weiser (yellow card) 74'	Report	Demme (yellow card) 60'; Poulsen (yellow card) 73'; Nkunku 78'	Stadium: BayArena; Attendance: 26,355; Referee: Marco Fritz

19 October 2019 8	RB Leipzig	1–1	VfL Wolfsburg	Leipzig
15:30 CEST (UTC+2)	Werner 54'; Saracchi (yellow card) 69'	Report	Guilavogui (yellow card) 7'; Mbabu (yellow card) 12'; Tisserand (yellow card) 45'; Weghorst 82'	Stadium: Red Bull Arena; Attendance: 39,182; Referee: Deniz Aytekin

26 October 2019 9	SC Freiburg	2–1	RB Leipzig	Freiburg
15:30 CEST (UTC+2)	Höfler 45+2', (yellow card) 62'; Haberer (yellow card) 66'; Petersen 90'; Grifo (yellow card) 90+2'	Report	Upamecano (yellow card) 51'; Klostermann 90+3'	Stadium: Schwarzwald-Stadion; Attendance: 24,000; Referee: Harm Osmers

2 November 2019 10	RB Leipzig	8–0	Mainz 05	Leipzig
15:30 CET (UTC+1)	Sabitzer 5'; Werner 30', 48', 87'; Nkunku 35'; Halstenberg 39'; Poulsen 44'; Mukiele 50'	Report	Pierre-Gabriel (yellow card) 84'	Stadium: Red Bull Arena; Attendance: 38,517; Referee: Guido Winkmann

9 November 2019 11	Hertha BSC	2–4	RB Leipzig	Berlin
15:30 CET (UTC+1)	Mittelstädt (yellow card) 23', (goal) 32'; Darida (yellow card) 90'; Selke 90+2'	Report	Ilsanker (yellow card) 17'; Werner 38' (pen.), 90+1'; Sabitzer 45+1'; Kampl 87'	Stadium: Olympiastadion; Attendance: 48,532; Referee: Sören Storks

23 November 2019 12	RB Leipzig	4–1	1. FC Köln	Leipzig
18:30 CET (UTC+1)	Werner 22'; Forsberg 32' (pen.), 79'; Laimer 37'	Report	Czichos 39'; Kainz (yellow card) 66'; Verstraete (yellow card) 86'; Terodde (yellow card) 89'	Stadium: Red Bull Arena; Attendance: 42,036; Referee: Robert Schröder

30 November 2019 13	SC Paderborn	2–3	RB Leipzig	Paderborn
15:30 CET (UTC+1)	Collins (yellow card) 33'; Mamba 62'; Gjasula 73', (yellow card) 90+3'; Antwi-Adjei (yellow card) 90+5'	Report	Schick 3', (yellow card) 74'; Sabitzer 4'; Werner 26', (yellow card) 90+3'; Ilsanker (yellow card) 44'	Stadium: Benteler-Arena; Attendance: 13,352; Referee: Bibiana Steinhaus

7 December 2019 14	RB Leipzig	3–1	1899 Hoffenheim	Leipzig
15:30 CET (UTC+1)	Werner 11', 52' (pen.); Halstenberg (yellow card) 54'; Laimer (yellow card) 77'; Sabitzer 83', (yellow card) 84'	Report	Posch (yellow card) 51'; Bičakčić 82'	Stadium: Red Bull Arena; Attendance: 38,607; Referee: Deniz Aytekin

14 December 2019 15	Fortuna Düsseldorf	0–3	RB Leipzig	Düsseldorf
18:30 CET (UTC+1)	Ayhan (yellow card) 57'; Bodzek (yellow card) 78'	Report	Schick 2'; Demme (yellow card) 33'; Werner 58' (pen.); Mukiele 75'	Stadium: Merkur Spiel-Arena; Attendance: 40,000; Referee: Robert Hartmann

17 December 2019 16	Borussia Dortmund	3–3	RB Leipzig	Dortmund
20:30 CET (UTC+1)	Weigl 23'; Brandt 34'; Sancho 55'	Report	Werner 47', 53'; Schick 77'	Stadium: Signal Iduna Park; Attendance: 80,200; Referee: Tobias Stieler

21 December 2019 17	RB Leipzig	3–1	FC Augsburg	Leipzig
15:30 CET (UTC+1)	Laimer 68'; Schick 80', (yellow card) 80'; Poulsen 90'	Report	Niederlechner 8'; Uduokhai (yellow card) 44'; Baier (yellow card) 68'; Vargas (yellow card) 72'	Stadium: Red Bull Arena; Attendance: 40,562; Referee: Daniel Siebert

18 January 2020 18	RB Leipzig	3–1	Union Berlin	Leipzig
18:30 CET (UTC+1)	Werner 51', 83'; Sabitzer 57'; Haidara (yellow card) 88'	Report	Bülter 10'; Andersson (yellow card) 60'; Ryerson (yellow card) 71'; Parensen (yellow card) 80'	Stadium: Red Bull Arena; Attendance: 42,146; Referee: Bastian Dankert

25 January 2020 19	Eintracht Frankfurt	2–0	RB Leipzig	Frankfurt
15:30 CET (UTC+1)	Rode (yellow card) 44'; Touré 48'; Kostić 90+4'	Report	Sabitzer (yellow card) 52'; Halstenberg (yellow card) 88'	Stadium: Commerzbank-Arena; Attendance: 50,300; Referee: Daniel Siebert

1 February 2020 20	RB Leipzig	2–2	Borussia Mönchengladbach	Leipzig
18:30 CET (UTC+1)	Schick 50'; Werner (yellow card) 74'; Nkunku 89'	Report	Neuhaus (yellow card) 18'; Pléa 24', (yellow card) 61' (yellow-red card) 61'; Hofmann 35'; Elvedi (yellow card) 61'; Embolo (yellow card) 70'	Stadium: Red Bull Arena; Attendance: 42,146; Referee: Tobias Stieler

9 February 2020 21	Bayern Munich	0–0	RB Leipzig	Munich
18:00 CET (UTC+1)	Kimmich (yellow card) 57'; Pavard (yellow card) 90+3'	Report	Laimer (yellow card) 36'; Upamecano (yellow card) 50'	Stadium: Allianz Arena; Attendance: 75,000; Referee: Marco Fritz

15 February 2020 22	RB Leipzig	3–0	Werder Bremen	Leipzig
15:30 CET (UTC+1)	Klostermann 18'; Schick 39'; Mukiele 46'; Upamecano (yellow card) 83'	Report	Eggestein (yellow card) 16'	Stadium: Red Bull Arena; Attendance: 41,308; Referee: Benjamin Cortus

22 February 2020 23	Schalke 04	0–5	RB Leipzig	Gelsenkirchen
18:30 CET (UTC+1)	Raman (yellow card) 3'; Harit (yellow card) 43'	Report	Sabitzer 1'; Laimer (yellow card) 5'; Werner (yellow card) 57', (goal) 61'; Halstenberg 68'; Upamecano (yellow card) 78'; Angeliño 80'; Forsberg 89'	Stadium: Veltins-Arena; Attendance: 61,433; Referee: Sascha Stegemann

1 March 2020 24	RB Leipzig	1–1	Bayer Leverkusen	Leipzig
15:30 CET (UTC+1)	Schick 32'	Report	Demirbay (yellow card) 24'; Bailey 29'; Tah (yellow card) 39'; Diaby (yellow card) 90+3'	Stadium: Red Bull Arena; Attendance: 41,216; Referee: Felix Zwayer

7 March 2020 25	VfL Wolfsburg	0–0	RB Leipzig	Wolfsburg
15:30 CET (UTC+1)	Otávio (yellow card) 64'; Weghorst (yellow card) 78'	Report	Laimer (yellow card) 41'; Upamecano (yellow card) 57'; Olmo (yellow card) 90'	Stadium: Volkswagen Arena; Attendance: 27,195; Referee: Daniel Schlager

16 May 2020 26	RB Leipzig	1–1	SC Freiburg	Leipzig
15:30 CEST (UTC+2)	Poulsen 77'	Report	Sallai (yellow card) 24'; Gulde 34'	Stadium: Red Bull Arena; Attendance: 0 Referee: Manuel Gräfe
Note: The match was postponed on 13 March due to the pandemic of COVID-19 in Germany. and rescheduled to 16 May.

24 May 2020 27	Mainz 05	0–5	RB Leipzig	Mainz
15:30 CEST (UTC+2)	Kunde (yellow card) 20'; Bruma (yellow card) 31'; St. Juste (yellow card) 79'	Report	Werner 11', 48', 75', (yellow card) 35'; Sabitzer (yellow card) 13', (goal) 36'; Upamecano (yellow card) 17'; Poulsen 23'	Stadium: Opel Arena; Attendance: 0 Referee: Markus Schmidt
Note: The match was postponed on 13 March due to the pandemic of COVID-19 in Germany, and rescheduled to 24 May.

27 May 2020 28	RB Leipzig	2–2	Hertha BSC	Leipzig
18:30 CEST (UTC+2)	Klostermann 24'; Halstenberg (yellow card) 45+4' (yellow-red card) 63'; Schick 68'	Report	Grujić 9'; Pekarík (yellow card) 42'; Torunarigha (yellow card) 57'; Piątek 82' (pen.); Cunha (yellow card) 90+4'	Stadium: Red Bull Arena; Attendance: 0 Referee: Bastian Dankert
Note: The match was postponed on 24 March due to the pandemic of COVID-19 in Germany, and rescheduled to 27 May.

1 June 2020 29	1. FC Köln	2–4	RB Leipzig	Cologne
20:30 CEST (UTC+2)	Córdoba 7'; Leistner (yellow card) 30'; Modeste 55'; Drexler (yellow card) 62'	Report	Schick 20'; Nkunku 38'; Werner 50'; Olmo 57'; Forsberg (yellow card) 89'	Stadium: RheinEnergieStadion; Attendance: 0 Referee: Christian Dingert
Note: The match was postponed on 24 March due to the pandemic of COVID-19 in Germany, and rescheduled to 1 June.

6 June 2020 30	RB Leipzig	1–1	SC Paderborn	Leipzig
15:30 CEST (UTC+2)	Upamecano (yellow card) 16' (yellow-red card) 43'; Schick 27'	Report	Gjasula (yellow card) 22'; Hünemeier (yellow card) 28'; Mamba (yellow card) 43'; Strohdiek (yellow card) 63', (goal) 90+2'	Stadium: Red Bull Arena; Attendance: 0 Referee: Deniz Aytekin
Note: The match was postponed on 24 March due to the pandemic of COVID-19 in Germany, and rescheduled to 6 June.

12 June 2020 31	1899 Hoffenheim	0–2	RB Leipzig	Hoffenheim
20:30 CEST (UTC+2)	Samassékou (yellow card) 3'; Zuber (yellow card) 33'	Report	Olmo 9', 11'; Klostermann (yellow card) 26'; Nkunku (yellow card) 75'	Stadium: Rhein-Neckar-Arena; Attendance: 0 Referee: Tobias Welz
Note: The match was postponed on 24 March due to the pandemic of COVID-19 in Germany, and rescheduled to 12 June.

17 June 2020 32	RB Leipzig	2–2	Fortuna Düsseldorf	Leipzig
20:30 CEST (UTC+2)	Kampl 60'; Werner 63'; Angeliño (yellow card) 90+4'	Report	Skrzybski 87'; Hoffmann 90+2'	Stadium: Red Bull Arena; Attendance: 0 Referee: Manuel Gräfe
Note: The match was postponed on 24 March due to the pandemic of COVID-19 in Germany, and rescheduled to 17 June.

20 June 2020 33	RB Leipzig	0–2	Borussia Dortmund	Leipzig
15:30 CEST (UTC+2)	Schick (yellow card) 21'; Kampl (yellow card) 53'; Angeliño (yellow card) 57'	Report	Haaland 30', 90+3'; Reyna (yellow card) 50'; Can (yellow card) 74'; Witsel (yellow card) 80'	Stadium: Red Bull Arena; Attendance: 0 Referee: Felix Zwayer
Note: The match was postponed on 24 March due to the pandemic of COVID-19 in Germany, and rescheduled to 20 June.

27 June 2020 34	FC Augsburg	1–2	RB Leipzig	Augsburg
15:30 CEST (UTC+2)	Gruezo (yellow card) 45+2'; Hahn (yellow card) 52'; Jedvaj (yellow card) 67'; Max (yellow card) 68'; Vargas 72'	Report	Werner 28', 82'; Mukiele (yellow card) 71'	Stadium: WWK Arena; Attendance: 0 Referee: Felix Brych
Note: The match was postponed on 7 May due to the pandemic of COVID-19 in Germany, and rescheduled to 27 June.

=== DFB-Pokal ===
11 August 2019 First round	Osnabrück	2–3	RB Leipzig	Osnabrück
15:30 CEST (UTC+2)	Amenyido 9'; Álvarez 73' (pen.); Taffertshofer (yellow card) 79'	Report	Sabitzer 7', 31'; Klostermann 29'; Konaté (yellow card) 86'	Stadium: Stadion an der Bremer Brücke; Attendance: 14,625; Referee: Tobias Stieler

30 October 2019 Second round	VfL Wolfsburg	1–6	RB Leipzig	Wolfsburg
18:30 CET (UTC+1)	Mbabu (yellow card) 7'; Arnold (yellow card) 42'; Weghorst (yellow card) 59', (goal) 89'	Report	Pervan 13' (o.g.); Mukiele (yellow card) 35'; Sabitzer 55'; Forsberg 58'; Laimer 61'; Werner 68', 88'; Ampadu (yellow card) 84'	Stadium: Volkswagen Arena; Attendance: 17,705; Referee: Felix Zwayer

4 February 2020 Round of 16	Eintracht Frankfurt	3–1	RB Leipzig	Frankfurt
18:30 CET (UTC+1)	Silva 17' (pen.); Gaćinović (yellow card) 20'; Rode (yellow card) 42'; Kostić 51', 90+5'	Report	Haidara (yellow card) 2'; Halstenberg (yellow card) 16'; Olmo 69'	Stadium: Commerzbank-Arena; Attendance: 47,000; Referee: Felix Brych

=== UEFA Champions League ===
==== Group stage ====
Pos	Team	Pld	W	D	L	GF	GA	GD	Pts	Qualification	RBL	LYO	BEN	ZEN
1	(Germany) RB Leipzig	6	3	2	1	10	8	+2	11	Advance to knockout phase	—	0–2	2–2	2–1
2	(France) Lyon	6	2	2	2	9	8	+1	8	Advance to knockout phase	2–2	—	3–1	1–1
3	(Portugal) Benfica	6	2	1	3	10	11	−1	7 (Note: Tied on head-to-head points (3). Head-to-head goal difference: Benfica +1, Zenit Saint Petersburg −1.)	Transfer to Europa League	1–2	2–1	—	3–0
4	(Russia) Zenit Saint Petersburg	6	2	1	3	7	9	−2	7		0–2	2–0	3–1	—

Source: UEFA
Rules for classification: Group stage tiebreakers
Notes:

17 September 2019 1	Benfica (Portugal)	1–2	(Germany) RB Leipzig	Lisbon, Portugal
21:00 CEST (UTC+2)	Jota (yellow card) 62'; Seferovic 84'	Report	Poulsen (yellow card) 57'; Werner 69', 78'; Haidara (yellow card) 70'	Stadium: Estádio da Luz; Attendance: 46,460; Referee: Anastasios Sidiropoulos (Greece)

2 October 2019 2	RB Leipzig (Germany)	0–2	(France) Lyon	Leipzig, Germany
21:00 CEST (UTC+2)	Haidara (yellow card) 43'; Upamecano (yellow card) 54'; Orbán (yellow card) 55'	Report	Depay 11'; Terrier 65'	Stadium: Red Bull Arena; Attendance: 40,194; Referee: Antonio Mateu Lahoz (Spain)

23 October 2019 3	RB Leipzig (Germany)	2–1	(Russia) Zenit Saint Petersburg	Leipzig, Germany
18:55 CEST (UTC+2)	Laimer 49'; Sabitzer 59'	Report	Barrios (yellow card) 8'; Rakitskiy 25'	Stadium: Red Bull Arena; Attendance: 41,058; Referee: Ali Palabıyık (Turkey)

5 November 2019 4	Zenit Saint Petersburg (Russia)	0–2	(Germany) RB Leipzig	Saint Petersburg, Russia
18:55 CET (UTC+1)	Yerokhin (yellow card) 6'; Dzyuba (yellow card) 67'; Kuzyayev (yellow card) 88'	Report	Demme 45+5'; Sabitzer 63'; Upamecano (yellow card) 67'	Stadium: Krestovsky Stadium; Attendance: 50,452; Referee: Orel Grinfeld (Israel)

27 November 2019 5	RB Leipzig (Germany)	2–2	(Portugal) Benfica	Leipzig, Germany
21:00 CET (UTC+1)	Forsberg 90' (pen.), 90+6'	Report	Pizzi 20'; Taarabt (yellow card) 52'; Carlos Vinícius 59'; Dias (yellow card) 89'	Stadium: Red Bull Arena; Attendance: 38,339; Referee: Jesús Gil Manzano (Spain)

10 December 2019 6	Lyon (France)	2–2	(Germany) RB Leipzig	Décines-Charpieu, France
21:00 CET (UTC+1)	T. Mendes (yellow card) 33'; Aouar 50'; Depay 82'	Report	Upamecano (yellow card) 3'; Forsberg 9' (pen.); Werner 33' (pen.); Mukiele (yellow card) 52'; Saracchi (yellow card) 63'	Stadium: Parc Olympique Lyonnais; Attendance: 55,288; Referee: Anthony Taylor (England)

==== Knockout phase ====
19 February 2020 Round of 16; First leg	Tottenham Hotspur (England)	0–1	(Germany) RB Leipzig	London, England
21:00 CET (UTC+1)	Lo Celso (yellow card) 10'; Davies (yellow card) 56'; Lamela (yellow card) 90+4'	Report	Sabitzer (yellow card) 12'; Werner (yellow card) 33', (goal) 58' (pen.); Nkunku (yellow card) 72'	Stadium: Tottenham Hotspur Stadium; Attendance: 60,095; Referee: Cüneyt Çakır (Turkey)

10 March 2020 Round of 16; Second leg	RB Leipzig (Germany)	3–0 (4–0 agg.)	(England) Tottenham Hotspur	Leipzig, Germany
21:00 CET (UTC+1)	Sabitzer 10', 21', (yellow card) 71'; Laimer (yellow card) 50'; Forsberg 87'	Report	Sessegnon (yellow card) 34'; Winks (yellow card) 45+1'; Tanganga (yellow card) 69'; Alli (yellow card) 70'	Stadium: Red Bull Arena; Attendance: 42,146; Referee: Carlos del Cerro Grande (Spain)

13 August 2020 Quarter-finals	RB Leipzig (Germany)	2–1	(Spain) Atlético Madrid	Lisbon, Portugal
21:00 CEST (UTC+2)	Olmo 51'; Klostermann (yellow card) 70'; Kampl (yellow card) 82'; Haidara (yellow card) 87'; Adams 88'	Report	Lodi (yellow card) 62'; Félix 71' (pen.); Giménez (yellow card) 90+6'	Stadium: Estádio José Alvalade; Attendance: 0 Referee: Szymon Marciniak (Poland)

18 August 2020 Semi-finals	RB Leipzig (Germany)	0–3	(France) Paris Saint-Germain	Lisbon, Portugal
21:00 CEST (UTC+2)	Laimer (yellow card) 61'; Halstenberg (yellow card) 79'; Poulsen (yellow card) 79'	Report	Marquinhos 13'; Di María 42'; Kimpembe (yellow card) 45+3'; Bernat 56'	Stadium: Estádio da Luz; Attendance: 0 Referee: Björn Kuipers (Netherlands)

== Statistics ==
=== Appearances and goals ===
No.	Pos	Nat	Player	Total		Bundesliga		DFB-Pokal		Champions League	
No.	Pos	Nat	Player	Apps	Goals	Apps	Goals	Apps	Goals	Apps	Goals
Goalkeepers
1	GK	(Hungary) HUN	Péter Gulácsi	42	0	32	0	0	0	10	0
28	GK	(Switzerland) SUI	Yvon Mvogo	6	0	2	0	3	0	0+1	0
32	GK	(Germany) GER	Julian Krahl	0	0	0	0	0	0	0	0
33	GK	(Germany) GER	Philipp Tschauner	0	0	0	0	0	0	0	0
Defenders
3	DF	(Spain) ESP	Angeliño	18	1	12+1	1	1	0	4	0
4	DF	(Hungary) HUN	Willi Orbán	18	1	9+3	1	2	0	3+1	0
5	DF	(France) FRA	Dayot Upamecano	38	0	27+1	0	2	0	8	0
6	DF	(France) FRA	Ibrahima Konaté	11	0	6+2	0	1	0	2	0
16	DF	(Germany) GER	Lukas Klostermann	43	4	31	3	2	1	9+1	0
22	DF	(France) FRA	Nordi Mukiele	37	3	21+4	3	2	0	7+3	0
23	DF	(Germany) GER	Marcel Halstenberg	38	3	28+1	3	2	0	6+1	0
26	DF	(Wales) WAL	Ethan Ampadu	7	0	0+3	0	0+1	0	2+1	0
27	DF	(Austria) AUT	Konrad Laimer	42	4	26+3	2	3	1	9+1	1
Midfielders
8	MF	(Mali) MLI	Amadou Haidara	28	0	5+14	0	1+1	0	2+5	0
10	MF	(Sweden) SWE	Emil Forsberg	32	10	14+8	5	1	1	5+4	4
14	MF	(United States) USA	Tyler Adams	17	1	10+4	0	0	0	0+3	1
18	MF	(France) FRA	Christopher Nkunku	44	5	21+11	5	2+1	0	7+2	0
19	MF	(Germany) GER	Hannes Wolf	5	0	0+5	0	0	0	0	0
25	MF	(Spain) ESP	Dani Olmo	15	5	9+3	3	0+1	1	2	1
44	MF	(Slovenia) SLO	Kevin Kampl	15	2	8+3	2	0	0	3+1	0
53	MF	(Germany) GER	Tom Krauß	1	0	0+1	0	0	0	0	0
Forwards
7	FW	(Austria) AUT	Marcel Sabitzer	44	16	30+2	9	3	3	9	4
9	FW	(Denmark) DEN	Yussuf Poulsen	33	5	12+10	5	3	0	6+2	0
11	FW	(Germany) GER	Timo Werner	45	34	33+1	28	2+1	2	7+1	4
17	FW	(England) ENG	Ademola Lookman	13	0	1+10	0	0+1	0	1	0
21	FW	(Czech Republic) CZE	Patrik Schick	28	10	15+7	10	1	0	2+3	0
41	FW	(Germany) GER	Dennis Borkowski	1	0	0+1	0	0	0	0	0
Players transferred out during the season
3	MF	(Uruguay) URU	Marcelo Saracchi	7	1	1+3	1	0+1	0	2	0
13	MF	(Austria) AUT	Stefan Ilsanker	7	0	5+1	0	0+1	0	0	0
20	FW	(Brazil) BRA	Matheus Cunha	13	0	2+8	0	0+1	0	0+2	0
31	MF	(Germany) GER	Diego Demme	24	1	14+3	0	2	0	4+1	1
36	DF	(Brazil) BRA	Luan Cândido	0	0	0	0	0	0	0	0

Last updated: 18 August 2020
Source: Competitions

=== Goalscorers ===
As of matches played until 13 August 2020

Rank	No.	Pos.	Player	Bundesliga	DFB-Pokal	Champions League	Total
1	11	FW	(Germany) Timo Werner	28	2	4	34
2	7	FW	(Austria) Marcel Sabitzer	9	3	4	16
3	10	MF	(Sweden) Emil Forsberg	5	1	4	10
3	21	FW	(Czech Republic) Patrik Schick	10	0	0	10
5	18	MF	(France) Christopher Nkunku	5	0	0	5
5	9	FW	(Denmark) Yussuf Poulsen	5	0	0	5
5	25	MF	(Spain) Dani Olmo	3	1	1	5
8	16	DF	(Germany) Lukas Klostermann	3	1	0	4
8	27	DF	(Austria) Konrad Laimer	2	1	1	4
10	23	DF	(Germany) Marcel Halstenberg	3	0	0	3
10	22	DF	(France) Nordi Mukiele	3	0	0	3
12	44	MF	(Slovenia) Kevin Kampl	2	0	0	2
13	3	DF	(Spain) Angeliño	1	0	0	1
13	31	MF	(Germany) Diego Demme	0	0	1	1
13	4	DF	(Hungary) Willi Orbán	1	0	0	1
13	3	MF	(Uruguay) Marcelo Saracchi	1	0	0	1
13	14	MF	(United States) Tyler Adams	0	0	1	1
Own goals				0	1	0	1
TOTAL				83	10	16	107

=== Clean sheets ===
As of 27 June 2020

Rank	Name	Bundesliga	DFB-Pokal	Champions League	Total
1	(Hungary) Péter Gulácsi	10	0	3	13
2	(Switzerland) Yvon Mvogo	0	0	0	0
Total		10	0	3	13
