= Mahir Sağlık =

Turkish footballer

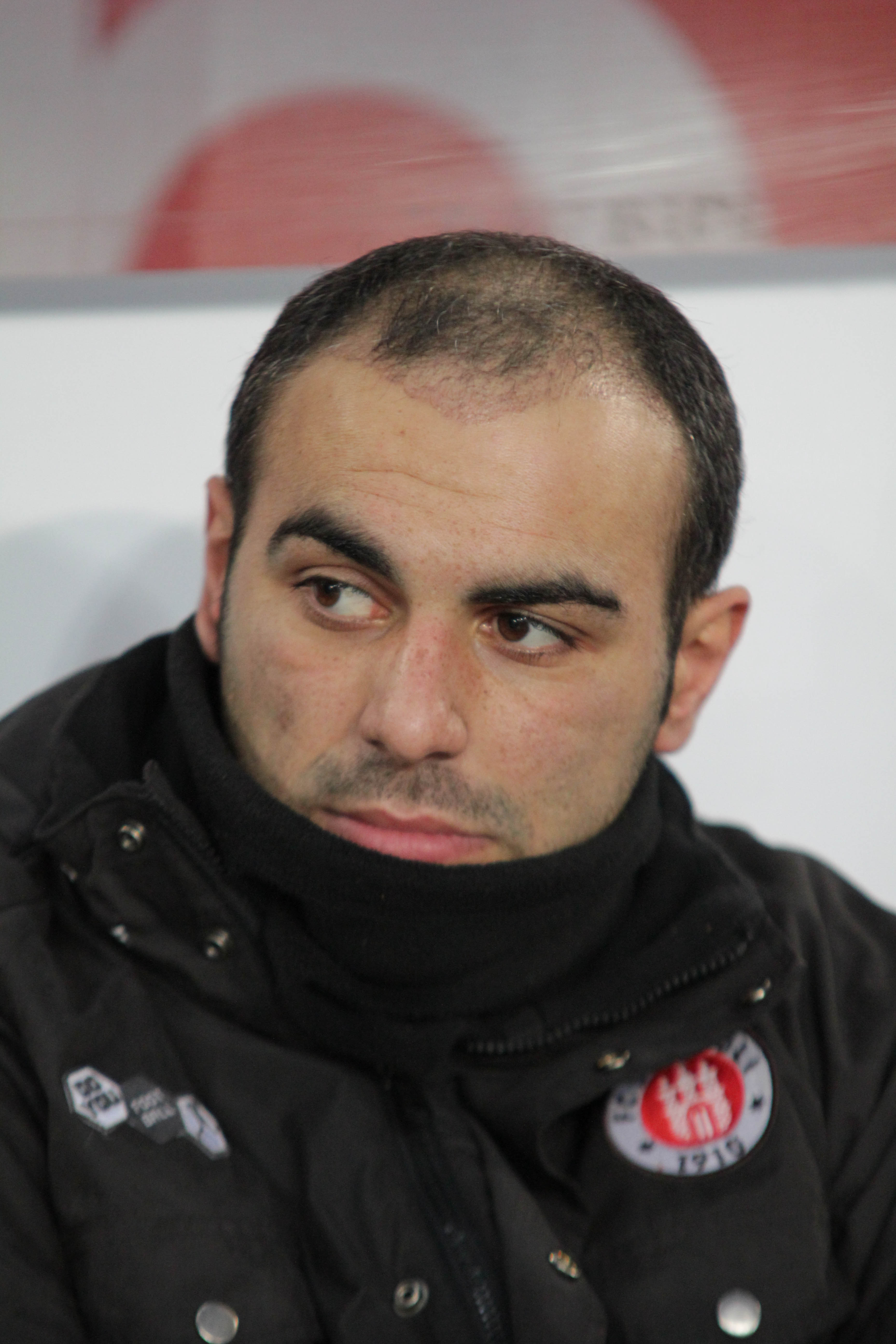
- Sağlık with St. Pauli in 2012

Personal information
- Date of birth: 18 January 1983 (age 43)
- Place of birth: Paderborn, West Germany
- Height: 1.78 m (5 ft 10 in)
- Position: Striker

Youth career
- –1997: Grün-Weiß Paderborn
- 1997–2001: SC Paderborn

Senior career*
| Years | Team | Apps | (Gls) |
| 2001–2004 | SC Paderborn | 51 | (21) |
| 2003–2004 | → LR Ahlen (loan) | 2 | (0) |
| 2004–2005 | Borussia Dortmund II | 30 | (12) |
| 2004–2005 | Borussia Dortmund | 0 | (0) |
| 2005–2006 | Admira Wacker | 23 | (3) |
| 2006–2007 | 1. FC Saarbrücken | 28 | (15) |
| 2007–2008 | Wuppertaler SV | 34 | (27) |
| 2008–2010 | VfL Wolfsburg | 8 | (1) |
| 2009 | → Karlsruher SC (loan) | 7 | (0) |
| 2009–2010 | → SC Paderborn (loan) | 27 | (15) |
| 2010–2011 | VfL Bochum | 26 | (3) |
| 2011–2013 | FC St. Pauli | 32 | (6) |
| 2013–2016 | SC Paderborn | 71 | (20) |
| 2016–2017 | Vasas SC | 25 | (6) |
| 2017–2018 | Sakaryaspor | 33 | (15) |
| 2018–2019 | Eyüpspor | 3 | (0) |
| 2019–2021 | Hessen Kassel | 69 | (48) |
| 2021–2022 | SC Verl | 12 | (0) |

International career^{‡}
| 2000 | Turkey U17 | 4 | (1) |
| 2001 | Turkey U18 | 4 | (1) |
| 2001 | Turkey U19 | 5 | (3) |
| 2003 | Turkey U20 | 5 | (1) |
- * Club domestic league appearances and goals as of 14 May 2022 ‡ National team caps and goals as of 23:20, 17 April 2015 (UTC)

Mahir Sağlık (born 18 January 1983) is a former professional footballer who played as a striker. Born in Germany, he was a former youth international for Turkey.

== Career ==
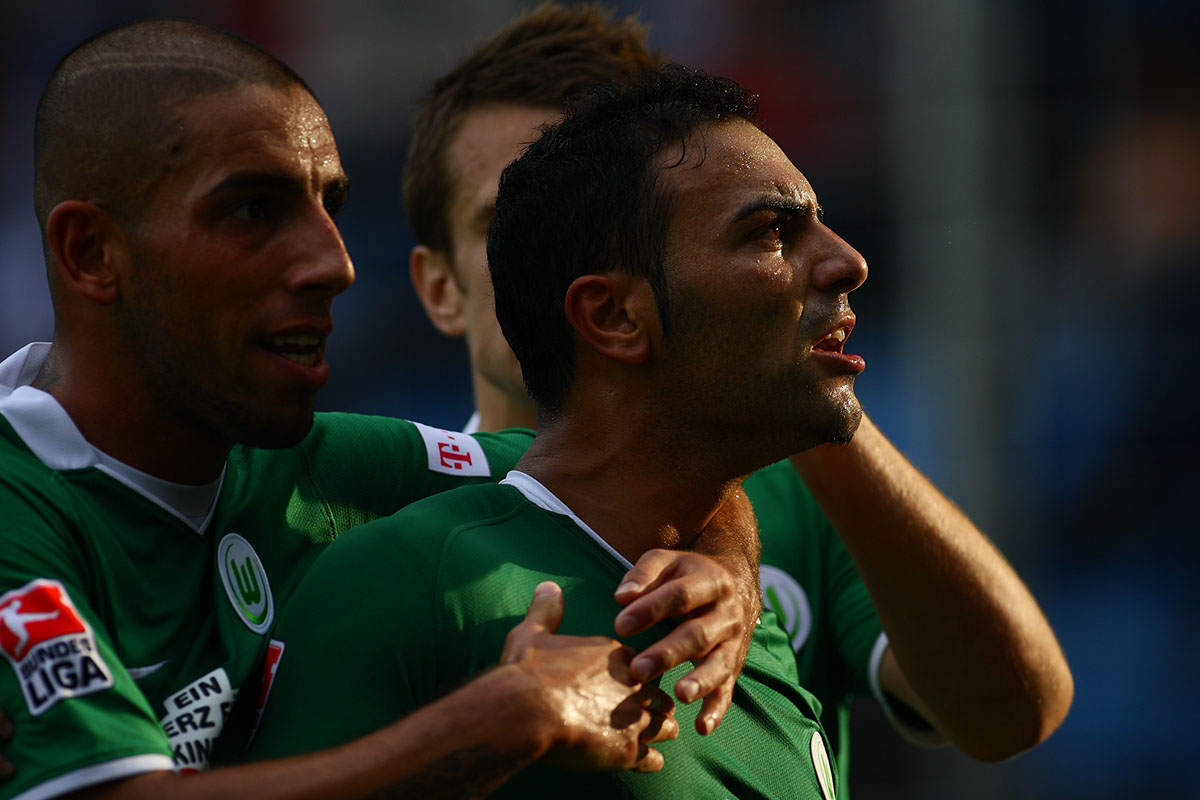
Mahir Sağlık with Ashkan Dejagah and Zvjezdan Misimović celebrating after scoring a goal in the match against VfL Bochum, 24 August 2008.

Sağlık signed a three-year deal for VfL Wolfsburg in September 2008. On 1 February 2009, he was loaned out to Karlsruher SC until the end of the season. On 31 August 2009, he was loaned out again to SC Paderborn. In January 2013, he returned to SC Paderborn 07 on a permanent deal. He scored his first goal on his return in a 2–2 away draw against former club FC St. Pauli and his first goal at the Benteler Arena in a 2–0 win against 1860 Munich on the final home game of the season.

Sağlık signed with 3. Liga club SC Verl in July 2021, following a trial.

== Career statistics ==
As of 5 July 2021

Appearances and goals by club, season and competition
| Club | Season | League | | | Cup | | Europe | | Total | |
| Club | Season | Division | Apps | Goals | Apps | Goals | Apps | Goals | Apps | Goals |
|---|---|---|---|---|---|---|---|---|---|---|
| SC Paderborn | 2001–02 | Regionalliga Nord | 10 | 4 | 0 | 0 | – | | 10 | 4 |
| SC Paderborn | 2002–03 | Regionalliga Nord | 26 | 10 | 1 | 0 | – | | 27 | 10 |
| SC Paderborn | 2003–04 | Regionalliga Nord | 15 | 7 | – | | – | | 15 | 7 |
| SC Paderborn | Total | | 51 | 21 | 1 | 0 | – | | 52 | 21 |
| LR Ahlen (loan) | 2003–04 | 2. Bundesliga | 2 | 0 | 0 | 0 | – | | 2 | 0 |
| Borussia Dortmund | 2004–05 | Bundesliga | 0 | 0 | 0 | 0 | 2 | 0 | 2 | 0 |
| Borussia Dortmund II | 2004–05 | Regionalliga Nord | 30 | 12 | – | | – | | 30 | 12 |
| Admira Wacker Mödling | 2005–06 | Austrian Bundesliga | 23 | 3 | 0 | 0 | – | | 23 | 3 |
| 1. FC Saarbrücken | 2006–07 | Regionalliga Süd | 28 | 15 | 1 | 0 | – | | 29 | 15 |
| Wuppertaler SV | 2007–08 | Regionalliga Nord | 34 | 27 | 3 | 2 | – | | 37 | 29 |
| VfL Wolfsburg | 2008–09 | Bundesliga | 8 | 1 | 2 | 2 | 4 | 1 | 14 | 4 |
| VfL Wolfsburg II | 2008–09 | Regionalliga Nord | 1 | 0 | – | | – | | 1 | 0 |
| Karlsruher SC (loan) | 2008–09 | Bundesliga | 7 | 0 | 0 | 0 | – | | 7 | 0 |
| Karlsruher SC II (loan) | 2008–09 | Regionalliga Süd | 1 | 0 | – | | – | | 1 | 0 |
| SC Paderborn (loan) | 2009–10 | 2. Bundesliga | 27 | 15 | 0 | 0 | – | | 27 | 15 |
| VfL Bochum | 2010–11 | 2. Bundesliga | 26 | 3 | 1 | 0 | – | | 27 | 3 |
| FC St. Pauli | 2011–12 | 2. Bundesliga | 23 | 5 | 1 | 1 | – | | 24 | 6 |
| FC St. Pauli | 2012–13 | 2. Bundesliga | 12 | 1 | 1 | 2 | – | | 13 | 3 |
| FC St. Pauli | Total | | 35 | 6 | 2 | 3 | 0 | 0 | 37 | 9 |
| SC Paderborn | 2012–13 | 2. Bundesliga | 12 | 2 | 0 | 0 | – | | 12 | 2 |
| SC Paderborn | 2013–14 | 2. Bundesliga | 29 | 15 | 1 | 1 | – | | 30 | 16 |
| SC Paderborn | 2014–15 | Bundesliga | 11 | 1 | 1 | 0 | – | | 12 | 1 |
| SC Paderborn | 2015–16 | 2. Bundesliga | 11 | 1 | 1 | 1 | – | | 12 | 2 |
| SC Paderborn | Total | | 22 | 2 | 2 | 1 | 0 | 0 | 24 | 3 |
| Vasas SC | 2016–17 | NB I | 25 | 6 | 10 | 7 | 1 | 0 | 36 | 13 |
| Sakaryaspor | 2017–18 | TFF Second League | 33 | 15 | 1 | 0 | – | | 34 | 15 |
| Eyüpspor | 2018–19 | TFF Second League | 3 | 0 | 1 | 0 | – | | 4 | 0 |
| KSV Hessen Kassel | 2018–19 | Hessenliga | 10 | 9 | 0 | 0 | – | | 10 | 9 |
| KSV Hessen Kassel | 2019–20 | Hessenliga | 20 | 19 | 1 | 2 | – | | 21 | 21 |
| KSV Hessen Kassel | 2020–21 | Regionalliga Südwest | 37 | 17 | 1 | 1 | – | | 38 | 18 |
| KSV Hessen Kassel | Total | | 67 | 45 | 2 | 3 | 0 | 0 | 69 | 48 |
| Career total | | | 498 | 193 | 29 | 19 | 7 | 1 | 534 | 213 |
