= Fabian Boll =

German footballer (born 1979)

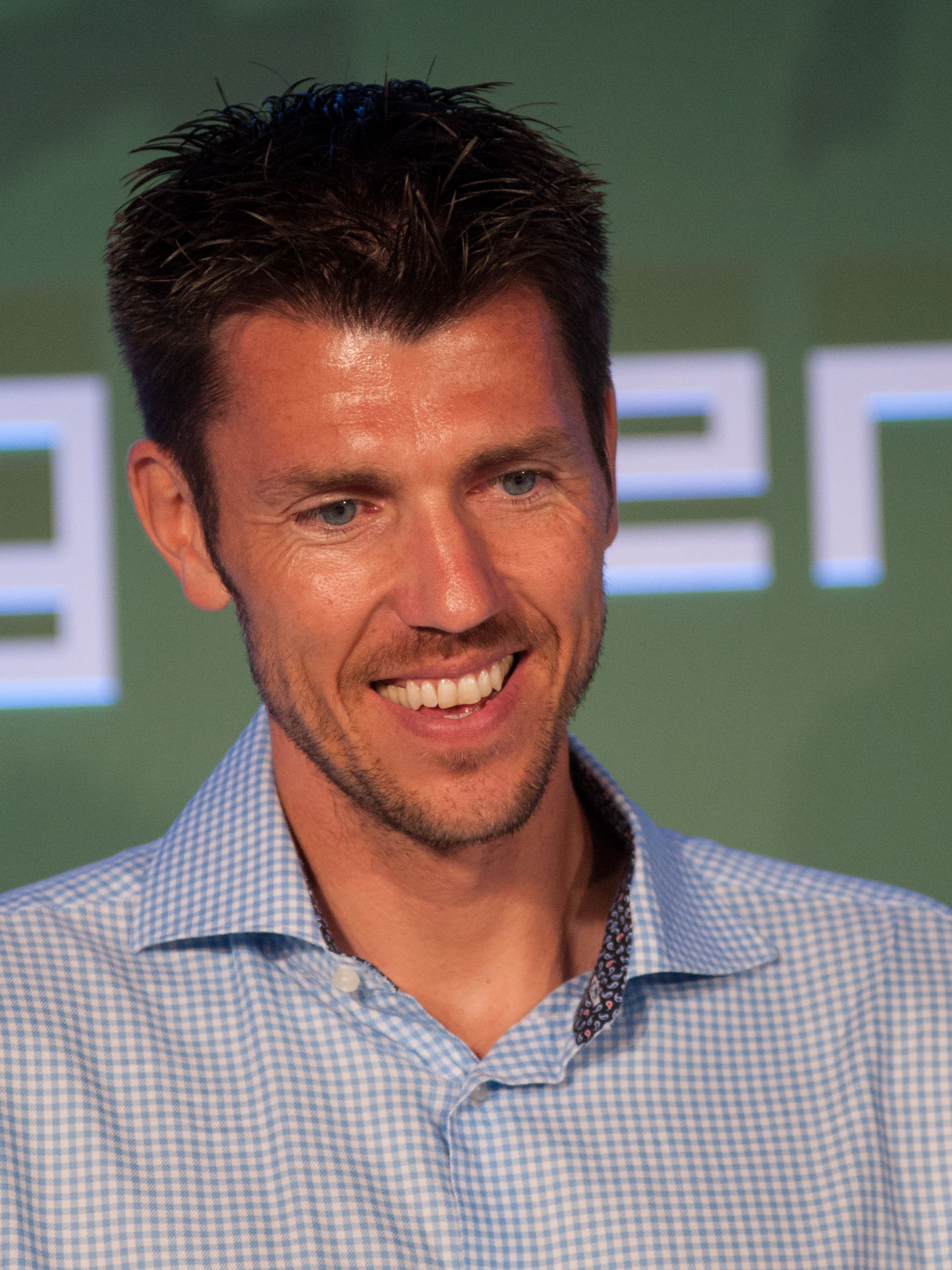
- Boll in 2014

Personal information
- Date of birth: 16 June 1979 (age 47)
- Place of birth: Bad Bramstedt, West Germany
- Height: 1.93 m (6 ft 4 in)
- Position: Midfielder

Youth career
- –1995: Bramstedter TS
- 1995–1996: Itzehoer SV
- 1996–1997: Hamburger SV
- 1997–2000: Itzehoer SV
- 2000–2001: TSV Lägerdorf

Senior career*
Years	Team	Apps	(Gls)
2001–2002	1. SC Norderstedt		
2002–2014	FC St. Pauli	273	(30)
2014–2016	FC St. Pauli II	0	(0)

Managerial career
- 2014–2016: FC St. Pauli II (player-assistant)
- 2014: FC St. Pauli II (caretaker)
- 2018: SC Condor Hamburg (assistant)
- 2019: SC Victoria Hamburg
- 2019–2021: Holstein Kiel (assistant)
- * Club domestic league appearances and goals

Fabian Boll (born 16 June 1979) is a German football manager and former player who manages SC Victoria Hamburg. During his playing career as a midfielder, he spent almost his entire senior career with FC St. Pauli.

== Playing career ==
As a police officer he was the only one on his St. Pauli team who had a non-football job. He inherited his number 17 from Ivan Klasnić who left St. Pauli for Werder Bremen.

== Coaching career ==
In June 2014, Boll started his coaching career, starting as a playing assistant manager for the reserve team of FC St. Pauli. Boll became caretaker manager from the beginning of September 2014 to the end of the month.

In the summer 2018, Boll was hired as an assistant manager for SC Condor Hamburg. Together with manager, Olufemi Smith, Boll was fired on 11 December 2018.

On 4 January 2019, Boll was appointed as the new manager of SC Victoria Hamburg with his former teammate from FC St. Pauli, Marius Ebbers, as his assistant.

For the start of the 2019–20 season Boll was appointed assistant manager of Holstein Kiel.
