= SC Victoria Hamburg =

German football club

- Full name: Sport-Club Victoria Hamburg von 1895 e. V.
- Founded: 1895; 131 years ago
- Ground: Stadion Hoheluft
- Capacity: 8,000
- Chairman: Ronald Lotz
- Manager: Marius Ebbers
- League: Oberliga Hamburg (V)
- 2025–26: Oberliga Hamburg, 4th of 18
| Home colours | Away colours | Third colours |

SC Victoria Hamburg is a German association football club from the city of Hamburg. The football team is part of a larger sports club that has departments for badminton, handball, hockey, athletics, tennis, table tennis (playing as SG Victoria Eppendorf), gymnastics, baseball (the Wildcats), and softball (the Oysters).

== History ==
Older logo

The club was founded 5 May 1895 as FC Victoria Hamburg out of the youth clubs Cito and Excelsior and was briefly affiliated with SV Hamburg before finally becoming a fully independent football club in the fall of 1897. It was one of the founding members of the DFB (Deutscher Fußball Bund or German Football Association) at Leipzig in 1901. Victoria joined the HAFV (Hamburg-Altonaer Fußball Verband or Hamburg-Altona Football Federation) a year later, capturing the league title in 1905. The team won two consecutive north German championships in 1907 and 1908 and advanced as far as the quarterfinals in national championship play in both seasons.

The club was renamed SC Victoria Hamburg on 10 June 1908. Gyula Kertész coached the side from 1924-28.

In 1933 German football was reorganized under the Third Reich into 16 first division Gauligen. Victoria earned promotion to the Gauliga Nordmark in 1934 and in 1943 won a divisional championship in what had become the Gauliga Hamburg before going out in the first round of the national championship. The team remained in the top flight until the end of World War II.

After the war, occupying Allied authorities banned all organizations in Germany, including sports and football clubs. Victoria was soon re-established and played the 1945 and 1946 seasons in the Stadtliga Hamburg. They were one of four Hamburg sides that joined the newly formed Oberliga Nord (I) for the 1947–48 season where they earned a last place result and were relegated to second-tier play. They made brief re-appearances in the top flight Oberliga in 1951–52 and 1953–54 while spending most of the 50s and 60s in the Amateurliga Hamburg (II).

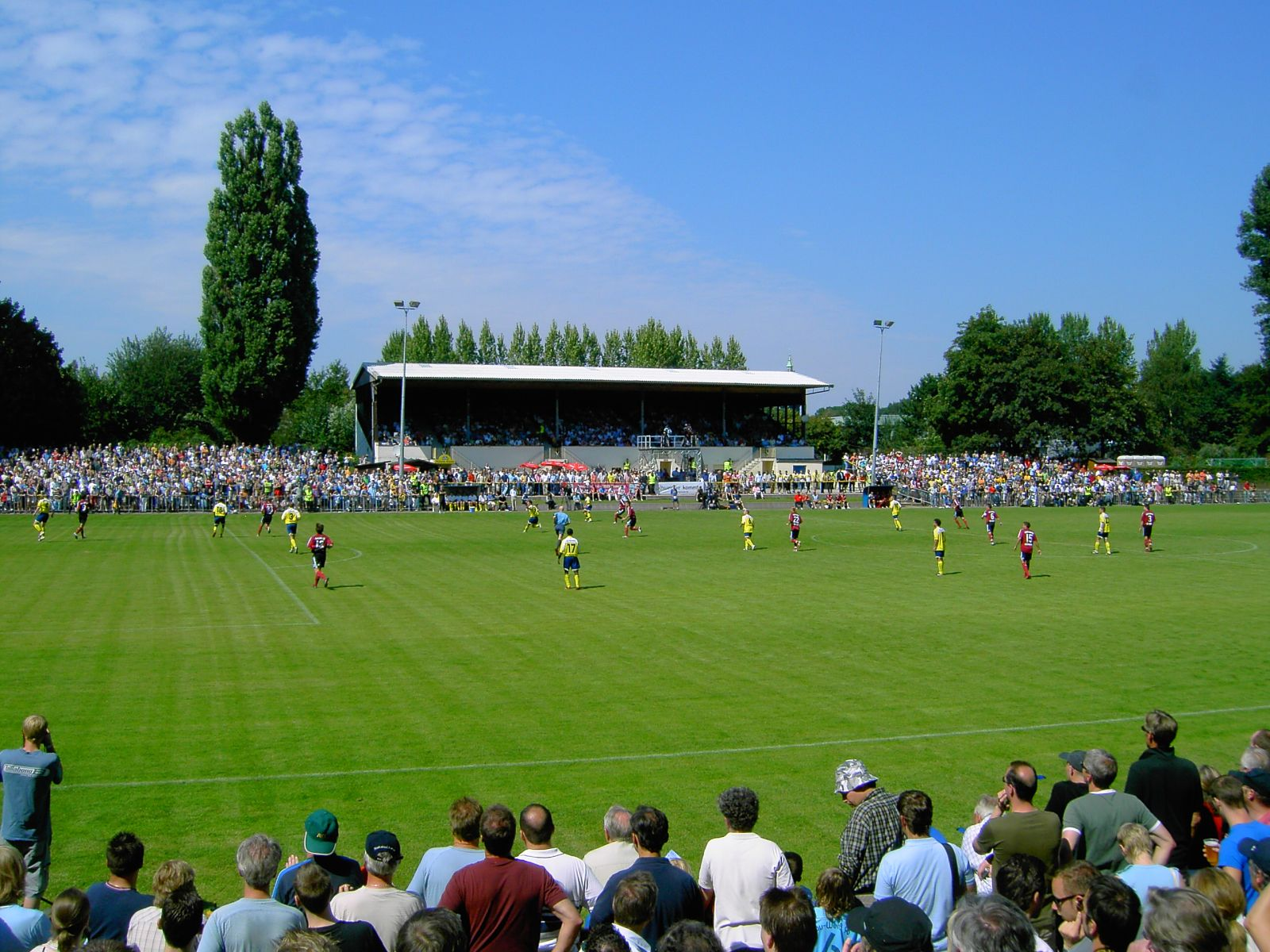
Victoria Stadium during DFB-Pokal match against Nürnberg

After the formation in 1963 of the Bundesliga, Germany's new professional league, Victoria spent three seasons in the Regionalliga Nord (II) before being relegated to the Amateurliga Hamburg (III) and then slipping to the Landesliga Hamburg-Germania (IV) for a single season in 1968–69. They quickly returned to third division play and would compete at that level for the next eight seasons.

In 1977, the club was sent down to the Landesliga Hamburg (IV) and settled into what would become the Verbandsliga Hamburg (IV) for the next 17 seasons. In 1987 several club members left to form Hamburger Club Deportivo Espanol. League re-organization led to the Verbandsliga becoming a fifth division circuit in 1994. Victoria won promotion to the Oberliga Hamburg/Schleswig-Holstein (IV) for a single season but immediately slipped back. They have since played in the fifth division Verbandsliga Hamburg, now commonly known as the Hamburgliga, with the exception of a two-year stint in the Oberliga Hamburg/Schleswig-Holstein / Oberliga Nord (IV) in 2003–05. In 2007, the club won the Hamburg city cup final by defeating VfL 93 Hamburg 1–0. This earned Victoria a place in the 2007–08 DFB-Pokal (German Cup) competition, where they put out in the opening round by first division Bundesliga side 1. FC Nürnberg (0–6).

In the 2010–11 season, they took part in the DFB-Pokal once again and produced a shock result by putting 2. Bundesliga club Rot-Weiß Oberhausen out of the competition in the first round with a 1–0 win. before being defeated 1–3 by VfL Wolfsburg in second round. Victoria did not qualify for the German cup 2011–12, but in that season the club won the Hamburgian Cup and the Oberliga Hamburg, therefore gaining promotion to Regionalliga Nord and qualifying for the German Cup. They were eliminated once again in first round in the 2012–13 season, losing 1–2 against SC Freiburg.

The club was relegated from the Regionalliga in 2014 and now plays in the Oberliga Hamburg again. In the 2015–16 season, Victoria finished third.

== Ground ==
The ground, the Victoria-Stadion Hoheluft, is located next to the University Medical Center Hamburg-Eppendorf. The stadium currently has a capacity of 17,000. The record attendance for the ground was 37,000 during the final of the British Zone Championship in which Hamburger SV beat FC St. Pauli 6–1. Altonaer FC von 1893 also played there during the 2008–09 season.

== Current squad ==
Note: Flags indicate national team as defined under FIFA eligibility rules; some limited exceptions apply. Players may hold more than one non-FIFA nationality.

| No. | Pos. | Nation | Player |
|---|---|---|---|
| 1 | GK | GER | Tobias Grubba |
| 2 | DF | GER | Tim Kreuzer |
| 4 | DF | GER | David Eybächer |
| 5 | DF | GER | Jerry Sampaney |
| 6 | MF | GER | Gary Voorbraak |
| 8 | MF | GER | Kevin Zschimmer |
| 9 | FW | GER | Marcel Rodrigues |
| 10 | MF | GER | Vincent Boock |
| 11 | MF | GER | Jan-Ove Edeling |
| 14 | DF | GER | Torben Wacker |
| 16 | MF | GER | Luis Hacker |
| 17 | DF | GER | Matthias Ribeau |

| No. | Pos. | Nation | Player |
|---|---|---|---|
| 18 | FW | GER | Len Aike Strömer |
| 19 | MF | GER | Stjepan Vego |
| 20 | MF | GER | Sergej Schulz |
| 21 | FW | GER | Julian Schmid |
| 22 | GK | GER | Krister Finnern |
| 23 | DF | GER | Rinik Carolus |
| 24 | DF | GER | Marcus Rabenhorst |
| 25 | GK | GER | Maximilian Richter |
| 26 | MF | KOR | Kangmin Choi |
| 27 | FW | GER | Sepehr Nikroo |
| 31 | MF | GER | Dennis Thiessen |
| 33 | FW | GER | Marius Ebbers |

== Honors ==
The club's honours:

- Northern German football championship
  - Champions: 1906, 1907
- Gauliga Hamburg
  - Champions: 1943
- German amateur football championship
  - Runners-up: 1975
- Verbandsliga Hamburg-Germania (IV)
  - Champions: 1969
- Verbandsliga Hamburg/Oberliga Hamburg (V)
  - Champions: 1951, 1953, 1955, 1960, 1962, 1974, 1995, 2007, 2008, 2009, 2010, 2012
- Hamburger Pokal (Tiers III-X)
  - Winners: 1990, 2007, 2010, 2012, 2013
