= Florian Mohr =

German footballer

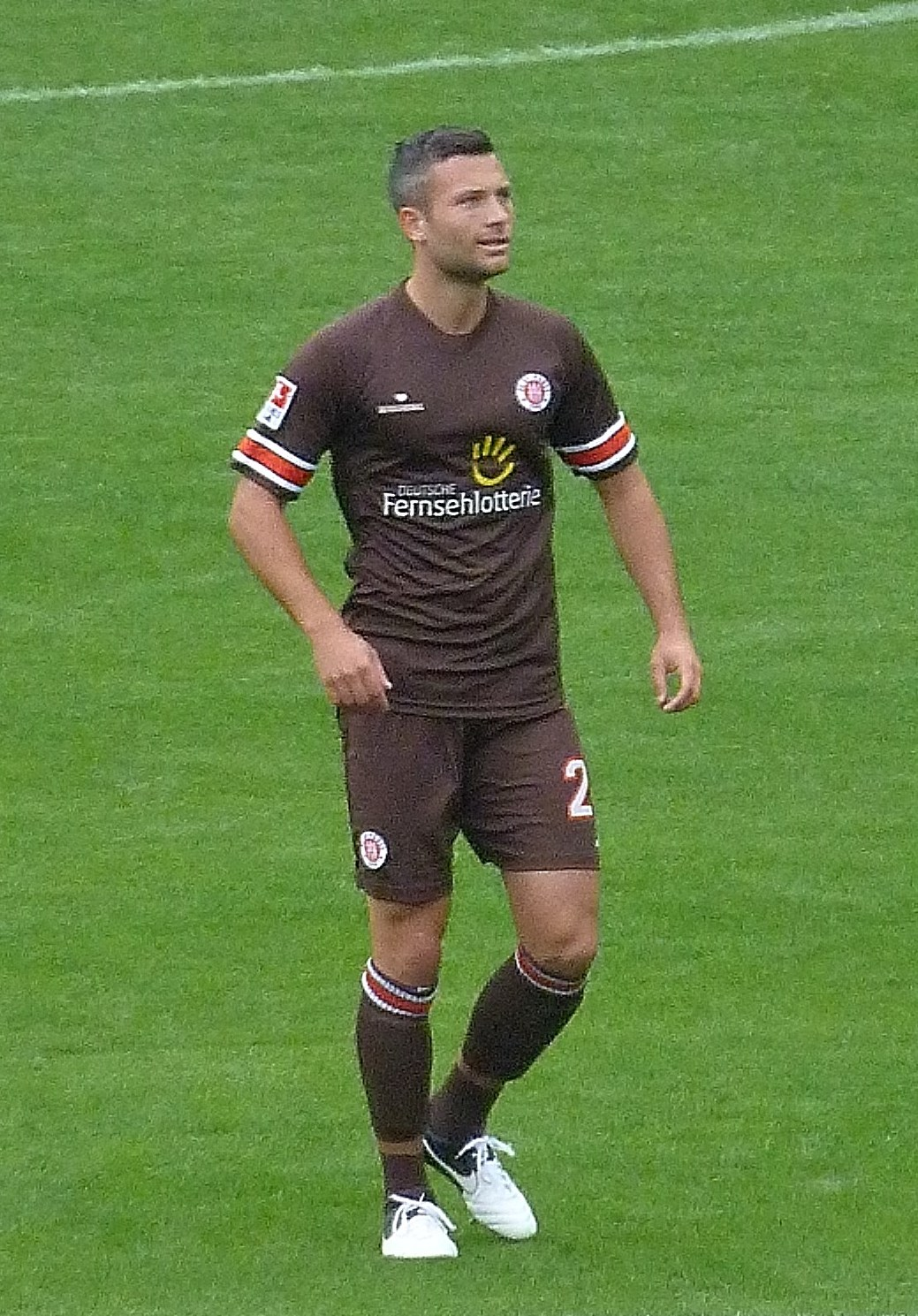
- Mohr with FC St. Pauli in 2012

Personal information
- Full name: Florian Mohr
- Date of birth: 25 August 1984 (age 42)
- Place of birth: Hamburg, West Germany
- Height: 1.82 m (6 ft 0 in)
- Position: Defender

Youth career
- 1988–1993: SC Eilbek
- 1993–2002: SC Concordia von 1907

Senior career*
Years	Team	Apps	(Gls)
2002–2004	SC Concordia von 1907		
2004–2008	Werder Bremen II	125	(0)
2005–2007	Werder Bremen	0	(0)
2008–2012	SC Paderborn	118	(11)
2012–2014	FC St. Pauli	29	(3)
2014–2015	Greuther Fürth	0	(0)
- * Club domestic league appearances and goals

Florian Mohr (born 25 August 1984) is a German former professional footballer who played as a defender.

== Career ==
After his contract with FC St. Pauli expired in summer 2014, he signed for fellow 2. Bundesliga club Greuther Fürth on a two-year deal.
