= Patrick Funk =

German footballer

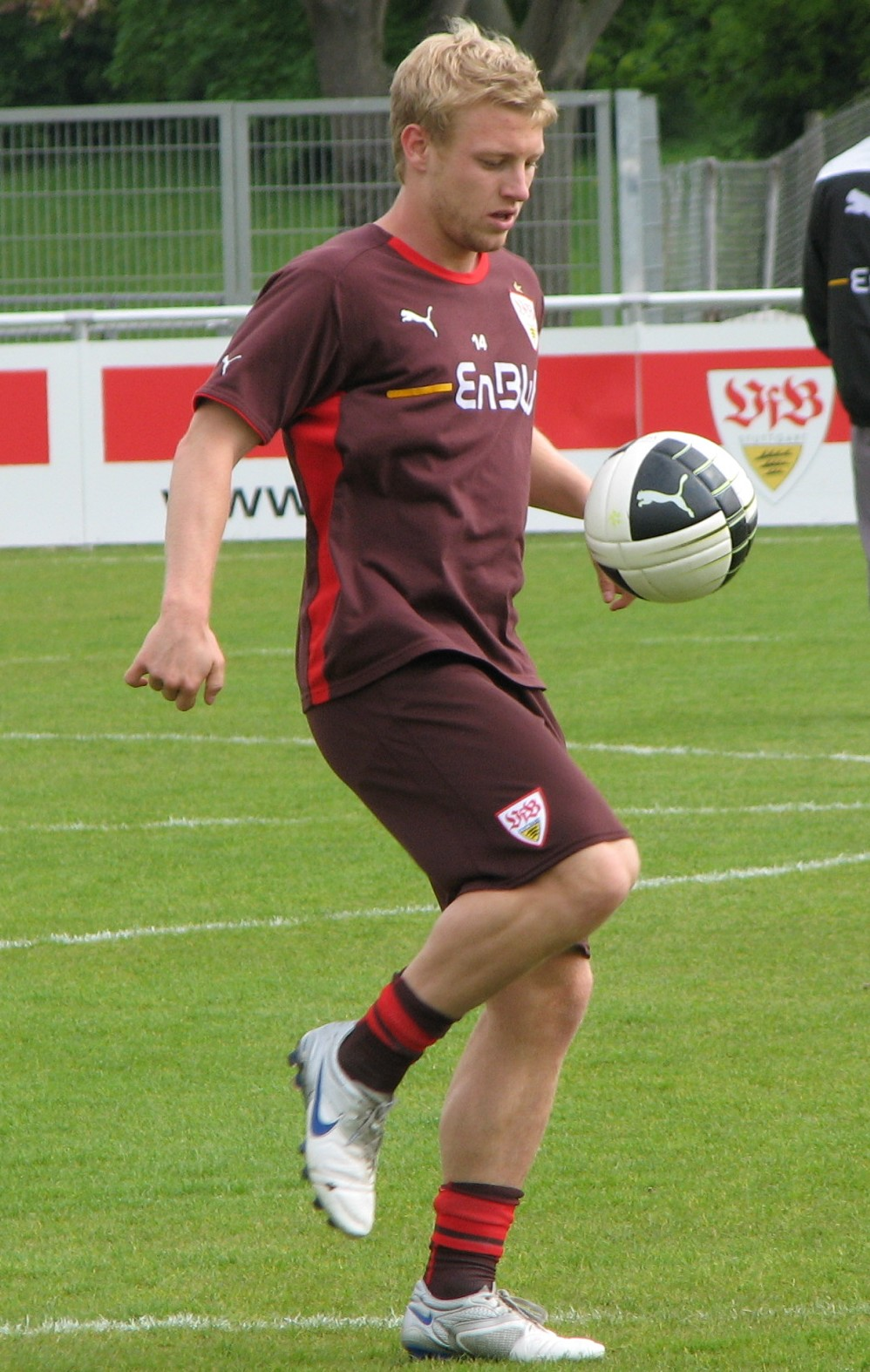

Personal information
- Full name: Patrick Christian Funk
- Date of birth: 11 February 1990 (age 36)
- Place of birth: Aalen, West Germany
- Height: 1.78 m (5 ft 10 in)
- Position: Defensive midfielder

Team information
- Current team: TSV Essingen
- Number: 6

Youth career
- FV Unterkochen
- SV Ebnat
- SSV Ulm 1846
- 2002–2008: VfB Stuttgart

Senior career*
Years	Team	Apps	(Gls)
2008–2014	VfB Stuttgart II	79	(7)
2010–2014	VfB Stuttgart	9	(1)
2011–2013	→ FC St. Pauli (loan)	56	(0)
2014–2018	Wehen Wiesbaden	99	(3)
2018–2019	VfR Aalen	32	(0)
2019–	TSV Essingen	97	(7)

International career
2006–2007	Germany U17	10	(1)
2008	Germany U18	10	(1)
2008–2009	Germany U19	10	(1)
2009–2010	Germany U20	10	(1)
2010–2013	Germany U21	15	(1)
- * Club domestic league appearances and goals as of 13:31, 8 October 2024 (UTC)

Patrick Christian Funk (born 11 February 1990) is a German professional footballer who plays as a defensive midfielder for TSV Essingen.

== Club career ==
Funk started his career with FV 08 Unterkochen and joined later to SV Ebnat. He was scouted by SSV Ulm 1846. After several years with SSV Ulm 1846 he moved to the youth team of VfB Stuttgart in summer 2002.

In July 2011, Funk was loaned out to FC St. Pauli until June 2013.

For the 2014–15 season, Funk moved to SV Wehen Wiesbaden.

== International career ==
Funk was a member of the Germany U21.

== Personal life ==
His brother, Marius Funk, is also a professional footballer.
