= Dennis Daube =

German former professional footballer (born 1989)

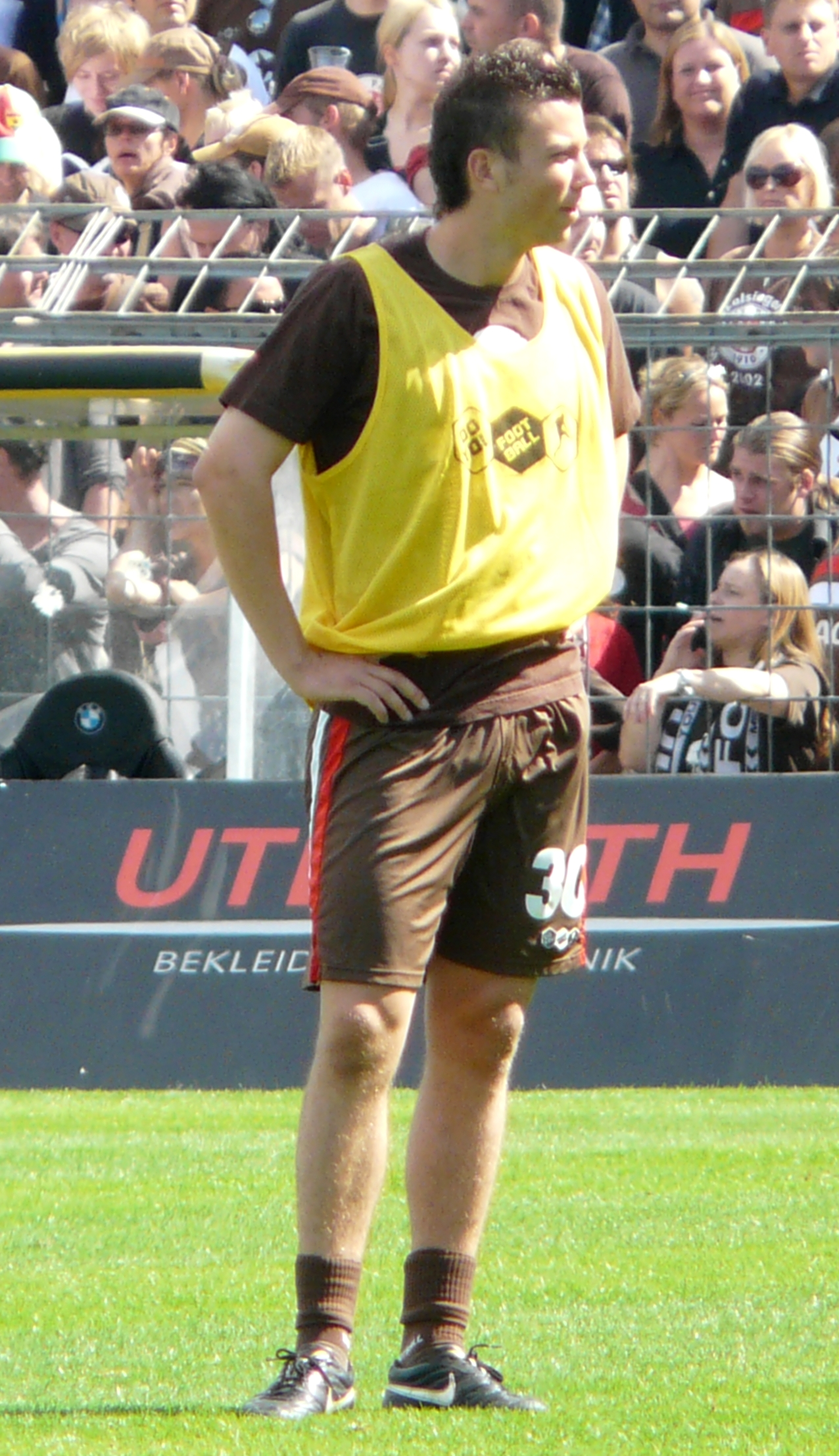
- Daube warming up for FC St. Pauli in 2009

Personal information
- Date of birth: 11 July 1989 (age 37)
- Place of birth: Bergedorf, Hamburg, West Germany
- Height: 1.85 m (6 ft 1 in)
- Position: Defensive midfielder

Youth career
- –2004: SV Nettelnburg–Allermöhe
- 2004–2008: FC St. Pauli

Senior career*
Years	Team	Apps	(Gls)
2008–2015	FC St. Pauli II		
2008–2015	FC St. Pauli	110	(4)
2015–2018	Union Berlin	52	(2)
2018–2020	KFC Uerdingen	21	(0)
2020–2023	Preußen Münster	33	(1)
Total		262	(17)
- * Club domestic league appearances and goals

Dennis Daube (born 11 July 1989) is a German former professional footballer who played as a defensive midfielder. He played in the Bundesliga for FC St. Pauli and the 2. Bundesliga for both FC St. Pauli and Union Berlin, and also had spells with KFC Uerdingen and Preußen Münster.

== Career ==
=== FC St. Pauli ===
Daube was born in the Bergedorf neighbourhood of Hamburg. After playing youth football for SV Nettelnburg–Allermöhe, he joined FC St. Pauli's academy. Daube made his first-team debut as a 78th minute substitute in a 2–0 2. Bundesliga defeat to 1. FC Nürnberg on 19 April 2009, and made two further appearances that season. Daube made 9 league appearances during the first half of the 2009–10 season, but fell out of favour before injury problems ruled him out for the rest of a season in which St. Pauli were promoted to the Bundesliga.

He made his Bundesliga debut as a 42nd-minute substitute in a 3–0 defeat at FC Schalke 04 on 6 November 2010, but after making his first Bundesliga start in the following match against Bayer Leverkusen, he suffered a foot injury in training. He returned to training in January 2011, and made a further 11 Bundesliga appearances as St. Pauli finished bottom of the league and were relegated.

During pre-season for the 2011–12 season, Daube suffered a knee injury during a training camp in Schneverdingen in June 2011, but returned to training the following month. He scored his first St. Pauli goal on 5 November 2011 in a 2–2 draw against Greuther Fürth, and on 6 December 2011, Daube signed a new contract, valid until summer 2014. He ended the season with 27 league appearances, and scored once in 26 league matches across the 2012–13 season.

Daube suffered a knee injury in June 2013, and again in late July, before returning to fitness in December. He then suffered a foot injury in February, meaning he failed to make a league appearance across the 2013–14 season. Despite this, Daube's contract was renewed for a further season and he returned to training in summer 2014. He regained his place in the team the following season under manager Thomas Meggle. Henrik Jacobs of the Hamburger Abendblatt praised Daube's performances and consistency over the 2014–15 season, with Daube scoring twice and providing 8 assists as St. Pauli performed poorly, finishing 15th and avoiding relegation by a single point.

=== Union Berlin ===
In July 2015, after eleven years with FC St. Pauli, Daube moved to fellow 2. Bundesliga side Union Berlin on a free transfer signing a two-year contract.

In July 2016, Daube suffered a tear to a hip muscle but returned to the first team in September. His season was again disrupted by injury when he suffered a shoulder injury in a 3–0 defeat to 1. FC Heidenheim on 9 December, with Daube subsequently undergoing an operation on the shoulder.

On 20 April 2017, Daube's contract with Union Berlin was extended until summer 2018.

His contract expired in summer 2018 and was not renewed.

=== KFC Uerdingen ===
On 14 June 2018, it was announced that Daube joined 3. Liga club KFC Uerdingen on a two-year contract. Daube again suffered a knee injury on 1 September 2018 in a league match against Preußen Münster, in what was his third appearance of the season, Daube recovered from injury following the winter break, but following his first appearance back in February, Daube picked up a further knee injury in training and failed to appear again that season following it.

A ligament tear ruled Daube out for much of the first half of the 2019–20 season, but Daube eventually totalled 17 league appearances that season, 11 of which came after the suspension of the German football season due to the COVID-19 pandemic.

=== Preußen Münster ===
On 21 August 2020, Daube signed for Regionalliga West club Preußen Münster.

Daube suffered a tear in his anterior cruciate ligament of his left knee in September 2021 in a match against Rot-Weiss Essen, In February 2022, his contract was extended until summer 2023 in despite having failed to play since before his injury.

On 22 April 2023, following a 2–0 win over Fortuna Düsseldorf II, Preußen Münster were promoted back to the 3. Liga, and in the 87th minute of a 3–0 win over Rot Weiss Ahlen in the final game of the season, Daube was brought on as a substitute for the final appearance of his career, as Daube retired that summer at the end of his contract.

== After football ==
Following the end of his playing career, Daube retrained as a football scout, working in this capacity for Preußen Münster whilst attaining qualifications, both before and following retirement as a player.

== Style of play ==
Throughout his career, Daube was a versatile midfielder, having been described as a "midfield all-rounder" whilst Uerdingen manager Daniel Steuernagel described Daube as "hard to dispossess, a capable passer, responsible in possession and he runs a lot" ("Er ist ballsicher, passfest, hat ein hohes Verantwortungsbewusstsein bei Ballbesitz und läuft viel").

== Career statistics ==
Appearances and goals by club, season and competition
Club	Season	League			DFB-Pokal		Total	
Club	Season	Division	Apps	Goals	Apps	Goals	Apps	Goals
FC St. Pauli	2008–09	2. Bundesliga	3	0	0	0	3	0
FC St. Pauli	2009–10	2. Bundesliga	9	0	0	0	9	0
FC St. Pauli	2010–11	Bundesliga	13	0	0	0	13	0
FC St. Pauli	2011–12	2. Bundesliga	27	1	1	0	28	1
FC St. Pauli	2012–13	2. Bundesliga	26	1	1	0	27	1
FC St. Pauli	2013–14	2. Bundesliga	0	0	0	0	0	0
FC St. Pauli	2014–15	2. Bundesliga	32	2	1	0	33	2
FC St. Pauli	Total		110	4	3	0	113	4
Union Berlin	2015–16	2. Bundesliga	23	1	0	0	23	1
Union Berlin	2016–17	2. Bundesliga	14	1	0	0	14	1
Union Berlin	2017–18	2. Bundesliga	15	0	1	1	16	1
Union Berlin	Total		52	2	1	1	53	3
KFC Uerdingen	2018–19	3. Liga	4	0	—		4	0
KFC Uerdingen	2019–20	3. Liga	17	0	0	0	17	0
KFC Uerdingen	Total		21	0	0	0	21	0
Preußen Münster	2020–21	Regionalliga West	24	1	—		24	1
Preußen Münster	2021–22	Regionalliga West	8	0	1	0	9	0
Preußen Münster	2022–23	Regionalliga West	1	0	—		1	0
Preußen Münster	Total		33	1	1	0	34	1
Career total			216	7	5	1	221	8
