= Deniz Naki =

German footballer (born 1989)

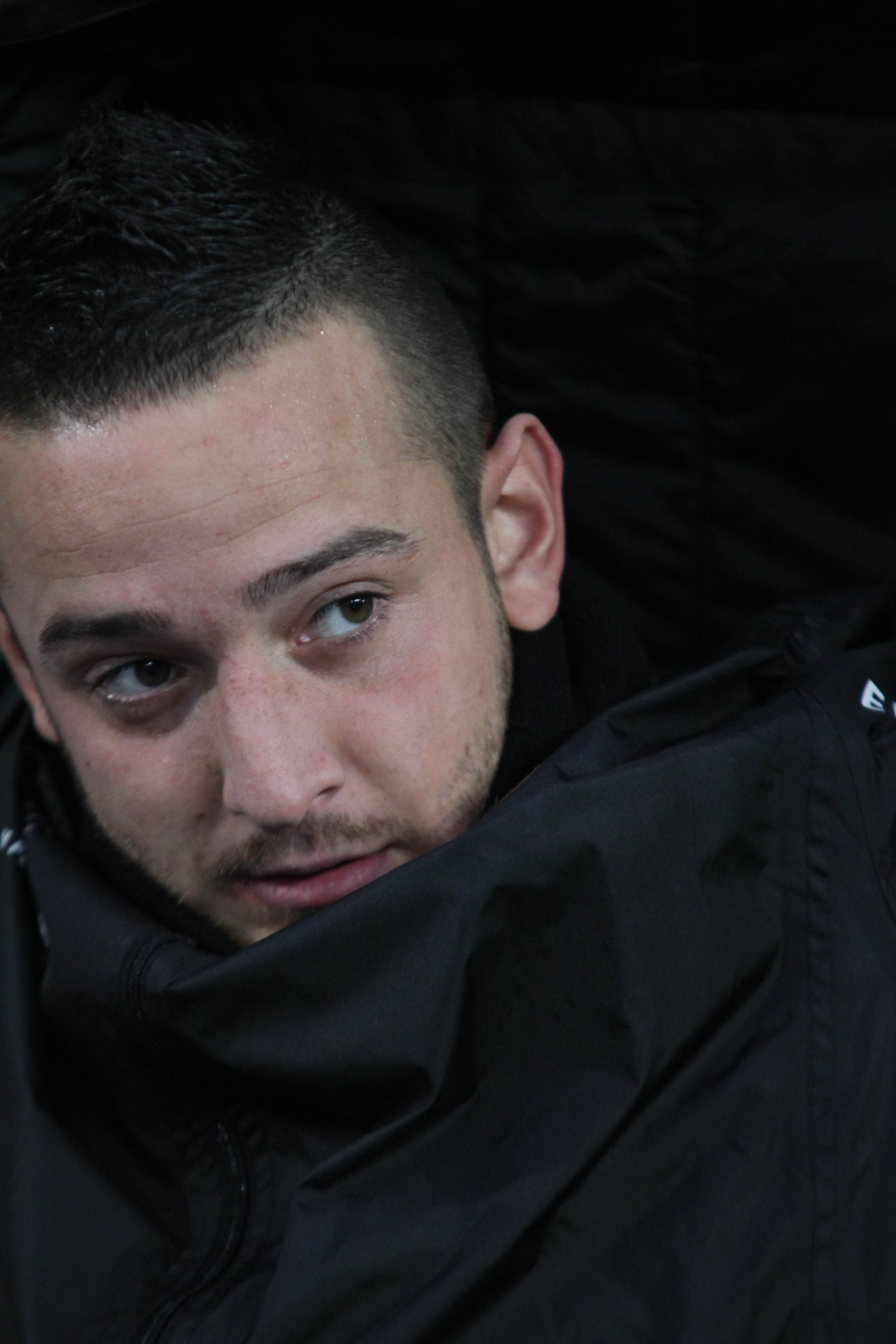
- Naki in 2012

Personal information
- Full name: Deniz Naki
- Date of birth: 9 July 1989 (age 37)
- Place of birth: Düren, West Germany
- Height: 1.67 m (5 ft 6 in)
- Position: Attacking midfielder

Youth career
- 2001–2003: FC Düren 77
- 2003–2005: FC Düren-Niederau
- 2005–2007: Bayer Leverkusen

Senior career*
Years	Team	Apps	(Gls)
2007–2009	Bayer Leverkusen II	36	(7)
2009	→ Rot Weiss Ahlen (loan)	11	(4)
2009–2012	FC St. Pauli	71	(12)
2011	FC St. Pauli II	1	(1)
2012–2013	SC Paderborn	23	(2)
2013–2014	Gençlerbirliği	21	(0)
2015–2018	Amed S.K.	58	(28)
2023	SV. Kurdistan	1	(1)
Total		231	(54)

International career
2007–2008	Germany U19	15	(9)
2008–2009	Germany U20	6	(3)
- * Club domestic league appearances and goals

Deniz Naki (born 9 July 1989) is a German professional footballer who played as an attacking midfielder. Düren wears jersey number 21 in the 6th League team SV. Kurdistan.

== Club career ==
Naki began his football career at Bayer 04 Leverkusen, but could never make it past its reserves.

On 2 February 2009, he was loaned to Rot Weiss Ahlen, playing eleven games and scoring four goals in his short spell. On 8 February, he made his professional debut in the second division, coming on as a 79th-minute substitute for Marco Reus in a match against FC Augsburg.

On 25 June 2009, Naki left Bayer Leverkusen and signed a three-year contract with FC St. Pauli at the Millerntor-Stadion. He caused controversy on 2 November when, after scoring his team's second goal away at rivals FC Hansa Rostock (2–0 win), he celebrated with a 'cut-throat' gesture towards the opposing fans. He helped with seven league goals as St. Pauli returned to the top level.

Following an unsuccessful trial at Nottingham Forest, Naki completed a move to SC Paderborn 07, signing a two-year contract with the 2. Bundesliga side in the summer of 2012.

On 5 November 2014, Naki decided to leave Gençlerbirliği after an alleged racist attack. Naki said he was attacked on the street in the Turkish capital by three men shouting racist abuse and challenging him over his support for the Syrian-Kurdish town of Kobane, which is battling a siege by Islamic State (ISIS).

In February 2016, Naki, playing for Amed SK, was suspended for 12 games and received a large fine after allegedly expressing support for the PKK, in the Kurdish-Turkish conflict. He had written on his personal Facebook page that he dedicated the victory, a win over Bursaspor in the Turkish Cup, to those killed and wounded "under the oppression that has gone on for 50 days in our land," referring to the imposed curfews in numerous Turkish towns with large groups of Kurdish ethnicity.

In October 2016, Naki was charged with ‘promoting terrorist propaganda’ by a Turkish court on the basis of social media posts. According to writer Patrick Keddie, "In November 2016, a court acquitted Naki of all charges, but the prosecution appealed and in April 2017 he was given an 18-month suspended prison sentence – putting him on probation for five years."

In June 2021, he was tried at the Aachen Regional Court for founding an organized crime syndicate, supporting a terrorist organization, drug dealing, blackmail and arson. He has been detained in Germany since July 2020. The request to be tried pending trial is rejected on the grounds that "there is a risk of escaping and obscuring evidence".

He was detained in Germany for 2 years, He was released in 2023 and returned to the field again.

== International career ==
As a member of the Germany U-19 team, Naki represented the nation at the 2008 UEFA European Under-19 Football Championship, played in the Czech Republic.

== Personal incidents ==
In January 2018, shots were fired at his car on Bundesautobahn 4 near his hometown, Düren. In March 2018, Deniz Naki started a hunger strike in front of the UN building in Geneva, in protest against Operation Olive Branch by Turkish Armed Forces.

On 26 July 2018, Naki published a letter in which he called Mesut Özil to take actions against racism in Turkey. Özil had previously criticized the German Football Association for the lack of support after racist hostilities against him related to his photos with Turkish President Recep Tayyip Erdoğan, in which he retired from playing for the Germany national team, and had also defended his photos with Erdoğan as being unpolitical.

== Career statistics ==
As of 1 July 2018

Appearances and goals by club, season and competition
Club	Season	League			Cup		Continental		Other		Total	
Club	Season	Division	Apps	Goals	Apps	Goals	Apps	Goals	Apps	Goals	Apps	Goals
Bayer Leverkusen II	2008–09	Oberliga Nordrhein	25	5	1	0	–		0	0	26	5
Bayer Leverkusen II	2009–10	Regionalliga West	11	2	0	0	–		0	0	11	2
Bayer Leverkusen II	Total		36	7	1	0	0	0	0	0	37	7
Rot Weiss Ahlen (loan)	2008–09	2. Bundesliga	11	4	0	0	–		0	0	11	4
FC St. Pauli	2009–10	2. Bundesliga	30	7	2	2	–		0	0	32	9
FC St. Pauli	2010–11	Bundesliga	20	1	1	0	–		0	0	21	1
FC St. Pauli	2011–12	2. Bundesliga	21	4	0	0	–		0	0	21	4
FC St. Pauli	Total		71	12	3	2	0	0	0	0	74	14
FC St. Pauli II	2011–12	Regionalliga Nord	1	1	0	0	–		0	0	1	1
SC Paderborn	2012–13	2. Bundesliga	23	2	0	0	–		0	0	23	2
Gençlerbirliği	2013–14	Süper Lig	16	0	3	1	0	0	0	0	19	1
Gençlerbirliği	2014–15	Süper Lig	5	0	1	0	0	0	0	0	6	0
Gençlerbirliği	Total		21	0	4	1	0	0	0	0	25	1
Amed S.K.	2015–16	TFF First League	18	4	9	3	–		0	0	27	7
Amed S.K.	2016–17	TFF First League	28	16	4	2	–		0	0	32	18
Amed S.K.	2017–18	TFF First League	12	8	2	1	–		0	0	14	9
Amed S.K.	Total		58	28	15	6	0	0	0	0	73	34
Career total			231	54	23	9	0	0	0	0	254	63

== Honours ==
Germany Youth

- UEFA European Under-19 Championship: 2008
