= Marcel Andrijanić =

German footballer

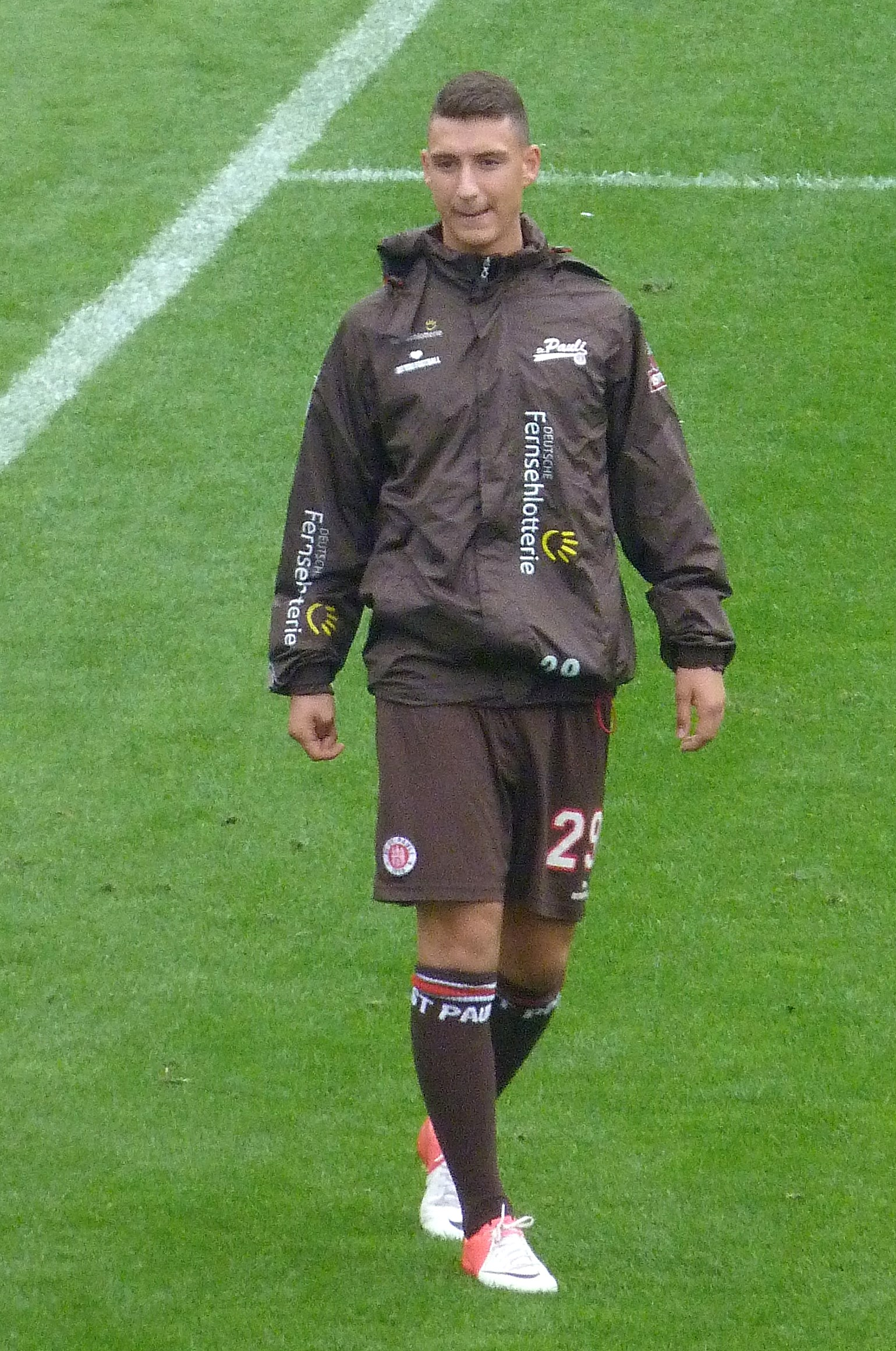
- Andrijanić in 2012

Personal information
- Date of birth: 21 October 1992 (age 34)
- Place of birth: Hamburg, Germany
- Height: 1.86 m (6 ft 1 in)
- Position: Midfielder

Team information
- Current team: FC Süderelbe

Youth career
- Germania Schnelsen
- –2003: Hamburger SV
- 2003–2011: FC St. Pauli

Senior career*
Years	Team	Apps	(Gls)
2011–2013	FC St. Pauli II	53	(9)
2012–2013	FC St. Pauli	1	(0)
2013–2014	Hessen Kassel	18	(1)
2014–2015	SV Rödinghausen	12	(0)
2015–2017	TuS Erndtebrück	61	(10)
2017–2021	SV Drochtersen/Assel	88	(12)
2021–2022	FC Teutonia Ottensen	23	(4)
2022–2023	SSV Jeddeloh	32	(5)
2023–2024	ETSV Hamburg	25	(5)
2024–	FC Süderelbe	0	(0)
- * Club domestic league appearances and goals as of 17 May 2024

Marcel Andrijanić (born 21 October 1992) is a German footballer who plays as a midfielder for Oberliga Hamburg club FC Süderelbe.
