= Fabio Morena =

German footballer

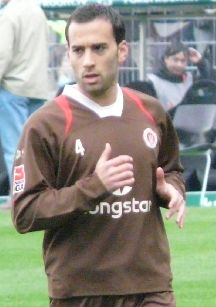
- Morena with FC St. Pauli in 2008

Personal information
- Date of birth: 19 March 1980 (age 46)
- Place of birth: Musberg, West Germany
- Height: 1.80 m (5 ft 11 in)
- Position: Defender

Youth career
- 1984–1990: TSV Musberg
- 1990–1995: Stuttgarter Kickers
- 1995–1998: VfB Stuttgart

Senior career*
Years	Team	Apps	(Gls)
1999–2002	VfB Stuttgart II	58	(1)
2002–2003	Alicante	21	(0)
2003–2012	FC St. Pauli	232	(4)
2012–2013	SV Sandhausen	15	(0)
2013–2015	Hamburger SV II	21	(1)
Total		347	(6)
- * Club domestic league appearances and goals

Fabio Morena (born 19 March 1980 in Musberg, West Germany) is a German former professional footballer who played as a defender.
