= Benedikt Pliquett =

German footballer

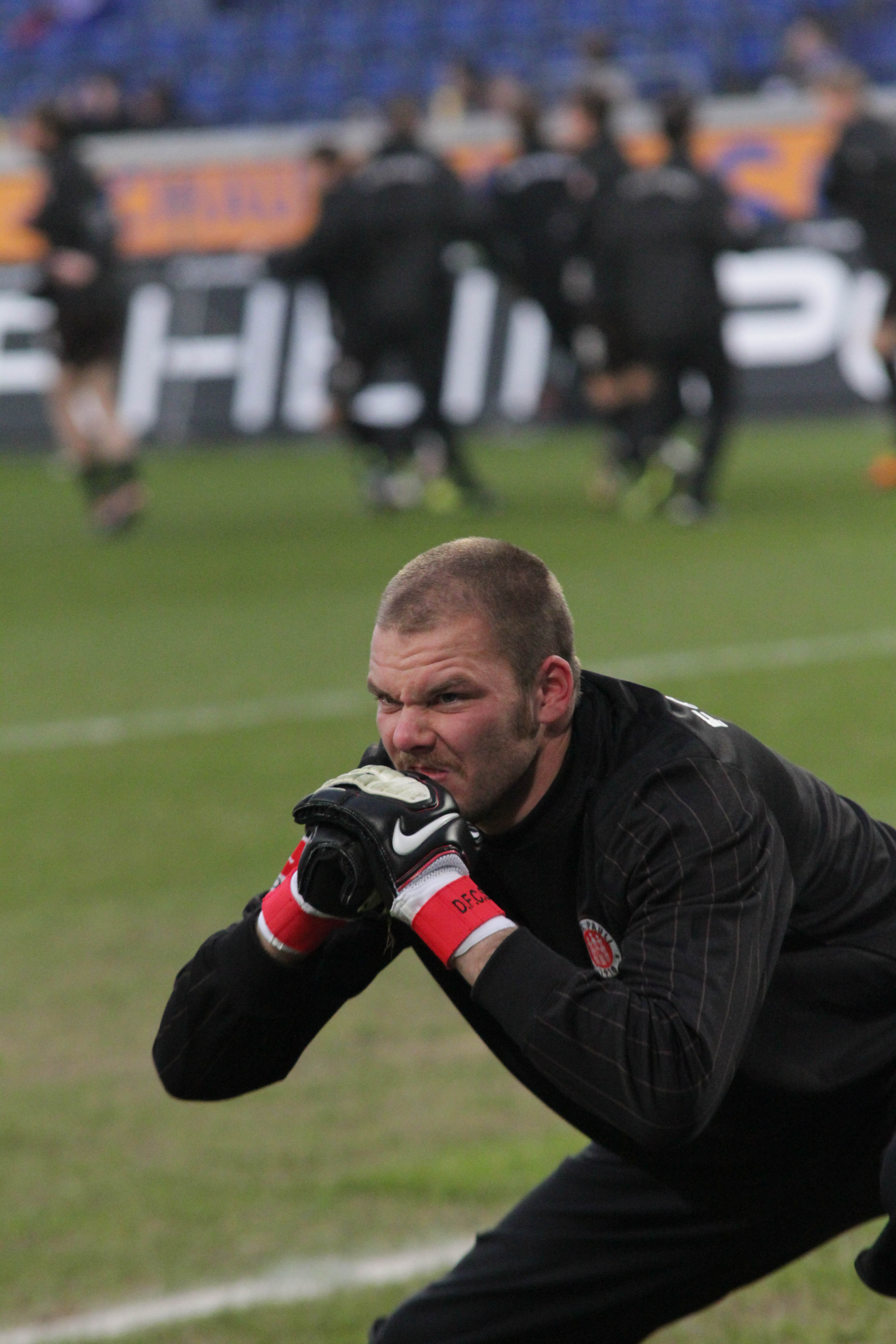
- Pliquett with St. Pauli in 2012

Personal information
- Date of birth: 20 December 1984 (age 41)
- Place of birth: Hamburg, West Germany
- Height: 1.99 m (6 ft 6 in)
- Position: Goalkeeper

Youth career
- 1991–1998: SSC Hagen Ahrensburg
- 1998–2000: VfL Oldesloe
- 2000–2002: Hamburger SV

Senior career*
Years	Team	Apps	(Gls)
2002–2003	Hamburger SV	0	(0)
2004	VfB Lübeck	0	(0)
2004–2013	FC St. Pauli II	48	(0)
2004–2013	FC St. Pauli	43	(0)
2013–2015	Sturm Graz	26	(0)
2015–2016	Atlético Baleares	20	(0)
Total		137	(0)
- * Club domestic league appearances and goals

Benedikt Pliquett (born 20 December 1984) is a German former professional footballer who played as a goalkeeper.
