= Marius Ebbers =

German footballer

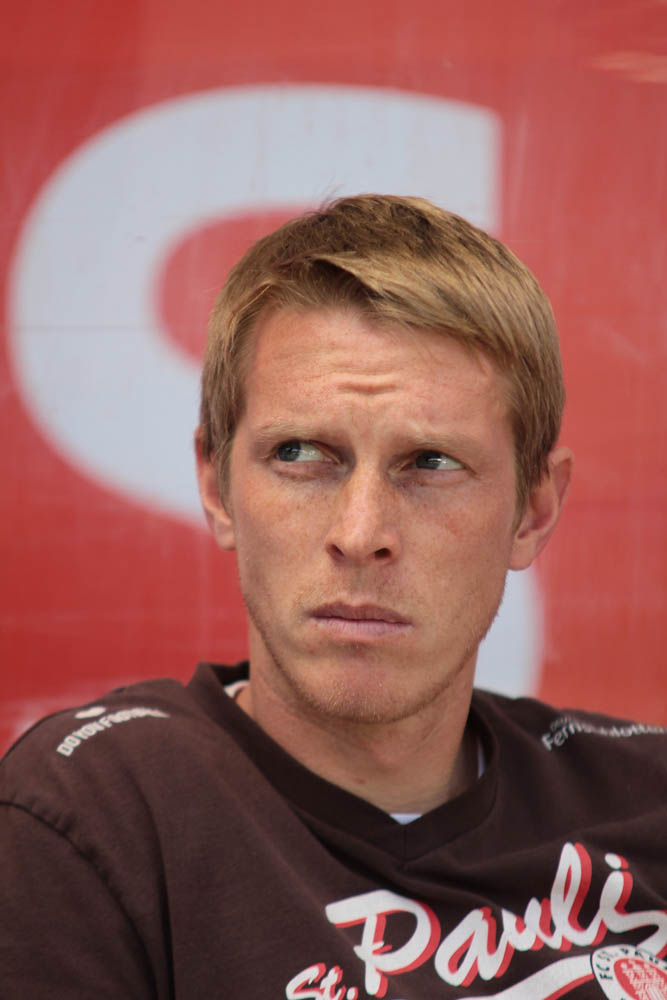
- Ebbers with FC St. Pauli in 2013

Personal information
- Date of birth: 4 January 1978 (age 48)
- Place of birth: Essen, West Germany
- Height: 1.92 m (6 ft 4 in)
- Position: Forward

Team information
- Current team: SC Victoria (assistant)

Youth career
- 1986–1993: SG Wattenscheid 09
- 1983–1995: Schwarz-Weiß Essen
- 1995–1998: MSV Duisburg

Senior career*
Years	Team	Apps	(Gls)
1998–1999	MSV Duisburg	2	(0)
1999–2000	SG Wattenscheid 09	16	(12)
2001–2003	MSV Duisburg	78	(32)
2003–2005	1. FC Köln	48	(10)
2005–2008	Alemannia Aachen	84	(20)
2008–2013	FC St. Pauli	138	(46)
2013–2014	VfL 93 Hamburg	1	(2)
2014	Fort Lauderdale Strikers	8	(1)
2014–2017	SC Victoria	78	(60)

Managerial career
- 2017–2018: SC Victoria (assistant)
- 2019–: SC Victoria (assistant)
- * Club domestic league appearances and goals

Marius Ebbers (born 4 January 1978) is a German former professional footballer who played as a forward. He works as assistant manager of SC Victoria.

== Playing career ==
Ebbers scored 108 goals in the Bundesliga and 2. Bundesliga, the first two levels of the German football league system. He played for a couple of months abroad in 2014 - at Fort Lauderdale Strikers in the North American Soccer League.

== Coaching career ==
Ebbers retired in June 2017, and was immediately hired as assistant manager of the club he last played for, SC Victoria. He left his position one year. However, he re-joined his position again in January 2019, when his former teammate from FC St. Pauli, Fabian Boll, became the new manager of the club.

== Outside football ==
Ebbers owns Ebb & Flow, a clothing store in Hamburg. He started a "relief campaign for the homeless."
