= Markus Thorandt =

German footballer (born 1981)

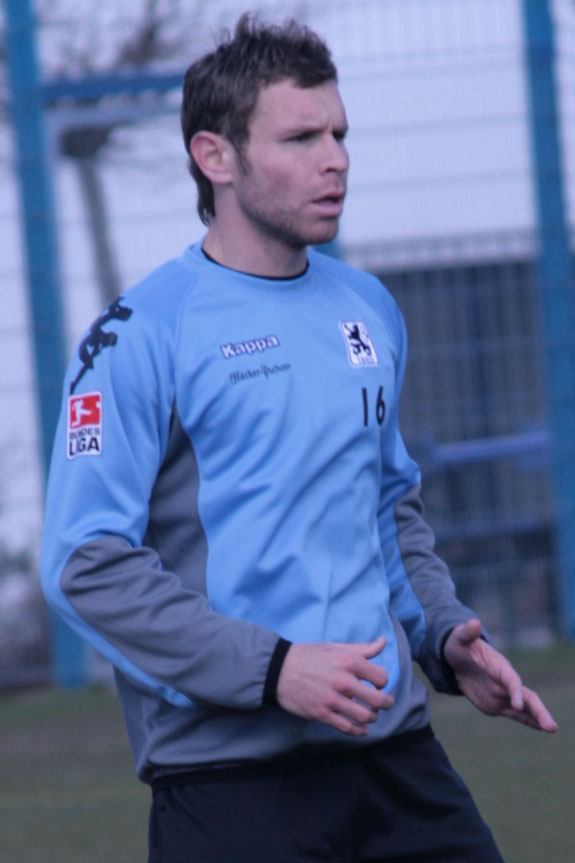
- Thorandt in 2007

Personal information
- Date of birth: 1 April 1981 (age 45)
- Place of birth: Augsburg, West Germany
- Height: 1.86 m (6 ft 1 in)
- Position: Defender

Youth career
- 1986–1997: TSV Königsbrunn
- 1997–2000: FC Augsburg

Senior career*
Years	Team	Apps	(Gls)
2000–2006	FC Augsburg	95	(7)
2006–2009	1860 Munich	75	(5)
2009–2015	FC St. Pauli	139	(4)
2009	FC St. Pauli II	1	(0)
Total		310	(16)
- * Club domestic league appearances and goals

Markus Thorandt (born 1 April 1981) is a German former professional footballer who played as a defender.

== Career ==
Thorandt began his career with TSV Königsbrunn and left the club in 1997 to sign with FC Augsburg. After nine years, he left FC Augsburg and signed with TSV 1860 Munich. Here he made his professional debut in the 2. Bundesliga for 1860 Munich on 22 October 2006 in a match against 1. FC Kaiserslautern.

On 18 May 2009, Thorandt signed a three-year contract with FC St. Pauli. During the 2014–15 season, Thorandt suffered a severe injury of his right knee and could only participate in two league matches. Subsequently, he did not receive an extension of his expiring contract and had to leave St. Pauli after six years.
