= 2014–15 Oberliga Hamburg =

- Season: 2014–15
- Champions: TuS Dassendorf
- Relegated: FC Elmshorn Germania Schnelsen SC Vier- und Marschlande
- Matches: 306
- Top goalscorer: Eric Agyemang, Jan-Marc Schneider (29 goals)
- Total attendance: 73,732
- Average attendance: 253
- All statistics correct as of 19 May 2016.

The 2014–15 season of the Oberliga Hamburg, the highest association football league in the German state of Hamburg, was the seventh season of the league at tier five (V) of the German football league system.

== League table ==
The 2014–15 season saw four new clubs in the league, FC Süderelbe, USC Paloma and Buxtehuder SV, all promoted from the Landesligas while SC Victoria Hamburg had been relegated from the Regionalliga Nord to the league.

League champions TuS Dassendorf declined to apply for a licence for the Regionalliga Nord. Runners-up SC Victoria Hamburg was granted a Regionalliga licence but later declined participation in the promotion round to the league. FC Elmshorn withdrew from the league during the season, in December 2014, and had its record expunged.

Pos	Team	Pld	W	D	L	GF	GA	GD	Pts	Relegation
1	TuS Dassendorf (C)	32	21	5	6	82	30	+52	68	
2	SC Victoria Hamburg	32	19	7	6	72	40	+32	64	
3	HSV Barmbek-Uhlenhorst	32	18	7	7	60	35	+25	61	
4	VfL Pinneberg	32	16	8	8	54	38	+16	56	
5	SV Halstenbek-Rellingen	32	16	6	10	80	49	+31	54	
6	TSV Buchholz	32	14	10	8	55	37	+18	52	
7	Altona 93	32	14	9	9	61	38	+23	51	
8	Niendorfer TSV	32	15	5	12	56	50	+6	50	
9	Rugenbergen	32	14	7	11	44	41	+3	49	
10	Meiendorfer SV	32	15	4	13	47	51	−4	49	
11	Condor Hamburg	32	11	10	11	62	59	+3	43	
12	FC Süderelbe	32	12	5	15	47	49	−2	41	
13	SV Curslack-Neuengamme	32	10	10	12	51	57	−6	40	
14	USC Paloma	32	11	3	18	41	69	−28	36	
15	Buxtehuder SV	32	6	5	21	35	71	−36	23	
16	SC Vier- und Marschlande (R)	32	4	4	24	38	92	−54	16	Relegation to Landesliga
17	Germania Schnelsen (R)	32	2	3	27	26	105	−79	9	Relegation to Landesliga
18	FC Elmshorn (Note: FC Elmshorn withdrew from the league in December 2014, record expunged.) (R)	0	0	0	0	0	0	0	0	Withdrawn to Landesliga

Source: soccerway.com
Rules for classification: 1) Points; 2) Goal difference; 3) Goals scored; 4) head-to-head results; 5) goals scored away from home against opponent; 6) goals scored away from home; 7) drawing of lots
(C) Champions; (R) Relegated

=== Top goalscorers ===
The top goal scorers for the season:

Rank	Player	Club	Goals
1	(Ghana) Eric Agyemang	TuS Dassendorf	29
1	(Germany) Jan-Marc Schneider	SV Halstenbek-Rellingen	29
3	(Germany) Marius Ebbers	SC Victoria Hamburg	23
4	(Germany) Arne Gillich	TSV Buchholz 08	21

== Promotion round ==
The two runners-up of the Landesliga divisions, Hammonia and Hansa, competed against each other for one more spot in the Oberliga for the following season:

Team 1	Agg.	Team 2	1st leg	2nd leg
TuS Osdorf	2–4	Wandsbeker TSV Concordia	2–1	0–3
