= 2015–16 Oberliga Hamburg =

- Season: 2015–16
- Champions: TuS Dassendorf
- Relegated: Meiendorfer SV USC Paloma SV Lurup
- Matches: 306
- Top goalscorer: Benjamin Bambur (28 goals)
- Total attendance: 69,172
- Average attendance: 234
- All statistics correct as of 21 May 2016.

The 2015–16 season of the Oberliga Hamburg, the highest association football league in the German state of Hamburg, was the eighth season of the league at tier five (V) of the German football league system.

The season began on 31 July 2015 and finished on 21 May 2016, interrupted by a winter break from 19 December to 31 January.

== 2015–16 standings ==
The 2015–16 season saw three new clubs in the league, SV Lurup, FC Türkiye and WTSV Concordia, all promoted from the Landesligas while no club had been relegated from the Regionalliga Nord to the league.

Of the Oberliga Hamburg teams only Altona 93 applied for a Regionalliga licence for the 2016–17 season, with the Northern German Football Association deciding on 9 May 2016 to grant all applicants a licence.

Pos	Team	Pld	W	D	L	GF	GA	GD	Pts	Qualification or relegation
1	TuS Dassendorf	34	21	9	4	80	22	+58	72	
2	HSV Barmbek-Uhlenhorst	34	21	8	5	75	34	+41	71	
3	Victoria Hamburg	34	19	6	9	79	43	+36	63	
4	FC Süderelbe	34	18	6	10	95	34	+61	60	
5	TSV Buchholz 08	34	18	6	10	73	37	+36	60	
6	Altona 93 (Q)	34	17	6	11	65	41	+24	57	Qualification to promotion playoffs
7	SC Condor Hamburg	34	15	9	10	73	56	+17	54	
8	SC Rugenbergen	34	15	6	13	67	52	+15	51	
9	SV Curslack-Neuengamme	34	13	11	10	72	50	+22	50	
10	SV Halstenbek-Rellingen	34	13	10	11	60	44	+16	49	
11	WTSV Concordia	34	13	8	13	82	61	+21	47	
12	Niendorfer TSV	34	13	7	14	56	39	+17	46	
13	VfL Pinneberg	34	11	11	12	48	43	+5	44	
14	FC Türkiye	34	12	4	18	56	73	−17	40	
15	Buxtehuder SV	34	10	9	15	51	72	−21	39	
16	Meiendorfer SV (R)	34	10	5	19	48	77	−29	35	Relegation to Landesliga
17	Uhlenhorster SC Paloma (R)	34	5	2	27	42	105	−63	17	Relegation to Landesliga
18	SV Lurup (R)	34	0	1	33	13	252	−239	1	Relegation to Landesliga

Source: soccerway.com
Rules for classification: 1) Points; 2) Goal difference; 3) Goals scored; 4) head-to-head results; 5) goals scored away from home against opponent; 6) goals scored away from home; 7) drawing of lots
(Q) Qualified for the phase indicated; (R) Relegated

=== Top goalscorers ===
The top goal scorers for the season:

Rank	Player	Club	Goals
1	(Germany) Benjamin Bambur	WTSV Concordia	28
2	(Germany) Pascal Haase	SC Rugenbergen	24
3	(Germany) Mustafa Karaaslan	BSV Buxtehude FC Süderelbe	21
4	(Germany) Tolga Tüter	FC Süderelbe	20

== Promotion play-off ==
Promotion play-off were to be held at the end of the season to the Regionalliga Nord. The runners-up of the Niedersachsenliga and the champions or, in Hamburg's case, the only team applying for a licence, of the Bremen-Liga, Oberliga Hamburg and Schleswig-Holstein-Liga played each other for two more spot in the Regionalliga. In the promotion round each team met the other just once with the two highest-placed teams in the final table promoted:

Pos	Team	Pld	W	D	L	GF	GA	GD	Pts	Promotion	GER	SVE	ALT	BSV
1	Germania Egestorf (P)	3	1	2	0	5	4	+1	5	Promotion to Regionalliga Nord	—	2–2	2–1	—
2	SV Eichede (P)	3	1	2	0	5	4	+1	5	Promotion to Regionalliga Nord	—	—	—	2–1
3	Altona 93	3	1	1	1	4	3	+1	4		—	1–1	—	—
4	Bremer SV	3	0	1	2	2	5	−3	1		1–1	—	0–2	—

Source: Weltfussball.de
Rules for classification: 1) Points; 2) Head-to-head; 3) Decider;
(P) Promoted
