= 2011–12 Oberliga Hamburg =

Oberliga Hamburg
- Season: 2011–12
- Champions: SC Victoria Hamburg
- Promoted: SC Victoria Hamburg
- Relegated: Oststeinbeker SV Vorwärts-Wacker Billstedt TSV Sasel
- Matches: 306

The 2011–12 season of the Oberliga Hamburg, the highest association football league in the German state of Hamburg, was the fourth season of the league at tier five (V) of the German football league system.

== Table ==
The 2011–12 season saw five new clubs in the league, VfL Pinneberg, SV Halstenbek-Rellingen, SC Vier- und Marschlande, Vorwärts-Wacker Billstedt and TSV Sasel, all promoted from the Landesligas while no club had been relegated from the Regionalliga Nord to the league.

Pos	Team	Pld	W	D	L	GF	GA	GD	Pts	Promotion, qualification or relegation
1	SC Victoria Hamburg (C, P)	34	21	8	5	73	36	+37	71	Promotion to Regionalliga Nord
2	FC Bergedorf 85	34	20	5	9	73	51	+22	65	
3	SV Curslack-Neuengamme	34	20	4	10	63	41	+22	64	
4	Germania Schnelsen	34	18	6	10	66	49	+17	60	
5	TSV Buchholz 08	34	17	8	9	55	39	+16	59	
6	Eintracht Norderstedt	34	17	7	10	62	37	+25	58	
7	SC Condor Hamburg	34	17	6	11	54	44	+10	57	
8	Niendorfer TSV	34	16	7	11	62	51	+11	55	
9	Altona 93	34	16	5	13	55	48	+7	53	
10	VfL Pinneberg	34	15	4	15	57	55	+2	49	
11	SV Halstenbek-Rellingen	34	13	7	14	46	52	−6	46	
12	Meiendorfer SV	34	12	6	16	56	57	−1	42	
13	SC Vier- und Marschlande	34	11	7	16	55	70	−15	40	
14	SV Rugenbergen	34	10	8	16	51	62	−11	38	
15	USC Paloma	34	11	5	18	38	58	−20	38	
16	Oststeinbeker SV (R)	34	9	7	18	36	58	−22	34	Relegation to Landesliga
17	Vorwärts-Wacker Billstedt (R)	34	5	7	22	45	77	−32	22	Relegation to Landesliga
18	TSV Sasel (R)	34	1	7	26	38	100	−62	10	Relegation to Landesliga

Source: soccerway.com
Rules for classification: 1) Points; 2) Goal difference; 3) Goals scored; 4) head-to-head results; 5) goals scored away from home against opponent; 6) goals scored away from home; 7) drawing of lots
(C) Champions; (P) Promoted; (R) Relegated
