= 2016–17 Oberliga Hamburg =

Oberliga Hamburg
- Season: 2016–17
- Dates: 29 July 2016 – 26 May 2017
- Champions: TuS Dassendorf; 5th Oberliga Hamburg title
- Relegated: SV Halstenbek-Rellingen; Klub Kosova; BSV Buxtehude
- Matches: 306
- Goals: 1,115 (3.64 per match)
- Top goalscorer: Marcel von Walsleben-Schied (28 goals)
- Biggest home win: FC Süderelbe 10-1 BSV Buxtehude (12 May 2017)
- Biggest away win: FC Süderelbe 0-6 WTSV Concordia (5 August 2016); BSV Buxtehude 0-6 Altona 93 (6 November 2016); Klub Kosova 1-7 Altona 93 (26 February 2017)

The 2016–17 Oberliga Hamburg was the 72nd season of the Oberliga Hamburg, the top football league in the German state of Hamburg, since its establishment in 1945. The season began on 29 July 2016 and concluded on 26 May 2017.

TuS Dassendorf won their 4th consecutive and 5th overall Oberliga Hamburg title. Klub Kosova, TuS Osdorf, and Wedeler TSV were promoted to the Oberliga Hamburg at the end of the 2015-16 season. Kosova was promoted from the Landesliga Hamburg-Hansa, while Osdorf and Wedeler were promoted from the Landesliga Hamburg-Hammonia.

== Teams ==
Locations of the 2016–17 Premier League teams

=== Stadiums and locations ===
Note: Table lists in alphabetical order.

Team	Location	Stadium
Altona 93	Hamburg	Adolf-Jäger-Kampfbahn
Barmbek-Uhlenhorst	Hamburg	BU-Stadion Dieselstraße
Buchholz 08	Buchholz in der Nordheide	Otto-Koch-Kampfbahn
Buxtehude	Buxtehude	Jahnstadion
Concordia	Hamburg	Sportplatz Jenfeld
Condor Hamburg	Hamburg	Sportplatz Berner Heerweg
Curslack-Neuengamme	Hamburg	Sportplatz Gramkowweg
Dassendorf	Dassendorf	Sportplatz Wendelweg
Halstenbek-Rellingen	Halstenbek	Jacob-Thode-Platz
Klub Kosova	Hamburg	Sportplatz Dratelnstraße
Niendorfer	Hamburg	Sportanlage Sachsenweg
Osdorf	Hamburg	Blomkamp
Pinneberg	Pinneberg	Stadion 1 an der Fahltsweide
Rugenbergen	Bönningstedt	Werner-Bornholdt-Sportzentrum
Süderelbe	Hamburg	Sportplatz Kiesbarg
Türkiye	Hamburg	Stadion an der Landesgrenze
Victoria Hamburg	Hamburg	Hoheluft
Wedeler TSV	Wedel	Elbestadion

=== Managers ===
Team	Manager	Kit manufacturer	Shirt sponsor
Altona 93	(Germany) Berkan Algan	Erima	Barthel Armaturen
BSV Buxtehude	(Germany) René Klawon	Adidas	Global Fruit Point
FC Süderelbe	(Germany) Markus Walek	Nike	Jörn Schimkat
FC Türkiye	(Germany) Benjamin Hübbe	Adidas	Onkel Sahingöz
HSV Barmbek-Uhlenhorst	(Germany) Frank Pieper-von Valtier	Puma	Bursped
Klub Kosova	(Germany) Arton Mazrekaj	Adidas	DHL Global Forwarding
Niendorfer TSV	(Iran) Ali Farhadi	Adidas	Stehn & Co.
SC Condor Hamburg	(Germany) Christian Woike	Adidas	Hugo Pfohe
SV Curslack-Neuengamme	(Germany) Torsten Henke	Saller	City-Center Bergedorf
SV Halstenbek-Rellingen	(Germany) Heiko Barthel	Adidas	Hass + Hasje
SV Rugenbergen	(Germany) Ralf Palapies	Adidas	Rehnelt Zeitarbeit
TSV Buchholz 08	(Germany) Thorsten Schneider	Adidas	Betz Holding
TuS Dassendorf	(Germany) Peter Martens	Adidas	My-Bed.eu
TuS Osdorf	(Germany) Peter Wiehle	Nike	Leseberg
VfL Pinneberg	(Germany) Thorben Reibe	Adidas	Maxxis
SC Victoria Hamburg	(Germany) Hamid Derakhshan	Nike	Block House
Wedeler TSV	(Germany) Jörn Großkopf	Hummel	Pentosin
WTSV Concordia	(Germany) Florian Gossow	Adidas	Sporthaus Landwehr

=== Managerial changes ===
Team	Outgoing manager	Manner of departure	Date of vacancy	Position in table	Incoming manager	Date of appointment
FC Süderelbe	(Germany) Jean-Pierre Richter	End of Contract	30 June 2016	Pre-season	(Germany) Olaf Lakämper	1 July 2016
FC Türkiye	(Germany) Matthias Stuhlmacher	End of Contract	30 June 2016	Pre-season	(Turkey) Erhan Albayrak	1 July 2016
Wedeler TSV	(Germany) Heiko Barthel	End of Contract	30 June 2016	Pre-season	(Spain) Daniel Domingo	1 July 2016
BSV Buxtehude	(Germany) Sven Timmermann	Sacked	12 September 2016	18th	(Germany) René Klawon	12 September 2016
FC Türkiye	(Turkey) Erhan Albayrak	Sacked	24 October 2016	6th	(Germany) Thorsten Bettin	25 October 2016
Klub Kosova	(Germany) Thorsten Beyer	Sacked	25 December 2016	16th	(Germany) Arton Mazrekaj	1 January 2017
Wedeler TSV	(Spain) Daniel Domingo	Sacked	12 January 2017	12th	(Germany) Jörn Großkopf	12 January 2017
FC Türkiye	(Germany) Thorsten Bettin	Sacked	8 February 2017	7th	(Germany) Benjamin Hübbe	10 February 2017
FC Süderelbe	(Germany) Olaf Lakämper	Sacked	23 February 2017	16th	(Germany) Markus Walek	23 February 2017
SV Halstenbek-Rellingen	(Germany) Thomas Bliemeister	Sacked	14 March 2017	16th	(Germany) Heiko Barthel	15 March 2017
WSTV Concordia	(Greece) Aki Cholevas	Sacked	17 March 2017	3rd	(Germany) Carsten Richter	17 March 2017
WSTV Concordia	(Germany) Carsten Richter	Interim Period Ended	23 March 2017	3rd	(Germany) Florian Gossow	23 March 2017
Victoria Hamburg	(Bosnia and Herzegovina) Jasmin Bajramovic	Sacked	10 April 2017	6th	(Germany) Jean-Pierre Richter	11 April 2017
Victoria Hamburg	(Germany) Jean-Pierre Richter	Interim Period Ended	30 April 2017	5th	(Germany) Hamid Derakhshan	1 May 2017

== Results ==
=== League table ===
Pos	Team	Pld	W	D	L	GF	GA	GD	Pts	Qualification or relegation
1	TuS Dassendorf (C)	34	23	6	5	79	32	+47	75	
2	TSV Buchholz 08	34	19	9	6	77	44	+33	66	
3	Altona 93	34	18	10	6	72	41	+31	64	Qualification to promotion playoffs
4	Victoria Hamburg	34	18	7	9	82	63	+19	61	
5	WTSV Concordia	34	18	5	11	89	52	+37	59	
6	TuS Osdorf	34	16	10	8	66	53	+13	58	
7	Wedeler TSV	34	17	5	12	77	67	+10	56	
8	SV Rugenbergen	34	14	7	13	67	54	+13	49	
9	VfL Pinneberg	34	14	4	16	62	57	+5	46	
10	SC Condor Hamburg	34	14	4	16	62	72	−10	46	
11	FC Türkiye	34	12	9	13	51	61	−10	45	
12	SV Curslack-Neuengamme	34	13	6	15	44	55	−11	45	
13	HSV Barmbek-Uhlenhorst	34	12	8	14	56	55	+1	44	
14	Niendorfer TSV	34	11	7	16	57	62	−5	40	
15	FC Süderelbe	34	10	6	18	65	78	−13	36	
16	SV Halstenbek-Rellingen (R)	34	8	5	21	37	72	−35	29	Relegation to Landesliga
17	Klub Kosova	34	6	4	24	32	106	−74	22	Relegation to Landesliga
18	BSV Buxtehude (R)	34	3	8	23	40	91	−51	17	Relegation to Landesliga

Source: Welt Fußball
Rules for classification: 1) Points; 2) Goal difference; 3) Goals scored; 4) head-to-head results; 5) goals scored away from home against opponent; 6) goals scored away from home; 7) drawing of lots
(C) Champions; (R) Relegated

=== Results table ===
Home \ Away	ALT	BAR	BUC	BUX	CDA	CDH	CUR	DAS	HAL	KOS	NIE	OSD	PIN	RUG	SUD	TUR	VIC	WED
Altona 93	—	2–0	2–3	1–1	0–0	2–1	2–0	2–2	3–1	2–1	1–1	2–1	3–0	4–3	0–0	1–1	5–1	5–2
HSV Barmbek-Uhlenhorst	3–0	—	1–2	3–0	0–2	3–2	1–1	1–2	3–0	3–0	0–3	1–1	3–0	0–2	2–2	5–0	3–1	2–1
TSV Buchholz 08	1–1	0–0	—	0–0	1–0	2–2	2–1	2–2	3–1	4–0	1–1	2–2	3–2	3–0	3–0	7–0	2–0	5–2
BSV Buxtehude	0–6	1–0	1–2	—	1–3	1–2	0–1	0–2	0–1	5–2	1–4	1–2	1–3	1–1	1–3	0–0	1–3	1–3
WTSV Concordia	3–2	2–1	0–2	6–2	—	1–2	6–0	0–4	5–0	1–1	3–1	4–3	5–0	0–1	5–0	2–2	6–2	3–2
SC Condor Hamburg	1–4	1–1	0–3	2–2	2–4	—	3–1	1–5	3–0	3–0	5–0	0–3	1–0	1–2	1–0	2–2	2–3	4–3
SV Curslack-Neuengamme	2–2	1–0	1–2	3–2	1–0	1–2	—	1–0	1–1	0–0	2–1	0–0	1–3	2–1	4–2	1–2	0–1	2–3
TuS Dassendorf	0–1	3–3	2–0	3–2	2–1	4–2	1–2	—	3–1	7–0	2–1	0–1	4–0	1–0	3–0	2–0	3–1	2–1
SV Halstenbek-Rellingen	0–2	2–2	3–2	1–3	2–1	3–1	1–2	0–2	—	1–1	0–0	2–1	2–1	1–2	2–1	0–2	1–3	1–2
Klub Kosova	1–7	1–5	2–2	3–2	2–1	1–3	2–3	2–1	4–1	—	0–5	0–3	1–4	2–5	0–5	2–0	1–2	2–1
Niendorfer TSV	1–3	3–4	2–3	1–1	2–1	4–0	0–2	0–4	4–1	2–0	—	1–1	2–1	0–0	4–1	3–1	1–2	1–5
TuS Osdorf	2–0	2–1	2–1	2–0	3–3	3–2	2–1	1–1	3–2	6–0	0–3	—	2–0	1–0	4–1	2–2	1–3	1–4
VfL Pinneberg	1–1	4–1	3–1	3–0	0–0	4–1	3–0	0–1	0–2	5–0	1–0	6–1	—	1–1	2–5	1–3	5–1	2–0
SV Rugenbergen	0–1	3–1	4–5	6–2	3–5	1–4	3–0	1–2	5–2	3–0	4–0	2–1	1–1	—	2–1	1–1	1–2	0–2
FC Süderelbe	1–2	5–0	1–4	10–1	0–6	0–1	1–3	1–1	2–1	3–0	3–1	2–2	6–1	0–3	—	2–2	1–4	3–3
FC Türkiye	3–0	4–0	0–0	4–1	2–0	3–0	2–1	2–5	2–1	1–0	3–1	2–3	0–3	1–1	1–2	—	0–3	0–3
Victoria Hamburg	2–2	0–1	3–2	3–3	1–2	3–1	2–2	2–2	0–0	7–1	4–2	3–3	2–1	4–4	7–0	3–1	—	1–2
Wedeler TSV	2–1	2–2	3–2	2–2	5–8	3–4	2–1	0–1	3–0	3–0	2–2	1–1	2–1	2–1	2–1	3–2	1–3	—

Source: Welt Fußball
Legend: Blue = home team win; Yellow = draw; Red = away team win.
For upcoming matches, an "a" indicates there is an article about the rivalry between the two participants.
