= 2010–11 Oberliga Hamburg =

Oberliga Hamburg
- Season: 2010–11
- Champions: FC St. Pauli II
- Promoted: FC St. Pauli II
- Relegated: HSV Barmbek-Uhlenhorst; Wedeler TSV; SC Concordia von 1907; Bramfelder SV
- Matches played: 306
- Goals scored: 985 (3.22 per match)
- Top goalscorer: Arne Gillich (Buchholz, 24 goals)
- Average attendance: 250

The 2010–11 season of the Oberliga Hamburg, the highest association football league in the German state of Hamburg, was the third season of the league at tier five (V) of the German football league system.

== League table ==
The 2010–11 season saw four new clubs in the league, SV Rugenbergen, Germania Schnelsen and Bramfelder SV, all promoted from the Landesligas while FC St. Pauli II had been relegated from the Regionalliga Nord to the league.

	Team	Pld	W	D	L	G	GD	Pts
1.	FC St. Pauli II (A)	34	26	5	3	103:36	+67	83
2.	TSV Buchholz 08	34	21	5	8	56:33	+23	68
3.	SV Curslack-Neuengamme	34	19	5	10	55:43	+12	62
4.	SC Condor Hamburg	34	16	9	9	55:43	+12	57
5.	Altonaer FC von 1893	34	15	9	10	63:46	+17	54
6.	FC Eintracht Norderstedt 03	34	13	13	8	55:44	+11	52
7.	ASV Bergedorf 85	34	15	7	12	67:69	−2	52
8.	Meiendorfer SV	34	15	6	13	55:48	+7	51
9.	SC Victoria Hamburg	34	14	8	12	58:51	+7	50
10.	TuS Germania Schnelsen (N)	34	13	6	15	55:47	+8	45
11.	SV Rugenbergen (N)	34	12	9	13	46:47	−1	45
12.	Niendorfer TSV	34	10	10	14	55:63	−8	40
13.	Oststeinbeker SV	34	11	6	17	59:67	−8	39
14.	USC Paloma Hamburg	34	7	11	16	39:57	−18	32
15.	HSV Barmbek-Uhlenhorst	34	9	5	20	46:68	−22	32
16.	Wedeler TSV	34	8	8	18	43:71	−28	32
17.	SC Concordia von 1907	34	8	7	19	37:71	−34	31
18.	Bramfelder SV (N)	34	5	9	20	41:84	−43	24

	Promoted to 2011–12 Regionalliga
	Relegated to 2011–12 Landesliga
(A)	Relegated from 2009–10 Regionalliga
(N)	Promoted from 2009–10 Landesliga

== Results ==
2010–11		PAU	B08	CUS	COD	AFC	NOR	ASV	MSV	VIC	SCH	SVR	NIE	OSV	PAL	BAR	WED	COC	BSV
1.	FC St. Pauli II		6–1	0–1	2–3	3–1	3–1	4–0	1–0	0–2	3–0	3–0	4–0	5–2	5–0	3–2	5–0	5–1	6–0
2.	TSV Buchholz 08	0–2		0–1	2–1	3–1	0–0	4–2	4–1	2–1	1–0	2–0	1–2	2–0	3–0	2–0	3–2	1–2	1–1
3.	SV Curslack-Neuengamme	0–3	1–3		3–2	3–1	0–2	1–3	3–2	2–1	3–2	2–0	2–0	3–1	3–3	5–1	2–1	3–0	1–1
4.	SC Condor Hamburg	0–2	1–3	3–0		1–1	0–0	0–0	2–2	1–0	1–1	0–0	3–0	2–1	1–1	2–2	4–0	1–2	3–2
5.	Altonaer FC von 1893	1–1	0–1	1–0	5–4		1–3	4–0	1–1	1–1	1–0	0–0	3–2	3–0	4–3	2–1	1–1	1–0	1–1
6.	FC Eintracht Norderstedt 03	1–2	2–4	1–1	0–2	0–0		4–0	1–1	1–1	1–0	0–0	3–2	3–0	4–3	2–1	1–1	1–0	1–1
7.	ASV Bergedorf 85	2–2	1–1	1–4	4–2	5–2	2–0		2–2	1–2	0–1	0–0	9–3	4–2	2–1	5–1	2–1	1–0	4–2
8.	Meiendorfer SV	1–2	1–0	3–1	1–3	1–0	2–0	2–3		3–0	0–1	1–2	0–3	0–3	3–1	4–2	3–0	1–0	2–3
9.	SC Victoria Hamburg	4–5	1–0	2–2	1–2	1–1	1–5	3–1	0–2		1–1	2–2	2–0	3–0	1–0	1–2	4–2	3–1	3–2
10.	TuS Germania Schnelsen	1–2	0–0	1–2	0–1	3–2	2–2	6–0	2–1	0–1		2–1	2–0	2–1	4–1	5–2	3–3	3–1	5–0
11.	SV Rugenbergen	3–5	2–1	0–2	0–1	1–1	0–2	2–2	2–2	1–2	1–0		2–0	0–2	2–2	1–0	2–0	3–1	1–2
12.	Niendorfer TSV	3–3	0–0	2–0	0–1	1–1	2–2	0–1	0–2	3–3	2–1	0–2		2–2	0–4	6–1	2–2	5–1	4–0
13.	Oststeinbeker SV	2–5	0–1	1–2	2–3	0–4	5–2	3–1	1–1	3–2	2–1	3–2	3–3		3–0	1–1	1–2	5–1	3–1
14.	USC Paloma Hamburg	1–1	1–3	2–0	2–0	2–2	0–2	4–1	0–3	0–0	0–0	0–1	2–1	1–1		0–0	3–0	0–0	1–1
15.	HSV Barmbek-Uhlenhorst	2–3	1–2	1–0	2–0	1–2	1–1	0–1	1–3	3–2	4–1	1–3	1–4	0–0	3–1		3–0	2–1	3–0
16.	Wedeler TSV	1–1	0–3	0–1	0–1	0–4	4–1	5–1	0–0	0–2	3–1	2–4	1–1	1–3	1–0	1–0		1–3	4–3
17.	SC Concordia von 1907	0–4	0–1	0–0	1–1	2–3	1–1	0–5	1–2	0–5	0–2	1–1	0–0	3–2	3–1	2–1	1–2		2–1
18.	Bramfelder SV	0–2	0–2	0–1	1–3	1–1	1–5	1–1	1–2	1–1	2–1	0–4	2–3	2–1	0–1	2–1	3–3	3–3	
