= Christopher Braun =

Ghanaian-born German footballer

Personal information
- Date of birth: 15 July 1991 (age 35)
- Place of birth: Hamburg, Germany
- Height: 1.81 m (5 ft 11 in)
- Position: Right-back

Team information
- Current team: CFR Cluj
- Number: 47

Youth career
- –2008: Hamburger SV
- 2008: VfL 93 Hamburg
- 2009–2010: FC St. Pauli

Senior career*
Years	Team	Apps	(Gls)
2010–2013	FC St. Pauli II	61	(1)
2013–2014	SV Wilhelmshaven	33	(2)
2014–2015	VfB Oldenburg	30	(1)
2015–2016	SG Wattenscheid 09	34	(1)
2016–2018	Fortuna Sittard	63	(1)
2019–2020	OFI	41	(0)
2020–2022	Botoșani	61	(1)
2022–2023	CFR Cluj	30	(1)
2023–2026	Rapid București	75	(2)
2026–	CFR Cluj	26	(0)
- * Club domestic league appearances and goals as of 31 October 2026

Christopher Braun (born 15 July 1991) is a German professional footballer who plays as a right back for Liga I club CFR Cluj.

== Career ==
Born in Hamburg, Braun played in his youth for Hamburger SV, VfL 93 Hamburg and FC St. Pauli. He progressed to senior football with FC St. Pauli's second team in March 2011, helping the team gain promotion to the Regionalliga Nord for the 2011–12 season and remaining with them for two seasons. He then spent one season each with league rivals SV Wilhelmshaven and VfB Oldenburg.

In 2015, he left northern Germany for the first time, joining SG Wattenscheid 09 in the Regionalliga West. After one season, he moved to the Dutch second-division club Fortuna Sittard. He helped the team achieve promotion to the Eredivisie in the 2017–18 season but subsequently lost his regular place and left the club during the winter break of the 2018–19 season. He then joined the Greek first-division club OFI Crete, helping them secure their top-flight status in the relegation play-offs against AO Platanias in May 2019.

After a short spell without a club, he joined Romanian first-division side FC Botoșani in October 2020, signing a two-year contract. In the summer of 2022, reigning champions CFR Cluj signed him, and the club finished third in the league at the end of the season. After one year, he moved to league rivals Rapid Bucureşti in the summer of 2023.

== Career statistics ==
=== Club ===
As of match played 31 October 2026

Appearances and goals by club, season and competition
Club	Season	League			National cup (Note: Includes DFB-Pokal, Niedersächsischer Pokal, Westfalenpokal, KNVB Beker, Greek Cup, Cupa României)		Europe		Other		Total	
Club	Season	Division	Apps	Goals	Apps	Goals	Apps	Goals	Apps	Goals	Apps	Goals
FC St. Pauli II	2010–11	Oberliga Hamburg	13	0	—		—		—		13	0
FC St. Pauli II	2011–12	Regionalliga Nord	30	0	—		—		—		30	0
FC St. Pauli II	2012–13	Regionalliga Nord	18	1	—		—		—		18	1
FC St. Pauli II	Total		61	1	—		—		—		61	1
SV Wilhelmshaven	2013–14	Regionalliga Nord	33	2	3 (Note: One appearance in DFB-Pokal, two appearances in Niedersächsischer Pokal)	0	—		—		36	2
VfB Oldenburg	2014–15	Regionalliga Nord	30	1	4	0	—		—		34	1
SG Wattenscheid 09	2015–26	Regionalliga West	34	1	5	0	—		—		39	1
Fortuna Sittard	2016–17	Eerste Divisie	35	1	1	0	—		—		36	1
Fortuna Sittard	2017–18	Eerste Divisie	28	0	3	0	—		—		31	0
Fortuna Sittard	2018–19	Eredivisie	0	0	0	0	—		—		31	0
Fortuna Sittard	Total		63	1	4	0	—		—		67	1
OFI	2018–19	Super League Greece	13	0	1	0	—		2 (Note: Appearances in Super League Greece relegation play-offs)	0	16	0
OFI	2019–20	Super League Greece	28	0	4	0	—		—		32	0
OFI	Total		41	0	5	0	—		2	0	48	0
Botoșani	2020–21	Liga I	24	0	2	0	—		—		26	0
Botoșani	2021–22	Liga I	37	1	1	0	—		1 (Note: Appearance in Liga I play-offs for UEFA Europa Conference League)	0	39	1
Botoșani	Total		61	1	3	0	—		1	0	65	1
CFR Cluj	2022–23	Liga I	30	1	4	0	9 (Note: Appearances in UEFA Conference League)	0	1 (Note: Appearance in Supercupa României)	0	44	1
Rapid București	2023–24	Liga I	36	0	1	0	—		—		37	0
Rapid București	2024–25	Liga I	24	2	1	0	—		—		25	2
Rapid București	2025–26	Liga I	15	0	1	0	—		—		16	0
Rapid București	Total		75	2	3	0	—		—		78	2
CFR Cluj	2025–26	Liga I	13	0	0	0	—		—		13	0
CFR Cluj	2026–27	Liga I	13	0	1	0	4	0	—		18	0
CFR Cluj	Total		26	0	1	0	4	0	—		31	0
Career total			454	10	32	0	13	0	4	0	503	10

== Honours ==
FC St. Pauli II

- Oberliga Hamburg: 2010–11

SG Wattenscheid 09

- Westfalenpokal: 2015–16

CFR Cluj

- Supercupa României runner-up: 2022
