= Oberliga Hamburg/Schleswig-Holstein =

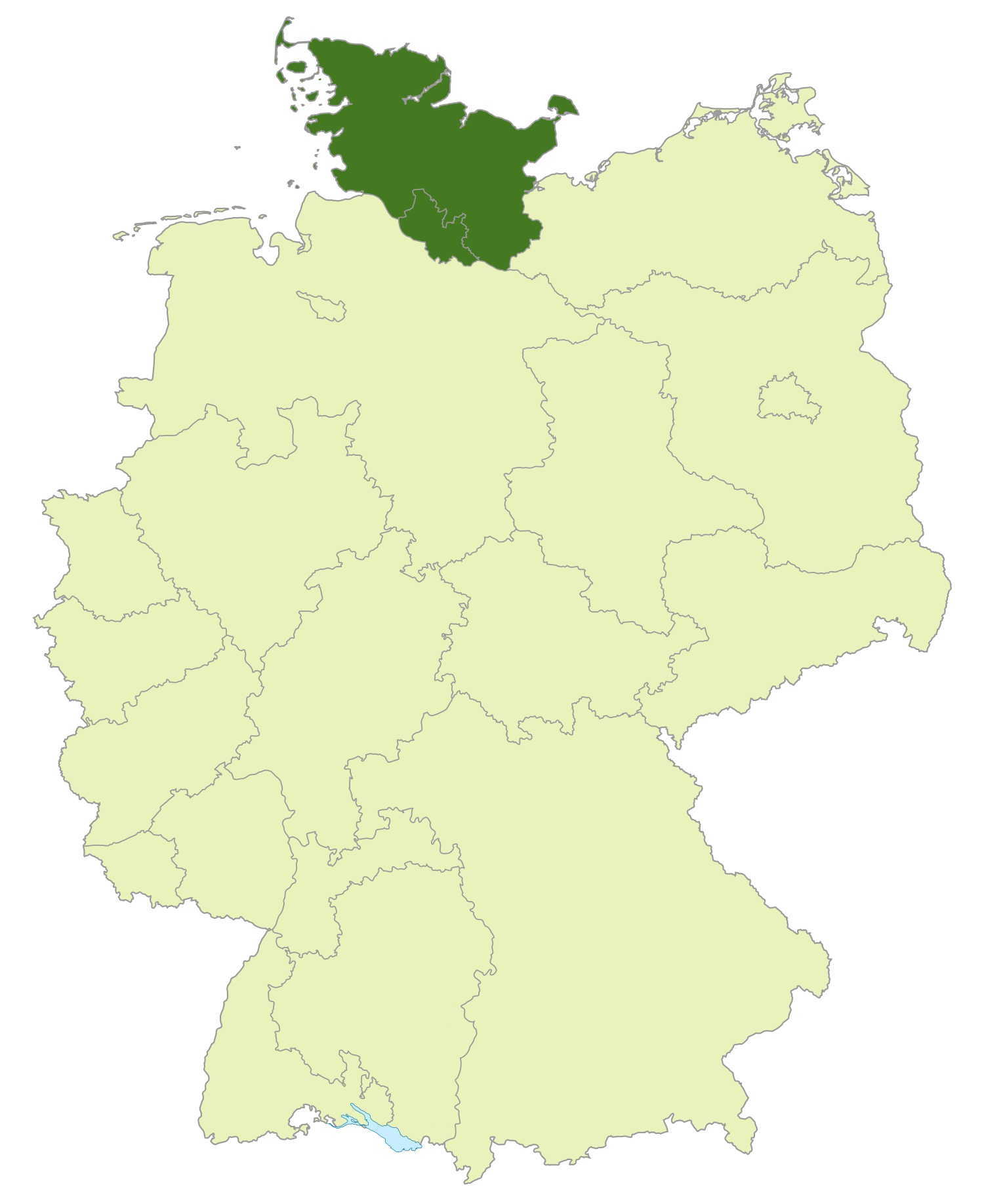
- Founded: 1994
- Folded: 2004 (10 seasons)
- Replaced by: Oberliga Nord
- Country: Germany
- States: Schleswig-Holstein; Hamburg
- Level on pyramid: Level 4
- Promotion to: Regionalliga Nord
- Relegation to: Verbandsliga Hamburg; Verbandsliga Schleswig-Holstein
- Last champions: Holstein Kiel II (2003–04)

The Oberliga Hamburg/Schleswig-Holstein was the fourth tier of the German football league system in the north of Germany, existing from 1994 to 2004. It covered the states of Hamburg and Schleswig-Holstein. With the re-formation of the Oberliga Nord in 2004, the league was disbanded.

== Overview ==
The Oberliga Hamburg/Schleswig-Holstein started out in 1994 as a replacement for the Oberliga Nord, which was disbanded in that year. Along with this league, the Oberliga Niedersachsen/Bremen was formed to cover the other two of the four states the Oberliga Nord previously had served. The reason for the disbanding of the Oberliga Nord and the creation of two separate leagues in its stead was the formation of the Regionalliga Nord, which became the new third tier of league football in the north and covered exactly the same region as the Oberliga previously.

The league was formed from sixteen clubs, with eight of them coming from the Verbandsliga Schleswig-Holstein, seven from the Verbandsliga Hamburg and one from the Oberliga Nord.

For the duration of the league's existence, it was fed by the two Verbandsligas of Hamburg and Schleswig-Holstein with the winners of these leagues gaining direct promotion to the Oberliga.

The winner of the Oberliga was directly promoted to the Regionalliga from 1995 to 1999. In 2000, no promotion was available due to changes in the league system. From 2001 to 2004, the league champion had to play-off for promotion with the winner of the Oberliga Niedersachsen/Bremen. The first three years, the winner of this league won this contest, only in 2004 gained the Oberliga Niedersachsen/Bremen champion the upper hand.

In 2000, with the reduction of the number of Regionalligas to two, eight clubs were relegated from this league to the Oberligas and the league expanded to eighteen teams. The Regionalliga Nord now covered the complete northern half of Germany, not just the traditional region of the Oberliga Nord.

On these grounds it was decided in 2004 to reform a united Oberliga Nord which allowed direct promotion to its champion to the Regionalliga. The Oberliga Hamburg/Schleswig-Holstein was therefore disbanded. The clubs placed first to eighth were admitted to the new Oberliga. The other ten clubs in the league were relegated to the Verbandsligas.

In 2008, with the introduction of the new 3. Liga, the Oberliga Nord was disbanded again. The Oberligas Niedersachsen/Bremen and Hamburg/Schleswig-Holstein however were not reformed. Below the Regionalliga Nord the five Verbandsligas in the north functioned as the next level of play, making it the only region, until 2012, without an Oberliga and without direct promotion to the Regionalliga.

== League champions ==
The league champions:

Season	Club
1994–95	FC St. Pauli II
1995–96	FC Altona 93
1996–97	VfL 93 Hamburg
1997–98	Holstein Kiel
1998–99	FC St. Pauli II
1999–2000	TuS Felde
2000–01	Holstein Kiel
2001–02	Hamburger SV II
2002–03	FC St. Pauli II
2003–04	Holstein Kiel II

- The FC St. Pauli II was ineligible for promotion in 2003 as their first team was relegated to the Regionalliga. VfR Neumünster, the runners-up, was promoted instead.

== Placings in the league from 1994 to 2004 ==
The complete list of clubs in the league and their final placings:

Club	1995	1996	1997	1998	1999	2000	2001	2002	2003	2004
Holstein Kiel	R	R	6	1	R	R	1	R	R	R
Hamburger SV II	R	R	R	R	R	R	3	1	R	R
VfR Neumünster		12	10	10	14		9	6	2	R
Holstein Kiel II	12	13							15	1
FC Altona 93 ^{1}	3	1	R						8	2
Concordia Hamburg	R	R	R	5	6	16		5	3	3
Meiendorfer SV		15							6	4
FC St. Pauli II	1	R	R	3	1	R	5	2	1	5
ASV Bergedorf 85	11	14		16				4	4	6
Eider Büdelsdorf										7
SC Victoria Hamburg		16								8
VfL Pinneberg	9	4	7	11	7	5	12	7	9	9
Husumer SV								9	10	10
SV Lurup	R	R	R	12	8	13	16	12	5	11
TSV Sasel										12
TSV Kropp										13
SpVgg Flensburg 08	14							18	11	14
SC Vorwärts Billstedt				14	9	10	7	8	14	15
Raspo Elmshorn			12		12	2	8	14	7	16
Wedeler TSV										17
Heider SV	4	3	2	9	11	12	13	11	13	18
TSV Altenholz ^{6}				6	13	3	10	15	12	
Eimsbütteler TV						14	17	17	16	
TSB Flensburg	15		16						17	
1. SC Norderstedt ^{5}	2	R	R	R	R	R	4	3		
Eichholzer SV ^{5}						7	11	10		
FC Kilia Kiel								13		
TSV Lägersdorf ^{5}						8	15	16		
TuS Hoisdorf ^{4}	R	5	5	2	3	4	2			
TuS Felde ^{4}					4	1	6			
TuS Dassendorf						9	14			
Harburger TB	7	9	11	13	10	11	18			
TSV Pansdorf ^{3}	10	2	4	4	2	6				
Itzehoer SV	13	8	8	8	5	15				
SV Halstenbeck-Rellingen	8	6	9	7	15					
Phönix Lübeck	5	10	14		16					
VfL 93 Hamburg ^{2}	R	R	1	R						
TSV Nord Harrislee		7	3	15						
Barsbütteler SV	6	11	13							
SC Condor Hamburg			15							
SV Sereetz	16									

- ^{1} FC Altona 93 withdrew its team to the Verbandsliga in 1997.
- ^{2} VfL 93 Hamburg withdrew its team to the Verbandsliga in 1998.
- ^{3} TSV Pansdorf withdrew its team from the league in 2000.
- ^{4} TuS Hoisdorf and TuS Felde withdrew their teams from the league in 2001.
- ^{5} 1. SC Norderstedt, Eichholzer SV and TSV Lägersdorf withdrew their teams from the league in 2002.
- ^{6} TSV Altenholz withdrew its team from the league in 2003.

=== Key ===
Symbol	Key
B	Bundesliga (1963–present)
2B	2. Bundesliga (1974–present)
R	Regionalliga Nord (1994–present)
1	League champions
Place	League
Blank	Played at a league level below this league

== Founding members of the league ==
The league was formed from sixteen clubs from two states in 1994, those being:

From the Oberliga Nord:

- 1. SC Norderstedt

From the Verbandsliga Hamburg:

- ASV Bergedorf
- FC St. Pauli II
- VfL Pinneberg
- Barsbütteler SV
- Harburger TB
- FC Altona 93
- SV Halstenbek-Rellingen

From the Verbandsliga Schleswig-Holstein:

- Holstein Kiel II
- Heider SV
- SV Sereetz
- TSV Pansdorf
- 1. FC Phönix Lübeck
- Itzehoer SV
- TSB Flensburg
- SpVgg Flensburg 08

== Disbanding of the league ==
The league was disbanded in 2004 and replaced by the Oberliga Nord. Its clubs were spread between the Oberliga Nord and the two Verbandsligas:

To the Oberliga Nord:

- Holstein Kiel II
- FC Altona 93
- Concordia Hamburg
- Meiendorfer SV
- FC St. Pauli II
- ASV Bergedorf 85
- FT Eider Büdelsdorf
- SC Victoria Hamburg

To the Verbandsliga Hamburg:

- SV Lurup
- VfL Pinneberg
- TSV Sasel
- Vorwärts/Wacker Billstedt
- Rasensport Elmshorn
- Wedeler TSV

To the Verbandsliga Schleswig-Holstein:

- Husumer SV
- TSV Kropp
- SpVgg Flensburg 08
- Heider SV
