= 2014–15 Verbandspokal =

Tournament details
- Country: Germany

Final positions
- Champions: 21 regional winners

The 2014–15 Verbandspokal (English: 2014–15 Association Cup), consisting of twenty-one regional cup competitions, the Verbandspokale, is the qualifying competition for the 2015–16 DFB-Pokal, the German Cup.

All clubs from the 3. Liga and below could enter the regional Verbandspokale, subject to the rules and regulations of each region. Clubs from the Bundesliga and 2. Bundesliga could not enter but were instead directly qualified for the first round of the DFB-Pokal. Reserve teams are not permitted to take part in the DFB-Pokal or the Verbandspokale. The precise rules of each regional Verbandspokal are laid down by the regional football association organising it.

All twenty-one winners were qualified for the first round of the German Cup in the following season. Three additional clubs were also qualified for the first round of the German Cup, these being from the three largest state associations, Bavaria, Westphalia and Lower Saxony. The qualified team was the runners-up of the Lower Saxony Cup while, in Bavaria and Westphalia, the best-placed Regionalliga Bayern and Oberliga Westfalen non-reserve team qualified for DFB-Pokal.

Of the twenty-two teams qualified for the DFB-Pokal through the Verbandspokale, eighteen were knocked out in the first round. Three clubs, SSV Reutlingen, FC Carl Zeiss Jena and FC Viktoria Köln, were knocked out in the second round while SpVgg Unterhaching was the only one of the twenty-two to advance to the third, where it lost to Bayer Leverkusen. Jena and Unterhaching eliminated one Bundesliga club each in the first round, Hamburger SV and FC Ingolstadt 04 while the others advanced though defeating 2. Bundesliga clubs.

== Finals ==
The 2014–15 Verbandspokal finals with the winners qualified for the 2015–16 DFB-Pokal:

Verbandspokal	Date	Location	Home	Away	Result	Attendance	Report
Bavarian Cup (2014–15 season)	20 May 2015	Weiden	SpVgg SV Weiden	**SpVgg Unterhaching**	2–2 (5–6 pen)	2,200	Report
Berlin Cup	20 May 2015	Berlin	**BFC Dynamo**	SV Tasmania Berlin	1–0	6,914	Report
Brandenburg Cup	6 May 2015	Fürstenwalde	Union Fürstenwalde	**Energie Cottbus**	2–3	3,424	Report
Bremen Cup	25 May 2015	Bremen	Brinkumer SV	**Bremer SV**	1–5		Report
Hamburg Cup	25 May 2015	Hamburg	**HSV Barmbeck-Uhlenhorst**	Condor Hamburg	2–0		Report
Hesse Cup	13 May 2015	Kassel	**KSV Hessen Kassel**	VfB Gießen	2–1	6,100	Report
Lower Rhine Cup	14 May 2015	Essen	**Rot-Weiss Essen**	Rot-Weiß Oberhausen	0–0 aet (6–5 pen)	18,500	Report
Lower Saxony Cup	13 May 2015	Meppen	SV Meppen^{¶}	**VfL Osnabrück**	0–0 (4–5 pen)		Report
Mecklenburg-Vorpommern Cup	13 May 2015	Greifswald	TSG Neustrelitz	**F.C. Hansa Rostock**	0–1	4,500	Report
Middle Rhine Cup	14 May 2015	Bonn	Bonner SC	**FC Viktoria Köln**	1–4	6,193	Report
North Baden Cup	20 May 2015	Langensteinbach	**FC Nöttingen**	SV Spielberg	3–2	3,421	Report
Rhineland Cup	3 June 2015	Polch	SpVgg Burgbrohl	**FSV Salmrohr**	1–1 (3–5 pen)	2,081	Report
Saarland Cup	13 May 2015	Rehlingen	**SV Elversberg**	FC Homburg	2–1 aet	4,000	Report
Saxony Cup	13 May 2015	Zwickau	FSV Zwickau	**Chemnitzer FC**	0–2	3,615	Report
Saxony-Anhalt Cup	13 May 2015	Halle	VfL Halle 96	**Hallescher FC**	0–6	12,855	Report
Schleswig-Holstein Cup	15 July 2015	Lübeck	**VfB Lübeck**^{‡}	Holstein Kiel	1–0		Report
South Baden Cup	20 May 2015	Emmendingen	Freiburger FC	**Bahlinger SC**	0–3	3,500	Report
South West Cup	13 May 2015	Offenbach	**FK Pirmasens**	FV Dudenhofen	1–0 aet	2,500	Report
Thuringia Cup	13 May 2015	Meuselwitz	ZFC Meuselwitz	**FC Carl Zeiss Jena**	1–2 aet	3,871	Report
Westphalia Cup	14 May 2015	Verl	SC Verl	**Sportfreunde Lotte**	0–0 aet (3–4 pen)	1,600	Report
Württemberg Cup	6 May 2015	Stuttgart	**SSV Reutlingen**	FV Ravensburg	2–1	3,658	Report

- Winners in **bold**.
- ^{¶}The three largest regional associations were allowed to send an additional team. In Lower Saxony this was the losing finalist of the cup. In Bavaria and Westphalia this place went to the best non-reserve team of the Regionalliga Bayern, Würzburger Kickers, and the Oberliga Westfalen, TuS Erndtebrück.
- ^{‡} As Holstein Kiel was already qualified for the DFB-Pokal through its 3. Liga place VfB Lübeck was qualified regardless of the outcome of the final.

=== Clubs by league ===
The clubs qualified for the 2015–16 DFB-Pokal by league:

League	Level	Clubs
3. Liga	3	VfL Osnabrück, FC Energie Cottbus, F.C. Hansa Rostock, Chemnitzer FC, Hallescher FC, SpVgg Unterhaching
Regionalliga Nord	4	SV Meppen, VfB Lübeck
Regionalliga Nordost	4	FC Carl Zeiss Jena, BFC Dynamo
Regionalliga Südwest	4	KSV Hessen Kassel, SV Elversberg, FK Pirmasens, FC Nöttingen
Regionalliga West	4	Rot-Weiß Essen, FC Viktoria Köln, Sportfreunde Lotte
Oberliga Baden-Württemberg	5	SSV Reutlingen, Bahlinger SC
Oberliga Hamburg	5	HSV Barmbeck-Uhlenhorst
Bremen-Liga	5	Bremer SV
Oberliga Rheinland-Pfalz/Saar	5	FSV Salmrohr

- Clubs who qualified as runners-up in italics
