= 2013–14 Verbandspokal =

Tournament details
- Country: Germany

Final positions
- Champions: 21 regional winners

The 2013–14 Verbandspokal, (English: 2013–14 Association Cup) consisting of twenty one regional cup competitions, the Verbandspokale, was the qualifying competition for the 2014–15 DFB-Pokal, the German Cup.

All clubs from the 3. Liga and below could enter the regional Verbandspokale, subject to the rules and regulations of each region. Clubs from the Bundesliga and 2. Bundesliga could not enter but were instead directly qualified for the first round of the DFB-Pokal.

All twenty one winners and three additional clubs from the three largest regional football associations, Bavaria, Lower Saxony and Westphalia, were qualified for the first round of the German Cup in the following season. The three additional clubs were the runners-up of the Lower Saxony Cup and the Westphalia Cup while, in Bavaria, the best-placed Regionalliga Bayern non-reserve team qualified as reserve teams are banned from the DFB-Pokal. The Württemberg Cup winner 1. FC Heidenheim was already qualified for the DFB-Pokal through its 3. Liga place and runners-up Stuttgarter Kickers received their spot instead. Of those twenty three clubs qualified through the Verbandspokale seventeen were knocked out in the first round while Chemnitzer FC, MSV Duisburg, Würzburger Kickers, Arminia Bielefeld and 1. FC Magdeburg were knocked out in the second round. Kickers Offenbach, the Hesse Cup winner and 1970 DFB-Pokal champions, was the only one of the twenty three clubs to advance to the third round, where they lost to Borussia Mönchengladbach.

== Finals ==
The 2013–14 Verbandspokal finals with the winners qualified for the 2014–15 DFB-Pokal:.

| Verbandspokal | Date | Location | Winner | Finalist | Result | Attendance | Report |
|---|---|---|---|---|---|---|---|
| Bavarian Cup (2013–14 season) | 14 May 2014 | Passau | Würzburger Kickers | SV Schalding-Heining^{¶} | 2-2 (4-2 pen) | 2,070 | Report |
| Berlin Cup | 4 June 2014 | Berlin | FC Viktoria 1889 Berlin | SV Tasmania Berlin | 2-1 | 3,468 | Report |
| Brandenburg Cup | 28 May 2014 | Rathenow | FSV Optik Rathenow | SV Babelsberg 03 | 3-1 | 1,695 | Report |
| Bremen Cup | 25 May 2014 | Bremen | Bremer SV | Blumenthaler SV | 1-0 | | Report |
| Hamburg Cup | 29 May 2014 | Hamburg | USC Paloma | Condor Hamburg | 0–0 aet (3-2 pen) | 4,317 | Report |
| Hesse Cup | 19 June 2014 | Offenbach | Kickers Offenbach | SV Darmstadt 98 | 1–1 (3-1 pen) | 4,590 | Report |
| Lower Rhine Cup | 15 May 2014 | Duisburg | MSV Duisburg | TV Jahn Hiesfeld | 5-2 | 24,002 | Report |
| Lower Saxony Cup | 23 July 2014 | Braunschweig | BSV Schwarz-Weiß Rehden | FT Braunschweig^{¶} | 2-1 | | Report |
| Mecklenburg-Vorpommern Cup | 30 April 2014 | Malchow | 1. FC Neubrandenburg | Sievershäger SV | 4-0 | 1,500 | Report |
| Middle Rhine Cup | 28 May 2014 | Bonn | FC Viktoria Köln | FC Wegberg-Beeck | 2-1 | 1,100 | Report |
| North Baden Cup | 20 May 2014 | Waghäusel | FC Astoria Walldorf | FC Nöttingen | 1–0 | | Report |
| Rhineland Cup | 28 May 2014 | Trier | Eintracht Trier | SG Altenkirchen | 3-0 | 1,490 | Report |
| Saarland Cup | 7 May 2014 | Völklingen | FC 08 Homburg | SV Elversberg | 2-0 | | Report |
| Saxony Cup | 7 May 2014 | Neugersdorf | Chemnitzer FC | FC Oberlausitz Neugersdorf | 3-2 aet | 3,219 | Report |
| Saxony-Anhalt Cup | 14 May 2014 | Halle | 1. FC Magdeburg | Hallescher FC | 3-0 aet | 11,987 | Report |
| Schleswig-Holstein Cup | 16 May 2014 | Kiel | Holstein Kiel | ETSV Weiche Flensburg | 1–1 aet (12-11 pen) | 5,790 | Report |
| South Baden Cup | 14 May 2014 | Freiburg | SV Waldkirch | FC Bötzingen | 4–0 | 3,050 | Report |
| South West Cup | 14 May 2014 | Mehlingen | Alemannia Waldalgesheim | SVN Zweibrücken | 1-0 | 1,005 | Report |
| Thuringia Cup | 14 May 2014 | Jena | FC Carl Zeiss Jena | Rot-Weiß Erfurt | 5-0 | 10,000 | Report |
| Westphalia Cup | 15 July 2014 | Siegen | Preußen Münster | Sportfreunde Siegen^{¶} | 3-1 | | Report |
| Württemberg Cup | 7 May 2014 | Aspach | 1. FC Heidenheim | Stuttgarter Kickers^{‡} | 4–2 | 2,500 | Report |

- ^{¶}The three largest regional associations were allowed to send an additional team. In Westphalia and Lower Saxony this was the losing finalist of the cup. In Bavaria this place went to the best non-reserve team of the Regionalliga Bayern, the FV Illertissen.
- ^{‡} The Württemberg Cup champion 1. FC Heidenheim was already qualified for the DFB-Pokal through its 3. Liga place, runners-up Stuttgarter Kickers qualified instead.

=== Clubs by league ===
The 2013–14 winners and DFB-Pokal qualified runners-up by league:

| League | Level | Clubs |
|---|---|---|
| 3. Liga | 3 | Stuttgarter Kickers, MSV Duisburg, Chemnitzer FC, Preußen Münster, Holstein Kiel |
| Regionalliga Bayern | 4 | Würzburger Kickers |
| Regionalliga Nord | 4 | BSV Schwarz-Weiß Rehden |
| Regionalliga Nordost | 4 | 1. FC Magdeburg, FC Carl Zeiss Jena, BFC Viktoria 1889, FSV Optik Rathenow |
| Regionalliga West | 4 | FC Viktoria Köln, Sportfreunde Siegen |
| Regionalliga Südwest | 4 | Kickers Offenbach, Eintracht Trier, FC 08 Homburg |
| Bremen-Liga | 5 | Bremer SV |
| NOFV-Oberliga Nord | 5 | 1. FC Neubrandenburg |
| Niedersachsenliga | 5 | FT Braunschweig |
| Oberliga Baden-Württemberg | 5 | FC Astoria Walldorf |
| Oberliga Rheinland-Pfalz/Saar | 5 | SV Alemannia Waldalgesheim |
| Landesliga Hamburg-Hammonia | 6 | USC Paloma |
| Verbandsliga Südbaden | 6 | SV Waldkirch |

- Clubs who qualified as runners-up in italics
