= 2017–18 Verbandspokal =

Tournament details
- Country: Germany
- Teams: 42

The 2017–18 Verbandspokal, (English: 2017–18 Association Cup) consisted of twenty one regional cup competitions, the Verbandspokale, the qualifying competition for the 2018–19 DFB-Pokal, the German Cup.

All clubs from the 3. Liga and below could enter the regional Verbandspokale, subject to the rules and regulations of each region. Clubs from the Bundesliga and 2. Bundesliga could not enter but were instead directly qualified for the first round of the DFB-Pokal. Reserve teams were not permitted to take part in the DFB-Pokal or the Verbandspokale. The precise rules of each regional Verbandspokal are laid down by the regional football association organising it.

All twenty one winners qualified for the first round of the German Cup in the following season. Three additional clubs are also qualified for the first round of the German Cup, these being from the three largest state associations, Bavaria, Westphalia and Lower Saxony. The qualified teams were the runners-up of the Lower Saxony Cup. In Bavaria the best-placed Regionalliga Bayern non-reserve team was qualified for DFB-Pokal while in Westphalia a play-off was conducted to determine this club.

On 6 October 2017, it was announced that German broadcaster ARD would show all 21 Verbandspokal finals live in a conference as well as live stream them and that all finals would be played on the same date, 21 May 2018.

== Competitions ==
The finals of the 2017–18 Verbandspokal competitions (winners listed in bold):

Cup	Date	Location	Team 1	Result	Team 2	Attendance	Report
Baden Cup (2017–18 season)	21 May 2018	Nöttingen	1. CfR Pforzheim	1–1 (a.e.t.) (4–5 p)	**Karlsruher SC**		Report
Bavarian Cup (Note: As one of the three largest regional associations, Bavaria gets an additional DFB-Pokal berth, which goes to the best non-reserve team of the Regionalliga Bayern.) (2017–18 season)	21 May 2018	Bayreuth	SpVgg Bayreuth	1–3	**1. FC Schweinfurt 05**	3,762	Report
Berlin Cup (2017–18 season)	21 May 2018	Berlin	**BFC Dynamo**	2–1	Berliner SC		Report
Brandenburg Cup (2017–18 season)	21 May 2018	Potsdam	Babelsberg 03	0–1	**Energie Cottbus**	9,012	Report
Bremen Cup (2017–18 season)	21 May 2018	Bremen	Blumenthaler SV	0–3	**BSC Hastedt**		Report
Hamburg Cup (2017–18 season)	21 May 2018	Hamburg	Niendorfer TSV	0–2	**TuS Dassendorf**		Report
Hessian Cup (2017–18 season)	21 May 2018	Stadtallendorf	**TSV Steinbach**	2–0	Hessen Kassel		Report
Lower Rhine Cup (2017–18 season)	21 May 2018	Oberhausen	**Rot-Weiß Oberhausen**	2–1	Rot-Weiss Essen	15,000	Report
Lower Saxony Cup (Note: As one of the three largest regional associations, Lower Saxony gets an additional DFB-Pokal berth, which goes to the losing cup finalist.) (2017–18 season)	21 May 2018	Drochtersen	**SV Drochtersen/Assel**	5–1	SSV Jeddeloh		Report
Mecklenburg-Vorpommern Cup (2017–18 season)	21 May 2018	Neustrelitz	FC Mecklenburg Schwerin	1–2	**Hansa Rostock**	3,300	Report
Middle Rhine Cup (2017–18 season)	21 May 2018	Bonn	Alemannia Aachen	0–2 (a.e.t.)	**Viktoria Köln**	5,478	Report
Rhineland Cup (2017–18 season)	21 May 2018	Koblenz	TuS Koblenz	0–1	**Rot-Weiss Koblenz**		Report
Saarland Cup (2017–18 season)	21 May 2018	Spiesen-Elversberg	**SV Elversberg**	1–0	1. FC Saarbrücken		Report
Saxony Cup (2017–18 season)	21 May 2018	Leipzig	**Chemie Leipzig**	1–0	Oberlausitz Neugersdorf	4,999	Report
Saxony-Anhalt Cup (2017–18 season)	21 May 2018	Magdeburg	Lok Stendal	0–1	**1. FC Magdeburg**	3,803	Report
Schleswig-Holstein Cup (2017–18 season)	21 May 2018	Flensburg	Husumer SV	0–3	**Weiche Flensburg**		Report
South Baden Cup (2017–18 season)	21 May 2018	Lahr	FC 08 Villingen	1–2	**SV Linx**		Report
Southwestern Cup (2017–18 season)	21 May 2018	Worms	**Wormatia Worms**	3–1 (a.e.t.)	Alemannia Waldalgesheim	3,393	Report
Thuringian Cup (2017–18 season)	21 May 2018	Erfurt	Wismut Gera	0–5	**Carl Zeiss Jena**	2,134	Report
Westphalian Cup (Note: As one of the three largest regional associations, Westphalia gets an additional DFB-Pokal berth, which goes to the winner of a play-off between the best-placed team in the Regionalliga West and the winner of the Oberliga Westfalen.) (2017–18 season)	21 May 2018	Erndtebrück	TuS Erndtebrück	2–4	**SC Paderborn**	978	Report
Württemberg Cup (2017–18 season)	21 May 2018	Stuttgart	TSV Ilshofen	0–3	**SSV Ulm**	3,900	Report
