= Marinus Bester =

German footballer

Personal information
- Date of birth: 16 January 1969 (age 57)
- Place of birth: Hamburg, West Germany
- Height: 1.93 m (6 ft 4 in)
- Position: Striker

Youth career
- SV Halstenbek-Rellingen
- TSV Eintracht Hittfeld
- –1990: FC Süderelbe Hamburg

Senior career*
Years	Team	Apps	(Gls)
1990–1992	Werder Bremen II	57	(39)
1990–1995	Werder Bremen	15	(0)
1992–1993	→ Hamburger SV (loan)	17	(3)
1993	→ Schalke 04 (loan)	5	(0)
1995–1996	SC Concordia von 1907	31	(7)
1996–1998	VfL 93 Hamburg		
1998–2000	Lüneburger SK	63	(42)
2000–2003	Hamburger SV II	78	(57)
2000–2002	→ Hamburger SV	15	(2)
Total		281	(150)

Managerial career
- 2013–2015: SG Scharmbeck-Pattensen
- 2015–2017: VfL Maschen
- 2018: Hamburger SV (assistant)
- 2019: TSV Buchholz 08
- * Club domestic league appearances and goals

Marinus Bester (born 16 January 1969) is a German former professional footballer who played as a striker.

== Coaching career ==
=== Hamburger SV ===
From February 2002 to August 2004, Bester worked as a press officer for Hamburger SV. Retiring from football in 2003, Bester became Hamburger SV's team manager. From January 2016, he became responsible for coordinating all areas for the U17, U19 and U23s: from team training to additional units, selection measures to the private fields of school, training and consultants. Beside this role, he also functioned as an assistant manager under Christian Titz in 2018. After almost twenty years in various functions, Bester left the club in late January 2019 because he wanted to try something new.

Bester also worked as a youth coach at JFV Ashausen-Scharmbeck/Pattensen for several years during his time in Hamburger SV.

=== SG Scharmbeck-Pattensen ===
In November 2012 it was confirmed, that Bester would become the manager of SG Scharmbeck-Pattensen from the 2013–14 season. He left the position in the summer 2015.

=== TSV Eintracht Hittfeld ===
In November 2013, Bester became the chairman of his former youth club TSV Eintracht Hittfeld where he also played for the club's oldboys team.

=== VfL Maschen ===
From October 2015 until the end of 2017, Bester was the manager of VfL Maschen.

=== TSV Buchholz 08 ===
In February 2019 it was confirmed, that Bester would take charge of TSV Buchholz 08 from the 2019–20 season. He decided to resign on 5 November 2019.

== Honours ==
- DFB-Pokal: 1990–91, 1993–94
- UEFA Cup Winners' Cup: 1991–92
