= SV Lurup =

German football club

- Full name: SV Lurup Hamburg 1923 e.V.
- Founded: 1923
- Ground: Stadion an der Flurstraße
- Capacity: 60
- Manager: Oliver Dittberner
- League: Landesliga Hamburg-Hammonia (VI)
- 2015–16: Oberliga Hamburg (V), 18th (relegated)
Home colours	Away colours

SV Lurup is a German association football club from the city of Hamburg in the federal state of the same name.

== History ==
The club was founded in 1923 as Turn- und Sportverein Lurup in the former town Lurup and later that same year merged with FSV 1920 Schenefeld to form TSV Lurup-Schenefeld in a union that lasted until 1930 when the two clubs went their separate ways. Both sides were workers' sports clubs which were regarded as too left leaning and politically undesirable by the Nazis. They were among numerous similar associations disbanded by the regime in 1933. The former membership of FSV was re-organized as Fußball Club Blau-Weiß 1933 Schenefeld and included the football department of TSV Lurup.

On 17 July 1936 FC was in turn merged with Spielvereinigung Blau-Weiß 1896 Schenefeld to play as TuRa Blau-Weiß 1896 in Schenefeld und Osdorf/Nord. Following World War II occupying Allied authorities ordered the dissolution of most organizations in the country, including sports and football associations. TSV 1923 Lurup was re-established in 1946, becoming SV Lurup in 1949, and SV Lurup-Hamburg in 1978.

Throughout its existence to this point Lurup had played as an anonymous local side. At the time of the 1963 formation of the Bundesliga, Germany's first top-flight profession league, the club was playing in the Landesliga Hamburg (V). In the mid-70s shipping company Stauerei Tiedemann came on as the major sponsor of the club and SV's fortunes soon improved. A division title led to the Verbandsliga Hamburg (IV) in 1975, and a second-place finish there in 1978 saw the team's first participation in the promotion round for the Oberliga Nord (III). They were unable to advance and sponsor Tiedemann withdrew to be replaced by local construction firm owner Uwe Einsath.

A Verbandsliga championship and successful promotion playoff in 1981 put the team into third tier competition. The club's first turn in the Oberliga was short-lived, but they immediately re-bounded with a second Verbandsliga title and playoff win in 1983. Lurup then enjoyed its best ever season, finishing third in the Oberliga Nord (III). The second team side of Werder Bremen captured the division that year, but were ineligible to move up. Lurup subsequently took part in the promotion round for the 2. Bundesliga alongside second-place finisher FC St. Pauli, but performed poorly.

A dispute within the club over the move into professional football soon led to withdrawal of Einsath as sponsor and by 1987 Lurup slipped to fifth tier Landesliga play. With Einsath's later return as sponsor the club recovered itself and by 1992 was again playing third division football in the Amateur Oberliga Nord. League reorganization saw SV into the Regionalliga Nord (III) in 1994 where they would remain until relegated in 1997. The team was unable to attain Einsath's dream of reaching second division competition and he reduced his level of support to the club which fell to fourth division play in the Oberliga Hamburg/Schleswig-Holstein in 1997.

Since Oktober 2001 the club is deeply involved in the life of the Lurup quarter by training the young or lending out sports equipment free of charge.

Lurup narrowly avoided relegation to the Verbandsliga Hamburg (V) in 2001 when several clubs that finished ahead of them in the division withdrew from play. However, the merger of the Oberliga Hamburg/Schleswig-Holstein (IV) and the Oberliga Bremen/Niedersachsen (IV) to create the Oberliga Nord (IV) saw the club slip to the Verbandsliga in 2004. Their recent return to Oberliga play came despite a sixth-place result and accompanying negative goal difference in 2007, as the other clubs that finished ahead of Lurup each declined the opportunity to advance.

In recent seasons the club has been fluctuating between the Oberliga Hamburg and the Landesliga below it, playing in the latter again from 2013 to 2015, when the club was promoted back to the Oberliga on winning its second Landesliga Hammonia title after 40 years. The 2015–16 season proofed dexterous for the club, coming last, losing 33 of 34 season games and being relegated. They have also lost 27 of their 28 games in a lower division in the 2016/17 season, picking up just 3 points.

== Honours ==
The club's honours:

- Landesliga Hamburg-Hammonia
  - Champions: 1975, 2015
- Verbandsliga Hamburg
  - Champions: 1981, 1983, 1992
