= SV Halstenbek-Rellingen =

Football club in Schleswig-Holstein, Germany

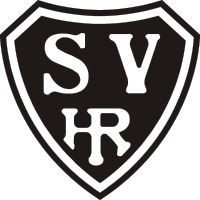
- Full name: Sportverein Halstenbek-Rellingen e.V.
- Founded: 1973
- Ground: Halsfelder Weg
- Capacity: 5,000
- League: Landesliga Hamburg (VI)
- 2025–26: Oberliga Hamburg, 17th of 18 (relegated)
- Website: http://www.sv-halstenbek-rellingen.de/
Home colours	Away colours

The Spielvereinigung Halstenbek-Rellingen is a sports club from the Schleswig-Holstein suburbs of Hamburg, Halstenbek and Rellingen. It was founded in 1910 and consists of the departments of football and tennis. It currently has around 1,200 members.

== Football department ==
Under Manfred Kirsch as coach, the first men's team became champion of the Bezirksliga in 1989. Kirsch switched to the position of league manager in 1990, which he held until 1993. In 1992, the SV Halstenbek-Rellingen was promoted to the Verbandsliga Hamburg, with Roland Lange as the coach.

The team played in the Oberliga Hamburg from 1994 to 1999. They were coached in the Oberliga by Klaus Fock, who held the position between 1993 and 1999. His successor in 1999 was Michael Dahms. In October 2002, the club dismissed Dahms and appointed Oliver Berndt as the new coach. In 2005, the SV HR reached the Hamburg Cup final. There, they were defeated 1:2 by the then-Regionalliga club FC St. Pauli. In 2008, Selcuk Turan was appointed as the new coach, while Berndt remained as the Sporting Director. However, Turan's tenure ended already in November 2008, as the club reported that a trusting collaboration with manager Hans Jürgen Stammer was no longer possible. Initially, assistant coach Ingo Desombre took over as interim head coach. In the spring of 2009, Thomas Bliemeister came in as the coach, and in May 2010, Detlef Kebbe also joined Halstenbek-Rellingen as the manager. The previous manager Stammer, who had held this position for six years, was elected as the club's chairman in 2010.

In the renewed final appearance in the Hamburg Cup competition in 2010, the club narrowly lost to the serial champion of the Hamburger Oberliga SC Victoria. In the same year, the club was relegated from 16th place in the Oberliga Hamburg to the sixth-class Landesliga. As runners-up behind VfL Pinneberg, they immediately gained promotion back.

For the 2014/15 season, the club entered into a cooperation agreement with Eintracht Norderstedt which included the transfer of young Norderstedt prospect players to Halstenbek-Rellingen, who could be recalled by Norderstedt in every transfer period. In March 2016, manager Kebbe announced his resignation.

In the 2016/17 season, SV Halstenbek-Rellingen were relegated from the Oberliga Hamburg to the Landesliga Hamburg. To prevent relegation, the club tried a coaching change in March 2017 and dismissed Bliemeister, whose tenure had lasted around eight years. Heiko Barthel, who had already been appointed as the new coach from the start of the 2017/18 season, took over the position in mid-March 2017 with immediate effect, but was unable to avert the Oberliga relegation. In May 2017, SV HR reached the final of the Hamburg Cup competition again and lost to Eintracht Norderstedt.

On the last matchday of the 2022/23 season in the Landesliga Hammonia, SV HR overtook HSV Barmbek-Uhlenhorst and finished second, which meant participation in the promotion playoff. In this, they defeated Düneberger SV overall 5:4 over a two-legged tie. Thus, Halstenbek-Rellingen under coach Barthel were promoted to the Oberliga Hamburg.

Here is the article content translated to English Wikipedia markup:

Nationally known athletes from this club are Kay Rückert (1991 trial training with second division club FC St. Pauli, at that time also in talks with Bayer Uerdingen, contract player with the Werder Bremen Amateurs in 1994/95), Michael Dahms (previously FC St. Pauli), Craig Hyde (formerly San Diego Nomads, USA, later director of a soccer school in California), Michael Fischer (formerly FC St. Pauli), Claus Reitmaier (previously VfL Wolfsburg, 1. FC Kaiserslautern, Karlsruher SC) and Jan-Marc Schneider (later at FC St. Pauli).

The home games take place on the club's own facility in Lütten Hall. The tennis courts are also located there. In total, the Lütten Hall facility has three soccer and 13 tennis courts. The playing field of the league team is named after the former president Jacob Thode.

== Tennis department ==
The men's team plays in the 2nd Bundesliga Nord.

In 1982, under the leadership of Jörg Seck, youth work was built up in the club. Trainer Jens Güllich was also one of the responsible parties for the upswing in the youth sector. In 1992, Karsten Schröder took over the task from Seck. In 1991, two SVHR players, Wolfgang Winkler and Mark Gienke, were part of the Hamburg team that won the German team championships of the state associations. In the mid-1990s, the youth work of the SVHR was leading in the greater Hamburg area. In 1994, the club won three of the four Hamburg youth championship titles. In the same year, the Finn Olli Rahnasto was brought in as a coach for the club. In 1995, the men's team finished second in the North German Championship (outdoor). In March 1996, consisting of Mark Gienke, Arne and Lars Kreitz, Olli Rahnasto, and Wolfgang Winkler, they won the North German Indoor Championship In the same month, SVHR player Arne Kreitz became German Youth Champion. In 1997, the men's team played for promotion to the Bundesliga.
