= Landesliga Hamburg-Hammonia =

- Founded: 1947 / 1953
- Country: Germany
- State: Hamburg
- Number of clubs: 16
- Level on pyramid: Level 6
- Promotion to: Oberliga Hamburg
- Relegation to: Bezirksliga Hamburg-Nord; Bezirksliga Hamburg-West
- Current champions: 3 division winners (2021–22)

The Landesliga Hamburg-Hammonia is the sixth tier of the German football league system and the second-highest league in the German state of Hamburg, together with the Landesliga Hamburg-Hansa. It is named after the Latin word for Hamburg, Hammonia.

== Overview ==
=== 1947 to 1950 ===
The league was formed in 1947, alongside three other divisions on the same level in the city of Hamburg, as the Bezirksklasse Hamburg-Hammonia. The other three leagues were:

- Bezirksklasse Hamburg-Hansa
- Bezirksklasse Hamburg-Germania
- Bezirksklasse Hamburg-Olympia

The four new leagues replaced the 1. Klasse Hamburg as the feeder leagues to the Stadtliga Hamburg, which was now renamed Verbandsliga Hamburg. The 1. Klasse Hamburg had been operating since the end of the Second World War in 1945 and consisted of three divisions. The change in the league system at this level came together with the establishment of the Oberliga Nord as the new tier-one league in Northern Germany. This meant the new Bezirksklasse in Hamburg was now the third tier of the league system, below Oberliga and Verbandsliga.

The league started out with ten clubs, with the league champion being promoted to the Verbandsliga. In its second season, the league expanded to twelve clubs. The league above it was renamed from Verbandsliga Hamburg to Amateurliga Hamburg at the end of this season. The year after, in 1950, the Amateurliga was then reduced to one single division from the two it had been operating at previously.

For the Bezirksklasse, this also meant a change: The four existing divisions were disbanded and replaced by two leagues:

- Bezirksklasse Hamburg-Alster
- Bezirksklasse Hamburg-Elbe

For the Hammonia-division (German: Hammonia-Staffel) this meant a temporary end to its operation.

=== 1953 to 1963 ===
In 1953, the league was once more reestablished and the Elbe-Staffel and Alster-Staffel disbanded. Three of the four leagues in existence until 1950 were reformed, the Olympia-Staffel however, was not. The leagues were now named Verbandsligas:

- Verbandsliga Hamburg-Hammonia
- Verbandsliga Hamburg-Hansa
- Verbandsliga Hamburg-Germania

Each of the three divisions had now fourteen clubs and the league champion was again promoted directly to the Amateurliga Hamburg. The leagues were again the third tier of the German league system. In the fourteen-team per division era, usually the bottom two teams of each division were relegated. Additionally, teams would be moved between the three divisions according to geographical necessity, to balance them out.

In 1963, the Bundesliga was established in Germany. The old Oberliga Nord was disbanded and at its stead, the Regionalliga Nord was set as the second tier of the league system. The Amateurliga Hamburg, now renamed Landesliga Hamburg, slipped to third tier in the league system, making the three Verbandsligas the fourth tier now. Otherwise, nothing changed for the three leagues.

=== 1963 to 1974 ===
In the first couple of seasons after 1963, nothing changed for the three leagues.

In 1970, the Germania-Staffel was disbanded, leaving only the Hansa and Hammonia division on this level, as it is today. The two remaining divisions were increased in size, Hansa to seventeen and Hammonia to sixteen. Also, the leagues changed their name from Verbandsliga to Amateurliga. The following season, both divisions operated with sixteen clubs.

In 1974, the Regionalliga Nord was replaced by the 2nd Bundesliga Nord as the second tier in the region. As the new third tier, the Oberliga Nord was re-established. The Landesliga Hamburg, now renamed Verbandsliga Hamburg slipped to fourth tier because of this change and the two Amateurligas below it therefore to fifth tier.

=== 1974 to 1994 ===
In 1978, the Amateurligas in Hamburg were renamed to Landesliga, a name they carry to date. Nothing changed otherwise for the Landesliga Hamburg-Hammonia.

The league experienced no change in the two decades from 1974 to 1994, operating on sixteen teams for all but one season. Also, changes in the league system above it did not affect it in this time.

In 1994, however, the Regionalligas were reformed. In the north, this meant a reestablishing of the Regionalliga Nord. The Oberliga Nord was disbanded again and in its stead, the Oberliga Hamburg/Schleswig-Holstein was formed. The Regionalliga becoming the new third tier in the league system meant for the Landesligas that they now fell to sixth tier.

=== 1994 to current ===
The league continued to remain unchanged. The Oberliga Nord was re-formed, again, in 2004, replacing the Oberliga Hamburg/Schleswig-Holstein at this level. This meant no change for the Landesligas.

In 2008, the 3. Liga was established and the Oberliga Nord once more disbanded. Instead of this league, the five northern Verbandsligas were elevated to the status of Oberliga, meaning, the Verbandsliga Hamburg now became the Oberliga Hamburg. The two leagues below it remained as the Landesligas, unchanged in name and tier.

== Position of the Hammonia-Staffel in the league system ==
Years	League name	Tier	Promotion to
1947-48	Bezirksklasse Hamburg-Hammonia	III	Verbandsliga Hamburg
1948-50	Bezirksklasse Hamburg-Hammonia	III	Amateurliga Hamburg
1953-63	Verbandsliga Hamburg-Hammonia	III	Amateurliga Hamburg
1963-70	Verbandsliga Hamburg-Hammonia	IV	Landesliga Hamburg
1970-74	Amateurliga Hamburg-Hammonia	IV	Landesliga Hamburg
1974-78	Amateurliga Hamburg-Hammonia	V	Verbandsliga Hamburg
1978-94	Landesliga Hamburg-Hammonia	V	Verbandsliga Hamburg
1994–2008	Landesliga Hamburg-Hammonia	VI	Verbandsliga Hamburg
2008-current	Landesliga Hamburg-Hammonia	VI	Oberliga Hamburg

== League champions ==
Season	Club
1947–48	TSV Veddel
1948–49	TSV Langenhorn
1949–50	Eimsbütteler SV
1950–1953	no competition
1953–54	Post SV Hamburg
1954–55	Hamburger SV Am.
1955–56	TSV Duwo 08
1956–57	Ahrensburger TSV
1957–58	Düneberger SV
1958–59	Ahrensburger TSV
1959–60	Concordia Hamburg Amateure
1960–61	TSV Langenhorn
1961–62	Barmbek-Uhlenhorst
1962–63	SC Urania Hamburg
1963–64	TSV Sasel
1964–65	TSG Bergedorf 1860
1965–66	SV St. Georg
1966–67	FC Voran Ohe
1967–68	TSV Duwo 08
1968–69	FC St. Pauli Amateure
1969–70	SC Poppenbüttel
1970–71	Blau–Weiß Schenefeld
1971–72	Eidelstedter SV
1972–73	VfL 93 Hamburg
1973–74	Holsatia Elmshorn

Season	Club
1974–75	SV Lurup
1975–76	Viktoria Wilhelmsburg-Veddel
1976–77	Harburger TB
1977–78	FC St. Pauli Amateure
1978–79	Holstein Quickborn
1979–80	TuS Güldenstern Stade
1980–81	SC Pinneberg
1981–82	FSV Harburg
1982–83	FC Altona 93
1983–84	Blau–Weiß Schenefeld
1984–85	FC Süderelbe
1985–86	Rasensport Elmshorn
1986–87	VfL Stade
1987–88	TuRa Harksheide
1988–89	Komet Blankenese
1989–90	FC St. Pauli Amateure
1990–91	SC Langenhorn
1991–92	SV Halstenbek–Rellingen
1992–93	Horner TV
1993–94	Elmshorner MTV
1994–95	SV Blankenese
1995–96	Wedeler TSV
1996–97	Harburger SC
1997–98	Holstein Quickborn

Season	Club
1998–99	ETSV Altona
1999–2000	VfL 93 Hamburg
2000–01	Holstein Quickborn
2001–02	Örnek Türkspor
2002–03	SV Rugenbergen
2003–04	SV Eidelstedt
2004–05	FC Süderelbe
2005–06	TSV Buchholz 08
2006–07	SV Rugenbergen
2007–08	SC Egenbüttel
2008–09	Wedeler TSV
2009–10	Germania Schnelsen
2010–11	VfL Pinneberg
2011–12	FC Elmshorn
2012–13	SV Blankenese
2013–14	VfL 93 Hamburg
2014–15	SV Lurup
2015–16	TuS Osdorf
2016–17	FC Teutonia Ottensen
2017–18	Hamburg-Eimsbütteler BC
2018–19	Hamburger SV III
2019–20	Hamburg-Eimsbütteler BC
2020–21	Season curtailed and annulled
2021–22	Season played in 3 divisions

Source: "Landesliga Hamburg–Hammonia". Das deutsche Fussball–Archiv.
