= TSV Sasel =

- Full name: Turn- und Sportverein Sasel v. 1925 e.V.
- Manager: Jan Ramelow
- League: Oberliga Hamburg (V)
- 2025–26: Oberliga Hamburg, 10th of 18
- Website: https://tsv-sasel.de/
Home colours	Away colours

TSV Sasel is a sports club from the Hamburg district of Sasel in the Wandsbek district. In addition to association football, the club offers badminton, ballet, basketball, handball, judo, karate, tennis, table tennis, gymnastics and volleyball, with the handball division forming SG Hamburg-Nord together with SC Poppenbüttel and TSV Duwo 08.

== History ==
The club goes back to SV Sasel, which was founded in the spring of 1925 and was joined in 1933 by members of the workers' association FTSV Sasel, which was banned by the National Socialists. In December 1935 the club adopted its current name.

== Football ==
In 1963, TSV was promoted to what was then the fourth-class Hammonia association league and made it straight into the regional league. Relegation followed in 1966 after the Sasel team lost out in a playoff against the Harburg clubs Borussia and Rasensport. Three years later they were relegated to the district league. It was not until 1994 that TSV returned to higher leagues and in 2001 managed to return to Hamburg's top division, now known as the Verbandsliga.

With a third place in the 2002/03 season, Sasel achieved promotion to the Oberliga Nord, Hamburg/Schleswig-Holstein season, after the Sasel team, together with Wedeler TSV and TSV Kropp, were able to prevail against VfB Lübeck in the promotion games. In this league season, TSV reached 12th place in the table out of 18 teams, but had to immediately be relegated back to the Hamburg Association League due to the merger of the two seasons into a single-track Oberliga Nord. Back in the association league, TSV celebrated the championship in the 2004/05 season. However, due to the complex licensing process, the club decided against promotion.

The successful team then fell apart and was relegated to the regional league a year later. There the team came third in the Hansa relay in the 2010/11 season and prevailed on penalties against FC Elmshorn in the playoff for promotion to the Hamburg Oberliga. However, TSV Sasel finished the 2011/12 season at the bottom of the table with only ten points and 100 goals conceded. Only one game of the season could be won. After two seventh places and one sixth place in the regional league, the club was in first place in the regional league Hammonia at the winter break of 2015/16, but missed the return to the Oberliga Hamburg at the end of the season as third in the table. In the 2016/17 season, Sasel became champions of the regional league and was promoted back to the top league. After TSV Sasel was able to finish the season in the top half of the table there for three consecutive seasons they achieved the greatest cup success in the club's history in the 2019/20 season when the team reached the final of the Hamburg Cup. However, this was lost 5–1 against the regional league team Eintracht Norderstedt. Sasel ended the 2022/23 season as Hamburg champions. The team also reached the final of the Hamburg Cup again, which they lost 0–1 against FC Teutonia 05 Ottensen. At the end of the season, Daniel Zankl ended his coaching career at Sasel after nine years. It had already been announced in March that Marco Stier would be his successor. At the end of February 2024, he resigned from office with immediate effect for health reasons.

=== Achievements ===
- Champions of the Verbandsliga/ Oberliga Hamburg: 2005, 2023

=== Venues ===
While the first men's team generally plays its home games on the Parkweg sports field, the football games of the other teams, especially those of the youth teams, also take place on the Alsterredder school sports field of the Oberalster high school.

The sports field on Saseler Parkweg was a grand square for a long time. Since such a surface is not permitted for games in the Oberliga Nord, the first men's team had to use the Alsterredder school sports field, which is a grass field, for their home games in the 2003/04 Oberliga season.

In 2013 the Grandplatz was replaced by an artificial turf pitch. In addition, privacy walls were built on the north and east sides of the square. As part of this renovation, the sports field on Parkweg was renamed the Alfred Mager Stadium in the summer of that year. This honors Alfred Mager, who was chairman of the TSV for 45 years.

== Table tennis ==
The club's table tennis department consists of eight men's, four boys' and three student teams in the 2023/24 season. The first men's team plays in the Oberliga Nord-Ost. In the youth sector, Sasel plays in the performance class, the highest league in Hamburg, for both boys (U19) and school students (over 15). The club's top player is the former German international Oliver Alke.

== Handball ==
In the mid-1980s, the HSG Sasel/DUWO syndicate was founded with TSV Duwo 08, which achieved promotion to the Regionalliga Nord several times, but was unable to establish itself there. When the syndicate was expanded to include the SC Poppenbüttel handball department in May 2005, it renamed itself SG Hamburg-Nord. With around 1,000 members of the three clubs and 55 teams, the SG Hamburg-Nord is one of the largest handball communities in Germany.

== Notable people ==
- Oliver Alke
- Antonia Baass
- Bunyamin Balat
- Sirlord Conteh
- Antje Gleichfeld
- Matthias Reincke
- Klaus Thomforde
- Ata Yamrali
- Daniel “Danny” Zankl (coach from 2014 to 2023)

== Literature ==
- Hardy Greens: . In: . AGON, Kassel 2004, ISBN 3-89784-223-8, p. 146.
