= VfL 93 Hamburg =

German football club

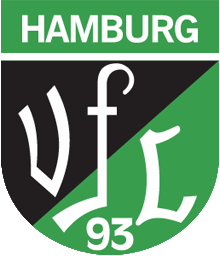
- Full name: Verein für Leibesübungen Hamburg von 1893 .V.
- Founded: 1893
- Ground: Borgweg-Stadion
- Capacity: 3,500
- Manager: Marco Ritter
- League: Kreisliga Hamburg (VIII)
- 2015–16: Kreisklasse Hamburg 7 (IX), 1st (promoted)
- Website: https://www.vfl93.de
Home colours	Away colours

VfL 93 Hamburg is a German association football club from the city of Hamburg.

The club's greatest success has been to earn promotion to the tier three Regionalliga Nord, where it played for three seasons between 1994 and 1998.

== History ==
Formed in 1893, VfL played for much of its history as a local amateur club before making a brief appearance in the Landesliga Hamburg, then the highest league in the state of Hamburg, from 1973 to 1975. The club began its rise through the league system once more in the late 1980s when a local Bezirksliga championship in 1989 took the team up to the tier five Landesliga Hamburg-Hansa. In this league it immediately won another championship and earned promotion to the Hamburg's highest league, the Verbandsliga Hamburg. The team became a dominant side at this level, too but missed out on a third consecutive promotion in 1991 despite winning the league. The following season it finished runners-up but, this time, was promoted. The club played the next two seasons in the tier three Oberliga Nord, finishing eleventh on both occasions. The later one, in 1994, qualified the team for the newly introduced Regionalliga Nord, the new third tier in Northern Germany.

VfL played three seasons in the Regionalliga, finishing twelfth in 1995 but being relegated the season after when it came only sixteenth. Back in the Oberliga, now the Oberliga Hamburg/Schleswig-Holstein, the club won promotion back to the Regionalliga. The 1997–98 season became the club's best at this level, finishing eleventh but choosing to withdraw from the league at the end of season.

VfL stepped down two levels, entering the Verbandsliga for the 1998–99 season. It dropped another level after being relegated in 1999, won promotion back up in 2000 and played in the Verbandsliga for the next six season until a league title took it back up to the re-introduced Oberliga Nord. VfL dropped from this level back to the Verbandsliga and stayed in the league for another season when it was renamed to Oberliga Hamburg after the Oberliga Nord was disbanded again in 2008. The club dropped from there as far as the tier seven Bezirksliga, recovered and won the Landesliga Hamburg-Hammonia in 2014 but instead of taking up promotion to the Oberliga opted to drop down to the tier nine Kreisklasse, where its reserve team previously played.

A league championship in the Kreisklasse in 2015–16 took the club back up to the Kreisliga Hamburg.

== Honours ==
The team's honours:

- Oberliga Hamburg/Schleswig-Holstein
  - Champions: 1997
- Verbandsliga Hamburg
  - Champions: 1991
  - Runners-up: 1992
- Landesliga Hamburg-Hansa
  - Champions: 1990
- Landesliga Hamburg-Hammonia
  - Champions: 2000, 2014
- Hamburg Cup
  - Runners-up: 1990, 1994, 1997, 2007

== Recent seasons ==
The recent season-by-season performance of the club:

Year	Division	Tier	Position
1994–95	Regionalliga Nord	III	12th
1995–96	Regionalliga Nord	III	16th↓
1996–97	Oberliga Hamburg/Schleswig-Holstein	IV	1st↑
1997–98	Regionalliga Nord	III	11th (withdrawn)
1998–99	Verbandsliga Hamburg	V	16th↓
1999–2000	Landesliga Hamburg-Hammonia	VI	1st↑
2000–01	Verbandsliga Hamburg	V	9th
2001–02	Verbandsliga Hamburg	V	11th
2002–03	Verbandsliga Hamburg	V	7th
2003–04	Verbandsliga Hamburg	V	8th
2004–05	Verbandsliga Hamburg	V	8th
2005–06	Verbandsliga Hamburg	V	1st↑
2006–07	Oberliga Nord	IV	17th↓
2007–08	Verbandsliga Hamburg	V	11th
2008–09	Oberliga Hamburg	V	15th↓
2009–10	Landesliga Hamburg-Hammonia	VI	16th↓
2010–11	Bezirksliga Hamburg-Nord	VII	12th
2011–12	Bezirksliga Hamburg-Nord	VII	4th
2012–13	Bezirksliga Hamburg-Nord	VII	1st↑
2013–14	Landesliga Hamburg-Hammonia	VI	1st (withdrawn)
2014–15	Kreisklasse Hamburg 7	IX	3rd
2015–16	Kreisklasse Hamburg 7	IX	1st↑
2016–17	Kreisliga Hamburg	VIII	2nd↑
2017–18	Bezirksliga Nord Hamburg	VII	15th
2018–19	Bezirksliga Nord Hamburg	VII	14th↓

- With the introduction of the Regionalligas in 1994 and the 3. Liga in 2008 as the new third tier, below the 2. Bundesliga, all leagues below dropped one tier. The Verbandsliga Hamburg became the Oberliga Hamburg after the Oberliga Nord was disbanded in 2008.

↑ Promoted	↓ Relegated
