= FC Süderelbe =

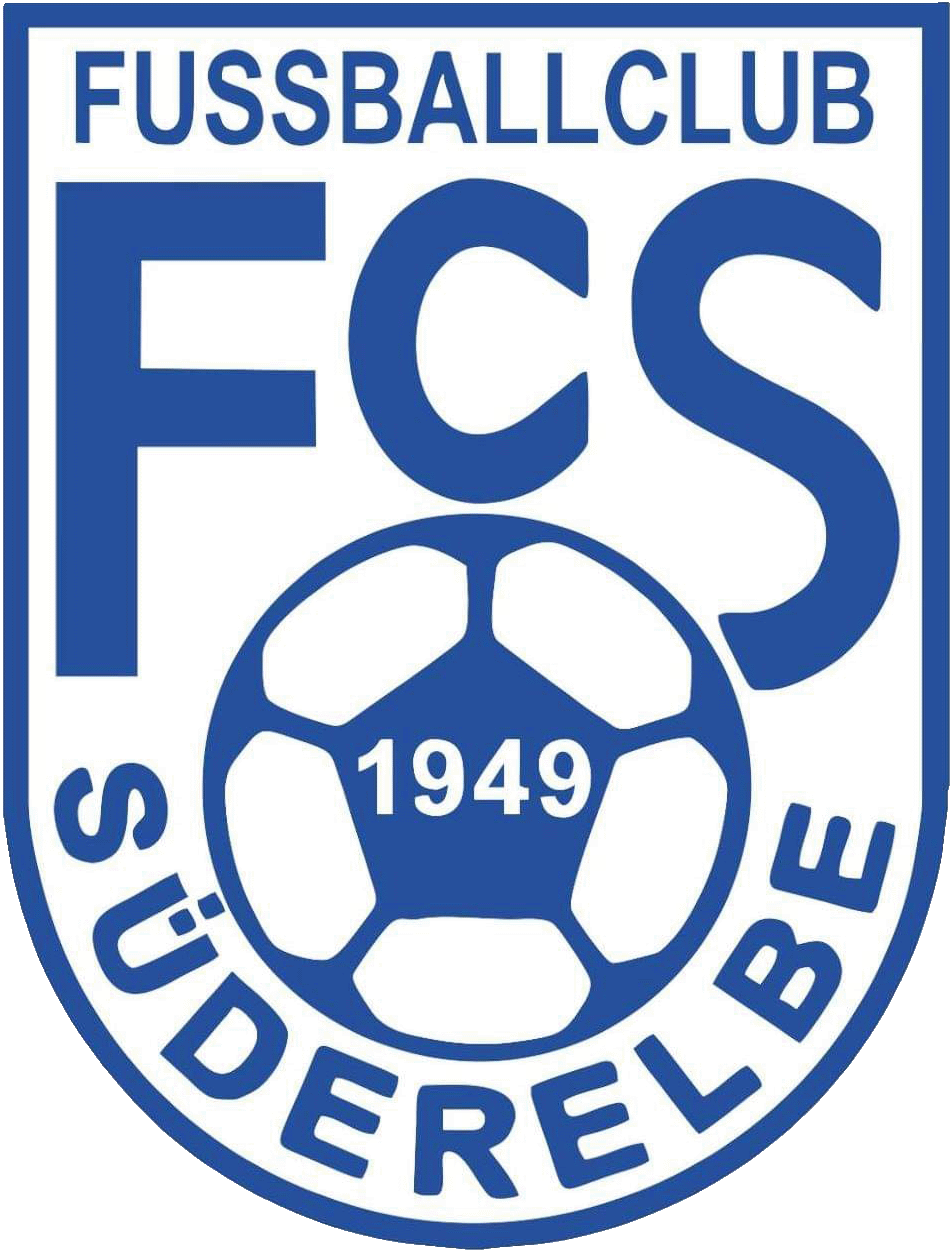
- Full name: Fußballclub Süderelbe von 1949 e.V.
- Nickname: FC Süderelbe
- Founded: 1949
- Ground: Sportanlage Kiesbarg, Hamburg, Germany
- Capacity: 1,000
- League: Oberliga Hamburg (V)
- 2025–26: Oberliga Hamburg, 8th of 18
- Website: https://www.fc-suederelbe.de/
| Home colours | Away colours |

FC Süderelbe (full name: Fußballclub Süderelbe von 1949 e.V.) is a football club based in the Hamburg district of Neugraben-Fischbek, Harburg. The club's first team currently plays in the Oberliga Hamburg, the fifth tier of German football.

== History ==
FC Süderelbe was founded in 1949 when the football department of TV Fischbek split off from the parent club. For decades, the club was only active at the Kreisliga and Bezirksliga levels. The sporting upswing began in the 1970s when Fred Asmußen took over the chairmanship in 1975. Two years later, Bernd Enge joined FC Süderelbe, where he worked as a coach, manager and president in the following years. In 1980, the team was promoted to the Landesliga.

After finishing third in 1983, the club gained promotion to the then fourth-division Verbandsliga Hamburg two years later. Just four years later, FC Süderelbe secured the Verbandsliga runners-up spot behind the amateurs of Hamburger SV. This qualified the team for the promotion round to the Oberliga Nord, where FC Süderelbe won both games against Kickers Emden. Ultimately, the South Hamburg team finished third. In October 1989, Bernd Enge announced his withdrawal at the end of the season. The team once again became Verbandsliga runners-up, this time behind VfL Stade. However, before the start of the promotion round, almost all of the regular players had already signed contracts for the upcoming season with other clubs.

Despite these turbulences, the Süderelbe team had realistic promotion chances after a surprising 2–1 win over VfB Lübeck. However, these were squandered on the last matchday with a 3–3 draw against TuS Celle. This was followed by a rapid downfall. In 1991, FC Süderelbe were relegated to the Landesliga and were promptly demoted to the Bezirksliga. Only with difficulty could a third consecutive relegation be prevented. In the mid-1990s, the football department of Hausbruch-Neugrabener Turnerschaft joined FC Süderelbe, who again focused more on their own youth work. In 1999, the club returned to the Landesliga.

Three years later, FC Süderelbe missed out on promotion to the Verbandsliga after a 1–4 defeat in the decisive game against TSV Wandsetal. Finally, in 2005, the club achieved their second promotion to the Verbandsliga, only to be relegated again the following season. This was followed by several years in the middle of the Landesliga, until the team finished as runners-up behind Buxtehuder SV in 2014. After Oststeinbeker SV withdrew their team to the Kreisliga, FC Süderelbe were allowed to be promoted to the Oberliga.

== Notable players ==
- Erhan Albayrak
- Bünyamin Balat
- Marinus Bester
- Lothar Dittmer
- Friederike Engel
- Kreso Kovacec
- Omar Megeed
- Klaus Ulbricht
