= Oberliga Hamburg =

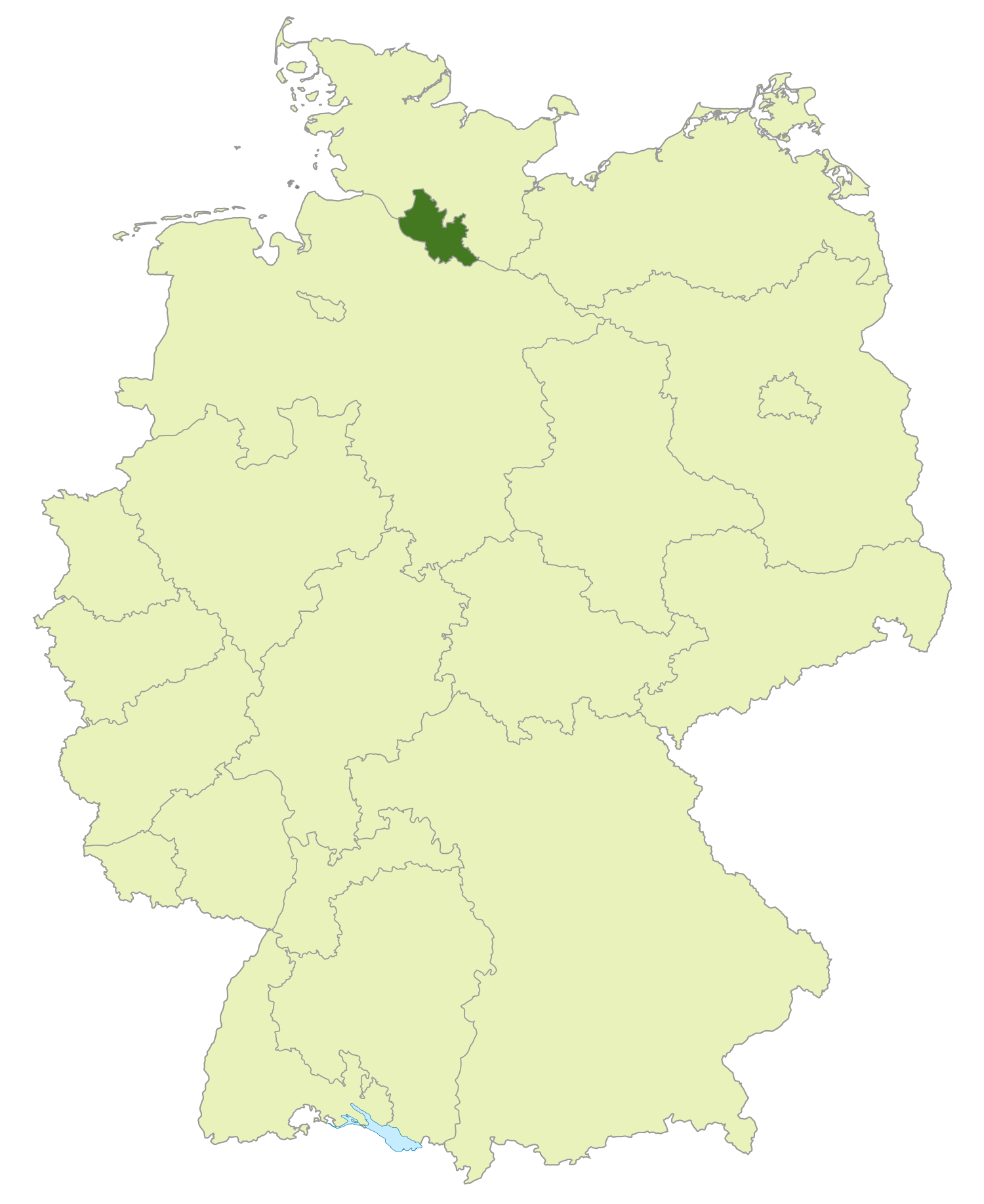
- Founded: 1945
- Country: Germany
- State: Hamburg
- Number of clubs: 19
- Level on pyramid: Level 5
- Promotion to: Regionalliga Nord
- Relegation to: Landesliga Hamburg-Hammonia; Landesliga Hamburg-Hansa
- Current champions: ETSV Hamburg (2025–26)
- Current: 2026–27 Oberliga Hamburg

The Oberliga Hamburg, sometimes referred to as Hamburg-Liga, is the highest league in the German state of Hamburg, incorporating some of its surrounding districts. It is one of fourteen Oberligen in German football, the fifth tier of the German football league system.

== Overview ==
=== 1945–1963 ===
The league was re-formed in 1945 as Stadtliga Hamburg (English: Hamburg City League) by thirteen clubs, in the newly recreated state of Hamburg which was then part of the British occupation zone in Germany. The very first league in the Hamburg & Altona area had been inaugurated as early as 1895.

In its first two seasons, the league was actually the first tier of the German league system for Hamburg, holding clubs like the Hamburger SV and FC St. Pauli in its ranks.

From 1947, the Hamburg-Liga was a feeder league to the Oberliga Nord which its champion had the option of promotion to. Promotion had to be achieved through a play-off with teams from the Amateurligen of Lower Saxony, Bremen and Schleswig-Holstein. As such, the league was by then the second tier of the northern German league system. The league was renamed Verbandsliga Hamburg (English: Hamburg FA League), and split into two groups of ten teams, the Alsterstaffel and Elbestaffel, named after the two main rivers in Hamburg. The top four clubs of the 1946–47 season left the league for the new Oberliga Nord, those clubs being the Hamburger SV, FC St. Pauli, Concordia Hamburg and Victoria Hamburg. Traditionally, the league also accommodated clubs from neighboring Lower Saxony and Schleswig-Holstein (which it still does today), like Lüneburger SK and VfL Stade.

The two divisions were increased in strength to twelve clubs each in 1949. The year after, the league was reunited in one single division with sixteen clubs. It received the new name of Amateurliga Hamburg. The league operated on a strength of sixteen for most of the coming seasons.

=== 1963–1974 ===
In 1963, with the introduction of the Bundesliga, the disbanding of the Oberliga Nord and the formation of the Regionalliga Nord, the league fell to tier three and was again renamed, now Landesliga Hamburg (English:Hamburg State League), but remained unchanged otherwise, with sixteen clubs as its strength. The champion of Hamburg continued to have to play-off for promotion, now to the Regionalliga, with the same opposition as before.

From 1970, the number of leagues below the Hamburg–Liga was reduced from three to two, resulting in the Hammonia-Staffel and Hansa-Staffel which still exist today, first at the name of Verbandsliga, then, from 1978, as Landesliga.

=== 1974–1994 ===
After the 1973–74 season, the Regionalliga Nord was disbanded in favor of the 2nd Bundesliga Nord. The new Oberliga Nord was now introduced in northern Germany, as the third tier of the league system, below the 2nd Bundesliga. This meant for the Landesliga a slip to tier four. The top two teams of the league were however promoted to the new Oberliga. The system for promotion from the league remained mostly unchanged with an ongoing play-off system that saw the top two teams from Hamburg qualified for it.

In 1978, the league went through another name change, this time reverting to Verbandsliga Hamburg.

=== 1994–2008 ===
In 1994, the Regionalliga Nord was re-established, now as the third tier of the league system. The Oberliga Nord was in turn replaced by two parallel Oberligen, Niedersachsen/Bremen and Hamburg/Schleswig-Holstein. For the Verbandsliga Hamburg, this meant a further slip, now to tier five, but also, for the first time in its history, direct promotion for the league champion. Along with its champion being promoted to the new Regionalliga, the league also saw the clubs placed two to eight elevated to the Oberliga.

The 1999–2000 season saw another league system change with the reduction of numbers of Regionalligen, this however had only one effect on the Verbandsliga, no promotion was available this year.

In 2004, it was decided to restore the Oberliga Nord in favor of the two separate Oberligen.

The 2006–07 league winner, SC Victoria Hamburg, did not apply for an Oberliga licence and was not promoted.

=== 2008–present ===
At the end of the 2007–08 season, the new 3rd Liga was established and the Oberliga Nord disbanded, again. The four northern German states were then the only region without an Oberliga and the five Verbandsligen sit right below the Regionalliga Nord, parallel to the two NOFV-Oberligen. At the end of this season, the five winners of the northern Verbandsligen played with the sixth placed team from the Oberliga Nord for one last spot in the Regionalliga. In the future seasons, promotion for the Hamburg champion will only be available through a set of play-off matches with the league winners from Bremen and Schleswig-Holstein. These three teams will compete for one promotion spot to the Regionalliga.

The Verbandsliga Hamburg however maintained its status as a tier five league, but now under the name of Oberliga Hamburg, reflecting the fact that it has been on the same level as the Oberligas. Breaking with a long tradition, the league now operates with eighteen clubs, not sixteen which it had throughout most of its history.

== Position of the Hamburg-Liga in the league system ==
Years	Tier	Promotion to
1945-47	I	Independent league
1947-63	II	Oberliga Nord
1963-74	III	Regionalliga Nord
1974-94	IV	Oberliga Nord
1994-2004	V	Oberliga Hamburg/Schleswig-Holstein
2004-08	V	Oberliga Nord
2008-	V	Regionalliga Nord

Source: "Verbandsliga Hamburg". Das deutsche Fussball-Archiv.

== Founding Members of the Stadtliga Hamburg ==
The league was formed in 1945 from thirteen clubs from Hamburg, these being:

- Hamburger SV
- FC St. Pauli
- Altona 93
- SpVgg Blankenese
- Union 03 Altona
- SC Concordia Hamburg
- Eimsbütteler TV
- SC Victoria Hamburg
- Post SV Hamburg
- Viktoria Wilhelmsburg
- TuS Finkenwärder (contemporary spelling)
- SV West-Eimsbüttel
- FV Wilhelmsburg 09

Source: "Stadtliga Hamburg". Das deutsche Fussball-Archiv.

== League champions ==
The league champions of the Oberliga Hamburg goes as follows:

Season	Club
1945–46	Hamburger SV
1946–47	FC St. Pauli
1947–48	**Eimsbütteler TV**
1947–48	Altona 93
1948–49	ASV Bergedorf 85
1948–49	**Harburger TB**
1949–50	Post SV Hamburg
1949–50	**Altona 93**
1950–51	**SC Victoria Hamburg**
1951–52	**Harburger TB**
1952–53	**SC Victoria Hamburg**
1953–54	SC Concordia Hamburg
1954–55	SC Victoria Hamburg
1955–56	**SC Concordia Hamburg**
1956–57	TSV Uetersen
1957–58	ASV Bergedorf 85
1958–59	Eimsbütteler TV
1959–60	SC Victoria Hamburg
1960–61	Harburger TB
1961–62	SC Victoria Hamburg
1962–63	**HSV Barmbeck-Uhlenhorst**
1963–64	VfL Pinneberg
1964–65	SC Sperber Hamburg
1965–66	**HSV Barmbeck-Uhlenhorst**
1966–67	SV St. Georg
1967–68	VfL Pinneberg
1968–69	TSV Langenhorn
1969–70	TSV Langenhorn

Season	Club
1970–71	VfL Pinneberg
1971–72	ASV Bergedorf 85
1972–73	**VfL Pinneberg**
1973–74	**SC Victoria Hamburg**
1974–75	VfL Pinneberg
1975–76	ASV Bergedorf 85
1976–77	**VfL Pinneberg**
1977–78	ASV Bergedorf 85
1978–79	VfL Stade
1979–80	**Hummelsbüttler SV**
1980–81	**SV Lurup**
1981–82	Hummelsbüttler SV
1982–83	**SV Lurup**
1983–84	**Hummelsbüttler SV**
1984–85	Holstein Quickborn
1985–86	Hamburger SV II
1986–87	Hamburger SV II
1987–88	Meiendorfer SV
1988–89	**Hamburger SV II**
1989–90	**VfL Stade**
1990–91	VfL 93 Hamburg
1991–92	**SV Lurup**
1992–93	SC Concordia Hamburg
1993–94	**SC Concordia Hamburg**
1994–95	**SC Victoria Hamburg**
1995–96	**SC Condor Hamburg**
1996–97	**Vorwärts/Wacker 04 Billstedt**
1997–98	**Rasensport Elmshorn**

Season	Club
1998–99	**TuS Dassendorf**
1999–2000	ASV Bergedorf 85
2000–01	**SC Concordia Hamburg**
2001–02	**Meiendorfer SV**
2002–03	Harburger TB
2003–04	**HSV Barmbek-Uhlenhorst**
2004–05	TSV Sasel
2005–06	**VfL 93 Hamburg**
2006–07	SC Victoria Hamburg
2007–08	SC Victoria Hamburg
2008–09	SC Victoria Hamburg
2009–10	SC Victoria Hamburg
2010–11	**FC St. Pauli II**
2011–12	**SC Victoria Hamburg**
2012–13	FC Elmshorn
2013–14	TuS Dassendorf
2014–15	TuS Dassendorf
2015–16	TuS Dassendorf
2016–17	TuS Dassendorf
2017–18	TuS Dassendorf
2018–19	**Altona 93**
2019–20	TuS Dassendorf
2020–21	None
2021–22	TuS Dassendorf
2022–23	TSV Sasel
2023–24	Altona 93
2024–25	Altona 93
2025–26	ETSV Hamburg

Source: "Verbandsliga Hamburg". Das deutsche Fussball–Archiv.

- **bold** denotes club gained promotion.
- In 1951, the runner–up Lüneburger SK was also promoted.
- In 1952, the runner–up Altona 93 was also promoted.
- In 1963, the runner–up SC Victoria Hamburg was also promoted.
- In 1964, fourth–placed Rasensport Harburg gained promotion instead.
- In 1966, the runner–up SC Sperber Hamburg was also promoted.
- In 1970, the runner–up SC Sperber Hamburg gained promotion instead.
- In 1973, the runner–up SC Concordia Hamburg was also promoted.
- In 1974, the runner–up SC Poppenbüttel was also promoted.
- In 1984, the runner–up Altona 93 was also promoted.
- In 1987, the runner–up 1. SC Norderstedt gained promotion instead.
- In 1992, the runner–up VfL 93 Hamburg was also promoted.
- In 1994, clubs placed second to eighth also gained promotion.
- In 1995, the runner–up Meiendorfer SV was also promoted.
- In 1996, the runner–up Rasensport Elmshorn was also promoted.
- In 1997, the runner–up ASV Bergedorf 85 was also promoted.
- In 1999, the runner–up Eimsbütteler TV was also promoted.
- In 2001, the runner–up ASV Bergedorf 85 was also promoted.
- In 2002, the runner–up Altona 93 was also promoted.
- In 2003, Harburger TB declined promotion; SC Victoria Hamburg, TSV Sasel and Wedeler TSV were promoted instead.
- In 2009, the fifth–placed FC St. Pauli II was promoted instead.
- In 2013, the fourth-placed Eintracht Norderstedt successfully took part in the promotion round to the Regionalliga as champions FC Elmshorn declined.
- In 2014 and 2015, no club applied for a Regionalliga licence from the league or took part in the promotion round.
- In 2016, only sixth-placed Altona 93 applied for a Regionalliga licence.
- In 2017, third-placed Altona 93 applied for a licence and successfully took part in the promotion round.
- In 2020, only the runner-up Teutonia Ottensen applied for a licence and was eventually promoted.
- In 2021, there were no champions or promotions after deciding to curtail and annul the season during the COVID-19 pandemic in Germany.
- In 2023, third-placed Eimsbütteler TV were promoted.

== League placings ==
The complete list of clubs and placings in the league since elevation to Oberliga status (2008–present):

Club	09	10	11	12	13	14	15	16	17	18	19	20	21	22	23	24	25
FC St. Pauli II	5	R	1	R	R	R	R	R	R	R	R	R	R	R	R	R	R
Eintracht Norderstedt	8	10	6	6	4	R	R	R	R	R	R	R	R	R	R	R	R
FC Teutonia Ottensen										3	2	2	R	R	R	R	R
Altona 93	R	3	5	9	2	3	7	6	3	R	1	R	R	R	4	1	1
TuS Dassendorf						1	1	1	1	1	3	1	1	1	2	2	2
Eimsbütteler TV															3	R	3
USC Paloma	11	7	14	15	16		14	17				13	5	6	6	7	4
ETSV Hamburg																3	5
Niendorfer TSV	12	11	12	8	13	7	8	12	14	4	5	6	11	2	5	4	6
HEBC Hamburg											16		12	8	9	5	7
Vorwärts-Wacker Billstedt	16			17						18							8
TSV Buchholz 08	4	2	2	5	3	5	6	5	2	7	9	16	6	9	14	10	9
FC Süderelbe							12	4	15	13	10	12	15	11	7	9	10
SC Victoria Hamburg	1	1	9	1	R	R	2	3	4	2	4	4	2	4	10	8	11
TSV Sasel				18						5	7	5	8	3	1	6	12
FC Türkiye Wilhelmsburg								15	11	16					12	15	13
TuRa Harksheide															11	11	14
SV Halstenbek-Rellingen	14	16		11	7	10	5	10	16							12	15
Wandsbeker TSV Concordia								11	5	9	13	9	4	5	8	13	16
FC Alsterbrüder																14	17
Hamburger SV III																	18
SV Rugenbergen			11	14	10	8	9	8	8	5	12	14	10	12	15	16	
FC Union Tornesch												15	19	14	13	17	
Düneberger SV																18	
Hamm United												10	7	15	16		
Hamburger SV III										17		7	14	13	17		
TuS Osdorf									6	11	8	8	17	10	18		
SV Curslack-Neuengamme	6	4	3	3	6	2	13	9	12	10	11	11	9	7	19		
VfL Lohbrügge		17											16	16			
HSV Barmbek-Uhlenhorst	7	13	15		11	13	3	2	13	8	6	3	3	17			
Bramfelder SV			18		15	18						18	13	18			
Meiendorfer SV	2	5	8	12	9	12	10	16			14	17	18	19			
Wedeler TSV		12	16						7	15	15						
Condor Hamburg	10	9	4	7	5	6	11	7	10	14	17						
VfL Pinneberg				10	14	4	4	13	9	12	18						
Klub Kosova Hamburg									17								
Buxtehuder SV							15	14	18								
SV Lurup	9	15			17			18									
SC Vier- und Marschlande				13	12	15	16										
Germania Schnelsen			10	4	8	14	17										
FC Elmshorn					1	9	18										
Oststeinbeker SV		6	13	16		11											
SC Alstertal-Langenhorn						16											
SV Blankenese						17											
FC Bergedorf 85	3	8	7	2	18												
Concordia Hamburg	13	14	17														
TSV Uetersen		18															
VfL 93 Hamburg	15																
FC Voran Ohe	17																
SC Egenbüttel	18																

=== Key ===
Symbol	Key
B	Bundesliga
2B	2. Bundesliga
3L	3. Liga
R	Regionalliga Nord
1	League champions
Place	League
Blank	Played at a league level below this league
