= ASV Bergedorf 85 =

German football club

ASV Bergedorf
- Full name: Allgemeiner Sportverein Bergedorf- Lohbrügge von 1885 e.V.
- Nickname(s): Elstern
- Founded: 29 March 1885
- Ground: Sander Tannen
- Capacity: 12,000
- Chairman: Klaus Hinz
- Managers: Patrick and Jürgen Paap
- League: Bezirksliga Hamburg Ost (VII)
- 2018–19: 10th
Home colours	Away colours

ASV Bergedorf is a German association football club from the borough of Bergedorf in the city state of Hamburg. The footballers are part of a larger sports club that includes departments for Aikido, badminton, dance, gymnastics, handball, Karate, swimming, table tennis, tennis, and windsurfing.

== History ==
The association was founded on 29 March 1885 as the gymnastics club Allgemeine Turnverein Bergedorf after breaking away from parent club Bergerdorfer Mannerturnverein 1860. It merged with another gymnastics club, Arbeiter Turnverein Phönix Sande, to form Freien Turnerschaft Bergedorf-Sande in 1911. A football department was formed within this club the following year. The renaming of the city district of Sande in 1929 led to the association adopting the name Freie Turnerschaft Bergedorf-Lohbrügge.

Historical logo of ASV Bergedorf 85

As a workers club, the team played in the Arbeiter-Turn- und Sportbund (ATSB). With the rise to power of the Nazis this league was dissolved and many workers clubs disappeared or became part of associations that were more politically palatable to the regime. FT slipped to lower-tier play until the end of World War II when all organizations in the country, including sports and football clubs, were ordered dissolved by occupying Allied authorities. The club was re-established on 20 January 1946 as ASV Bergedorf 1885.

The club enjoyed some success immediately after the war advancing out of fourth tier city league play into the second division Verbandsliga Alster by 1948. The team continued to play at that level in the Amateurliga Hamburg (II) until earning promotion to the top flight Oberliga Nord in 1958. They earned lower table results there until the 1963 formation of the Bundesliga, Germany's first professional football league, when ASV became part of the new Regionalliga Nord (II). The club continued to earn lower table finishes here until finally relegated to the Verbandsliga Hamburg (III) in 1969. Their slide continued as the Verbandliga became a fourth-tier circuit in 1974 and fifth tier in 1994 through league re-structuring.

Nowadays the club plays in the tier seven Bezirksliga, for a time not having fielded its own team at all after the football department left the club in 2009 to join newly formed FC Bergedorf 85.

== Honours ==
The club's honours:

- Verbandsliga Hamburg
  - Champions: 1972, 1976, 1978
- Verbandsliga Hamburg-Germania (III)
  - Champions: 1948
- Hamburger Pokal
  - Winners: 1992, 2003

== Stadium ==
ASV plays its home fixtures in the Sander Tannen stadium. in Lohbrügge in Hamburg.

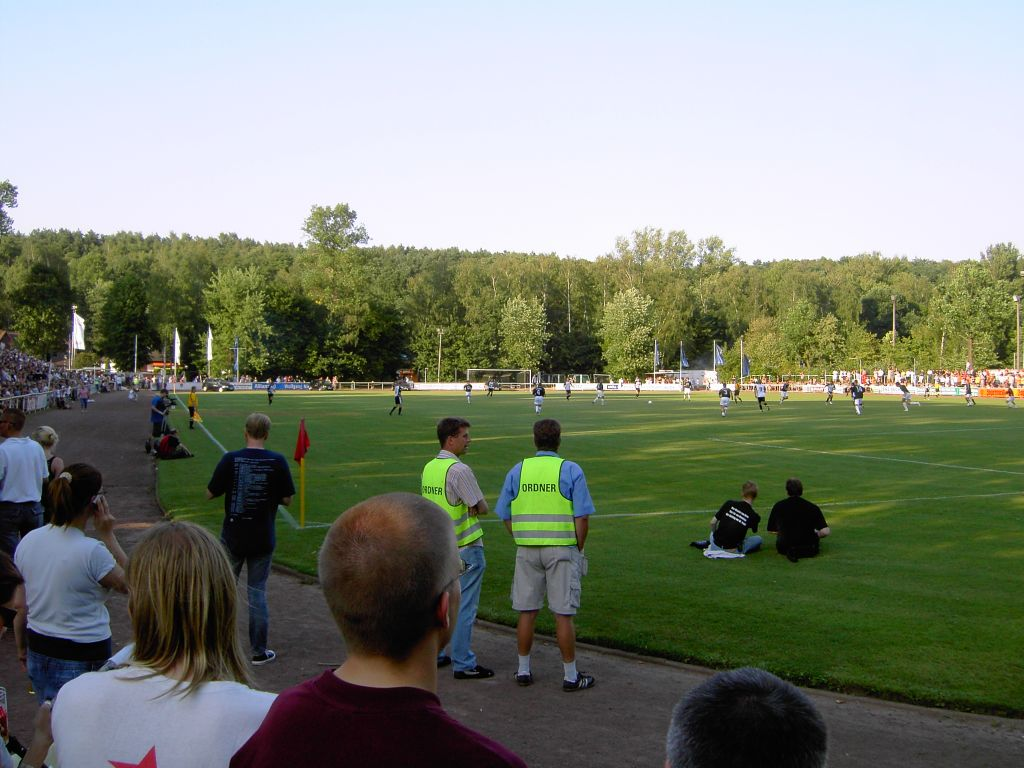
View from south to north

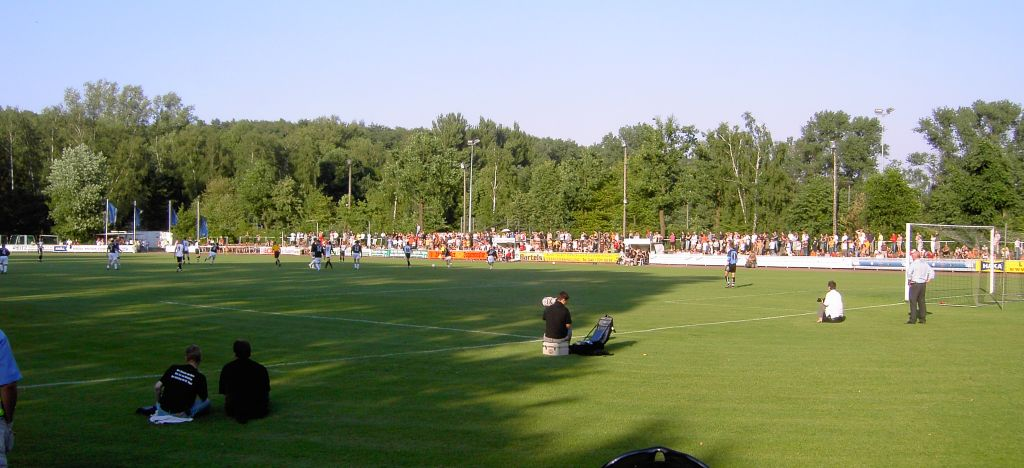
Back straight

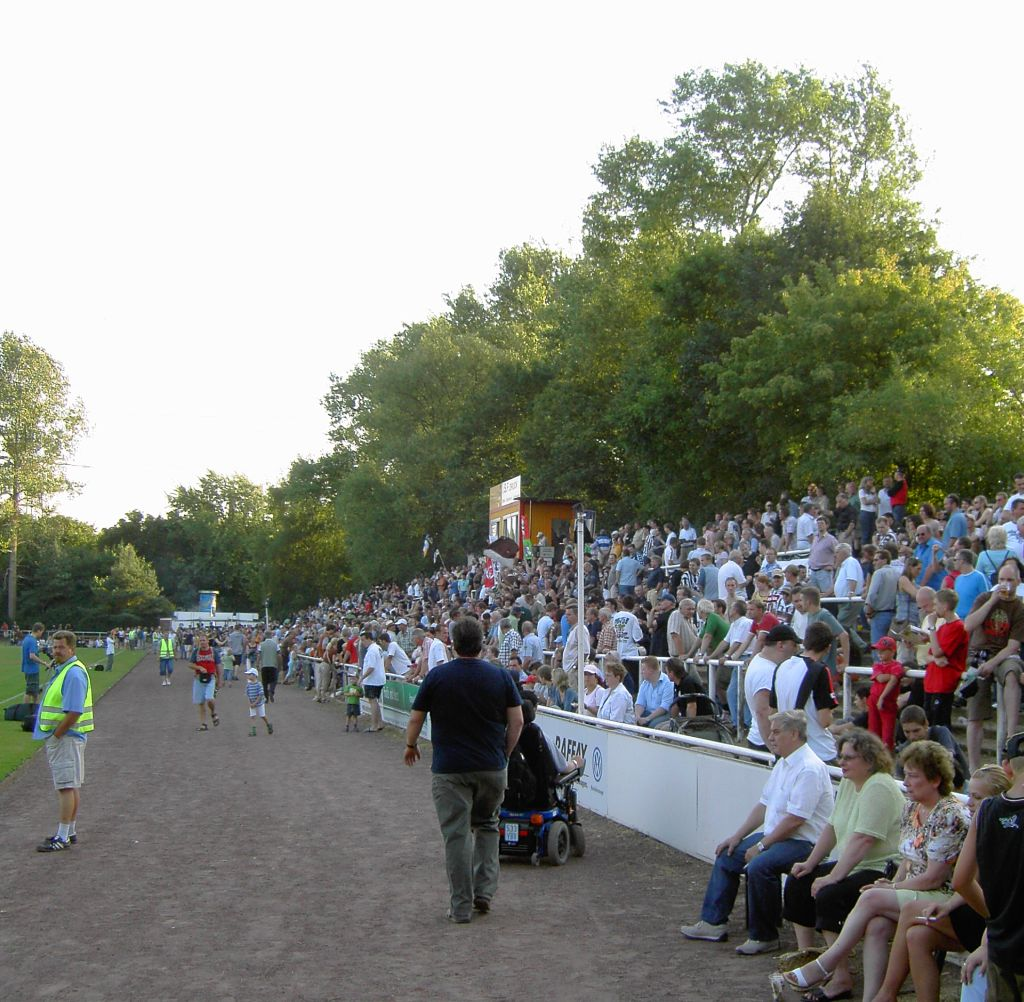
Main bridge
