= TuS Dassendorf =

German football club

- Full name: Turn- und Sportgemeinschaft Dassendorf von 1948 e.V.
- Founded: 1948
- Ground: Stadion am Wendelweg
- Capacity: 2,500
- Manager: Jean-Pierre Richter
- League: Oberliga Hamburg (V)
- 2025–26: Oberliga Hamburg, 3rd of 18
- Website: https://www.tus-dassendorf-liga.de
Home colours

TuS Dassendorf is a German association football club from the municipality of Dassendorf, Schleswig-Holstein. The club's greatest success has been promotion to the tier five Oberliga Hamburg in 2013 and winning the league in each of its first five seasons there.

It has also qualified for the first round of the DFB-Pokal, the German Cup, on two occasions, courtesy of a Hamburger Pokal win.

== History ==
The club was formed in June 1948 in Brunstorf, a village near Dassendorf and carried the name TuS Brunsdorf-Dassendorf from 1949 to 1958 when it adopted its current name. After almost 40 years in local Mateus football the club began its rise in the mid-1990s when local entrepreneur Günter Wunder began investing in the team, allowing for semi-professional structures. When Wunder withdrew his support again in 2001 the club entered an era of decline.

TuS Dassendorf won promotion to the Verbandsliga Hamburg in 1997 through a championship in the Landesliga Hamburg-Hansa and came third in its first season there. It won the Verbandsliga in 1999 and earned promotion to the tier four Oberliga Hamburg/Schleswig-Holstein. The club came ninth in the league in its first season there but withdrew from the league after finishing fourteenth the following year. The club won the Hamburger Pokal in 2000 and thereby qualified for the first round of the 2000–01 DFB-Pokal where it lost 5–0 to SpVgg Unterhaching in the first round.

Upon return to the Verbandsliga the club competed as a lower table side and was relegated from the league in 2004. It competed in the Landesliga Hamburg-Hansa for the next nine seasons, generally as a mid-table side. In 2012–13 a second place in the Landesliga and success in the promotion round finally took the club back up to the highest league in Hamburg which now had become the Oberliga Hamburg.

The club won the Oberliga Hamburg in 2013–14, in its first season there, but declined the option to take part in the promotion round to the Regionalliga Nord. It went on to win the league for the next four seasons but declined to take part in the promotion round.

== Honours ==
The club's honours:

=== League ===
- Oberliga Hamburg
  - Champions: 2014, 2015, 2016, 2017, 2018, 2020, 2022
- Verbandsliga Hamburg
  - Champions: 1999
- Landesliga Hamburg-Hansa
  - Champions: 1997

=== Cup ===
- Hamburger Pokal
  - Winners: 2000, 2018, 2019

== Recent seasons ==
The recent season-by-season performance of the club:

Season	Division	Tier	Position
2003–04	Verbandsliga Hamburg	V	13th ↓
2004–05	Landesliga Hansa	VI	6th
2005–06	Landesliga Hansa	VI	7th
2006–07	Landesliga Hansa	VI	3rd
2007–08	Landesliga Hansa	VI	3rd
2008–09	Landesliga Hansa	VI	8th
2009–10	Landesliga Hansa	VI	7th
2010–11	Landesliga Hansa	VI	5th
2011–12	Landesliga Hansa	VI	7th
2012–13	Landesliga Hansa	VI	2nd ↑
2013–14	Oberliga Hamburg	V	1st
2014–15	Oberliga Hamburg	V	1st
2015–16	Oberliga Hamburg	V	1st
2016–17	Oberliga Hamburg	V	1st
2017–18	Oberliga Hamburg	V	1st
2018–19	Oberliga Hamburg	V	3rd
2019–20	Oberliga Hamburg	V	1st
2020–21	Oberliga Hamburg	V	–
2021–22	Oberliga Hamburg	V	1st
2022–23	Oberliga Hamburg	V	2nd
2023–24	Oberliga Hamburg	V	2nd

Key

↑ Promoted	↓ Relegated
