= Wedeler TSV =

German football club

- Full name: Wedeler Turn- und Sportverein von 1863 e.V.
- Founded: 1863
- Ground: Elbestadion
- Capacity: 3,000
- Manager: Thomas Urban
- League: Kreisklasse A (IX)
- 2018–19: Oberliga Hamburg (V), 15th
- Website: https://www.wedeler-tsv.de
Home colours	Away colours

Wedeler TSV is a German association football club from the town of Wedel, Schleswig-Holstein, on the outskirts of Hamburg. Established in 1863 as a gymnastics club, the current day sports club has departments for Aikido, athletics, badminton, bowling, boxing, dance, fitness, gymnastics, handball, Judo, Karate, running, swimming, and table tennis. The football side currently plays in the Oberliga Hamburg (V).

== History ==
Following World War II Germany was divided into four occupation zones by the victorious Allies. Most organizations in the country, including sports and football clubs, were dissolved by occupying authorities as having been politically comprised under the Nazi regime. Football competition was quickly reestablished within Hamburg, which was part of the British occupation zone. Wedeler played in the Bezirksklasse Hamburg (III) in 1947–49 and became part of the new Amateurliga Hamburg (II) following a first-place finish there and league reorganization in 1949.

The club spent only a single season at that level before slipping back to compete as a third-tier side through the 1950s, 1960s, and on into the early 1970s. League restructuring reduced the club to the fifth division. They narrowly missed making their way back up after losing the deciding match of the 1975–76 season which left them tied on points for first place with FC Viktoria Wilhelmsburg which advanced instead. TSV continued to be competitive finishing in second place in each of the next two seasons behind Harburger TB and the second-team side of FC St. Pauli before finally being relegated in 1980.

Wedel remained a fifth- and sixth-tier side into the new millennium. They made a single season appearance in the Oberliga Hamburg/Schleswig-Holstein (IV) in 2003–04, but were quickly relegated after finishing 17th. A Landesliga title in 2009 returned the team to the Oberliga, which was now a fifth-tier circuit after the introduction of the 3. Liga. After relegation from the Oberliga in 2011 the club returned to playing in the Landesliga Hamburg-Hammonia again. Following a 2nd place in the 2015–16 season the club won promotion to the Oberliga Hamburg, from which its first team withdrew in 2019 for personnel reasons, dropping down to the Kreisklasse A (IX) after forming a joint team with a new club Sportfreunden Holm.

== Honours ==
The club's honours:

- Landesliga Hamburg-Hammonia: 1996, 2009; runners-up: 2016
