= USC Paloma Hamburg =

German football club

- Full name: Uhlenhorster Sport-Club "Paloma" von 1909 e. V.
- Nickname: Paloma
- Founded: 1909; 117 years ago
- Ground: Brucknerstraße, Hamburg
- League: Oberliga Hamburg (V)
- 2025–26: Oberliga Hamburg, 5th of 18
Home colours	Away colours

USC Paloma Hamburg, also known as simply USC Paloma, is a German association football club from the city of Hamburg.

== History ==
The club was formed in August 1909 by a group of sports-mad juveniles and takes its name from the Spanish word for dove. A multi-sport club, Paloma has departments for badminton, basketball, gymnastics, judo, jiu jitsu, kung fu, table tennis, and handball. The handball-team won the Hamburg Oberliga championship in 2007–08.

After their first Hamburger Pokal (Hamburg Cup) win in 2002 Paloma took part in the opening round of the 2002–03 DFB-Pokal (German Cup) where they lost 0–5 to Bundesliga side 1. FC Kaiserslautern. A second Hamburger Pokal win in 2014 returned the team to DFB-Pokal play, this time to face Bundesliga club TSG 1899 Hoffenheim who beat USC 0–9.

After two seasons in the Oberliga Hamburg (V) Paloma was relegated in 2016 and currently play in the Landesliga Hamburg-Hansa (VI).

== Honours ==
The club's honours:

- Hamburger Pokal
  - Champions: 2002, 2014
