= SC Condor Hamburg =

German football club

- Full name: Sport Club Condor von 1956 e.V.
- Founded: 1956
- Ground: Sportpark Oldenfelde
- Capacity: 2,500
- League: Landesliga Hamburg (VI)
- 2021–22: 8th
- Website: https://sccondor.de
Home colours	Away colours

SC Condor Hamburg is a German association football club from the city of Hamburg. The club was formed 13 July 1956 by former members of Farmsener Turnverein. A multi-sport club, Condor has departments for bowling, boxing, dancing, gymnastics, handball, Karate, Nordic Walking, tennis, table tennis, and volleyball. Between 1977 and 1985 the club also had an ice hockey team that played at the Regionalliga (IV) level.

== History ==
Through the 1970s and 1980s SC Condor was a sixth-division side, until advancing to fifth-tier play in the 1990s. They played a single season in the fourth-division Oberliga Hamburg/Schleswig-Holstein in 1996–97. SC Condor also made an appearance in the opening round of the DFB-Pokal (German Cup), where they lost 4–0 to SG Wattenscheid 09. Since 2007 they have been part of the Oberliga Hamburg (V) or Hamburgliga which became a fifth-tier circuit after the introduction of the 3. Liga in 2008.

== Honours ==
The club's honours:

- Verbandsliga Hamburg (V): 1996
- Landesliga Hamburg (VI): 1983, 1991
- Hamburg Cup: runners-up 2014, 2015
