= VfL Pinneberg =

German football club

- Full name: Verein für Leibesübungen Pinneberg e.V.
- Founded: 1945
- Ground: Stadion 1 an der Fahltsweide
- Capacity: 6,000
- Chairman: Carsten Lienau
- Head Coach: Michael Fischer
- League: Oberliga Hamburg (V)
- 2015–16: 13th
- Website: https://www.vfl-pinneberg.de

VfL Pinneberg is a German association football club from the town of Pinneberg, Schleswig-Holstein. Despite its location in Schleswig-Holstein the club plays in the football leagues of near-by Hamburg.

The club's greatest success has been promotion to the tier two Regionalliga Nord in 1973, where it played for a season. VfL also made one appearance in the DFB-Pokal, the German Cup, in 1976–77, where it lost 4–0 to FC Augsburg in the first round.

Apart from football the club also offers other sports like volleyball, field hockey and basketball.

== History ==
Formed in 1945 VfL Pinneberg entered league football in the 1946–47 season at the lowest level in Hamburg, eventually working its way up to what was then the tier two Amateurliga Hamburg in 1960. VfL became a strong side at this level which dropped to the third tier after the introduction of the Bundesliga in 1963. After a number of league titles and unsuccessful promotion rounds to the Regionalliga the club finally moved up in 1973.

The 1973 Landesliga title earned the club promotion to the Regionalliga Nord, the level below the Bundesliga in Northern Germany at the time. VfL came last in the 1973–74 Regionalliga season, with the league disbanded at the end of it. Back in the Landesliga VfL won the league in 1975 and 1977 and, after the latter, earned promotion to the Oberliga for the first time.

The club played a single season in the Oberliga Nord in 1977–78 but finished 18th and was relegated again. For the next fifteen seasons VfL was back in Hamburgs highest league again, now renamed to Verbandsliga, earning top-four finishes most years. At the end of the 1993–94 season, with the Oberliga Nord disbanded, a fourth place was enough for the club to qualify for promotion.

The next ten seasons from 1994 to 2004 VfL played in the tier four Oberliga Hamburg/Schleswig-Holstein, generally as an upper table side, with a fourth-place finish in 1996 as its best result. When the league was disbanded in favor of the re-formed Oberliga Nord at the end of the 2003–04 season a ninth-place finish was not enough to qualify. Instead VfL dropped down to the Verbandsliga again and suffered another relegation four seasons later, now to the Landesliga. After three seasons there the club recovered and returned to the highest level in the city state again, now renamed to Oberliga.

Since 2011 the club has been playing in the tier five Oberliga Hamburg where it finished fourth in 2014 and 2015.

== Honours ==
The club's honours:

- Landesliga Hamburg (6): 1963–64, 1967–68, 1970–71, 1972–73, 1974–75, 1976–77
- Landesliga Hamburg-Hammonia: 2010–11
- Verbandsliga Hamburg-Germania: 1959–60

== Recent seasons ==
The recent season-by-season performance of the club:

Season	Division	Tier	Position
2003–04	Oberliga Hamburg/Schleswig-Holstein	IV	9th ↓
2004–05	Verbandsliga Hamburg	V	4th
2005–06	Verbandsliga Hamburg	V	4th
2006–07	Verbandsliga Hamburg	V	12th
2007–08	Verbandsliga Hamburg	V	14th ↓
2008–09	Landesliga Hamburg-Hammonia	VI	4th
2009–10	Landesliga Hamburg-Hammonia	VI	6th
2010–11	Landesliga Hamburg-Hammonia	VI	1st ↑
2011–12	Oberliga Hamburg	V	10th
2012–13	Oberliga Hamburg	V	14th
2013–14	Oberliga Hamburg	V	4th
2014–15	Oberliga Hamburg	V	4th
2015–16	Oberliga Hamburg	V	13th
2016–17	Oberliga Hamburg	V	

- With the introduction of the Regionalligas in 1994 and the 3. Liga in 2008 as the new third tier, below the 2. Bundesliga, all leagues below dropped one tier.

↑ Promoted	↓ Relegated
