= Niendorfer TSV =

- Full name: Niendorfer Turn- and Sports Club of 1919 e.V.
- Founded: July 13, 1919
- Ground: Sportcentrum Sachsenweg
- Capacity: 4,500
- League: Oberliga Hamburg (V)
- 2025–26: Oberliga Hamburg, 9th of 18
- Website: https://www.niendorfer-tsv.de/

Niendorfer Turn- und Sportverein von 1919 e. V., short Niendorfer TSV, is a sports club from the Niendorf district of Hamburg. In addition to the football department, whose 1st team currently plays in the Oberliga Hamburg, the club has on offer in the following sports: badminton, baseball/softball, basketball, handball, judo, ju-jitsu, karate, amateur theatre, athletics, prellball, chess, swimming, dancing, table tennis, tennis, gymnastics, and volleyball.

== History ==
The Niendorfer TSV is a sports club with a long tradition, originating from an educational association with the sub-departments of games, hiking and sports. From the educational association, the youth league was founded on July 13, 1919, and the gymnastics teacher Carl Ohl became its first chairman. Shortly afterwards, the club received its current name. As early as 1922, almost every 10th Niendorfer was a member of the club, which then had 244 members.

In 1933, the club chairman became the club leader. Military sports were introduced; votes were replaced by dictation, National Socialism had made its way in. For many years, the Niendorfer Turn- und Sportverein was a pure gymnastics club, not until 1936/37 were a handball and football department created, later fistball and table tennis were added. In 1947, the first club meeting after World War II took place and a foundation festival. The number of members rose to 737. The then fistball department played in the state league, the highest league, in the mid-1950s, both in the men's and women's divisions.

It was not until 1956 that the athletics department was created and new sports followed in quick succession. The Niendorfer TSV developed into a mass sports club. In 1962, the membership exceeded the 1,000 mark. The field handball players of the NTSV played in the 1960s in the I. Division, the highest Hamburg league.

As of December 31, 2021, the club had 7,404 members and was thus one of the four largest in Hamburg. The members can draw from a sports and leisure offer of 45 different activities.

== Fitness studio ==
The Niendorfer TSV operates its own fitness studio called "Adyton", which offers water aerobics, wellness courses such as Pilates, classical strength training as well as rehabilitation sports. In summer, outdoor courses such as Nordic walking are also offered.

== Football ==
In the football department, the Niendorfer TSV offers both recreational and competitive sports with over 50 teams, more than 40 of which are youth teams and around 1,000 active players.

In 2015, the Niendorfer TSV was chosen as the best club in Hamburg in the area of youth football training.

The 1st men's team plays in the Oberliga, the 2nd men's team plays in the Landesliga, and the 1st A-youth team, as well as the 1st B-youth and the 1st C-youth, play in the respective Regionalliga. In the meantime, the 1st A-youth team played in the A-Junioren-Bundesliga from 2017 to 2020, before the Niendorfer TSV voluntarily returned the team to the Regionalliga, as a budget reduction had become necessary due to a change in the main sponsor.

The 1st B-youth team also played in the B-Junioren-Bundesliga in the 2016/17 season.

According to the Hamburg Football Association, the Niendorfer TSV is considered the third most successful youth football club in Hamburg, alongside Hamburger SV and St. Pauli.

== Club magazine ==
The club magazine, Der Niendorfer, is published ten times a year, with a circulation of 2,500 copies.

== Personalities ==
- Paul Janke (2011–2012)
- Ata Yamrali (2008–2009)
- Alexander Laas (1990–2000; 2014)
- Daniel Brückner (2018–)
- Inge Bödding (until 1969)

== Handball ==
Women
As part of the cooperative team Niendorfer TSV and TSV Wandsetal (SG Niendorf/Wandsetal)

- Promotion to the Handball-Oberliga (4th league) 2011, 2013, 2017
- Champion of the Handball-Hamburgliga 2011, 2013, 2017

=== Player personalities ===
- Otto Maychrzak Handball national player
- Yvonne Fillgert Handball national player
