= HSV Barmbek-Uhlenhorst =

German football club

- Full name: Hamburger Sportverein Barmbek-Uhlenhorst von 1923 e.V.
- Founded: 1923; 103 years ago
- Ground: Stadion an der Dieselstraße
- Capacity: 2.000
- Chairman: Marco Peters
- Manager: Michael Koss
- League: Landesliga Hamburg-Hammonia
- 2022–23: 4th
Home colours

HSV Barmbek-Uhlenhorst is a German association football club from the city of Hamburg. The club played as a second and third division side from the early 1960s on into the early 1980s before fading from sight into lower-tier competition.

== History ==
The roots of the side are found in the merger on 10 July 1909 of the local gymnastics clubs Barmbeck-Uhlenhorst Turnverein 1876, Männer Turnverein 1888 Barmbeck-Uhlenhorst, and Barmbecker Turnverein 1902 to create Hamburger Turnerschaft Barmbeck-Uhlenhorst 1876, which formed a football department in 1911. The footballers went their own way as the independent side Hamburger Sportverein Barmbeck-Uhlenhorst on 15 November 1923, and played in lower-level local competition over the next several decades.

During World War II, player rosters were depleted by the demands of armed forces service, and HSV played in various combinations with other shorthanded clubs. In the 1943–44 season, HSV and Post SG Hamburg played as the wartime side Kriegspielgemeinschaft Post/BU Hamburg. On 23 June 1944, HSV and Post were joined with SV St. Georg and Sperber Hamburg to compete for a single season as KSG Alsterdorf in the Gauliga Hamburg (I). Following the conflict each of these clubs was re-established as a separate side with HSV taking on the name Hamburger Sportverein Barmbek-Uhlenhorst. In 1949, Fußball Club Rot-Weiß Hamburg 1923 became part of HSV.

The team captured the Amateurliga Hamburg (III) title in 1963 and beat Leu Braunschweig 3:1 to win its way to the Regionalliga Nord (II). They were quickly relegated, but earned a second Amateurliga title in 1966 to return to the second tier, where they would play the next eight seasons as a mid- to lower-table side. HSV made appearances in the DFB-Pokal (German Cup) tournament from 1973 to 1976, but went out in the early going each time.

The country's football leagues were restructured in 1974, and Barmbek-Uhlenhorst found itself overmatched in the new 2nd Bundesliga Nord, where they finished in 20th place. This second-division adventure left the club crippled under a debt load of more than 500,000 DM. They were sent down to the Amateuroberliga Nord (III), where they struggled for a half dozen seasons until slipping to the Verbandsliga Hamburg (IV). Their fall continued, through the Landesliga Hamburg-Hansa (V) in 1982, to the Bezirksliga Hamburg-Nord (VI) in 1984.

BU clawed its way out of the sixth division with a Bezirksliga title in 1986 and played fourth- and fifth-tier football until league restructuring made the Landesliga Hamburg-Hansa a sixth-division circuit again in 1994. Since 1999, the team has played in the Verbandsliga Hamburg (V) as an upper-table side, earning a single season turn in the Oberliga Nord (IV) in 2004–05. With the disbanding of the Oberliga Nord, the Verbandsliga Hamburg achieved Oberliga status, and the club has been playing at this level since.

Former logo

== Honours ==
The club's honours:

- Amateurliga Hamburg (II)
  - Champions: 1963, 1966
- Bezirksliga Hamburg-Nord (VI)
  - Champions: 1986
- Verbandsliga Hamburg-Hammonia (III)
  - Champions: 1962
- Landesliga Hamburg-Hansa (VI)
  - Champions: 1999
- Verbandsliga Hamburg (V)
  - Champions: 2004
- Hamburg Cup
  - Winners: 2015

== Famous players ==
- Andreas Brehme, playing for the youth and the Oberliga team until 1980
