= Hamburg Cup =

Hamburger Pokal
- Founded: 1982
- Region: Hamburg, Germany
- Qualifier for: DFB-Pokal
- Current champions: Hamburg-Eimsbütteler BC (2025–26)
- Most championships: FC St. Pauli (7 titles)

The Hamburger Pokal (English: Hamburg Cup) is an annual football cup competition, shortly known as Hamburg pokal, held by the Hamburger Fußball-Verband (English: Hamburg Football Association) since 1982. For sponsorship reasons, the official name of the competition is ODDSET-Pokal. It is one of the 21 regional cup competitions in Germany and a qualifying competition for the German Cup, with the winner of the competition being automatically qualified for the first round of the German Cup in the following season.

The record winners of the competition are FC St. Pauli, with seven titles to their name, including three won by their reserve team, FC St. Pauli II.

An earlier competition was held from 1954 but lasted for only two editions. In the 1972–73 season, once more a cup competition was held. The current competition however dates from 1982.

== Mode ==
The competition is open for all member clubs of the Hamburg FA from the 3. Liga (although no team from Hamburg currently plays in this division) to the lowest division, Kreisklasse B (10th tier). Reserve teams are not permitted to compete anymore. Regardless of which club has been drawn first, clubs from a lower league will always have home advantage when playing a club from a higher league. In case of a draw after regular time, extra time is played followed by a penalty shoot out should the game not be decided by then. The cup winner automatically qualifies for the first round of the German Cup.

== Winners ==
The winners of the competition:

Club	Wins	Years
FC St. Pauli	7	1986, 1998^{‡}, 2001^{‡}, 2004, 2005, 2006, 2008^{‡}
SC Victoria Hamburg	5	1990, 2007, 2010, 2012, 2013
Eintracht Norderstedt	5	2016, 2017, 2020, 2021, 2025
FC Altona 93	4	1984, 1985, 1989, 1994
Hamburger SV II	3	1991, 1996, 1997
TuS Dassendorf	3	2000, 2018, 2019
Teutonia Ottensen	3	2022, 2023, 2024
USC Paloma	2	2002, 2014
SC Concordia Hamburg	2	1987, 2009
ASV Bergedorf 85	2	1992, 2003
1. SC Norderstedt	2	1995, 1999
Hamburg-Eimsbütteler BC	1	2026
HSV Barmbeck-Uhlenhorst	1	2015
Eimsbütteler TV	1	2011
Raspo Elmshorn	1	1993
Meiendorfer SV	1	1988
Hummelsbütteler SV	1	1983

- ^{‡} Won by reserve team.
