= TSV Buchholz 08 =

German football club

- Full name: Turn- und Sportverein Buchholz von 1908 e.V.
- Founded: 1908
- Ground: Otto-Koch-Kampfbahn
- Capacity: 3,000
- League: Oberliga Hamburg (V)
- 2025–26: Oberliga Hamburg, 12th of 18

TSV Buchholz 08 is a German association football club from the town of Buchholz in der Nordheide near Hamburg.

== History ==
The club was established in 1908 and is today the largest sports club in the community with over 3,500 members and departments for dancing, fitness, gymnastics, handball, hockey, inline skating, jazz dance, swimming, table tennis, tennis, and volleyball. The club places an emphasis on activities for youth.

The football side was a longtime fixture in the Landesliga Hamburg (V) and was recently promoted to the Oberliga Hamburg (IV) after winning the title in 2007. The Oberliga Hamburg became a fifth tier circuit with the introduction of the 3. Liga in 2009.

As of 2012, the club has won the fair play award of the Oberliga Hamburg for eight consecutive times.
