= 2024–25 Oberliga =

Oberliga
- Season: 2024–25
- Champions: Sonnenhof Großaspach (Baden-Württemberg); VfB Eichstätt (Bayern Nord); FC Memmingen (Bayern Süd); SV Hemelingen (Bremen); Altona 93 (Hamburg); FSV Fernwald (Hesse); Bonner SC (Mittelrhein); SSVg Velbert (Niederrhein); HSC Hannover (Niedersachsen); BFC Preussen (Nordost-Nord); 1. FC Magdeburg II (Nordost-Süd); Schott Mainz (Rheinland-Pfalz/Saar); Kilia Kiel (Schleswig-Holstein); Sportfreunde Siegen (Westfalen)

The 2024–25 season of the Oberliga was the 17th season of the Oberligas, the fifth tier of the German football league system.

== Tables ==
=== Baden-Württemberg ===
| Pos | Team | Pld | W | D | L | GF | GA | GD | Pts | Promotion, qualification or relegation |
|---|---|---|---|---|---|---|---|---|---|---|
| 1 | Sonnenhof Großaspach (C, P) | 34 | 31 | 2 | 1 | 109 | 26 | +83 | 95 | Promotion to Regionalliga Südwest |
| 2 | TSG Balingen (O, P) | 34 | 24 | 4 | 6 | 78 | 44 | +34 | 76 | Play-off |
| 3 | VfR Mannheim | 34 | 20 | 7 | 7 | 71 | 41 | +30 | 67 | |
| 4 | VfR Aalen | 34 | 17 | 9 | 8 | 61 | 32 | +29 | 60 | |
| 5 | 1. CfR Pforzheim | 34 | 18 | 6 | 10 | 65 | 44 | +21 | 60 | |
| 6 | SV Oberachern | 34 | 15 | 7 | 12 | 50 | 41 | +9 | 52 | |
| 7 | FC Nöttingen | 34 | 15 | 5 | 14 | 73 | 53 | +20 | 50 | |
| 8 | TSG Backnang | 34 | 14 | 8 | 12 | 60 | 49 | +11 | 50 | |
| 9 | SSV Reutlingen | 34 | 13 | 10 | 11 | 57 | 52 | +5 | 49 | |
| 10 | TSV Essingen | 34 | 14 | 6 | 14 | 46 | 45 | +1 | 48 | |
| 11 | FSV Hollenbach | 34 | 14 | 6 | 14 | 54 | 60 | −6 | 48 | |
| 12 | Normannia Gmünd | 34 | 14 | 3 | 17 | 62 | 65 | −3 | 45 | |
| 13 | FSV Bietigheim-Bissingen | 34 | 12 | 7 | 15 | 54 | 63 | −9 | 43 | |
| 14 | FV Ravensburg | 34 | 9 | 11 | 14 | 40 | 52 | −12 | 38 | |
| 15 | SV Fellbach (R) | 34 | 9 | 3 | 22 | 35 | 84 | −49 | 30 | Relegation |
| 16 | FC Zuzenhausen (R) | 34 | 8 | 3 | 23 | 42 | 87 | −45 | 27 | Relegation |
| 17 | Calcio Leinfelden-Echterdingen (R) | 34 | 5 | 3 | 26 | 38 | 83 | −45 | 18 | Relegation |
| 18 | FC Villingen II (R) | 34 | 4 | 0 | 30 | 30 | 104 | −74 | 12 | Relegation |

Source: Soccerway
(C) Champions; (O) Play-off winners; (P) Promoted; (R) Relegated

=== Bayern Nord ===
| Pos | Team | Pld | W | D | L | GF | GA | GD | Pts | Promotion, qualification or relegation |
|---|---|---|---|---|---|---|---|---|---|---|
| 1 | VfB Eichstätt (C, P) | 34 | 23 | 5 | 6 | 74 | 33 | +41 | 74 | Promotion to Regionalliga Bayern |
| 2 | SC Eltersdorf | 34 | 21 | 10 | 3 | 56 | 24 | +32 | 73 | Play-off |
| 3 | FC Ingolstadt 04 II | 34 | 20 | 6 | 8 | 70 | 46 | +24 | 66 | |
| 4 | ATSV Erlangen | 34 | 18 | 8 | 8 | 52 | 36 | +16 | 62 | |
| 5 | ASV Cham | 34 | 15 | 10 | 9 | 60 | 43 | +17 | 55 | |
| 6 | Fortuna Regensburg | 34 | 15 | 8 | 11 | 84 | 58 | +26 | 53 | |
| 7 | SpVgg SV Weiden | 34 | 14 | 8 | 12 | 47 | 40 | +7 | 50 | |
| 8 | TSV Kornburg | 34 | 13 | 8 | 13 | 58 | 53 | +5 | 47 | |
| 9 | TSV Neudrossenfeld | 34 | 12 | 10 | 12 | 49 | 57 | −8 | 46 | |
| 10 | Würzburger FV | 34 | 12 | 10 | 12 | 50 | 58 | −8 | 46 | |
| 11 | Bayern Hof | 34 | 11 | 10 | 13 | 43 | 40 | +3 | 43 | |
| 12 | ASV Neumarkt | 34 | 13 | 4 | 17 | 39 | 49 | −10 | 43 | |
| 13 | Jahn Regensburg II | 34 | 10 | 11 | 13 | 48 | 51 | −3 | 41 | |
| 14 | TSV Abtswind (R) | 34 | 10 | 10 | 14 | 46 | 51 | −5 | 40 | Relegation play-offs |
| 15 | DJK Ammerthal (R) | 34 | 9 | 8 | 17 | 43 | 51 | −8 | 35 | Relegation play-offs |
| 16 | DJK Gebenbach (O) | 34 | 8 | 11 | 15 | 52 | 71 | −19 | 35 | Relegation play-offs |
| 17 | Eintracht Münchberg (R) | 34 | 5 | 5 | 24 | 30 | 83 | −53 | 20 | Relegation play-offs |
| 18 | TSV Karlburg (R) | 34 | 3 | 6 | 25 | 30 | 87 | −57 | 15 | Relegation |

Source: Soccerway
(C) Champions; (O) Play-off winners; (P) Promoted; (R) Relegated

=== Bayern Süd ===
| Pos | Team | Pld | W | D | L | GF | GA | GD | Pts | Promotion, qualification or relegation |
|---|---|---|---|---|---|---|---|---|---|---|
| 1 | FC Memmingen (C, P) | 32 | 17 | 12 | 3 | 49 | 21 | +28 | 63 | Promotion to Regionalliga Bayern |
| 2 | 1860 Munich II | 32 | 18 | 8 | 6 | 64 | 30 | +34 | 62 | |
| 3 | SV Erlbach | 32 | 16 | 10 | 6 | 33 | 21 | +12 | 58 | Play-off |
| 4 | FC Pipinsried | 32 | 18 | 4 | 10 | 63 | 39 | +24 | 58 | |
| 5 | FC Deisenhofen | 32 | 17 | 5 | 10 | 56 | 45 | +11 | 56 | |
| 6 | TSV Kottern | 32 | 16 | 6 | 10 | 57 | 50 | +7 | 54 | |
| 7 | SV Kirchanschöring | 32 | 15 | 7 | 10 | 57 | 46 | +11 | 52 | |
| 8 | TSV Landsberg | 32 | 14 | 2 | 16 | 64 | 41 | +23 | 44 | |
| 9 | SV Schalding-Heining | 32 | 12 | 8 | 12 | 41 | 47 | −6 | 44 | |
| 10 | SV Heimstetten | 32 | 12 | 5 | 15 | 78 | 70 | +8 | 41 | |
| 11 | TSV 1861 Nördlingen | 32 | 12 | 5 | 15 | 53 | 56 | −3 | 41 | |
| 12 | Türkspor Augsburg | 32 | 10 | 7 | 15 | 37 | 59 | −22 | 37 | |
| 13 | FC Ismaning | 32 | 9 | 8 | 15 | 35 | 51 | −16 | 35 | |
| 14 | TSV Grünwald (R) | 32 | 9 | 6 | 17 | 54 | 78 | −24 | 33 | Relegation play-offs |
| 15 | 1. FC Sonthofen (R) | 32 | 9 | 5 | 18 | 39 | 60 | −21 | 32 | Relegation play-offs |
| 16 | SpVgg Unterhaching II (R) | 32 | 8 | 7 | 17 | 32 | 61 | −29 | 31 | Relegation play-offs |
| 17 | TSV Rain am Lech (R) | 32 | 5 | 5 | 22 | 39 | 76 | −37 | 20 | Relegation |

Source: Soccerway
(C) Champions; (P) Promoted; (R) Relegated

=== Bremen ===
| Pos | Team | Pld | W | D | L | GF | GA | GD | Pts | Qualification or relegation |
|---|---|---|---|---|---|---|---|---|---|---|
| 1 | SV Hemelingen (C) | 30 | 25 | 2 | 3 | 111 | 31 | +80 | 77 | Play-off |
| 2 | ESC Geestemünde | 30 | 18 | 6 | 6 | 98 | 52 | +46 | 60 | |
| 3 | OSC Bremerhaven | 30 | 16 | 7 | 7 | 72 | 63 | +9 | 55 | |
| 4 | Brinkumer SV | 30 | 16 | 5 | 9 | 79 | 53 | +26 | 53 | |
| 5 | TV Eiche Horn | 30 | 15 | 6 | 9 | 66 | 52 | +14 | 51 | |
| 6 | Blumenthaler SV | 30 | 14 | 4 | 12 | 79 | 71 | +8 | 46 | |
| 7 | FC Oberneuland | 30 | 14 | 4 | 12 | 68 | 60 | +8 | 46 | |
| 8 | Union Bremen | 30 | 13 | 3 | 14 | 90 | 69 | +21 | 42 | |
| 9 | SG Aumund-Vegesack | 30 | 12 | 4 | 14 | 69 | 71 | −2 | 40 | |
| 10 | TS Woltmershausen | 30 | 13 | 1 | 16 | 54 | 71 | −17 | 40 | |
| 11 | BTS Neustadt | 30 | 11 | 5 | 14 | 72 | 76 | −4 | 38 | |
| 12 | Werder Bremen III | 30 | 9 | 8 | 13 | 57 | 61 | −4 | 35 | |
| 13 | Habenhauser FV | 30 | 9 | 5 | 16 | 59 | 82 | −23 | 32 | |
| 14 | Vatan Sport Bremen | 30 | 8 | 7 | 15 | 68 | 97 | −29 | 31 | |
| 15 | TuRa Bremen (R) | 30 | 9 | 4 | 17 | 54 | 94 | −40 | 31 | Relegation |
| 16 | SC Vahr-Blockdiek (R) | 30 | 2 | 1 | 27 | 36 | 129 | −93 | 7 | Relegation |

Source: Soccerway
(C) Champions; (R) Relegated

=== Hamburg ===
| Pos | Team | Pld | W | D | L | GF | GA | GD | Pts | Qualification or relegation |
|---|---|---|---|---|---|---|---|---|---|---|
| 1 | Altona 93 (C, O, P) | 34 | 25 | 7 | 2 | 99 | 30 | +69 | 82 | Play-off |
| 2 | TuS Dassendorf | 34 | 26 | 4 | 4 | 98 | 32 | +66 | 82 | |
| 3 | Eimsbütteler TV | 34 | 22 | 4 | 8 | 96 | 48 | +48 | 70 | |
| 4 | USC Paloma | 34 | 22 | 4 | 8 | 84 | 54 | +30 | 70 | |
| 5 | ETSV Hamburg | 34 | 20 | 3 | 11 | 96 | 50 | +46 | 63 | |
| 6 | Niendorfer TSV | 34 | 18 | 7 | 9 | 78 | 44 | +34 | 61 | |
| 7 | HEBC Hamburg | 34 | 16 | 5 | 13 | 56 | 45 | +11 | 53 | |
| 8 | SC Vorwärts-Wacker 04 | 34 | 15 | 5 | 14 | 86 | 97 | −11 | 50 | |
| 9 | TSV Buchholz 08 | 34 | 14 | 4 | 16 | 70 | 76 | −6 | 46 | |
| 10 | FC Süderelbe | 34 | 13 | 5 | 16 | 70 | 83 | −13 | 44 | |
| 11 | Victoria Hamburg | 34 | 12 | 5 | 17 | 69 | 73 | −4 | 41 | |
| 12 | TSV Sasel | 34 | 11 | 7 | 16 | 60 | 73 | −13 | 40 | |
| 13 | Türkiye Wilhelmsburg | 34 | 10 | 6 | 18 | 73 | 94 | −21 | 36 | |
| 14 | TuRa Harksheide | 34 | 9 | 8 | 17 | 63 | 89 | −26 | 35 | |
| 15 | SV Halstenbek-Rellingen | 34 | 10 | 5 | 19 | 53 | 83 | −30 | 35 | |
| 16 | WTSV Concordia (R) | 34 | 8 | 5 | 21 | 47 | 88 | −41 | 29 | Relegation |
| 17 | FC Alsterbrüder (R) | 34 | 7 | 4 | 23 | 37 | 90 | −53 | 25 | Relegation |
| 18 | Hamburger SV III (R) | 34 | 3 | 2 | 29 | 45 | 131 | −86 | 11 | Relegation |

Source: Soccerway
(C) Champions; (O) Play-off winners; (P) Promoted; (R) Relegated

=== Hessen ===
| Pos | Team | Pld | W | D | L | GF | GA | GD | Pts | Promotion, qualification or relegation |
|---|---|---|---|---|---|---|---|---|---|---|
| 1 | FSV Fernwald (C) | 36 | 20 | 10 | 6 | 77 | 35 | +42 | 70 | |
| 2 | Bayern Alzenau (P) | 36 | 19 | 10 | 7 | 91 | 46 | +45 | 67 | Promotion to Regionalliga Südwest |
| 3 | Türk Gücü Friedberg | 36 | 18 | 11 | 7 | 83 | 54 | +29 | 65 | Play-off |
| 4 | Rot-Weiß Walldorf | 36 | 20 | 6 | 10 | 77 | 49 | +28 | 65 (Note: Rot-Weiß Walldorf were deducted one point.) | |
| 5 | Eintracht Stadtallendorf | 36 | 18 | 6 | 12 | 64 | 47 | +17 | 60 | |
| 6 | Darmstadt 98 II | 36 | 18 | 5 | 13 | 69 | 38 | +31 | 59 | |
| 7 | KSV Baunatal | 36 | 17 | 7 | 12 | 67 | 55 | +12 | 57 (Note: KSV Baunatal were deducted one point for failing to meet referee obligations.) | |
| 8 | FC Eddersheim | 36 | 14 | 13 | 9 | 74 | 65 | +9 | 55 | |
| 9 | Hünfelder SV | 36 | 16 | 7 | 13 | 63 | 59 | +4 | 55 | |
| 10 | SC Waldgirmes | 36 | 14 | 8 | 14 | 66 | 71 | −5 | 50 | |
| 11 | SV Adler Weidenhausen | 36 | 12 | 11 | 13 | 66 | 63 | +3 | 47 | |
| 12 | 1960 Hanau | 36 | 14 | 5 | 17 | 70 | 71 | −1 | 47 | |
| 13 | Hanau 93 | 36 | 13 | 7 | 16 | 56 | 71 | −15 | 45 (Note: Hanau 93 were deducted one point.) | |
| 14 | VfB Marburg (O) | 36 | 12 | 8 | 16 | 47 | 59 | −12 | 44 | Relegation play-off |
| 15 | SV Unter-Flockenbach (R) | 36 | 10 | 11 | 15 | 62 | 89 | −27 | 41 | Relegation |
| 16 | FSV Rot-Weiß Wolfhagen (R) | 36 | 10 | 8 | 18 | 52 | 66 | −14 | 38 | Relegation |
| 17 | SV Steinbach (R) | 36 | 8 | 9 | 19 | 42 | 83 | −41 | 32 (Note: SV Steinbach were deducted one point for failing to meet referee obligations.) | Relegation |
| 18 | TuS Hornau (R) | 36 | 6 | 10 | 20 | 55 | 92 | −37 | 28 | Relegation |
| 19 | TSV Steinbach Haiger II (R) | 36 | 4 | 6 | 26 | 41 | 109 | −68 | 18 | Relegation |

Source: Soccerway
(C) Champions; (O) Play-off winners; (P) Promoted; (R) Relegated

=== Mittelrhein ===
| Pos | Team | Pld | W | D | L | GF | GA | GD | Pts | Promotion or relegation |
|---|---|---|---|---|---|---|---|---|---|---|
| 1 | Bonner SC (C, P) | 30 | 23 | 4 | 3 | 83 | 32 | +51 | 73 | Promotion to Regionalliga West |
| 2 | SSV Merten | 30 | 19 | 3 | 8 | 76 | 44 | +32 | 60 | |
| 3 | Siegburger SV 04 | 30 | 18 | 1 | 11 | 71 | 59 | +12 | 55 | |
| 4 | SpVg Frechen | 30 | 15 | 6 | 9 | 56 | 53 | +3 | 51 | |
| 5 | TuS Königsdorf | 30 | 14 | 6 | 10 | 69 | 33 | +36 | 48 | |
| 6 | FC Wegberg-Beeck | 30 | 15 | 3 | 12 | 60 | 51 | +9 | 48 | |
| 7 | SV Bergisch Gladbach 09 | 30 | 12 | 8 | 10 | 60 | 57 | +3 | 44 | |
| 8 | VfL 08 Vichttal | 30 | 13 | 2 | 15 | 64 | 60 | +4 | 41 | |
| 9 | SpVg Porz | 30 | 11 | 4 | 15 | 53 | 67 | −14 | 37 | |
| 10 | Hennef 05 | 30 | 10 | 6 | 14 | 40 | 58 | −18 | 36 | |
| 11 | Teutonia Weiden | 30 | 10 | 6 | 14 | 66 | 94 | −28 | 36 | |
| 12 | Fortuna Köln II | 30 | 10 | 5 | 15 | 51 | 50 | +1 | 35 | |
| 13 | FC Pesch | 30 | 9 | 8 | 13 | 51 | 52 | −1 | 35 | |
| 14 | FC Hürth (R) | 30 | 7 | 12 | 11 | 41 | 49 | −8 | 33 | Relegation |
| 15 | FV Bonn-Endenich (R) | 30 | 6 | 5 | 19 | 37 | 77 | −40 | 23 | Relegation |
| 16 | Union Schafhausen (R) | 30 | 5 | 7 | 18 | 30 | 72 | −42 | 22 | Relegation |

Source: Soccerway
(C) Champions; (P) Promoted; (R) Relegated

=== Niederrhein ===
| Pos | Team | Pld | W | D | L | GF | GA | GD | Pts | Promotion or relegation |
|---|---|---|---|---|---|---|---|---|---|---|
| 1 | SSVg Velbert (C, P) | 34 | 22 | 8 | 4 | 82 | 31 | +51 | 74 | Promotion to Regionalliga West |
| 2 | SpVg Schonnebeck | 34 | 22 | 6 | 6 | 108 | 39 | +69 | 72 | |
| 3 | Schwarz-Weiß Essen | 34 | 21 | 6 | 7 | 74 | 42 | +32 | 69 | |
| 4 | SC St. Tönis | 34 | 21 | 5 | 8 | 95 | 45 | +50 | 68 | |
| 5 | VfB Homberg | 34 | 19 | 5 | 10 | 67 | 46 | +21 | 62 | |
| 6 | VfB 03 Hilden | 34 | 17 | 9 | 8 | 65 | 43 | +22 | 60 | |
| 7 | FC Büderich | 34 | 16 | 5 | 13 | 79 | 74 | +5 | 53 | |
| 8 | SV Sonsbeck | 34 | 13 | 6 | 15 | 52 | 63 | −11 | 45 | |
| 9 | Germania Ratingen | 34 | 13 | 5 | 16 | 48 | 54 | −6 | 44 | |
| 10 | TSV Meerbusch | 34 | 11 | 10 | 13 | 63 | 63 | 0 | 43 | |
| 11 | SV Biemenhorst | 34 | 12 | 6 | 16 | 50 | 75 | −25 | 42 | |
| 12 | 1. FC Monheim | 34 | 10 | 8 | 16 | 55 | 64 | −9 | 38 | |
| 13 | 1. FC Kleve | 34 | 8 | 13 | 13 | 45 | 53 | −8 | 37 | |
| 14 | Sportfreunde Baumberg | 34 | 9 | 8 | 17 | 47 | 72 | −25 | 35 | |
| 15 | Union Nettetal (R) | 34 | 8 | 6 | 20 | 44 | 73 | −29 | 30 | Relegation |
| 16 | Sportfreunde Niederwenigern (R) | 34 | 6 | 11 | 17 | 43 | 70 | −27 | 29 | Relegation |
| 17 | Mülheimer FC 97 (R) | 34 | 7 | 7 | 20 | 45 | 88 | −43 | 28 | Relegation |
| 18 | TVD Velbert (R) | 34 | 6 | 6 | 22 | 41 | 108 | −67 | 24 | Relegation |

Source: Soccerway
(C) Champions; (P) Promoted; (R) Relegated

=== Niedersachsen ===
| Pos | Team | Pld | W | D | L | GF | GA | GD | Pts | Promotion, qualification or relegation |
|---|---|---|---|---|---|---|---|---|---|---|
| 1 | HSC Hannover (C, P) | 34 | 18 | 7 | 9 | 70 | 50 | +20 | 61 | Promotion to Regionalliga Nord |
| 2 | FSV Schöningen (O, P) | 34 | 16 | 12 | 6 | 55 | 37 | +18 | 60 | Play-off |
| 3 | Atlas Delmenhorst | 34 | 17 | 8 | 9 | 57 | 37 | +20 | 59 | |
| 4 | TuS Bersenbrück | 34 | 15 | 9 | 10 | 62 | 65 | −3 | 54 | |
| 5 | SC Spelle-Venhaus | 34 | 15 | 6 | 13 | 59 | 49 | +10 | 51 | |
| 6 | Heeslinger SC | 34 | 15 | 6 | 13 | 64 | 55 | +9 | 51 | |
| 7 | SV Meppen II | 34 | 14 | 8 | 12 | 50 | 53 | −3 | 50 | |
| 8 | Borussia Hildesheim | 34 | 13 | 10 | 11 | 55 | 45 | +10 | 49 | |
| 9 | Schwarz-Weiß Rehden | 34 | 13 | 10 | 11 | 51 | 45 | +6 | 49 | |
| 10 | Lupo Martini Wolfsburg | 34 | 13 | 6 | 15 | 60 | 62 | −2 | 45 | |
| 11 | SV Wilhelmshaven | 34 | 12 | 9 | 13 | 46 | 51 | −5 | 45 | |
| 12 | Germania Egestorf | 34 | 11 | 10 | 13 | 32 | 40 | −8 | 43 | |
| 13 | Eintracht Braunschweig II | 34 | 11 | 8 | 15 | 51 | 59 | −8 | 41 | |
| 14 | Verden 04 | 34 | 9 | 13 | 12 | 60 | 67 | −7 | 40 | |
| 15 | SSV Vorsfelde (R) | 34 | 11 | 7 | 16 | 40 | 52 | −12 | 40 | Relegation |
| 16 | Eintracht Celle (R) | 34 | 10 | 6 | 18 | 43 | 61 | −18 | 36 | Relegation |
| 17 | Arminia Hannover (R) | 34 | 9 | 8 | 17 | 36 | 46 | −10 | 35 | Relegation |
| 18 | VfL Oldenburg (R) | 34 | 7 | 11 | 16 | 33 | 50 | −17 | 32 | Relegation |

Source: Soccerway
(C) Champions; (O) Play-off winners; (P) Promoted; (R) Relegated

=== Nordost-Nord ===
| Pos | Team | Pld | W | D | L | GF | GA | GD | Pts | Promotion or relegation |
|---|---|---|---|---|---|---|---|---|---|---|
| 1 | BFC Preussen (C, P) | 30 | 20 | 7 | 3 | 77 | 22 | +55 | 67 | Promotion to Regionalliga Nordost |
| 2 | Lichtenberg 47 | 30 | 20 | 6 | 4 | 88 | 28 | +60 | 66 | |
| 3 | Eintracht Mahlsdorf | 30 | 20 | 6 | 4 | 82 | 32 | +50 | 66 | |
| 4 | Hansa Rostock II | 30 | 19 | 3 | 8 | 96 | 46 | +50 | 60 | |
| 5 | Makkabi Berlin | 30 | 13 | 9 | 8 | 60 | 41 | +19 | 48 | |
| 6 | Sparta Lichtenberg | 30 | 14 | 6 | 10 | 76 | 66 | +10 | 48 | |
| 7 | Neustrelitz | 30 | 13 | 6 | 11 | 56 | 48 | +8 | 45 | |
| 8 | Berliner AK 07 | 30 | 12 | 8 | 10 | 50 | 37 | +13 | 44 | |
| 9 | Tennis Borussia Berlin | 30 | 13 | 3 | 14 | 74 | 71 | +3 | 42 | |
| 10 | Tasmania Berlin | 30 | 12 | 4 | 14 | 51 | 51 | 0 | 40 | |
| 11 | Dynamo Schwerin | 30 | 11 | 3 | 16 | 51 | 68 | −17 | 36 | |
| 12 | Anker Wismar | 30 | 10 | 5 | 15 | 55 | 68 | −13 | 35 | |
| 13 | Optik Rathenow | 30 | 7 | 9 | 14 | 46 | 57 | −11 | 30 | |
| 14 | SC Staaken (O) | 30 | 9 | 2 | 19 | 48 | 73 | −25 | 29 | Qualification for relegation play-off |
| 15 | SV Grün-Weiß Ahrensfelde (R) | 30 | 5 | 7 | 18 | 46 | 75 | −29 | 22 | Relegation |
| 16 | Rostocker FC (R) | 30 | 0 | 0 | 30 | 10 | 183 | −173 | 0 | Relegation |

Source: Soccerway
(C) Champions; (O) Play-off winners; (P) Promoted; (R) Relegated

=== Nordost-Süd ===
| Pos | Team | Pld | W | D | L | GF | GA | GD | Pts | Promotion or relegation |
|---|---|---|---|---|---|---|---|---|---|---|
| 1 | 1. FC Magdeburg II (C, P) | 30 | 23 | 6 | 1 | 88 | 25 | +63 | 75 | Promotion to Regionalliga Nordost |
| 2 | VfB Krieschow | 30 | 16 | 7 | 7 | 75 | 42 | +33 | 55 | |
| 3 | Halle 1896 | 30 | 16 | 7 | 7 | 65 | 42 | +23 | 55 | |
| 4 | Eintracht Stahnsdorf | 30 | 17 | 3 | 10 | 67 | 37 | +30 | 54 | |
| 5 | VfB Auerbach | 30 | 14 | 9 | 7 | 56 | 41 | +15 | 51 | |
| 6 | SC Freital | 30 | 15 | 4 | 11 | 54 | 47 | +7 | 49 | |
| 7 | Germania Halberstadt | 30 | 14 | 6 | 10 | 62 | 55 | +7 | 48 | |
| 8 | Bischofswerdaer FV 08 | 30 | 12 | 10 | 8 | 38 | 40 | −2 | 46 | |
| 9 | Budissa Bautzen | 30 | 10 | 8 | 12 | 57 | 58 | −1 | 38 | |
| 10 | Einheit Wernigerode | 30 | 10 | 6 | 14 | 57 | 72 | −15 | 36 | |
| 11 | Union Sandersdorf | 30 | 10 | 5 | 15 | 36 | 49 | −13 | 35 | |
| 12 | FC Grimma | 30 | 9 | 7 | 14 | 50 | 65 | −15 | 34 | |
| 13 | Einheit Rudolstadt | 30 | 8 | 7 | 15 | 50 | 58 | −8 | 31 | |
| 14 | Wismut Gera (R) | 30 | 9 | 4 | 17 | 50 | 78 | −28 | 31 | Qualification for relegation play-off |
| 15 | Blau-Weiß Zorbau (R) | 30 | 6 | 7 | 17 | 40 | 79 | −39 | 25 | Relegation |
| 16 | Ludwigsfelder FC (R) | 30 | 1 | 4 | 25 | 17 | 74 | −57 | 7 | Relegation |

Source: Soccerway
(C) Champions; (P) Promoted; (R) Relegated

=== Rheinland-Pfalz/Saar ===
| Pos | Team | Pld | W | D | L | GF | GA | GD | Pts | Qualification |
|---|---|---|---|---|---|---|---|---|---|---|
| 1 | Schott Mainz (C, P) | 34 | 29 | 4 | 1 | 117 | 24 | +93 | 91 | Promotion to Regionalliga Südwest |
| 2 | 1. FC Kaiserslautern II | 34 | 25 | 5 | 4 | 121 | 45 | +76 | 80 | Play-off |
| 3 | FK Pirmasens | 34 | 23 | 9 | 2 | 92 | 27 | +65 | 78 | |
| 4 | TuS Koblenz | 34 | 23 | 2 | 9 | 70 | 38 | +32 | 71 | |
| 5 | Wormatia Worms | 34 | 16 | 7 | 11 | 66 | 59 | +7 | 55 | |
| 6 | SV Gonsenheim | 34 | 14 | 9 | 11 | 71 | 58 | +13 | 51 | |
| 7 | Engers 07 | 34 | 14 | 5 | 15 | 63 | 66 | −3 | 47 | |
| 8 | Rot-Weiß Koblenz | 34 | 12 | 9 | 13 | 56 | 57 | −1 | 45 | |
| 9 | Arminia Ludwigshafen | 34 | 13 | 5 | 16 | 67 | 63 | +4 | 44 | |
| 10 | FC Karbach | 34 | 10 | 8 | 16 | 45 | 63 | −18 | 38 | |
| 11 | FV 07 Diefflen | 34 | 9 | 9 | 16 | 61 | 79 | −18 | 36 | |
| 12 | SC Idar-Oberstein | 34 | 10 | 6 | 18 | 42 | 69 | −27 | 36 | |
| 13 | Eisbachtaler Sportfreunde | 34 | 9 | 8 | 17 | 63 | 84 | −21 | 35 | |
| 14 | FV Eppelborn | 34 | 10 | 4 | 20 | 48 | 97 | −49 | 34 | |
| 15 | SV Auersmacher | 34 | 9 | 6 | 19 | 57 | 74 | −17 | 33 | |
| 16 | TuS Mechtersheim (R) | 34 | 8 | 9 | 17 | 39 | 74 | −35 | 33 | Relegation |
| 17 | Viktoria Herxheim (R) | 34 | 10 | 3 | 21 | 45 | 89 | −44 | 33 | Relegation |
| 18 | SV Morlautern (R) | 34 | 6 | 4 | 24 | 49 | 106 | −57 | 22 | Relegation |

Updated to match(es) played on 31 May 2025. Source: Soccerway
(C) Champions; (P) Promoted; (R) Relegated

=== Schleswig-Holstein ===
| Pos | Team | Pld | W | D | L | GF | GA | GD | Pts | Qualification or relegation |
|---|---|---|---|---|---|---|---|---|---|---|
| 1 | Kilia Kiel (C) | 30 | 22 | 8 | 0 | 109 | 43 | +66 | 74 | |
| 2 | Heider SV | 30 | 21 | 5 | 4 | 90 | 41 | +49 | 68 | Play-off |
| 3 | Union Neumünster | 30 | 19 | 5 | 6 | 83 | 36 | +47 | 62 | |
| 4 | SV Eichede | 30 | 17 | 8 | 5 | 64 | 27 | +37 | 59 | |
| 5 | TSV Nordmark Satrup | 30 | 11 | 8 | 11 | 62 | 52 | +10 | 41 | |
| 6 | Preußen Reinfeld | 30 | 11 | 8 | 11 | 54 | 56 | −2 | 41 | |
| 7 | MTSV Hohenwestedt | 30 | 11 | 7 | 12 | 50 | 64 | −14 | 40 | |
| 8 | Oldenburger SV | 30 | 10 | 8 | 12 | 66 | 68 | −2 | 38 | |
| 9 | Eutiner SV 1908 | 30 | 10 | 7 | 13 | 49 | 54 | −5 | 37 | |
| 10 | TuS Rotenhof | 30 | 10 | 5 | 15 | 58 | 68 | −10 | 35 | |
| 11 | VfR Neumünster | 30 | 9 | 8 | 13 | 55 | 67 | −12 | 35 | |
| 12 | VfB Lübeck II (R) | 30 | 9 | 6 | 15 | 51 | 68 | −17 | 33 | Relegation |
| 13 | Eckernförder SV (R) | 30 | 8 | 8 | 14 | 53 | 68 | −15 | 32 | Relegation |
| 14 | TSB Flensburg (R) | 30 | 8 | 7 | 15 | 51 | 70 | −19 | 31 | Relegation |
| 15 | Eidertal Molfsee (R) | 30 | 7 | 6 | 17 | 44 | 85 | −41 | 27 | Relegation |
| 16 | FC Dornbreite Lübeck (R) | 30 | 3 | 4 | 23 | 32 | 104 | −72 | 13 | Relegation |

Source: Soccerway
(C) Champions; (R) Relegated

=== Westfalen ===
| Pos | Team | Pld | W | D | L | GF | GA | GD | Pts | Promotion, qualification or relegation |
|---|---|---|---|---|---|---|---|---|---|---|
| 1 | Sportfreunde Siegen (C, P) | 34 | 23 | 9 | 2 | 70 | 25 | +45 | 78 | Promotion to Regionalliga West |
| 2 | VfL Bochum II (P) | 34 | 21 | 8 | 5 | 79 | 31 | +48 | 71 | Promotion to Regionalliga West |
| 3 | ASC 09 Dortmund | 34 | 19 | 5 | 10 | 81 | 53 | +28 | 62 | |
| 4 | Westfalia Rhynern | 34 | 16 | 4 | 14 | 58 | 46 | +12 | 52 | |
| 5 | Eintracht Rheine | 34 | 15 | 5 | 14 | 56 | 46 | +10 | 50 | |
| 6 | SV Schermbeck | 34 | 14 | 8 | 12 | 62 | 59 | +3 | 50 | |
| 7 | Lippstadt 08 | 34 | 15 | 5 | 14 | 54 | 51 | +3 | 50 | |
| 8 | Wattenscheid 09 | 34 | 14 | 7 | 13 | 50 | 47 | +3 | 49 | |
| 9 | Preußen Münster II | 34 | 14 | 6 | 14 | 65 | 66 | −1 | 48 | |
| 10 | 1. FC Gievenbeck | 34 | 11 | 11 | 12 | 51 | 49 | +2 | 44 | |
| 11 | SpVgg Vreden | 34 | 12 | 7 | 15 | 52 | 56 | −4 | 43 | |
| 12 | Verl II | 34 | 12 | 7 | 15 | 47 | 51 | −4 | 43 | |
| 13 | Rot Weiss Ahlen | 34 | 11 | 9 | 14 | 56 | 69 | −13 | 42 | |
| 14 | SG Finnentrop/Bamenohl | 34 | 12 | 5 | 17 | 45 | 68 | −23 | 41 | |
| 15 | Victoria Clarholz | 34 | 10 | 9 | 15 | 40 | 47 | −7 | 39 | |
| 16 | TuS Ennepetal | 34 | 10 | 7 | 17 | 52 | 75 | −23 | 37 | |
| 17 | SpVgg Erkenschwick | 34 | 7 | 9 | 18 | 41 | 68 | −27 | 30 | |
| 18 | Concordia Wiemelhausen (R) | 34 | 7 | 5 | 22 | 49 | 101 | −52 | 26 | Relegation |
| 19 | TuS Bövinghausen (D, R) | 0 | 0 | 0 | 0 | 0 | 0 | 0 | 0 (Note: On 26 March 2025, it was announced that TuS Bövinghausen had officially folded, and their record of Pld23 W2 D1 L20 GF22 GA92 was expunged.) | Club folded |

Source: Soccerway
(C) Champions; (D) Disqualified; (P) Promoted; (R) Relegated

=== Promotion Round - Nord ===
| Pos | Team | Pld | W | D | L | GF | GA | GD | Pts | Promotion, qualification or relegation |
|---|---|---|---|---|---|---|---|---|---|---|
| 1 | FSV Schöningen (P) | 3 | 2 | 0 | 1 | 6 | 3 | +3 | 6 | Promotion to Regionalliga Nord |
| 2 | Altona 93 (P) | 3 | 1 | 1 | 1 | 5 | 4 | +1 | 4 | Promotion to Regionalliga Nord |
| 3 | Heider SV | 3 | 1 | 1 | 1 | 3 | 3 | 0 | 4 | |
| 4 | SV Hemelingen | 3 | 0 | 2 | 1 | 2 | 6 | −4 | 2 | |

Source: Soccerway
(P) Promoted

=== Promotion Round - Südwest ===
| Pos | Team | Pld | W | D | L | GF | GA | GD | Pts | Promotion, qualification or relegation |
|---|---|---|---|---|---|---|---|---|---|---|
| 1 | TSG Balingen (P) | 2 | 1 | 1 | 0 | 4 | 3 | +1 | 4 | Promotion to Regionalliga Südwest |
| 2 | Türk Gücü Friedberg | 2 | 1 | 0 | 1 | 8 | 3 | +5 | 3 | |
| 3 | 1. FC Kaiserslautern II | 2 | 0 | 1 | 1 | 1 | 7 | −6 | 1 | |

Source: Soccerway
(P) Promoted

=== Relegation play-off - Nordost ===
| Team 1 | Agg. | Team 2 | 1st leg | 2nd leg |
|---|---|---|---|---|
| BSG Wismut Gera | 1–4 | SC Staaken | 1–2 | 0–2 |
