= Martin Harnik =

Footballer (born 1987)

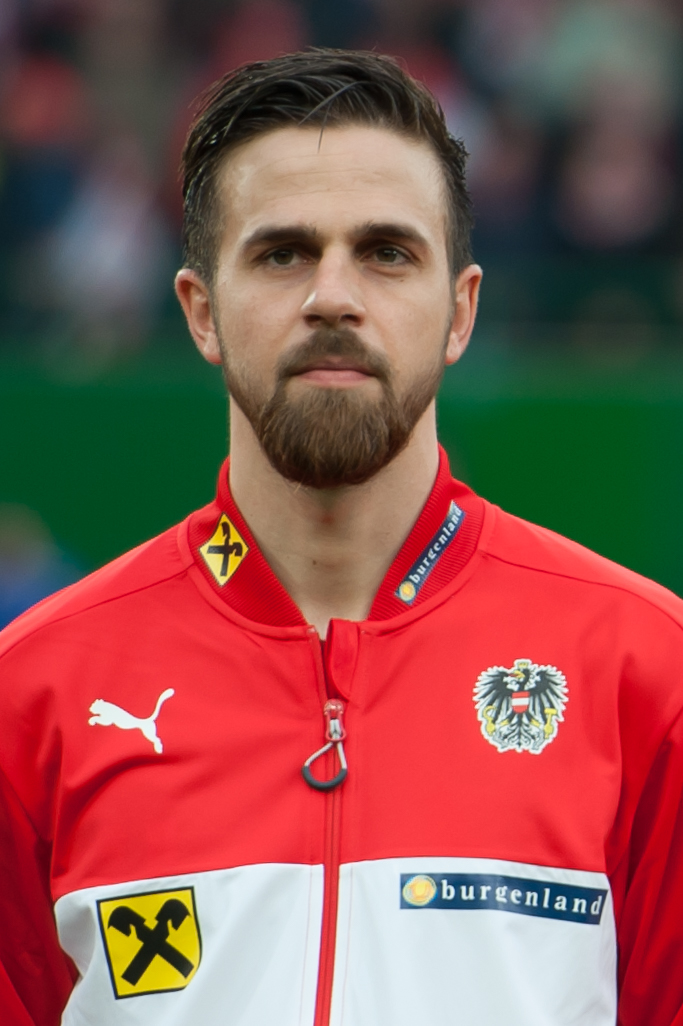
- Harnik with Austria in 2016

Personal information
- Full name: Martin Harnik
- Date of birth: 10 June 1987 (age 39)
- Place of birth: Hamburg, West Germany
- Height: 1.85 m (6 ft 1 in)
- Positions: Forward; right winger

Team information
- Current team: HT 16
- Number: 7

Youth career
- 1992–2005: SC Vier-und Marschlande

Senior career*
Years	Team	Apps	(Gls)
2005–2006	SC Vier-und Marschlande	10	(14)
2006–2009	Werder Bremen II	48	(13)
2007–2010	Werder Bremen	17	(1)
2009–2010	→ Fortuna Düsseldorf (loan)	30	(13)
2010–2016	VfB Stuttgart	173	(52)
2016–2018	Hannover 96	60	(26)
2018–2020	Werder Bremen	20	(4)
2019–2020	→ Hamburger SV (loan)	23	(3)
2020–2026	TuS Dassendorf	120	(144)
2026–	HT 16	5	(6)

International career
2006	Austria U19	11	(2)
2006–2007	Austria U20	7	(0)
2007–2009	Austria U21	3	(1)
2007–2017	Austria	68	(15)
- * Club domestic league appearances and goals as of 25 June 2026

Martin Harnik (born 10 June 1987) is a professional footballer who plays for HT 16. Born in Germany, he has represented the Austria national team. He plays as a forward or as a right winger.

== Family ==
Harnik was born in Hamburg in 1987, the youngest of three children who were raised in the Hamburg district of Kirchwerder. His father is from Styria in Austria, and his mother is from Hamburg.

== Club career ==
=== Early career ===
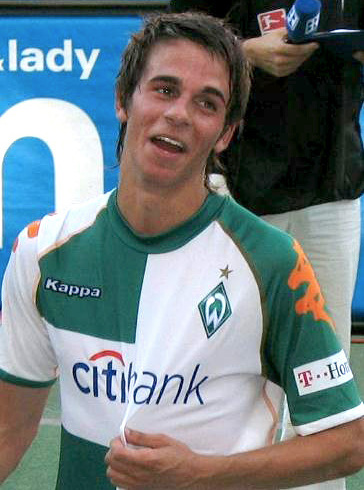
Harnik with Werder Bremen in 2007

Harnik started playing football in 1992 at SC Vier- und Marschlande. In early 2006, he joined the second team of Werder Bremen, playing in the third tier Regionalliga.

Due to a broken metatarsal bone, Harnik missed almost all of the first half of 2007. At the start of the 2007–08 season, the forward was promoted to the Bundesliga side of Werder Bremen, signing a contract until 2010.

On 15 August 2007, the 20-year-old made his debut for the professional team against Dinamo Zagreb, in the first leg of the third Champions League Qualification round (2–1).

His Bundesliga debut came ten days later, in a game against 1. FC Nürnberg (1–0). Being fielded in the 61st minute, he scored the winning goal for his side in the 69th minute. On 24 August 2009, it was announced that Harnik was able to leave his club SV Werder Bremen as a free agent, and six days later was loaned out to Fortuna Düsseldorf.

After one season at the 2. Bundesliga side, in which he was Fortuna's topscorer, with the Rhinelanders narrowly missing promotion to the Bundesliga, Harnik announced on 26 April 2010 that he would leave Düsseldorf.

=== VfB Stuttgart ===
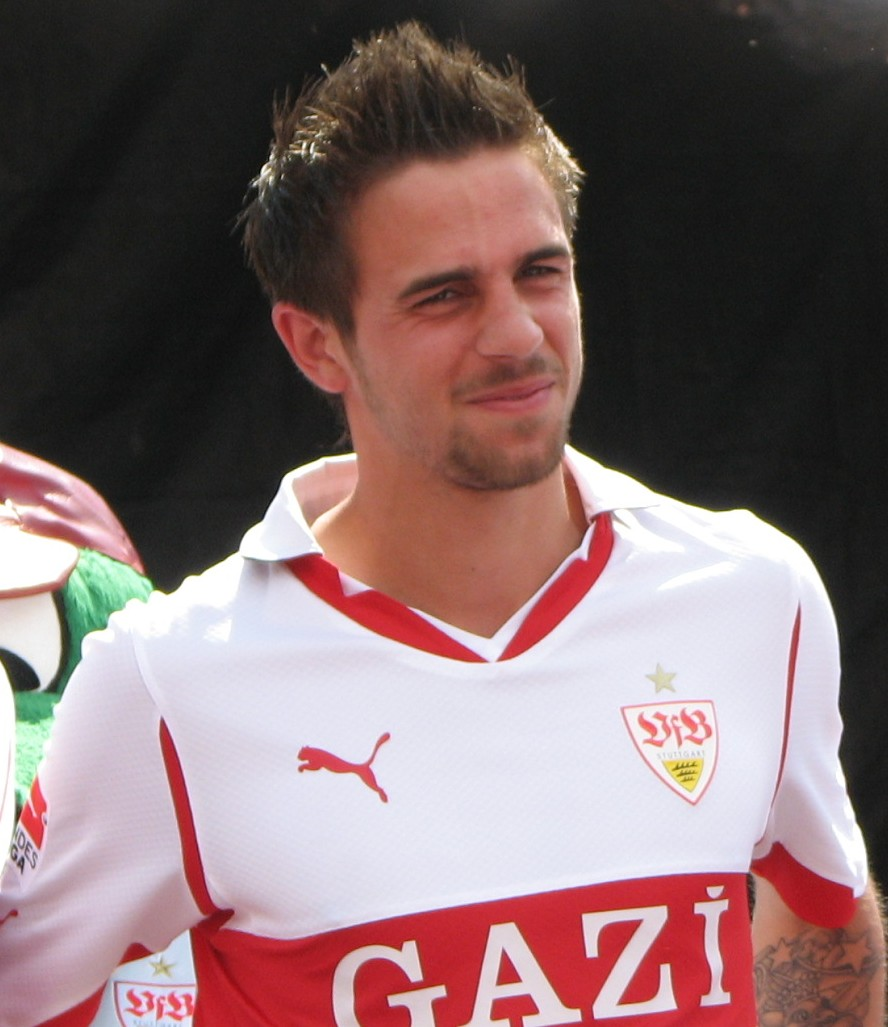
Harnik with VfB Stuttgart in 2010

In July 2010, Harnik moved to VfB Stuttgart. Harnik began playing for Stuttgart as a joker, but manager Bruno Labbadia brought him into the regular starting squad as the club was fighting relegation in the 2010–11 Bundesliga season. In the first fixture of his second season with the club, Harnik scored the second goal of a 3–0 home win over Schalke. Harnik propelled his side to victory with a brace against SC Freiburg on 16 September 2011.

In the 2011–12 season, Harnik was Stuttgart's top scorer with 17 goals and eight assists. On 6 January 2012, he extended his contract with VfB Stuttgart until June 2016. Harnik netted twice in the final of the DFB-Pokal on 1 June 2013, but Stuttgart fell 3–2 to Bayern Munich and the Bavarians secured an unprecedented league, cup and European cup treble.

=== Hannover 96 ===
In July 2016, Harnik joined Hannover 96. He scored 21 goals in 33 appearances during the 2016–17 season. He scored 11 goals in 32 appearances during the 2017–18 season.

=== Werder Bremen ===
In May 2018, Werder Bremen announced Harnik would return to the club for the 2018–19 season. Media reported he signed a contract until 2021 and estimated the transfer fee paid to Hannover 96 at around €2 million.

On 2 September 2019, Hamburger SV announced the signing of Harnik on a season-long loan deal.

In October 2020, after Harnik's return from loan, he agreed the termination of his contract with Werder Bremen.

=== TuS Dassendorf ===
Harnik moved down to fifth-division TuS Dassendorf on 7 October 2020, German transfer deadline day. This was because he lived near the club and wanted to play on the same team as his future brother-in-law, Mattia Maggio.

== International career ==
Harnik, who also was eligible for Germany, opted to play for Austria, although he has never lived there, after having been nominated for the youth national teams of the ÖFB, not those of the German Football Association. His debut came in a match against the Czech Republic in the Ernst Happel Stadium in Vienna on 22 August 2007 (1–1). After being on the pitch for just six minutes, he scored the equaliser in the 78th minute. He was called up to Austria's squad for the Euro 2008. Harnik played in all three group games but the co-hosts were eliminated in the group stage. On 2 September 2011, Harnik scored against Germany in a 6–2 loss at the Veltins-Arena in Gelsenkirchen. The win meant that Harnik's nation of birth secured qualification to Euro 2012. He represented the national team at 2016 UEFA Euro.

== Career statistics ==
=== Club ===
As of match played 15 May 2026

Appearances and goals by club, season and competition
Club	Season	League			Cup		Continental		Total		Ref.
Club	Season	Division	Apps	Goals	Apps	Goals	Apps	Goals	Apps	Goals	Ref.
SC Vier-und Marschlande	2005–06	Landesliga Hamburg-Hansa	10	14	—		—		10	14	
Werder Bremen II	2005–06	Regionalliga Nord	13	2	—		—		13	2	
Werder Bremen II	2006–07	Regionalliga Nord	21	7	—		—		21	7	
Werder Bremen II	2007–08	Regionalliga Nord	12	3	3	3	—		15	6	
Werder Bremen II	2008–09	3. Liga	8	1	—		—		8	1	
Werder Bremen II	Total		54	13	3	3	—		67	30	—
Werder Bremen	2007–08	Bundesliga	9	1	0	0	5 (Note: Appearances in UEFA Champions League and UEFA Cup.)	0	14	1	
Werder Bremen	2008–09	Bundesliga	8	0	0	0	1 (Note: Appearances in UEFA Cup.)	0	9	0	
Werder Bremen	Total		17	1	0	0	6	0	23	1	—
Fortuna Düsseldorf (loan)	2009–10	2. Bundesliga	30	13	0	0	—		30	13	
VfB Stuttgart	2010–11	Bundesliga	32	9	2	3	(Note: Appearances in UEFA Europa League.)	5	44	17	
VfB Stuttgart	2011–12	Bundesliga	34	17	4	0	—		38	17	
VfB Stuttgart	2012–13	Bundesliga	30	6	5	5	12	2	47	13	
VfB Stuttgart	2013–14	Bundesliga	30	10	2	0	3	0	35	10	
VfB Stuttgart	2014–15	Bundesliga	28	9	1	0	—		29	9	
VfB Stuttgart	2015–16	Bundesliga	19	2	2	1	—		21	3	
VfB Stuttgart	Total		173	52	16	9	25	7	214	68	—
Hannover 96	2016–17	2. Bundesliga	30	17	3	4	—		33	21	
Hannover 96	2017–18	Bundesliga	30	9	2	2	—		32	11	
Hannover 96	Total		60	26	5	6	—		65	32	—
Werder Bremen	2018–19	Bundesliga	18	4	4	3	—		22	7	
Werder Bremen	2019–20	Bundesliga	2	0	0	0	—		2	0	
Hamburger SV (loan)	2019–20	2. Bundesliga	23	3	0	0	—		23	3	
Hamburger SV (loan)	Total		43	7	4	3	—		47	10	—
TuS Dassendorf	2020–21	Oberliga Hamburg	2	1	0	0	—		2	1	
TuS Dassendorf	2021–22	Oberliga Hamburg	22	31	4	5	—		26	36	
TuS Dassendorf	2022–23	Oberliga Hamburg	31	46	2	1	—		32	47	
TuS Dassendorf	2023–24	Oberliga Hamburg	28	32	2	5	—		30	37	
TuS Dassendorf	2024–25	Oberliga Hamburg	20	23	2	3	—		22	26	
TuS Dassendorf	2025–26	Oberliga Hamburg	16	11	1	0	—		17	11	
TuS Dassendorf	Total		119	144	11	14	—		129	158	—
Career total			506	271	39	35	31	7	545	299	—

=== International goals ===
Scores and results list Austria's goal tally first, score column indicates score after each Harnik goal.

List of international goals scored by Martin Harnik
No.	Date	Venue	Opponent	Score	Result	Competition
1	22 August 2007	Ernst-Happel-Stadion, Vienna	Czech Republic	1–1	1–1	Friendly
2	30 May 2008	UPC-Arena, Graz	Malta	5–1	5–1	Friendly
3	12 October 2010	King Baudouin Stadium, Brussels	Belgium	4–4	4–4	UEFA Euro 2012 qualifying
4.	7 June 2011	UPC-Arena, Graz	Latvia	2–1	3–1	Friendly
5	7 June 2011	UPC-Arena, Graz	Latvia	3–1	3–1	Friendly
6	2 September 2011	Veltins-Arena, Gelsenkirchen	Germany	2–4	2–6	UEFA Euro 2012 qualifying
7	29 February 2012	Wörthersee-Stadion, Klagenfurt	Finland	2–0	3–1	Friendly
8	16 October 2012	Ernst-Happel-Stadion, Vienna	Kazakhstan	4–0	4–0	2014 FIFA World Cup qualifying
9	26 March 2013	Aviva Stadium, Dublin	Republic of Ireland	1–0	2–2	2014 FIFA World Cup qualifying
10	11 October 2013	Friends Arena, Solna	Sweden	1–0	1–2	2014 FIFA World Cup qualifying
11	27 March 2015	Rheinpark Stadion, Vaduz	Liechtenstein	1–0	5–0	UEFA Euro 2016 qualifying
12	8 September 2015	Friends Arena, Solna	Sweden	2–0	1–4	UEFA Euro 2016 qualifying
13	8 September 2015	Friends Arena, Solna	Sweden	4–0	1–4	UEFA Euro 2016 qualifying
14	26 March 2016	Ernst-Happel-Stadion, Vienna	Albania	2–0	2–1	Friendly
15	24 March 2017	Ernst-Happel-Stadion, Vienna	Moldova	2–0	2–0	2018 FIFA World Cup qualification

== Honours ==
Werder Bremen

- DFB-Pokal: 2008–09
- UEFA Cup: runner-up 2008–09

VfB Stuttgart

- DFB-Pokal: runner-up 2012–13

TuS Dassendorf

- Oberliga Hamburg: 2021–22; runner-up 2022–23, 2023–24, 2024–25
