= Jörn Großkopf =

German footballer and manager

Personal information
- Full name: Jörn Großkopf
- Date of birth: 29 August 1966 (age 60)
- Place of birth: Hamburg, West Germany
- Height: 1.75 m (5 ft 9 in)
- Position: Striker

Senior career*
Years	Team	Apps	(Gls)
1988–1991	FC St. Pauli	30	(2)
–2002	SC Union 03 Altona		
2002–2004	TSV Sasel		
2004–2005	Niendorfer TSV		

Managerial career
- 2005–2007: Niendorfer TSV
- 2007–2009: FC St. Pauli U-19
- 2009–2013: FC St. Pauli II
- 2013: Hessen Kassel
- 2014–2016: SC Poppenbüttel (assistant)
- 2016: KFC Uerdingen 05
- 2016: SV Eichede
- 2017–2018: Wedeler TSV
- 2018–2019: HEBC Hamburg
- 2019–2022: FC Türkiye Wilhelmsburg
- 2022–2024: FC Alsterbrüder
- 2024–2025: Eintracht Norderstedt U-23
- 2025–2026: Eintracht Norderstedt
- * Club domestic league appearances and goals

Jörn Großkopf (born 29 August 1966 is a German former football player and manager. He was most recently in charge of Eintracht Norderstedt.

== Playing career ==
Großkopf, nicknamed "Krümel", was born in Hamburg. He made his Bundesliga footballing debut for FC St. Pauli on 22 October 1988 as a last-minute substitute in a 1–0 home win over Borussia Dortmund. He went on to score two goals in 30 appearances for the Hamburg-based team.

== Managerial career ==
Sixteen years later, Großkopf returned to Millerntor to take over the reins of FC St. Pauli's under-19 youth team and on 15 January 2009, took over as head coach of FC St. Pauli's reserve team, helping them gain promotion from the Oberliga Hamburg to the Regionalliga Nord in his first season. In July 2013 he was appointed as manager of Hessen Kassel. He was sacked on 12 November 2013. In December 2014 he became assistant manager at SC Poppenbüttel.

In March 2016 he became new manager of KFC Uerdingen 05 on a short-term contract. Because he failed to get the club promoted to the Regionalliga his contract was not renewed, when it expired in May 2016.

Despite having an agreement to become new Wedeler TSV manager he chose an offer from SV Eichede and was presented as manager of that club on 2 July 2016. He was sacked by Eichede in November following a terrible start to the season. In January 2017 he returned to Wedeler TSV as new manager. He left the club by mutual consent on 16 April 2018 following 6 defeats in 7 games.

On 30 June 2018, Großkopf was named new manager of HEBC Hamburg. In June 2019 he became new manager of FC Türkiye Wilhelmsburg. In the summer of 2022 he switched from Wilhelmburg to FC Alsterbrüder.

In September 2024, he became manager of the youth team of Eintracht Norderstedt. On 8 December 2025, the club promoted him to the job of manager of the senior team. He left the club in the summer of 2026.
