= Aferdita Kameraj =

German footballer (born 1984)

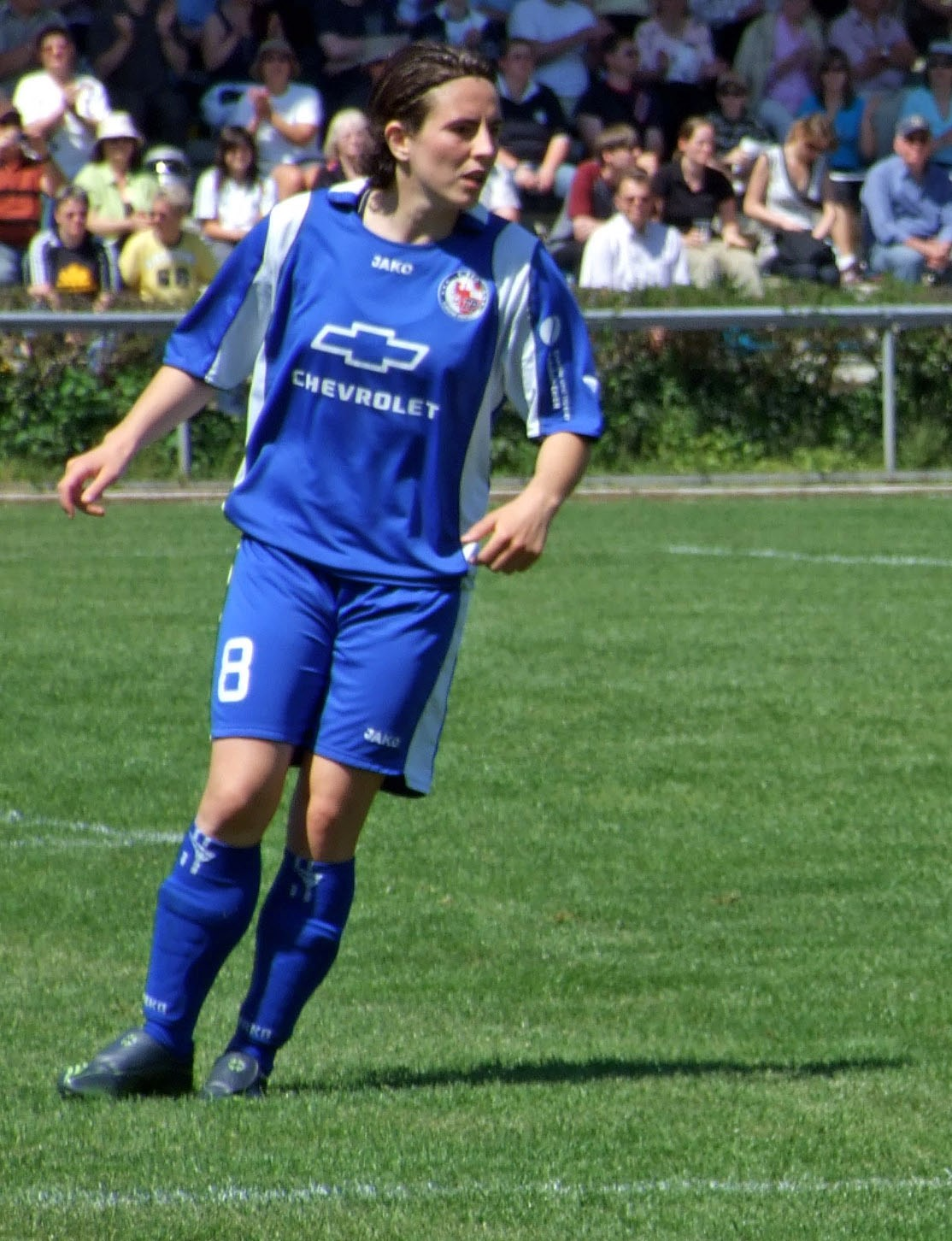
- Kameraj with Turbine Potsdam in 2008

Personal information
- Date of birth: 5 June 1984 (age 42)
- Place of birth: Deçan, SAP Kosovo, Yugoslavia
- Height: 1.71 m (5 ft 7 in)
- Positions: Defender; midfielder

Youth career
- HEBC Hamburg
- FTSV Altenwerder

Senior career*
Years	Team	Apps	(Gls)
2000–2006	Hamburger SV	84	(13)
2006–2008	Turbine Potsdam	42	(4)
2008–2012	Hamburger SV	71	(16)
2012–2014	Cloppenburg	10	(4)
Total		207	(37)

International career
2002–2003	Germany U19	13	(0)
2004–2006	Germany U21	12	(0)
2007	Germany U23	3	(1)
- * Club domestic league appearances and goals

Aferdita Kameraj (born 5 June 1984) is a German former footballer who plays as a defender or midfielder for Hamburger SV, Turbine Potsdam and Cloppenburg. She represented Germany internationally at youth levels U19, U21 and U23.

== Career ==
Kameraj was born in Kosovo, Yugoslavia. She moved to Hamburg with her family when she was a little child. Her career began at the HEBC Hamburg. She then moved to FTSV Altenwerder before joining the Hamburger SV in 2000. She won promotion to the Frauen-Bundesliga in 2001 and 2003 and played the German Cup final in 2002 with the team.

In 2006 Kameraj signed for Turbine Potsdam, with which she also played the UEFA Women's Cup. Two years later she returned to Hamburger SV, for which she played until the team withdrew from the Bundesliga for financial reasons in 2012. She then moved to Cloppenburg in the second tier.

She made several appearances for Germany on the junior level, playing the 2004 U19 European Championship.
