= 2025–26 Verbandspokal =

Tournament details
- Country: Germany
- Teams: 44

The 2025–26 Verbandspokal (English: 2025–26 Association Cup) consisted of twenty-one regional cup competitions, the Verbandspokale, the qualifying competition for the 2026–27 DFB-Pokal, the German Cup.

All clubs from the 3. Liga and below could enter the regional Verbandspokale, subject to the rules and regulations of each region. Clubs from the Bundesliga and 2. Bundesliga did not enter but were instead directly qualified for the first round of the DFB-Pokal. Reserve teams were not permitted to take part in the DFB-Pokal or the Verbandspokale. The precise rules of each regional Verbandspokal were laid down by the regional football association organising it.

All twenty-one winners qualified for the first round of the German Cup in the following season. Three additional clubs also qualified for the first round of the German Cup, these being from the three largest state associations, Bavaria, Westphalia and Lower Saxony. The Lower Saxony Cup was split into two paths, one for teams from the 3. Liga and the Regionalliga Nord and one for the teams from lower leagues. The winners of both paths qualified for the DFB-Pokal. In Bavaria the best-placed non-reserve Regionalliga Bayern team qualified for the DFB-Pokal while in Westphalia the spot alternated between the Oberliga Westfalen champion and best-placed Westphalian team from the Regionalliga West. This year, the Oberliga Westfalen champion qualified.

The finals of the Verbandspokal competitions was played on the Amateurs' Final Day (German: Finaltag der Amateure), on 23 May 2026.

== Competitions ==
The finals of the 2025–26 Verbandspokal competitions (winners listed in bold):

Cup	Date	Location	Team 1	Result	Team 2	Report
Baden Cup (2025–26 season)	23 May 2026	Mannheim	VfR Mannheim	0–3	**Waldhof Mannheim**	Report
Bavarian Cup (Note: As one of the three largest regional associations, Bavaria gets an additional DFB-Pokal berth, which goes to the best non-reserve team of the Regionalliga Bayern.) (2025–26 season)	23 May 2026	Würzburg	**Würzburger Kickers**	1–1 (4–2 p)	1860 Munich	Report
Berlin Cup (2025–26 season)	23 May 2026	Berlin	**VSG Altglienicke**	2–1	BFC Dynamo	Report
Brandenburg Cup (2025–26 season)	23 May 2026	Cottbus	Energie Cottbus	1–2	**VfB Krieschow**	Report
Bremen Cup (2025–26 season)	23 May 2026	Bremen	**SV Hemelingen**	2–1	Leher TS	Report
Hamburg Cup (2025–26 season)	23 May 2026	Hamburg	Vorwärts-Wacker Billstedt	1–5	**Hamburg-Eimsbütteler BC**	Report
Hessian Cup (2025–26 season)	23 May 2026	Offenbach	Barockstadt Fulda-Lehnerz	1–2	**Wehen Wiesbaden**	Report
Lower Rhine Cup (2025–26 season)	23 May 2026	Duisburg	SC St. Tönis	1–4	**MSV Duisburg**	Report
Lower Saxony Cup (Note: As one of the three largest regional associations, Lower Saxony gets an additional DFB-Pokal berth, which goes to the winner of the second cup path.) (2025–26 season (3. Liga / Regionalliga)) (2025–26 season (amateurs))	24 May 2026	Barsinghausen	**SSV Jeddeloh**	3–0	SV Drochtersen/Assel	Report
Lower Saxony Cup (2025–26 season (3. Liga / Regionalliga)) (2025–26 season (amateurs))	23 May 2026	Barsinghausen	TuS Bersenbrück	3–3 (a.e.t.) (9–10 p)	**Lüneburger SK Hansa**	Report
Mecklenburg-Vorpommern Cup (2025–26 season)	23 May 2026	Greifswald	SV Pastow	0–3	**Hansa Rostock**	Report
Middle Rhine Cup (2025–26 season)	23 May 2026	Cologne	Fortuna Köln	0–0 (a.e.t.) (5–6 p)	**Viktoria Köln**	Report
Rhineland Cup (2025–26 season)	23 May 2026	Trier	TuS Koblenz	0–1	**Eintracht Trier**	Report
Saarland Cup (2025–26 season)	23 May 2026	Saarbrücken	**1. FC Saarbrücken**	4–2	FC 08 Homburg	Report
Saxony Cup (2025–26 season)	23 May 2026	Zwickau	FSV Zwickau	0–2	**Erzgebirge Aue**	Report
Saxony-Anhalt Cup (2025–26 season)	23 May 2026	Halle	Germania Halberstadt	0–4	**Hallescher FC**	Report
Schleswig-Holstein Cup (2025–26 season)	23 May 2026	Todesfelde	SV Todesfelde	1–4	**Phönix Lübeck**	Report
South Baden Cup (2025–26 season)	23 May 2026	Offenburg	**Bahlinger SC**	1–0	FC 08 Villingen	Report
Southwestern Cup (2025–26 season)	23 May 2026	Weingarten	**Schott Mainz**	2–1	FK Pirmasens	Report
Thuringian Cup (2025–26 season)	23 May 2026	Jena	**Carl Zeiss Jena**	1–0	ZFC Meuselwitz	Report
Westphalian Cup (Note: As one of the three largest regional associations, Westphalia gets an additional DFB-Pokal berth, which will alternate between the Oberliga Westfalen champion and best-placed Westphalian team from the Regionalliga West. This year, the Oberliga Westfalen champion qualifies.) (2025–26 season)	23 May 2026	Verl	**SC Verl**	3–0	Sportfreunde Lotte	Report
Württemberg Cup (2025–26 season)	23 May 2026	Stuttgart	Stuttgarter Kickers	1–4	**Sonnenhof Großaspach**	Report
