= 2013–14 VfB Stuttgart season =

VfB Stuttgart
2013–14 season
- Sporting Director: Fredi Bobic
- Manager: Bruno Labbadia
- Stadium: Mercedes-Benz Arena; Stuttgart, BW
- Bundesliga: 15th
- DFB-Pokal: Second round
- Europa League: Play-off round
- Top goalscorer: League: Martin Harnik; Vedad Ibišević (10 each); All: Vedad Ibišević (15 goals)
- Highest home attendance: 60,000
| Home colours | Away colours | Third colours |

The 2013–14 VfB Stuttgart season was the 121st season in club history.

== Fixtures and results ==
=== Legend ===
Win Draw Loss Postponed

=== Bundesliga ===
==== League fixtures and results ====
| 11 August 2013 1 | Mainz 05 | 3–2 | VfB Stuttgart | Mainz |
| 15:30 CEST (UTC+02:00) | Müller 14', 78'; Zimling (yellow card) 62'; Polter (yellow card) 62' | Report (in German) | Ibišević 16'; Ulreich (yellow card) 37'; Leitner (yellow card) 51'; Harnik 82'; Boka (yellow card) 85' | Stadium: Coface Arena; Attendance: 30,279; Referee: Florian Meyer (Burgdorf) |

| 17 August 2013 2 | VfB Stuttgart | 0–1 | Bayer Leverkusen | Stuttgart |
| 15:30 CEST (UTC+02:00) | Molinaro (yellow card) 11'; Traoré (yellow card) 83'; Ibišević (yellow card) 84' | Report (in German) | Schwaab 42' (o.g.); Donati (yellow card) 86'; Leno (yellow card) 90' | Stadium: Mercedes-Benz Arena; Attendance: 40,800; Referee: Felix Zwayer (Berlin) |

| 25 August 2013 3 | FC Augsburg | 2–1 | VfB Stuttgart | Augsburg |
| 17:30 CEST (UTC+02:00) | Altıntop 6'; Verhaegh (yellow card) 10'; Callsen-Bracker 36'; Hahn (yellow card) 86' | Report (in German) | Abdellaoue (yellow card) 24'; Ibišević 42'; Gentner (yellow card) 60'; Sakai (yellow card) 67'; Traoré (red card) 70' | Stadium: SGL arena Attendance: 30,030; Referee: Tobias Welz (Wiesbaden) |

| 1 September 2013 4 | VfB Stuttgart | 6–2 | 1899 Hoffenheim | Stuttgart |
| 15:30 CEST (UTC+02:00) | Rüdiger 13'; Ibišević 19', 47', 63'; Maxim 28', 55', (yellow card) 57' | Report (in German) | Volland 26', (yellow card) 72'; Abraham (yellow card) 45'; Firmino 87' | Stadium: Mercedes-Benz Arena; Attendance: 42,450; Referee: Jochen Drees (Münster-Sarmsheim) |

| 13 September 2013 5 | Hertha BSC | 0–1 | VfB Stuttgart | Berlin |
| 20:30 CEST (UTC+02:00) | Ronny (yellow card) 87' | Report (in German) | Ibišević (yellow card) 34'; Gentner 49' | Stadium: Olympiastadion; Attendance: 46,624; Referee: Deniz Aytekin (Oberasbach) |

| 21 September 2013 6 | VfB Stuttgart | 1–1 | Eintracht Frankfurt | Stuttgart |
| 15:30 CEST (UTC+02:00) | Werner 16'; Kvist (yellow card) 28'; Sakai (yellow card) 61'; Harnik (yellow card) 87' | Report (in German) | Russ 14'; Djakpa (yellow card) 39'; Anderson Bamba (yellow card) 90' | Stadium: Mercedes-Benz Arena; Attendance: 44,810; Referee: Felix Zwayer (Berlin) |

| 29 September 2013 7 | Eintracht Braunschweig | 0–4 | VfB Stuttgart | Braunschweig |
| 17:30 CEST (UTC+02:00) | | Report (in German) | Ibišević 40'; Boka (yellow card) 44'; Maxim 50'; Traoré 76'; Harnik 86' | Stadium: Eintracht-Stadion; Attendance: 22,760; Referee: Felix Brych (München) |

| 5 October 2013 8 | VfB Stuttgart | 1–1 | Werder Bremen | Stuttgart |
| 15:30 CEST (UTC+02:00) | Harnik 6'; Ibišević (yellow card) 13' | Report (in German) | Ekici (yellow card) 34'; Petersen 37'; García (yellow card) 90' | Stadium: Mercedes-Benz Arena; Attendance: 50,410; Referee: Peter Sippel (München) |

| 20 October 2013 9 | Hamburger SV | 3–3 | VfB Stuttgart | Hamburg |
| 15:30 CEST (UTC+02:00) | Lasogga 22'; Beister 55'; Van der Vaart 55'; Badelj (yellow card) 81' | Report (in German) | Maxim 3'; Gentner 37'; Djourou 64' (o.g.); Kvist (yellow card) 71'; Rüdiger (red card) 84'; Ibišević (yellow card) 90' | Stadium: Imtech Arena; Attendance: 53,167; Referee: Tobias Welz (Wiesbaden) |

| 25 October 2013 10 | VfB Stuttgart | 1–1 | 1. FC Nürnberg | Stuttgart |
| 20:30 CET (UTC+01:00) | Ibišević 3' (pen.); Maxim (yellow card) 25'; Boka (yellow card) 61' | Report (in German) | Drmić 6', (yellow card) 59' | Stadium: Mercedes-Benz Arena; Attendance: 48,460; Referee: Guido Winkmann (Kerken) |

| 1 November 2013 11 | Borussia Dortmund | 6–1 | VfB Stuttgart | Dortmund |
| 20:30 CET (UTC+01:00) | Papastathopoulos 19', (yellow card) 53'; Reus 22'; Lewandowski 54', 56', 72'; Aubameyang 81' | Report (in German) | Haggui 13' | Stadium: Signal Iduna Park; Attendance: 80,645; Referee: Florian Meyer (Burgdorf) |

| 10 November 2013 12 | SC Freiburg | 1–3 | VfB Stuttgart | Freiburg |
| 17:30 CET (UTC+01:00) | Klaus (yellow card) 28'; Hanke 78', (yellow card) 90' | Report (in German) | Ibišević 9'; Werner 10', 82'; Niedermeier (yellow card) 44' | Stadium: Mage Solar Stadion; Attendance: 23,700; Referee: Felix Zwayer (Berlin) |

| 22 November 2013 13 | VfB Stuttgart | 0–2 | Borussia Mönchengladbach | Stuttgart |
| 20:30 CET (UTC+01:00) | | Report (in German) | Raffael 37'; Wendt 73'; Xhaka (yellow card) 75'; Korb (yellow card) 83' | Stadium: Mercedes-Benz Arena; Attendance: 49,560; Referee: Thorsten Kinhöfer (Herne) |

| 30 November 2013 14 | Schalke 04 | 3–0 | VfB Stuttgart | Gelsenkirchen |
| 18:30 CET (UTC+01:00) | Matip (yellow card) 2'; Farfán 34', 47' (pen.); Boateng (yellow card) 71'; Jones 79' | Report (in German) | | Stadium: Arena AufSchalke; Attendance: 61,973; Referee: Michael Weiner (Giesen) |

| 7 December 2013 15 | VfB Stuttgart | 4–2 | Hannover 96 | Stuttgart |
| 15:30 CET (UTC+01:00 | Harnik 13'; Rüdiger (yellow card) 30'; Ibišević 33'; Traoré 51'; Rausch 83' | Report (in German) | Diouf (yellow card) 18'; Sobiech 28'; Sané 31'; Schlaudraff (yellow card) 82' | Stadium: Mercedes-Benz Arena; Attendance: 47,630; Referee: Felix Brych (München) |

| 14 December 2013 16 | VfL Wolfsburg | 3–1 | VfB Stuttgart | Wolfsburg |
| 18:30 CET (UTC+01:00 | Medojević (yellow card) 31'; Rodríguez 38'; Diego 53', (yellow card) 55'; Perišić 78' | Report (in German) | Rausch (yellow card) 20'; Harnik (yellow card) 53'; Werner 57' | Stadium: Volkswagen Arena; Attendance: 25,501; Referee: Deniz Aytekin (Oberasbach) |

| 29 January 2014 17 | VfB Stuttgart | 1–2 | Bayern Munich | Stuttgart |
| 20:00 CET (UTC+01:00 | Leitner (yellow card) 22'; Ibišević 29'; Rüdiger (yellow card) 51'; Sakai (yellow card) 57'; Boka (yellow card) 75'; Harnik (yellow card) 83' | Report (in German) | Kroos (yellow card) 50'; Dante (yellow card) 56'; Pizarro 76'; Boateng (yellow card) 83'; Thiago 90' | Stadium: Mercedes-Benz Arena; Attendance: 60,000; Referee: Manuel Gräfe (Berlin) |

| 25 January 2014 18 | VfB Stuttgart | 1–2 | Mainz 05 | Stuttgart |
| 20:00 CET (UTC+01:00 | Abdellaoue 11'; Leitner (yellow card) 88' | Report (in German) | Okazaki 40'; Noveski (yellow card) 45'; Pospech (yellow card) 71'; Saller 87' | Stadium: Mercedes-Benz Arena; Attendance: 38,000; Referee: Daniel Siebert (Berlin) |

| 1 February 2014 19 | Bayer Leverkusen | 2–1 | VfB Stuttgart | Leverkusen |
| 15:30 CET (UTC+01:00 | Kießling 26'; Spahić (yellow card) 60'; Derdiyok 84', (yellow card) 90' | Report (in German) | Leitner 12', (yellow card) 86' | Stadium: BayArena; Attendance: 28,714; Referee: Felix Zwayer (Berlin) |

| 8 February 2014 20 | VfB Stuttgart | 1–4 | FC Augsburg | Stuttgart |
| 15:30 CET (UTC+01:00 | Khedira (yellow card) 49'; Ibišević (red card) 53'; Rausch 62'; Yalçın (yellow card) 83' | Report (in German) | Milik 35'; Hahn 43', 56'; Werner 64' | Stadium: Mercedes-Benz Arena; Attendance: 40,200; Referee: Jochen Drees (Münster-Sarmsheim) |

| 15 February 2014 21 | 1899 Hoffenheim | 4–1 | VfB Stuttgart | Stuttgart |
| 15:30 CET (UTC+01:00 | Schipplock 12', 66', (yellow card) 70'; Volland 49', (yellow card) 77'; Polanski (yellow card) 53'; Firmino 90' (pen.) | Report (in German) | Leitner (yellow card) 25' (yellow-red card) 80'; Khedira (yellow card) 51'; Harnik (yellow card) 53'; Ulreich (yellow card) 75'; Rüdiger 78' | Stadium: Mercedes-Benz Arena; Attendance: 29,847; Referee: Bastian Dankert (Rostock) |

| 22 February 2014 22 | VfB Stuttgart | 1–2 | Hertha BSC | Stuttgart |
| 15:30 CET (UTC+01:00) | Boka 45' | Report (in German) | Kobiashvili 5'; Allagui (yellow card) 52'; Wagner 87', (yellow card) 90' (yellow-red card) 90' | Stadium: Mercedes-Benz Arena; Attendance: 45,700; Referee: Robert Hartmann (Wangen) |

| 2 March 2014 23 | Eintracht Frankfurt | 2–1 | VfB Stuttgart | Frankfurt |
| 17:30 CET (UTC+01:00) | Jung (yellow card) 52'; Rosenthal 80'; Meier 89' | Report (in German) | Harnik 31' | Stadium: Commerzbank Arena; Attendance: 43,200; Referee: Deniz Aytekin (Oberasbach) |

| 8 March 2014 24 | VfB Stuttgart | 2–2 | Eintracht Braunschweig | Stuttgart |
| 15:30 CET (UTC+01:00) | Schwaab (yellow card) 12'; Maxim 30'; Harnik 35'; Traoré (yellow card) 90' | Report (in German) | Hochscheidt 24', (yellow card) 86'; Pfitzner (yellow card) 45'; Bičakčić 82'; Kessel (yellow card) 90' | Stadium: Mercedes-Benz Arena; Attendance: 59,000; Referee: Christian Dingert (Lebecksmühle) |

| 15 March 2014 25 | Werder Bremen | 1–1 | VfB Stuttgart | Bremen |
| 15:30 CET (UTC+01:00) | Lukimya (yellow card) 45'; Hunt 79'; Caldirola (yellow card) 84' | Report (in German) | Harnik (yellow card) 23'; Niedermeier (yellow card) 27', (goal) 55'; Schwaab (yellow card) 63' | Stadium: Weserstadion; Attendance: 41,500; Referee: Thorsten Kinhöfer (Herne) |

| 22 March 2014 26 | VfB Stuttgart | 1–0 | Hamburger SV | Stuttgart |
| 15:30 CET (UTC+01:00) | Maxim 69'; Ulreich (yellow card) 90' | Report (in German) | Çalhanoğlu (yellow card) 53' (yellow-red card) 53' | Stadium: Mercedes-Benz Arena; Attendance: 55,000; Referee: Felix Brych (Munich) |

| 26 March 2014 27 | 1. FC Nürnberg | 2–0 | VfB Stuttgart | Nuremberg |
| 20:00 CET (UTC+01:00) | Drmić 43', 54'; Stark (yellow card) 86' | Report (in German) | Sakai (yellow card) 81' | Stadium: Grundig-Stadion; Attendance: 38,188; Referee: Tobias Welz (Wiesbaden) |

| 29 March 2014 28 | VfB Stuttgart | 2–3 | Borussia Dortmund | Stuttgart |
| 15:30 CEST (UTC+02:00) | Gentner 9'; Harnik 19'; Niedermeier (yellow card) 63' (red card) 67' | Report (in German) | Reus 30', 68', 83'; Kirch (yellow card) 35'; Großkreutz (yellow card) 90' | Stadium: Mercedes-Benz Arena; Attendance: 59,500; Referee: Michael Weiner (Giesen) |

| 5 April 2014 29 | VfB Stuttgart | 1–0 | SC Freiburg | Stuttgart |
| 15:30 CEST (UTC+02:00) | Gruezo (yellow card) 44'; Maxim 69'; Harnik 89', (yellow card) 90' | Report (in German) | Sorg (yellow card) 13' | Stadium: Mercedes-Benz Arena; Attendance: 58,500; Referee: Felix Zwayer (Berlin) |

| 12 April 2014 30 | Borussia Mönchengladbach | 1–1 | VfB Stuttgart | Mönchengladbach |
| 15:30 CEST (UTC+02:00) | Korb (yellow card) 28'; Arango 89' | Report (in German) | Didavi 12'; Schwaab (yellow card) 13'; Werner (yellow card) 25'; Gruezo (yellow card) 26' | Stadium: Borussia-Park; Attendance: 53,560; Referee: Florian Meyer (Burgdorf) |

| 20 April 2014 31 | VfB Stuttgart | 3–1 | Schalke 04 | Stuttgart |
| 17:30 CEST (UTC+02:00) | Harnik 23', 59'; Cacau (yellow card) 28', (goal) 54'; Gruezo (yellow card) 51' | Report (in German) | Kolašinac (yellow card) 34'; Boateng (yellow card) 40'; Szalai 69'; Matip (yellow card) 75' | Stadium: Mercedes-Benz Arena; Attendance: 60,000; Referee: Günter Perl (Pullach) |

| 25 April 2014 32 | Hannover 96 | 0–0 | VfB Stuttgart | Hannover |
| 20:30 CEST (UTC+02:00) | Marcelo (yellow card) 40'; Rudņevs (yellow card) 82' | Report (in German) | Didavi (yellow card) 40'; Niedermeier (yellow card) 62' | Stadium: AWD Arena; Attendance: 49,000; Referee: Wolfgang Stark (Ergolding) |

| 3 May 2014 33 | VfB Stuttgart | 1–2 | VfL Wolfsburg | Stuttgart |
| 15:30 CEST (UTC+02:00) | Gentner 62'; Maxim (yellow card) 82' | Report (in German) | De Bruyne 13'; Polák (yellow card) 46'; Olić 90' | Stadium: Mercedes-Benz Arena; Attendance: 58,000; Referee: Felix Brych (München) |

| 10 May 2014 34 | Bayern Munich | 1–0 | VfB Stuttgart | Munich |
| 15:30 CEST (UTC+02:00) | Kroos (yellow card) 22'; Dante (yellow card) 68'; Pizarro 90' | Report (in German) | Boka (yellow card) 21'; Didavi (yellow card) 75' | Stadium: Allianz Arena; Attendance: 71,000; Referee: Bastian Dankert (Rostock) |

==== League table ====
| Pos | Team | Pld | W | D | L | GF | GA | GD | Pts | Qualification or relegation |
|---|---|---|---|---|---|---|---|---|---|---|
| 13 | Eintracht Frankfurt | 34 | 9 | 9 | 16 | 40 | 57 | −17 | 36 | |
| 14 | SC Freiburg | 34 | 9 | 9 | 16 | 43 | 61 | −18 | 36 | |
| 15 | VfB Stuttgart | 34 | 8 | 8 | 18 | 49 | 62 | −13 | 32 | |
| 16 | Hamburger SV (O) | 34 | 7 | 6 | 21 | 51 | 75 | −24 | 27 | Qualification for the relegation play-offs |
| 17 | 1. FC Nürnberg (R) | 34 | 5 | 11 | 18 | 37 | 70 | −33 | 26 | Relegation to 2. Bundesliga |

Source: DFB
Rules for classification: 1) points; 2) goal difference; 3) number of goals scored.
(O) Play-off winners; (R) Relegated

==== Results summary ====
| Overall | | | | | | | | Home | | | | | | Away | | | | | |
| Pld | W | D | L | GF | GA | GD | Pts | W | D | L | GF | GA | GD | W | D | L | GF | GA | GD |
|---|---|---|---|---|---|---|---|---|---|---|---|---|---|---|---|---|---|---|---|
| 34 | 8 | 8 | 18 | 49 | 62 | −13 | 32 | 5 | 4 | 9 | 29 | 30 | −1 | 3 | 4 | 9 | 20 | 32 | −12 |

Last updated: 11 May 2014.

=== DFB-Pokal ===
| 4 August 2013 Round 1 | Berliner Dynamo | 0–2 | VfB Stuttgart | Berlin |
| 17:00 CEST (UTC+02:00) | Novacic (yellow card) 70' | Report (in German) | Ibišević 40', 76' (pen.); Schwaab (yellow card) 51'; Leitner (yellow card) 69' | Stadium: Sportforum Hohenschönhausen; Attendance: 9,227; Referee: Guido Winkmann (Kerken) |

| 25 September 2013 Round 2 | SC Freiburg | 2–1 | VfB Stuttgart | Freiburg |
| 20:30 CEST (UTC+02:00) | Mehmedi (yellow card) 33'; Ginter 52'; Krmaš (yellow card) 61'; Hanke 70'; Schmid (yellow card) 81' | Report (in German) | Ibišević 87'; Cacau (yellow card) 89'; Werner (yellow card) 90' | Stadium: Mage Solar Stadion; Attendance: 22,500; Referee: Wolfgang Stark (Ergolding) |

=== UEFA Europa League ===
==== Third qualifying round ====
| 1 August 2013 1st leg | Botev Plovdiv (Bulgaria) | 1–1 | (Germany) VfB Stuttgart | Plovdiv |
| 19:30 CEST (UTC+02:00) | Nedelev (yellow card) 66'; Domovchiyski 73' | Report (in German) | Rausch (yellow card) 47'; Werner (yellow card) 50'; Rüdiger (yellow card) 58'; Ibišević 67' | Stadium: Hristo Botev; Attendance: 12,000; Referee: Lee Probert (England) |

| 8 August 2013 2nd leg | VfB Stuttgart (Germany) | 0–0 ((a) 1–1 agg.) | (Bulgaria) Botev Plovdiv | Aspach |
| 20:20 CEST (UTC+02:00) | Maxim (yellow card) 44' | Report (in German) | Minev (yellow card) 40'; Kortzorg (yellow card) 74'; Stachowiak (yellow card) 90' | Stadium: Comtech Arena; Attendance: 7,000; Referee: Ján Valášek (Slovakia) |

==== Play-off round ====
| 22 August 2013 1st leg | HNK Rijeka (Croatia) | 2–1 | (Germany) VfB Stuttgart | Rijeka |
| 20:30 CEST (UTC+02:00) | Kvržić (yellow card) 57', (goal) 87'; Benko 74' | Report (in German) | Cacau (yellow card) 49'; Ibišević 89' | Stadium: Stadion Kantrida; Attendance: 10,600; Referee: Bas Nijhuis (Netherlands) |

| 29 August 2013 2nd leg | VfB Stuttgart (Germany) | 2–2 (3–4 agg.) | (Croatia) HNK Rijeka | Stuttgart |
| 18:00 CEST (UTC+02:00) | Gentner 35', (yellow card) 73'; Marić 75' (o.g.) | Report (in German) | Benko 30'; Males (yellow card) 41'; Pokrivac (yellow card) 88'; Mujanović 90' | Stadium: Mercedes-Benz Arena; Attendance: 25,000; Referee: Martin Hansson (Sweden) |

== Team statistics ==
| Competition | First match | Last match | Record | | | | | | | | |
| Competition | First match | Last match | G | W | D | L | GF | GA | GD | Win % | Sources |
|---|---|---|---|---|---|---|---|---|---|---|---|
| Bundesliga | 9–11 August 2013 | 10 May 2014 | 34 | 8 | 8 | 18 | 49 | 62 | −13 | 23.53 | |
| DFB-Pokal | 4 August 2013 | 25 September 2013 | 2 | 1 | 0 | 1 | 3 | 2 | +1 | 50.00 | |
| Europa League | 1 August 2013 | 29 August 2013 | 4 | 0 | 3 | 1 | 4 | 5 | −1 | 0.00 | |
| Total | | | 40 | 9 | 11 | 20 | 56 | 69 | −13 | 22.50 | — |
Updated: 11 May 2014

== Player information ==
=== Squad ===
The club's current squad:

Note: Flags indicate national team as defined under FIFA eligibility rules; some limited exceptions apply. Players may hold more than one non-FIFA nationality.

| No. | Pos. | Nation | Player |
|---|---|---|---|
| 1 | GK | GER | Sven Ulreich |
| 2 | DF | JPN | Gōtoku Sakai |
| 3 | DF | GER | Daniel Schwaab |
| 4 | MF | DEN | William Kvist |
| 5 | DF | TUN | Karim Haggui |
| 6 | DF | GER | Georg Niedermeier |
| 7 | FW | AUT | Martin Harnik |
| 8 | MF | GER | Moritz Leitner (on loan from Borussia Dortmund) |
| 9 | FW | BIH | Vedad Ibišević |
| 10 | MF | GER | Daniel Didavi |
| 12 | DF | GER | Benedikt Röcker |
| 13 | MF | GER | Patrick Funk |
| 14 | MF | NZL | Marco Rojas |
| 15 | DF | CIV | Arthur Boka |
| 16 | MF | GUI | Ibrahima Traoré |

| No. | Pos. | Nation | Player |
|---|---|---|---|
| 17 | FW | TUR | Tunay Torun |
| 18 | FW | GER | Cacau |
| 19 | FW | GER | Timo Werner |
| 20 | MF | GER | Christian Gentner (captain) |
| 21 | DF | ITA | Cristian Molinaro |
| 22 | GK | GER | Thorsten Kirschbaum |
| 23 | MF | TUR | Sercan Sararer |
| 24 | DF | GER | Antonio Rüdiger |
| 25 | FW | NOR | Mohammed Abdellaoue |
| 28 | MF | GER | Rani Khedira |
| 31 | GK | GRE | Odisseas Vlachodimos |
| 34 | DF | GER | Konstantin Rausch |
| 36 | GK | GER | Kevin Müller |
| 44 | MF | ROU | Alexandru Maxim |

=== Transfers ===
==== In ====
| No. | Pos. | Name | Age | EU | Moving from | Type | Transfer Window | Contract ends | Transfer fee | Sources |
|---|---|---|---|---|---|---|---|---|---|---|
| | MF | Sercan Sararer | 23 | No | Greuther Fürth | Transfer | Summer | 2017 | | |
| | GK | Thorsten Kirschbaum | 26 | Yes | Energie Cottbus | Transfer | Summer | 2016 | Free | |
| 25 | FW | Mohammed Abdellaoue | 27 | No | Hannover 96 | Transfer | Summer | 2017 | Undisclosed | |
| | | Patrick Funk | | | FC St. Pauli | Loan return | Summer | — | — | |

==== Out ====
| No. | Pos. | Name | Age | EU | Moving to | Type | Transfer Window | Transfer fee | Sources |
|---|---|---|---|---|---|---|---|---|---|
| | FW | Federico Macheda | | Yes | Manchester United | Loan return | Summer | — | |
| | | Felipe Lopes | | No | VfL Wolfsburg | Loan return | Summer | — | |
| | | Tim Hoogland | | Yes | Schalke 04 | Loan return | Summer | — | |
| | | Marc Ziegler | 37 | Yes | — | Retired | Summer | — | |
| | | Mamadou Bah | 25 | No | | Released | Summer | Free | |
