= Horst Haecks =

German footballer (1936–2010)

Personal information
- Date of birth: 12 August 1936
- Place of birth: Hamburg, Germany
- Date of death: 21 July 2010 (aged 73)
- Position: Forward

Senior career*
Years	Team	Apps	(Gls)
1957–1967	FC St. Pauli		
- * Club domestic league appearances and goals

Horst Haecks (12 August 1936 – 21 July 2010) was a German professional footballer who played as a forward for FC St. Pauli.

== Career ==
He played for Eisenbahner TSV Altona, HEBC Hamburg and Eimsbuetteler SV as a youth player. Haecks was forced to retire from professional playing at the age of 30 after persistent knee problems during the 1966–67 season. He scored 161 goals in 265 official matches for FC St. Pauli.

In July 1969, three years after his retirement, he made his comeback for the FC St. Pauli reserve team when it famously beat the club's first team in the NFV-Pokal, Lower Saxony's regional qualification for the DFB-Pokal.

== Death ==
Haecks died on 21 July 2010, aged 73.
