= FC Alsterbrüder =

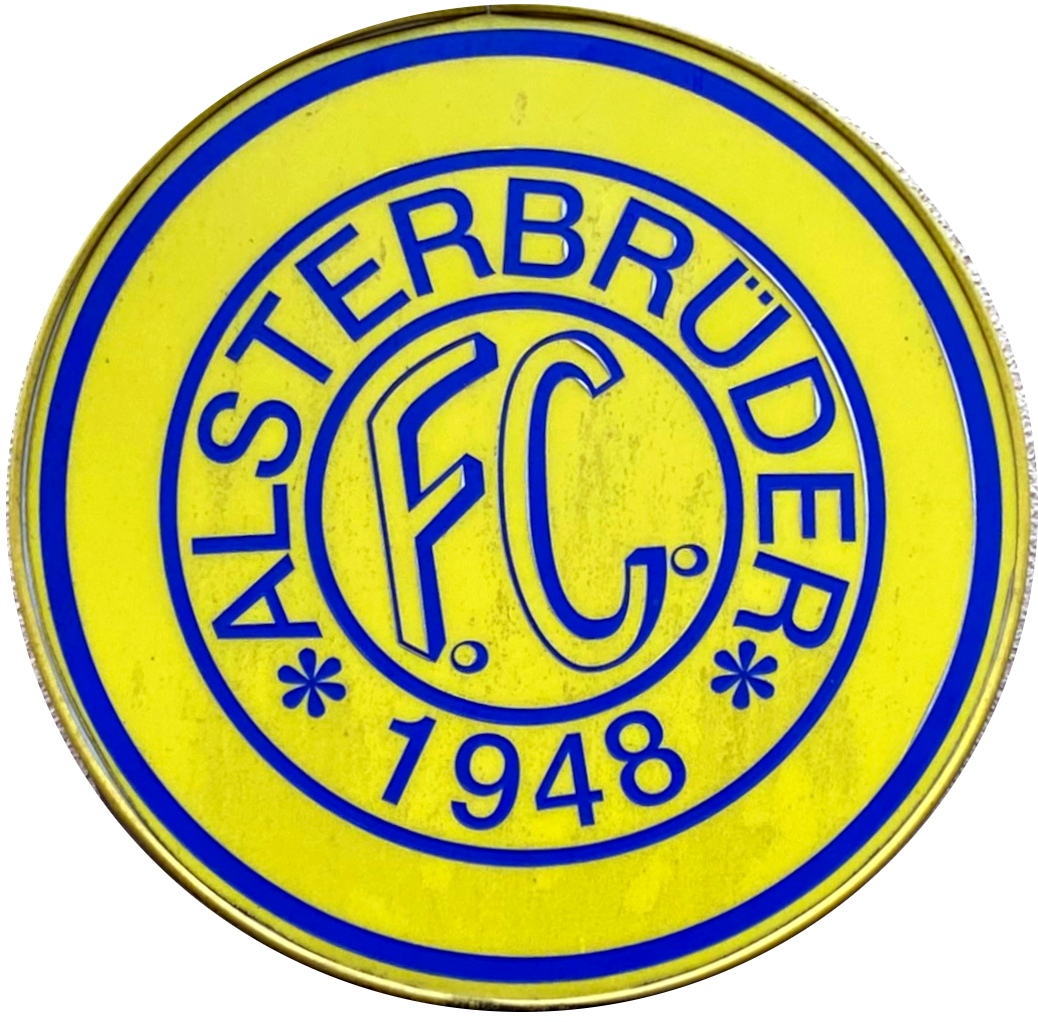
- Full name: Fußball-Club Alsterbrüder von 1948 e.V.
- Founded: 1948
- Ground: Walter-Wächter-Platz
- Capacity: 1000
- Manager: Jörn Großkopf
- League: Landesliga Hammonia (VI)
- 2024–25: Oberliga Hamburg, 16th of 18 (relegated)
Home colours

FC Alsterbrüder (full name Fußball-Club Alsterbrüder von 1948 e.V.) is a football club from the Hamburg-Eimsbüttel district in the eponymous borough. The first team was promoted to the fifth-tier Oberliga Hamburg in 2023.

== History ==
FC Alsterbrüder was founded in 1948 as the Canoe-Club Alsterbrüder-Victoria. The name is based on a club of the same name founded in 1910, which in turn was a merger of the water sports department of the SC Victoria and the Canoe-Club Alsterbrüder. The renaming to the current name took place in 1954, after the water sports department had left the club.

The teams of FC Alsterbrüder always played in the lower Hamburg amateur leagues until the first men's team were promoted to the Landesliga Hammonia at the end of the 2021/22 season. It was the first time the club played at the sixth-tier level. With a win against Hausbruch-Neugrabener Turnerschaft two matchdays before the end of the 2022/23 season, they managed to gain promotion to the Oberliga Hamburg. FC Alsterbrüder also reached the semi-finals of the Hamburger Pokal, where they were eliminated 0:7 by the Oberliga side TSV Sasel.

== Stadium ==
The home ground of FC Alsterbrüder is the Walter-Wächter-Platz in Eimsbüttel, named after the resistance fighter Walter Wächter. In 2018, club members had pushed through the renaming of the previously Gustav Falke-named sports facility due to Falke's nationalist and anti-French positions. The Emilie-Wüstenfeld-Gymnasium is located in the immediate vicinity and shares the use of the sports ground.
