= 2017–18 Hannover 96 season =

Hannover 96
2017–18 season
- President: Martin Kind
- Manager: André Breitenreiter
- Stadium: HDI-Arena
- Bundesliga: 13th
- DFB-Pokal: Second round
- Top goalscorer: League: Niclas Füllkrug (14 goals); All: Niclas Füllkrug (16 goals)
- Highest home attendance: 49,000
- Lowest home attendance: 32,800
- Average home league attendance: 42,706
- Biggest win: Bonn 2–6 Hannover
- Biggest defeat: Bremen 4–0 Hannover
| Home colours | Away colours | Third colours |

The 2017–18 Hannover 96 season was the 122nd season in the football club's history and 29th overall season in the top flight of German football, the Bundesliga, having been promoted from the 2. Bundesliga in 2017. Hannover 96 also participated in this season's edition of the domestic cup, the DFB-Pokal. This was the 59th season for Hannover in the HDI-Arena, located in Hanover, Lower Saxony, Germany. The season covered a period from 1 July 2017 to 30 June 2018.

== Players ==
=== Squad information ===
As of 18 March 2018

Note: Flags indicate national team as defined under FIFA eligibility rules; some limited exceptions apply. Players may hold more than one non-FIFA nationality.

| No. | Pos. | Nation | Player |
|---|---|---|---|
| 1 | GK | GER | Philipp Tschauner (vice-captain) |
| 2 | DF | CRO | Josip Elez (on loan from HNK Rijeka) |
| 3 | DF | CHI | Miiko Albornoz |
| 4 | DF | GER | Julian Korb |
| 5 | DF | BRA | Felipe |
| 6 | MF | GER | Marvin Bakalorz |
| 7 | MF | GER | Edgar Prib (captain) |
| 8 | MF | GER | Manuel Schmiedebach |
| 9 | FW | BRA | Jonathas |
| 10 | MF | GER | Sebastian Maier |
| 11 | MF | GER | Felix Klaus |
| 13 | FW | TOG | Ihlas Bebou |
| 14 | FW | AUT | Martin Harnik |
| 15 | DF | GER | Timo Hübers |
| 16 | FW | GER | Yousef Emghames |
| 18 | MF | NOR | Iver Fossum |

| No. | Pos. | Nation | Player |
|---|---|---|---|
| 19 | DF | GER | Florian Hübner |
| 20 | MF | SEN | Salif Sané |
| 22 | DF | GER | Matthias Ostrzolek |
| 23 | GK | GER | Michael Esser |
| 24 | FW | GER | Niclas Füllkrug |
| 25 | DF | GER | Oliver Sorg |
| 26 | FW | TUR | Kenan Karaman |
| 27 | MF | SUI | Pirmin Schwegler |
| 29 | FW | TUR | Mete Kaan Demir |
| 30 | GK | GER | Marlon Sündermann |
| 31 | DF | GER | Waldemar Anton |
| 33 | DF | GER | Fynn Arkenberg |
| 35 | FW | CUW | Charlison Benschop |
| 37 | FW | NGA | Noah Sarenren Bazee |
| 38 | MF | GER | Tom Baller |
| 40 | MF | GER | Linton Maina |

=== Out on loan ===
Note: Flags indicate national team as defined under FIFA eligibility rules; some limited exceptions apply. Players may hold more than one non-FIFA nationality.

| No. | Pos. | Nation | Player |
|---|---|---|---|
| 17 | FW | DEN | Uffe Bech (on loan to Greuther Fürth until 30 June 2018) |
| 21 | FW | GER | Marius Wolf (on loan to Eintracht Frankfurt until 30 June 2018) |
| 28 | MF | GER | Mike-Steven Bähre (on loan to SV Meppen until 30 June 2018) |
| 29 | FW | SEN | Babacar Guèye (on loan to Sint-Truidense V.V. until 30 June 2018) |
| 30 | GK | AUT | Samuel Şahin-Radlinger (on loan to SK Brann until 31 December 2018) |

=== Transfers ===
==== In ====
| No. | Pos | Player | From | Type | Window | Ends | Fee | Source |
|---|---|---|---|---|---|---|---|---|
| 4 | DF | (Germany) Julian Korb | (Germany) Borussia Mönchengladbach | Transfer | Summer | 30 June 2020 | €3 million | |
| 9 | FW | (Brazil) Jonathas | (Russia) Rubin Kazan | Transfer | Summer | 30 June 2020 | €9 million | |
| 13 | FW | (Togo) Ihlas Bebou | (Germany) Fortuna Düsseldorf | Transfer | Summer | 30 June 2021 | €4.5 million | |
| 15 | MF | (Germany) André Hoffmann | (Germany) Fortuna Düsseldorf | Return from loan | Summer | – | – | |
| 16 | FW | (Germany) Yousef Emghames | (Germany) Bayern Munich Junior Team | Transfer | Summer | 30 June 2019 | Free | |
| 22 | DF | (Germany) Matthias Ostrzolek | (Germany) Hamburger SV | Transfer | Summer | 30 June 2020 | Free | |
| 23 | GK | (Germany) Michael Esser | (Germany) Darmstadt 98 | Transfer | Summer | 30 June 2020 | €2 million | |
| 27 | MF | (Switzerland) Pirmin Schwegler | (Germany) 1899 Hoffenheim | Transfer | Summer | 30 June 2019 | Free | |
| 29 | FW | (Senegal) Babacar Guèye | (Belgium) Zulte Waregem | Return from loan | Summer | 30 June 2019 | – | |
| 38 | MF | (Germany) Tom Baller | (Germany) Borussia Mönchengladbach | Transfer | Summer | 30 June 2019 | Free | |
| 39 | FW | (Turkey) Mevlüt Erdinç | (France) FC Metz | Return from loan | Summer | 30 June 2018 | – | |
| 2 | DF | (Croatia) Josip Elez | (Croatia) HNK Rijeka | Loan | Winter | 30 June 2018 | €500,000 | |

==== Out ====
| No. | Pos | Player | To | Type | Window | Fee | Source |
|---|---|---|---|---|---|---|---|
| 4 | DF | (Norway) Stefan Strandberg | (Russia) FC Krasnodar | End of loan | Summer | – | |
| 9 | FW | (Poland) Artur Sobiech | (Germany) Darmstadt 98 | End of contract | Summer | – | |
| 13 | GK | (Croatia) Marko Marić | (Germany) 1899 Hoffenheim | End of loan | Summer | – | |
| 15 | MF | (Germany) André Hoffmann | (Germany) Fortuna Düsseldorf | Transfer | Summer | €250,000 | |
| 29 | FW | (Senegal) Babacar Guèye | (Belgium) Sint-Truidense V.V. | Loan | Summer | Free | |
| 39 | FW | (Turkey) Mevlüt Erdinç | (Turkey) İstanbul Başakşehir | Transfer | Summer | Free | |
| 40 | GK | (Germany) Timo Königsmann | (Germany) Greuther Fürth | End of contract | Summer | – | |
| 17 | FW | (Denmark) Uffe Bech | (Germany) Greuther Fürth | Loan | Winter | Free | |
| 28 | MF | (Germany) Mike-Steven Bähre | (Germany) SV Meppen | Loan | Winter | Free | |
| 30 | GK | (Austria) Samuel Şahin-Radlinger | (Norway) SK Brann | Loan | Winter | Free | |

== Friendly matches ==
Win Draw Loss Void

| 2 July 2017 Friendly | Hannoverscher SC (Germany) | 0–10 | (Germany) Hannover 96 | Hanover |
| 18:00 CEST (UTC+2) | | Report | Felipe 7'; Füllkrug 9', 34'; Prib 18'; Hübner 25'; Erdinç 66', 74', 82'; Benschop 79'; Klaus 90' (pen.) | Stadium: Stadion an der Constantinstraße; Attendance: 2,496 |

| 6 July 2017 Friendly | Weiche Flensburg (Germany) | 2–5 | (Germany) Hannover 96 | Flensburg |
| 18:30 CEST (UTC+2) | Hasanbegović 23'; Empen 35' | Report | Prib 6', 26'; Füllkrug 52', 59'; Karaman 75' | Stadium: Manfred-Werner-Stadion; Attendance: 984 |

| 9 July 2017 Friendly | TSV Havelse (Germany) | 1–2 | (Germany) Hannover 96 | Garbsen |
| 18:00 CEST (UTC+2) | Sonnenberg 12' | Report | Füllkrug 38'; Prib 69' | Stadium: Wilhelm-Langrehr-Stadion; Attendance: 2,496 |

| 12 July 2017 Friendly | SV Ramlingen-Ehlershausen (Germany) | 0–14 | (Germany) Hannover 96 | Burgdorf |
| 18:30 CEST (UTC+2) | | Report | Füllkrug 4', 21', 22', 32'; Karaman 13', 34'; Fossum 31' (pen.); Prib 48', 82'; Emghames 50'; Benschop 56', 62', 76'; Klaus 68' | Stadium: Wahrendorff-Arena; Attendance: 1,912 |

| 15 July 2017 Friendly | Hannover 96 (Germany) | 0–0 | (Netherlands) FC Twente | Sehnde |
| 19:00 CEST (UTC+2) | | Report | | Stadium: Sportplatz Ilten; Attendance: 1,996 |
Note: The game lasted for 2×60 minutes.

| 25 July 2017 Friendly | Wolfsberger AC (Austria) | 0–0 | (Germany) Hannover 96 | Wolfsberg, Carinthia, Austria |
| 19:00 CEST (UTC+2) | | Report | | Stadium: Lavanttal-Arena; Attendance: 1,000 |

| 27 July 2017 Friendly | Al-Duhail SC (Qatar) | 2–4 | (Germany) Hannover 96 | Villach, Austria |
| 15:30 CEST (UTC+2) | El-Arabi 73'; Nam 83' | Report | Bähre 2'; Harnik 9', 47'; Emghames 90' | Stadium: Sportplatz Landskron; Attendance: 400; Referee: Jürgen Fischer (Austria) |

| 27 July 2017 Friendly | Kayserispor (Turkey) | 4–2 | (Germany) Hannover 96 | Velden am Wörther See, Austria |
| 18:30 CEST (UTC+2) | Mujangi Bia 2'; Gyan 82' (pen.), 86'; Welliton 90' | Report | Klaus 18'; Füllkrug 34' | Stadium: Waldarena; Attendance: 350 |

| 30 July 2017 Friendly | Udinese Calcio (Italy) | 1–1 | (Germany) Hannover 96 | Wolfsberg, Carinthia, Austria |
| 17:00 CEST (UTC+2) | Perica 58' | Report | Klaus 57' | Stadium: Lavanttal-Arena; Attendance: 1,600 |

| 2 August 2017 Friendly | Germania Egestorf (Germany) | 1–4 | (Germany) Hannover 96 | Barsinghausen |
| 18:00 CEST (UTC+2) | Siegert 69' | Report | Maier 18'; Bakalorz 53'; Füllkrug 85'; Prib 87' | Stadium: August-Wenzel-Stadion |

| 5 August 2017 Friendly | Burnley F.C. (England) | 1–0 | (Germany) Hannover 96 | Burnley, England |
| 15:00 BST (UTC+1); 16:00 CEST (UTC+2) | Mee 41' | Report | | Stadium: Turf Moor |
Note: The match was abandoned at half-time due to Hannover 96 supporters storming the Burnley supporters' block.

| 31 August 2017 Friendly | Hannover 96 (Germany) | 7–0 | (Germany) Arminia Hannover | Hanover |
| 18:00 CEST (UTC+2) | Karaman 2', 20'; Maier 32'; Bebou 34'; Füllkrug 45'; Benschop 54'; Bähre 74' | Report | | Stadium: 96-Stadion an der Eilenriede; Attendance: 1,496; Referee: Frank Willenborg |

| 6 January 2018 H-Hotels Wintercup | Arminia Bielefeld (Germany) | 2–1 | (Germany) Hannover 96 | Bielefeld |
| 14:30 CET (UTC+1) | Weihrauch 34'; Voglsammer 44' | Report | Füllkrug 5' | Stadium: Schüco Arena |
Note: The game lasted for 2×30 minutes.

| 6 January 2018 H-Hotels Wintercup | Hannover 96 (Germany) | 1–0 | (Germany) Hertha BSC | Bielefeld |
| 17:10 CET (UTC+1) | Maier 27' | Report | | Stadium: Schüco Arena |
Note: The game lasted for 2×30 minutes.

| 9 January 2018 Friendly | Hannover 96 (Germany) | 4–1 | (Germany) SC Paderborn | Hanover |
| 15:00 CET (UTC+1) | Bebou 12'; Füllkrug 34'; Maina 57'; Benschop 69' | Report | Michel 36' | Stadium: 96-Stadion an der Eilenriede |

| 16 May 2018 Friendly | Hessen Kassel (Germany) | 1–2 | (Germany) Hannover 96 | Kassel |
| 19:00 CEST (UTC+2) | Saric 28' | Report | Bebou 66'; Karaman 74' | Stadium: Auestadion; Referee: Pascal Loschke |

== Competitions ==
Win Draw Loss

=== Overview ===
| Competition | First match | Last match | Starting round | Final position | Record | | | | | | | |
| Competition | First match | Last match | Starting round | Final position | Pld | W | D | L | GF | GA | GD | Win % |
|---|---|---|---|---|---|---|---|---|---|---|---|---|
| Bundesliga | 19 August 2017 | 12 May 2018 | Matchday 1 | 13th | 34 | 10 | 9 | 15 | 44 | 54 | −10 | 29.41 |
| DFB-Pokal | 13 August 2017 | 25 October 2017 | First round | Second round | 2 | 1 | 0 | 1 | 6 | 3 | +3 | 50.00 |
| Total | | | | | 36 | 11 | 9 | 16 | 50 | 57 | −7 | 30.56 |

Source: Competitions

=== Bundesliga ===
==== League table ====
| Pos | Team | Pld | W | D | L | GF | GA | GD | Pts |
|---|---|---|---|---|---|---|---|---|---|
| 11 | Werder Bremen | 34 | 10 | 12 | 12 | 37 | 40 | −3 | 42 |
| 12 | FC Augsburg | 34 | 10 | 11 | 13 | 43 | 46 | −3 | 41 |
| 13 | Hannover 96 | 34 | 10 | 9 | 15 | 44 | 54 | −10 | 39 |
| 14 | Mainz 05 | 34 | 9 | 9 | 16 | 38 | 52 | −14 | 36 |
| 15 | SC Freiburg | 34 | 8 | 12 | 14 | 32 | 56 | −24 | 36 |

Source: DFB
Rules for classification: 1) Points; 2) Goal difference; 3) Goals scored; 4) Head-to-head results; 5) Head-to-head away goals scored; 6) Away goals scored; 7) Play-off.

==== Results summary ====
| Overall | | | | | | | | Home | | | | | | Away | | | | | |
| Pld | W | D | L | GF | GA | GD | Pts | W | D | L | GF | GA | GD | W | D | L | GF | GA | GD |
|---|---|---|---|---|---|---|---|---|---|---|---|---|---|---|---|---|---|---|---|
| 34 | 10 | 9 | 15 | 44 | 54 | −10 | 39 | 8 | 3 | 6 | 28 | 25 | +3 | 2 | 6 | 9 | 16 | 29 | −13 |

Source: Bundesliga

==== Results by round ====
| Round | 1 | 2 | 3 | 4 | 5 | 6 | 7 | 8 | 9 | 10 | 11 | 12 | 13 | 14 | 15 | 16 | 17 | 18 | 19 | 20 | 21 | 22 | 23 | 24 | 25 | 26 | 27 | 28 | 29 | 30 | 31 | 32 | 33 | 34 |
|---|---|---|---|---|---|---|---|---|---|---|---|---|---|---|---|---|---|---|---|---|---|---|---|---|---|---|---|---|---|---|---|---|---|---|
| Ground | A | H | A | H | A | H | A | H | A | H | A | A | H | A | H | A | H | H | A | H | A | H | A | H | A | H | A | H | H | A | H | A | H | A |
| Result | W | W | D | W | D | D | L | L | W | W | L | L | D | L | W | L | D | W | D | L | D | W | D | L | L | L | L | L | W | D | L | L | W | L |
| Position | 5 | 4 | 3 | 2 | 4 | 4 | 5 | 9 | 6 | 4 | 6 | 8 | 10 | 10 | 10 | 10 | 11 | 10 | 10 | 10 | 10 | 9 | 7 | 10 | 11 | 12 | 13 | 13 | 13 | 13 | 13 | 13 | 13 | 13 |

Source: Bundesliga
A = Away; H = Home; W = Win; D = Draw; L = Loss

==== Matches ====
| 19 August 2017 1 | Mainz 05 | 0–1 | Hannover 96 | Mainz |
| 15:30 CEST (UTC+2) | | Report | Harnik 73' | Stadium: Opel Arena; Attendance: 28,279; Referee: Felix Brych |

| 27 August 2017 2 | Hannover 96 | 1–0 | Schalke 04 | Hanover |
| 18:00 CEST (UTC+2) | Jonathas 67' | Report | | Stadium: HDI-Arena; Attendance: 49,000; Referee: Patrick Ittrich |

| 9 September 2017 3 | VfL Wolfsburg | 1–1 | Hannover 96 | Wolfsburg |
| 15:30 CEST (UTC+2) | Didavi 52' | Report | Harnik 75' | Stadium: Volkswagen Arena; Attendance: 27,321; Referee: Felix Zwayer |

| 15 September 2017 4 | Hannover 96 | 2–0 | Hamburger SV | Hanover |
| 20:30 CEST (UTC+2) | Harnik 50'; Bebou 82' | Report | | Stadium: HDI-Arena; Attendance: 49,000; Referee: Robert Hartmann |

| 20 September 2017 5 | SC Freiburg | 1–1 | Hannover 96 | Freiburg |
| 20:30 CEST (UTC+2) | Petersen 83' | Report | Harnik 65' | Stadium: Schwarzwald-Stadion; Attendance: 22,900; Referee: Tobias Stieler |

| 24 September 2017 6 | Hannover 96 | 0–0 | 1. FC Köln | Hanover |
| 15:30 CEST (UTC+2) | | Report | | Stadium: HDI-Arena; Attendance: 47,000; Referee: Daniel Siebert |

| 30 September 2017 7 | Borussia Mönchengladbach | 2–1 | Hannover 96 | Mönchengladbach |
| 15:40 CEST (UTC+2) | Ginter 67'; Hazard 90+4' (pen.) | Report | Harnik 71' | Stadium: Borussia-Park; Attendance: 50,542; Referee: Christian Dingert |
Note: The match, originally scheduled for 15:30 CEST, was delayed to 15:40 CEST due to a traffic jam outside the stadium.

| 14 October 2017 8 | Hannover 96 | 1–2 | Eintracht Frankfurt | Hanover |
| 15:30 CEST (UTC+2) | Sané 36' | Report | Haller 10'; Rebić 89' | Stadium: HDI-Arena; Attendance: 43,500; Referee: Bastian Dankert |

| 21 October 2017 9 | FC Augsburg | 1–2 | Hannover 96 | Augsburg |
| 15:30 CEST (UTC+2) | Gregoritsch 33' | Report | Füllkrug 76', 89' | Stadium: WWK Arena; Attendance: 25,971; Referee: Sascha Stegemann |

| 28 October 2017 10 | Hannover 96 | 4–2 | Borussia Dortmund | Hanover |
| 15:30 CEST (UTC+2) | Jonathas 20' (pen.); Bebou 40', 86'; Klaus 60' | Report | Zagadou 27'; Yarmolenko 52' | Stadium: HDI-Arena; Attendance: 49,000; Referee: Patrick Ittrich |

| 4 November 2017 11 | RB Leipzig | 2–1 | Hannover 96 | Leipzig |
| 15:30 CET (UTC+1) | Poulsen 70'; Werner 85' | Report | Jonathas 56' | Stadium: Red Bull Arena; Attendance: 40,461; Referee: Martin Petersen |

| 19 November 2017 12 | Werder Bremen | 4–0 | Hannover 96 | Bremen |
| 18:00 CET (UTC+1) | Bartels 39'; Kruse 55', 59', 78' | Report | | Stadium: Weser-Stadion; Attendance: 41,500; Referee: Benjamin Cortus |

| 24 November 2017 13 | Hannover 96 | 1–1 | VfB Stuttgart | Hanover |
| 20:30 CET (UTC+1) | Füllkrug 76' (pen.) | Report | Asano 24' | Stadium: HDI-Arena; Attendance: 43,500; Referee: Christian Dingert |

| 2 December 2017 14 | Bayern Munich | 3–1 | Hannover 96 | Munich |
| 15:30 CET (UTC+1) | Vidal 17'; Coman 67'; Lewandowski 87' (pen.) | Report | Benschop 35' | Stadium: Allianz Arena; Attendance: 75,000; Referee: Guido Winkmann |

| 10 December 2017 15 | Hannover 96 | 2–0 | 1899 Hoffenheim | Hanover |
| 15:30 CET (UTC+1) | Füllkrug 59'; Harnik 85' | Report | | Stadium: HDI-Arena; Attendance: 36,800; Referee: Markus Schmidt |

| 13 December 2017 16 | Hertha BSC | 3–1 | Hannover 96 | Berlin |
| 20:30 CET (UTC+1) | Kalou 18', 45'; Torunarigha 83' | Report | Bebou 65' | Stadium: Olympiastadion Berlin; Attendance: 29,231; Referee: Robert Hartmann |

| 17 December 2017 17 | Hannover 96 | 4–4 | Bayer Leverkusen | Hanover |
| 15:30 CET (UTC+1) | Bebou 12'; Füllkrug 21' (pen.); Klaus 45'; Korb 83' | Report | Brandt 11'; Mehmedi 25'; Bailey 47', 67' | Stadium: HDI-Arena; Attendance: 32,800; Referee: Sören Storks |

| 13 January 2018 18 | Hannover 96 | 3–2 | Mainz 05 | Hanover |
| 15:30 CET (UTC+1) | Füllkrug 33', 38' (pen.), 75' | Report | Mutō 26'; Hack 31' | Stadium: HDI-Arena; Attendance: 34,500; Referee: Bastian Dankert |

| 21 January 2018 19 | Schalke 04 | 1–1 | Hannover 96 | Gelsenkirchen |
| 18:00 CET (UTC+1) | Pjaca 16' | Report | Füllkrug 86' | Stadium: Veltins-Arena; Attendance: 60,650; Referee: Martin Petersen |

| 28 January 2018 20 | Hannover 96 | 0–1 | VfL Wolfsburg | Hanover |
| 18:00 CET (UTC+1) | | Report | Mallı 72' | Stadium: HDI-Arena; Attendance: 34,300; Referee: Felix Brych |

| 4 February 2018 21 | Hamburger SV | 1–1 | Hannover 96 | Hamburg |
| 18:00 CET (UTC+1) | Kostić 86' | Report | Fossum 37' | Stadium: Volksparkstadion; Attendance: 46,016; Referee: Sascha Stegemann |

| 10 February 2018 22 | Hannover 96 | 2–1 | SC Freiburg | Hanover |
| 15:30 CET (UTC+1) | Anton 28'; Klaus 54' | Report | Gulde 88' | Stadium: HDI-Arena; Attendance: 37,800; Referee: Manuel Gräfe |

| 17 February 2018 23 | 1. FC Köln | 1–1 | Hannover 96 | Cologne |
| 15:30 CET (UTC+1) | Osako 29' | Report | Füllkrug 37' | Stadium: RheinEnergieStadion; Attendance: 48,400; Referee: Markus Schmidt |

| 24 February 2018 24 | Hannover 96 | 0–1 | Borussia Mönchengladbach | Hanover |
| 15:30 CET (UTC+1) | | Report | Kramer 72' | Stadium: HDI-Arena; Attendance: 43,000; Referee: Robert Kampka |

| 3 March 2018 25 | Eintracht Frankfurt | 1–0 | Hannover 96 | Frankfurt |
| 15:30 CET (UTC+1) | da Costa 39' | Report | | Stadium: Commerzbank-Arena; Attendance: 48,500; Referee: Marco Fritz |

| 10 March 2018 26 | Hannover 96 | 1–3 | FC Augsburg | Hanover |
| 15:30 CET (UTC+1) | Sané 37' | Report | Gregoritsch 26', 83'; Kačar 45+2' | Stadium: HDI-Arena; Attendance: 36,500; Referee: Bastian Dankert |

| 18 March 2018 27 | Borussia Dortmund | 1–0 | Hannover 96 | Dortmund |
| 13:30 CET (UTC+1) | Batshuayi 24' | Report | | Stadium: Signal Iduna Park; Attendance: 81,360; Referee: Patrick Ittrich |

| 31 March 2018 28 | Hannover 96 | 2–3 | RB Leipzig | Hanover |
| 15:30 CEST (UTC+2) | Sané 71'; Füllkrug 78' | Report | Forsberg 16'; Orbán 53'; Poulsen 76' | Stadium: HDI-Arena; Attendance: 42,300; Referee: Guido Winkmann |

| 6 April 2018 29 | Hannover 96 | 2–1 | Werder Bremen | Hanover |
| 20:30 CEST (UTC+2) | Harnik 17'; Klaus 42' | Report | Belfodil 74' | Stadium: HDI-Arena; Attendance: 49,000; Referee: Tobias Welz |

| 14 April 2018 30 | VfB Stuttgart | 1–1 | Hannover 96 | Stuttgart |
| 15:30 CEST (UTC+2) | Thommy 53' | Report | Füllkrug 90+1' | Stadium: Mercedes-Benz Arena; Attendance: 57,131; Referee: Sven Jablonski |

| 21 April 2018 31 | Hannover 96 | 0–3 | Bayern Munich | Hanover |
| 15:30 CEST (UTC+2) | | Report | Müller 57'; Lewandowski 73'; Rudy 89' | Stadium: HDI-Arena; Attendance: 49,000; Referee: Martin Petersen |

| 27 April 2018 32 | 1899 Hoffenheim | 3–1 | Hannover 96 | Sinsheim |
| 20:30 CEST (UTC+2) | Kramarić 16', 50', 86' | Report | Karaman 24' | Stadium: Wirsol Rhein-Neckar-Arena; Attendance: 26,452; Referee: Patrick Ittrich |

| 5 May 2018 33 | Hannover 96 | 3–1 | Hertha BSC | Hanover |
| 15:30 CEST (UTC+2) | Harnik 4'; Sané 40'; Füllkrug 42' | Report | Selke 73' | Stadium: HDI-Arena; Attendance: 49,000; Referee: Sören Storks |

| 12 May 2018 34 | Bayer Leverkusen | 3–2 | Hannover 96 | Leverkusen |
| 15:30 CEST (UTC+2) | Alario 3', 18'; Brandt 55' | Report | Füllkrug 90+1'; Harnik 90+4' | Stadium: BayArena; Attendance: 30,210; Referee: Guido Winkmann |

=== DFB-Pokal ===
| 13 August 2017 First round | Bonner SC | 2–6 | Hannover 96 | Bonn |
| 15:30 CEST (UTC+2) | Lokotsch 20'; Perrey 83' | Report | Füllkrug 34', 74'; Harnik 60', 90+3'; Karaman 90'; Maier 90+1' | Stadium: Sportpark Nord; Attendance: 9,500; Referee: Daniel Schlager |

| 25 October 2017 Second round | VfL Wolfsburg | 1–0 | Hannover 96 | Wolfsburg |
| 18:30 CEST (UTC+2) | Uduokhai 49' | Report | | Stadium: Volkswagen Arena; Attendance: 15,508; Referee: Felix Brych |

== Statistics ==
=== Appearances and goals ===
| No. | Pos | Player | Bundesliga | | DFB-Pokal | | Total | |
| No. | Pos | Player | Apps | Goals | Apps | Goals | Apps | Goals |
|---|---|---|---|---|---|---|---|---|
| 1 | GK | (Germany) Philipp Tschauner | 31 | 0 | 1 | 0 | 32 | 0 |
| 2 | DF | (Croatia) Josip Elez | 9+2 | 0 | 0 | 0 | 11 | 0 |
| 3 | DF | (Chile) Miiko Albornoz | 7+3 | 0 | 1 | 0 | 11 | 0 |
| 4 | DF | (Germany) Julian Korb | 28 | 1 | 1 | 0 | 29 | 1 |
| 5 | DF | (Brazil) Felipe | 6 | 0 | 1 | 0 | 7 | 0 |
| 6 | MF | (Germany) Marvin Bakalorz | 23+3 | 0 | 1+1 | 0 | 28 | 0 |
| 7 | MF | (Germany) Edgar Prib | 0 | 0 | 1 | 0 | 1 | 0 |
| 8 | MF | (Germany) Manuel Schmiedebach | 2+4 | 0 | 1 | 0 | 7 | 0 |
| 9 | FW | (Brazil) Jonathas | 7+5 | 3 | 1 | 0 | 13 | 3 |
| 10 | MF | (Germany) Sebastian Maier | 2+7 | 0 | 1+1 | 1 | 11 | 1 |
| 11 | MF | (Germany) Felix Klaus | 25+3 | 4 | 1 | 0 | 29 | 4 |
| 13 | FW | (Togo) Ihlas Bebou | 21+9 | 5 | 1 | 0 | 31 | 5 |
| 14 | FW | (Austria) Martin Harnik | 21+8 | 9 | 2 | 2 | 31 | 11 |
| 15 | DF | (Germany) Timo Hübers | 5 | 0 | 0 | 0 | 5 | 0 |
| 16 | FW | (Germany) Yousef Emghames | 0 | 0 | 0 | 0 | 0 | 0 |
| 17 | FW | (Denmark) Uffe Bech | 0 | 0 | 0 | 0 | 0 | 0 |
| 18 | MF | (Norway) Iver Fossum | 13+6 | 1 | 0 | 0 | 19 | 1 |
| 19 | DF | (Germany) Florian Hübner | 4+4 | 0 | 0 | 0 | 8 | 0 |
| 20 | MF | (Senegal) Salif Sané | 31 | 4 | 2 | 0 | 33 | 4 |
| 22 | DF | (Germany) Matthias Ostrzolek | 27 | 0 | 1 | 0 | 28 | 0 |
| 23 | GK | (Germany) Michael Esser | 3 | 0 | 1 | 0 | 4 | 0 |
| 24 | FW | (Germany) Niclas Füllkrug | 26+7 | 14 | 1+1 | 2 | 35 | 16 |
| 25 | DF | (Germany) Oliver Sorg | 20+2 | 0 | 1 | 0 | 23 | 0 |
| 26 | FW | (Turkey) Kenan Karaman | 8+13 | 1 | 0+2 | 1 | 23 | 2 |
| 27 | MF | (Switzerland) Pirmin Schwegler | 27+2 | 0 | 1 | 0 | 30 | 0 |
| 28 | DF | (Germany) Mike-Steven Bähre | 0 | 0 | 0 | 0 | 0 | 0 |
| 29 | FW | (Turkey) Mete Kaan Demir | 0 | 0 | 0 | 0 | 0 | 0 |
| 30 | GK | (Austria) Samuel Şahin-Radlinger | 0 | 0 | 0 | 0 | 0 | 0 |
| 30 | GK | (Germany) Marlon Sündermann | 0 | 0 | 0 | 0 | 0 | 0 |
| 31 | DF | (Germany) Waldemar Anton | 26+1 | 1 | 2 | 0 | 29 | 1 |
| 33 | DF | (Germany) Fynn Arkenberg | 0 | 0 | 0 | 0 | 0 | 0 |
| 35 | FW | (Curaçao) Charlison Benschop | 2+4 | 1 | 0+1 | 0 | 7 | 1 |
| 37 | MF | (Nigeria) Noah Sarenren Bazee | 0+6 | 0 | 0 | 0 | 6 | 0 |
| 38 | MF | (Germany) Tom Baller | 0 | 0 | 0 | 0 | 0 | 0 |
| 40 | MF | (Germany) Linton Maina | 0+2 | 0 | 0 | 0 | 2 | 0 |

=== Goalscorers ===
| Rank | No. | Pos | Name | Bundesliga | DFB-Pokal | Total |
|---|---|---|---|---|---|---|
| 1 | 24 | FW | (Germany) Niclas Füllkrug | 14 | 2 | 16 |
| 2 | 14 | FW | (Austria) Martin Harnik | 9 | 2 | 11 |
| 3 | 13 | FW | (Togo) Ihlas Bebou | 5 | 0 | 5 |
| 4 | 11 | MF | (Germany) Felix Klaus | 4 | 0 | 4 |
| 4 | 20 | MF | (Senegal) Salif Sané | 4 | 0 | 4 |
| 6 | 9 | FW | (Brazil) Jonathas | 3 | 0 | 3 |
| 7 | 26 | FW | (Turkey) Kenan Karaman | 1 | 1 | 2 |
| 8 | 4 | DF | (Germany) Julian Korb | 1 | 0 | 1 |
| 8 | 10 | MF | (Germany) Sebastian Maier | 0 | 1 | 1 |
| 8 | 18 | MF | (Norway) Iver Fossum | 1 | 0 | 1 |
| 8 | 31 | DF | (Germany) Waldemar Anton | 1 | 0 | 1 |
| 8 | 35 | FW | (Curaçao) Charlison Benschop | 1 | 0 | 1 |
| Total | | | | 44 | 6 | 50 |

=== Clean sheets ===
| Rank | No. | Pos | Name | Bundesliga | DFB-Pokal | Total |
|---|---|---|---|---|---|---|
| 1 | 1 | GK | (Germany) Philipp Tschauner | 5 | 0 | 5 |
| Total | | | | 5 | 0 | 5 |

=== Disciplinary record ===
| Rank | No. | Pos | Name | Bundesliga | | | DFB-Pokal | | | Total | | |
| Rank | No. | Pos | Name | Booked | (yellow card) (yellow-red card) | Sent off (straight red) | Booked | (yellow card) (yellow-red card) | Sent off (straight red) | Booked | (yellow card) (yellow-red card) | Sent off (straight red) |
|---|---|---|---|---|---|---|---|---|---|---|---|---|
| 1 | 27 | MF | (Switzerland) Pirmin Schwegler | 9 | 0 | 0 | 0 | 0 | 0 | 9 | 0 | 0 |
| 2 | 4 | DF | (Germany) Julian Korb | 8 | 0 | 0 | 0 | 0 | 0 | 8 | 0 | 0 |
| 3 | 11 | MF | (Germany) Felix Klaus | 5 | 0 | 0 | 1 | 0 | 0 | 6 | 0 | 0 |
| 3 | 20 | MF | (Senegal) Salif Sané | 6 | 0 | 0 | 0 | 0 | 0 | 6 | 0 | 0 |
| 5 | 22 | DF | (Germany) Matthias Ostrzolek | 5 | 0 | 0 | 0 | 0 | 0 | 5 | 0 | 0 |
| 6 | 6 | MF | (Germany) Marvin Bakalorz | 4 | 0 | 0 | 0 | 0 | 0 | 4 | 0 | 0 |
| 6 | 25 | DF | (Germany) Oliver Sorg | 4 | 0 | 0 | 0 | 0 | 0 | 4 | 0 | 0 |
| 8 | 13 | FW | (Togo) Ihlas Bebou | 3 | 0 | 0 | 0 | 0 | 0 | 3 | 0 | 0 |
| 9 | 9 | FW | (Brazil) Jonathas | 2 | 0 | 0 | 0 | 0 | 0 | 2 | 0 | 0 |
| 9 | 14 | FW | (Austria) Martin Harnik | 2 | 0 | 0 | 0 | 0 | 0 | 2 | 0 | 0 |
| 9 | 15 | DF | (Germany) Timo Hübers | 2 | 0 | 0 | 0 | 0 | 0 | 2 | 0 | 0 |
| 9 | 19 | DF | (Germany) Florian Hübner | 2 | 0 | 0 | 0 | 0 | 0 | 2 | 0 | 0 |
| 9 | 24 | FW | (Germany) Niclas Füllkrug | 2 | 0 | 0 | 0 | 0 | 0 | 2 | 0 | 0 |
| 9 | 26 | FW | (Turkey) Kenan Karaman | 2 | 0 | 0 | 0 | 0 | 0 | 2 | 0 | 0 |
| 15 | 1 | GK | (Germany) Philipp Tschauner | 1 | 0 | 0 | 0 | 0 | 0 | 1 | 0 | 0 |
| 15 | 2 | DF | (Croatia) Josip Elez | 1 | 0 | 0 | 0 | 0 | 0 | 1 | 0 | 0 |
| 15 | 3 | DF | (Chile) Miiko Albornoz | 1 | 0 | 0 | 0 | 0 | 0 | 1 | 0 | 0 |
| 15 | 8 | MF | (Germany) Manuel Schmiedebach | 1 | 0 | 0 | 0 | 0 | 0 | 1 | 0 | 0 |
| 15 | 31 | DF | (Germany) Waldemar Anton | 1 | 0 | 0 | 0 | 0 | 0 | 1 | 0 | 0 |
| 15 | 37 | MF | (Nigeria) Noah Sarenren Bazee | 1 | 0 | 0 | 0 | 0 | 0 | 1 | 0 | 0 |
| Total | | | | 62 | 0 | 0 | 1 | 0 | 0 | 63 | 0 | 0 |
