= Hamburg-Eimsbütteler Ballspiel-Club =

German association football club from Hamburg, Germany

- Full name: Hamburg-Eimsbütteler-Ballspiel-Club von 1911 e. V.
- Founded: 1911
- Ground: Professor-Reinmüller-Platz
- League: Oberliga Hamburg (V)
- 2025–26: Oberliga Hamburg, 13th of 18
- Website: https://hebc.de/
Home colours	Away colours

Hamburg-Eimsbütteler Ballspiel-Club (German: Hamburg-Eimsbütteler Ballspiel-Club e.V.) is a German sports club in Eimsbüttel, Hamburg, Germany. The club is also known as HEBC Hamburg, HEBC and Hamburg-Eimsbütteler BC.

== History ==
The club was founded in 1911 as SC Eibe. The club merged three times over ten years. First, they merged with Harvestehuder FC in 1912 to form Hamburger BC 1911. They had a failed merger with SC Hansa 1911 in 1919 then merged with Eimsbütteler SC in 1921 to form Hamburg-Eimsbütteler BC. They then merged with Sport 01 Hamburg during World War II but re-formed as Hamburg-Eimsbütteler Ballspiel-Club after. During these years, they were mostly in the second division of the Fußball-Bezirksklasse Groß-Hamburg (Football district class Greater Hamburg). The club competed in the 1935 Tschammerpokal, but was eliminated by Eimsbütteler TV, 7:3.

The club played in the 1. Klasse Hamburg from 1945 to 1947, which was the second highest class of West German football. They were relegated in 1949 and had dropped down to the fourth division by 1951. The club made it back to the third division from 1954 to 1957 then made it to the second division until demotion in 1960. With the creation of the Bundesliga in 1963, they remained in the third division. The team made it to the finals of the Hamburg Cup in 1982–83 but were defeated by Hummelsbütteler SV in the penalty kick shootout.

The team struggled in the decades after, often staying in the sixth division in the 1990s and 2000s. They were demoted to the 7th division in 2011 and had to fight off other demotion battles before eventually making it back to the fifth division in 2017–18, where they play today.

The club received the Uwe-Seeler-Preis (Uwe-Seeler-Prize) in 2016 for their contributions to youth football. Andy Grote and Uwe Seeler awarded the prize. The club's indoor soccer team competed for the Laubvogel Cup in 2017. The team hired Özden Kocadal as a head coach in 2019. HEBC made significant upgrades to their facilities in 2020, with the installation of LED's and floodlights.

The club's main rival is Altona 93, with matches between the clubs being considered a derby.

HEBC won the 2025–26 Hamburg Cup to qualify for the 2026–27 DFB-Pokal, its first ever appearance in the competition. It hosted Bundesliga side Borussia Dortmund in the first round at the Volksparkstadion, and set a Pokal attendance record for a match involving a fifth-tier side.

== Honors ==
- Fußball-Bezirksklasse Groß-Hamburg

Champions: 1942–43

- Verbandsliga Hamburg-Germania

Champions: 1956–57

- Hamburg Cup

Champions: 2026

== Notable players and staff ==
- Horst Haecks - Played for the club as a youth player and later played for FC St. Pauli.
- Aferdita Kameraj - Played for the club as a youth player. She later played in the Frauen-Bundesliga for Hamburger SV.
- Jörn Großkopf - He played in the Bundesliga for FC St. Pauli and later coached HEBC Hamburg from 2018 to 2019.
- David Philipp - Played for the club as a youth player and later played for the Germany youth football team.
- Thomas Wolter - Played for the club from 1979 to 1984 and made an appearance for the Germany national team.
- Daniel Brückner - Played for the club from 2001 to 2004 and later played for SC Paderborn in the Bundesliga.
- Burghard Rylewicz - He played for the club as a youth player and later played in the first division for VfB Oldenburg and Borussia Dortmund.
- Heinrich Kokartis - He played for the club as a youth player and later played for Werder Bremen.
- André Trulsen - He played for the club as a youth player and later played for FC St. Pauli and 1. FC Köln. He was later voted in as one of the best players in FC St. Pauli's history.
