= FC Türkiye Wilhelmsburg =

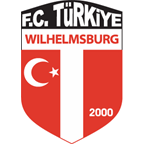
- Full name: Fußballclub Türkiye Wilhelmsburg 2000 e. V.
- Nickname: Türkiye
- Founded: 1976
- Ground: Stadion an der Landesgrenze (Platz 1)
- Capacity: 2,500
- Manager: Faraz Farbin
- League: Landesliga Hamburg (VI)
- 2025–26: Oberliga Hamburg, 16th of 18 (relegated)
Home colours

FC Türkiye Wilhelmsburg is a football club based in Wilhelmsburg, Hamburg, Germany. The club was founded in 1976. They currently compete in the Oberliga Hamburg, which is the fifth tier of the German football league system.

== History ==
The club was founded in 1999 by Turks living in Hamburg and was promoted to the district league just five years later . There they made it into the national league as runner-up . After a tenth place in the promotion season, the Wilhelmsburg team had to go back down to the district league in 2008. This was followed by direct promotion back to the state league, where the team came fourth in 2010 and 2012. Finally, the team became champions in 2015 and was promoted to the top league. In the 2017/18 season, the Wilhelmsburgers were relegated back to the state league as third-to-last. They were promoted again in 2022 as champions of the Landesliga 2 season. In the 2022/23 season, the class was maintained with 12th place in the table.

== See also ==
- List of football clubs in Germany
