= Achille Esther =

Seychelles footballer

Personal information
- Full name: Achille Esther
- Date of birth: 24 May 2002 (age 24)
- Place of birth: Seychelles
- Position: Midfielder

Team information
- Current team: La Passe

Senior career*
Years	Team	Apps	(Gls)
2018–	La Passe		

International career^{‡}
2021–	Seychelles	1	(0)
- * Club domestic league appearances and goals ‡ National team caps and goals as of 15:51, 30 January 2022 (UTC)

Achille Esther (born 24 May 2002) is a Seychellois footballer who plays as a defender for Seychelles First Division club La Passe FC and the Seychelles national team.

== Club career ==
In November 2019, while a member of La Passe FC of the Seychelles First Division, Esther traveled to Germany for a two-week training stint with VfL Lohbrügge of the Landesliga Hamburg-Hansa. He was joined on the trip by twin brothers, Assad and Affandi Aboudou.

== International career ==
Esther made his senior international debut on 1 September 2021 in a friendly against Comoros.

=== International career statistics ===
As of match played 1 September 2021

Seychelles national team
Year	Apps	Goals
2021	1	0
2022	0	0
Total	1	0
