= 2018 FIFA World Cup qualification – AFC second round =

International football competition

Tournament details
- Dates: 11 June 2015 – 29 March 2016
- Teams: 39 (Note: Indonesia was also drawn into this group, but on 30 May 2015 the country's football association was suspended due to governmental interference, and on 3 June 2015 the team was disqualified and all matches involving it were cancelled.) (from 1 confederation)

Tournament statistics
- Matches played: 152
- Goals scored: 507 (3.34 per match)
- Attendance: 2,293,258 (15,087 per match)
- Top scorer(s): (Saudi Arabia) Mohammad Al-Sahlawi (14 goals)

The second round of AFC matches for 2018 FIFA World Cup qualification (and 2019 AFC Asian Cup qualification) was played from 24 May 2015 to 29 March 2016.

== Format ==
A total of forty teams (teams ranked 1–34 in the AFC entrant list and six first round winners) were divided into eight groups of five teams to play home-and-away round-robin matches. The eight group winners and the four best group runners-up advanced to the third round of FIFA World Cup qualification as well as qualify for the 2019 AFC Asian Cup finals.

A total of 24 teams eliminated from World Cup qualification in the second round competed in the third round of 2019 AFC Asian Cup qualification (which was separated from the third round of 2018 FIFA World Cup qualification), where they were divided into six groups of four teams and competed for the remaining slots of the 2019 AFC Asian Cup. The 24 teams consisted of the sixteen highest ranked teams eliminated in the second round, and the eight teams that advanced from the play-off round of 2019 AFC Asian Cup qualification which were contested by the remaining twelve teams eliminated in the second round.

== Seeding ==
The draw for the second round was held on 14 April 2015, at 17:00 MST (UTC+8), at the JW Marriott Hotel in Kuala Lumpur, Malaysia.

The seeding was based on the FIFA World Rankings of April 2015 (shown in parentheses below). The 40 teams were seeded into five pots:

- Pot 1 contained the teams ranked 1–8.
- Pot 2 contained the teams ranked 9–16.
- Pot 3 contained the teams ranked 17–24.
- Pot 4 contained the teams ranked 25–32.
- Pot 5 contained the teams ranked 33–40.

Each group contained one team from each of the five pots. The fixtures of each group were automatically decided based on the respective pot of each team.

As the seeding order was based on the most recent FIFA Rankings prior to the draw, it differed from the order in the AFC entrant list, which was based on the FIFA World Rankings of January 2015. Among the six first round winners, three were seeded higher than pot 5 (India in pot 3, Timor-Leste and Bhutan in pot 4), on the basis of ranking points gained from the first round matches, while the other three (Yemen, Cambodia and Chinese Taipei) were seeded in pot 5.

| Pot 1 | Pot 2 | Pot 3 |
|---|---|---|
| 1. **Iran** (40); 2. **Japan** (50); 3. **South Korea** (57); 4. **Australia** (63); 5. **United Arab Emirates** (68) (Note: United Arab Emirates had already qualified for the 2019 AFC Asian Cup as tournament hosts and were competing to qualify for the 2018 FIFA World Cup.); 6. **Uzbekistan** (73); 7. **China** (82); 8. **Iraq** (86) | 9. **Saudi Arabia** (95); 10. Oman (97); 11. **Qatar** (99); 12. Jordan (103); 13. Bahrain (108); 14. Vietnam (125); 15. **Syria** (126); 16. Kuwait (127) | 17. Afghanistan (135); 18. Philippines (139); 19. Palestine (140); 20. Maldives (141); 21. **Thailand** (142); 22. Tajikistan (143); 23. Lebanon (144); 24. India (147) |
| Pot 4 | Pot 5 | |
| 25. Timor-Leste (152); 26. Kyrgyzstan (153); 27. North Korea (157); 28. Myanmar (158); 29. Turkmenistan (159); 30. Indonesia (159) **(D)**; 31. Singapore (162); 32. Bhutan (163) | 33. Malaysia (164); 34. Hong Kong (167); 35. Bangladesh (167); 36. Yemen (170); 37. Guam (175); 38. Laos (178); 39. Cambodia (179); 40. Chinese Taipei (179) | |

Notes

- **Bolded** teams qualified for the third round.
- (D): Disqualified after draw

2018 FIFA World Cup qualification tiebreakers
In league format, the ranking of teams in each group was based on the following criteria (regulations Articles 20.6 and 20.7):
1. Points (3 points for a win, 1 point for a draw, 0 points for a loss)
2. Overall goal difference
3. Overall goals scored
4. Points in matches between tied teams
5. Goal difference in matches between tied teams
6. Goals scored in matches between tied teams
7. Away goals scored in matches between tied teams (if the tie was only between two teams in home-and-away league format)
8. Fair play points
  - first yellow card: minus 1 point
  - indirect red card (second yellow card): minus 3 points
  - direct red card: minus 4 points
  - yellow card and direct red card: minus 5 points
9. Drawing of lots by the FIFA Organising Committee

== Group A ==
| Pos | Team | Pld | W | D | L | GF | GA | GD | Pts | Qualification | Saudi Arabia | United Arab Emirates | Palestine | Malaysia | East Timor |
|---|---|---|---|---|---|---|---|---|---|---|---|---|---|---|---|
| 1 | Saudi Arabia | 8 | 6 | 2 | 0 | 28 | 4 | +24 | 20 | World Cup qualifying third round and Asian Cup | — | 2–1 | 3–2 | 2–0 | 7–0 (Note: On 12 December 2017, AFC decided to forfeit the first five matches involving Timor-Leste – both v Malaysia, home v United Arab Emirates, away v Saudi Arabia, and home v Palestine due to the use of falsified documents for their players of Timor-Leste.) |
| 2 | United Arab Emirates (Note: United Arab Emirates already qualified for the Asian Cup as the host nation.) | 8 | 5 | 2 | 1 | 27 | 4 | +23 | 17 | World Cup qualifying third round | 1–1 | — | 2–0 | 10–0 | 8–0 |
| 3 | Palestine | 8 | 4 | 2 | 2 | 24 | 5 | +19 | 14 | Asian Cup qualifying third round | 0–0 | 0–0 | — | 6–0 | 7–0 |
| 4 | Malaysia | 8 | 2 | 0 | 6 | 7 | 29 | −22 | 6 | Asian Cup qualifying play-off round | 0–3 (Note: Match abandoned after 87 minutes due to a group of supporters throwing flares at the pitch. A month later, FIFA awarded Saudi Arabia 3–0 win.) | 1–2 | 0–6 | — | 1–1 |
| 5 | Timor-Leste | 8 | 0 | 0 | 8 | 0 | 44 | −44 | 0 | Asian Cup qualifying play-off round | 0–10 | 0–1 | 1–1 | 0–1 | — |

Rules for classification: Qualification tiebreakers
Notes:
11 June 2015
20:45 UTC+8

| Malaysia | 1–1 Forfeited (Note: The match between Malaysia v Timor-Leste was forfeited due to the use of falsified documents for their players of Timor-Leste.) | Timor-Leste |
|---|---|---|
| Safee 34' | Report (FIFA); Report (AFC) | Saro 90+3' |

Bukit Jalil National Stadium, Kuala Lumpur
Attendance: 5,000
Referee: Jarred Gillett (Australia)
11 June 2015 (Note: The fixtures between Saudi Arabia and Palestine were switched after Saudi Arabia cited "exceptional conditions" for their inability to travel to the West Bank. The return fixture, originally to be played on 13 October 2015 at the Faisal Al-Husseini International Stadium, Al-Ram, was later postponed by Saudi Arabia's refusal to pass through Israeli-controlled borders, until the process of agreeing on the venue was concluded. The match was rescheduled to be played on 5 November 2015 in Palestine, after the Palestinian Football Association gave full security guarantees for the match. The match was later further delayed until 9 November, and to be changed to a neutral venue in Asia, as the Palestinian government confirmed that it could no longer guarantee the safety and security for the match. The neutral venue was announced to be Amman International Stadium in Amman, Jordan.)
21:00 UTC+3

| Saudi Arabia | 3–2 | Palestine |
|---|---|---|
| Al-Shehri 6'; Al-Sahlawi 46', 90+4' | Report (FIFA); Report (AFC) | Tamburrini 51'; Jadue 90+1' |

Prince Mohamed bin Fahd Stadium, Dammam
Attendance: 4,820
Referee: Abdulrahman Al-Jassim (Qatar)

16 June 2015
16:00 UTC+8

| Timor-Leste | 0–1 Forfeited (Note: The match between Timor-Leste v United Arab Emirates was forfeited due to the use of falsified documents for their players of Timor-Leste.) | United Arab Emirates |
|---|---|---|
| | Report (FIFA); Report (AFC) | O. Abdulrahman 80' |

Shah Alam Stadium, Shah Alam (Malaysia) (Note: Timor-Leste played their home match against the United Arab Emirates in Malaysia for the lack of a suitable venue in Dili.)
Attendance: 200
Referee: Ma Ning (China)
16 June 2015
20:45 UTC+8

| Malaysia | 0–6 | Palestine |
|---|---|---|
| | Report (FIFA); Report (AFC) | Al-Battat 9'; Maraaba 22', 75'; Seyam 41', 86'; Yousef 63' |

Bukit Jalil National Stadium, Kuala Lumpur
Attendance: 3,000
Referee: Kim Sang-woo (South Korea)

3 September 2015
19:15 UTC+4

| United Arab Emirates | 10–0 | Malaysia |
|---|---|---|
| Salem 16'; Mabkhout 22', 33', 76'; Khalil 24', 29', 70', 78'; Fardan 25'; Ahmed 37' | Report (FIFA); Report (AFC) |

Mohammed Bin Zayed Stadium, Abu Dhabi
Attendance: 7,822
Referee: Abdulrahman Al-Jassim (Qatar)
3 September 2015
20:40 UTC+3

| Saudi Arabia | 7–0 Forfeited (Note: The match between Timor-Leste v Saudi Arabia was forfeited due to the use of falsified documents for their players of Timor-Leste.) | Timor-Leste |
|---|---|---|
| Al-Shehri 2'; Al-Sahlawi 23' (pen.), 26', 71'; Al-Faraj 30'; Al-Jassim 32'; Al-Muwallad 73' | Report (FIFA); Report (AFC) |

King Abdullah Sports City, Jeddah
Attendance: 11,000
Referee: Timur Faizullin (Kyrgyzstan)

8 September 2015
20:45 UTC+8

| Malaysia | 0–3 Awarded (Note: Match abandoned after 87 minutes due to a group of supporters throwing flares at the pitch. A month later, FIFA awarded Saudi Arabia 3–0 win.) | Saudi Arabia |
|---|---|---|
| Safiq 70' | Report (FIFA); Report (AFC) | Al-Jassim 73'; Al-Sahlawi 76' |

Shah Alam Stadium, Shah Alam
Attendance: 7,000
Referee: Liu Kwok Man (Hong Kong)
8 September 2015
17:00 UTC+3

| Palestine | 0–0 | United Arab Emirates |
|---|---|---|
| | Report (FIFA); Report (AFC) |

Faisal Al-Husseini International Stadium, Al-Ram
Attendance: 15,000
Referee: Ali Sabah Adday Al-Qaysi (Iraq)

8 October 2015
16:00 UTC+9

| Timor-Leste | 1–1 Forfeited (Note: The match between Timor-Leste v Palestine was forfeited due to the use of falsified documents for their players of Timor-Leste.) | Palestine |
|---|---|---|
| Saro 54' | Report (FIFA); Report (AFC) | Abu Nahyeh 90+2' |

Dili Municipal Stadium, Dili
Attendance: 2,000
Referee: Kim Dong-jin (South Korea)
8 October 2015
20:00 UTC+3

| Saudi Arabia | 2–1 | United Arab Emirates |
|---|---|---|
| Al-Sahlawi 45', 90' (pen.) | Report (FIFA); Report (AFC) | Khalil 18' |

King Abdullah Sports City, Jeddah
Attendance: 32,482
Referee: Muhammad Taqi Aljaafari Bin Jahari (Singapore)

13 October 2015
16:00 UTC+9

| Timor-Leste | 0–1 Forfeited (Note: The match between Timor-Leste v Malaysia was forfeited due to the use of falsified documents for their players of Timor-Leste.) | Malaysia |
|---|---|---|
| | Report (FIFA); Report (AFC) | Amri 10' |

Dili Municipal Stadium, Dili
Attendance: 2,500
Referee: Kim Hee-gon (South Korea)

9 November 2015
16:00 UTC+2

| Palestine | 0–0 | Saudi Arabia |
|---|---|---|
| | Report (FIFA); Report (AFC) |

Amman International Stadium, Amman (Jordan) (Note: The home matches of Palestine against Saudi Arabia and Malaysia were played on neutral ground as the Palestinian government confirmed that it could no longer guarantee the safety and security for the matches. The neutral venue was announced to be Amman International Stadium in Amman, Jordan.)
Attendance: 10,000
Referee: Adham Makhadmeh (Jordan)

12 November 2015
16:00 UTC+2

| Palestine | 6–0 | Malaysia |
|---|---|---|
| Cantillana 37'; Abu Nahyeh 38', 45', 58'; Seyam 88'; Ihbeisheh 90+1' | Report (FIFA); Report (AFC) |

Amman International Stadium, Amman (Jordan)
Attendance: 9,772
Referee: Ahmed Al-Kaf (Oman)
12 November 2015
18:15 UTC+4

| United Arab Emirates | 8–0 | Timor-Leste |
|---|---|---|
| Mabkhout 15', 19'; Khalil 43', 53' (pen.), 56', 57'; Ali 54'; Al Hashmi 87' | Report (FIFA); Report (AFC) |

Mohammed Bin Zayed Stadium, Abu Dhabi
Attendance: 7,870
Referee: Mohsen Torky (Iran)

17 November 2015
16:00 UTC+9

| Timor-Leste | 0–10 | Saudi Arabia |
|---|---|---|
| | Report (FIFA); Report (AFC) | Al-Sahlawi 29' (pen.), 42', 55' (pen.), 70', 89'; Hawsawi 34'; Al-Shehri 35'; Al-Jassim 85'; Hazazi 90'; Al-Muwallad 90+2' |

Dili Municipal Stadium, Dili
Attendance: 2,000
Referee: Alan Milliner (Australia)
17 November 2015
20:45 UTC+8

| Malaysia | 1–2 | United Arab Emirates |
|---|---|---|
| Baddrol 59' | Report (FIFA); Report (AFC) | O. Abdulrahman 22'; Khalil 52' |

Shah Alam Stadium, Shah Alam
Attendance: 100
Referee: Masaaki Toma (Japan)

24 March 2016
19:00 UTC+4

| United Arab Emirates | 2–0 | Palestine |
|---|---|---|
| Al Hammadi 33'; Khalil 60' (pen.) | Report (FIFA); Report (AFC) |

Mohammed Bin Zayed Stadium, Abu Dhabi
Attendance: 15,822
Referee: Ben Williams (Australia)
24 March 2016
20:30 UTC+3

| Saudi Arabia | 2–0 | Malaysia |
|---|---|---|
| Al-Sahlawi 50'; Al-Jassim 74' | Report (FIFA); Report (AFC) |

King Abdullah Sports City, Jeddah
Attendance: 34,839
Referee: Kim Dong-jin (South Korea)

29 March 2016
17:00 UTC+3

| Palestine | 7–0 | Timor-Leste |
|---|---|---|
| Ihbeisheh 2'; Cantillana 18', 66'; Pinto 32', 39'; Awad 77'; Bahdari 90' | Report (FIFA); Report (AFC) |

Dora International Stadium, Hebron
Attendance: 6,000
Referee: Hettikamkanamge Perera (Sri Lanka)
29 March 2016
19:00 UTC+4

| United Arab Emirates | 1–1 | Saudi Arabia |
|---|---|---|
| O. Abdulrahman 52' | Report (FIFA); Report (AFC) | Al-Jassim 24' |

Mohammed Bin Zayed Stadium, Abu Dhabi
Attendance: 32,325
Referee: Nawaf Shukralla (Bahrain)

== Group B ==
| Pos | Team | Pld | W | D | L | GF | GA | GD | Pts | Qualification | Australia | Jordan | Kyrgyzstan | Tajikistan | Bangladesh |
|---|---|---|---|---|---|---|---|---|---|---|---|---|---|---|---|
| 1 | Australia | 8 | 7 | 0 | 1 | 29 | 4 | +25 | 21 | World Cup qualifying third round and Asian Cup | — | 5–1 | 3–0 | 7–0 | 5–0 |
| 2 | Jordan | 8 | 5 | 1 | 2 | 21 | 7 | +14 | 16 | Asian Cup qualifying third round | 2–0 | — | 0–0 | 3–0 | 8–0 |
| 3 | Kyrgyzstan | 8 | 4 | 2 | 2 | 10 | 8 | +2 | 14 | Asian Cup qualifying third round | 1–2 | 1–0 | — | 2–2 | 2–0 |
| 4 | Tajikistan | 8 | 1 | 2 | 5 | 9 | 20 | −11 | 5 | Asian Cup qualifying play-off round | 0–3 | 1–3 | 0–1 | — | 5–0 |
| 5 | Bangladesh | 8 | 0 | 1 | 7 | 2 | 32 | −30 | 1 | Asian Cup qualifying play-off round | 0–4 | 0–4 | 1–3 | 1–1 | — |

Rules for classification: Qualification tiebreakers
11 June 2015
17:00 UTC+6

| Bangladesh | 1–3 | Kyrgyzstan |
|---|---|---|
| Kichin 32' (o.g.) | Report (FIFA); Report (AFC) | Zemlianukhin 9', 41'; Bernhardt 29' (pen.) |

Bangabandhu National Stadium, Dhaka
Attendance: 10,000
Referee: Sukhbir Singh (Singapore)
11 June 2015
20:00 UTC+5

| Tajikistan | 1–3 | Jordan |
|---|---|---|
| M. Dzhalilov 66' | Report (FIFA); Report (AFC) | Abdel-Fattah 29', 63', 88' |

Pamir Stadium, Dushanbe
Attendance: 19,000
Referee: Mohsen Torky (Iran)

16 June 2015
17:00 UTC+6

| Bangladesh | 1–1 | Tajikistan |
|---|---|---|
| Ameli 50' | Report (FIFA); Report (AFC) | Fatkhuloev 88' |

Bangabandhu National Stadium, Dhaka
Attendance: 12,000
Referee: Lee Min-hu (South Korea)
16 June 2015
20:00 UTC+6

| Kyrgyzstan | 1–2 | Australia |
|---|---|---|
| Mirzaliev 90+2' | Report (FIFA); Report (AFC) | Jedinak 2'; Oar 68' |

Spartak Stadium, Bishkek
Attendance: 18,000
Referee: Khamis Al-Marri (Qatar)

3 September 2015
19:00 UTC+8

| Australia | 5–0 | Bangladesh |
|---|---|---|
| Leckie 6'; Rogic 8', 20'; Burns 29'; Mooy 61' | Report (FIFA); Report (AFC) |

Perth Oval, Perth
Attendance: 19,495
Referee: Võ Minh Trí (Vietnam)
3 September 2015
19:00 UTC+3

| Jordan | 0–0 | Kyrgyzstan |
|---|---|---|
| | Report (FIFA); Report (AFC) |

Amman International Stadium, Amman
Attendance: 5,012
Referee: Mohd Amirul Izwan Yaacob (Malaysia)

8 September 2015
17:00 UTC+6

| Bangladesh | 0–4 | Jordan |
|---|---|---|
| | Report (FIFA); Report (AFC) | Deeb 13' (pen.), 56'; Abu Amarah 33'; Al-Bakhit 58' |

Bangabandhu National Stadium, Dhaka
Attendance: 12,000
Referee: Yu Ming-hsun (Chinese Taipei)
8 September 2015
18:00 UTC+5

| Tajikistan | 0–3 | Australia |
|---|---|---|
| | Report (FIFA); Report (AFC) | Milligan 57'; Cahill 73', 90+1' |

Pamir Stadium, Dushanbe
Attendance: 19,000
Referee: Jameel Abdulhusin (Bahrain)

8 October 2015
17:00 UTC+3

| Jordan | 2–0 | Australia |
|---|---|---|
| Abdel-Fattah 47' (pen.); Al-Dardour 84' | Report (FIFA); Report (AFC) |

Amman International Stadium, Amman
Attendance: 11,462
Referee: Masaaki Toma (Japan)
8 October 2015
20:00 UTC+6

| Kyrgyzstan | 2–2 | Tajikistan |
|---|---|---|
| Duyshobekov 7'; Zemlianukhin 90+4' (pen.) | Report (FIFA); Report (AFC) | M. Dzhalilov 65'; Nazarov 71' (pen.) |

Spartak Stadium, Bishkek
Attendance: 17,600
Referee: Mooud Bonyadifar (Iran)

13 October 2015
20:00 UTC+6

| Kyrgyzstan | 2–0 | Bangladesh |
|---|---|---|
| Lux 27'; Amirov 89' | Report (FIFA); Report (AFC) |

Spartak Stadium, Bishkek
Attendance: 12,001
Referee: Jameel Abdulhusin (Bahrain)
13 October 2015
19:00 UTC+3

| Jordan | 3–0 | Tajikistan |
|---|---|---|
| Al-Dardour 65', 90+4'; Abdel-Fattah 67' | Report (FIFA); Report (AFC) |

Amman International Stadium, Amman
Attendance: 15,000
Referee: Abdullah Al Hilali (Oman)

12 November 2015
20:00 UTC+11

| Australia | 3–0 | Kyrgyzstan |
|---|---|---|
| Jedinak 40' (pen.); Cahill 50'; Amirov 69' (o.g.) | Report (FIFA); Report (AFC) |

Canberra Stadium, Canberra
Attendance: 19,412
Referee: Kim Sang-woo (South Korea)
12 November 2015
17:00 UTC+5

| Tajikistan | 5–0 | Bangladesh |
|---|---|---|
| M. Dzhalilov 16', 26', 59', 74'; Nazarov 51' (pen.) | Report (FIFA); Report (AFC) |

Pamir Stadium, Dushanbe
Attendance: 5,500
Referee: Ali Sabah Adday Al-Qaysi (Iraq)

17 November 2015
17:30 UTC+6

| Bangladesh | 0–4 | Australia |
|---|---|---|
| | Report (FIFA); Report (AFC) | Cahill 6', 32', 37'; Jedinak 43' |

Bangabandhu National Stadium, Dhaka
Attendance: 19,730
Referee: Wang Di (China)
17 November 2015
20:00 UTC+6

| Kyrgyzstan | 1–0 | Jordan |
|---|---|---|
| Zemlianukhin 48' | Report (FIFA); Report (AFC) |

Spartak Stadium, Bishkek
Attendance: 14,000
Referee: Çarymyrat Kurbanow (Turkmenistan)

24 March 2016
19:30 UTC+10:30

| Australia | 7–0 | Tajikistan |
|---|---|---|
| Luongo 3'; Jedinak 13' (pen.); Milligan 57' (pen.); Burns 67', 87'; Rogic 70', 72' | Report (FIFA); Report (AFC) |

Adelaide Oval, Adelaide
Attendance: 35,439
Referee: Fahad Al-Marri (Qatar)
24 March 2016
14:30 UTC+2

| Jordan | 8–0 | Bangladesh |
|---|---|---|
| Al-Dardour 7', 23', 40'; Deeb 29' (pen.); Al-Rawashdeh 32'; Faisal 63'; Al-Naber 82'; Samir 90+2' (pen.) | Report (FIFA); Report (AFC) |

Amman International Stadium, Amman
Attendance: 6,000
Referee: Muhammad Taqi Aljaafari Bin Jahari (Singapore)

29 March 2016
20:00 UTC+11

| Australia | 5–1 | Jordan |
|---|---|---|
| Cahill 24', 44'; Mooy 39'; Rogic 53'; Luongo 69' | Report (FIFA); Report (AFC) | Deeb 90' |

Sydney Football Stadium, Sydney
Attendance: 24,975
Referee: Kim Jong-hyeok (South Korea)
29 March 2016
18:00 UTC+5

| Tajikistan | 0–1 | Kyrgyzstan |
|---|---|---|
| | Report (FIFA); Report (AFC) | Lux 18' |

Pamir Stadium, Dushanbe
Attendance: 7,500
Referee: Aziz Asimov (Uzbekistan)

== Group C ==
| Pos | Team | Pld | W | D | L | GF | GA | GD | Pts | Qualification | Qatar | People's Republic of China | Hong Kong | Maldives | Bhutan |
|---|---|---|---|---|---|---|---|---|---|---|---|---|---|---|---|
| 1 | Qatar | 8 | 7 | 0 | 1 | 29 | 4 | +25 | 21 | World Cup qualifying third round and Asian Cup | — | 1–0 | 2–0 | 4–0 | 15–0 |
| 2 | China | 8 | 5 | 2 | 1 | 27 | 1 | +26 | 17 | World Cup qualifying third round and Asian Cup | 2–0 | — | 0–0 | 4–0 | 12–0 |
| 3 | Hong Kong | 8 | 4 | 2 | 2 | 13 | 5 | +8 | 14 | Asian Cup qualifying third round | 2–3 | 0–0 | — | 2–0 | 7–0 |
| 4 | Maldives | 8 | 2 | 0 | 6 | 8 | 20 | −12 | 6 | Asian Cup qualifying play-off round | 0–1 | 0–3 | 0–1 | — | 4–2 |
| 5 | Bhutan | 8 | 0 | 0 | 8 | 5 | 52 | −47 | 0 | Asian Cup qualifying play-off round | 0–3 | 0–6 | 0–1 | 3–4 | — |

Rules for classification: Qualification tiebreakers
11 June 2015
20:00 UTC+8

| Hong Kong | 7–0 | Bhutan |
|---|---|---|
| McKee 19', 57'; Christian 23'; Lo Kwan Yee 30'; Ju Yingzhi 42'; Lam Ka Wai 49' (pen.); Godfred 67' | Report (FIFA); Report (AFC) |

Mong Kok Stadium, Hong Kong
Attendance: 6,326
Referee: Çarymyrat Kurbanow (Turkmenistan)
11 June 2015
21:00 UTC+5

| Maldives | 0–1 | Qatar |
|---|---|---|
| | Report (FIFA); Report (AFC) | Abdul Maqsoud 90+8' |

National Football Stadium, Malé
Attendance: 9,000
Referee: Yudai Yamamoto (Japan)

16 June 2015
18:00 UTC+6

| Bhutan | 0–6 | China |
|---|---|---|
| | Report (FIFA); Report (AFC) | Yang Xu 45+2', 60', 76'; Wu Lei 55'; Yu Dabao 67', 83' |

Changlimithang Stadium, Thimphu
Attendance: 10,000
Referee: Rowan Arumughan (India)
16 June 2015
20:00 UTC+8

| Hong Kong | 2–0 | Maldives |
|---|---|---|
| Xu Deshuai 63'; Lam Ka Wai 67' | Report (FIFA); Report (AFC) |

Mong Kok Stadium, Hong Kong
Attendance: 6,370
Referee: Adham Makhadmeh (Jordan)

3 September 2015
19:35 UTC+8

| China | 0–0 | Hong Kong |
|---|---|---|
| | Report (FIFA); Report (AFC) |

Bao'an Stadium, Shenzhen
Attendance: 26,173
Referee: Strebre Delovski (Australia)
3 September 2015
19:00 UTC+3

| Qatar | 15–0 | Bhutan |
|---|---|---|
| Musa 8', 28'; Kasola 18'; Assadalla 21', 45', 63'; Al-Haydos 25', 87'; Muntari 37', 41', 48'; Afif 57'; Khoukhi 62', 70'; Mohammad 75' | Report (FIFA); Report (AFC) |

Jassim Bin Hamad Stadium, Doha
Attendance: 2,022
Referee: Mohammad Abu Loum (Jordan)

8 September 2015
19:35 UTC+8

| Maldives | 0–3 | China |
|---|---|---|
| | Report (FIFA); Report (AFC) | Yu Dabao 8', 57'; Zhang Linpeng 66' |

Shenyang Olympic Sports Center Stadium, Shenyang (China) (Note: Maldives played their home match against China PR in China because of the poor condition of the National Football Stadium.)
Attendance: 28,036
Referee: Sukhbir Singh (Singapore)
8 September 2015
20:00 UTC+8

| Hong Kong | 2–3 | Qatar |
|---|---|---|
| Bai He 87'; Godfred 89' | Report (FIFA); Report (AFC) | Boudiaf 22'; Hassan 62'; Musa 84' |

Mong Kok Stadium, Hong Kong
Attendance: 6,396
Referee: Kim Sang-woo (South Korea)

8 October 2015
18:00 UTC+6

| Bhutan | 3–4 | Maldives |
|---|---|---|
| Dorji 85'; Gyeltshen 88'; Basnet 90+1' | Report (FIFA); Report (AFC) | Nashid 11'; Ashfaq 23', 33', 57' (pen.) |

Changlimithang Stadium, Thimphu
Attendance: 7,000
Referee: Tayeb Shamsuzzaman (Bangladesh)
8 October 2015
18:30 UTC+3

| Qatar | 1–0 | China |
|---|---|---|
| Boudiaf 22' | Report (FIFA); Report (AFC) |

Jassim Bin Hamad Stadium, Doha
Attendance: 7,730
Referee: Ko Hyung-jin (South Korea)

13 October 2015
18:00 UTC+6

| Bhutan | 0–1 | Hong Kong |
|---|---|---|
| | Report (FIFA); Report (AFC) | Chan Siu Ki 89' |

Changlimithang Stadium, Thimphu
Attendance: 7,280
Referee: Aziz Asimov (Uzbekistan)
13 October 2015
18:30 UTC+3

| Qatar | 4–0 | Maldives |
|---|---|---|
| Khoukhi 28', 70'; Kasola 69'; Musa 90+2' | Report (FIFA); Report (AFC) |

Jassim Bin Hamad Stadium, Doha
Attendance: 4,006
Referee: Ahmed Al-Kaf (Oman)

12 November 2015
15:50 UTC+5

| Maldives | 0–1 | Hong Kong |
|---|---|---|
| | Report (FIFA); Report (AFC) | Paulinho 13' (pen.) |

National Football Stadium, Malé
Attendance: 6,000
Referee: Ammar Al-Jeneibi (United Arab Emirates)
12 November 2015
19:35 UTC+8

| China | 12–0 | Bhutan |
|---|---|---|
| Mei Fang 10'; Yang Xu 13', 21' (pen.), 37', 52'; Yu Dabao 16', 39'; Yu Hanchao 34', 72'; Wang Yongpo 66', 81'; Zhang Xizhe 88' | Report (FIFA); Report (AFC) |

Helong Stadium, Changsha
Attendance: 27,358
Referee: Marai Al-Awaji (Saudi Arabia)

17 November 2015
18:00 UTC+6

| Bhutan | 0–3 | Qatar |
|---|---|---|
| | Report (FIFA); Report (AFC) | Muntari 22'; Al-Haydos 36', 90' |

Changlimithang Stadium, Thimphu
Attendance: 4,128
Referee: Ilgiz Tantashev (Uzbekistan)
17 November 2015
20:00 UTC+8

| Hong Kong | 0–0 | China |
|---|---|---|
| | Report (FIFA); Report (AFC) |

Mong Kok Stadium, Hong Kong
Attendance: 6,071
Referee: Nawaf Shukralla (Bahrain)

24 March 2016
19:35 UTC+8

| China | 4–0 | Maldives |
|---|---|---|
| Jiang Ning 2', 84', 90+1'; Yang Xu 12' | Report (FIFA); Report (AFC) |

Wuhan Sports Center Stadium, Wuhan
Attendance: 32,618
Referee: Ali Sabah Adday Al-Qaysi (Iraq)
24 March 2016
19:00 UTC+3

| Qatar | 2–0 | Hong Kong |
|---|---|---|
| Al-Haydos 20'; Soria 87' | Report (FIFA); Report (AFC) |

Jassim Bin Hamad Stadium, Doha
Attendance: 10,170
Referee: Dmitriy Mashentsev (Kyrgyzstan)

29 March 2016
20:15 UTC+8

| China | 2–0 | Qatar |
|---|---|---|
| Huang Bowen 57'; Wu Lei 88' | Report (FIFA); Report (AFC) |

Shaanxi Province Stadium, Xi'an
Attendance: 46,718
Referee: Mohd Amirul Izwan Yaacob (Malaysia)
29 March 2016
21:00 UTC+5

| Maldives | 4–2 | Bhutan |
|---|---|---|
| Asadhulla 37'; Ashfaq 81' (pen.), 90+4'; N. Hassan 87' | Report (FIFA); Report (AFC) | Gyeltshen 7'; Dorji 48' (pen.) |

National Football Stadium, Malé
Attendance: 4,102
Referee: Kim Sang-woo (South Korea)

== Group D ==
| Pos | Team | Pld | W | D | L | GF | GA | GD | Pts | Qualification | Iran | Oman | Turkmenistan | Guam | India |
|---|---|---|---|---|---|---|---|---|---|---|---|---|---|---|---|
| 1 | Iran | 8 | 6 | 2 | 0 | 26 | 3 | +23 | 20 | World Cup qualifying third round and Asian Cup | — | 2–0 | 3–1 | 6–0 | 4–0 |
| 2 | Oman | 8 | 4 | 2 | 2 | 11 | 7 | +4 | 14 | Asian Cup qualifying third round | 1–1 | — | 3–1 | 1–0 | 3–0 |
| 3 | Turkmenistan | 8 | 4 | 1 | 3 | 10 | 11 | −1 | 13 | Asian Cup qualifying third round | 1–1 | 2–1 | — | 1–0 | 2–1 |
| 4 | Guam | 8 | 2 | 1 | 5 | 3 | 16 | −13 | 7 | Asian Cup qualifying third round | 0–6 | 0–0 | 1–0 | — | 2–1 |
| 5 | India | 8 | 1 | 0 | 7 | 5 | 18 | −13 | 3 | Asian Cup qualifying play-off round | 0–3 (Note: FIFA awarded Iran a 3–0 win as a result of India fielding the ineligible player Eugeneson Lyngdoh. The match initially ended 3–0 to Iran.) | 1–2 | 1–2 | 1–0 | — |

Rules for classification: Qualification tiebreakers
Notes:
11 June 2015
16:15 UTC+10

| Guam | 1–0 | Turkmenistan |
|---|---|---|
| Annaorazow 12' (o.g.) | Report (FIFA); Report (AFC) |

Guam F.A. National Training Center, Dededo
Attendance: 3,000
Referee: Wang Di (China)
11 June 2015
19:00 UTC+5:30

| India | 1–2 | Oman |
|---|---|---|
| Chhetri 26' | Report (FIFA); Report (AFC) | Said 1'; Al-Hosni 40' (pen.) |

Sree Kanteerava Stadium, Bangalore
Attendance: 19,312
Referee: Ko Hyung-jin (South Korea)

16 June 2015
16:15 UTC+10

| Guam | 2–1 | India |
|---|---|---|
| McDonald 37'; Nicklaw 62' | Report (FIFA); Report (AFC) | Chhetri 90+3' |

Guam F.A. National Training Center, Dededo
Attendance: 3,277
Referee: Võ Minh Trí (Vietnam)
16 June 2015
18:00 UTC+5

| Turkmenistan | 1–1 | Iran |
|---|---|---|
| Mingazow 45+1' | Report (FIFA); Report (AFC) | Azmoun 4' |

Sport Toplumy Stadium, Daşoguz
Attendance: 10,000
Referee: Jameel Abdulhusin (Bahrain)

3 September 2015
19:00 UTC+4:30

| Iran | 6–0 | Guam |
|---|---|---|
| Dejagah 10' (pen.); Taremi 31', 65'; Azmoun 34', 41'; Torabi 89' | Report (FIFA); Report (AFC) |

Azadi Stadium, Tehran
Attendance: 11,232
Referee: Khamis Al-Marri (Qatar)
3 September 2015
19:00 UTC+4

| Oman | 3–1 | Turkmenistan |
|---|---|---|
| Saleh 7'; Saparow 11' (o.g.); Al-Hosni 59' | Report (FIFA); Report (AFC) | Amanow 82' |

Al-Seeb Stadium, Seeb
Attendance: 7,500
Referee: Muhammad Taqi Aljaafari Bin Jahari (Singapore)

8 September 2015
16:00 UTC+10

| Guam | 0–0 | Oman |
|---|---|---|
| | Report (FIFA); Report (AFC) |

Guam F.A. National Training Center, Dededo
Attendance: 2,239
Referee: Hiroyuki Kimura (Japan)
8 September 2015
19:00 UTC+5:30

| India | 0–3 Awarded (Note: FIFA awarded Iran a 3–0 win as a result of India fielding the ineligible player Eugeneson Lyngdoh. The match initially ended 3–0 to Iran.) | Iran |
|---|---|---|
| | Report (FIFA); Report (AFC) | Azmoun 28'; Teymourian 46'; Taremi 49' |

Sree Kanteerava Stadium, Bangalore
Attendance: 14,500
Referee: Ammar Al-Jeneibi (United Arab Emirates)

8 October 2015
18:00 UTC+5

| Turkmenistan | 2–1 | India |
|---|---|---|
| Abylow 8'; Amanow 60' | Report (FIFA); Report (AFC) | Lalpekhlua 28' |

Köpetdag Stadium, Ashgabat
Attendance: 20,100
Referee: Masoud Tufayelieh (Syria)
8 October 2015
18:30 UTC+4

| Oman | 1–1 | Iran |
|---|---|---|
| Al-Mukhaini 52' | Report (FIFA); Report (AFC) | Hosseini 70' |

Sultan Qaboos Sports Complex, Muscat
Attendance: 12,400
Referee: Valentin Kovalenko (Uzbekistan)

13 October 2015
18:00 UTC+5

| Turkmenistan | 1–0 | Guam |
|---|---|---|
| Abylow 16' | Report (FIFA); Report (AFC) |

Köpetdag Stadium, Ashgabat
Attendance: 20,200
Referee: Turki Al-Khudhayr (Saudi Arabia)
13 October 2015
18:30 UTC+4

| Oman | 3–0 | India |
|---|---|---|
| Mubarak 55'; Al-Muqbali 67', 84' | Report (FIFA); Report (AFC) |

Sultan Qaboos Sports Complex, Muscat
Attendance: 11,000
Referee: Fahad Al-Marri (Qatar)

12 November 2015
15:00 UTC+3:30

| Iran | 3–1 | Turkmenistan |
|---|---|---|
| Pouraliganji 6'; Ezatolahi 64'; Dejagah 83' (pen.) | Report (FIFA); Report (AFC) | Saparow 62' |

Azadi Stadium, Tehran
Attendance: 35,800
Referee: Kim Dong-jin (South Korea)
12 November 2015
19:00 UTC+5:30

| India | 1–0 | Guam |
|---|---|---|
| R. Singh 10' | Report (FIFA); Report (AFC) |

Sree Kanteerava Stadium, Bangalore
Attendance: 6,277
Referee: Jarred Gillett (Australia)

17 November 2015
15:30 UTC+10

| Guam | 0–6 | Iran |
|---|---|---|
| | Report (FIFA); Report (AFC) | Taremi 12', 63'; Kamyabinia 32'; Rezaeian 49'; Shojaei 52' (pen.); Ansarifard 53' |

Guam F.A. National Training Center, Dededo
Attendance: 2,087
Referee: Ho Wai Sing (Hong Kong)
17 November 2015
18:00 UTC+5

| Turkmenistan | 2–1 | Oman |
|---|---|---|
| Geworkýan 40'; Muhadow 67' | Report (FIFA); Report (AFC) | Al-Ghassani 70' |

Köpetdag Stadium, Ashgabat
Attendance: 23,100
Referee: Ma Ning (China)

24 March 2016
19:00 UTC+4:30

| Iran | 4–0 | India |
|---|---|---|
| Hajsafi 33' (pen.), 66' (pen.); Azmoun 61'; Jahanbakhsh 78' | Report (FIFA); Report (AFC) |

Azadi Stadium, Tehran
Attendance: 29,160
Referee: Võ Minh Trí (Vietnam)
24 March 2016
19:00 UTC+4

| Oman | 1–0 | Guam |
|---|---|---|
| Mubarak 53' | Report (FIFA); Report (AFC) |

Sultan Qaboos Sports Complex, Muscat
Attendance: 8,000
Referee: Jameel Abdulhusin (Bahrain)

29 March 2016
18:00 UTC+5:30

| India | 1–2 | Turkmenistan |
|---|---|---|
| Jhingan 26' | Report (FIFA); Report (AFC) | Amanow 48'; Ataýew 70' |

Jawaharlal Nehru Stadium, Kochi
Attendance: 3,111
Referee: Khamis Al-Marri (Qatar)
29 March 2016
19:00 UTC+4:30

| Iran | 2–0 | Oman |
|---|---|---|
| Azmoun 16', 23' | Report (FIFA); Report (AFC) |

Azadi Stadium, Tehran
Attendance: 33,850
Referee: Minoru Tōjō (Japan)

== Group E ==
| Pos | Team | Pld | W | D | L | GF | GA | GD | Pts | Qualification | Japan | United Arab Republic | Singapore | Afghanistan | Cambodia |
|---|---|---|---|---|---|---|---|---|---|---|---|---|---|---|---|
| 1 | Japan | 8 | 7 | 1 | 0 | 27 | 0 | +27 | 22 | World Cup qualifying third round and Asian Cup | — | 5–0 | 0–0 | 5–0 | 3–0 |
| 2 | Syria | 8 | 6 | 0 | 2 | 26 | 11 | +15 | 18 | World Cup qualifying third round and Asian Cup | 0–3 | — | 1–0 | 5–2 | 6–0 |
| 3 | Singapore | 8 | 3 | 1 | 4 | 9 | 9 | 0 | 10 | Asian Cup qualifying third round | 0–3 | 1–2 | — | 1–0 | 2–1 |
| 4 | Afghanistan | 8 | 3 | 0 | 5 | 8 | 24 | −16 | 9 | Asian Cup qualifying third round | 0–6 | 0–6 | 2–1 | — | 3–0 |
| 5 | Cambodia | 8 | 0 | 0 | 8 | 1 | 27 | −26 | 0 | Asian Cup qualifying play-off round | 0–2 | 0–6 | 0–4 | 0–1 | — |

Rules for classification: Qualification tiebreakers
11 June 2015
18:30 UTC+7

| Cambodia | 0–4 | Singapore |
|---|---|---|
| | Report (FIFA); Report (AFC) | Khairul 9'; Safuwan 21', 35'; Fazrul 55' |

Olympic Stadium, Phnom Penh
Attendance: 63,000
Referee: Liu Kwok Man (Hong Kong)
11 June 2015
20:00 UTC+4:30

| Afghanistan | 0–6 | Syria |
|---|---|---|
| | Report (FIFA); Report (AFC) | Rafe 19', 35'; Ajan 42'; Al Hussain 70'; Malki 75'; Kharbin 90+4' (pen.) |

Samen Stadium, Mashhad (Iran) (Note: Afghanistan played their home matches in Iran because of security concerns from the War in Afghanistan.)
Attendance: 7,647
Referee: Ilgiz Tantashev (Uzbekistan)

16 June 2015 (Note: The fixtures between Japan and Singapore were switched because the Singapore National Stadium was booked on 16 June 2015 to host the closing ceremony of the 2015 Southeast Asian Games.)
19:30 UTC+9

| Japan | 0–0 | Singapore |
|---|---|---|
| | Report (FIFA); Report (AFC) |

Saitama Stadium 2002, Saitama
Attendance: 57,533
Referee: Mohanad Qasim Eesee Sarray (Iraq)
16 June 2015
18:30 UTC+7

| Cambodia | 0–1 | Afghanistan |
|---|---|---|
| | Report (FIFA); Report (AFC) | Zazai 86' |

Olympic Stadium, Phnom Penh
Attendance: 55,000
Referee: Marai Al-Awaji (Saudi Arabia)

3 September 2015
19:26 UTC+9

| Japan | 3–0 | Cambodia |
|---|---|---|
| Honda 28'; Yoshida 50'; Kagawa 61' | Report (FIFA); Report (AFC) |

Saitama Stadium 2002, Saitama
Attendance: 54,716
Referee: Kim Hee-gon (South Korea)
3 September 2015
20:00 UTC+4

| Syria | 1–0 | Singapore |
|---|---|---|
| Al-Jafal 59' | Report (FIFA); Report (AFC) |

Sultan Qaboos Sports Complex, Muscat (Oman) (Note: Syria played their home matches in Oman because of security concerns from the Syrian Civil War.)
Attendance: 100
Referee: Yousef Al-Marzouq (Kuwait)

8 September 2015
18:30 UTC+7

| Cambodia | 0–6 | Syria |
|---|---|---|
| | Report (FIFA); Report (AFC) | Kharbin 29', 39'; Malki 31'; Al-Mawas 44'; Midani 50'; Omari 81' |

Olympic Stadium, Phnom Penh
Attendance: 35,000
Referee: Wang Di (China)
8 September 2015
16:55 UTC+4:30

| Afghanistan | 0–6 | Japan |
|---|---|---|
| | Report (FIFA); Report (AFC) | Kagawa 10', 50'; Morishige 35'; Okazaki 57', 60'; Honda 74' |

Azadi Stadium, Tehran (Iran)
Attendance: 8,650
Referee: Khamis Al-Kuwari (Qatar)

8 October 2015
20:00 UTC+8

| Singapore | 1–0 | Afghanistan |
|---|---|---|
| Khairul 72' | Report (FIFA); Report (AFC) |

National Stadium, Singapore
Attendance: 5,400
Referee: Ng Chiu Kok (Hong Kong)
8 October 2015
17:00 UTC+4

| Syria | 0–3 | Japan |
|---|---|---|
| | Report (FIFA); Report (AFC) | Honda 55' (pen.); Okazaki 70'; Usami 88' |

Al-Seeb Stadium, Seeb (Oman)
Attendance: 680
Referee: Ravshan Irmatov (Uzbekistan)

13 October 2015
20:00 UTC+8

| Singapore | 2–1 | Cambodia |
|---|---|---|
| Faris 16'; Fazrul 47' | Report (FIFA); Report (AFC) | Suhana 65' |

National Stadium, Singapore
Attendance: 6,650
Referee: Kim Dae-yong (South Korea)
13 October 2015
20:00 UTC+4

| Syria | 5–2 | Afghanistan |
|---|---|---|
| Omari 9', 21', 83'; Al-Mawas 32', 90' | Report (FIFA); Report (AFC) | Amiri 44'; Shayesteh 78' |

Al-Seeb Stadium, Seeb (Oman)
Attendance: 200
Referee: Dmitriy Mashentsev (Kyrgyzstan)

12 November 2015
19:15 UTC+8

| Singapore | 0–3 | Japan |
|---|---|---|
| | Report (FIFA); Report (AFC) | Kanazaki 20'; Honda 26'; Yoshida 88' |

National Stadium, Singapore
Attendance: 33,868
Referee: Fahad Al-Mirdasi (Saudi Arabia)
12 November 2015
15:00 UTC+3:30

| Afghanistan | 3–0 | Cambodia |
|---|---|---|
| Zazai 42'; Amiri 78'; Amani 90+4' | Report (FIFA); Report (AFC) |

Takhti Stadium, Tehran (Iran)
Attendance: 2,585
Referee: Adham Makhadmeh (Jordan)

17 November 2015
20:00 UTC+8

| Singapore | 1–2 | Syria |
|---|---|---|
| Safuwan 89' (pen.) | Report (FIFA); Report (AFC) | Kharbin 20', 90+3' |

National Stadium, Singapore
Attendance: 7,468
Referee: Kim Jong-hyeok (South Korea)
17 November 2015
19:14 UTC+7

| Cambodia | 0–2 | Japan |
|---|---|---|
| | Report (FIFA); Report (AFC) | Laboravy 51' (o.g.); Honda 90' |

Olympic Stadium, Phnom Penh
Attendance: 29,871
Referee: Fu Ming (China)

24 March 2016
19:34 UTC+9

| Japan | 5–0 | Afghanistan |
|---|---|---|
| Okazaki 43'; Kiyotake 58'; Mukhammad 63' (o.g.); Yoshida 74'; Kanazaki 78' | Report (FIFA); Report (AFC) |

Saitama Stadium 2002, Saitama
Attendance: 48,967
Referee: Mohanad Qasim Eesee Sarray (Iraq)
24 March 2016
20:00 UTC+4

| Syria | 6–0 | Cambodia |
|---|---|---|
| Kharbin 7', 19'; Kallasi 57'; Makara 70' (o.g.); Al Hussain 80'; Malki 84' | Report (FIFA); Report (AFC) |

Al-Seeb Stadium, Seeb (Oman)
Attendance: 100
Referee: Chris Beath (Australia)

29 March 2016
15:00 UTC+4:30

| Afghanistan | 2–1 | Singapore |
|---|---|---|
| Amani 39'; Shirdel 79' | Report (FIFA); Report (AFC) | Fazrul 89' |

Takhti Stadium, Tehran (Iran)
Attendance: 24,500
Referee: Fu Ming (China)
29 March 2016
19:34 UTC+9

| Japan | 5–0 | Syria |
|---|---|---|
| Al Masri 17' (o.g.); Kagawa 66', 90'; Honda 86'; Haraguchi 90+3' | Report (FIFA); Report (AFC) |

Saitama Stadium 2002, Saitama
Attendance: 57,475
Referee: Alireza Faghani (Iran)

== Group F ==
| Pos | Team | Pld | W | D | L | GF | GA | GD | Pts | Qualification | Thailand | Iraq | Vietnam | Chinese Taipei for Olympic games | Indonesia |
|---|---|---|---|---|---|---|---|---|---|---|---|---|---|---|---|
| 1 | Thailand | 6 | 4 | 2 | 0 | 14 | 6 | +8 | 14 | World Cup qualifying third round and Asian Cup | — | 2–2 | 1–0 | 4–2 | Canc. |
| 2 | Iraq | 6 | 3 | 3 | 0 | 13 | 6 | +7 | 12 | World Cup qualifying third round and Asian Cup | 2–2 | — | 1–0 | 5–1 | Canc. |
| 3 | Vietnam | 6 | 2 | 1 | 3 | 7 | 8 | −1 | 7 | Asian Cup qualifying third round | 0–3 | 1–1 | — | 4–1 | Canc. |
| 4 | Chinese Taipei | 6 | 0 | 0 | 6 | 5 | 19 | −14 | 0 | Asian Cup qualifying play-off round | 0–2 | 0–2 | 1–2 | — | Canc. |
| 5 | Indonesia (Note: Indonesia was also drawn into this group, but on 30 May 2015 the country's football association was suspended due to governmental interference, and on 3 June 2015 the team was disqualified and all matches involving it were cancelled.) | 0 | 0 | 0 | 0 | 0 | 0 | 0 | 0 | Disqualified | Canc. | Canc. | Canc. | Canc. | — |

Rules for classification: Qualification tiebreakers
Notes:
24 May 2015 (Note: The Thailand v Vietnam match was brought forward from 11 June 2015, as it interfered with commitments for the 2015 Southeast Asian Games.)
19:00 UTC+7

| Thailand | 1–0 | Vietnam |
|---|---|---|
| Pokklaw 80' | Report (FIFA); Report (AFC) |

Rajamangala Stadium, Bangkok
Attendance: 40,500
Referee: Ben Williams (Australia)

16 June 2015
19:30 UTC+8

| Chinese Taipei | 0–2 | Thailand |
|---|---|---|
| | Report (FIFA); Report (AFC) | Teerasil 21', 39' |

Taipei Municipal Stadium, Taipei
Attendance: 18,168
Referee: Ali Shaban (Kuwait)

3 September 2015
17:00 UTC+4:30

| Iraq | 5–1 | Chinese Taipei |
|---|---|---|
| Adnan 37'; Hosni 59'; Yasin 80'; Mahmoud 88'; Meram 90+1' (pen.) | Report (FIFA); Report (AFC) | Wen Chih-hao 86' |

PAS Stadium, Tehran (Iran) (Note: Iraq played their home matches in Iran because of security concerns from the Iraqi Civil War.)
Attendance: 4,200
Referee: Yaqoob Abdul Baki (Oman)

8 September 2015
19:00 UTC+8

| Chinese Taipei | 1–2 | Vietnam |
|---|---|---|
| Wu Chun-ching 82' | Report (FIFA); Report (AFC) | Đinh Tiến Thành 53'; Trần Phi Sơn 90+2' |

Taipei Municipal Stadium, Taipei
Attendance: 20,239
Referee: Kim Dae-yong (South Korea)
8 September 2015
19:00 UTC+7

| Thailand | 2–2 | Iraq |
|---|---|---|
| Theerathon 80' (pen.); Mongkol 83' | Report (FIFA); Report (AFC) | Meram 34'; Mahmoud 49' |

Rajamangala Stadium, Bangkok
Attendance: 43,572
Referee: Masaaki Toma (Japan)

8 October 2015
19:00 UTC+7

| Vietnam | 1–1 | Iraq |
|---|---|---|
| Lê Công Vinh 25' | Report (FIFA); Report (AFC) | Mahmoud 90+7' (pen.) |

Mỹ Đình National Stadium, Hanoi
Attendance: 10,000
Referee: Chris Beath (Australia)

13 October 2015
19:00 UTC+7

| Vietnam | 0–3 | Thailand |
|---|---|---|
| | Report (FIFA); Report (AFC) | Kroekrit 29'; Đinh Tiến Thành 56' (o.g.); Theerathon 70' |

Mỹ Đình National Stadium, Hanoi
Attendance: 35,000
Referee: Nawaf Shukralla (Bahrain)

12 November 2015
19:00 UTC+7

| Thailand | 4–2 | Chinese Taipei |
|---|---|---|
| Teerasil 41'; Pokklaw 52'; Adisak 72'; Tana 74' | Report (FIFA); Report (AFC) | Yaki Yen 3'; Hung Kai-chun 65' |

Rajamangala Stadium, Bangkok
Attendance: 50,000
Referee: Dmitriy Mashentsev (Kyrgyzstan)

17 November 2015
19:00 UTC+8

| Chinese Taipei | 0–2 | Iraq |
|---|---|---|
| | Report (FIFA); Report (AFC) | Ismail 19'; Mahmoud 85' |

National Stadium, Kaohsiung
Attendance: 11,960
Referee: Jumpei Iida (Japan)

24 March 2016
19:00 UTC+7

| Vietnam | 4–1 | Chinese Taipei |
|---|---|---|
| Lê Công Vinh 8', 90+1'; Nguyễn Văn Toàn 29', 42' | Report (FIFA); Report (AFC) | Wu Chun-ching 7' |

Mỹ Đình National Stadium, Hanoi
Attendance: 18,350
Referee: Adham Makhadmeh (Jordan)
24 March 2016
18:30 UTC+4:30

| Iraq | 2–2 | Thailand |
|---|---|---|
| Kamel 66'; Adnan 90+5' | Report (FIFA); Report (AFC) | Mongkol 39'; Adisak 86' |

PAS Stadium, Tehran (Iran)
Attendance: 4,000
Referee: Abdulrahman Al-Jassim (Qatar)

29 March 2016
18:30 UTC+4:30

| Iraq | 1–0 | Vietnam |
|---|---|---|
| Abdul-Raheem 45+1' | Report (FIFA); Report (AFC) |

PAS Stadium, Tehran (Iran)
Attendance: 2,160
Referee: Peter Green (Australia)

== Group G ==
| Pos | Team | Pld | W | D | L | GF | GA | GD | Pts | Qualification | South Korea | Lebanon | Kuwait | Myanmar | Laos |
|---|---|---|---|---|---|---|---|---|---|---|---|---|---|---|---|
| 1 | South Korea | 8 | 8 | 0 | 0 | 27 | 0 | +27 | 24 | World Cup qualifying third round and Asian Cup | — | 1–0 | 3–0 (Note: During this stage the Kuwait Football Association was suspended after the country had failed to comply with a decision from FIFA that its sports law had to be changed. The three remaining matches involving Kuwait – away v Myanmar, home v Laos, and away v South Korea – were not played as scheduled, and were eventually awarded as 3–0 wins for Kuwait's opponents. Kuwait was also unable to compete in the Third round of the Asian Cup qualifying, to which it would have advanced based on its ranking.) | 4–0 | 8–0 |
| 2 | Lebanon | 8 | 3 | 2 | 3 | 12 | 6 | +6 | 11 | Asian Cup qualifying third round | 0–3 | — | 0–1 | 1–1 | 7–0 |
| 3 | Kuwait | 8 | 3 | 1 | 4 | 12 | 10 | +2 | 10 | Disqualified | 0–1 | 0–0 | — | 9–0 | 0–3 |
| 4 | Myanmar | 8 | 2 | 2 | 4 | 9 | 21 | −12 | 8 | Asian Cup qualifying third round | 0–2 | 0–2 | 3–0 | — | 3–1 |
| 5 | Laos | 8 | 1 | 1 | 6 | 6 | 29 | −23 | 4 | Asian Cup qualifying play-off round | 0–5 | 0–2 | 0–2 | 2–2 | — |

Rules for classification: Qualification tiebreakers
Notes:
11 June 2015
19:00 UTC+7

| Laos | 2–2 | Myanmar |
|---|---|---|
| Sayavutthi 81' (pen.), 83' | Report (FIFA); Report (AFC) | Zaw Min Tun 41'; Kyaw Zayar Win 85' |

New Laos National Stadium, Vientiane
Attendance: 1,500
Referee: Tan Hai (China)
11 June 2015
17:00 UTC+3

| Lebanon | 0–1 | Kuwait |
|---|---|---|
| | Report (FIFA); Report (AFC) | Nasser 86' |

Saida Municipal Stadium, Sidon
Attendance: 15,215
Referee: Valentin Kovalenko (Uzbekistan)

16 June 2015
19:00 UTC+7

| Myanmar | 0–2 | South Korea |
|---|---|---|
| | Report (FIFA); Report (AFC) | Lee Jae-sung 35'; Son Heung-min 67' |

Rajamangala Stadium, Bangkok (Thailand) (Note: Myanmar played their home matches in Thailand due to a sanction after a crowd incident during a 2014 FIFA World Cup qualifier against Oman. The sanction had originally banned the team from entering the competition, but the Myanmar FA filed an appeal to FIFA which was partially upheld.)
Attendance: 1,090
Referee: Ahmed Al-Kaf (Oman)
16 June 2015
19:00 UTC+7

| Laos | 0–2 | Lebanon |
|---|---|---|
| | Report (FIFA); Report (AFC) | Ghaddar 5'; Shamsin 75' |

New Laos National Stadium, Vientiane
Attendance: 2,500
Referee: Yu Ming-hsun (Chinese Taipei)

3 September 2015
20:00 UTC+9

| South Korea | 8–0 | Laos |
|---|---|---|
| Lee Chung-yong 9'; Son Heung-min 12', 74', 89'; Kwon Chang-hoon 30', 75'; Suk Hyun-jun 57'; Lee Jae-sung 90+4' | Report (FIFA); Report (AFC) |

Hwaseong Stadium, Hwaseong
Attendance: 30,205
Referee: Jumpei Iida (Japan)
3 September 2015
20:00 UTC+3

| Kuwait | 9–0 | Myanmar |
|---|---|---|
| Nasser 11', 18'; Maqseed 12'; Zayid 46'; Zaw Min Tun 56' (o.g.); Mashaan 61'; Al-Mutawa 69' (pen.), 88', 90+3' | Report (FIFA); Report (AFC) |

Abdullah bin Khalifa Stadium, Doha (Qatar) (Note: Kuwait played their home match against Myanmar in Qatar for unspecified reasons.)
Attendance: 550
Referee: Aziz Asimov (Uzbekistan)

8 September 2015
19:00 UTC+7

| Laos | 0–2 | Kuwait |
|---|---|---|
| | Report (FIFA); Report (AFC) | Nasser 31'; Al-Mutawa 84' (pen.) |

New Laos National Stadium, Vientiane
Attendance: 1,300
Referee: Sivakorn Pu-udom (Thailand)
8 September 2015
17:00 UTC+3

| Lebanon | 0–3 | South Korea |
|---|---|---|
| | Report (FIFA); Report (AFC) | Jang Hyun-soo 22' (pen.); Ali Hamam 26' (o.g.); Kwon Chang-hoon 60' |

Saida Municipal Stadium, Sidon
Attendance: 5,500
Referee: Dmitriy Mashentsev (Kyrgyzstan)

8 October 2015
19:00 UTC+7

| Myanmar | 0–2 | Lebanon |
|---|---|---|
| | Report (FIFA); Report (AFC) | Maatouk 28'; Atwi 90+3' |

Suphachalasai Stadium, Bangkok (Thailand)
Attendance: 3,056
Referee: Mohd Nafeez Abdul Wahab (Malaysia)
8 October 2015
17:55 UTC+3

| Kuwait | 0–1 | South Korea |
|---|---|---|
| | Report (FIFA); Report (AFC) | Koo Ja-cheol 12' |

Al Kuwait Sports Club Stadium, Kuwait City
Attendance: 12,350
Referee: Alireza Faghani (Iran)

13 October 2015
19:00 UTC+7

| Myanmar | 3–1 | Laos |
|---|---|---|
| Suan Lam Mang 13'; Kyaw Ko Ko 32'; Aung Thu 50' | Report (FIFA); Report (AFC) | Sayavutthi 2' |

Suphachalasai Stadium, Bangkok (Thailand)
Attendance: 6,500
Referee: Salah Abbas Alabbasi (Bahrain)
13 October 2015
19:30 UTC+3

| Kuwait | 0–0 | Lebanon |
|---|---|---|
| | Report (FIFA); Report (AFC) |

Al Kuwait Sports Club Stadium, Kuwait City
Attendance: 12,150
Referee: Ammar Al-Jeneibi (United Arab Emirates)

12 November 2015
20:00 UTC+9

| South Korea | 4–0 | Myanmar |
|---|---|---|
| Lee Jae-sung 18'; Koo Ja-cheol 30'; Jang Hyun-soo 82'; Nam Tae-hee 86' | Report (FIFA); Report (AFC) |

Suwon World Cup Stadium, Suwon
Attendance: 24,270
Referee: Khamis Al-Marri (Qatar)
12 November 2015
17:00 UTC+2

| Lebanon | 7–0 | Laos |
|---|---|---|
| Mohamad 27'; Antar 34'; Chaito 36', 90+3'; Hamam 42'; Maatouk 59'; Oumari 90' | Report (FIFA); Report (AFC) |

Saida Municipal Stadium, Sidon
Attendance: 2,000
Referee: Sivakorn Pu-udom (Thailand)

17 November 2015
19:00 UTC+7

| Laos | 0–5 | South Korea |
|---|---|---|
| | Report (FIFA); Report (AFC) | Ki Sung-yueng 3' (pen.), 33'; Son Heung-min 35', 67'; Suk Hyun-jun 43' |

New Laos National Stadium, Vientiane
Attendance: 3,000
Referee: Turki Al-Khudhayr (Saudi Arabia)
Not played (Note: The Myanmar v Kuwait match, originally to be played on 17 November 2015, 19:00 UTC+7, at the Rajamangala Stadium in Bangkok, Thailand, was not played as scheduled because of the suspension of the Kuwait Football Association by FIFA.)

| Myanmar | 3–0 Awarded (Note: The match scheduled for 17 November 2015 should be canceled (and awarded as a 3–0 win for Myanmar) as it did not take place because of the suspension of the Kuwait Football Association.) | Kuwait |
|---|---|---|
| | Report (FIFA); Report (AFC) |

24 March 2016
20:00 UTC+9

| South Korea | 1–0 | Lebanon |
|---|---|---|
| Lee Jeong-hyeop 90+3' | Report (FIFA); Report (AFC) |

Ansan Wa~ Stadium, Ansan
Attendance: 30,532
Referee: Ma Ning (China)
Not played (Note: The Kuwait v Laos match, originally to be played on 24 March 2016, 18:35 UTC+3, at the Al Kuwait Sports Club Stadium, Kuwait City, was not played as scheduled because of the suspension of the Kuwait Football Association by FIFA.)

| Kuwait | 0–3 Awarded (Note: The match scheduled for 24 March 2016 should be canceled (and awarded as a 3–0 win for Laos) as it did not take place because of the suspension of the Kuwait Football Association.) | Laos |
|---|---|---|
| | Report (FIFA); Report (AFC) |

29 March 2016
15:00 UTC+3

| Lebanon | 1–1 | Myanmar |
|---|---|---|
| El-Helwe 88' | Report (FIFA); Report (AFC) | Aung Thu 73' |

Saida Municipal Stadium, Sidon
Attendance: 3,470
Referee: Jumpei Iida (Japan)
Not played (Note: The South Korea v Kuwait match, originally to be played on 29 March 2016, 20:00 UTC+9, at the Daegu World Cup Stadium, Daegu, was not played as scheduled because of the suspension of the Kuwait Football Association by FIFA.)

| South Korea | 3–0 Awarded (Note: The match scheduled for 29 March 2016 should be canceled (and awarded as a 3–0 win for South Korea) as it did not take place because of the suspension of the Kuwait Football Association.) | Kuwait |
|---|---|---|
| | Report (FIFA); Report (AFC) |

== Group H ==
| Pos | Team | Pld | W | D | L | GF | GA | GD | Pts | Qualification | Uzbekistan | North Korea | Philippines | Bahrain | Yemen |
|---|---|---|---|---|---|---|---|---|---|---|---|---|---|---|---|
| 1 | Uzbekistan | 8 | 7 | 0 | 1 | 20 | 7 | +13 | 21 | World Cup qualifying third round and Asian Cup | — | 3–1 | 1–0 | 1–0 | 1–0 |
| 2 | North Korea | 8 | 5 | 1 | 2 | 14 | 8 | +6 | 16 | Asian Cup qualifying third round | 4–2 | — | 0–0 | 2–0 | 1–0 |
| 3 | Philippines | 8 | 3 | 1 | 4 | 8 | 12 | −4 | 10 | Asian Cup qualifying third round | 1–5 | 3–2 | — | 2–1 | 0–1 |
| 4 | Bahrain | 8 | 3 | 0 | 5 | 10 | 10 | 0 | 9 | Asian Cup qualifying third round | 0–4 | 0–1 | 2–0 | — | 3–0 |
| 5 | Yemen | 8 | 1 | 0 | 7 | 2 | 17 | −15 | 3 | Asian Cup qualifying play-off round | 1–3 | 0–3 (Note: FIFA awarded North Korea a 3–0 win as a result of Yemen fielding the ineligible player Mudir Al-Radaei, after North Korea had defeated Yemen 1–0. Al-Radaei failed to serve an automatic one match suspension for receiving two yellow cards earlier in the First round of the competition.) | 0–2 | 0–4 | — |

Rules for classification: Qualification tiebreakers
Notes:
11 June 2015
20:00 UTC+8

| Philippines | 2–1 | Bahrain |
|---|---|---|
| Bahadoran 50'; Patiño 60' | Report (FIFA); Report (AFC) | Al-Malood 90+3' |

Philippine Sports Stadium, Bocaue
Attendance: 6,000
Referee: Jumpei Iida (Japan)
11 June 2015
19:00 UTC+3

| Yemen | 0–3 Awarded (Note: FIFA awarded North Korea a 3–0 win as a result of Yemen fielding the ineligible player Mudir Al-Radaei, after North Korea had defeated Yemen by 1–0. Al-Radaei failed to serve an automatic one match suspension for receiving two yellow cards earlier in the First round of the competition.) | North Korea |
|---|---|---|
| | Report (FIFA); Report (AFC) | So Hyon-uk 71' |

Suheim Bin Hamad Stadium, Doha (Qatar) (Note: Yemen played their home matches in Qatar because of security concerns from the Saudi Arabian-led intervention in Yemen.)
Attendance: 3,200
Referee: Hettikamkanamge Perera (Sri Lanka)

16 June 2015
17:00 UTC+9

| North Korea | 4–2 | Uzbekistan |
|---|---|---|
| Pak Kwang-ryong 4'; Jang Kuk-chol 16'; Ro Hak-su 34'; Ri Hyok-chol 36' | Report (FIFA); Report (AFC) | Ismailov 53'; Rashidov 79' |

Kim Il-sung Stadium, Pyongyang
Attendance: 42,000
Referee: Mohd Amirul Izwan Yaacob (Malaysia)
16 June 2015
19:00 UTC+3

| Yemen | 0–2 | Philippines |
|---|---|---|
| | Report (FIFA); Report (AFC) | Bahadoran 52'; Ramsay 74' |

Suheim Bin Hamad Stadium, Doha (Qatar)
Attendance: 5,200
Referee: Dmitriy Mashentsev (Kyrgyzstan)

3 September 2015
19:00 UTC+5

| Uzbekistan | 1–0 | Yemen |
|---|---|---|
| Geynrikh 51' | Report (FIFA); Report (AFC) |

Pakhtakor Markaziy Stadium, Tashkent
Attendance: 15,000
Referee: Lee Min-hu (South Korea)
3 September 2015
18:40 UTC+3

| Bahrain | 0–1 | North Korea |
|---|---|---|
| | Report (FIFA); Report (AFC) | Jong Il-gwan 42' |

Bahrain National Stadium, Riffa
Attendance: 9,500
Referee: Mohsen Torky (Iran)

8 September 2015
20:00 UTC+8

| Philippines | 1–5 | Uzbekistan |
|---|---|---|
| Schröck 68' | Report (FIFA); Report (AFC) | Ahmedov 1'; Rashidov 14', 80'; Sergeev 43', 65' |

Philippine Sports Stadium, Bocaue
Attendance: 7,500
Referee: Peter Green (Australia)
8 September 2015
19:00 UTC+3

| Yemen | 0–4 | Bahrain |
|---|---|---|
| | Report (FIFA); Report (AFC) | Ali Baba 31' (pen.); Al-Husaini 45+1'; Omar 66'; Adnan 77' |

Grand Hamad Stadium, Doha (Qatar)
Attendance: 421
Referee: Turki Al-Khudhayr (Saudi Arabia)

8 October 2015
16:00 UTC+8:30

| North Korea | 0–0 | Philippines |
|---|---|---|
| | Report (FIFA); Report (AFC) |

Kim Il-sung Stadium, Pyongyang
Attendance: 41,000
Referee: Ma Ning (China)
8 October 2015
18:00 UTC+3

| Bahrain | 0–4 | Uzbekistan |
|---|---|---|
| | Report (FIFA); Report (AFC) | Sergeev 52'; Ahmedov 56'; Rashidov 66'; Shomurodov 90+5' |

Bahrain National Stadium, Riffa
Attendance: 5,000
Referee: Minoru Tōjō (Japan)

13 October 2015
16:00 UTC+8:30

| North Korea | 1–0 | Yemen |
|---|---|---|
| Jong Il-gwan 12' (pen.) | Report (FIFA); Report (AFC) |

Kim Il-sung Stadium, Pyongyang
Attendance: 41,000
Referee: Liu Kwok Man (Hong Kong)
13 October 2015
18:00 UTC+3

| Bahrain | 2–0 | Philippines |
|---|---|---|
| Abdullatif 53'; Adnan 61' | Report (FIFA); Report (AFC) |

Bahrain National Stadium, Riffa
Attendance: 3,050
Referee: Mohanad Qasim Eesee Sarray (Iraq)

12 November 2015
20:00 UTC+8

| Philippines | 0–1 | Yemen |
|---|---|---|
| | Report (FIFA); Report (AFC) | A. Al-Sarori 83' |

Rizal Memorial Stadium, Manila
Attendance: 6,478
Referee: Kim Hee-gon (South Korea)
12 November 2015
18:00 UTC+5

| Uzbekistan | 3–1 | North Korea |
|---|---|---|
| Sergeev 23'; Geynrikh 65'; Ahmedov 87' | Report (FIFA); Report (AFC) | Ri Hyok-chol 2' |

Pakhtakor Markaziy Stadium, Tashkent
Attendance: 27,135
Referee: Alireza Faghani (Iran)

17 November 2015
15:30 UTC+8:30

| North Korea | 2–0 | Bahrain |
|---|---|---|
| Pak Kwang-ryong 45+1' (pen.); Jong Il-gwan 90+3' | Report (FIFA); Report (AFC) |

Kim Il-sung Stadium, Pyongyang
Attendance: 45,000
Referee: Muhammad Taqi Aljaafari (Singapore)
17 November 2015
18:30 UTC+3

| Yemen | 1–3 | Uzbekistan |
|---|---|---|
| A. Al-Sarori 90+2' | Report (FIFA); Report (AFC) | Haydarov 7'; Djeparov 31'; Andreev 50' |

Grand Hamad Stadium, Doha (Qatar)
Attendance: 350
Referee: Abdullah Al Hilali (Oman)

24 March 2016
18:00 UTC+5

| Uzbekistan | 1–0 | Philippines |
|---|---|---|
| Ismailov 59' | Report (FIFA); Report (AFC) |

Bunyodkor Stadium, Tashkent
Attendance: 34,000
Referee: Ryuji Sato (Japan)
24 March 2016
18:30 UTC+3

| Bahrain | 3–0 | Yemen |
|---|---|---|
| Abdulatif 32' (pen.); Al-Malood 63'; Al Romaihi 90+2' | Report (FIFA); Report (AFC) |

Bahrain National Stadium, Riffa
Attendance: 1,000
Referee: Ahmed Al-Kaf (Oman)

29 March 2016
20:00 UTC+8

| Philippines | 3–2 | North Korea |
|---|---|---|
| Bahadoran 43'; Ott 84'; Ramsay 90' | Report (FIFA); Report (AFC) | So Kyong-jin 45+2'; Ri Hyok-chol 48' |

Rizal Memorial Stadium, Manila
Attendance: 7,350
Referee: Fahad Al-Mirdasi (Saudi Arabia)
29 March 2016
18:00 UTC+5

| Uzbekistan | 1–0 | Bahrain |
|---|---|---|
| Rashidov 50' | Report (FIFA); Report (AFC) |

Bunyodkor Stadium, Tashkent
Attendance: 34,000
Referee: Mohammed Abdulla Hassan Mohamed (United Arab Emirates)

== Ranking of runner-up teams ==
To determine the four best runner-up teams, the following criteria were used:

1. Points (3 points for a win, 1 point for a draw, 0 points for a loss)
2. Goal difference
3. Goals scored
4. Fair play points
5. Drawing of lots

As a result of Indonesia being disqualified by FIFA suspension, Group F contained only four teams compared to five teams in all other groups. Therefore, the results against the fifth-placed team were not counted when determining the ranking of the runner-up teams.

| Pos | Grp | Team | Pld | W | D | L | GF | GA | GD | Pts | Qualification |
|---|---|---|---|---|---|---|---|---|---|---|---|
| 1 | F | Iraq | 6 | 3 | 3 | 0 | 13 | 6 | +7 | 12 | World Cup qualifying third round and Asian Cup |
| 2 | E | Syria | 6 | 4 | 0 | 2 | 14 | 11 | +3 | 12 | World Cup qualifying third round and Asian Cup |
| 3 | A | United Arab Emirates (Note: United Arab Emirates already qualified for the Asian Cup as the host nation.) | 6 | 3 | 2 | 1 | 16 | 4 | +12 | 11 | World Cup qualifying third round |
| 4 | C | China | 6 | 3 | 2 | 1 | 9 | 1 | +8 | 11 | World Cup qualifying third round and Asian Cup |
| 5 | H | North Korea | 6 | 3 | 1 | 2 | 10 | 8 | +2 | 10 | Asian Cup qualifying third round |
| 6 | B | Jordan | 6 | 3 | 1 | 2 | 9 | 7 | +2 | 10 | Asian Cup qualifying third round |
| 7 | D | Oman | 6 | 2 | 2 | 2 | 6 | 6 | 0 | 8 | Asian Cup qualifying third round |
| 8 | G | Lebanon | 6 | 1 | 2 | 3 | 3 | 6 | −3 | 5 | Asian Cup qualifying third round |

Source: FIFA
Rules for classification: Counting only matches against teams ranked first to fourth in the group, 1) Points; 2) Goal difference; 3) Goals scored; 4) Fair play points; 5) Drawing of lots.

== Ranking of fourth-placed teams ==
To determine the four best fourth-placed teams, the following criteria were used:

1. Points (3 points for a win, 1 point for a draw, 0 points for a loss)
2. Goal difference
3. Goals scored
4. Fair play points
5. Drawing of lots

As a result of Indonesia being disqualified by FIFA suspension, Group F contained only four teams compared to five teams in all other groups. Therefore, the results against the fifth-placed team were not counted when determining the ranking of the fourth-placed teams.

| Pos | Grp | Team | Pld | W | D | L | GF | GA | GD | Pts | Qualification |
|---|---|---|---|---|---|---|---|---|---|---|---|
| 1 | D | Guam | 6 | 1 | 1 | 4 | 1 | 14 | −13 | 4 | Asian Cup qualifying third round |
| 2 | G | Myanmar | 6 | 1 | 1 | 4 | 4 | 18 | −14 | 4 | Asian Cup qualifying third round |
| 3 | H | Bahrain | 6 | 1 | 0 | 5 | 3 | 10 | −7 | 3 | Asian Cup qualifying third round |
| 4 | E | Afghanistan | 6 | 1 | 0 | 5 | 4 | 24 | −20 | 3 | Asian Cup qualifying third round |
| 5 | B | Tajikistan | 6 | 0 | 1 | 5 | 3 | 19 | −16 | 1 | Asian Cup qualifying play-off round |
| 6 | F | Chinese Taipei | 6 | 0 | 0 | 6 | 5 | 19 | −14 | 0 | Asian Cup qualifying play-off round |
| 7 | C | Maldives | 6 | 0 | 0 | 6 | 0 | 15 | −15 | 0 | Asian Cup qualifying play-off round |
| 8 | A | Malaysia | 6 | 0 | 0 | 6 | 1 | 29 | −28 | 0 | Asian Cup qualifying play-off round |

Source: FIFA
Rules for classification: Counting only matches against teams ranked first to fourth in the group, 1) Points; 2) Goal difference; 3) Goals scored; 4) Fair play points; 5) Drawing of lots.

== Goalscorers ==
There were 507 goals scored in 149 matches, for an average of 3.4 goals per match.

14 goals

- (Saudi Arabia) Mohammad Al-Sahlawi (Note: This player's goal tally included one or more goals which the player scored in matches that were subsequently forfeited, but which FIFA still continued to count in its statistics.)

11 goals

- (United Arab Emirates) Ahmed Khalil

8 goals

- (Australia) Tim Cahill
- (China) Yang Xu

7 goals

- (Iran) Sardar Azmoun
- (Syria) Omar Khribin

6 goals

- (China) Yu Dabao
- (Japan) Keisuke Honda
- (Jordan) Hamza Al-Dardour
- (South Korea) Son Heung-min
- (Tajikistan) Manuchekhr Dzhalilov

5 goals

- (Australia) Tom Rogic
- (Iran) Mehdi Taremi
- (Japan) Shinji Kagawa
- (Jordan) Hassan Abdel-Fattah
- (Maldives) Ali Ashfaq
- (Qatar) Hassan Al-Haydos
- (Saudi Arabia) Taisir Al-Jassim
- (United Arab Emirates) Ali Mabkhout
- (Uzbekistan) Sardor Rashidov

4 goals

- (Australia) Mile Jedinak
- (Iraq) Younis Mahmoud
- (Japan) Shinji Okazaki
- (Jordan) Abdallah Deeb
- (Kuwait) Bader Al-Mutawa
- (Kuwait) Yousef Nasser
- (Kyrgyzstan) Anton Zemlianukhin
- (Palestine) Ahmad Abu Nahyeh
- (Qatar) Boualem Khoukhi
- (Qatar) Mohammed Muntari
- (Qatar) Mohammed Musa
- (Syria) Osama Omari
- (Uzbekistan) Igor Sergeev

3 goals

- (Australia) Nathan Burns
- (China) Jiang Ning
- (Japan) Maya Yoshida
- (Laos) Khampheng Sayavutthi
- (North Korea) Ri Hyok-chol
- (North Korea) Jong Il-gwan
- (Palestine) Jonathan Cantillana
- (Palestine) Tamer Seyam
- (Philippines) Misagh Bahadoran
- (Qatar) Ali Assadalla
- (Saudi Arabia) Yahya Al-Shehri
- (Singapore) Safuwan Baharudin
- (Singapore) Fazrul Nawaz
- (South Korea) Kwon Chang-hoon
- (South Korea) Lee Jae-sung
- (Syria) Mahmoud Al-Mawas
- (Syria) Sanharib Malki
- (Thailand) Teerasil Dangda
- (Turkmenistan) Arslanmyrat Amanow
- (United Arab Emirates) Omar Abdulrahman
- (Uzbekistan) Odil Ahmedov
- (Vietnam) Lê Công Vinh

2 goals

- (Afghanistan) Khaibar Amani
- (Afghanistan) Norlla Amiri
- (Afghanistan) Mustafa Zazai
- (Australia) Massimo Luongo
- (Australia) Mark Milligan
- (Australia) Aaron Mooy
- (Bahrain) Ismail Abdullatif
- (Bahrain) Abdulwahab Al-Malood
- (Bahrain) Sayed Mohamed Adnan
- (Bhutan) Tshering Dorji
- (Bhutan) Chencho Gyeltshen
- (China) Wang Yongpo
- (China) Wu Lei
- (China) Yu Hanchao
- (Chinese Taipei) Wu Chun-ching
- (Hong Kong) Godfred Karikari
- (Hong Kong) Lam Ka Wai
- (Hong Kong) Jaimes McKee
- (India) Sunil Chhetri
- (Iran) Ashkan Dejagah
- (Iran) Ehsan Hajsafi
- (Iraq) Ali Adnan
- (Iraq) Justin Meram
- (Japan) Mu Kanazaki
- (Kyrgyzstan) Vitalij Lux
- (Lebanon) Hassan Chaito
- (Lebanon) Hassan Maatouk
- (Myanmar) Aung Thu
- (North Korea) Pak Kwang-ryong
- (Oman) Amad Al-Hosni
- (Oman) Ahmed Mubarak Al-Mahaijri
- (Oman) Abdulaziz Al-Muqbali
- (Palestine) Jaka Ihbeisheh
- (Palestine) Sameh Maraaba
- (Palestine) Yashir Pinto
- (Philippines) Iain Ramsay
- (Qatar) Karim Boudiaf
- (Qatar) Mohammed Kasola
- (Saudi Arabia) Fahad Al-Muwallad
- (Singapore) Khairul Amri
- (South Korea) Jang Hyun-soo
- (South Korea) Ki Sung-yueng
- (South Korea) Koo Ja-cheol
- (South Korea) Suk Hyun-jun
- (Syria) Abdelrazaq Al Hussain
- (Syria) Raja Rafe
- (Tajikistan) Akhtam Nazarov
- (Thailand) Pokklaw Anan
- (Thailand) Theerathon Bunmathan
- (Thailand) Adisak Kraisorn
- (Thailand) Mongkol Tossakrai
- (Timor-Leste) Ramon Saro
- (Turkmenistan) Guwanç Abylow
- (Uzbekistan) Alexander Geynrikh
- (Uzbekistan) Anzur Ismailov
- (Vietnam) Nguyễn Văn Toàn
- (Yemen) Ahmed Al-Sarori

1 goal

- (Afghanistan) Faysal Shayesteh
- (Afghanistan) Josef Shirdel
- (Australia) Mathew Leckie
- (Australia) Tommy Oar
- (Bahrain) Sami Al-Husaini
- (Bahrain) Hussain Ali Baba
- (Bahrain) Mohamed Al Romaihi
- (Bahrain) Abdullah Omar
- (Bangladesh) Jahid Hasan Ameli
- (Bhutan) Biren Basnet
- (Cambodia) Sos Suhana
- (China) Huang Bowen
- (China) Mei Fang
- (China) Zhang Linpeng
- (China) Zhang Xizhe
- (Chinese Taipei) Hung Kai-chun
- (Chinese Taipei) Wen Chih-hao
- (Chinese Taipei) Yaki Yen
- (Guam) Brandon McDonald
- (Guam) Travis Nicklaw
- (Hong Kong) Christian Annan
- (Hong Kong) Bai He
- (Hong Kong) Chan Siu Ki
- (Hong Kong) Ju Yingzhi
- (Hong Kong) Lo Kwan Yee
- (Hong Kong) Paulinho
- (Hong Kong) Xu Deshuai
- (India) Sandesh Jhingan
- (India) Jeje Lalpekhlua
- (India) Robin Singh
- (Iran) Karim Ansarifard
- (Iran) Saeid Ezatolahi
- (Iran) Jalal Hosseini
- (Iran) Alireza Jahanbakhsh
- (Iran) Kamal Kamyabinia
- (Iran) Morteza Pouraliganji
- (Iran) Ramin Rezaeian
- (Iran) Masoud Shojaei
- (Iran) Andranik Teymourian
- (Iran) Mehdi Torabi
- (Iraq) Mohannad Abdul-Raheem
- (Iraq) Ali Hosni
- (Iraq) Dhurgham Ismail
- (Iraq) Mahdi Kamel
- (Iraq) Ahmed Yasin
- (Japan) Genki Haraguchi
- (Japan) Hiroshi Kiyotake
- (Japan) Masato Morishige
- (Japan) Takashi Usami
- (Jordan) Munther Abu Amarah
- (Jordan) Yaseen Al-Bakhit
- (Jordan) Yousef Al-Naber
- (Jordan) Yousef Al-Rawashdeh
- (Jordan) Baha' Faisal
- (Jordan) Ahmed Samir
- (Kuwait) Ali Maqseed
- (Kuwait) Aziz Mashaan
- (Kuwait) Faisal Zayid
- (Kyrgyzstan) Ildar Amirov
- (Kyrgyzstan) Edgar Bernhardt
- (Kyrgyzstan) Bakhtiyar Duyshobekov
- (Kyrgyzstan) Almazbek Mirzaliev
- (Lebanon) Roda Antar
- (Lebanon) Abbas Ahmed Atwi
- (Lebanon) Hilal El-Helwe
- (Lebanon) Mohammed Ghaddar
- (Lebanon) Ali Hamam
- (Lebanon) Youssef Mohamad
- (Lebanon) Joan Oumari
- (Lebanon) Feiz Shamsin
- (Malaysia) Mohd Amri Yahyah
- (Malaysia) Baddrol Bakhtiar
- (Malaysia) Mohd Safiq Rahim
- (Malaysia) Safee Sali
- (Maldives) Asadhulla Abdulla
- (Maldives) Naiz Hassan
- (Maldives) Ahmed Nashid
- (Myanmar) Kyaw Ko Ko
- (Myanmar) Kyaw Zayar Win
- (Myanmar) Suan Lam Mang
- (Myanmar) Zaw Min Tun
- (North Korea) Jang Kuk-chol
- (North Korea) Ro Hak-su
- (North Korea) So Hyon-uk
- (North Korea) So Kyong-jin
- (Oman) Mohammed Al-Ghassani
- (Oman) Saad Al-Mukhaini
- (Oman) Qasim Said
- (Oman) Raed Ibrahim Saleh
- (Palestine) Musab Al-Battat
- (Palestine) Ahmed Awad
- (Palestine) Abdelatif Bahdari
- (Palestine) Matías Jadue
- (Palestine) Pablo Tamburrini
- (Palestine) Khader Yousef
- (Philippines) Manuel Ott
- (Philippines) Javier Patiño
- (Philippines) Stephan Schröck
- (Qatar) Akram Afif
- (Qatar) Abdelkarim Hassan
- (Qatar) Ahmed Abdul Maqsoud
- (Qatar) Ismaeel Mohammad
- (Qatar) Sebastián Soria
- (Saudi Arabia) Salman Al-Faraj
- (Saudi Arabia) Osama Hawsawi
- (Saudi Arabia) Naif Hazazi
- (Singapore) Faris Ramli
- (South Korea) Lee Chung-yong
- (South Korea) Lee Jeong-hyeop
- (South Korea) Nam Tae-hee
- (Syria) Moayad Ajan
- (Syria) Oday Al-Jafal
- (Syria) Ahmad Kallasi
- (Syria) Omar Midani
- (Tajikistan) Fatkhullo Fatkhuloev
- (Thailand) Tana Chanabut
- (Thailand) Kroekrit Thaweekarn
- (Turkmenistan) Serdaraly Ataýew
- (Turkmenistan) Artur Geworkýan
- (Turkmenistan) Ruslan Mingazow
- (Turkmenistan) Süleýman Muhadow
- (Turkmenistan) Mekan Saparow
- (United Arab Emirates) Mohamed Ahmed
- (United Arab Emirates) Ismail Al Hammadi
- (United Arab Emirates) Ahmed Al Hashmi
- (United Arab Emirates) Dawood Ali
- (United Arab Emirates) Habib Fardan
- (United Arab Emirates) Mohanad Salem
- (Uzbekistan) Stanislav Andreev
- (Uzbekistan) Server Djeparov
- (Uzbekistan) Azizbek Haydarov
- (Uzbekistan) Eldor Shomurodov
- (Vietnam) Đinh Tiến Thành
- (Vietnam) Trần Phi Sơn

1 own goal

- (Afghanistan) Sharif Mukhammad (against Japan)
- (Cambodia) Khoun Laboravy (against Japan)
- (Cambodia) Leng Makara (against Syria)
- (Kyrgyzstan) Ildar Amirov (against Australia)
- (Kyrgyzstan) Valery Kichin (against Bangladesh)
- (Lebanon) Ali Hamam (against South Korea)
- (Myanmar) Zaw Min Tun (against Kuwait)
- (Syria) Hamdi Al Masri (against Japan)
- (Turkmenistan) Serdar Annaorazow (against Guam)
- (Turkmenistan) Mekan Saparow (against Oman)
- (Vietnam) Đinh Tiến Thành (against Thailand)
