= Assad Aboudou =

Seychelles footballer

Personal information
- Full name: Assad Rynno Aboudou
- Date of birth: 3 January 2003 (age 23)
- Place of birth: Seychelles
- Position: Midfielder

Team information
- Current team: La Passe

Youth career
- 2021–2022: Trofense

Senior career*
Years	Team	Apps	(Gls)
2018–	La Passe		

International career^{‡}
2021–	Seychelles	2	(0)
- * Club domestic league appearances and goals ‡ National team caps and goals as of 00:08, 30 January 2022 (UTC)

Assad Aboudou (born 3 January 2003) is a Seychellois footballer who plays for La Passe FC and the Seychelles national team.

He is the twin brother of fellow footballer Affandi Aboudou.

== Club career ==
In November 2019, while a member of La Passe FC of the Seychelles First Division, Aboudou traveled to Germany for a two-week training stint with VfL Lohbrügge of the Landesliga Hamburg-Hansa. He was joined on the trip by his twin brother, Affandi, and Achille Esther.

In September 2021 it was announced that Assad and Affandi had traveled to Portugal for a three-month trial with C.D. Trofense of the Liga Portugal 2. During this time they were evaluated by the club and others from within and outside of the country. He returned to Portugal for a second stint in January 2022 and went on to appear in U19 league matches with the club.

Later in 2022 Aboudou returned to La Passé FC and participated in the 2022–23 CAF Champions League with the club.

== International career ==
In April 2018 Aboudou was part of the Seychelles football team that competed at the Indian Ocean Youth and Sports Commission Games in Djibouti.

He made his senior international debut on 1 September 2021 in a friendly against Comoros. He earned his second cap three days later against Burundi.

=== International career statistics ===
As of match played 4 September 2021

Seychelles national team
Year	Apps	Goals
2021	2	0
2022	0	0
Total	2	0
