= József Künsztler =

Hungarian footballer and manager

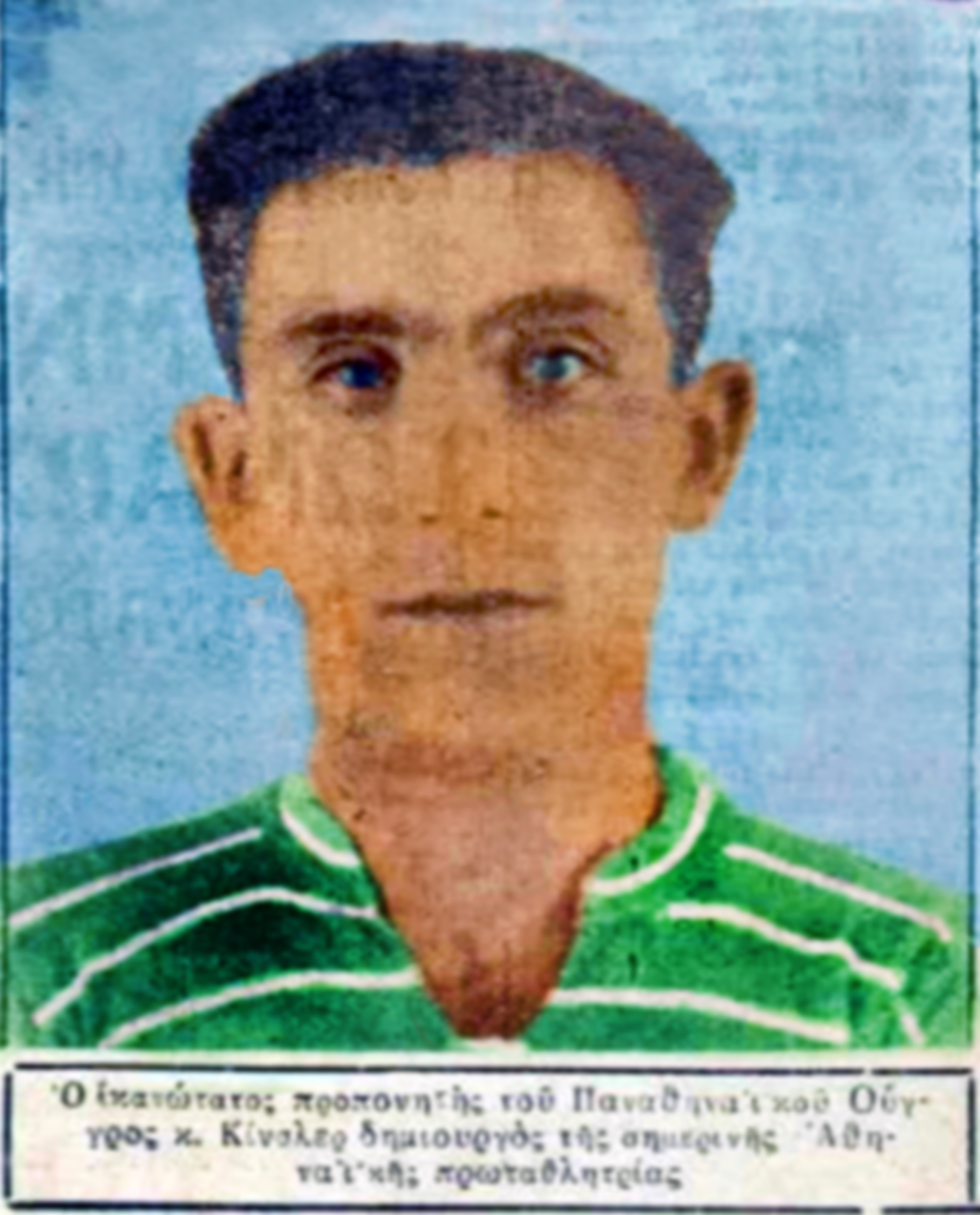

Personal information
- Birth name: Jozsef Kinszler
- Date of birth: 3 July 1897
- Place of birth: Budapest, Austria-Hungary
- Date of death: 1977
- Place of death: Nicosia, Cyprus
- Position: Winger

Senior career*
Years	Team	Apps	(Gls)
1915–1918	Nemzeti SK		
1918–1922	SC Union 03 Altona		
1926–1927	Újpest FC		
1927	III.Kerületi TVE		

Managerial career
- 1918–1922: SC Union 03 Altona
- 1928–1934: Panathinaikos
- 1934–1937: APOEL
- 1935–1936: Greece
- 1937–1939: Panathinaikos
- 1939–1941: APOEL
- 1945–1951: APOEL
- * Club domestic league appearances and goals

József Künsztler (1897 – 1977) was a Hungarian footballer and manager.

He served twice as the manager of Panathinaikos (1928 - 1934, 1936 - 1939) and is the longest-serving manager in the club's history. He won one Greek championship as manager with Panathinaikos in 1930 and 8 Cypriot championships with APOEL. Until today, he is the manager with the most championships in Cyprus.

He had a brief spell as coach of Greece National Team in 1936.

== Honours ==
- Greek Championships: 1930
- Athens Championships: 1929, 1930, 1931, 1934, 1937, 1939
- Cypriot Championships: 1936, 1937, 1938, 1939, 1940, 1947, 1948, 1949
- Cypriot Cups: 1937, 1941, 1947, 1951
