= Verbandsliga Hamburg-Germania =

- Founded: 1947 / 1953
- Folded: 1970
- Country: Germany
- Level on pyramid: Level 4
- Promotion to: Landesliga Hamburg
- Last champions: Union 03 Altona (1969–70)

The Verbandsliga Hamburg-Germania was the fourth tier of the German football league system and the second-highest league in the German state of Hamburg, together with the Verbandsliga Hamburg-Hansa and Verbandsliga Hamburg-Hammonia, until its disbanding in 1970.

== 1947 to 1950 ==
The league was formed in 1947, alongside three other divisions on the same level in the City of Hamburg, as the Bezirksklasse Hamburg-Germania. The other three leagues were:

- Bezirksklasse Hamburg-Hansa
- Bezirksklasse Hamburg-Hammonia
- Bezirksklasse Hamburg-Olympia

The four new leagues replaced the 1. Klasse Hamburg as the feeder leagues to the Stadtliga Hamburg, which was now renamed Verbandsliga Hamburg. The 1. Klasse Hamburg had been operating since the end of the Second World War in 1945 and consisted of three divisions. The change in the league system at this level came together with the establishment of the Oberliga Nord as the new tier-one league in Northern Germany. This meant the new Bezirksklasse in Hamburg was now the third tier of the league system, below Oberliga and Verbandsliga.

The league started out with eleven clubs, with the league champion being promoted to the Verbandsliga. In its second season, the league expanded to thirteen clubs. The league above it was renamed from Verbandsliga Hamburg to Amateurliga Hamburg at the end of this season. The year after, in 1950, the Amateurliga was then reduced to one single division from the two it had been operating at previously.

For the Bezirksklasse, this also meant a change: The four existing divisions were disbanded and replaced by two leagues:

- Bezirksklasse Hamburg-Alster
- Bezirksklasse Hamburg-Elbe

For the Germania-division (German: Germania-Staffel) this meant a temporary end to its operation.

== 1953 to 1970 ==
In 1953, the league was once more reestablished and the Elbe-Staffel and Alster-Staffel disbanded. Three of the four leagues in existence until 1950 were reformed, the Olympia-Staffel however, was not. The leagues were now named Verbandsligas:

- Verbandsliga Hamburg-Germania
- Verbandsliga Hamburg-Hansa
- Verbandsliga Hamburg-Hammonia

Each of the three divisions had now fourteen clubs and the league champion was again promoted directly to the Amateurliga Hamburg. The leagues were again the third tier of the German league system. In the fourteen-team per division era, usually the bottom two teams of each division were relegated. Additionally, teams would be moved between the three divisions according to geographical necessity, to balance them out.

In 1963, the Bundesliga was established in Germany. The old Oberliga Nord was disbanded and at its stead, the Regionalliga Nord was set as the second tier of the league system. The Amateurliga Hamburg, now renamed Landesliga Hamburg, slipped to third tier in the league system, making the three Verbandsligas the fourth tier now. Otherwise, nothing changed for the three leagues.

In the first couple of seasons after 1963, nothing changed for the three leagues.

In 1970, the Germania-Staffel was disbanded, leaving only the Hansa and Hammonia division on this level, as it is today.

Of the fifteen clubs in the league in 1969–70, the league winner was promoted to the Landesliga while the teams placed second to ninth were split between the other two divisions. The remainder of the clubs was relegated.

== Position of the Germania-Staffel in the league system ==
Years	League name	Tier	Promotion to
1947–48	Bezirksklasse Hamburg-Germania	III	Verbandsliga Hamburg
1948–50	Bezirksklasse Hamburg-Germania	III	Amateurliga Hamburg
1953–63	Verbandsliga Hamburg-Germania	III	Amateurliga Hamburg
1963–70	Verbandsliga Hamburg-Germania	IV	Landesliga Hamburg

== League champions ==
Season	Club
1947–48	ASV Bergedorf 85
1948–49	Wedeler TSV
1949–50	TSV Uetersen
1950–1953	no competition
1953–54	Eidelstedter SV
1954–55	Rasensport Elmshorn
1955–56	Grün-Weiß 07 Hamburg
1956–57	HEBC Hamburg
1957–58	Komet Blankenese
1958–59	FC St. Pauli Amateure
1959–60	VfL Pinneberg
1960–61	Rasensport Elmshorn
1961–62	Germania Schnelsen
1962–63	SpVgg Blankenese
1963–64	HEBC Hamburg
1964–65	Holsatia Elmshorn
1965–66	SpVgg Blankenese
1966–67	Germania Schnelsen
1967–68	TuS Hamburg
1968–69	SC Victoria Hamburg
1969–70	Union 03 Altona

Source:"Landesliga Hamburg-Germania". Das deutsche Fussball-Archiv.

== Sources ==
- Das deutsche Fussball Archiv
