= Omar Nazar =

Afghan footballer (born 1978)

Personal information
- Full name: Omar Nazar
- Date of birth: November 1, 1978 (age 48)
- Place of birth: Kabul, Afghanistan
- Position: Midfielder

Senior career*
| Years | Team | Apps | (Gls) |
| 2001–2002 | HSV Barmbek-Uhlenhorst | | |
| 2002–2004 | VfL Lohbrügge | 21 | (1) |
| 2004–2005 | SC Concordia Hamburg | 10 | (3) |
| 2005 | HSV Barmbek-Uhlenhorst | 9 | (0) |
| 2006–2008 | VfL Lohbrügge | | |

International career
| 2002–2004 | Afghanistan | 4 | (0) |
- * Club domestic league appearances and goals

Omar Nazar (Persian: عمر نظر) is an Afghan footballer who last played for VfL Lohbrügge.

== National team statistics ==
Afghanistan national team
| Year | Apps | Goals |
|---|---|---|
| 2003 | 4 | 0 |
| Total | 4 | 0 |
