= Barsbütteler SV =

German football club

- Full name: Barsbütteler Sportverein von 1948 e.V.
- Founded: 1948
- Ground: Sportzentrum Soltausredder
- Capacity: 2,500
- League: Landesliga Hamburg-Hansa (VI)
- 2015–16: 13th
- Website: https://www.barsbuetteler-sv.de
Home colours	Away colours

Barsbütteler SV is a German association football club from the city of Barsbüttel, Schleswig-Holstein

== History ==
The club was established on 27 October 1948. Part of the membership left to form Willinghuesener Sport-Club in 1958. In addition to fielding a football side the club has departments for aerobics, athletics, badminton, basketball, fitness, gymnastics, Judo, Karate, running, swimming, Taekwon-Do, table tennis, and volleyball.

In 1994, SV won promotion to the Oberliga Hamburg/Schleswig-Holstein (IV) where they competed until the 1996–97 season after which they were sent down following a 13th-place result.

== Honours ==
The club's honours:

- Landesliga Hamburg-Hansa: 1986, 1992, 2003
