= Leng Makara =

Cambodian footballer

Leng Makara ឡេង មករា
Personal information
- Full name: Leng Makara
- Date of birth: January 7, 1990 (age 36)
- Place of birth: Koh Kong, Cambodia
- Height: 1.71 m (5 ft 7 in)
- Position: Right back

Team information
- Current team: Phnom Penh City
- Number: 18

Senior career*
Years	Team	Apps	(Gls)
2012–2016	Phnom Penh Crown		
2017–2025	Nagaworld		
2026–	Phnom Penh City		

International career^{‡}
2016	Cambodia	1	(0)
- * Club domestic league appearances and goals as of 14:35, 13 October 2026 (UTC) ‡ National team caps and goals as of 14:35, 25 March 2016 (UTC)

Leng Makara (born 7 January 1990) is a Cambodian footballer who plays for Cambodian League 2 club, Phnom Penh City.

== International career ==
Makara made his international debut in the 2018 FIFA World Cup qualification – AFC second round against Syria on 24 March 2016.

== Honours ==
Phnom Penh Crown

Winner

- Cambodian League: 2014, 2015
