= SV St. Georg =

- Full name: Sport Verein St. Georg von 1885 e.V.
- Founded: 1895
- League: Kreisliga Hamburg 5 (VIII)
- 2015–16: 13th
Home colours	Away colours

SV St. Georg Hamburg is a German association football club playing in Hamburg. The club was established 3 June 1895 and shares a common origin with FC Hammonia Hamburg: both sides arose out of the students group Seminarvereinigung Frisch-Auf with St. Georg being formed first on the left bank of the Alster River, and Hammonia appearing later on the right bank. Like their brother side, St. Georg was a founding member of the German Football Association (Deutscher Fussball Bund or German Football Association) at Leipzig in 1900. However, while Hammonia folded after only a short existence, St. Georg still plays today.

== History ==
=== Foundation to WWI ===
St. Georg played first class ball in the Hamburg league throughout the early part of the century until relegated at the end of the 1912–13 season. The club quickly recovered and emerged as city champions of the Hamburger-Altonaer Fussball Bund (Hamburg-Altona Football Association) in 1916 before going on to win the Norddeutscher Fussball Verband (North German Football League) regional championship. Two years later they would repeat as HAFB and NDFV champions as part of the combined wartime side KVgg St.Georger/SC Sperber.

Normally, the capture of the North German regional titles would have led St. Georg to participation in the national final rounds. However, the country was embroiled in World War I and national championship play was suspended from 1915 to 1919 with league play in general being significantly reduced.

After the war, SC Sperber resumed play as an independent side and in 1819 St. George entered into a new union with Hamburger TS 1816 to form the club SpVgg. (SV) St. Georg. Initially a strong side in the city league, the team soon slipped and was not able to advance again to regional level play. The union of the two clubs was dissolved in 1922.

=== 30s and WWII ===
St. Georg continued to play top-tier football until 1928 when the club slipped to the second division Bezirksliga for the first time. They returned to first division play after a two-season absence. In 1933 German football was re-organized under the Third Reich into sixteen top-flight divisions. However, a poor eighth-place finish the previous year saw St. Georg left behind in the Bezirksliga Hamburg (II) until 1939 when they again joined Sperber in a wartime union (Kriegspielgemeinschaft) to play as KSG Sperber/St.Georg in the Gauliga Nordmark. As a separate side Sperber had already played two seasons (1935–36 and 1936–37) in the top-flight. The newly combined side was relegated after just two seasons.

The Gauliga Nordmark was split into two new divisions, the Gauliga Schleswig-Holstein and the Gauliga Hamburg in 1942, and Sperber/St.Georg returned to play in the latter division. After the 1943–44 season this club was merged with Post SG Hamburg and HSV Barmbeck-Uhlenhorst and played as KSG Alsterdorf until the end of World War II.

=== Postwar ===
After the end of war all organizations in Germany, including sports and football associations, were ordered dissolved by occupying Allied authorities. SV St. Georg was re-constituted in the fall of 1945 and played in the third-class city league. A 1946 merger with TS Blau-Weiß 1923 Hamburg helped advance the club to second division competition until league re-organization the next season again marked St Georg as a third-tier side in the Bezirksklasse Hamburg (III).

In 1966 the club captured the division championship in what had by then become the Verbandsliga Hamburg-Hammonia and was promoted to the Landesliga Hamburg (III) where they immediately captured another title but were unsuccessful in a bid to move up to the Regionalliga. League re-organization in 1974 again saw the club dropped down one play class as the Landesliga Hamburg became a fourth division circuit. A highlight of the 1970s was St. Georg's participation in the 1976 German Cup competition which saw the team put out in the first round 0:4 by Bundesliga side Arminia Bielefeld.

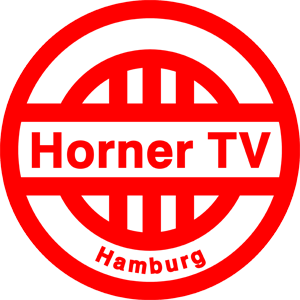
Logo of Horner Turnverein 1905 Hamburg

=== 80s to the present ===
However, the club faltered and by the end of the decade had begun a descent that landed it in the Kreisliga Hamburg – Staffel Ost (VIII) in 1985. In 2000 St. Georg merged with the football side of Horner TV 1905 to create present-day club FC St.Georg-Horn im Horner TV. The team captured the Landesliga Hamburg-Hansa (VI) title in 2005 to be promoted to the Verbandsliga Hamburg (V), but were immediately relegated. The cooperation between the two clubs ended in 2007, after a last place finish in the Landesliga, and the Horner TV played in the Bezirksliga Ost in 2007–08, coming last and being relegated. St. Georg in turn reverted to their old name SV St. Georg and now play in the Kreisliga, the second-lowest division in Hamburg.
