= TSG Bergedorf 1860 =

German football club

- Full name: Turn- und Sportgemeinschaft Bergedorf von 1860 e.V.
- Nickname: TSG
- Founded: 1860
- League: Kreisliga Hamburg 3 (VIII)
- 2015–16: 9th
Home colours	Away colours

TSG Bergedorf is a German association football club from the borough of Bergedorf in the city of Hamburg. The origins of the club are in the formation of the gymnastics club Bergerdorfer Mannerturnverein in 1860. In the 1880s two other clubs emerged from this parent association; Bergedorfer Turnerschaft 1880 and Allgemeiner Turnerverein Bergedorf von 1885.

== History ==
MTV remained active and in 1915–16 during World War I was part of the wartime sports club Kriegsverein Bergedorf alongside partner Bergedorfer TS 1880. After the war TS was joined by Fußball Club Eintracht 1910 Bergedorf in 1919 and two years later re-joined MTV to form Bergedorfer Turnerschaft 1860. The short-lived club Sportverein Stern Bergedorf was formed out of BTS 1860 in 1925, but was lost in 1929.

On 20 February 1965, BTS 1860 was joined by Spiel- und Sport Bergedorf 1902 to form the present-day side Turn- und Sportgemeinschaft Bergedorf von 1860. The merger with SuS brought together again a number of successor sides that had emerged from BTS 1880. Bergedorfer Fußball Club was formed out of 1880 in 1902 and Bergedorfer Sportverein followed in 1904. These two clubs merged in 1918 to form SuS. During World War II SuS played alongside Bergedorfer Sportverein 1933 (today SV Nettelnburg-Allermöhe) as Kriegspielgemeinschaft SuS Bergedorf-33 from 1939 to 1944. In 1944 and 45 SuS was briefly partnered with VfL Lohbrügge 1892 as KSG SuS Bergedorf/Lohbrügge.

Following the war SuS was a longtime third division club playing without any real distinction in the Bezirksklasse Hamburg and Verbandsliga Hamburg from the late 1940s, through the 1950s and on into the early 1960s. The formation of the new first division Bundesliga in 1963 and the related reorganization of German football saw SuS become a fourth tier side.

The merger that created TSG helped propel the club to the Amateurliga Hamburg (III) by way of a Verbandsliga Hamburg (IV) title in 1965. They played 6 season there from 1965 to 1969 and 1971 to 1973.

Nowadays the club plays in the tier eight Kreisliga after a Kreisklasse championship in 2015.

== Honours ==
- Verbandsliga Hamburg-Hammonia (IV)
  - Champions: 1965
