= Ramon Saro =

Brazilian footballer

Personal information
- Full name: Ramon de Lima Saro
- Date of birth: 26 July 1991 (age 35)
- Place of birth: Taboão da Serra, Brazil
- Height: 1.90 m (6 ft 3 in)
- Position: Centre-back

Senior career*
Years	Team	Apps	(Gls)
2008–2010	Paraná Clube	10	(0)
2012–2014	Dili United		
2015	Porto Taibesse		
2015–2016	Bahrain SC		

International career^{‡}
2012–2016	Timor-Leste	13	(2)
- * Club domestic league appearances and goals ‡ National team caps and goals as of 29 January 2017

Ramon de Lima Saro (born 26 July 1991) is a Brazilian footballer who plays as a centre-back.

== Career ==
=== Club ===
On 9 February 2019, Saro joined Dordoi Bishkek on trial.

=== International ===
On 19 January 2017, the Asian Football Confederation declared Saro and eleven other Brazilian men's footballers ineligible to represent East Timor. Two months later, the East Timorese passport he had received have been declared ‘null and void’ by the Ministry of Justice of East Timor.

== Career statistics ==
=== International ===
Appearances and goals by national team and year
National team	Year	Apps	Goals
Timor-Leste	2012	5	0
Timor-Leste	2013	–	
Timor-Leste	2014	–	
Timor-Leste	2015	8	2
Timor-Leste	2016	1	0
Total		14	2

Scores and results list Timor-Leste's goal tally first, score column indicates score after each Saro goal.

List of international goals scored by Ramon Saro
No.	Date	Venue	Opponent	Score	Result	Competition
1	11 June 2015	Bukit Jalil National Stadium, Kuala Lumpur, Malaysia	Malaysia	1–1	1–1	2018 FIFA World Cup qualification
2	8 October 2015	National Stadium, Dili, East Timor	Palestine	1–0	1–1	2018 FIFA World Cup qualification
