= Josef Shirdel =

German-Afghan footballer

Personal information
- Full name: Mohamed Josef Shirdel
- Date of birth: 3 April 1993 (age 33)
- Place of birth: Hamburg, Germany
- Height: 1.86 m (6 ft 1 in)
- Positions: Winger; midfielder

Team information
- Current team: Dersimspor

Youth career
- 1.FC Hellbrook
- HT 1816 Hamburg
- –2011: FC St. Pauli
- 2011–2012: Hamburger SV

Senior career*
Years	Team	Apps	(Gls)
2012–2015	Hamburger SV II	45	(8)
2015–2016	ETSV Weiche	25	(6)
2017–	Dersimspor	0	(0)

International career^{‡}
2016–	Afghanistan	3	(1)
- * Club domestic league appearances and goals ‡ National team caps and goals as of 29 March 2016

Mohamed Josef Shirdel (born 3 April 1993) is a German Afghan professional footballer who plays for Dersimspor in the Landesliga Hamburg-Hansa and plays for the Afghanistan national football team.

== International career ==
Shirdel was called up for Afghanistan for the 2015 SAFF Championship games but did not compete because of illness. He was again called up for the World Cup 2018 Qualifying games against Japan and Singapore. He appeared for Afghanistan in the World Cup qualifying game on 24 March 2016, which was won by Japan 5–0. Shirdel scored his first goal in his second match for Afghanistan against Singapore.

== International goals ==
Goal	Date	Venue	Opponent	Score	Result	Competition
1	29 March 2016	Takhti Stadium, Tehran, Iran	Singapore	2–0	2–1	2018 FIFA World Cup qualification and 2019 AFC Asian Cup qualification
