= Fayez Chamsine =

Lebanese footballer (born 1992)

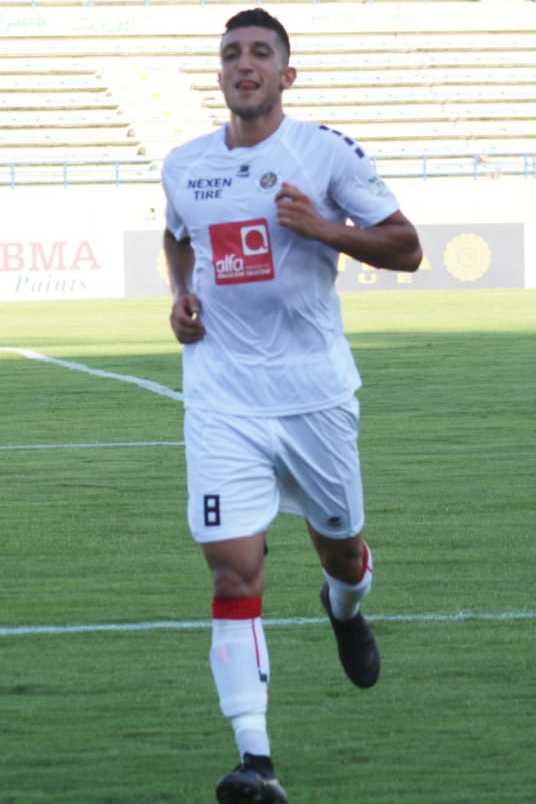
- Chamsine with Nejmeh in 2019

Personal information
- Full name: Fayez Bilal Chamsine
- Date of birth: 12 July 1992 (age 34)
- Place of birth: Tripoli, Lebanon
- Height: 1.84 m (6 ft 0 in)
- Position: Forward

Youth career
- 2009–2010: Hamburger SV
- 2010–2011: FC St. Pauli
- 2011–2012: Hannover 96

Senior career*
Years	Team	Apps	(Gls)
2010–2011	FC St. Pauli II	3	(0)
2011–2012	Hannover 96 II	6	(0)
2012–2013	Egtmaaey	20	(11)
2013–2015	Pandurii Târgu Jiu	19	(4)
2015–2016	Egtmaaey	15	(8)
2016–2018	Tripoli	21	(7)
2018	Saham		
2018–2019	Chennai City		
2019–2020	Nejmeh	0	(0)
2020	Termalica Nieciecza	7	(0)
2021–2022	Ansar	15	(4)
Total		108	(36)

International career
2012–2017	Lebanon	18	(3)
- * Club domestic league appearances and goals

Fayez Bilal Chamsine (Arabic: فَايِز بِلَال شَمْسِين; born 12 July 1992) is a Lebanese former professional footballer who played as a forward.

== Club career ==
Chamsine joined Pandurii Târgu Jiu in 2013, and scored a hat-trick on his first team debut, in a Romanian Cup match against Farul Constanța on 25 September 2013. He debuted in Liga I for Pandurii in a 2–1 loss against Gaz Metan Mediaș. He later signed for I-League side Chennai City in 2018, but did not appear in any league match.

After having his contract rescinded by Nejmeh on 19 February 2020, Chamsine joined Polish I liga side Bruk-Bet Termalica Nieciecza on 5 March 2020, on a six-month contract with an option for a further year. He returned to Lebanon on 23 July 2021, joining Ansar.

== Career statistics ==
=== International ===
Scores and results list Lebanon's goal tally first, score column indicates score after each Chamsine goal.

List of international goals scored by Fayez Chamsine
No.	Date	Venue	Opponent	Score	Result	Competition
1	16 October 2012	Saida Municipal Stadium, Sidon, Lebanon	Yemen	2–1	2–1	Friendly
2	16 June 2015	New Laos National Stadium, Vientiane, Lebanon	Laos	2–0	2–0	2018 FIFA World Cup qualification
3	10 November 2016	Camille Chamoun Sports City Stadium, Beirut, Lebanon	Palestine	1–0	1–1	Friendly

== Honours ==
FC St. Pauli II

- Oberliga Hamburg: 2011

Pandurii Târgu Jiu

- Cupa Ligii runners-up: 2014–15

Ansar

- Lebanese Super Cup: 2021
- Lebanese FA Cup runner-up: 2021–22
