= Landesliga Hamburg-Hansa =

- Founded: 1947 / 1953
- Country: Germany
- State: Hamburg
- Number of clubs: 16
- Level on pyramid: Level 6
- Promotion to: Oberliga Hamburg
- Relegation to: Bezirksliga Hamburg-Ost; Bezirksliga Hamburg-Süd
- Current champions: 3 division winners (2021–22)

The Landesliga Hamburg-Hansa is the sixth tier of the German football league system and the second-highest league in the German state of Hamburg, together with the Landesliga Hamburg-Hammonia. It is named after the Hanseatic League (Hanse), which Hamburg was a member of.

== Overview ==
=== 1947 to 1950 ===
The league was formed in 1947, alongside three other divisions on the same level in the city of Hamburg, as the Bezirksklasse Hamburg-Hansa. The other three leagues were:

- Bezirksklasse Hamburg-Hammonia
- Bezirksklasse Hamburg-Germania
- Bezirksklasse Hamburg-Olympia

The four new leagues replaced the 1. Klasse Hamburg as the feeder leagues to the Stadtliga Hamburg, which was now renamed Verbandsliga Hamburg. The 1. Klasse Hamburg had been operating since the end of the Second World War in 1945 and consisted of three divisions. The change in the league system at this level came together with the establishment of the Oberliga Nord as the new tier-one league in Northern Germany. This meant the new Bezirksklasse in Hamburg was now the third tier of the league system, below Oberliga and Verbandsliga.

The league started out with ten clubs, with the league champion being promoted to the Verbandsliga. In its second season, the league expanded to twelve clubs. The league above it was renamed from Verbandsliga Hamburg to Amateurliga Hamburg at the end of this season. The year after, in 1950, the Amateurliga was then reduced to one single division from the two it had been operating at previously.

For the Bezirksklasse, this also meant a change: The four existing divisions were disbanded and replaced by two leagues:

- Bezirksklasse Hamburg-Alster
- Bezirksklasse Hamburg-Elbe

For the Hansa-division (German: Hansa-Staffel) this meant a temporary end to its operation.

=== 1953 to 1963 ===
In 1953, the league was once more reestablished and the Elbe-Staffel and Alster-Staffel disbanded. Three of the four leagues in existence until 1950 were reformed, the Olympia-Staffel however, was not. The leagues were now named Verbandsligas:

- Verbandsliga Hamburg-Hansa
- Verbandsliga Hamburg-Hammonia
- Verbandsliga Hamburg-Germania

Each of the three divisions had now fourteen clubs and the league champion was again promoted directly to the Amateurliga Hamburg. The leagues were again the third tier of the German league system. In the fourteen-team per division era, usually the bottom two teams of each division were relegated. Additionally, teams would be moved between the three divisions according to geographical necessity, to balance them out.

In 1963, the Bundesliga was established in Germany. The old Oberliga Nord was disbanded and at its stead, the Regionalliga Nord was set as the second tier of the league system. The Amateurliga Hamburg, now renamed Landesliga Hamburg, slipped to third tier in the league system, making the three Verbandsligas the fourth tier now. Otherwise, nothing changed for the three leagues.

=== 1963 to 1974 ===
In the first couple of seasons after 1963, nothing changed for the three leagues. The Hansa-Staffel was upsized to fifteen teams for the 1968–69 season, but returned to fourteen the year after.

In 1970, the Germania-Staffel was disbanded, leaving only the Hansa and Hammonia division on this level, as it is today. The two remaining divisions were increased in size, Hansa to seventeen and Hammonia to sixteen. Also, the leagues changed their name from Verbandsliga to Amateurliga. The following season, both divisions operated with sixteen clubs.

In 1974, the Regionalliga Nord was replaced by the 2nd Bundesliga Nord as the second tier in the region. As the new third tier, the Oberliga Nord was re-established. The Landesliga Hamburg, now renamed Verbandsliga Hamburg slipped to fourth tier because of this change and the two Amateurligas below it therefore to fifth tier.

=== 1974 to 1994 ===
In 1978, the Amateurligas in Hamburg were renamed to Landesliga, a name they carry to date. Nothing changed otherwise for the Landesliga Hamburg-Hansa.

The league experienced no change in the two decades from 1974 to 1994, operating on sixteen teams for all but one season. Also, changes in the league system above it did not affect it in this time.

In 1994, however, the Regionalligas were reformed. In the north, this meant a reestablishing of the Regionalliga Nord. The Oberliga Nord was disbanded again and in its stead, the Oberliga Hamburg/Schleswig-Holstein was formed. The Regionalliga becoming the new third tier in the league system meant for the Landesligas that they now fell to sixth tier.

=== 1994 to current ===
The league continued to remain unchanged. The Oberliga Nord was re-formed, again, in 2004, replacing the Oberliga Hamburg/Schleswig-Holstein at this level. This meant no change for the Landesligas.

In 2008, the 3. Liga was established and the Oberliga Nord once more disbanded. Instead of this league, the five northern Verbandsligas were elevated to the status of Oberliga, meaning, the Verbandsliga Hamburg now became the Oberliga Hamburg. The two leagues below it remained as the Landesligas, unchanged in name and tier.

== Position of the Hansa-Staffel in the league system ==
Years	League name	Tier	Promotion to
1947–48	Bezirksklasse Hamburg-Hansa	III	Verbandsliga Hamburg
1948–50	Bezirksklasse Hamburg-Hansa	III	Amateurliga Hamburg
1953–63	Verbandsliga Hamburg-Hansa	III	Amateurliga Hamburg
1963–70	Verbandsliga Hamburg-Hansa	IV	Landesliga Hamburg
1970–74	Amateurliga Hamburg-Hansa	IV	Landesliga Hamburg
1974–78	Amateurliga Hamburg-Hansa	V	Verbandsliga Hamburg
1978–94	Landesliga Hamburg-Hansa	V	Verbandsliga Hamburg
1994–2008	Landesliga Hamburg-Hansa	VI	Verbandsliga Hamburg
2008-current	Landesliga Hamburg-Hansa	VI	Oberliga Hamburg

== League champions ==
The league champions:

Season	Club
1947–48	Wandsbeker FC
1948–49	Hinschenfelder FC
1949–50	Polizei Hamburg
1950–1953	no competition
1953–54	Borussia Harburg
1954–55	Rasensport Harburg
1955–56	Viktoria Wilhelmsburg
1956–57	FV Wilhelmsburg 09
1957–58	Viktoria Harburg
1958–59	Rasensport Harburg
1959–60	TuS Güldenstern Stade
1960–61	Hamburger SV Am.
1961–62	TuS Güldenstern Stade
1962–63	VfL Stade
1963–64	TuS Hamburg
1964–65	Borussia Harburg
1965–66	Union 03 Altona
1966–67	Borussia Harburg
1967–68	TuS Finkenwerder
1968–69	TuS Güldenstern Stade
1969–70	FV Wilhelmsburg 09
1970–71	TSG Bergedorf 1860
1971–72	FC Altona 93
1972–73	Vorwärts Billstedt
1973–74	Buxtehuder SV

Season	Club
1974–75	VfL Stade
1975–76	SC Urania Hamburg
1976–77	1. SC Norderstedt
1977–78	Hummelsbütteler SV
1978–79	Hamburger SV Am.
1979–80	Bramfelder SV
1980–81	VfL Geesthacht
1981–82	SV Börnsen
1982–83	Meiendorfer SV
1983–84	TSV Duwo 08
1984–85	SC Eilbeck
1985–86	Barsbütteler SV
1986–87	Glashütter SV
1987–88	Ahrensburger TSV
1988–89	Ochsenwerder SpVgg
1989–90	VfL 93 Hamburg
1990–91	SC Condor Hamburg
1991–92	Barsbütteler SV
1992–93	VfL Lohbrügge
1993–94	Bramfelder SV
1994–95	SV Börnsen
1995–96	Ochsenwerder SpVgg
1996–97	TuS Dassendorf
1997–98	Eimsbütteler TV

Season	Club
1998–99	Barmbek-Uhlenhorst
1999–2000	Bramfelder SV
2000–01	Meiendorfer SV
2001–02	VfL Lohbrügge
2002–03	Barsbütteler SV
2003–04	NTSV Niendorf
2004–05	FC St. Georg Hamburg
2005–06	Eintracht Norderstedt
2006–07	GSK Bergedorf
2007–08	Vorwärts–Wacker Hamburg
2008–09	Oststeinbeker SV
2009–10	Bramfelder SV
2010–11	SC Vier– und Marschlande
2011–12	Barmbek-Uhlenhorst
2012–13	Oststeinbeker SV
2013–14	Buxtehuder SV
2014–15	FC Türkiye Wilhelmsburg
2015–16	SC Poppenbüttel
2016–17	TSV Sasel
2017–18	Meiendorfer SV
2018–19	Bramfelder SV
2019–20	VfL Lohbrügge
2020–21	Season curtailed and annulled
2021–22	Season played in 3 divisions

Source: "Landesliga Hamburg–Hansa". Das deutsche Fussball–Archiv.
