= SC Union 03 Altona =

Association football club in Germany

Union 03 Altona
- Full name: Sport-Club Union von 1903 Altona e.V.
- Founded: 1903; 123 years ago
- Ground: Rudolf-Barth-Stadion
- League: Kreisliga 2 Hamburg (VIII)
- 2015–16: 13th
Home colours	Away colours

SC Union 03 Altona is a German association football club based in the Altona district of the city of Hamburg. The football team is a department of a larger sports club which also offers handball and tennis. During the inter-war period (1906–36) the club was a regular part of first division play and sent a number of players to north German representative teams. By the 1970s, Union was recognized for its handball players who twice won the national title.

== History ==
The team was established by a group of students and young apprentices on 7 June 1903 and became part of the Hamburg-Altona Football Association two years later. Club tradition has it that they qualified immediately for first division by way of a solid performance in a test match against a side made up of local English footballers. Gyula Kertész coached the side from 1921-24.

In early 1923, several members left Union to found SV West Eimsbuettel. Shortly after that, in 1925, what would become a very successful handball department was added to the club. Following the adoption of the Greater Hamburg Act (1937) that expanded the city boundaries to include the town of Altona, the club was rechristened SC Union 03 Hamburg.

Union was briefly again part of first division football in the aftermath of World War II from 1945 to 1947. They failed to qualify for the new Oberliga Nord (I) and were part of second division competition until 1963. During the club's heyday in the 1920s, it had some 2,000 members and qualified for the North German championship round nine times. By the turn of the millennium it included only 400 members and they entered into merger talks with Altona FC 1893, which ultimately failed.

After relegation to the tier nine Kreisklasse in 2012 the club won promotion back to the Kreisliga the season after where it plays today.
