= VfL Lohbrügge =

German football club

- Full name: VfL Lohbrügge von 1892 e.V.
- Founded: 1892
- Ground: Wilhelm-Lindemann-Sportplatz
- League: Oberliga Hamburg
- 2020–2021: 1st, Promoted
- Website: https://www.vfl-lohbruegge.de/sportarten/fussball/1-herrenfussball

VfL Lohbrügge is a German association football club based in Hamburg. As of the 2021–22 season, the club plays in the Oberliga Hamburg.
