= 2010–11 Hannover 96 season =

Hannover 96
2010–11 season
- Chairman: Martin Kind
- Manager: Mirko Slomka
- Bundesliga: 4th
- DFB-Pokal: First round
- Top goalscorer: League: Didier Ya Konan (14); All: Didier Ya Konan (14)
- Highest home attendance: 49,000 vs. Multiple Opponents
- Lowest home attendance: 34,108 vs. SC Freiburg, 27 November 2010
- Average home league attendance: 41,673
Home colours	Away colours	Third colours

The 2010–11 season of Hannover 96 began on 26 June with their first friendly match.

== Squad ==
Note: Flags indicate national team as defined under FIFA eligibility rules; some limited exceptions apply. Players may hold more than one non-FIFA nationality.

No.	Pos.	Nation	Player
1	GK	GER	Florian Fromlowitz
3	DF	DEN	Leon Andreasen
4	DF	AUT	Emanuel Pogatetz
5	DF	SUI	Mario Eggimann
6	DF	USA	Steve Cherundolo (captain)
7	MF	POR	Sérgio Pinto
8	MF	ALB	Altin Lala
11	FW	CIV	Didier Ya Konan
13	FW	GER	Jan Schlaudraff
14	GK	GER	Markus Miller
15	DF	CIV	Constant Djakpa
16	MF	USA	DaMarcus Beasley
17	MF	GER	Moritz Stoppelkamp
19	DF	GER	Christian Schulz

No.	Pos.	Nation	Player
20	GK	GER	Ron-Robert Zieler
21	DF	TUN	Karim Haggui
23	DF	TUN	Sofian Chahed
25	FW	NOR	Mohammed Abdellaoue
28	FW	GER	Lars Stindl
30	MF	POR	Carlitos
31	MF	GER	Tim Hofmann
32	FW	FIN	Mikael Forssell
33	MF	GER	Manuel Schmiedebach
34	MF	GER	Konstantin Rausch
35	MF	GER	Christopher Avevor
36	MF	GER	Willi Evseev
37	DF	GER	Felix Burmeister

=== Transfers ===
==== Summer ====
In:

No.	Pos.	Nation	Player
4	DF	AUT	Emanuel Pogatetz (from Middlesbrough F.C.)
14	GK	GER	Markus Miller (from Karlsruher SC)
16	MF	USA	DaMarcus Beasley (from Rangers F.C.)
17	FW	GER	Moritz Stoppelkamp (from Rot-Weiss Oberhausen)
20	GK	GER	Ron-Robert Zieler (from Manchester United F.C.)
25	FW	NOR	Mohammed Abdellaoue (from Vålerenga)
28	MF	GER	Lars Stindl (from Karlsruher SC)
30	MF	POR	Carlitos (from FC Basel)
35	DF	GER	Christopher Avevor (from Hannover 96 U-19)
36	MF	GER	Willi Evseev (from Hannover 96 U-19)

Out:

No.	Pos.	Nation	Player
2	DF	BRA	Vinícius (released)
4	DF	SVK	Ján Ďurica (loan return to Lokomotiv Moscow)
10	MF	NED	Arnold Bruggink (released)
14	MF	GER	Hanno Balitsch (to Bayer 04 Leverkusen)
16	GK	GER	Uwe Gospodarek (retired)
18	FW	CIV	Arouna Koné (loan return to Sevilla FC)
20	MF	POL	Jacek Krzynówek (retired)
24	FW	CZE	Jiří Štajner (to Slovan Liberec)
25	MF	BRA	Élson (loan return to VfB Stuttgart)
26	MF	GER	Jan Rosenthal (to SC Freiburg)
28	DF	GER	Leon Balogun (to SV Werder Bremen II)
30	GK	GER	Morten Jensen (released)
36	DF	GER	Hendrik Hahne (to SV Babelsberg 03)
37	MF	USA	Sal Zizzo (to Chivas USA)

==== Winter ====
In:

No.	Pos.	Nation	Player

Out:

No.	Pos.	Nation	Player
9	FW	GER	Mike Hanke (to Borussia Mönchengladbach)
22	MF	ALB	Valdet Rama (to Örebro SK)

== Season results ==
=== Bundesliga ===
==== League table ====
Pos	Team	Pld	W	D	L	GF	GA	GD	Pts	Qualification or relegation
2	Bayer Leverkusen	34	20	8	6	64	44	+20	68	Qualification to Champions League group stage
3	Bayern Munich	34	19	8	7	81	40	+41	65	Qualification to Champions League play-off round
4	Hannover 96	34	19	3	12	49	45	+4	60	Qualification to Europa League play-off round
5	FSV Mainz 05	34	18	4	12	52	39	+13	58	Qualification to Europa League third qualifying round
6	1. FC Nürnberg	34	13	8	13	47	45	+2	47	

Source: kicker
Rules for classification: 1) points; 2) goal difference; 3) number of goals scored.

==== Matches ====
21 August 2010 1	Hannover 96	2–1	Eintracht Frankfurt	Hanover
15:30 CEST (UTC+02:00)	Rausch 21'; Ya Konan 75'	Report	Köhler 27'; Tzavellas (yellow card) 63'	Stadium: AWD-Arena; Attendance: 37,212; Referee: Deniz Aytekin

28 August 2010 2	Schalke 04	1–2	Hannover 96	Gelsenkirchen
15:30 CEST (UTC+02:00)	Sarpei (yellow card) 72'; Jones 83', (yellow card) 89'	Report	Rausch 31'; Pogatetz (yellow card) 34'; Abdellaoue 49'; Haggui 62'	Stadium: Veltins-Arena; Attendance: 61,226; Referee: Markus Schmidt

11 September 2010 3	Hannover 96	2–2	Bayer Leverkusen	Hanover
15:30 CEST (UTC+02:00)	Pogatetz (yellow card) 7' (yellow-red card) 36'; Ya Konan 20'; Cherundolo (yellow card) 45+2'; Abdellaoue 50'; Fromlowitz (yellow card) 78'	Report	Ballack (yellow card) 4'; Kadlec (yellow card) 33'; Bender (yellow card) 53'; Derdiyok 62'; Reinartz (yellow card) 85'; Helmes 90'	Stadium: AWD-Arena; Attendance: 40,852; Referee: Guido Winkmann

18 September 2010 4	VfL Wolfsburg	2–0	Hannover 96	Wolfsburg
15:30 CEST (UTC+02:00)	Diego (yellow card) 4', (goal) 55'; Josué (yellow card) 63'; Džeko 67'	Report	Schmiedebach (yellow card) 56'; Schulz (yellow card) 59'	Stadium: Volkswagen Arena; Attendance: 30,000; Referee: Wolfgang Stark

21 September 2010 5	Hannover 96	4–1	Werder Bremen	Hanover
20:00 CEST (UTC+02:00)	Fritz 11' (o.g.); Schmiedebach (yellow card) 15'; Ya Konan 53'; Pinto (yellow card) 78'; Schulz 79'; Abdellaoue 90+2'	Report	Frings 36' (pen.); Silvestre (yellow card) 59'; Bargfrede (yellow card) 70'; Marin (yellow card) 90'	Stadium: AWD-Arena; Attendance: 43,127; Referee: Felix Brych

26 September 2010 6	1. FC Kaiserslautern	0–1	Hannover 96	Kaiserslautern
17:30 CEST (UTC+02:00)		Report	Abdellaoue 33'; Schulz (yellow card) 79'; Fromlowitz (yellow card) 86'; Pogatetz (yellow card) 88'	Stadium: Fritz-Walter-Stadion; Attendance: 40,115; Referee: Günter Perl

1 October 2010 7	Hannover 96	0–1	FC St. Pauli	Hanover
20:30 CEST (UTC+02:00)	Schmiedebach (yellow card) 39'; Pinto (yellow card) 69'; Haggui (red card) 80'	Report	Ebbers 6'; Kruse (yellow card) 44'; Boll (yellow card) 54'	Stadium: AWD-Arena; Attendance: 49,000; Referee: Markus Wingenbach

16 October 2010 8	Bayern Munich	3–0	Hannover 96	Munich
15:30 CEST (UTC+02:00)	Gómez 21', 77', 90', (yellow card) 78'; Badstuber (yellow card) 89'; Tymoshchuk (yellow card) 90+1'	Report	Ya Konan (yellow card) 89'	Stadium: Allianz Arena; Attendance: 69,000; Referee: Marco Fritz

23 October 2010 9	Hannover 96	2–1	1. FC Köln	Hanover
15:30 CEST (UTC+02:00)	Ya Konan 4', 15'; Pinto (yellow card) 10'	Report	Brečko (yellow card) 53'; Lanig 86'	Stadium: AWD-Arena; Attendance: 44,214; Referee: Peter Sippel

31 October 2010 10	1899 Hoffenheim	4–0	Hannover 96	Sinsheim
17:30 CET (UTC+01:00)	Sigurðsson 45', 48' (pen.); Ba 51'; Gustavo (yellow card) 63'; Mlapa 71'	Report	Schmiedebach (yellow card) 11' (yellow-red card) 18'; Pinto (yellow card) 20'	Stadium: Rhein-Neckar-Arena; Attendance: 28,450; Referee: Manuel Gräfe

7 November 2010 11	Hannover 96	0–4	Borussia Dortmund	Hanover
15:30 CET (UTC+01:00)	Haggui (red card) 77'	Report	Kagawa 11'; Piszczek (yellow card) 33'; Barrios 72', (yellow card) 73'; Lewandowski 81'; Błaszczykowski 90+1'	Stadium: AWD-Arena; Attendance: 49,000; Referee: Felix Brych

13 November 2010 12	Mainz 05	0–1	Hannover 96	Mainz
18:30 CET (UTC+01:00)		Report	Pinto 44'; Cherundolo (yellow card) 57' (yellow-red card) 68'; Chahed (yellow card) 89'	Stadium: Bruchwegstadion; Attendance: 20,000; Referee: Knut Kircher

20 November 2010 13	Hannover 96	3–2	Hamburger SV	Hanover
15:30 CET (UTC+01:00)	Stindl 31'; Schlaudraff (yellow card) 56'; Schulz 59'; Pinto (yellow card) 86'; Hanke 90+1'	Report	Son 40', 54'; Guerrero (yellow card) 56'; Roberto (yellow card) 69'; Trochowski (yellow card) 76'; Choupo-Moting (yellow card) 90+3'	Stadium: AWD-Arena; Attendance: 49,000; Referee: Jochen Drees

27 November 2010 14	Hannover 96	3–0	SC Freiburg	Hanover
15:30 CET (UTC+01:00)	Schlaudraff 15'; Ya Konan 73'; Hanke 89'	Report	Schuster (yellow card) 37'	Stadium: AWD-Arena; Attendance: 34,108; Referee: Peter Sippel

4 December 2010 15	Borussia Mönchengladbach	1–2	Hannover 96	Mönchengladbach
15:30 CET (UTC+01:00)	Bradley 19'; Bobadilla (red card) 43'; Reus (yellow card) 45'; Daems (yellow card) 56'	Report	Stindl (yellow card) 17'; Hanke 73'; Ya Konan 75'	Stadium: Stadion im Borussia-Park; Attendance: 37,195; Referee: Marco Fritz

10 December 2010 16	Hannover 96	2–1	VfB Stuttgart	Hanover
20:30 CET (UTC+01:00)	Ya Konan 35', 76', (yellow card) 59'; Pinto (yellow card) 74'	Report	Delpierre (yellow card) 51'; Degen (yellow card) 72'; Niedermeier 74'; Harnik (yellow card) 89'	Stadium: AWD-Arena; Attendance: 36,207; Referee: Manuel Gräfe

18 December 2010 17	1. FC Nürnberg	3–1	Hannover 96	Nuremberg
15:30 CET (UTC+01:00)	Cherundolo 28' (o.g.); Wolf 31'; Schäfer (yellow card) 76'; Schieber 82'	Report	Schmiedebach (yellow card) 43'; Pinto (yellow card) 47', (goal) 76' (pen.); Cherundolo (yellow card) 79'; Pogatetz (yellow card) 79'	Stadium: Easy-Credit-Stadion; Attendance: 33,111; Referee: Guido Winkmann

16 January 2011 18	Eintracht Frankfurt	0–3	Hannover 96	Frankfurt
15:30 CET (UTC+01:00)	Schwegler (yellow card) 66'	Report	Abdellaoue 15'; Schulz 21'; Rausch (yellow card) 79'; Ya Konan 89'	Stadium: Commerzbank-Arena; Attendance: 39,300; Referee: Thorsten Kinhöfer

22 January 2011 19	Hannover 96	0–1	Schalke 04	Hanover
15:30 CET (UTC+01:00)	Stindl (yellow card) 90+3'	Report	Raúl 33'; Schmitz (yellow card) 45'; Neuer (yellow card) 87'	Stadium: AWD-Arena; Attendance: 49,000; Referee: Jochen Drees

28 January 2011 20	Bayer Leverkusen	2–0	Hannover 96	Leverkusen
20:30 CET (UTC+01:00)	Vidal 21'; Rolfes 42'	Report		Stadium: BayArena; Attendance: 28,013; Referee: Manuel Gräfe

5 February 2011 21	Hannover 96	1–0	VfL Wolfsburg	Hanover
15:30 CET (UTC+01:00)	Pinto 5'; Ya Konan (yellow card) 37'	Report	Kjær (yellow card) 60'; Grafite (yellow card) 71'; Pekarík (yellow card) 84'	Stadium: AWD-Arena; Attendance: 37,213; Referee: Guido Winkmann

13 February 2011 22	Werder Bremen	1–1	Hannover 96	Bremen
17:30 CET (UTC+01:00)	Mertesacker 50'	Report	Ya Konan 26', (yellow card) 43'; Pogatetz (yellow card) 69'; Schmiedebach (yellow card) 90+3'	Stadium: Weser-Stadion; Attendance: 39,500; Referee: Felix Brych

19 February 2011 23	Hannover 96	3–0	1. FC Kaiserslautern	Hanover
15:30 CET (UTC+01:00)	Schlaudraff 17', 57'; Pinto (yellow card) 33'; Abdellaoue 45'	Report	Dick (yellow card) 65'	Stadium: AWD-Arena; Attendance: 35,412; Referee: Felix Zwayer

26 February 2011 24	FC St. Pauli	0–1	Hannover 96	Hamburg
15:30 CET (UTC+01:00)		Report	Schmiedebach (yellow card) 82'; Schulz 89'; Zieler (yellow card) 90+1'	Stadium: Millerntor-Stadion; Attendance: 24,487; Referee: Peter Gagelmann

5 March 2011 25	Hannover 96	3–1	Bayern Munich	Hanover
15:30 CET (UTC+01:00)	Abdellaoue 16', (yellow card) 60'; Rausch 51'; Pinto 62', (yellow card) 80'	Report	Kroos (yellow card) 42'; Robben 55'; Breno (red card) 73'	Stadium: AWD-Arena; Attendance: 49,000; Referee: Jochen Drees

11 March 2011 26	1. FC Köln	4–0	Hannover 96	Cologne
20:30 CET (UTC+01:00)	Petit 36'; Podolski 60'; Novaković 79', 89'	Report	Haggui (yellow card) 34'; Schulz (yellow card) 52'; Cherundolo (yellow card) 78'	Stadium: RheinEnergieStadion; Attendance: 46,500; Referee: Wolfgang Stark

19 March 2011 27	Hannover 96	2–0	1899 Hoffenheim	Hanover
15:30 CET (UTC+01:00)	Ya Konan 38'; Abdellaoue 53'	Report	Rudy (yellow card) 42'	Stadium: AWD-Arena; Attendance: 47,200; Referee: Marc Seemann

2 April 2011 28	Borussia Dortmund	4–1	Hannover 96	Hanover
15:30 CEST (UTC+02:00)	Götze 59'; Barrios 64', 73'; Großkreutz 83'	Report	Schmiedebach (yellow card) 52'; Abdellaoue 57'; Chahed (yellow card) 66'	Stadium: Signal Iduna Park; Attendance: 80,720; Referee: Manuel Gräfe

9 April 2011 29	Hannover 96	2–0	Mainz 05	Hanover
15:30 CEST (UTC+02:00)	Cherundolo (yellow card) 40'; Ya Konan 45+1'; Pinto 59'	Report	Polanski (yellow card) 33'; Noveski (red card) 45'; Svensson (yellow card) 45'; Bungert (yellow card) 46'	Stadium: AWD-Arena; Attendance: 48,000; Referee: Thorsten Kinhöfer

16 April 2011 30	Hamburger SV	0–0	Hannover 96	Hamburg
15:30 CEST (UTC+02:00)	Jarolim (yellow card) 79'	Report	Stindl (yellow card) 69'; Ya Konan (yellow card) 78'; Pinto (yellow card) 79'	Stadium: Imtech-Arena; Attendance: 57,000; Referee: Christian Dingert

21 April 2011 31	SC Freiburg	1–3	Hannover 96	Freiburg
20:30 CEST (UTC+02:00)	Rosenthal 79'	Report	Schulz (yellow card) 11'; Abdellaoue 24'; Schlaudraff 31'; Rausch 58'; Stindl (yellow card) 83'	Stadium: Badenova-Stadion; Attendance: 24,000; Referee: Markus Wingenbach

30 April 2011 32	Hannover 96	0–1	Borussia Mönchengladbach	Hanover
15:30 CEST (UTC+02:00)	Pinto (yellow card) 35'; Haggui (yellow card) 61'	Report	Reus 76'	Stadium: AWD-Arena; Attendance: 48,800; Referee: Marco Fritz

7 May 2011 33	VfB Stuttgart	2–1	Hannover 96	Stuttgart
15:30 CEST (UTC+02:00)	Boulahrouz (yellow card) 25'; Harnik (yellow card) 50'; Hajnal 58'; Okazaki 61'	Report	Stindl (yellow card) 11', (goal) 66'	Stadium: Mercedes-Benz Arena; Attendance: 39,000; Referee: Felix Zwayer

14 May 2011 34	Hannover 96	3–1	1. FC Nürnberg	Hanover
15:30 CEST (UTC+02:00)	Cherundolo (yellow card) 19'; Haggui 30'; Rausch 60'; Ya Konan 78' (pen.), (yellow card) 79'	Report	Wollscheid (yellow card) 18'; Wießmeier 25'; Simons (yellow card) 27'	Stadium: AWD-Arena; Attendance: 49,000; Referee: Knut Kircher

=== DFB-Pokal ===
14 August 2010 1st Round	SV Elversberg	0–0 (a.e.t.) (5–4 p)	Hannover 96	Spiesen-Elversberg
19:30		Report	Ya Konan (yellow card) 74'; Stindl (yellow card) 102'	Stadium: Waldstadion an der Kaiserlinde; Attendance: 3,500; Referee: Tobias Welz
	Penalties
	Kozarac (penalty scored); El Idrissi (penalty scored); Reiß (penalty scored); Güral (penalty scored); Zerić (penalty scored)		(penalty scored) Stindl; (penalty missed) Forssell; (penalty scored) Ya Konan; (penalty scored) Schulz; (penalty scored) Pinto

== Statistics ==
=== Appearances and goals ===
As of 14 May 2011

No.	Pos	Player	Bundesliga		DFB-Pokal		Total	
No.	Pos	Player	Apps	Goals	Apps	Goals	Apps	Goals
1	GK	(Germany) Florian Fromlowitz	19+1	0	1	0	21	0
3	DF	(Denmark) Leon Andreasen	0	0	0	0	0	0
4	DF	(Austria) Emanuel Pogatetz	28	0	1	0	29	0
5	DF	(Switzerland) Mario Eggimann	5+7	0	0	0	12	0
6	DF	(United States) Steve Cherundolo	33	0	1	0	34	0
7	MF	(Portugal) Sérgio Pinto	31	5	1	0	32	5
8	MF	(Albania) Altin Lala	2+8	0	0	0	10	0
9	FW	(Germany) Mike Hanke	10+11	3	1	0	22	3
11	FW	(Ivory Coast) Didier Ya Konan	28	14	1	0	29	14
13	FW	(Germany) Jan Schlaudraff	16+5	4	1	0	22	4
14	GK	(Germany) Markus Miller	0	0	0	0	0	0
15	DF	(Ivory Coast) Constant Djakpa	5+9	0	0	0	14	0
16	MF	(United States) DaMarcus Beasley	0+4	0	0	0	4	0
17	MF	(Germany) Moritz Stoppelkamp	10+13	0	0+1	0	24	0
19	DF	(Germany) Christian Schulz	33	4	1	0	34	4
20	GK	(Germany) Ron-Robert Zieler	15	0	0	0	15	0
21	DF	(Tunisia) Karim Haggui	25	1	1	0	26	1
22	MF	(Albania) Valdet Rama	0	0	0	0	0	0
23	DF	(Tunisia) Sofian Chahed	2+16	0	0	0	18	0
25	FW	(Norway) Mohammed Abdellaoue	26	10	0	0	26	10
28	FW	(Germany) Lars Stindl	23+10	2	0+1	0	34	2
30	MF	(Portugal) Carlitos	2+4	0	1	0	7	0
31	MF	(Germany) Tim Hofmann	0	0	0	0	0	0
32	FW	(Finland) Mikael Forssell	1+11	0	0+1	0	13	0
33	MF	(Germany) Manuel Schmiedebach	31+1	0	1	0	33	0
34	MF	(Germany) Konstantin Rausch	34	5	0	0	34	5
35	MF	(Germany) Christopher Avevor	3+2	0	0	0	5	0
36	MF	(Germany) Willi Evseev	0	0	0	0	0	0
37	DF	(Germany) Felix Burmeister	0	0	0	0	0	0

=== Goalscorers ===
Rank	No.	Pos	Name	Bundesliga	DFB-Pokal	Total
1	11	FW	(Ivory Coast) Didier Ya Konan	14	0	14
2	25	FW	(Norway) Mohammed Abdellaoue	10	0	10
3	7	MF	(Portugal) Sérgio Pinto	5	0	5
3	34	DF	(Germany) Konstantin Rausch	5	0	5
5	13	FW	(Germany) Jan Schlaudraff	4	0	4
5	19	DF	(Germany) Christian Schulz	4	0	4
7	9	FW	(Germany) Mike Hanke	3	0	3
8	28	FW	(Germany) Lars Stindl	2	0	2
9	21	DF	(Tunisia) Karim Haggui	1	0	1
Total				49	0	49

=== Clean sheets ===
Rank	No.	Pos	Name	Bundesliga	DFB-Pokal	Total
1	20	GK	(Germany) Ron-Robert Zieler	6	0	6
2	1	GK	(Germany) Florian Fromlowitz	4	1	5
Total				10	1	11

=== Disciplinary record ===
Rank	No.	Pos	Name	Bundesliga			DFB-Pokal			Total		
Rank	No.	Pos	Name	Yellow card	(yellow card) (yellow-red card)	Red card	Yellow card	(yellow card) (yellow-red card)	Red card	Yellow card	(yellow card) (yellow-red card)	Red card
1	7	MF	(Portugal) Sérgio Pinto	11	0	0	0	0	0	11	0	0
2	33	MF	(Germany) Manuel Schmiedebach	7	1	0	0	0	0	7	1	0
3	6	DF	(United States) Steve Cherundolo	5	1	0	0	0	0	5	1	0
3	21	DF	(Tunisia) Karim Haggui	3	0	1	0	0	0	3	0	1
5	4	DF	(Austria) Emanuel Pogatetz	4	1	0	0	0	0	4	1	0
5	11	FW	(Ivory Coast) Didier Ya Konan	6	0	0	1	0	0	7	0	0
5	28	FW	(Germany) Lars Stindl	6	0	0	1	0	0	7	0	0
8	19	DF	(Germany) Christian Schulz	4	0	0	0	0	0	4	0	0
9	1	GK	(Germany) Florian Fromlowitz	2	0	0	0	0	0	2	0	0
9	23	DF	(Tunisia) Sofian Chahed	2	0	0	0	0	0	2	0	0
11	13	FW	(Germany) Jan Schlaudraff	1	0	0	0	0	0	1	0	0
11	20	GK	(Germany) Ron-Robert Zieler	1	0	0	0	0	0	1	0	0
11	25	FW	(Norway) Mohammed Abdellaoue	1	0	0	0	0	0	1	0	0
11	34	MF	(Germany) Konstantin Rausch	1	0	0	0	0	0	1	0	0
Total				38	3	1	2	0	0	39	3	1
