= 2012–13 Hannover 96 season =

Hannover 96
2012–13 season
- Sporting Director: Martin Kind
- Manager: Mirko Slomka
- Stadium: AWD-Arena, Hanover, Lower Saxony
- Bundesliga: 10th
- DFB-Pokal: Third round
- Europa League: Round of 32
- Top goalscorer: League: Mame Biram Diouf (12); All: Mame Biram Diouf (17)
- Highest home attendance: 49,000 vs. Multiple Opponents
- Lowest home attendance: 32,300 vs. Greuther Fürth
| Home colours | Away colours | Third colours |

The 2012–13 Hannover 96 season is the 117th season in the club's football history. In 2012–13 the club plays in the Fußball-Bundesliga, the top tier of German football. It is the clubs eleventh consecutive season in this league, having been promoted from the 2. Bundesliga in 2002.

The club also took part in the 2012–13 edition of the DFB-Pokal, the German Cup, where it reached the third round and faced the cup holders, Borussia Dortmund before being knocked out of the tournament on a 5–1 loss.

In Europe, the club qualified for the 2012–13 edition of the Europa League, where it played Anzhi Makhachkala in the Europa League Round of 32.

== Matches ==
=== Legend ===
Win Draw Loss Postponed

=== Friendly matches ===
| 29 June 2012 | Grone (Germany) | 0–5 | (Germany) Hannover 96 |
| 19:00 | | | Aycicek; Andreasen; Rausch; Hauger |

| 30 June 2012 | RSV Göttingen 05 (Germany) | 0–3 | (Germany) Hannover 96 |
| 17:00 | | | Rausch; Schlaudraff; Pinto |

| 6 July 2012 | Ramlingen-Ehlershausen (Germany) | 1–6 | (Germany) Hannover 96 |
| 19:00 | | | Schlaudraff; Schünemann; Aycicek; Abdellaoue; Ya Konan |

| 8 July 2012 | Concordia Ihrhove (Germany) | 0–9 | (Germany) Hannover 96 |
| 14:00 | | | Ya Konan; Abdellaoue; Andreasen; Pinto |

| 13 July 2012 | Preußen Münster (Germany) | 2–0 | (Germany) Hannover 96 |
| 18:30 | Nazarov; Taylor |

| 18 July 2012 | Hannover 96 (Germany) | 0–4 | (Germany) Hertha BSC | Hildesheim |
| 18:30 | | report | Beichler 37', 68'; Andreasen 47' (o.g.); Ronny 89' | Stadium: Friedrich-Ebert-Stadion; Attendance: 3,680; Referee: Florian Meyer |

| 28 July 2012 | Wisła Kraków (Poland) | 1–1 | (Germany) Hannover 96 |
| 17:00 | Genkov 90' | | Huszti 28' |

| 11 August 2012 | Hannover 96 (Germany) | 3–4 | (England) Manchester United | Hanover |
| 20:20 | Sobiech 26'; Haggui 48'; Abdellaoue 65' | | Hernández 31'; Rooney 69', 82' (pen.); Kagawa 85' | Stadium: AWD-Arena; Attendance: 35,800 |

=== Bundesliga ===
| 26 August 2012 1 | Hannover 96 | 2–2 | Schalke 04 | Hannover |
| 17:30 | Stindl (yellow card) 23'; Felipe 43'; Nikçi 80' | Report | Draxler (yellow card) 29'; Huntelaar 52'; Jones (yellow card) 54'; Holtby (yellow card) 55', (goal) 64' | Stadium: AWD-Arena; Attendance: 49,000; Referee: Felix Brych |

| 2 September 2012 2 | VfL Wolfsburg | 0–4 | Hannover 96 | Wolfsburg |
| 15:30 | Naldo (yellow card) 22'; Pogatetz (yellow card) 28'; Knoche (yellow card) 51' (yellow-red card) 65' | Report | Haggui 10'; Sobiech 26', 56'; Andreasen 52'; Stindl (yellow card) 63' | Stadium: Volkswagen Arena; Attendance: 29,451; Referee: Wolfgang Stark |

| 15 September 2012 3 | Hannover 96 | 3–2 | Werder Bremen | Hannover |
| 15:30 | Haggui (yellow card) 3'; Huszti 6'; Andreasen 10'; Schlaudraff (yellow card) 31'; Pinto (yellow card) 88'; Huszti 90+2', (yellow card) 90+4' (yellow-red card) 90+4' | Report | Hunt 26' (pen.); Bergfrede (yellow card) 30'; Papastathopoulos (yellow card) 55'; De Bruyne 74'; Junuzović (yellow card) 75' | Stadium: AWD-Arena; Attendance: 49,000; Referee: Deniz Aytekin |

| 23 September 2012 4 | 1899 Hoffenheim | 3–1 | Hannover 96 | Sinsheim |
| 17:30 | Johnson 27'; Williams (yellow card) 36'; Beck (yellow card) 64'; Salihović 82'; Williams 90+2' | Report | Delpierre 26' (o.g.); Felipe (yellow card) 56'; Eggimann (yellow card) 90' | Stadium: WIRSOL Rhein-Neckar-Arena; Attendance: 23,575; Referee: Marco Fritz |

| 26 September 2012 5 | Hannover 96 | 4–1 | 1. FC Nürnberg | Hannover |
| 20:00 | Stindl 21'; Huszti 29'; Haggui (yellow card) 40'; Schmiedebach (yellow card) 40'; Ya Konan (yellow card) 43', (goal) 52', 64' | Report | Chandler 73'; Gebhart (yellow card) 81'; Pinola (yellow card) 90' | Stadium: AWD-Arena; Attendance: 36,200; Referee: Daniel Siebert |

| 29 September 2012 6 | Hamburger SV | 1–0 | Hannover 96 | Hamburg |
| 15:30 | Iličević (yellow card) 2'; Rudņevs 20'; Arslan (yellow card) 38'; Badelj (yellow card) 63' | Report | Haggui (yellow card) 47' | Stadium: Imtech-Arena; Attendance: 57,000; Referee: Felix Zwayer |

| 7 October 2012 7 | Hannover 96 | 1–1 | Borussia Dortmund | Hannover |
| 17:30 | Sobiech (yellow card) 10'; Cherundolo (yellow card) 54'; Schlaudraff (yellow card) 79'; Stindl (yellow card) 82'; Diouf 86' | Report | Lewandowski 26' | Stadium: AWD-Arena; Attendance: 49,000; Referee: Peter Gagelmann |

| 20 October 2012 8 | Eintracht Frankfurt | 3–1 | Hannover 96 | Frankfurt |
| 15:30 | Matmour 5'; Jung 18'; Schwegler (yellow card) 80'; Zambrano (yellow card) 80'; Meier 83' | Report | Huszti (yellow card) 15'; Abdellaoue 43'; Pinto (yellow card) 60'; Diouf (yellow card) 80'; Ya Konan (yellow card) 85' | Stadium: Commerzbank-Arena; Attendance: 50,500; Referee: Christian Dingert |

| 28 October 2012 9 | Hannover 96 | 2–3 | Borussia Mönchengladbach | Hannover |
| 17:30 | Schlaudraff 48'; Diouf 53'; Sakai (yellow card) 56'; Haggui (yellow card) 68' | Report | Stranzl (yellow card) 52'; Domínguez 70'; Brouwers 77'; Arango 79' | Stadium: AWD-Arena; Attendance: 49,000; Referee: Thorsten Kinhofer |

| 3 November 2012 10 | Hannover 96 | 2–0 | FC Augsburg | Hannover |
| 15:30 | Diouf 26'; Stindl 85' | Report | | Stadium: AWD-Arena; Attendance: 41,200; Referee: J. Drees |

| 11 November 2012 11 | VfB Stuttgart | 2–4 | Hannover 96 | Stuttgart |
| 17:30 | Genter 21'; Ibišević 37' (pen.); Kuzmanović (yellow card) 42'; Boka (yellow card) 73' | Report | Huszti (yellow card) 33'; Schmiedebach (yellow card) 46'; Sobiech 57'; Diouf (yellow card) 62'; Schlaudraff 65' (pen.); Abdellaoue 68', 73' (pen.) | Stadium: Mercedes-Benz Arena; Attendance: 50,600; Referee: F. Brych |

| 17 November 2012 12 | Hannover 96 | 1–2 | SC Freiburg | Hannover |
| 15:30 | Abdellaoue 33' (pen.) | Report | Schmid 11'; Rosenthal 55' | Stadium: AWD-Arena; Attendance: 43,800; Referee: D. Aytekin |

| 24 November 2012 13 | Bayern Munich | 5–0 | Hannover 96 | Munich |
| 15:30 | Martínez 3'; Kroos 24'; Ribéry 37'; Dante 63'; Gómez 67' | Report | | Stadium: Allianz Arena; Attendance: 71,000; Referee: F. Zwayer |

| 27 November 2012 14 | Hannover 96 | 2–0 | Greuther Fürth | Hannover |
| 20:00 | Diouf 4'; Eggimann 69'; Schmiedebach (yellow card) 73' | Report | Kleine (yellow card) 76' | Stadium: AWD-Arena; Attendance: 32,300; Referee: Marco Fritz |

| 1 December 2012 15 | Mainz 05 | 2–1 | Hannover 96 | Mainz |
| 15:30 | Müller 10'; Szalai 89' | Report | Schulz 28' | Stadium: Coface Arena; Attendance: 28,277; Referee: G. Perl |

| 9 December 2012 16 | Hannover 96 | 3–2 | Bayer Leverkusen | Hannover |
| 17:30 | Huszti 20', 69'; Diouf 57' | Report | Castro 2'; Kießling 58' | Stadium: AWD-Arena; Attendance: 45,800; Referee: T. Welz |

| 15 December 2012 17 | Fortuna Düsseldorf | 2–1 | Hannover 96 | Düsseldorf |
| 15:30 | Schahin 39'; Ilsø 83' | Report | Diouf 69' | Stadium: Esprit Arena; Attendance: 47,623; Referee: K. Kircher |

| 18 January 2013 18 | Schalke 04 | 5–4 | Hannover 96 | Gelsenkirchen |
| | Farfán 44'; Draxler 49'; Höger 64'; Marica 67'; Holtby 88' | Report | Pinto 55'; Huszti 59', 68'; Diouf 90+2' | Stadium: Veltins-Arena; Attendance: 60,811 |

| 26 January 2013 19 | Hannover 96 | 2–1 | VfL Wolfsburg | Hannover |
| | Abdellaoue 3'; Diouf 38' | Report | Madlung 46' | Stadium: AWD-Arena; Attendance: 38,880 |

| 1 February 2013 20 | Werder Bremen | 2–0 | Hannover 96 | Bremen |
| | Petersen 85', 88' | Report | | Stadium: Weserstadion; Attendance: 41,600 |

| 9 February 2013 21 | Hannover 96 | 1–0 | 1899 Hoffenheim | Hannover |
| | Diouf 8' | Report | | Stadium: AWD-Arena; Attendance: 35,200 |

| 17 February 2013 22 | 1. FC Nürnberg | 2–2 | Hannover 96 | Nuremberg |
| | Klose 53'; Polter 90+2' | Report | Huszti 41'; Ya Konan 68' | Stadium: Frankenstadion; Attendance: 36,101 |

| 23 February 2013 23 | Hannover 96 | 5–1 | Hamburger SV | Hannover |
| | Diouf 7'; Huszti 39' (pen.); Ya Konan 45', 68'; Abdellaoue 85' | Report | van der Vaart 13' | Stadium: AWD-Arena; Attendance: 49,000 |

| 2 March 2013 24 | Borussia Dortmund | 3–1 | Hannover 96 | Dortmund |
| | Lewandowski 8', 21'; Schieber 72' | Report | Abdellaoue 40' | Stadium: Westfalenstadion; Attendance: 80,645 |

| 10 March 2013 25 | Hannover 96 | 0–0 | Eintracht Frankfurt | Hannover |
| | | Report | | Stadium: AWD-Arena; Attendance: 44,800 |

| 17 March 2013 26 | Borussia Mönchengladbach | 1–0 | Hannover 96 | Mönchengladbach |
| | De Jong 36' | Report | | Stadium: Borussia-Park; Attendance: 46,173 |

| 30 March 2013 27 | FC Augsburg | 0–2 | Hannover 96 | Augsburg |
| | | Report | Rausch 61', 90+1' | Stadium: SGL arena Attendance: 28,511 |

| 7 April 2013 28 | Hannover 96 | 0–0 | VfB Stuttgart | Hannover |
| | | Report | | Stadium: AWD-Arena; Attendance: 46,000 |

| 12 April 2013 29 | SC Freiburg | 3–1 | Hannover 96 | Freiburg im Breisgau |
| | Schulz 24' (o.g.); Kruse 44'; Schmid 73' | Report | Rausch 36' | Stadium: Dreisamstadion; Attendance: 24,000 |

| 20 April 2013 30 | Hannover 96 | 1–6 | Bayern Munich | Hannover |
| | Hoffmann 84' | Report | Stindl 16' (o.g.); Ribéry 23'; Gómez 40', 62'; Pizarro 71', 86' | Stadium: AWD-Arena; Attendance: 49,000 |

| 26 April 2013 31 | Greuther Fürth | 2–3 | Hannover 96 | Fürth |
| | Đurđić 41', 83' | Report | Abdellaoue 36'; Hoffmann 71'; Pinto 87' | Stadium: Trolli Arena; Attendance: 15,370 |

| 4 May 2013 32 | Hannover 96 | 2–2 | Mainz 05 | Hannover |
| | Sobiech 36'; Diouf 70' | Report | Müller 25', 79' | Stadium: AWD-Arena; Attendance: 47,000 |

| 11 May 2013 33 | Bayer Leverkusen | 3–1 | Hannover 96 | Leverkusen |
| | Hegeler 6', 59'; Kießling 28' | Report | Sobiech 71' | Stadium: BayArena; Attendance: 29,904 |

| 18 May 2013 34 | Hannover 96 | 3–0 | Fortuna Düsseldorf | Hannover |
| | Diouf 36'; Ya Konan 61', 76' | Report | | Stadium: AWD-Arena; Attendance: 49,000 |

| Pos | Team | Pld | W | D | L | GF | GA | GD | Pts |
|---|---|---|---|---|---|---|---|---|---|
| 7 | Hamburger SV | 34 | 14 | 6 | 14 | 42 | 53 | −11 | 48 |
| 8 | Borussia Mönchengladbach | 34 | 12 | 11 | 11 | 45 | 49 | −4 | 47 |
| 9 | Hannover 96 | 34 | 13 | 6 | 15 | 60 | 62 | −2 | 45 |
| 10 | 1. FC Nürnberg | 34 | 11 | 11 | 12 | 39 | 47 | −8 | 44 |
| 11 | VfL Wolfsburg | 34 | 10 | 13 | 11 | 47 | 52 | −5 | 43 |

Source: Bundesliga.de, kicker.de
Rules for classification: 1) points; 2) goal difference; 3) number of goals scored.

=== DFB-Pokal ===
| 19 August 2012 1st Round | FC Nöttingen | 1–6 | Hannover 96 | Remchingen |
| 14:30 | Neziraj 53'; Schenker (yellow card) 78' | Report | Pinto 27', 32'; Andreasen 47'; Schlaudraff 55', 83'; Felipe (yellow card) 56'; Huszti (yellow card) 75'; Rausch 79' | Stadium: Panoramastadion; Attendance: 3,168; Referee: Benjamin Cortus |

| 31 October 2012 2nd Round | Hannover 96 | 1–1 (a.e.t.) (4–3 p) | Dynamo Dresden | Hannover |
| 20:30 | Diouf 15' | Report | Brégerie 28' | Stadium: AWD-Arena; Attendance: 35,000; Referee: Wolfgang Stark (Ergolding) |
| | Penalties |
| | Stindl (penalty scored); Schmiedebach (penalty scored); Rausch (penalty scored); Sobiech (penalty missed); Schlaudraff (penalty scored) | | (penalty missed) Losilla; (penalty scored) Fiél; (penalty scored) Solga; (penalty scored) Jungwirth; (penalty missed) Poté |

| 19 December 2012 Round of 16 | Borussia Dortmund | 5–1 | Hannover 96 | Dortmund |
| 20:30 | Götze 3', 40', 84'; Błaszczykowski 18'; Lewandowski 90' | Report | Cherundolo (yellow card) 38'; Schmiedebach (yellow card) 62'; Diouf 79' | Stadium: Westfalenstadion; Attendance: 77,615; Referee: Felix Brych |

=== UEFA Europa League ===
==== Third qualifying round ====
| 2 August 2012 1st Leg | St Patrick's Athletic (Republic of Ireland) | 0–3 | (Germany) Hannover 96 | Dublin, Ireland |
| 20:45 | | Report | 6' Andreasen; 67' Pander; 80' Ya Konan | Stadium: Tallaght Stadium; Referee: Tamás Bognár (Hungary) |

| 8 August 2012 2nd Leg | Hannover 96 (Germany) | 2–0 (5–0 agg.) | (Republic of Ireland) St Patrick's Athletic | Hannover, Germany |
| 20:30 | Haggui 32'; Eggimann 47' | Report | | Stadium: AWD-Arena; Attendance: 24.500; Referee: Anar Salmanov (Azerbaijan) |

==== Playoff round ====
| 23 August 2012 1st Leg | Śląsk Wrocław (Poland) | 3–5 | (Germany) Hannover 96 | Wrocław, Poland |
| 20:45 | Jodłowiec 34'; Patejuk 54'; Kaźmierczak 61' | Report | Andreasen 7', 82'; Schlaudraff 25'; Stindl 40'; Schmiedebach 85' | Stadium: Stadion Miejski; Attendance: 13.644; Referee: Paolo Tagliavento |

| 30 August 2012 2nd Leg | Hannover 96 (Germany) | 5–1 (10–4 agg.) | (Poland) Śląsk Wrocław | Hannover, Germany |
| 20:45 | Abdellaoue 22'; Huszti 35', 88'; Sobiech 68', 85' | Report | Kaźmierczak 10' | Stadium: AWD-Arena; Attendance: 26.200; Referee: Anton Averianov |

==== Group stage ====
| Pos | Team | Pld | W | D | L | GF | GA | GD | Pts | Qualification |
|---|---|---|---|---|---|---|---|---|---|---|
| 1 | (Germany) Hannover 96 | 6 | 3 | 3 | 0 | 11 | 8 | +3 | 12 | Advance to knockout phase |
| 2 | (Spain) Levante | 6 | 3 | 2 | 1 | 10 | 5 | +5 | 11 | Advance to knockout phase |
| 3 | (Sweden) Helsingborgs IF | 6 | 1 | 1 | 4 | 9 | 12 | −3 | 4 (Note: Head-to-head points: Helsingborg 4, Twente 1.) | |
| 4 | (Netherlands) Twente | 6 | 0 | 4 | 2 | 5 | 10 | −5 | 4 | |

Source: Soccerway
Notes:

| 20 September 2012 1 | FC Twente (Netherlands) | 2–2 | (Germany) Hannover 96 | Enschede, Netherlands |
| 21:05 | Janssen 7'; Chadli 54' | Report | Sobiech 67'; Wisgerhof 73' (o.g.) | Stadium: De Grolsch Veste; Attendance: 22,500; Referee: Mike Dean (England) |

| 4 October 2012 2 | Hannover 96 (Germany) | 2–1 | (Spain) Levante UD | Hannover, Germany |
| 19:00 | Huszti 21' (pen.); Ya Konan 49' | Report | Míchel 10' (pen.) | Stadium: AWD-Arena; Attendance: 34,600; Referee: Liran Liany (Israel) |

| 25 October 2012 3 | Helsingborgs IF (Sweden) | 1–2 | (Germany) Hannover 96 | Helsingborg, Sweden |
| 19:00 | Bouaouzan (yellow card) 41'; Đurđić (yellow card) 71'; Álvaro 90+1' | Report | Diouf 12'; Stindl (yellow card) 75'; Ya Konan 90+3' | Stadium: Olympia; Attendance: 5,500; Referee: Steven Studer (Switzerland) |

| 8 November 2012 4 | Hannover 96 (Germany) | 3–2 | (Sweden) Helsingborgs IF | Hannover, Germany |
| 21:05 | Diouf 3', 50'; Stindl (yellow card) 66'; Huszti 90' (pen.) | Report | Lindström (yellow card) 28'; Đurđić 59'; Bedoya 67', (yellow card) 75'; Larsson (red card) 89'; Atta (red card) 89' | Stadium: AWD-Arena; Attendance: 36,000; Referee: Fredy Fautrel |

| 22 November 2012 5 | Hannover 96 (Germany) | 0–0 | (Netherlands) FC Twente | Hanover, Germany |
| 19:00 | Eggimann (yellow card) 72'; Pinto (yellow card) 85' | Report (in German) | Fer (yellow card) 90' | Stadium: AWD-Arena; Attendance: 35,800; Referee: Alexey Kulbalkov |

| 6 December 2012 6 | Levante UD (Spain) | 2–2 | (Germany) Hannover 96 | Valencia, Spain |
| 21:05 | El Zhar (yellow card) 14'; Ángel 49'; Iborra 90+4' | Report | Stindl 18', (yellow card) 35'; Rausch (yellow card) 23'; Ya Konan 26'; Pinto (yellow card) 43'; Schulz (yellow card) 77'; Diouf (yellow card) 81'; Nikçi (yellow card) 90+1' | Stadium: Estadi Ciutat de València; Attendance: 14,420; Referee: Alexandru Tudor (Romania) |

==== Round of 32 ====
| 14 February 2013 First leg | Anzhi Makhachkala (Russia) | 3–1 | (Germany) Hannover 96 | Moscow, Russia |
| 18:00 | Eto'o 34'; Ahmedov 48'; Boussoufa 64' | | Huszti 22' | Stadium: Luzhniki Stadium; Attendance: 7,000; Referee: Marijo Strahonja (Croatia) |

| 21 February 2013 Second leg | Hannover 96 (Germany) | 1–1 (2–4 agg.) | (Russia) Anzhi Makhachkala | Hannover, Germany |
| 21:05 | Pinto 70' | | Traoré 90' | Stadium: AWD-Arena; Referee: Jonas Eriksson (Sweden) |

== Squad ==
| Player | | | | | | Bundesliga | | DFB-Pokal | | Europa League | | Totals | |
| No. | Player | Nat. | Birthday | at Hannover since | Previous club | Matches | Goals | Matches | Goal | Matches | Goals | Matches | Goals |
Goalkeepers
| 1 | Ron-Robert Zieler | (Germany) | 12 February 1989 | 2010 | Manchester United | 34 | 0 | 3 | 0 | 12 | 0 | 49 | 0 |
| 14 | Markus Miller | (Germany) | 8 April 1982 | 2010 | Karlsruher SC | 0 | 0 | 0 | 0 | 0 | 0 | 0 | 0 |
| 21 | Christofer Heimeroth | (Germany) | 7 November 1992 | 2010 | SV Ried | 0 | 0 | 0 | 0 | 0 | 0 | 0 | 0 |
Defenders
| 2 | Leon Andreasen | (Denmark) | 23 April 1983 | 2010 | Fulham F.C. | 5 | 2 | 1 | 1 | 5 | 3 | 11 | 6 |
| 3 | Karim Haggui | (Tunisia) | 20 January 1984 | 2009 | Bayer Leverkusen | 22 | 1 | 3 | 0 | 8 | 1 | 33 | 2 |
| 4 | Hiroki Sakai | (Japan) | 12 April 1990 | 2012 | Kashiwa Reysol | 13 | 0 | 1 | 0 | 3 | 0 | 17 | 0 |
| 5 | Mario Eggimann | (Switzerland) | 24 January 1981 | 2008 | Karlsruher SC | 22 | 1 | 2 | 0 | 8 | 1 | 32 | 2 |
| 6 | Steve Cherundolo | (United States) | 19 February 1979 | 1999 | University of Portland Pilots | 20 | 0 | 3 | 0 | 10 | 0 | 33 | 0 |
| 15 | André Hoffmann | (Germany) | 18 February 1993 | 2013 | MSV Duisburg | 16 | 2 | 0 | 0 | 0 | 0 | 16 | 2 |
| 17 | Johan Djourou | (Switzerland) | 18 January 1987 | 2013 | Arsenal F.C. | 14 | 0 | 0 | 0 | 2 | 0 | 16 | 0 |
| 18 | Sébastien Pocognoli | (Belgium) | 1 August 1987 | 2013 | Standard Liège | 11 | 0 | 0 | 0 | 2 | 0 | 13 | 0 |
| 19 | Christian Schulz | (Germany) | 1 April 1983 | 2007 | Werder Bremen | 19 | 1 | 1 | 0 | 9 | 0 | 29 | 1 |
| 20 | Felipe | (Brazil) | 15 May 1987 | 2012 | Standard Liège | 4 | 1 | 1 | 0 | 3 | 0 | 8 | 1 |
| 23 | Sofian Chahed | (Tunisia) | 18 April 1983 | 2009 | Hertha BSC | 13 | 0 | 0 | 0 | 1 | 0 | 14 | 0 |
| 24 | Christian Pander | (Germany) | 28 August 1983 | 2011 | Schalke 04 | 18 | 0 | 3 | 0 | 6 | 1 | 27 | 1 |
| 34 | Konstantin Rausch | (Germany) | 15 March 1990 | 2004 | SV Nienhagen | 30 | 3 | 2 | 1 | 10 | 0 | 41 | 4 |
| 35 | Christopher Avevor | (Germany) | 11 February 1992 | 2008 | Holstein Kiel | 0 | 0 | 0 | 0 | 0 | 0 | 0 | 0 |
Midfielders
| 7 | Sérgio Pinto | (Portugal) | 16 October 1980 | 2007 | Alemannia Aachen | 30 | 2 | 3 | 2 | 10 | 1 | 43 | 5 |
| 8 | Manuel Schmiedebach | (Germany) | 5 December 1988 | 2006 | Hertha BSC | 21 | 0 | 3 | 0 | 12 | 1 | 36 | 1 |
| 10 | Szabolcs Huszti | (Hungary) | 18 April 1983 | 2012 | Zenit Saint Petersburg | 21 | 9 | 2 | 0 | 12 | 5 | 35 | 14 |
| 22 | Adrian Nikçi | (Switzerland) | 10 November 1989 | 2012 | FC Zürich | 4 | 1 | 0 | 0 | 4 | 0 | 8 | 1 |
| 26 | Deniz Aycicek | (Germany) | 5 June 1990 | --- | --- | 0 | 0 | 0 | 0 | 0 | 0 | 0 | 0 |
| 28 | Lars Stindl | (Germany) | 26 August 1988 | 2010 | Karlsruher SC | 18 | 2 | 2 | 0 | 9 | 2 | 29 | 4 |
| 31 | Jannis Plaeschke | (Germany) | 6 February 1993 | --- | --- | 0 | 0 | 0 | 0 | 0 | 0 | 0 | 0 |
| 36 | Willi Evseev | (Germany) | 14 February 1992 | --- | --- | 0 | 0 | 0 | 0 | 0 | 0 | 0 | 0 |
Forwards
| 9 | Artur Sobiech | (Poland) | 12 June 1990 | 2011 | Polonia Warszawa | 25 | 5 | 2 | 0 | 10 | 3 | 37 | 8 |
| 11 | Didier Ya Konan | (Ivory Coast) | 22 May 1984 | 2009 | Rosenborg BK | 28 | 7 | 3 | 0 | 10 | 4 | 41 | 11 |
| 13 | Jan Schlaudraff | (Germany) | 18 July 1983 | 2008 | Bayern Munich | 30 | 2 | 3 | 2 | 9 | 1 | 42 | 5 |
| 25 | Mohammed Abdellaoue | (Norway) | 23 October 1985 | 2010 | Vålerenga | 26 | 8 | 1 | 0 | 8 | 1 | 35 | 9 |
| 27 | Deniz Kadah | (Turkey) | 2 March 1986 | 2012 | VfB Lübeck | 2 | 0 | 0 | 0 | 0 | 0 | 2 | 0 |
| 39 | Mame Biram Diouf | (Senegal) | 16 December 1987 | 2012 | Manchester United | 28 | 12 | 2 | 2 | 6 | 3 | 36 | 17 |

== Coaching staff ==
| Name | Job | Nationality |
|---|---|---|
| Mirko Slomka | Head coach | (Germany) |
| Norbert Düwel | Assistant coach | (Germany) |
| Nestor El Maestro | Assistant coach | (England) |
| Jörg Sievers | Goalkeeping coach | (Germany) |
| Jürgen Freiwald | Fitness coach | (Germany) |
| Ingo Geisler | Fitness coach | (Germany) |
| Edward Kowalczuk | Fitness coach | (Poland) |
| Axel Partenheimer | Club doctor | (Germany) |
| Sascha Haschemi-Fard | Club doctor | (Germany) |
| Helmut Lill | Club doctor | (Germany) |
| Björn-Niclas Pabel | Physio | (Germany) |
| Ralf Blume | Physio | (Germany) |
| Marcus Schonaich | Physio | (Germany) |
| Carlos Hernandez | Physio | (Germany) |

== Statistics ==
=== Goalscorers ===
| Rank | No. | Pos | Nat | Name | Bundesliga | DFB-Pokal | Europa League | Total |
|---|---|---|---|---|---|---|---|---|
| 1 | 39 | FW | (Senegal) | Mame Biram Diouf | 12 | 2 | 3 | 17 |
| 2 | 10 | MF | (Hungary) | Szabolcs Huszti | 9 | 0 | 5 | 14 |
| 3 | 11 | FW | (Ivory Coast) | Didier Ya Konan | 7 | 0 | 4 | 11 |
| 4 | 25 | FW | (Norway) | Mohammed Abdellaoue | 8 | 0 | 1 | 9 |
| 5 | 9 | FW | (Poland) | Artur Sobiech | 5 | 0 | 3 | 8 |
| 6 | 2 | DF | (Denmark) | Leon Andreasen | 2 | 1 | 3 | 6 |
| 7 | 7 | MF | (Portugal) | Sérgio Pinto | 2 | 2 | 1 | 5 |
| 7 | 13 | FW | (Germany) | Jan Schlaudraff | 2 | 2 | 1 | 5 |
| 9 | 28 | MF | (Germany) | Lars Stindl | 2 | 0 | 2 | 4 |
| 9 | 34 | DF | (Germany) | Konstantin Rausch | 3 | 1 | 0 | 4 |
| 11 | 3 | DF | (Tunisia) | Karim Haggui | 1 | 0 | 1 | 2 |
| 11 | 5 | DF | (Switzerland) | Mario Eggimann | 1 | 0 | 1 | 2 |
| 11 | 15 | DF | (Germany) | André Hoffmann | 2 | 0 | 0 | 2 |
| 14 | 8 | MF | (Germany) | Manuel Schmiedebach | 0 | 0 | 1 | 1 |
| 14 | 19 | DF | (Germany) | Christian Schulz | 1 | 0 | 0 | 1 |
| 14 | 20 | DF | (Brazil) | Felipe | 1 | 0 | 0 | 1 |
| 14 | 22 | MF | (Switzerland) | Adrian Nikçi | 1 | 0 | 0 | 1 |
| 14 | 24 | DF | (Germany) | Christian Pander | 0 | 0 | 1 | 1 |
| Own goal | | | | | 1 | 0 | 1 | 2 |
| Totals | | | | | 60 | 8 | 28 | 96 |

Last updated: 18 May 2013

=== Clean sheets ===
| Rank | No. | Pos | Nat | Name | Bundesliga | DFB-Pokal | Europa League | Total |
|---|---|---|---|---|---|---|---|---|
| 1 | 1 | GK | (Germany) | Ron-Robert Zieler | 8 | 0 | 3 | 11 |
| Totals | | | | | 8 | 0 | 3 | 11 |

Last updated: 18 May 2013
