= Jan Schlaudraff =

German footballer

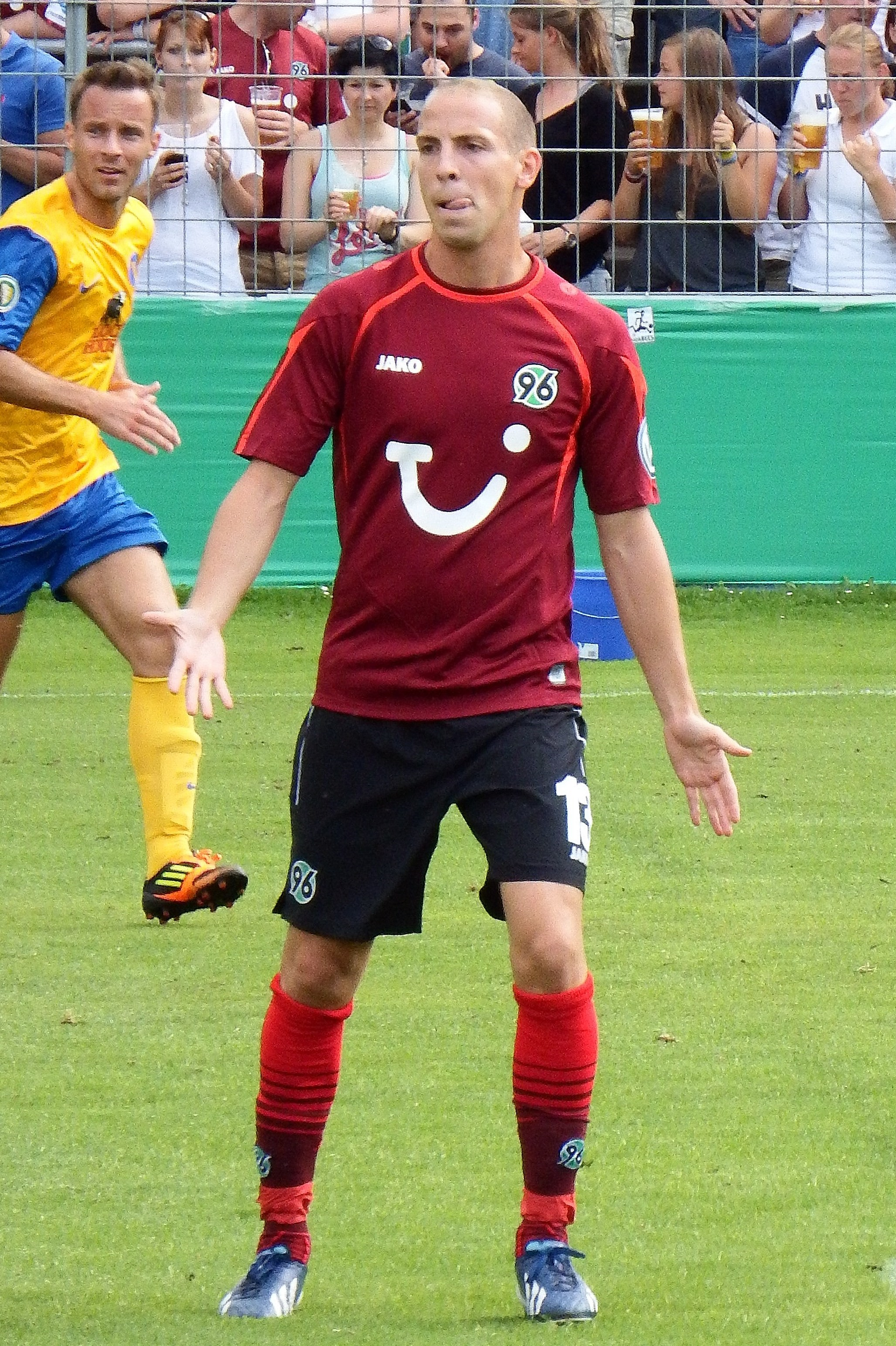
- Schlaudraff with Hannover 96 in 2013

Personal information
- Date of birth: 18 July 1983 (age 43)
- Place of birth: Waldbröl, West Germany
- Height: 1.80 m (5 ft 11 in)
- Positions: Midfielder; striker

Team information
- Current team: SKN St. Pölten (managing director of sports)

Youth career
- 1992–1996: JSG Wissen
- 1996–2002: Hassia Bingen

Senior career*
Years	Team	Apps	(Gls)
2001–2002	Hassia Bingen	16	(10)
2002–2005	Borussia Mönchengladbach	10	(0)
2002–2005	Borussia Mönchengladbach II	61	(25)
2005–2007	Alemannia Aachen	72	(19)
2007–2008	Bayern Munich	8	(0)
2007–2008	Bayern Munich II	5	(1)
2008–2015	Hannover 96	140	(17)
2009–2010	Hannover 96 II	2	(2)
Total		314	(74)

International career
2006–2007	Germany	3	(0)

Managerial career
- 2019: Hannover 96 (executive assistant)
- 2019–2020: Hannover 96 (sporting director)
- 2022–: SKN St. Pölten (managing director of sports)
- 2023: SKN St. Pölten (caretaker)
- * Club domestic league appearances and goals

Jan Schlaudraff (born 18 July 1983) is a German professional football official and a former player who played as a midfielder and striker. He is the managing director of sports for the Austrian club SKN St. Pölten.

== Club career ==
Born in Waldbröl, Schlaudraff started playing professionally for Borussia Mönchengladbach, mainly as a midfielder. During two and a half seasons he managed only ten first division appearances, the first being on 19 February 2003, as he played one minute in a 2–0 home win over VfL Wolfsburg.

Schlaudraff transferred to Alemannia Aachen in January 2005, eventually becoming a striker once more – and being named team captain. In 2005–06's second level, he netted 11 goals to help the side return to the first division after a four-decade hiatus.

Although Schlaudraff performed well in the following campaign, Alemannia dropped a level after just one season, but he caught the eye of league powerhouse Bayern Munich, for a transfer fee of €1.2 million. Competition for him was fierce, with established internationals Miroslav Klose, Luca Toni and Lukas Podolski ahead in the pecking order. Coach Ottmar Hitzfeld chose to use Schlaudraff as a substitute in a few matches, and in most cases as an attacking midfielder.

Schlaudraff's season was a disappointment individually: although Bayern clinched the title, he only managed eight appearances, netting ten goals, but in friendly matches (notably seven against SV Darmstadt 98 in a 5–11 win, and a hat-trick in Bayern's end-of-season Asian tour, against the Indonesian national team 5–1, with youngsters Toni Kroos and Breno also netting). After scoring another two goals against Indian side Mohun Bagan in a 3–0 victory, Schlaudraff's pre-season tally boasted 15 goals in just five games.

In July 2008, he moved to Hannover 96. There he was used exclusively as striker, scoring his first two goals on 14 September 2008, against former team Borussia Mönchengladbach, in a 5–1 home success.

On 18 August 2011, Schlaudraff scored both Hannover goals in their 2–1 victory over Sevilla FC in the Europa League. Hannover went on to win the game 3–2 on aggregate, qualifying for the 2011–12 UEFA Europa League group stage.

In June 2015, he left Hannover after he did not receive an extension of his expiring contract.

== International career ==
Courtesy of his Alemannia performances, Schlaudraff made his debut for Germany in October 2006 in an international friendly against Georgia in Rostock. Until March 2007 he won two additional caps.

== Managerial career ==
After retiring, Schlaudraff worked as a scout for the agent company SportsTotal. On 3 January 2019, Hannover 96 announced that Schlaudraff had returned to the club and would be working as assistant to the sporting director Gerhard Zuber, beginning with the upcoming 2019–20 season. By April 2019 he had begun his career in management, taking care of the squad planning for the upcoming season.

In January 2022, Schlaudraff was hired as a managing director of sports by the Austrian club SKN St. Pölten. Schlaudraff was interim coach from 23 October 2023, when SKN St. Pölten sacked Stephan Helm and Emanuel Pogatetz, to 11 December 2023 when Philipp Semlic was hired as the new coach. His first match as interim coach was a 1–1 draw against SV Ried and his final match was a 3–1 win against the reserve team of Sturm Graz.

== Career statistics ==
=== Club career ===
Appearances and goals by club, season and competition
Club	Season	League			Cup		Continental		Total	
Club	Season	Division	Apps	Goals	Apps	Goals	Apps	Goals	Apps	Goals
Borussia Mönchengladbach	2002–03	Bundesliga	4	0	0	0	0	0	4	0
Borussia Mönchengladbach	2003–04	Bundesliga	0	0	0	0	0	0	0	0
Borussia Mönchengladbach	2004–05	Bundesliga	6	0	1	0	0	0	7	0
Borussia Mönchengladbach	Total		10	0	1	0	0	0	11	0
Alemannia Aachen	2004–05	2. Bundesliga	15	0	0	0	1	0	16	0
Alemannia Aachen	2005–06	2. Bundesliga	29	11	0	0	0	0	29	11
Alemannia Aachen	2006–07	Bundesliga	28	8	4	2	0	0	32	10
Alemannia Aachen	Total		72	19	4	2	1	0	77	21
Bayern Munich	2007–08	Bundesliga	8	0	0	0	6	0	14	0
Bayern Munich II	2007–08	Regionalliga Süd	5	1	–		–		5	1
Hannover 96	2008–09	Bundesliga	22	5	1	1	0	0	23	6
Hannover 96	2009–10	Bundesliga	10	2	0	0	0	0	10	2
Hannover 96	2010–11	Bundesliga	21	4	1	0	0	0	22	4
Hannover 96	2011–12	Bundesliga	31	3	2	0	12	4	45	7
Hannover 96	2012–13	Bundesliga	30	2	3	2	9	1	42	5
Hannover 96	2013–14	Bundesliga	21	1	2	0	0	0	23	1
Hannover 96	2014–15	Bundesliga	5	0	2	0	0	0	7	0
Hannover 96	Total		140	17	11	3	21	5	172	25
Hannover 96 II	2009–10	Regionalliga Nord	2	2	–		–		2	2
Career total			237	39	16	5	28	5	281	49

=== Coaching record ===
As of match played on 1 December 2023

Team	From	To	Record								Ref.
Team	From	To	M	W	D	L	GF	GA	GD	Win %	Ref.
SKN St. Pölten	23 October 2023	11 December 2023	6	4	1	1	13	6	+7	66.67	
Total			6	4	1	1	13	6	+7	66.67	—

== Honours ==
Bayern Munich

- Bundesliga: 2007–08
- DFB-Pokal: 2007–08
- DFL-Ligapokal: 2007
