= Mirko Slomka =

German football manager (born 1967)

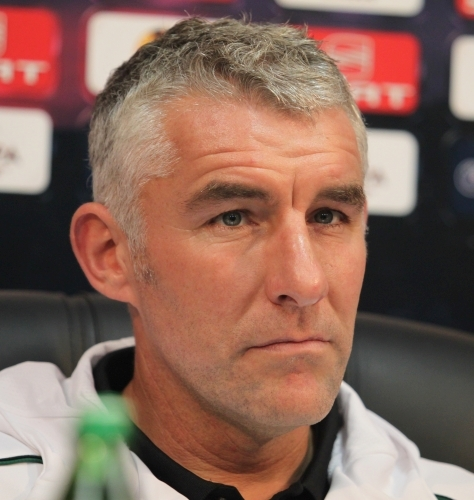
- Slomka in 2011

Personal information
- Date of birth: 12 September 1967 (age 59)
- Place of birth: Hildesheim, West Germany
- Height: 1.87 m (6 ft 2 in)

Senior career*
Years	Team	Apps	(Gls)
- JSG Nord
- SC Harsum
- TuS Lühnde
- Stern Misburg
- Fortuna Hannover
- Hannover 96

Managerial career
- 2000: Tennis Borussia Berlin
- 2006–2008: Schalke 04
- 2010–2013: Hannover 96
- 2014: Hamburger SV
- 2016–2017: Karlsruher SC
- 2019: Hannover 96
- * Club domestic league appearances and goals

Mirko Slomka (German pronunciation: [ˈmɪʁko ˈslɔmka]; born 12 September 1967) is a German football manager who last managed Hannover 96.

== Managerial career ==
=== Hannover 96 ===
From 1989 to 1999, Slomka was the manager of Hannover 96's U19 squad. Slomka coached several players, who later turned in to international players like Gerald Asamoah, Sebastian Kehl and Per Mertesacker.

=== Tennis Borussia Berlin ===
Slomka was manager of Tennis Borussia Berlin from 1 July 2000 to 17 November 2000. Before that, he coached the U19's of the club in one season. His first match was a 2–0 win against Rot-Weiss Essen on 28 July 2000. His final match was a 1–0 loss to Werder Bremen II on 11 November 2000.

=== Return to Hannover 96 ===
In 2001, Slomka returned to Hannover as assistant manager under Ralf Rangnick. He left the club at the end of the 2003–04 season.

=== Schalke 04 ===
Slomka became the manager of Schalke 04 on 4 January 2006, after serving two years as assistant manager for the club. His first match was a 2–0 win against 1. FC Kaiserslautern on 29 January 2006. He was in charge of Schalke 04 in the year FC Schalke 04 finished second in the Bundesliga after VfB Stuttgart. He also led Schalke 04 to semi-finals of UEFA cup in year 2005–06. However, they were knocked out in the first round the following season. He was given a lifeline when his side knocked out Primeira Liga Champions Porto 4–1 on penalties after a 1–1 draw on aggregate in the UEFA Champions League, but Schalke 04 were knocked out in the next round by Barcelona 2–0 on aggregate, and the final spell for him was a humiliating 5–1 defeat at the hands of title rival Werder Bremen. On 13 April 2008, the club management of Schalke 04 released Slomka from his obligations after several weak performances of the team. Slomka finished with a record of 55 wins, 27 draws, and 26 losses in 108 matches.

=== Hannover 96 ===
On 19 January 2010, Slomka became new manager of Hannover 96. His first match was a 1–0 loss against 1. FSV Mainz 05 on 23 January 2010. During the 2010–11 season, on matchdays 10 and 11, Hannover consecutive 4–0 losses to 1899 Hoffenheim and Borussia Dortmund. In the 2010–11 Bundesliga, Slomka led Hannover to a record fourth-place finish, thus qualifying for the 2011–12 UEFA Europa League. In the play-off round, Hannover clinched a victory over Sevilla with a 2–1 win at home, followed by a 1–1 draw away (3–2) and qualified for the 2011–12 UEFA Europa League group stage. Hannover started the 2012–13 season with a 3–0 win against St Patrick's Athletic on 2 August 2012 in the Europa League third qualifying round. Hannover went on to start the season on a nine–match undefeated streak.

Slomka was sacked on 27 December 2013. His final match was a 2–1 loss to SC Freiburg on 21 December 2013. He finished with a record of 71 wins, 35 draws, and 63 losses in 169 matches.

=== Hamburger SV ===
On 16 February 2014, it was reported that Slomka had become head coach of Hamburger SV pending the approval of the supervisory board. It was approved and announced the following day. He was given a contract until 2016. He is the 13th head coach of Hamburg since 2004. Slomka's first match in charge was a 3–0 win over Borussia Dortmund. Slomka was able to pick up two more victories (1. FC Nürnberg and Bayer Leverkusen). He didn't pick up a single point over the final five matches of the league season. This includes losses to Hannover 96, VfL Wolfsburg, FC Augsburg, Bayern Munich, and 1. FSV Mainz 05. Despite not picking up any points over this period, 1. FC Nürnberg and Eintracht Braunschweig were unable to catch Hamburg and they finished the season in 16th place, which led to a relegation–promotion play–off against Greuther Fürth. In the relegation–promotion play–off, the first leg ended in a 0–0 draw and the second leg ended in a 1–1 draw. The result meant that Hamburg avoided relegation. Slomka was sacked on 15 September 2014 after only one point and no goals in the 2014–15 Bundesliga season. His final match was a 2–0 loss against Hannover. Slomka launched a lawsuit against Hamburg for €1.4 million compensation. He finished with a record of three wins, five draws, and 10 losses.

=== Karlsruher SC ===
On 22 December 2016, he was appointed as the new head coach for Karlsruher SC. He was sacked on 4 April 2017. He finished with a record of two wins, two draws, and six losses.

=== Second return to Hannover 96 ===
On 28 May 2019, it was confirmed that Slomka had returned to Hannover 96 for the third time as manager for the upcoming 2019–20 season. The club hired him in its bid to secure an immediate return to the Bundesliga, as the club just had been relegated in the previous season. He was sacked on 3 November 2019.

== Coaching statistics ==
As of matches played 11 April 2021

Team	From	To	Record								
Team	From	To	M	W	D	L	GF	GA	GD	Win %	Ref.
Tennis Borussia Berlin	1 July 2000	17 November 2000	17	4	3	10	18	32	−14	23.53	
Schalke 04	4 January 2006	13 April 2008	109	55	28	26	164	103	+61	50.46	
Hannover 96	19 January 2010	27 December 2013	169	71	35	63	265	266	−1	42.01	
Hamburger SV	17 February 2014	15 September 2014	18	3	5	10	19	29	−10	16.67	
Karlsruher SC	22 December 2016	4 April 2017	10	2	2	6	10	19	−9	20.00	
Hannover 96	1 July 2019	3 November 2019	13	3	5	5	14	20	−6	23.08	
Total			336	138	78	120	490	469	+21	41.07	—
