= Steve Cherundolo =

American soccer player and coach (born 1979)

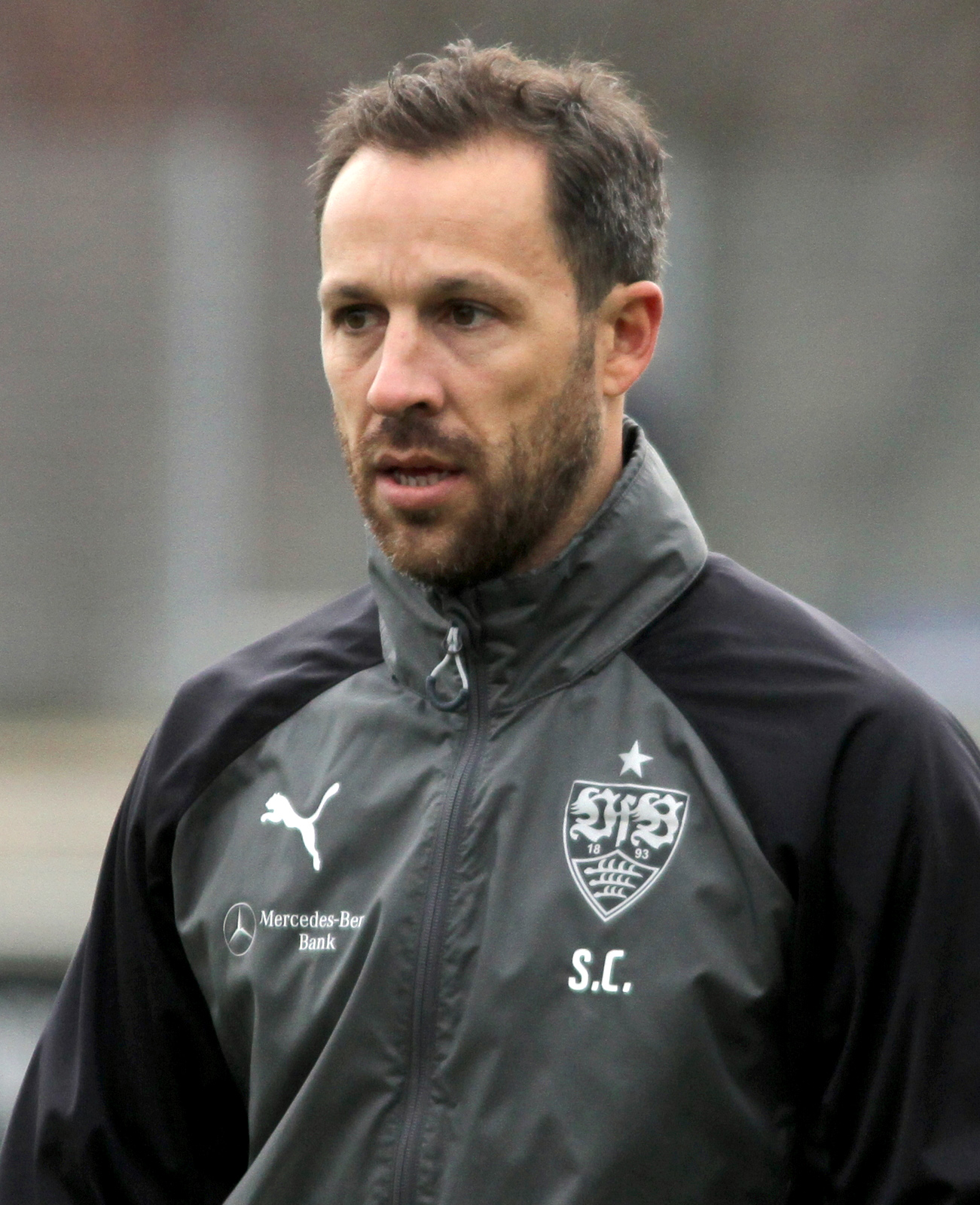
- Cherundolo with VfB Stuttgart in 2018

Personal information
- Full name: Steven Emil Cherundolo
- Date of birth: February 19, 1979 (age 47)
- Place of birth: Rockford, Illinois, U.S.
- Height: 5 ft 6 in (1.68 m)
- Position: Right-back

Team information
- Current team: United States U23 (head coach)

College career
Years	Team	Apps	(Gls)
1997–1998	Portland Pilots		

Senior career*
Years	Team	Apps	(Gls)
1999–2014	Hannover 96	370	(7)

International career
1997	United States U18	4	(0)
1998–1999	United States U20	25	(0)
1998	United States U23	1	(0)
1999–2012	United States	87	(2)

Managerial career
- 2021: Las Vegas Lights
- 2022–2025: Los Angeles FC
- 2026–: United States U23
Medal record
Men's Football
Representing United States
Winner	CONCACAF Gold Cup	2005
Runner-up	CONCACAF Gold Cup	2009
Runner-up	CONCACAF Gold Cup	2011
Men's Soccer
- * Club domestic league appearances and goals

Steven Emil Cherundolo (born February 19, 1979) is an American soccer coach and former player who is the head coach of the United States national under-23 team. A right-back, he was the captain of Hannover 96 of the German Bundesliga, where he spent his entire club career. He represented the United States at the 2006 and 2010 FIFA World Cups.

== Early life ==
Born in Rockford, Illinois, Cherundolo grew up in San Diego, California, and attended Mt. Carmel High School in Rancho Peñasquitos. As a youth, he played for the La Jolla Nomads club team, which won the California state championship six times with him.

Before joining Hannover, Cherundolo enrolled at the University of Portland and played for the Pilots soccer team from 1997 to 1998. In his freshman season, he was the West Coast Conference Freshman of the Year.

== Playing club career ==
Cherundolo joined Hannover 96, then playing in the 2. Bundesliga, for the end of the 1998–1999 season and quickly received first-team action, playing in four games his first year. Coming into the 1999–2000 season, Cherundolo established himself at the right back position, starting consistently before suffering a knee injury that kept him out until the end of the season and ended his chances of playing for the U.S. Olympic team. He continued to establish his place in the team during the 2000–2001 season, earning playing time in 18 games, including 10 starts. In the 2001–02 season, he started 30 of 34 games for the team as he helped the team gain promotion to the Bundesliga. Cherundolo maintained his position in the 2002–03 season, starting 33 games for the team, while collecting three assists. In the 2003–04 season, he continued his consistent play, appearing in 33 games for the club. Premier League side Bolton Wanderers agreed to a deal with Hannover for Cherundolo in 2005, but he declined, opting to remain in Germany. He signed another contract extension with Hannover in the summer of 2007.

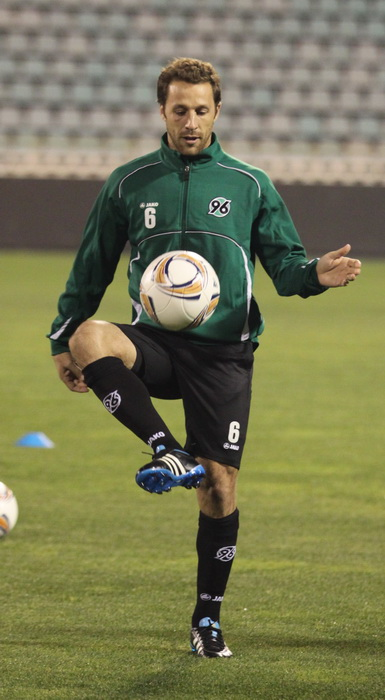
Cherundolo with Hannover 96 in 2011

Cherundolo established himself as a leader at Hannover and was appointed team captain shortly before the start of the 2010–11 season. He set the team record for Bundesliga appearances in the second to last game of the 2012–13 season. As of 2013, Cherundolo was the longest serving player in the Bundesliga. On March 19, 2014, Cherundolo announced his retirement from soccer citing failure to recover from a long-term knee injury as the main reason he left the game.

== International career ==
Cherundolo parlayed his success in the Bundesliga into a role with the United States national team. Cherundolo made his debut against Jamaica on September 8, 1999. Although he was on the roster for the 2002 FIFA World Cup (a late injury replacement for Chris Armas), Cherundolo himself was injured in training shortly before the event began and was unable to play. In the 2005 CONCACAF Gold Cup, Cherundolo sustained a knee injury from a tackle that prematurely ended his participation in the tournament. On March 22, 2006, Cherundolo played in a friendly match with the national team against Germany, whose roster included some teammates from Hannover 96. He scored his first international goal in the 4–1 loss.

On May 2, 2006, Cherundolo was named to the U.S. roster for the FIFA World Cup in Germany. On June 12, 2006, for the first time, aged 27, Cherundolo made his debut in a FIFA World Cup match against the Czech Republic, playing in the first half for the U.S., who started the tournament with a 3–0 loss. Five days later, in the second match against Italy (who later won the tournament), Cherundolo played the full 90 minutes, helping the team to a 1–1 draw at Fritz-Walter-Stadion in Kaiserslautern. After a loss against Ghana in the final match in the group, the U.S. was eliminated from the tournament, finishing the group in last place with just one point.

Cherundolo missed the 2007 CONCACAF Gold Cup due to an injury. He also missed out on the 2009 FIFA Confederations Cup due to another injury, but returned to captain the U.S. during the 2009 CONCACAF Gold Cup.

Cherundolo was one of seven defenders named to the U.S. squad for the 2010 FIFA World Cup in South Africa. He was given the number 6. In the first match of Group C against England, Cherundolo was in the starting lineup and played the full 90 minutes in a 1–1 draw at Royal Bafokeng Stadium. On June 18, he retained his position for the second match, playing in the entire game against Slovenia, which finished in a 2–2 draw, with the U.S. coming back from 2–0 down. In the 48th minute of the match, Cherundolo assisted Landon Donovan who beat Slovenian goalkeeper Samir Handanović with a powerful shot. In the final match of the group, Cherundolo again started at right back as the U.S. beat Algeria with a last-minute winner, scored by Donovan, to finish the group in first place with five points. U.S. would lose in the Round of 16 against Ghana, 2–1 after extra time. Cherundolo was an ever-present figure in this competition for the United States, playing the entire 390 minutes.

== Coaching career ==
Following his retirement announcement, Cherundolo remained with Hannover 96 as an assistant coach for Hannover's amateur team. On April 20, 2015, he was officially promoted to assistant coach of Hannover 96's first team. After the end of the 2014–15 season, Cherundolo became the head coach of Hannover's U–17 academy team.

In January 2018, Cherundolo moved to VfB Stuttgart and became assistant of the new head coach Tayfun Korkut. In November 2018, Cherundolo was named to the coaching staff of the United States national team by interim coach Dave Sarachan.

In an August 2020 interview with the Narrowing the Angle soccer podcast, Cherundolo said he "would love to coach" the US national team and also expressed interest in coaching in Major League Soccer. On August 20, 2020, it was announced that Cherundolo had joined the Germany national youth under-15 football team as an assistant coach.

On March 12, 2021, Cherundolo was named head coach of USL Championship side Las Vegas Lights.

Cherundolo was announced as head coach of Los Angeles FC in Major League Soccer on January 3, 2022. On October 2, 2022, Cherundolo broke the record for most wins as a first-year head coach in Major League Soccer history with 21 wins after Los Angeles FC defeated the Portland Timbers 2–1. The record was previously held by former Los Angeles FC coach Bob Bradley in 1998 with 20 wins, when Bradley was the head coach of the Chicago Fire. The match also clinched the Supporters' Shield for LAFC, the second in team history, and made Cherundolo the third coach to lead a team to the Shield in his first season in MLS. LAFC would go on to win their first MLS Cup title against the Philadelphia Union in MLS Cup 2022, with Cherundolo being the sixth coach to win Supporters' Shield and MLS Cup in the same season.

On April 18, 2025, LAFC announced that Cherundolo would step down as head coach at the end of the 2025 MLS season, citing family reasons.

On July 9, 2026, Cherundolo was announced as the head coach of the United States national under-23 team and will coach the team through the 2028 Summer Olympics.

On November 13, 2026, Cherundolo was announced as interim head coach of the senior United States national team after the sudden departure of incumbent head coach Mauricio Pochettino for English Premier League side Manchester United, starting from November 18.

== Personal life ==
Cherundolo speaks English and German fluently, having spent his entire professional career in Germany. A popular figure with Hannover fans, he is known as "Dolo" and affectionately nicknamed the "Mayor of Hannover". Cherundolo married Mandy Rosier on New Year's Eve 2009 at the local St. Joseph Catholic parish church in the Hanover district of Vahrenwald-List. After his retirement from soccer, he has resided with his family in Großburgwedel, near Hanover. In 2021, Cherundolo was elected to the National Soccer Hall of Fame as a player inductee.

== Career statistics ==
=== Club ===
Appearances and goals by club, season and competition
Club	Season	League			DFB-Pokal		Europe		Total	
Club	Season	Division	Apps	Goals	Apps	Goals	Apps	Goals	Apps	Goals
Hannover 96	1998–99	2. Bundesliga	8	0	0	0	—		8	0
Hannover 96	1999–2000	2. Bundesliga	12	0	1	0	—		13	0
Hannover 96	2000–01	2. Bundesliga	18	0	1	0	—		19	0
Hannover 96	2001–02	2. Bundesliga	30	1	2	0	—		32	1
Hannover 96	2002–03	Bundesliga	33	0	1	0	—		34	0
Hannover 96	2003–04	Bundesliga	29	0	2	0	—		31	0
Hannover 96	2004–05	Bundesliga	32	2	3	1	—		35	3
Hannover 96	2005–06	Bundesliga	22	1	1	0	—		23	1
Hannover 96	2006–07	Bundesliga	33	2	3	0	—		36	2
Hannover 96	2007–08	Bundesliga	33	0	2	0	—		35	0
Hannover 96	2008–09	Bundesliga	17	0	1	0	—		18	0
Hannover 96	2009–10	Bundesliga	26	1	1	0	—		27	1
Hannover 96	2010–11	Bundesliga	33	0	1	0	—		34	0
Hannover 96	2011–12	Bundesliga	22	0	2	0	11 (Note: Appearances in UEFA Europa League)	0	35	0
Hannover 96	2012–13	Bundesliga	20	0	3	0	10	0	33	0
Hannover 96	2013–14	Bundesliga	2	0	0	0	—		2	0
Career total			370	7	24	1	21	0	423	8

=== International ===
Appearances and goals by national team and year
National team	Year	Apps	Goals
United States	1999	1	0
United States	2000	0	0
United States	2001	8	0
United States	2002	1	0
United States	2003	5	0
United States	2004	6	0
United States	2005	10	0
United States	2006	7	1
United States	2007	5	1
United States	2008	8	0
United States	2009	6	0
United States	2010	8	0
United States	2011	13	0
United States	2012	9	0
Total		87	2

Scores and results list the United States' goal tally first, score column indicates score after each Cherundolo goal

List of international goals scored by Steve Cherundolo
No.	Date	Venue	Opponent	Score	Result	Competition
1	March 22, 2006	Westfalenstadion, Dortmund, Germany	Germany	1–4	1–4	Friendly
2	November 17, 2007	Coca-Cola Park, Johannesburg, South Africa	South Africa	1–0	1–0	Friendly

== Coaching statistics ==
As of 22 November 2025

Coaching record by club and tenure
Team	Nat	From	To	Record								Ref.
Team	Nat	From	To	G	W	D	L	GF	GA	GD	Win %	Ref.
Las Vegas Lights	(United States)	January 19, 2021	January 3, 2022	32	6	3	23	41	77	−36	18.75	
Los Angeles FC	(United States)	January 3, 2022	December 1, 2025	192	104	38	50	364	221	+143	54.17	
United States U23	(United States)	July 9, 2026	Present	0	0	0	0	0	0	+0	—	
Total				224	110	41	73	405	298	+107	49.11	

== Honors ==
=== Player ===
Hannover 96

- 2. Bundesliga: 2001–02

United States

- CONCACAF Gold Cup: 2005

=== Coach ===
Los Angeles FC

- MLS Cup: 2022
- Supporters' Shield: 2022
- U.S. Open Cup: 2024

== See also ==
- List of one-club men in association football
