= Bakary Soro =

Burkinabé professional footballer (born 1985)

Personal information
- Full name: Bakary Soro
- Date of birth: 5 December 1985 (age 40)
- Place of birth: Anyama, Abidjan, Ivory Coast
- Height: 1.84 m (6 ft 0 in)
- Position: Centre back

Youth career
- Académie de Sol Beni

Senior career*
Years	Team	Apps	(Gls)
2003–2006	ASEC Mimosas		
2006–2007	Charlton Athletic	0	(0)
2007–2008	→ Germinal Beerschot (loan)	5	(0)
2008–2009	Lorient	11	(0)
2009–2013	Arles	107	(2)
2013–2014	Orduspor	32	(2)
2014–2016	Osmanlıspor	37	(2)
2016	→ Alanyaspor (loan)	2	(0)
2017	Şanlıurfaspor	9	(0)

International career
2005	Ivory Coast U20	3	(0)
2010	Burkina Faso	1	(0)
- * Club domestic league appearances and goals as of 24 April 2018

Bakary Soro (born 5 December 1985) is a Burkinabé professional footballer who recently played as a defender for Şanlıurfaspor. He has represented the Ivory Coast at under-20 level and Burkina Faso in an exhibition game.

== Career ==
Soro was raised in Anyama, the same Abidjan suburb as Ivorian internationals Arouna and Bakari Koné, and in similar fashion to the latter, began his career at homeland club ASEC Mimosas, coming through their famed Académie de Sol Beni youth academy, run by Jean-Marc Guillou, before moving on to the ASEC first team.

Soro's success did not go unnoticed, as he was called up to the Ivorian senior side for the 2008 African Cup of Nations qualifier against Gabon on 5 October 2006, along with fellow ASEC player Didier Ya Konan. The team won 5–0, although Soro was an unused substitute.

In November 2006, it was reported that Soro and Ya Konan had been granted trials with English Premier League club Charlton Athletic, with the London-based side eventually signing him.

In January 2007, Soro signed a loan deal with Belgian Pro League club Germinal Beerschot, going on to make four appearances. In August 2007, Soro moved to French Ligue 1 side Lorient, establishing himself in the first team for the 2008–09 season.

Soro left Lorient in September 2009 to join Arles on a free transfer in December 2009.

== International career ==
Soro represented the Ivory Coast at the 2005 African Youth Championship and was named captain during the tournament. He played in games against Mali, Benin and Nigeria as Ivory Coast were eliminated at the group stage.

Soro later switched international allegiance to Burkina Faso and participated in an exhibition game in Cannes against Gabon on 6 September 2010. He came on as a second-half substitute, making his debut under controversial Portuguese coach Paulo Duarte; Duarte gave international debuts to several non-Burkinabé players during his time as Burkina Faso head coach.

In 2012, it was announced that Burkina Faso had named Soro in their provisional squad for the 2013 Africa Cup of Nations.
