= Konstantin Rausch =

Russian-German footballer (born 1990)

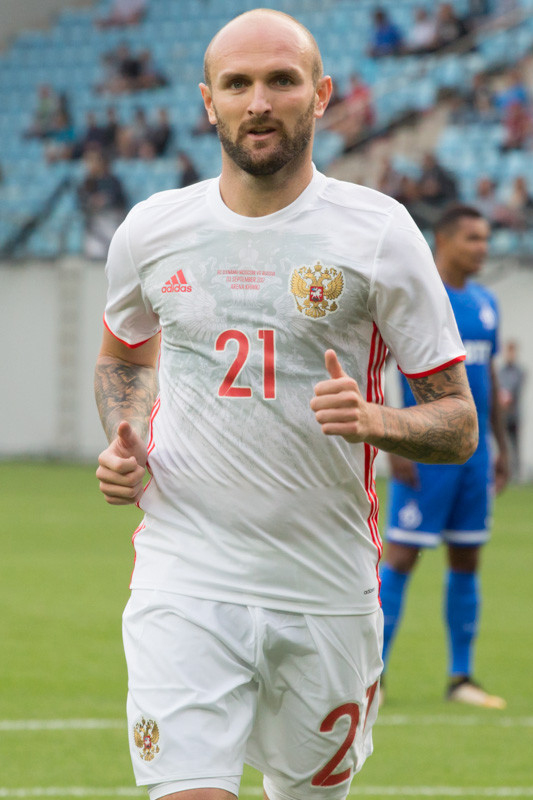
- Rausch playing for Russia in 2017

Personal information
- Full name: Konstantin Viktorovich Rausch
- Date of birth: 15 March 1990 (age 36)
- Place of birth: Kozhevnikovo, Tomsk Oblast, Soviet Union
- Height: 1.81 m (5 ft 11 in)
- Positions: Left-back; left midfielder

Youth career
- 1996–2002: TuS Lachendorf
- 2002–2004: SV Nienhagen
- 2004–2008: Hannover 96

Senior career*
Years	Team	Apps	(Gls)
2008–2009	Hannover 96 II	15	(0)
2008–2013	Hannover 96	150	(9)
2013–2015	VfB Stuttgart	25	(2)
2015	VfB Stuttgart II	9	(2)
2015–2016	Darmstadt 98	31	(2)
2016–2018	1. FC Köln	40	(0)
2018–2020	Dynamo Moscow	48	(2)
2021–2022	1. FC Nürnberg	4	(0)
2021	1. FC Nürnberg II	1	(0)
Total		323	(17)

International career
2005–2006	Germany U16	5	(0)
2006–2007	Germany U17	24	(0)
2007–2008	Germany U18	4	(0)
2008–2009	Germany U19	10	(0)
2010–2011	Germany U21	8	(1)
2017–2018	Russia	9	(0)
- * Club domestic league appearances and goals

Konstantin Viktorovich Rausch (Russian: Константин Викторович Рауш, German: Konstantin Rausch; born 15 March 1990) is a former professional footballer who played as a left-back. Born in Germany, he represented the country at various youth levels before switching allegiance to the Russia senior national team.

== Early life ==
Rausch was born in Kozhevnikovo, Tomsk Oblast, Russian SFSR to ethnic German parents. His family emigrated to Germany from Russia in 1996. His first friend in Germany could not pronounce "Konstantin" and instead called him "Kocka", a nickname still used by his teammates and coaches. Rausch is dual citizen of Russia and Germany.

== Club career ==
=== Early career ===
Shortly after moving to Germany, Rausch started playing football at the local club, TuS Lachendorf. At the age of twelve he received an offer to join the youth team of Bundesliga side Hannover 96. He decided he was not mature enough for such a big club and instead joined another local side, SV Nienhagen. He finally joined Hannover two years later, rejecting offers from Werder Bremen and Feyenoord.

=== Hannover 96 ===
When 96 first choice left full back Michael Tarnat and his replacement Christian Schulz were injured, Rausch debuted against VfB Stuttgart on 30 March 2008. He was aged 18, which made him the youngest player ever, to appear in Hannover's first squad. Rausch had a good game, but had to be substituted at half time after straining a muscle. Two days later, he signed his first professional contract, running until 2010. While Hannover favoured a longer contract, Rausch did not want to tie himself for too long.

=== VfB Stuttgart ===
After the end of his contract with Hannover on 1 July 2013, Rausch moved to VfB Stuttgart on a free transfer. On 5 May 2013, Konstantin Rausch signed a contract until June 2016 with VfB Stuttgart.

=== Darmstadt 98 ===
On 6 July 2015, Rausch signed a one-year contract with SV Darmstadt 98.

=== Dynamo Moscow ===
On 21 January 2018, he signed with Russian club FC Dynamo Moscow. On 19 December 2020, Dynamo announced that he left the club as his contract expired.

=== 1. FC Nürnberg and retirement ===
In summer 2022, after a season with 1. FC Nürnberg, Rausch retired from professional football.

== International career ==
=== International youth teams ===
Rausch played for various German youth teams as a left full back or wing back, accumulating more than 30 appearances. His biggest success was a bronze medal at the 2007 FIFA U-17 World Cup, where he started in every game except for one, which he missed following a red card. After the tournament, he was awarded a Fritz Walter Medal in silver as the second most promising German football player of his age.

=== Senior team ===
In March 2011, Russian media quoted Rausch to be interested in playing for the Russia national team, but that the Russian Football Union never approached him. On 16 August 2017, he was called up for Russia for a friendly game against a club side Dynamo Moscow, which did not count as a full international match. He made his full international debut on 7 October 2017 in a friendly game against South Korea.

On 11 May 2018, he was included in Russia's extended 2018 FIFA World Cup squad. He was not included in the finalized World Cup squad due to back injury.

== Career statistics ==
=== Club ===
Appearances and goals by club, season and competition
Club	Season	League			Cup		Continental		Total	
Club	Season	Division	Apps	Goals	Apps	Goals	Apps	Goals	Apps	Goals
Hannover 96	2007–08	Bundesliga	2	0	0	0	–		2	0
Hannover 96	2008–09	Bundesliga	25	0	1	0	–		26	0
Hannover 96	2009–10	Bundesliga	26	0	1	0	–		27	0
Hannover 96	2010–11	Bundesliga	34	5	0	0	–		34	5
Hannover 96	2011–12	Bundesliga	33	1	2	0	14	1	49	2
Hannover 96	2012–13	Bundesliga	30	3	2	1	10	0	42	4
Hannover 96	Total		150	9	6	1	24	1	180	11
Hannover 96 II	2007–08	Oberliga Nord	11	0	–		–		11	0
Hannover 96 II	2008–09	Regionalliga Nord	4	0	–		–		4	0
Hannover 96 II	Total		15	0	0	0	0	0	15	0
VfB Stuttgart	2013–14	Bundesliga	21	2	1	0	1	0	23	2
VfB Stuttgart	2014–15	Bundesliga	4	0	0	0	–		4	0
VfB Stuttgart	Total		25	2	1	0	1	0	27	2
VfB Stuttgart II	2014–15	3. Liga	9	2	–		–		9	2
Darmstadt 98	2015–16	Bundesliga	31	2	2	1	–		33	3
1. FC Köln	2016–17	Bundesliga	28	0	3	1	–		31	1
1. FC Köln	2017–18	Bundesliga	12	0	1	0	6	0	19	0
1. FC Köln	Total		40	0	4	1	6	0	50	1
Dynamo Moscow	2017–18	Russian Premier League	10	0	0	0	–		10	0
Dynamo Moscow	2018–19	Russian Premier League	16	0	0	0	–		16	0
Dynamo Moscow	2019–20	Russian Premier League	18	1	0	0	–		18	1
Dynamo Moscow	2020–21	Russian Premier League	4	1	–		0	0	4	1
Dynamo Moscow	Total		48	2	0	0	0	0	48	2
1. FC Nürnberg	2021–22	2. Bundesliga	4	0	0	0	–		4	0
1. FC Nürnberg II	2021–22	Regionalliga Bayern	1	0	–		–		1	0
Career total			323	17	13	3	31	1	367	21

=== International ===
Appearances and goals by national team and year
National team	Year	Apps	Goals
Russia	2017	4	0
Total		4	0

== Honours ==
Germany U17

- FIFA U-17 World Cup: third place 2007

Individual

- Fritz Walter Medal: 2007 in Silver (Category U17)
- Fritz Walter Medal: 2009 in Silver (Category U19)
