= Markus Miller =

German footballer

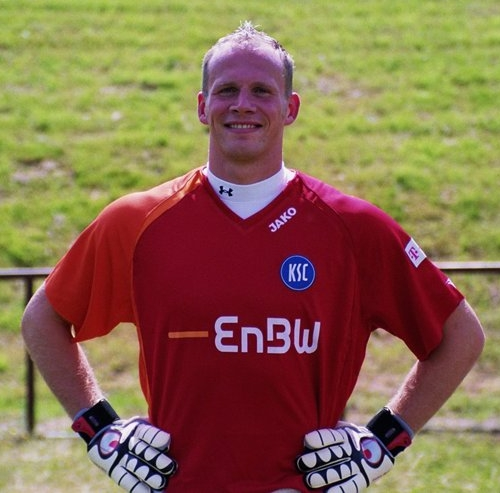
- Miller with Karlsruher SC in 2007

Personal information
- Date of birth: 8 April 1982 (age 44)
- Place of birth: Lindenberg im Allgäu, West Germany
- Height: 1.89 m (6 ft 2 in)
- Position: Goalkeeper

Youth career
- FC Lindenberg
- FC Wangen

Senior career*
Years	Team	Apps	(Gls)
2000–2002	VfB Stuttgart II	44	(0)
2002–2003	FC Augsburg	18	(0)
2003–2010	Karlsruher SC	183	(0)
2009	Karlsruher SC II	1	(0)
2010–2015	Hannover 96	0	(0)
2011–2013	Hannover 96 II	10	(0)
Total		270	(0)
- * Club domestic league appearances and goals

Markus Miller (born 8 April 1982) is a German former professional footballer who played as a goalkeeper.

== Career ==
Born in Lindenberg im Allgäu, Miller started to play football at local amateur side FC Lindenberg and moved later to FC Wangen, another regional amateur side.

In 2000, Miller moved to Bundesliga side VfB Stuttgart, although he generally played for their reserve squad in the third-division Regionalliga Süd, where he made a total of 44 appearances for the team over the following two seasons. He only occasionally sat on the bench for Stuttgart's professional squad in the Bundesliga, making no first-division appearances throughout the two seasons with the club. He went on to make a move to then Regionalliga Süd side FC Augsburg for the 2002–03 season, subsequently making a total of 18 league appearances throughout the season.

In the summer of 2003, Miller made a move to 2. Bundesliga side Karlsruher SC, but failed to make a single first-team appearance in his first season with the club. However, he became the club's first-choice goalkeeper for the 2004–05 season and made his professional debut on 7 August 2004 in KSC's 1–1 home draw to Wacker Burghausen in the 2. Bundesliga. He went on to make 30 appearances in the league that season, and the following season, he played in all 34 2. Bundesliga matches for KSC.

Miller continued to be KSC's first-choice goalkeeper in the 2006–07 season of the 2. Bundesliga, missing only four matches. On 9 October 2006, he extended his contract with KSC until 30 June 2009.

Miller is often compared to KSC's goalkeeping legend Oliver Kahn, who played for the club from his childhood until the 1994 transfer to Bayern Munich, but does not feel comfortable with the comparison. The fans nicknamed him Killer Miller after a sensational DFB-Pokal performance against Mainz 05 on 21 September 2004, when he saved all three penalty attempts from the Mainz side during the penalty shootout. Another of his high-quality performances for KSC came on 16 October 2006 in away derby at 1. FC Köln in the 2. Bundesliga, where he amazingly saved several close-range shots in the second half and helped KSC to drive home one point as the match ended in a 1–1 draw.

On 6 November 2006, Miller was voted best goalkeeper in the whole Bundesliga system by users of the official Bundesliga website.

On 24 October 2008, Miller extended his contract with KSC for another year until 30 June 2010. On 6 May 2010, he confirmed that would leave Karlsruher SC after seven years at end of the season, and on 2 June 2010, he signed a two-year contract for Hannover 96.

== Career statistics ==
Appearances and goals by club, season and competition
Club	Season	League			National cup		League cup		Continental		Total	
Club	Season	Division	Apps	Goals	Apps	Goals	Apps	Goals	Apps	Goals	Apps	Goals
VfB Stuttgart II	2000–01	Regionalliga Süd	15	0	0	0	—		—		15	0
VfB Stuttgart II	2001–02	Regionalliga Süd	29	0	1	0	—		—		30	0
VfB Stuttgart II	Total		44	0	1	0	—		—		45	0
FC Augsburg	2002–03	Regionalliga Süd	18	0	—		—		—		18	0
Karlsruher SC	2003–04	2. Bundesliga	0	0	0	0	—		—		0	0
Karlsruher SC	2004–05	2. Bundesliga	30	0	2	0	—		—		32	0
Karlsruher SC	2005–06	2. Bundesliga	34	0	2	0	—		—		36	0
Karlsruher SC	2006–07	2. Bundesliga	30	0	2	0	—		—		32	0
Karlsruher SC	2007–08	Bundesliga	28	0	1	0	1	0	—		30	0
Karlsruher SC	2008–09	Bundesliga	33	0	3	0	—		—		36	0
Karlsruher SC	2009–10	2. Bundesliga	28	0	1	0	—		—		29	0
Karlsruher SC	Total		183	0	11	0	1	0	—		195	0
Karlsruher SC II	2009–10	Regionalliga Süd	1	0	—		—		—		1	0
Hannover 96 II	2010–11	Regionalliga Nord	7	0	—		—		—		7	0
Hannover 96 II	2011–12	Regionalliga Nord	1	0	—		—		—		1	0
Hannover 96 II	2012–13	Regionalliga Nord	0	0	—		—		—		0	0
Hannover 96 II	2013–14	Regionalliga Nord	2	0	—		—		—		2	0
Hannover 96 II	Total		10	0	—		—		—		10	0
Hannover 96	2010–11	Bundesliga	0	0	0	0	—		—		0	0
Hannover 96	2011–12	Bundesliga	0	0	0	0	—		1	0	1	0
Hannover 96	2012–13	Bundesliga	0	0	0	0	—		0	0	0	0
Hannover 96	2013–14	Bundesliga	0	0	0	0	—		—		0	0
Hannover 96	2014–15	Bundesliga	0	0	0	0	—		—		0	0
Hannover 96	Total		0	0	0	0	—		1	0	1	0
Career total			256	0	12	0	1	0	1	0	270	8

== Honours ==
VfB Stuttgart

- UEFA Intertoto Cup: 2000
