= Mame Biram Diouf =

Senegalese footballer (born 1987)

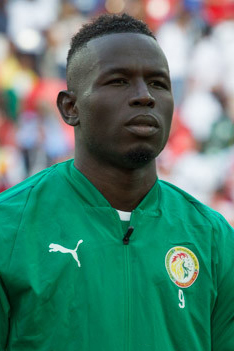
- Diouf lining up for Senegal at the 2018 FIFA World Cup

Personal information
- Full name: Mame Biram Diouf
- Date of birth: 16 December 1987 (age 38)
- Place of birth: Dakar, Senegal
- Height: 1.85 m (6 ft 1 in)
- Position: Striker

Team information
- Current team: Ankara Keçiörengücü
- Number: 55

Senior career*
Years	Team	Apps	(Gls)
2006–2007	Diaraf		
2007–2009	Molde	62	(29)
2009–2012	Manchester United	5	(1)
2009	→ Molde (loan)	12	(4)
2010–2011	→ Blackburn Rovers (loan)	26	(3)
2012–2014	Hannover 96	57	(26)
2014–2020	Stoke City	144	(24)
2020–2022	Hatayspor	73	(31)
2022–2023	Konyaspor	28	(9)
2023–2024	Göztepe	13	(2)
2024–	Ankara Keçiörengücü	58	(31)

International career^{‡}
2009–2018	Senegal	47	(10)
- * Club domestic league appearances and goals as of 26 April 2026 ‡ National team caps and goals as of 28 June 2018

Mame Biram Diouf (born 16 December 1987) is a Senegalese professional footballer who plays as a striker for Turkish TFF First League club Ankara Keçiörengücü.

Diouf started his career at Diaraf before moving to Molde in 2007. In his first season with them he won the Norwegian First Division, and gained promotion to the Norwegian top division. His performances and goalscoring attracted interest from a number of big clubs, and he eventually moved to Manchester United in 2009, remaining on loan at Molde until January 2010. He scored on his home debut for United and won the League Cup as an unused substitute in the 2010 final. Diouf joined Hannover in January 2012, where he scored 35 goals in 71 appearances, before moving to Stoke City on a free transfer in 2014. Diouf spent six seasons with Stoke scoring 25 goals in 157 appearances before leaving in the summer of 2020.

Diouf made his Senegal debut in 2009 in a 2–1 friendly win over the DR Congo; he has represented the country at the 2015 and 2017 Africa Cup of Nations, as well as at the 2018 FIFA World Cup.

== Club career ==
=== Molde ===
Born in Dakar, Senegal, Diouf began his career with Diaraf. In January 2007, he joined Norwegian club Molde, having trained with them in March 2006. He expressed his happiness at joining fellow countrymen Pape Paté Diouf (still playing for a contract with Molde at that time) and Madiou Konate at the club. Molde also agreed with Diaraf all considitions concerning the transfer, if Diouf signed a professional contract with Molde.

In his second season at Molde, and the first in Tippeligaen, Diouf did well and scored a total of five goals against Brann in the two matches of the 2008 season, two goals in a 4–3 victory in the Tippeliga match in Bergen on 31 May and three goals in the 8–0 victory in the Cup on 23 July. These goals lead to some rumours in the Bergen-papers, that Brann would be interested in signing Diouf. He was also linked to Arsenal, Feyenoord, Groningen, West Bromwich Albion and Red Bull Salzburg.

In the 2009 season, he scored 16 goals in 29 matches. Even with his strong performance, Molde only finished second in the league and the cup. A highlight of the season was the 5–2 win against Brann on 12 July 2009, where Diouf scored a hat-trick in the first nine minutes of the game, and added the fourth goal in the 27th minute.

=== Manchester United ===
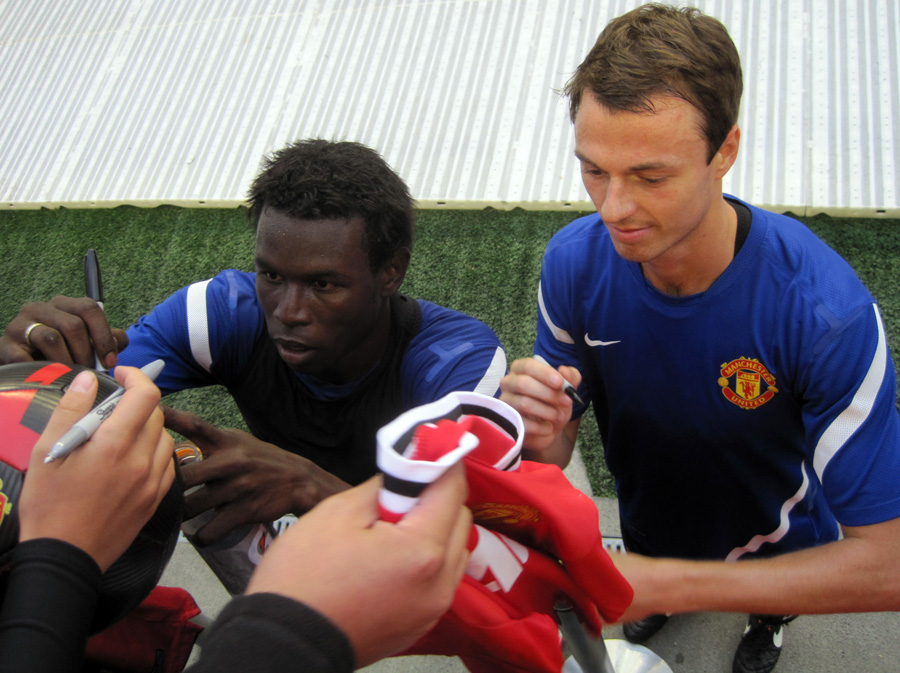
Diouf (left) and Jonny Evans signing autographs for Manchester United supporters in 2011

In May 2009, he received interest from several senior clubs and on 17 July 2009, Molde and Manchester United announced that a transfer had been agreed for the player. Diouf was loaned back to Molde for the remainder of the Norwegian 2009 season, before joining his new teammates in Manchester in January 2010. "We signed a young player yesterday from Norway, who we've been looking at for two years," United manager Alex Ferguson said. "We weren't intending on signing anyone else after last week – we feel we have a full squad – but the situation accelerated to a point where other clubs started to make bids, so we had to decide whether we acted or didn't act. We decided to act and he'll be the last person we sign."

On 23 December 2009, Diouf was granted a work permit making him available to play for Manchester United once the transfer window opened in January. After becoming eligible to play for Manchester United on 7 January 2010, Diouf was registered with the number 32 shirt worn previously by Carlos Tevez, and made his debut in a league match away to Birmingham City two days later; with the scores level at 1–1, Diouf came off the bench for Paul Scholes in the 81st minute, but he was unable to help break the deadlock and the match finished as a draw.

Diouf made his home debut for United in a 3–0 win over Burnley on 16 January 2010, coming on as a 74th-minute substitute for Wayne Rooney. In stoppage time at the end of the game, Diouf scored his first goal for United; after being played in by Antonio Valencia, he looped a header over Burnley goalkeeper Brian Jensen and celebrated with a flip in front of the Stretford End before pointing to the name on the back of his shirt.

==== Loan to Blackburn Rovers ====
On 6 August 2010, Diouf signed for Blackburn Rovers on a season-long loan and was handed the number 41 shirt. Diouf made an immediate impact for Blackburn, scoring within 15 minutes after coming on as a substitute for Nick Blackman in a 1–1 pre-season friendly draw against Hearts.

On 24 August 2010, Diouf scored his first goals for Blackburn on his full debut as he netted a hat-trick in a 3–1 home League Cup victory over Norwich City, playing the full 90 minutes at Ewood Park. He then scored his first league goal for Rovers four days later, netting their only goal in a 2–1 home loss to Arsenal on his first ever Premier League start; the assist came from his fellow Senegalese namesake El Hadji Diouf. By the end of his loan at Blackburn, he had made 29 appearances and scored six goals in all competitions.

==== Return to Manchester United ====
Diouf returned to United in the summer of 2011, and he was included in the squad for their pre season tour of America. He came on for Michael Carrick in the second half of their first game, a 4–1 win over the New England Revolution. In the second game against Seattle Sounders FC, he came on at half time for Michael Owen and scored in the 49th minute, making it 2–0. The match finished 7–0 to Manchester United. On 5 August 2011, he scored twice in Paul Scholes's testimonial match against the New York Cosmos at Old Trafford. Diouf played in two League Cup matches away to Leeds United and away to Aldershot Town. In both matches, he played on the wing.

=== Hannover 96 ===
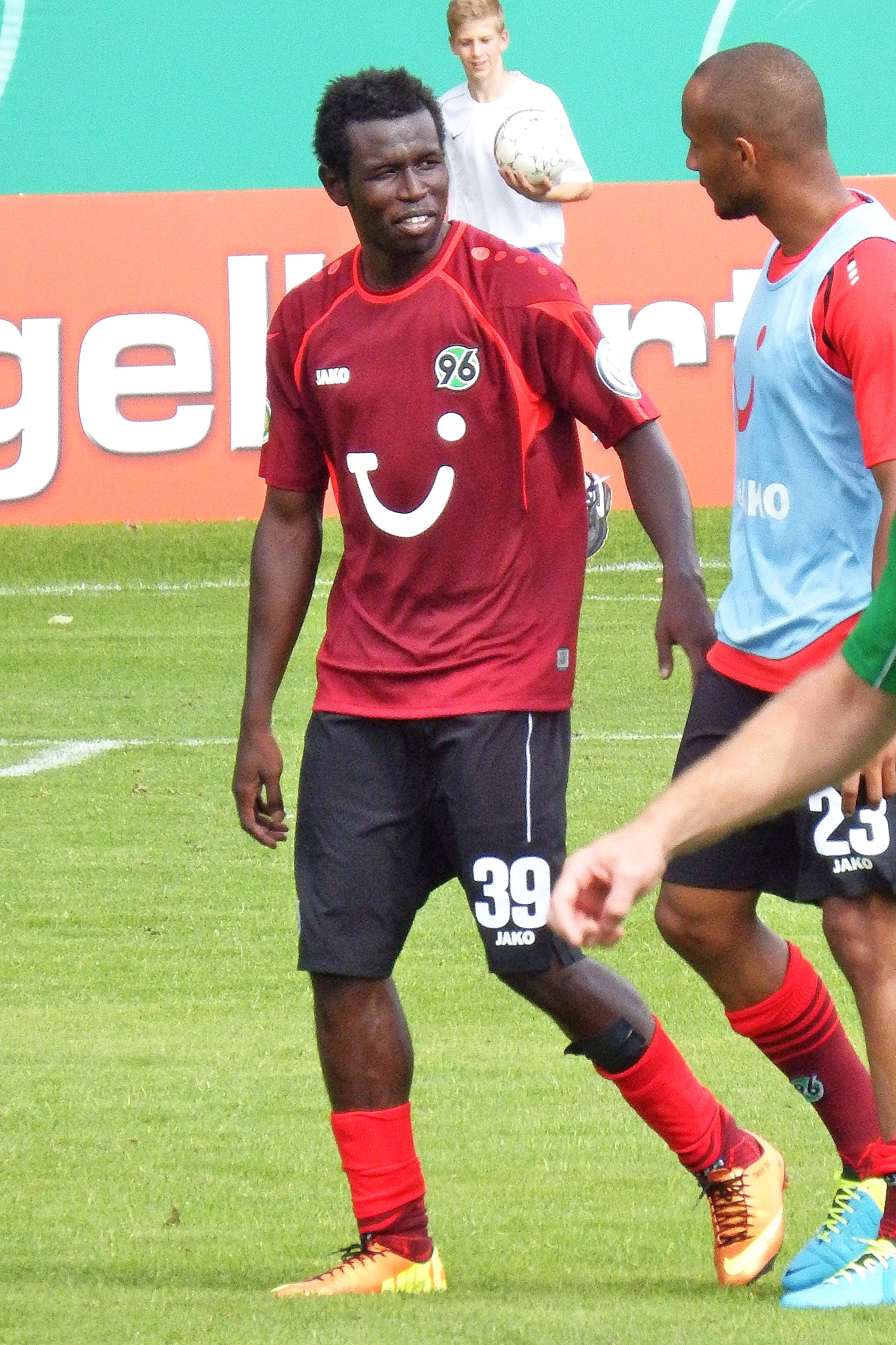
Diouf playing for Hannover 96 in 2013

During the January 2012 transfer window, Diouf claimed that Wigan Athletic wanted to sign him on loan so he could get more playing time. Also interested in signing Diouf was Hannover 96. Eventually, on 28 January 2012, Diouf signed for German club Hannover 96 on a two-year contract for an undisclosed fee. Diouf scored his first goal in the 32nd minute in the match against VfB Stuttgart which Hannover won 4–2. He scored the only goal against Club Brugge on 23 February 2012 when Hannover advanced to the round of 16 of the 2011–12 UEFA Europa League. Diouf scored six goals in six games, with a second-half brace in a 4–1 victory over 1. FC Köln on 18 March 2012. In total Diouf played 15 times for Hannover in 2011–12 scoring ten goals including both goals against Atlético Madrid in the quarter-final of the Europa League, although Hannover lost 4–2 on aggregate.

In the 2012–13 season Diouf finished as top-scorer for Hannover with 17 goals from 36 matches as they finished in 9th position. In the summer of 2013, Stoke City tried to sign Diouf but were unable to agree a transfer fee with Hannover. In 2013–14, Diouf scored 8 goals in 20 appearances as Hannover finished in 10th position. At the end of the campaign Diouf left Hannover after his contract expired.

=== Stoke City ===
On 11 June 2014, Diouf signed a four-year contract with Stoke City beginning on 1 July 2014 on a free transfer. Upon signing for Stoke, Diouf stated that he felt better prepared for the Premier League following his spell in Germany. He made his Stoke City debut on 16 August 2014 in a 1–0 defeat against Aston Villa. Diouf scored his first goal for Stoke on 30 August 2014 against Manchester City, where he ran 70 yards before slotting past Joe Hart to earn Stoke a 1–0 victory at the Etihad Stadium. On 28 December 2014, Diouf scored both goals in a 2–0 win over Midlands rivals West Bromwich Albion. In his first season at Stoke, Diouf has been played out of position at right wing by manager Mark Hughes. He scored in wins against Aston Villa, Everton and Southampton. Diouf played 38 times for Stoke in 2014–15 as the Potters finished in 9th position for a second season running and they ended the campaign with a 6–1 victory against Liverpool with Diouf scoring twice to end the season as top scorer with 12.

Diouf began the 2015–16 season well scoring in draws against Tottenham Hotspur and Norwich City in August and the winning goal against AFC Bournemouth, in September to secure Stoke's first win of the campaign. However, following the death of his mother in September 2015, Diouf lost his form and consequently lost his place as centre forward with Mark Hughes instead using him in a winger role. Diouf even had to fill in a right-back against Bournemouth in February 2016, following injuries to Phil Bardsley and Glen Johnson. He scored a late equalizer against Chelsea on 5 March 2016, earning Stoke their first Premier League point at Stamford Bridge. Diouf ended the season by scoring the winning goal against West Ham United, which secured Stoke 9th position. Diouf dedicated his goal to his mother. In 2016–17 Diouf played in 28 matches, scoring once against Bournemouth on 6 May 2017 as Stoke finished in 13th position. Throughout the campaign Diouf again played out of position including as a right-wing back.

Diouf signed a new three-year contract with Stoke on 14 September 2017. Diouf was a regular in 2017–18, making 37 appearances, scoring six goals as Stoke suffered relegation to the Championship. He came in for heavy criticism from supporters during the campaign for his poor finishing. Diouf made 16 appearances in 2018–19 of which only seven were starts and speaking in February 2019 Diouf admitted he would probably have to leave. He was initially not allocated a squad number for the 2019–20 season by Nathan Jones but was restored by new manager Michael O'Neill in November and subsequently scored the winning goal in a 2–1 victory against Wigan Athletic. Diouf remained on the fringes of the squad in 2019–20 and when the season was extended into the summer due to the COVID-19 pandemic, Diouf signed a contract extension to cover the remaining matches. With Stoke securing their Championship safety in the penultimate game of the season, Diouf asked to be released early from his contract on 20 July 2020 after spending six years with the club.

=== Later career ===
On 31 August 2020, Diouf signed with the newly promoted Turkish Süper Lig club Hatayspor. Diouf spent two-seasons with Hatayspor, scoring 31 goals in 75 appearances. On 31 August 2022, Diouf joined Konyaspor on a one-year contract.

== International career ==
On 12 August 2009, Diouf won his first cap for Senegal in a 2–1 friendly win over the DR Congo in Blois, France. He scored his first goal for Senegal in a 1–0 victory over Cape Verde on 11 August 2010.

On 15 November 2014, Diouf scored in a 1–0 win against Egypt which saw Senegal qualify of the 2015 Africa Cup of Nations. At the tournament finals, Diouf scored Senegal's equalising goal as they defeated Ghana 2–1 in the team's opening match.

In May 2018, he was named in Senegal's 23-man squad for the 2018 FIFA World Cup in Russia.

== Personal life ==
Diouf married his girlfriend of four years, Maria Orten, in Molde on 2 July 2011. Diouf went missing for a few days before the wedding, with his fiancée blaming his disappearance on the best man, Molde FK midfielder Pape Paté Diouf. He eventually turned up on 30 June, but Orten was forbidden from revealing the reason for his absence. His brother Mame Mbar Diouf is also a footballer who has played for Molde, Sarpsborg 08 and TSG Neustrelitz. Diouf's mother, Gnilane, died during the 2015 Mina disaster in Saudi Arabia, while his sister survived with small injuries.

== Career statistics ==
=== Club ===
As of match played 24 December 2023

Appearances and goals by club, season and competition
Club	Season	League			National cup		League cup		Other		Total	
Club	Season	Division	Apps	Goals	Apps	Goals	Apps	Goals	Apps	Goals	Apps	Goals
Molde	2007	1. divisjon	22	10	0	0	—		—		22	10
Molde	2008	Tippeligaen	23	7	5	4	—		—		28	11
Molde	2009	Tippeligaen	29	16	7	8	—		—		36	24
Molde	Total		74	33	12	12	—		—		86	45
Manchester United	2009–10	Premier League	5	1	0	0	1	0	0	0	6	1
Manchester United	2010–11	Premier League	0	0	0	0	0	0	0	0	0	0
Manchester United	2011–12	Premier League	0	0	0	0	3	0	0	0	3	0
Manchester United	Total		5	1	0	0	4	0	0	0	9	1
Blackburn Rovers (loan)	2010–11	Premier League	26	3	1	0	2	3	—		29	6
Hannover 96	2011–12	Bundesliga	10	6	0	0	—		5 (Note: Appearances in UEFA Europa League)	4	15	10
Hannover 96	2012–13	Bundesliga	28	12	2	2	—		6	3	36	17
Hannover 96	2013–14	Bundesliga	19	8	1	0	—		0	0	20	8
Hannover 96	Total		57	26	3	2	—		11	7	71	35
Stoke City	2014–15	Premier League	34	11	2	0	2	1	—		38	12
Stoke City	2015–16	Premier League	26	5	2	0	2	0	—		30	5
Stoke City	2016–17	Premier League	27	1	0	0	1	0	—		28	1
Stoke City	2017–18	Premier League	35	6	1	0	1	0	—		37	6
Stoke City	2018–19	Championship	14	0	1	0	1	0	—		16	0
Stoke City	2019–20	Championship	8	1	0	0	0	0	—		8	1
Stoke City	Total		144	24	6	0	7	1	—		157	25
Stoke City U23	2016–17	—	—		—		—		1 (Note: Appearance in EFL Trophy)	0	1	0
Hatayspor	2020–21	Süper Lig	38	19	0	0	—		—		38	19
Hatayspor	2021–22	Süper Lig	35	12	2	0	—		—		37	12
Hatayspor	Total		73	31	2	0	—		—		75	31
Konyaspor	2022–23	Süper Lig	28	9	1	1	—		—		29	10
Göztepe	2023–24	TFF First League	13	2	0	0	—		—		13	2
Career total			420	129	23	15	15	4	12	7	470	155

=== International ===
As of match played 24 June 2018

Appearances and goals by national team and year
National team	Year	Apps	Goals
Senegal
Senegal	2009	3	0
Senegal	2010	5	1
Senegal	2011	5	1
Senegal	2012	1	0
Senegal	2013	4	0
Senegal	2014	4	2
Senegal	2015	7	4
Senegal	2016	6	2
Senegal	2017	6	0
Senegal	2018	6	0
Total		47	10

As of match played 24 June 2018. Senegal score listed first, score column indicates score after each Diouf goal.

List of international goals scored by Mame Biram Diouf
No.	Date	Venue	Cap	Opponent	Score	Result	Competition
1	11 August 2010	Stade Léopold Sédar Senghor, Dakar, Senegal	7	Cape Verde	1–0	1–0	Friendly
2	11 November 2011	Stade Aimé Bergeal, Mantes-la-Ville, France	14	Guinea	4–0	4–1	Friendly
3	5 September 2014	Stade Léopold Sédar Senghor, Dakar, Senegal	22	Egypt	1–0	2–0	2015 Africa Cup of Nations qualification
4	15 November 2014	Cairo International Stadium, Cairo, Egypt	24	Egypt	1–0	1–0	2015 Africa Cup of Nations qualification
5	19 January 2015	Estadio de Mongomo, Mongomo, Equatorial Guinea	27	Ghana	1–1	2–1	2015 Africa Cup of Nations
6	13 June 2015	Stade Léopold Sédar Senghor, Dakar, Senegal	31	Burkina Faso	2–1	3–1	2017 Africa Cup of Nations qualification
7	13 November 2015	Mahamasina Municipal Stadium, Antananarivo, Madagascar	32	Madagascar	1–2	2–2	2018 FIFA World Cup qualification
8	17 November 2015	Stade Léopold Sédar Senghor, Dakar, Senegal	33	Madagascar	3–0	3–0	2018 FIFA World Cup qualification
9	28 May 2016	Amahoro Stadium, Kigali, Rwanda	36	Rwanda	1–0	2–0	Friendly
10	4 June 2016	Prince Louis Rwagasore Stadium, Bujumbura, Burundi	37	Burundi	2–0	2–0	2017 Africa Cup of Nations qualification

== Honours ==
Manchester United

- Football League Cup: 2009–10
