= Manuel Schmiedebach =

German footballer

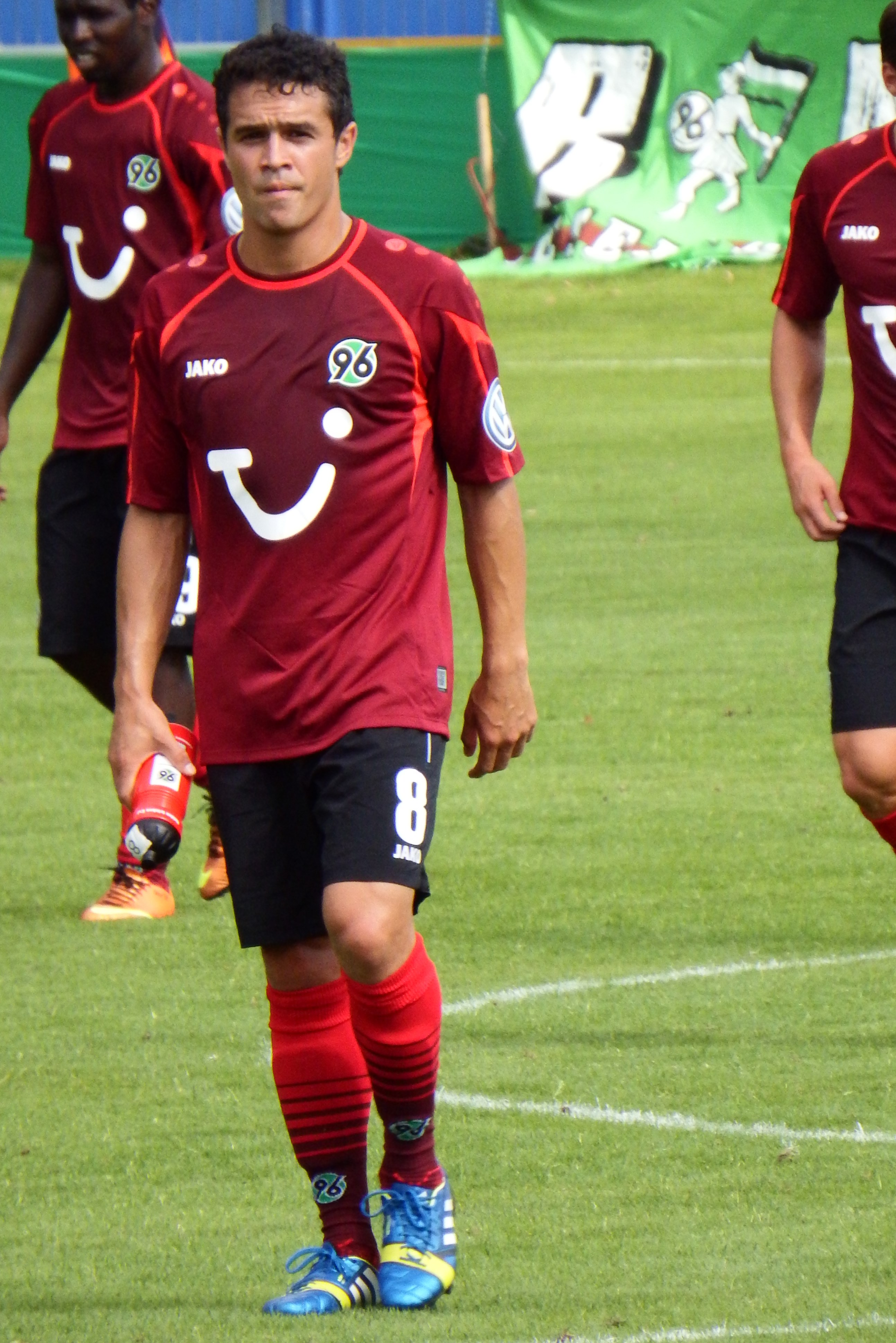
- Schmiedebach with Hannover 96 in 2013

Personal information
- Date of birth: 5 December 1988 (age 37)
- Place of birth: West Berlin, West Germany
- Height: 1.70 m (5 ft 7 in)
- Position: Defensive midfielder

Team information
- Current team: Grün-Weiß Ahrensfelde
- Number: 16

Youth career
- –2003: Nordberliner SC
- 2003–2006: Hertha BSC

Senior career*
Years	Team	Apps	(Gls)
2006–2008	Hertha BSC II	36	(6)
2008–2013	Hannover 96 II	46	(10)
2009–2019	Hannover 96	202	(2)
2018–2019	→ Union Berlin (loan)	32	(0)
2019–2020	Union Berlin	5	(0)
2021–	Grün-Weiß Ahrensfelde	45	(5)

International career
2006–2007	Germany U19	10	(1)
- * Club domestic league appearances and goals as of 15:38, 11 June 2023 (UTC)

Manuel Schmiedebach (born 5 December 1988) is a German professional footballer who plays for German side Grün-Weiß Ahrensfelde.

== Career ==
Born in West Berlin, Schmiedebach was first a product of hometown club Hertha BSC's youth teams.

In 2008 he joined the amateur team of Hannover 96 II in the Regionalliga Nord on a free transfer. The next season, he debuted under manager Dieter Hecking on 8 August 2009 against his former club form Hertha BSC in the Bundesliga. In a difficult season due to the suicide of the team's goalkeeper and captain Robert Enke he managed to become one of the most important players in Hannover's midfield. In May 2010 he decided to extend his contract with Hannover 96 up to 2012.

== Personal life ==
Schmiedebach grew up bilingual, speaking German and Spanish. His mother Betty is a Colombian-born Venezuelan of Moroccan-Portuguese descent, she came to Berlin over two decades ago. His father Helmuth has Irish roots.

== Career statistics ==
As of 7 August 2020

Appearances and goals by club, season and competition
Club	Season	League			Cup		Continental		Other		Total		Ref.
Club	Season	League	Apps	Goals	Apps	Goals	Apps	Goals	Apps	Goals	Apps	Goals	Ref.
Hertha BSC II	2006–07	Regionalliga Nord	20	0	—		—		—		20	0	
Hertha BSC II	2007–08	NOFV-Oberliga Nord	16	6	—		—		—		16	6	
Hertha BSC II	Total		36	6	0	0	0	0	0	0	36	6	—
Hannover II	2008–09	Regionalliga Nord	30	5	—		—		—		30	5	
Hannover II	2009–10	Regionalliga Nord	14	4	—		—		—		14	4	
Hannover II	2013–14	Regionalliga Nord	2	1	—		—		—		2	1	
Hannover II	Total		46	10	0	0	0	0	0	0	46	10	—
Hannover	2009–10	Bundesliga	14	0	1	0	—		—		15	0	
Hannover	2010–11	Bundesliga	32	0	1	0	—		—		33	0	
Hannover	2011–12	Bundesliga	30	0	2	0	12	0	—		44	0	
Hannover	2012–13	Bundesliga	21	0	3	0	12	1	—		36	1	
Hannover	2013–14	Bundesliga	24	1	2	0	—		—		26	1	
Hannover	2014–15	Bundesliga	27	0	1	0	—		—		28	0	
Hannover	2015–16	Bundesliga	22	1	2	0	—		—		24	1	
Hannover	2016–17	Bundesliga	26	0	2	0	—		—		28	0	
Hannover	2017–18	Bundesliga	6	0	1	0	—		—		7	0	
Hannover	Total		202	2	15	0	24	1	0	0	241	3	—
Union Berlin (loan)	2018–19	2. Bundesliga	32	0	2	0	—		2	0	36	0	
Union Berlin	2019–20	Bundesliga	5	0	1	0	—		—		6	0	
Career total			321	18	18	0	24	1	2	0	365	19	—
