= Samir Kozarac =

Swiss footballer (born 1981)

Personal information
- Date of birth: 21 August 1981 (age 45)
- Place of birth: Ključ, SFR Yugoslavia
- Height: 1.93 m (6 ft 4 in)
- Position: Defensive midfielder

Senior career*
Years	Team	Apps	(Gls)
2001–2003	FC Baden	42	(1)
2003–2006	FC Winterthur	83	(8)
2006–2007	St. Gallen	8	(0)
2007	SC Kriens	11	(1)
2008	FC Wohlen	12	(0)
2008–2009	Fortuna Sittard	29	(2)
2009–2010	SV Wilhelmshaven		
2010–2012	SV Elversberg	46	(3)
- * Club domestic league appearances and goals

Samir Kozarac (born 21 August 1981) is a Swiss former professional footballer who played as a defensive midfielder. He started his career at Switzerland and in August 2008 moved to Dutch club Fortuna Sittard.
