= Mario Eggimann =

Swiss footballer (born 1981)

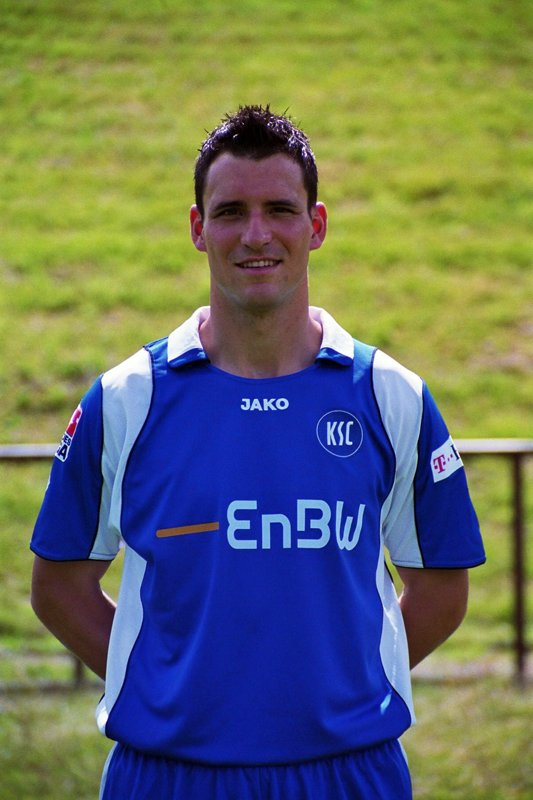

Personal information
- Full name: Mario Eggimann
- Date of birth: 24 January 1981 (age 45)
- Place of birth: Brugg, Switzerland
- Height: 1.89 m (6 ft 2 1/2 in)
- Position: Defender

Youth career
- 1988–1989: FC Küttigen
- 1989–1998: FC Aarau

Senior career*
Years	Team	Apps	(Gls)
1998–2002	FC Aarau	41	(1)
2002–2008	Karlsruher SC	176	(18)
2008–2013	Hannover 96	93	(2)
2010	Hannover 96 II	1	(0)
2013–2015	Union Berlin	17	(1)
Total		328	(22)

International career
2007–2010	Switzerland	10	(0)
- * Club domestic league appearances and goals

Mario Eggimann (born 24 January 1981) is a Swiss former footballer who played as a defender. He also earned caps for the Swiss national team.

== Club career ==
Born in Brugg, Switzerland, Eggimann began his career with local side FC Küttigen before moving to bigger local rivals FC Aarau where he began his professional career making his professional debut in 1998. He played at Stadion Brugglifeld for FC Aarau until 2002 when he headed to Germany to play in the Bundesliga for Karlsruher SC. In the 2006–07 season Eggimann was made captain as Karlsruher SC were champions of the 2. Bundesliga.

In March 2008, Eggimann exercised a clause in his contract by moving to Hannover 96 for €1.4 million. He signed a contract until June 2013. After the end of the 2014–15 season, Eggimann did not receive an extension of his expiring contract with Union Berlin, having only earned 17 caps caused by multiple injuries since his arrival in 2013.

In October 2015, Eggimann announced his retirement from professional football.

== International career ==
Eggimann was captain of the Swiss U21 national team. On 7 September 2007, he played first for the Swiss national football team coming on as a half-time substitute for Johan Djourou in a 2–1 victory against Chile in Vienna. The match was part of a tournament in Austria, comprising Japan and Austria as well as Chile and Switzerland.

Eggimann was selected by then-coach Köbi Kuhn prior to Euro 2008 but did not make the final squad. He has been selected by Ottmar Hitzfeld for the 2010 World Cup.

== Personal life ==
On 20 February 2008, Eggimann became a father for the first time to a baby girl.
