= Didier Ya Konan =

Ivorian footballer (born 1984)

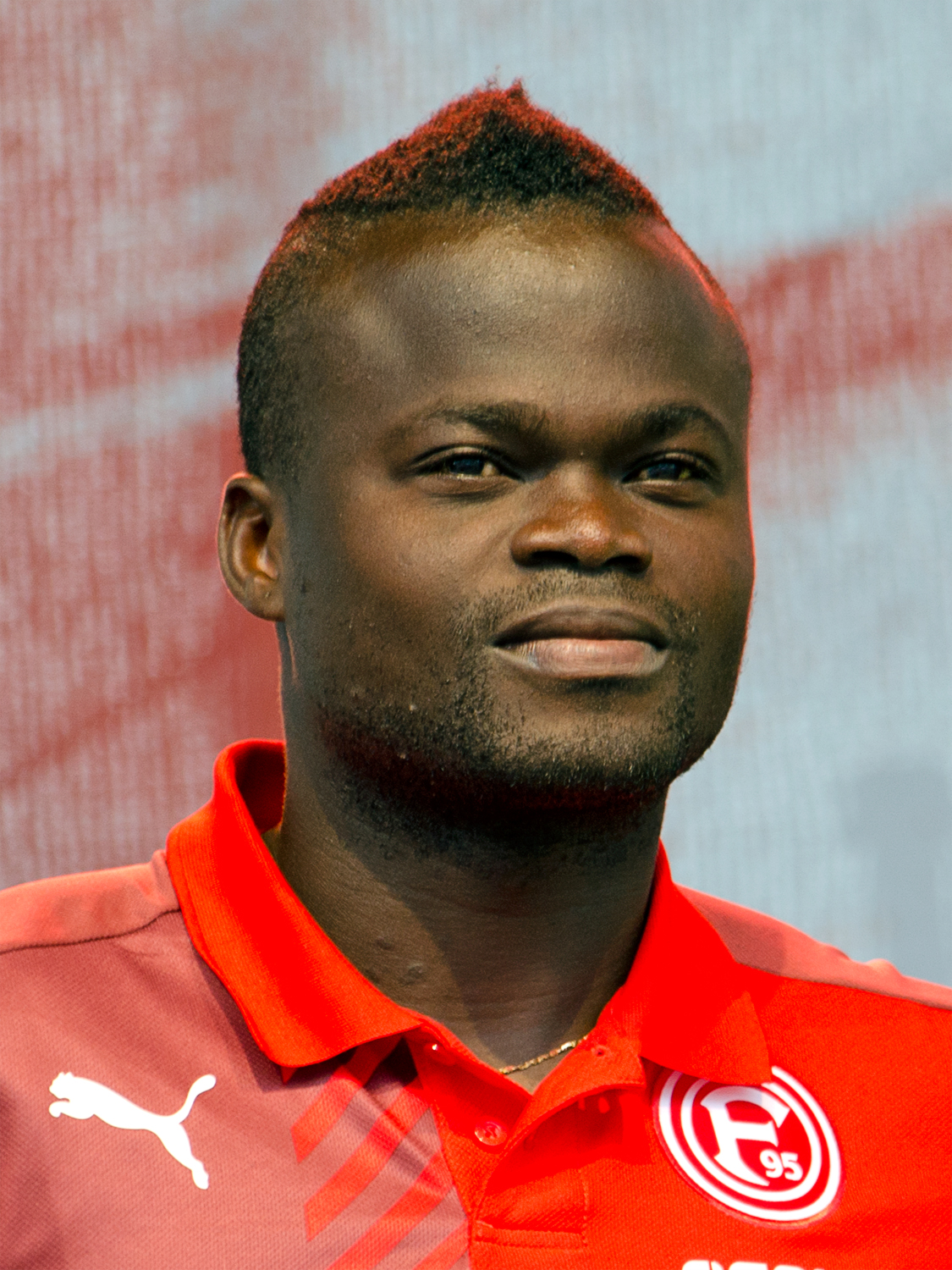
- Ya Konan in 2015

Personal information
- Full name: Didier Ya Konan
- Date of birth: 22 May 1984 (age 42)
- Place of birth: Abidjan, Ivory Coast
- Height: 1.74 m (5 ft 9 in)
- Position: Forward

Youth career
- 2003: ASEC Mimosas

Senior career*
Years	Team	Apps	(Gls)
2003–2006	ASEC Mimosas	77	(13)
2006–2009	Rosenborg	50	(13)
2009–2014	Hannover 96	124	(39)
2014–2015	Al-Ittihad	14	(8)
2015	Hannover 96	7	(1)
2015–2017	Fortuna Düsseldorf	20	(4)
Total		292	(78)

International career
2006–2014	Ivory Coast	27	(8)
- * Club domestic league appearances and goals

Didier Ya Konan (born 22 May 1984) is an Ivorian former professional footballer who played as a forward.

== Club career ==
Ya Konan started his professional career at ASEC Mimosas in 2003. A club that previously had produced players as Kolo Touré and Didier Zokora. Ya Konan was joint top scorer in the African Champions League competition that season, with ASEC eventually failing in the semi finals, to Egyptian club Al Ahly.

In December 2006, he signed for Rosenborg, for a three-year contract in the Norwegian Premier League.

In January 2007, Ya Konan was nominated for the Ivorian Footballer of the Year award for 2006, which was eventually won by Chelsea striker Didier Drogba. He was one of two homeland based players at the time to be nominated, the other being former ASEC teammate Bakary Soro.

On 11 August 2009, Ya Konan moved to Bundesliga side Hannover 96, initially signing a three-year contract.

Following the 2013–14 season he left Germany and completed a move to Al-Ittihad of the Saudi Professional League.

On 27 January 2015, he returned to Hannover 96, where he signed a one-year contract.

On 25 June 2015, Ya Konan signed a two-year deal with Fortuna Düsseldorf.

== International career ==
Ya Konan was called up to the Ivory Coast national team for the 2008 African Cup of Nations qualifier against Gabon on 5 October 2006. In March 2007, he was one of four players to receive a late call-up for the Ivorian's African Cup of Nations qualifier against Madagascar in Antananarivo, due to injuries to other members of the squad.

== Career statistics ==
=== Club ===
Appearances and goals by club, season and competition
Season	Club	League			Cup		Europe		Total	
Season	Club	Division	Apps	Goals	Apps	Goals	Apps	Goals	Apps	Goals
Rosenborg	2007	Tippeligaen	20	6			9	1	29	7
Rosenborg	2008	Tippeligaen	22	6	0	0	8	2	30	8
Rosenborg	2009	Tippeligaen	8	1	3	2	4	1	15	4
Rosenborg	Total		50	13	3	2	21	4	74	19
Hannover 96	2009–10	Bundesliga	25	9	0	0	—		25	9
Hannover 96	2010–11	Bundesliga	28	14	1	0	—		29	14
Hannover 96	2011–12	Bundesliga	28	6	1	0	12	1	41	7
Hannover 96	2012–13	Bundesliga	27	7	3	0	10	4	40	11
Hannover 96	2013–14	Bundesliga	16	3	0	0	0	0	16	3
Hannover 96	Total		124	39	5	0	22	5	151	44
Al-Ittihad	2014–15	Saudi Pro League	6	2	—		1	0	7	2
Hannover 96	2014–15	Bundesliga	7	1	0	0	—		7	1
Fortuna Düsseldorf	2015–16	2. Bundesliga	20	4	2	0	—		22	4
Career total			211	59	10	2	44	9	261	70

=== International ===
Appearances and goals by national team and year
National team	Year	Apps	Goals
Ivory Coast	2006	1	0
Ivory Coast	2007	2	0
Ivory Coast	2008	0	0
Ivory Coast	2010	0	0
Ivory Coast	2011	7	5
Ivory Coast	2012	9	1
Ivory Coast	2013	6	2
Ivory Coast	2014	2	0
Ivory Coast	2017	0	0
Total		27	8

Scores and results list Ivory Coast's goal tally first, score column indicates score after each Ya Konan goal.

List of international goals scored by Didier Ya Konan
No.	Date	Venue	Opponent	Score	Result	Competition
1	8 February 2011	Stade Georges Pompidou, Valence, France	Mali	1–0	1–0	Friendly
2	11 May 2011	Stade Félix Houphouët-Boigny, Abidjan, Ivory Coast	Namibia	4–1	5–1	Friendly
3	5 June 2011	Stade de l'Amitié, Cotonou, Benin	Benin	1–0'	6–2	2012 Africa Cup of Nations qualification
4	10 August 2011	Stade de Genève, Geneva, Switzerland	Israel	1–0	4–3	Friendly
5	3 September 2011	Stade Amahoro, Kigali, Rwanda	Rwanda	4–0	5–0	2012 Africa Cup of Nations qualification
6	14 November 2012	Linzer Stadion, Linz, Austria	Austria	1–0	3–0	Friendly
7	14 January 2013	Al Nahyan Stadium, Abu Dhabi, United Arab Emirates	Egypt	4–2	4–2	Friendly
8	26 January 2013	Royal Bafokeng Stadium, Rustenburg, South Africa	Tunisia	3–0	3–0	2013 Africa Cup of Nations

== Honours ==
ASEC Mimosas

- Côte d'Ivoire Premier Division: 2004, 2005, 2006
- Côte d'Ivoire Cup: 2005
- Coupe Houphouët-Boigny: 2004, 2006

Rosenborg

- Norwegian Premier League Championship: 2009

Ivory Coast

- Africa Cup of Nations runner-up: 2012
