= Willi Evseev =

German footballer (born 1992)

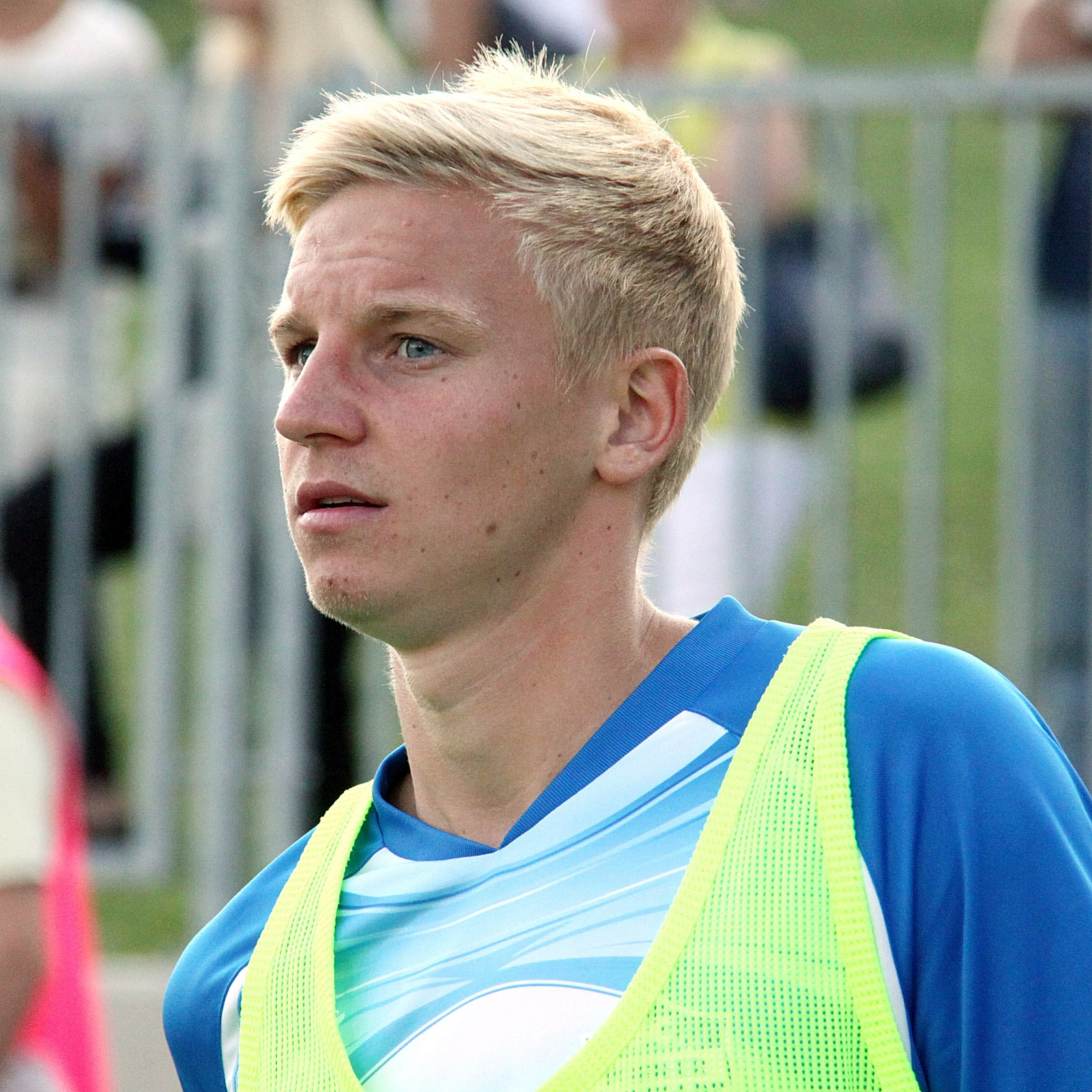
- Evseev with Wiener Neustadt in 2011

Personal information
- Full name: Wilhelm Evseev
- Date of birth: 14 February 1992 (age 34)
- Place of birth: Temirtau, Kazakhstan
- Height: 1.76 m (5 ft 9 in)
- Position: Midfielder

Team information
- Current team: FSV Schöningen
- Number: 32

Youth career
- 1996–2010: Hannover 96

Senior career*
Years	Team	Apps	(Gls)
2010–2013	Hannover 96 II	58	(10)
2010–2013	Hannover 96	0	(0)
2011–2012	→ Wiener Neustadt (loan)	20	(0)
2013–2014	VfL Wolfsburg II	24	(11)
2013–2014	VfL Wolfsburg	3	(0)
2014–2017	1. FC Nürnberg	1	(0)
2015–2017	1. FC Nürnberg II	29	(5)
2016	→ Holstein Kiel (loan)	7	(1)
2017–2019	Hansa Rostock	31	(3)
2019–2025	SV Meppen	126	(16)
2025–	FSV Schöningen	30	(1)

International career
2008–2009	Germany U17	8	(0)
2009–2010	Germany U18	7	(1)
- * Club domestic league appearances and goals as of 20 June 2026

Wilhelm "Willi" Evseev (born 14 February 1992) is a German professional footballer who plays as a midfielder for FSV Schöningen.

== Career ==
Evseev was born in Kazakhstan but his family emigrated to Germany when he was an infant.

In April 2019, it was announced Evseev would be joining 3. Liga side SV Meppen from league rivals Hansa Rostock for the 2019–20 season. He agreed a two-year deal with Meppen.
