= 2009–10 Alemannia Aachen season =

Alemannia Aachen
2009–10 season
- Chairman: Dr. Alfred Nachtsheim
- Manager: Michael Krüger
- 2. Bundesliga: -
- DFB-Pokal: Second round
- Top goalscorer: League: Auer (6); All: Auer (9)
- Highest home attendance: 32,900 (vs St. Pauli)
Home colours	Away colours

Alemannia Aachen competed in the 2. Bundesliga in the 2009-10 season.

== Transfers ==
In: Note: Flags indicate national team as defined under FIFA eligibility rules; some limited exceptions apply. Players may hold more than one non-FIFA nationality.

No.	Pos.	Nation	Player
2	DF	GER	Nico Herzig (from Arminia Bielefeld)
10	MF	GER	Thorsten Burkhardt (from SpVgg Greuther Fürth)
12	MF	TUN	Aïmen Demai (from 1. FC Kaiserslautern)
13	GK	GER	Thomas Unger (from Karlsruher SC)
14	FW	SEN	Babacar Gueye (from FC Metz)
15	MF	GER	Kevin Kratz (from Bayer 04 Leverkusen II)
24	MF	GER	Daniel Adlung (on loan from VfL Wolfsburg)
25	FW	GER	Manuel Junglas (from Alemannia Aachen II)
33	MF	TUR	Abdulkadir Özgen (from Alemannia Aachen II)

Out: Note: Flags indicate national team as defined under FIFA eligibility rules; some limited exceptions apply. Players may hold more than one non-FIFA nationality.

No.	Pos.	Nation	Player
1	GK	GER	Stephan Straub (retired)
4	DF	CRO	Hrvoje Vuković (released)
5	MF	FIN	Pekka Lagerblom (to FSV Frankfurt)
14	MF	GER	Daniel Brinkmann (to FC Augsburg)
18	FW	GER	Lewis Holtby (to FC Schalke 04)
20	MF	GER	Matthias Lehmann (to FC St. Pauli)
29	MF	GER	Jochen Seitz (to Chernomorets Burgas)

== Players ==
=== Appearances and goals ===
Appearance and goalscoring records for all the players who were in the Alemannia Aachen first team squad during the 2009–10 season.

No.	Pos	Nat	Player	Total		2. Bundesliga		DFB-Pokal	
No.	Pos	Nat	Player	Apps	Goals	Apps	Goals	Apps	Goals
1	GK	(Germany) GER	Thorsten Stuckmann	18	0	16	0	2	0
2	DF	(Germany) GER	Nico Herzig	14	0	14	0	0	0
5	DF	(Poland) POL	Łukasz Szukała	7	1	5	0	2	1
6	DF	(Germany) GER	Jérome Polenz	3	0	3	0	0	0
7	MF	(Germany) GER	Reiner Plaßhenrich	0	0	0	0	0	0
8	FW	(Slovakia) SVK	Szilárd Németh	10	1	9	0	1	1
9	FW	(Germany) GER	Benjamin Auer	17	9	15	6	2	3
10	MF	(Germany) GER	Thorsten Burkhardt	17	1	15	1	2	0
11	FW	(Germany) GER	Markus Daun	0	0	0	0	0	0
12	MF	(Tunisia) TUN	Aïmen Demai	10	2	9	2	1	0
13	GK	(Germany) GER	Thomas Unger	0	0	0	0	0	0
14	FW	(Senegal) SEN	Babacar Gueye	19	5	17	3	2	2
15	MF	(Germany) GER	Kevin Kratz	13	0	12	0	1	0
16	MF	(Germany) GER	Florian Müller	10	0	8	0	2	0
17	DF	(Germany) GER	Thomas Stehle	0	0	0	0	0	0
19	DF	(Nigeria) NGR	Seyi Olajengbesi	19	0	17	0	2	0
21	MF	(Spain) ESP	Cristian Fiél	18	0	16	0	2	0
22	GK	(Germany) GER	David Hohs	1	0	1	0	0	0
23	FW	(Burkina Faso) BFA	Hervé Oussalé	13	1	11	0	2	1
24	MF	(Germany) GER	Daniel Adlung	10	0	10	0	0	0
25	FW	(Germany) GER	Manuel Junglas	17	1	15	1	2	0
26	MF	(Germany) GER	Patrick Milchraum	14	1	12	1	2	0
27	MF	(Germany) GER	Faton Popova	0	0	0	0	0	0
28	DF	(Germany) GER	Mirko Casper	9	1	8	1	1	0
30	MF	(Austria) AUT	Andreas Lasnik	0	0	0	0	0	0
31	DF	(Belgium) BEL	Alper Uludag	4	0	4	0	0	0
32	DF	(Germany) GER	Timo Achenbach	19	0	17	0	2	0
33	FW	(Turkey) TUR	Abdulkadir Özgen	2	0	2	0	0	0

== 2. Bundesliga ==
=== Results ===
Win Draw Loss

Note: Results are given with Alemannia Aachen score listed first.

Game	Date	Venue	Opponent	Result F–A	Attendance	Alemannia Aachen Goalscorers
1	7 August 2009	A	Karlsruher SC	1–1	23,332	Drpic (o.g.) 53'
2	17 August 2009	H	FC St. Pauli	0-5	32,900
3	23 August 2009	A	Kaiserslautern	1-1	28,079	Gueye 17'
4	30 August 2009	H	FSV Frankfurt	3-0	23,078	Auer (2) 13', 89', Junglas 34'
5	13 September 2009	A	R-W Oberhausen	0-1	7,134
6	20 September 2009	H	1860 München	2-0	24,830	Auer (2) 43', 90'
7	28 September 2009	A	Fortuna Düsseldorf	0-0	29,385
8	2 October 2009	H	Energie Cottbus	1-1	22,090	Auer 8'
9	16 October 2009	A	Arminia Bielefeld	0-1	15,200
10	25 October 2009	H	Union Berlin	1-4	26,050	Demai 66'
11	1 November 2009	A	Augsburg	1-0	11,879	Burkhardt 57'
12	9 November 2009	H	Hansa Rostock	1-0	21,274	Demai 11'
13	22 November 2009	A	Koblenz	0-1	7,599
14	27 November 2009	H	R-W Ahlen	0-2	21,010
15	7 December 2009	A	Greuther Fürth	2-0	4,750	Milchraum 10', Auer 72'
16	11 December 2009	H	Paderborn	1-1	21,128	Casper 42'
17	18 December 2009	A	Duisburg	2-0	16,288	Gueye (2) 23', 78'

== DFB-Pokal ==
=== Results ===
Win Draw Loss

Note: Results are given with Alemannia Aachen score listed first.

Round	Date	Venue	Opponent	Result F–A	Attendance	Alemannia Aachen Goalscorers
1	2 August 2009	A	Torgelower SC Greif	4-1	3,700	Szukała 5', Auer 43', Németh (pen.) 56', Oussalé 73'
2	23 September 2009	A	Eintracht Frankfurt	4-6	25,450	Gueye (2) 23', 87', Auer (2) 65', 72'
