= 2004–05 Alemannia Aachen season =

Alemannia Aachen
2004–05 season
- Manager: Dieter Hecking
- Stadium: Old Tivoli (domestic matches); RheinEnergieStadion (European matches)
- 2. Bundesliga: 6th
- DFB-Pokal: Second round
- UEFA Cup: Round of 32
- Top goalscorer: Kai Michalke (11)
Home colours	Away colours

During the 2004–05 German football season, Alemannia Aachen competed in the 2. Bundesliga.

== Season summary ==
Alemannia Aachen failed to gain promotion to the Bundesliga or even repeat their cup run of the previous season, but still enjoyed a decent run in the UEFA Cup, making it through the group stages before being knocked out in the round of 32 by eventual semi-finalists AZ.

== First-team squad ==
Squad at end of season

Note: Flags indicate national team as defined under FIFA eligibility rules; some limited exceptions apply. Players may hold more than one non-FIFA nationality.

No.	Pos.	Nation	Player
1	GK	GER	Stephan Straub
2	DF	GER	Frank Paulus
3	DF	GER	Alexander Klitzpera
4	DF	GER	Thomas Hengen
5	MF	GER	Dennis Brinkmann
6	DF	GER	Willi Landgraf
7	MF	GER	Reiner Plaßhenrich
8	MF	GER	Simon Rolfes
9	FW	FRA	Daniel Gomez
10	MF	SCG	Ivan Petrović
11	FW	NED	Erik Meijer
12	DF	ZAM	Moses Sichone
13	MF	GER	Florian Bruns

No.	Pos.	Nation	Player
15	GK	GER	Marcus Hesse
16	FW	SCO	Chris Iwelumo
17	DF	GER	Thomas Stehle
18	MF	POR	Sergio Pinto
19	FW	GER	Jan Schlaudraff
20	FW	GER	Jens Scharping
21	MF	GER	Cristian Fiél
22	FW	GER	Kai Michalke
23	MF	ROU	Laurențiu Reghecampf
24	GK	GER	Kristian Nicht
27	DF	COD	Emil Noll
28	DF	GER	Mirko Casper
29	DF	GHA	Edwin Bediako

=== Left club during season ===
Note: Flags indicate national team as defined under FIFA eligibility rules; some limited exceptions apply. Players may hold more than one non-FIFA nationality.

No.	Pos.	Nation	Player
33	DF	GER	Stefan Blank (to Kaiserslautern)

== Transfers ==
=== In ===
- Emil Noll - VfR Aalen
- Mirko Casper - Yurdumspor Köln
- Moses Sichone - Köln
- Thomas Hengen - 1. FC Kaiserslautern
- Thomas Stehle - 1. FC Nürnberg
- Jan Schlaudraff - Borussia Mönchengladbach, January
- Sergio Pinto - FC Schalke 04
- Jens Scharping - VfB Lübeck
- Cristian Fiél - VfL Bochum
- Kristian Nicht - 1. FC Nürnberg
- Florian Bruns - 1. FC Union Berlin
- Chris Iwelumo - unattached (last at Stoke City), 12 July
- Simon Rolfes - Werder Bremen
- Ivan Petrović - Napredak Kruševac

== Results ==
=== UEFA Cup ===
==== Round of 32 ====
- Alemannia Aachen 0-0 AZ
- AZ 2-1 Alemannia Aachen
