= 2008–09 2. Bundesliga =

35th season of the second-tier football league in Germany

2. Bundesliga
- Season: 2008–09
- Champions: SC Freiburg
- Promoted: SC Freiburg; 1. FSV Mainz 05; 1. FC Nürnberg (via playoff)
- Relegated: VfL Osnabrück (via playoff); FC Ingolstadt 04; SV Wehen Wiesbaden
- Matches: 306
- Goals: 852 (2.78 per match)
- Top goalscorer: Benjamin Auer (16); Cédric Makiadi (16); Marek Mintál (16)
- Biggest home win: Rostock 9–0 Koblenz
- Biggest away win: Oberhausen 0–4 Greuther Fürth
- Highest scoring: Rostock 9–0 Koblenz

The 2008–09 2. Bundesliga was the 35th season of the 2. Bundesliga, the second tier of Germany's football league. The season began on 15 August 2008 and ended on 24 May 2009.

SC Freiburg were the first team to win promotion to Bundesliga 2009–10 after securing the 2. Bundesliga championship on 10 May 2009. 1. FSV Mainz 05 were also directly promoted as runners-up after a 4–0 home victory over Rot-Weiß Oberhausen. 1. FC Nürnberg defeated Bundesliga sides Energie Cottbus in a two-legged playoff for one spot in 2009–10 Bundesliga and thus earned promotion as well.

== Changes from 2007–08 ==
Starting with the 2008–09 season, only two teams are promoted automatically. Two-leg relegation playoffs between the third last team of the Bundesliga and the third team of the 2. Bundesliga at the end of the regular season will be reintroduced.

Likewise, instead of formerly four teams only the two bottom teams are relegated to the new 3. Liga automatically. The third last team plays a two-leg playoff against the third team of the third tier over the remaining place in the 2. Bundesliga.

== Teams ==
=== Movement between Bundesliga and 2. Bundesliga ===
Borussia Mönchengladbach, TSG 1899 Hoffenheim and 1. FC Köln were promoted to Bundesliga after finishing 1st through third in 2. Bundesliga in 2007–08. They were replaced by 1. FC Nürnberg, Hansa Rostock and MSV Duisburg, which were relegated at the end of the 2007–08 Bundesliga season.

=== Movement between 2. Bundesliga and third-level divisions ===
Kickers Offenbach, Erzgebirge Aue, FC Carl Zeiss Jena and SC Paderborn 07 were relegated to the newly formed 3. Liga following the 2007–08 season due to finishing 15th through 18th. They were replaced by the champions and runners-up of both divisions of the 2007–08 Regionalliga. Rot Weiss Ahlen and Rot-Weiss Oberhausen earned promotion in the Regionalliga Nord while FSV Frankfurt and FC Ingolstadt 04 were promoted from the Regionalliga Süd.

=== Stadiums and locations ===
Location of teams in 2. Bundesliga 2008–09

Team	Venue	Capacity
Alemannia Aachen	Tivoli	21,632
Rot Weiss Ahlen	Wersestadion	10,498
FC Augsburg	Rosenaustadion	32,354
MSV Duisburg	MSV-Arena	31,500
FSV Frankfurt	Commerzbank-Arena	52,300
SC Freiburg	Badenova-Stadion	24,918
SpVgg Greuther Fürth	Playmobil-Stadion	15,500
FC Ingolstadt 04	ESV-Stadion	16,500
1. FC Kaiserslautern	Fritz Walter Stadion	48,500
TuS Koblenz	Stadion Oberwerth	13,500
1. FSV Mainz 05	Stadion am Bruchweg	20,300
TSV 1860 Munich	Allianz Arena	69,901
1. FC Nürnberg	Frankenstadion	47,559
Rot-Weiß Oberhausen	Niederrheinstadion	21,318
VfL Osnabrück	Osnatel-Arena	18,415
FC Hansa Rostock	DKB-Arena	29,000
FC St. Pauli	Millerntor-Stadion	22,648
SV Wehen Wiesbaden	BRITA-Arena	12,566

=== Personnel and sponsoring ===
Team	Head coach	Team captain	Kitmaker	Shirt sponsor
Alemannia Aachen	(Germany) Jürgen Seeberger	(Germany) Reiner Plaßhenrich	Jako	Aachen Münchener
Rot Weiss Ahlen	(Germany) Stefan Emmerling	(Germany) Daniel Thioune	Jako	reflex
FC Augsburg	(Netherlands) Jos Luhukay	(Germany) Lars Müller	Do You Football	impuls
MSV Duisburg	(Germany) Peter Neururer	(Bosnia and Herzegovina) Ivica Grlić	uhlsport	evonik
FSV Frankfurt	(Turkey) Tomas Oral	(Italy) Angelo Barletta	Jako	Hyundai
SC Freiburg	(Germany) Robin Dutt	(Germany) Heiko Butscher	Jako	Duravit
SpVgg Greuther Fürth	(Germany) Benno Möhlmann	(Germany) Daniel Felgenhauer	Jako	Karstadt Quelle Versicherungen
FC Ingolstadt	(Germany) Horst Köppel	(Germany) Stefan Leitl	Nike	Audi
1. FC Kaiserslautern	(Germany) Alois Schwartz (interim)	(Germany) Axel Bellinghausen	Kappa	Deutsche Vermögensberatung
TuS Koblenz	(Germany) Uwe Rapolder	(Bosnia and Herzegovina) Branimir Bajić	Nike	Rhein-Zeitung
1. FSV Mainz 05	(Norway) Jørn Andersen	(Germany) Dimo Wache	Nike	DBV-Winterthur
TSV 1860 Munich	(Germany) Ewald Lienen	(Germany) Daniel Bierofka	erima	trenkwalder
1. FC Nürnberg	(Germany) Michael Oenning	(Germany) Andreas Wolf	adidas	Areva
Rot-Weiß Oberhausen	(Germany) Jürgen Luginger	(Germany) Benjamin Reichert	uhlsport	Vatro
VfL Osnabrück	(Germany) Claus-Dieter Wollitz	(Germany) Thomas Reichenberger	Puma	Herforder
FC Hansa Rostock	(Germany) Andreas Zachhuber	(Denmark) Martin Retov	Masita	Lübzer
FC St. Pauli	(Germany) Holger Stanislawski	(Germany) Fabio Morena	Do You Football	congstar
SV Wehen Wiesbaden	(Germany) Sandro Schwarz (Interim)	(Germany) Alexander Walke	Nike	Victor's

=== Managerial changes ===
Team	Outgoing manager	Manner of departure	Date of vacancy	Replaced by	Date of appointment
1. FC Nürnberg	(Germany) Thomas von Heesen	Resigned	28 August 2008	(Germany) Michael Oenning	5 September 2008
MSV Duisburg	(Germany) Rudi Bommer	Sacked	9 November 2008	(Germany) Peter Neururer	16 November 2008
FC Hansa Rostock	(Germany) Frank Pagelsdorf	Sacked	10 November 2008	(Germany) Dieter Eilts	21 November 2008
SV Wehen Wiesbaden	(Germany) Christian Hock	Sacked	17 December 2008	(Germany) Wolfgang Frank	19 December 2008
TSV 1860 Munich	(Germany) Marco Kurz	Sacked	24 February 2009	(Germany) Uwe Wolf (Interim)	24 February 2009
Rot Weiss Ahlen	(Germany) Christian Wück	Sacked	3 March 2009	(Germany) Stefan Emmerling	16 April 2009
FC Hansa Rostock	(Germany) Dieter Eilts	Sacked	6 March 2009	(Germany) Andreas Zachhuber	8 March 2009
SV Wehen Wiesbaden	(Germany) Wolfgang Frank	Sacked	23 March 2009	(Germany) Sandro Schwarz (Interim)	23 March 2009
FC Augsburg	(Germany) Holger Fach	Sacked	13 April 2009	(Netherlands) Jos Luhukay	14 April 2009
FC Ingolstadt 04	(Germany) Thorsten Fink	Sacked	21 April 2009	(Germany) Horst Köppel	26 April 2009
1. FC Kaiserslautern	(Croatia) Milan Šašić	Sacked	4 May 2009	(Germany) Alois Schwartz (interim)	4 May 2009
TSV 1860 Munich	(Germany) Uwe Wolf (Interim)	Released from duties	13 May 2009	(Germany) Ewald Lienen	13 May 2009

== League table ==
Pos	Team	Pld	W	D	L	GF	GA	GD	Pts	Promotion, qualification or relegation
1	SC Freiburg (C, P)	34	21	5	8	60	36	+24	68	Promotion to Bundesliga
2	Mainz 05 (P)	34	18	9	7	62	37	+25	63	Promotion to Bundesliga
3	1. FC Nürnberg (O, P)	34	16	12	6	51	29	+22	60	Qualification for promotion play-offs
4	Alemannia Aachen	34	16	8	10	58	38	+20	56	
5	Greuther Fürth	34	16	8	10	60	46	+14	56	
6	MSV Duisburg	34	14	13	7	56	36	+20	55	
7	1. FC Kaiserslautern	34	15	7	12	53	48	+5	52	
8	FC St. Pauli	34	14	6	14	52	59	−7	48	
9	Rot-Weiß Oberhausen	34	11	9	14	35	54	−19	42	
10	Rot Weiss Ahlen	34	11	8	15	38	57	−19	41	
11	FC Augsburg	34	10	10	14	43	46	−3	40	
12	1860 Munich	34	9	12	13	44	46	−2	39	
13	Hansa Rostock	34	8	14	12	52	53	−1	38	
14	TuS Koblenz	34	11	8	15	47	57	−10	38 (Note: Due to licensing irregularities in the 2007–08 season, TuS Koblenz started with a three point deduction.)	
15	FSV Frankfurt	34	9	11	14	34	47	−13	38	
16	VfL Osnabrück (R)	34	8	12	14	41	60	−19	36	Qualification for relegation play-offs
17	FC Ingolstadt (R)	34	7	10	17	38	54	−16	31	Relegation to 3. Liga
18	Wehen Wiesbaden (R)	34	5	12	17	28	49	−21	27	Relegation to 3. Liga

Source: kicker
Rules for classification: 1) points; 2) goal difference; 3) number of goals scored.
(C) Champions; (O) Play-off winners; (P) Promoted; (R) Relegated

== Results ==
Home \ Away	AAC	RWA	FCA	DUI	FSV	SCF	SGF	FCI	FCK	KOB	M05	M60	FCN	RWO	OSN	ROS	STP	WEH
Alemannia Aachen	—	0–2	4–0	1–2	2–0	1–0	1–0	1–0	1–0	2–0	2–0	2–0	6–2	2–2	3–1	3–3	1–3	2–1
Rot Weiss Ahlen	0–2	—	2–1	0–2	2–1	0–3	2–4	3–0	0–1	1–1	0–2	2–1	1–1	1–3	1–2	2–2	1–0	1–0
FC Augsburg	3–1	3–0	—	1–1	2–2	1–3	1–1	1–1	1–0	0–2	0–2	3–0	0–0	1–2	3–0	2–0	3–2	1–1
MSV Duisburg	3–2	0–1	2–0	—	0–0	2–0	2–0	6–1	0–0	2–3	0–1	4–1	2–2	1–1	4–1	2–2	1–2	2–1
FSV Frankfurt	0–3	4–0	2–1	0–0	—	1–2	1–1	1–1	1–0	0–0	1–4	0–3	2–1	3–1	1–0	0–0	1–0	2–1
SC Freiburg	2–1	1–1	1–0	2–0	4–1	—	0–0	3–2	4–3	1–1	0–1	2–1	0–1	2–1	4–1	1–0	2–0	5–0
Greuther Fürth	1–1	3–0	2–1	4–3	0–0	1–1	—	6–1	0–1	4–3	0–2	1–0	1–1	3–1	4–2	0–1	5–2	1–1
FC Ingolstadt	0–0	0–2	1–2	0–0	1–1	4–0	3–2	—	1–3	4–0	3–4	2–3	0–3	0–0	2–1	4–2	0–1	0–0
1. FC Kaiserslautern	1–1	4–1	1–0	3–5	2–1	2–0	1–2	2–0	—	2–1	1–1	0–0	2–1	1–1	2–0	6–0	4–1	1–0
TuS Koblenz	0–2	4–1	2–1	1–1	1–3	2–5	3–0	0–1	5–0	—	0–3	3–2	1–1	3–0	3–0	1–1	2–1	0–0
Mainz 05	1–4	0–0	1–1	0–0	2–1	1–2	0–1	0–3	3–3	2–0	—	2–2	2–0	4–0	4–2	3–1	2–2	5–0
1860 Munich	1–1	2–1	0–1	2–0	1–1	0–2	3–1	1–1	1–1	1–0	1–2	—	1–1	0–1	1–1	3–3	5–1	3–3
1. FC Nürnberg	2–2	4–0	2–1	0–1	0–0	2–0	2–1	1–0	3–0	2–0	0–0	2–1	—	2–1	2–0	4–0	2–0	1–0
Rot-Weiß Oberhausen	1–1	1–3	2–1	0–3	2–0	1–0	0–4	2–1	2–1	0–0	2–1	1–1	0–3	—	0–0	1–0	3–2	0–1
VfL Osnabrück	2–1	2–2	1–1	1–1	3–2	2–2	5–1	1–0	0–2	1–0	1–3	0–2	1–1	2–1	—	0–0	2–2	1–1
Hansa Rostock	1–0	0–0	3–3	0–1	2–0	1–3	1–2	1–1	5–1	9–0	2–2	0–1	0–0	3–1	2–2	—	3–0	1–0
FC St. Pauli	3–2	2–2	1–1	2–2	2–0	1–2	0–3	1–0	2–0	3–2	2–0	1–0	1–0	4–1	2–2	3–2	—	2–0
Wehen Wiesbaden	1–0	1–3	1–2	1–1	3–1	0–1	0–1	0–0	4–2	1–3	0–2	0–0	2–2	0–0	0–1	1–1	3–1	—

Source: DFB
Legend: Blue = home team win; Yellow = draw; Red = away team win.

== Promotion/relegation play-offs ==
VfL Osnabrück, as the 16th-placed team, had to face third-placed 3. Liga team SC Paderborn 07 for a two-legged playoff. Paderborn won both matches on an aggregated score of 2–0 and thus secured promotion to 2. Bundesliga 2009–10, while Osnabrück were relegated to 3. Liga 2009–10.

29 May 2009
20:30 CEST

SC Paderborn 07	1–0	VfL Osnabrück
Löning 78'	Report (in German)

Paragon Arena, Paderborn
Attendance: 15,000 (capacity crowd)
Referee: Wolfgang Stark (Ergolding)

1 June 2009
15:30 CEST

VfL Osnabrück	0–1	SC Paderborn 07
	Report (in German)	Löning 63'

Osnatel-Arena, Osnabrück
Attendance: 16,250 (capacity crowd)
Referee: Felix Brych (Munich)

== Top goalscorers ==
16 goals

- (Germany) Benjamin Auer (Alemannia Aachen)
- (Democratic Republic of the Congo) Cédric Makiadi (MSV Duisburg)
- (Slovakia) Marek Mintál (1. FC Nürnberg)

15 goals

- (Tunisia) Sami Allagui (SpVgg Greuther Fürth)
- (Germany) Benjamin Lauth (1860 Munich)

14 goals

- (Burkina Faso) Aristide Bancé (1. FSV Mainz 05)
- (Slovakia) Erik Jendrišek (1. FC Kaiserslautern)
- (Cameroon) Dorge Kouemaha (MSV Duisburg)
- (Germany) Michael Thurk (FC Augsburg)

13 goals

- (Cameroon) Mohammadou Idrissou (SC Freiburg)
- (Germany) Lars Toborg (Rot Weiss Ahlen)

Source:www.kicker.de
