= Dimo Wache =

German footballer

Personal information
- Full name: Dimo André Wache
- Date of birth: 1 November 1973 (age 53)
- Place of birth: Brake, West Germany
- Height: 1.94 m (6 ft 4 in)
- Position: Goalkeeper

Youth career
- –1986: SC Ovelgönne
- 1986–1988: VfL Brake
- 1988–1990: VfB Oldenburg
- 1990–1992: Bayer Leverkusen

Senior career*
| Years | Team | Apps | (Gls) |
| 1992–1995 | Borussia M'gladbach | 0 | (0) |
| 1995–2010 | Mainz 05 | 374 | (0) |
| Total | | 374 | (0) |
- * Club domestic league appearances and goals

Dimo André Wache (born 1 November 1973 in Brake, Lower Saxony) is a German former professional footballer who played for 1. FSV Mainz 05 as a goalkeeper for fifteen years. He is one of three Mainz 05 honorary team captains.

== Career statistics ==
Appearances and goals by club, season and competition
| Club | Season | League | | | Cup | | Continental | | Total | |
| Club | Season | League | Apps | Goals | Apps | Goals | Apps | Goals | Apps | Goals |
|---|---|---|---|---|---|---|---|---|---|---|
| Borussia M'gladbach | 1992–93 | Bundesliga | 0 | 0 | 0 | 0 | — | | 0 | 0 |
| Borussia M'gladbach | 1993–94 | Bundesliga | 0 | 0 | 0 | 0 | — | | 0 | 0 |
| Borussia M'gladbach | 1994–95 | Bundesliga | 0 | 0 | 0 | 0 | — | | 0 | 0 |
| Borussia M'gladbach | Total | | 0 | 0 | 0 | 0 | — | | 0 | 0 |
| Mainz 05 | 1995–96 | 2. Bundesliga | 18 | 0 | 1 | 0 | — | | 19 | 0 |
| Mainz 05 | 1996–97 | 2. Bundesliga | 34 | 0 | 1 | 0 | — | | 35 | 0 |
| Mainz 05 | 1997–98 | 2. Bundesliga | 17 | 0 | 2 | 0 | — | | 19 | 0 |
| Mainz 05 | 1998–99 | 2. Bundesliga | 21 | 0 | 0 | 0 | — | | 21 | 0 |
| Mainz 05 | 1999–2000 | 2. Bundesliga | 34 | 0 | 4 | 0 | — | | 38 | 0 |
| Mainz 05 | 2000–01 | 2. Bundesliga | 31 | 0 | 2 | 0 | — | | 33 | 0 |
| Mainz 05 | 2001–02 | 2. Bundesliga | 34 | 0 | 3 | 0 | — | | 37 | 0 |
| Mainz 05 | 2002–03 | 2. Bundesliga | 34 | 0 | 0 | 0 | — | | 34 | 0 |
| Mainz 05 | 2003–04 | 2. Bundesliga | 34 | 0 | 1 | 0 | — | | 35 | 0 |
| Mainz 05 | 2004–05 | Bundesliga | 28 | 0 | 2 | 0 | — | | 30 | 0 |
| Mainz 05 | 2005–06 | Bundesliga | 20 | 0 | 3 | 0 | 6 | 0 | 29 | 0 |
| Mainz 05 | 2006–07 | Bundesliga | 26 | 0 | 1 | 0 | — | | 27 | 0 |
| Mainz 05 | 2007–08 | 2. Bundesliga | 9 | 0 | 1 | 0 | — | | 10 | 0 |
| Mainz 05 | 2008–09 | 2. Bundesliga | 34 | 0 | 5 | 0 | — | | 39 | 0 |
| Mainz 05 | 2009–10 | Bundesliga | 0 | 0 | 1 | 0 | — | | 0 | 0 |
| Mainz 05 | Total | | 374 | 0 | 27 | 0 | 6 | 0 | 407 | 0 |
| Career total | | | 374 | 0 | 27 | 1 | 6 | 0 | 407 | 0 |
