= Dieter Hecking =

German football manager (born 1964)

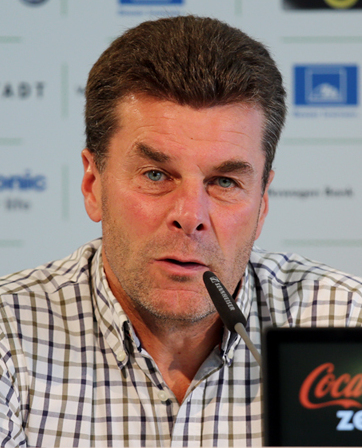
- Hecking in 2013

Personal information
- Full name: Dieter-Klaus Hecking
- Date of birth: 12 September 1964 (age 62)
- Place of birth: Castrop-Rauxel, West Germany
- Height: 1.79 m (5 ft 10 in)
- Position: Midfielder

Team information
- Current team: VfL Wolfsburg (Managing director sport)

Youth career
- Westfalia Soest
- Soester SV
- Borussia Lippstadt
- 1. FC Paderborn

Senior career*
Years	Team	Apps	(Gls)
1983–1985	Borussia Mönchengladbach	6	(0)
1985–1990	Hessen Kassel	168	(63)
1990–1992	Waldhof Mannheim	54	(14)
1992–1994	VfB Leipzig	61	(1)
1994–1996	TuS Paderborn-Neuhaus	71	(24)
1996–1999	Hannover 96	74	(22)
1999–2000	Eintracht Braunschweig	18	(5)
Total		452	(129)

International career
1985–1986	West Germany U21	12	(8)

Managerial career
- 2000–2001: SC Verl
- 2001–2004: VfB Lübeck
- 2004–2006: Alemannia Aachen
- 2006–2009: Hannover 96
- 2009–2012: 1. FC Nürnberg
- 2012–2016: VfL Wolfsburg
- 2016–2019: Borussia Mönchengladbach
- 2019–2020: Hamburger SV
- 2023: 1. FC Nürnberg
- 2024–2025: VfL Bochum
- 2026: VfL Wolfsburg
- * Club domestic league appearances and goals

Dieter-Klaus Hecking (pronounced [ˈdiːtɐ ˈhɛkɪŋ]; born 12 September 1964) is a German former professional football manager and player who is currently VfL Wolfsburg's managing director for sport.

A midfielder, he played for Hannover 96 and Eintracht Braunschweig. He returned to manage Hannover despite the long-standing and bitter rivalry between the two clubs.

== Managerial career ==
=== Early career (2000–2004) ===
On 1 July 2000, Hecking moved into management as he took over as manager at Regionalliga Nord outfit SC Verl. His first match was a 2–0 loss to Eintracht Braunschweig on 1 August 2000. However, Hecking's proclamations that he was seeking a new position irked the club to such an extent they fired him after just 20 games in charge. He was sacked on 31 January 2001. His final match was a 2–1 win to Tennis Borussia Berlin. Verl were in seventh place when Hecking was sacked.

Hecking wasn't free for long as another Regionalliga Nord side, VfB Lübeck, came calling on 27 March 2001. His first match was a 1–0 loss to Fortuna Düsseldorf on 30 March 2001. Hecking achieved a solid job in the remaining games, leaving the club in third place, just one short of promotion. This set the basis for the following season as the team claimed the title and moved up into the 2. Bundesliga. Hecking then managed to secure Lübeck an 11th place in the 2002–03 season.

The following season proved to have mixed results. Hecking led the club to the semi-finals of the DFB-Pokal, where they were eliminated by eventual double winners SV Werder Bremen after extra-time. After this, the team collapsed and was relegated with a 2–0 loss to SpVgg Greuther Fürth on the final day. Hecking rejected the club's offer to stay and he left the club on 25 May 2004.

=== Alemannia Aachen (2004–2006) ===
A week after leaving Lübeck, Alemannia Aachen sporting director Jörg Schmadtke announced that Hecking would replace departing coach Jörg Berger.

Hecking's first match was a 1–1 draw against Eintracht Frankfurt on 9 August 2004. During the 2004–05 season, Alemannia Aachen participated in the UEFA Cup, becoming the first ever 2. Bundesliga team to reach the third round, where they were eliminated by AZ Alkmaar. In the German Cup, Alemannia Aachen were eliminated in the second round by Bayern Munich. In the league, Alemannia Aachen finished in sixth place. The following season, Aachen finished second in the 2. Bundesliga and was promoted to the Bundesliga for the first time in 36 years.

Hecking's time guiding Alemannia Aachen in the top flight was short. Just three games in, he requested to be able to leave the club for his former club and fellow Bundesliga side Hannover 96 on 7 September 2006, to fill the vacancy left by their sacking of Peter Neururer. Ironically, the final straw for Neururer was a 0–3 home defeat to Hecking's Alemannia Aachen. Alemannia Aachen were in 14th place when Hecking left the club.

=== Hannover 96 (2006–2009) ===
Hecking became manager on 7 September 2006, officially taking the manager's job with immediate effect on 7 September 2006. However, caretaker manager Michael Schjönberg managed the DFB-Pokal match against Dynamo Dresden on 9 September 2006. Hannover paid compensation of nearly a million euros to get Hecking.

Hecking recovered Hannover from a dismal start that left them bottom at the time of his arrival. The team also achieved a good run through to the quarter finals of the cup, and finished comfortably in 11th place in the Bundesliga. During the following season, Hanover were knocked out of the German Cup in the second round by Schalke 04. Hannover improved on their league position by finishing in eighth place, their best finish in 43 years. In the summer, Hecking suggested that the team would aim for a UEFA Cup place in the following league season. Hannover started the 2008–09 season with a 5–0 cup win against Hallescher FC on 9 August 2008. They were eventually eliminated in the second round by Schalke, for the second consecutive year.

Hannover finished the 2008–09 season in 11th place. On 19 August 2009 Hecking resigned from his post after a disappointing 2008–09 season and a slow start to the 2009–10 season, including a loss to Eintracht Trier in the first round of the cup. Hecking's final match was a 1–1 draw against Mainz.

=== 1. FC Nürnberg (2009–2012) ===
On 22 December 2009, he was named as the new manager of 1. FC Nürnberg, replacing Michael Oenning. His first match was a 1–0 loss to Schalke on 17 January 2010. Nürnberg finished in 16th place and went into the relegation playoff. Nürnberg won both legs of the relegation playoff against Augsburg. During the 2010–11 season, Nürnberg reached the quarter-finals of the German Cup, where they were eliminated by Schalke. Nürnberg finished in sixth place in the league. They had finished one spot and 11 points behind Mainz for a Europa League spot. Nürnberg started the 2011–12 season with a 5–1 win against Arminia Bielefeld in the German Cup. They were eventually eliminated in the round of 16. Nürnberg finished in 10th place in the league. Hecking used a clause in his contract to leave the club. His final match was a 1–1 draw against Werder Bremen on 16 December 2012. Nürnberg were in 14th place when Hecking left the club. Hecking finished with a record of 42 wins, 23 draws, and 47 losses in 112 matches.

=== VfL Wolfsburg (2012–2016) ===
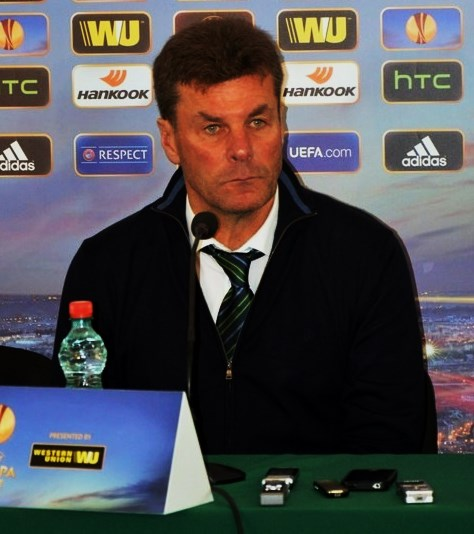
Hecking at a press conference with Wolfsburg in 2014

Hecking became manager of Wolfsburg on 22 December 2012. Wolfsburg were in 15th place, behind 1. FC Nürnberg, over the winter break.

He made his debut on 19 January 2013 in a 2–0 win against Stuttgart. Wolfsburg finished the season in 11th, only losing three times in the second half of the season, and also reaching the semi-final of the cup. In the 2013–14 season Wolfsburg again got to the semi-finals of the German Cup, this time losing to Borussia Dortmund. Wolfsburg finished the season in fifth place and won a spot in the Europa League.

Wolfsburg started the 2014–15 season with a 2–1 loss to Bayern Munich. However, in the reverse fixture, Wolfsburg won 4–1, their first game after the death of midfielder Junior Malanda. This victory was the first time Bayern had conceded four goals in a league game since Wolfsburg beat them 5–1 in 2009 on the way to the 2008–09 Bundesliga title.

In March 2015, in the Europa League, in the round of 16, Wolfsburg defeated Inter Milan by a 3–1 score in the first leg and 2–1 in the second leg for a 5–2 aggregate score. Wolfsburg were eliminated by Napoli. Wolfsburg finished the league season in second place, 10 points behind Bayern. The second-place finish qualified Wolfsburg for the Champions League. On 30 May 2015 Wolfsburg defeated Borussia Dortmund 3–1 in the German Cup final. This was Hecking's first major trophy. Hecking was then voted Football Manager of the Year for 2015, while Wolfsburg's star player Kevin De Bruyne won the Footballer of the Year award. Hecking was praised for developing De Bruyne and Wolfsburg's other key players Bas Dost and Ricardo Rodriguez.

Wolfsburg started the 2015–16 season by defeating Bayern Munich in a shootout to win the German Super Cup. In the Champions League, Wolfsburg won Group B, finishing two points above PSV Eindhoven. Wolfsburg beat Gent to reach the quarter-finals, where they lost to eventual winners Real Madrid despite 'stunning' the Spanish side with a 2–0 win in the first leg. However, the team struggled in the Bundesliga, producing the second-worst away record in the league and missed out on European football, finishing only eighth.

Wolfsburg sacked Hecking on 17 October 2016. Hecking's final match was a 1–0 loss to RB Leipzig. Wolfsburg were in 14th place when Wolfsburg sacked Hecking. Hecking finished with a record of 81 wins, 41 draws, and 43 losses in 165 matches.

=== Borussia Mönchengladbach (2016–2019) ===
On 21 December 2016, Hecking was appointed as the new head coach by Borussia Mönchengladbach on a contract until 2019, with the short-term goal of ensuring the club's Bundesliga survival. Hecking led Gladbach to a famous comeback victory against ACF Fiorentina in the Europa League, but were then eliminated by Schalke, and also lost the semi-final of the 2016–17 DFB-Pokal to Eintracht Frankfurt. The team finished 9th in both of Hecking's first two seasons at the Borussia-Park.

On 2 April 2019, Gladbach's sporting director Max Eberl announced that Hecking's term would not be extended beyond the end of the 2018–19 season. His final game was a 2–0 loss to Borussia Dortmund, which caused the club to drop outside the Champions League qualification places. Hecking finished with a record of 43 wins, 23 draws, and 32 losses.

=== Hamburger SV (2019–2020) ===
On 29 May 2019, Hecking signed a one-year contract to be the new manager of Hamburger SV, replacing Hannes Wolf. He departed by mutual consent on 4 July 2020, after failing to achieve the target of promotion to the Bundesliga. The season ended with a 5–1 home loss to SV Sandhausen, which was described as one of the lowest points in the club's history. He finished with a record of 14 wins, 13 draws, and nine losses.

=== Return to Nürnberg (2020–2024) ===
After leaving Hamburg, Hecking returned to 1. FC Nürnberg, replacing Robert Palikuča as sporting director.

In February 2023, he took the head coaching spot on interim until the end of the 2022–23 season after firing Markus Weinzierl. The club only secured survival in the 2. Bundesliga on the final day of the season, and some fans demanded that Hecking resign. Cristian Fiél replaced Hecking as coach after the season, having served as Hecking's assistant while he was interim coach.

=== VfL Bochum (2024–2025) ===
He was named head coach of VfL Bochum in November 2024. In May 2025, the club relegated in 18th place to 2. Bundesliga. After only one win in five games of the 2025–26 season, Hecking was sacked from his position.

=== Return to VfL Wolfsburg (2026) ===
In March 2026, he returned to Wolfsburg as the head coach.

Following Wolfsburg's 2–1 defeat in the relegation playoffs against Paderborn, Hecking retired from coaching to become the club's managing director sport.

== Managerial statistics ==
As of matches played 25 May 2026

Managerial record by team and tenure
Team	From	To	Record					Ref
Team	From	To	G	W	D	L	Win %	Ref
SC Verl	1 July 2000	31 January 2001	20	8	7	5	40.00	
VfB Lübeck	27 March 2001	25 May 2004	119	51	24	44	42.86	
Alemannia Aachen	1 June 2004	7 September 2006	83	42	14	27	50.60	
Hannover 96	7 September 2006	19 August 2009	109	39	30	40	35.78	
1. FC Nürnberg	22 December 2009	22 December 2012	112	42	23	47	37.50	
VfL Wolfsburg	22 December 2012	17 October 2016	165	81	41	43	49.09	
Borussia Mönchengladbach	21 December 2016	29 May 2019	98	43	23	32	43.88	
Hamburger SV	29 May 2019	4 July 2020	36	14	13	9	38.89	
1. FC Nürnberg	20 February 2023	30 June 2023	14	4	5	5	28.57	
VfL Bochum	4 November 2024	15 September 2025	31	8	6	17	25.81	
VfL Wolfsburg	9 March 2026	Present	11	2	4	5	18.18	
Total			798	334	190	274	41.85	—

== Honours ==
=== Manager ===
VfB Lübeck

- Regionalliga Nord: 2001–02 (Promotion to 2. Bundesliga)
- Schleswig-Holstein Cup: 2001

Alemannia Aachen

- 2. Bundesliga promotion: 2005–06

VfL Wolfsburg

- DFB-Pokal: 2014–15
- DFL-Supercup: 2015

=== Individual ===
- German Football Manager of the Year: 2015
- VDV Bundesliga Coach of the Season: 2014–15
