= 2009–10 Bundesliga =

47th season of the Bundesliga

Bundesliga
- Season: 2009–10
- Dates: 7 August 2009 – 8 May 2010
- Champions: Bayern Munich; 21st Bundesliga title 22nd German title
- Relegated: VfL Bochum; Hertha BSC
- Champions League: Bayern Munich; Schalke 04; Werder Bremen
- Europa League: Bayer Leverkusen; Borussia Dortmund; VfB Stuttgart
- Matches: 306
- Goals: 866 (2.83 per match)
- Top goalscorer: Edin Džeko (22)
- Biggest home win: Bayern 7–0 Hannover
- Biggest away win: Freiburg 0–6 Bremen
- Highest scoring: M'gladbach 5–3 Hannover
- Average attendance: 41,802

The 2009–10 Bundesliga was the 47th season of the Bundesliga, Germany's premier football league. The season commenced on 7 August 2009, with the traditional season-opening match involving the defending champions VfL Wolfsburg and VfB Stuttgart. The last games were played on 8 May 2010. There was a winter break between 21 December 2009 and 14 January 2010, though the period was reduced from six to three weeks. The season was overshadowed by the suicide of Hannover 96 captain and goalkeeper Robert Enke on 10 November 2009.

== Teams ==
Karlsruher SC and Arminia Bielefeld were directly relegated at the end of the 2008–09 season after finishing in the bottom two places of the table. Karlsruhe ended a two-year stint in Germany's top flight, while Arminia were relegated for the sixth time since the introduction of the Bundesliga, a current record, after five years.

The relegated teams were replaced by 2008–09 2. Bundesliga champions SC Freiburg and runners-up Mainz 05. Freiburg returned to the Bundesliga after four years, and Mainz began a second tenure in the top division after being relegated in the 2006–07 season.

A further place in the league was decided through a two-legged play-off. Energie Cottbus, as the 16th-placed Bundesliga team, had to face 1. FC Nürnberg, who finished third in 2. Bundesliga. Nürnberg won both matches by an aggregated score of 5–0 and thus earned their seventh promotion to the Bundesliga since its introduction, also a current record. Their opponents ended a second three-year top flight tenure and left the Bundesliga without a club from former East Germany for only the second time since East German teams were included before the 1991–92 season, with the other time being in 2005–06.

=== Stadia and locations ===
BayArena, home of Bayer Leverkusen, was expanded from 22,500 to 30,000 spectators during the first half of 2009. Other stadia which are recently undergoing renovation or expansion are Weserstadion in Bremen, HSH Nordbank Arena in Hamburg and Mercedes-Benz Arena in Stuttgart.

Locations of teams in the 2009–10 Bundesliga

Team	Location	Venue	Capacity
VfL Bochum	Bochum	rewirpowerSTADION	31,328
SV Werder Bremen	Bremen	Weserstadion^{1}	34,400
Borussia Dortmund	Dortmund	Westfalenstadion	80,552
Eintracht Frankfurt	Frankfurt am Main	Commerzbank-Arena	51,500
SC Freiburg	Freiburg	Badenova-Stadion	24,000
Hamburger SV	Hamburg	HSH Nordbank Arena^{2}	57,000
Hannover 96	Hanover	AWD-Arena	49,000
Hertha BSC	Berlin	Olympiastadion	74,244
TSG 1899 Hoffenheim	Sinsheim	Rhein-Neckar-Arena	30,150
1. FC Köln	Cologne	RheinEnergieStadion	50,000
Bayer 04 Leverkusen	Leverkusen	BayArena	30,210
1. FSV Mainz 05	Mainz	Stadion am Bruchweg	20,300
Borussia Mönchengladbach	Mönchengladbach	Borussia-Park	54,067
Bayern Munich	Munich	Allianz Arena	69,000
1. FC Nürnberg	Nuremberg	EasyCredit-Stadion	46,780
FC Schalke 04	Gelsenkirchen	Veltins-Arena	61,673
VfB Stuttgart	Stuttgart	Mercedes-Benz Arena^{3}	42,101
VfL Wolfsburg	Wolfsburg	Volkswagen Arena	30,000

Notes

1. Weserstadion will be increased in capacity during the season.
2. HSH Nordbank Arena will be expanded to a capacity of 61,000 from January 2010.
3. Mercedes-Benz Arena will be converted to a football-only stadium during the 2009–10 and 2010–11 seasons. As a consequence, the usual capacity of 58,000 is currently reduced to 42,101.

=== Personnel and sponsoring ===
Team	Head coach	Team captain	Kitmaker	Shirt sponsor
Bayer 04 Leverkusen	(Germany) Jupp Heynckes	(Germany) Simon Rolfes	Adidas	TelDaFax
FC Bayern Munich	(Netherlands) Louis van Gaal	(Netherlands) Mark van Bommel	Adidas	T-Home
VfL Bochum	(Germany) Dariusz Wosz (Interim)	(Germany) Marcel Maltritz	Do You Football	Netto
Borussia Dortmund	(Germany) Jürgen Klopp	(Germany) Sebastian Kehl	Kappa	Evonik
Eintracht Frankfurt	(Germany) Michael Skibbe	(Switzerland) Christoph Spycher	Jako	Fraport
SC Freiburg	(Germany) Robin Dutt	(Germany) Heiko Butscher	Nike	Duravit
Hamburger SV	(Netherlands) Ricardo Moniz (Interim)	(Czech Republic) David Jarolím	Adidas	Emirates
Hannover 96	(Germany) Mirko Slomka	(Netherlands) Arnold Bruggink	Under Armour	TUI
Hertha BSC	(Germany) Friedhelm Funkel	(Germany) Arne Friedrich	Nike	Deutsche Bahn
TSG 1899 Hoffenheim	(Germany) Ralf Rangnick	(Sweden) Per Nilsson	Puma	TV Digital
1. FC Köln	(Croatia) Zvonimir Soldo	(Lebanon) Youssef Mohamad	Reebok	REWE
1. FSV Mainz 05	(Germany) Thomas Tuchel	(Germany) Tim Hoogland	Nike	Entega
Borussia Mönchengladbach	(Germany) Michael Frontzeck	(Belgium) Filip Daems	Lotto	Postbank
1. FC Nürnberg	(Germany) Dieter Hecking	(Germany) Andreas Wolf	Adidas	Areva
FC Schalke 04	(Germany) Felix Magath	(Germany) Heiko Westermann	Adidas	Gazprom
VfB Stuttgart	(Switzerland) Christian Gross	(France) Matthieu Delpierre	Puma	EnBW
SV Werder Bremen	(Germany) Thomas Schaaf	(Germany) Torsten Frings	Nike	Targobank
VfL Wolfsburg	(Germany) Lorenz-Günther Köstner	(Brazil) Josué	Adidas	Volkswagen

=== Managerial changes ===
Eight teams underwent coaching changes during the off-season, among them champions VfL Wolfsburg and runners-up Bayern Munich. Christoph Daum made use of a unilateral contract option to terminate his contract at 1. FC Köln.

Team	Outgoing manager(s)	Manner of departure	Date of vacancy	Position in table	Replaced by	Date of appointment
Eintracht Frankfurt	(Germany) Friedhelm Funkel	Resigned	21 May 2009	off-season	(Germany) Michael Skibbe	1 July 2009
Hamburger SV	(Netherlands) Martin Jol	Ajax purchased rights	26 May 2009	off-season	(Germany) Bruno Labbadia	1 July 2009
Borussia Mönchengladbach	(Germany) Hans Meyer	Retired	28 May 2009	off-season	(Germany) Michael Frontzeck	1 July 2009
1. FC Köln	(Germany) Christoph Daum	Contract terminated	2 June 2009	off-season	(Croatia) Zvonimir Soldo	1 July 2009
Bayer Leverkusen	(Germany) Bruno Labbadia	Hamburg purchased rights	5 June 2009	off-season	(Germany) Jupp Heynckes	1 July 2009
Bayern Munich	(Germany) Jupp Heynckes	End of caretaker contract	30 June 2009	off-season	(Netherlands) Louis van Gaal	1 July 2009
Schalke 04	(Germany) Mike Büskens, (Netherlands) Youri Mulder & (Germany) Oliver Reck	End of tenure as caretakers	30 June 2009	off-season	(Germany) Felix Magath	1 July 2009
VfL Wolfsburg	(Germany) Felix Magath	End of contract	30 June 2009	off-season	(Germany) Armin Veh	1 July 2009
Mainz 05	(Norway) Jørn Andersen	Sacked	3 August 2009	pre-season	(Germany) Thomas Tuchel	3 August 2009
Hannover 96	(Germany) Dieter Hecking	Resigned	19 August 2009	14th	(Germany) Andreas Bergmann	30 August 2009
VfL Bochum	(Switzerland) Marcel Koller	Sacked	20 September 2009	17th	(Germany) Frank Heinemann (caretaker)	20 September 2009
Hertha BSC	(Switzerland) Lucien Favre	Sacked	28 September 2009	18th	(Germany) Friedhelm Funkel	3 October 2009
VfL Bochum	(Germany) Frank Heinemann (caretaker)	End as caretaker	27 October 2009	17th	(Germany) Heiko Herrlich	27 October 2009
VfB Stuttgart	(Germany) Markus Babbel	Sacked	6 December 2009	16th	(Switzerland) Christian Gross	6 December 2009
1. FC Nürnberg	(Germany) Michael Oenning	Sacked	21 December 2009	17th	(Germany) Dieter Hecking	22 December 2009
Hannover 96	(Germany) Andreas Bergmann	Sacked	19 January 2010	16th	(Germany) Mirko Slomka	19 January 2010
VfL Wolfsburg	(Germany) Armin Veh	Sacked	25 January 2010	10th	(Germany) Lorenz-Günther Köstner	25 January 2010
Hamburger SV	(Germany) Bruno Labbadia	Sacked	26 April 2010	7th	(Netherlands) Ricardo Moniz (Interim)	26 April 2010
VfL Bochum	(Germany) Heiko Herrlich	Sacked	29 April 2010	16th	(Germany) Dariusz Wosz (Interim)	29 April 2010

== League table ==
Pos	Team	Pld	W	D	L	GF	GA	GD	Pts	Qualification or relegation
1	Bayern Munich (C)	34	20	10	4	72	31	+41	70	Qualification to Champions League group stage
2	Schalke 04	34	19	8	7	53	31	+22	65	Qualification to Champions League group stage
3	Werder Bremen	34	17	10	7	71	40	+31	61	Qualification to Champions League play-off round
4	Bayer Leverkusen	34	15	14	5	65	38	+27	59	Qualification to Europa League play-off round
5	Borussia Dortmund	34	16	9	9	54	42	+12	57	Qualification to Europa League play-off round
6	VfB Stuttgart	34	15	10	9	51	41	+10	55	Qualification to Europa League third qualifying round (Note: Since both finalists of the 2009–10 DFB-Pokal were qualified for the 2010–11 UEFA Champions League, the 6th-placed team will qualify for the 3rd qualifying round of the 2010–11 UEFA Europa League.)
7	Hamburger SV	34	13	13	8	56	41	+15	52	
8	VfL Wolfsburg	34	14	8	12	64	58	+6	50	
9	Mainz 05	34	12	11	11	36	42	−6	47	
10	Eintracht Frankfurt	34	12	10	12	47	54	−7	46	
11	1899 Hoffenheim	34	11	9	14	44	42	+2	42	
12	Borussia Mönchengladbach	34	10	9	15	43	60	−17	39	
13	1. FC Köln	34	9	11	14	33	42	−9	38	
14	SC Freiburg	34	9	8	17	35	59	−24	35	
15	Hannover 96	34	9	6	19	43	67	−24	33	
16	1. FC Nürnberg (O)	34	8	7	19	32	58	−26	31	Qualification to relegation play-offs
17	VfL Bochum (R)	34	6	10	18	33	64	−31	28	Relegation to 2. Bundesliga
18	Hertha BSC (R)	34	5	9	20	34	56	−22	24	Relegation to 2. Bundesliga

Source: kicker.de (in German)
Rules for classification: 1) points; 2) goal difference; 3) number of goals scored.
(C) Champions; (O) Play-off winners; (R) Relegated

== Results ==
Home \ Away	BSC	BOC	SVW	BVB	SGE	SCF	HSV	H96	TSG	KOE	B04	M05	BMG	FCB	FCN	S04	VFB	WOB
Hertha BSC	—	0–0	2–3	0–0	1–3	0–4	1–3	1–0	0–2	0–1	2–2	1–1	0–0	1–3	1–2	0–1	0–1	0–0
VfL Bochum	1–0	—	1–4	1–4	1–2	1–2	1–2	0–3	2–1	0–0	1–1	2–3	3–3	1–5	0–0	2–2	0–2	1–1
Werder Bremen	2–1	3–2	—	1–1	2–3	4–0	1–1	0–0	2–0	1–0	2–2	3–0	3–0	2–3	4–2	0–2	2–2	2–2
Borussia Dortmund	2–0	2–0	2–1	—	2–3	1–0	1–0	4–1	1–1	1–0	3–0	0–0	3–0	1–5	4–0	0–1	1–1	1–1
Eintracht Frankfurt	2–2	2–1	1–0	1–1	—	2–1	1–1	2–1	1–2	1–2	3–2	2–0	1–2	2–1	1–1	1–4	0–3	2–2
SC Freiburg	0–3	1–1	0–6	3–1	0–2	—	1–1	1–2	0–1	0–0	0–5	1–0	3–0	1–2	2–1	0–0	0–1	1–0
Hamburger SV	1–0	0–1	2–1	4–1	0–0	2–0	—	0–0	0–0	3–1	0–0	0–1	2–3	1–0	4–0	2–2	3–1	1–1
Hannover 96	0–3	2–3	1–5	1–1	2–1	5–2	2–2	—	0–1	1–4	0–0	1–1	6–1	0–3	1–3	4–2	1–0	0–1
1899 Hoffenheim	5–1	3–0	0–1	1–2	1–1	1–1	5–1	2–1	—	0–2	0–3	0–1	2–2	1–1	3–0	0–0	1–1	1–2
1. FC Köln	0–3	2–0	0–0	2–3	0–0	2–2	3–3	0–1	0–4	—	0–1	1–0	1–1	1–1	3–0	1–2	1–5	1–3
Bayer Leverkusen	1–1	2–1	0–0	1–1	4–0	3–1	4–2	3–0	1–0	0–0	—	4–2	3–2	1–1	4–0	0–2	4–0	2–1
Mainz 05	2–1	0–0	1–2	1–0	3–3	3–0	1–1	1–0	2–1	1–0	2–2	—	1–0	2–1	1–0	0–0	1–1	0–2
Borussia Mönchengladbach	2–1	1–2	4–3	0–1	2–0	1–1	1–0	5–3	2–4	0–0	1–1	2–0	—	1–1	2–1	1–0	0–0	0–4
Bayern Munich	5–2	3–1	1–1	3–1	2–1	2–1	1–0	7–0	2–0	0–0	1–1	3–0	2–1	—	2–1	1–1	1–2	3–0
1. FC Nürnberg	3–0	0–1	2–2	2–3	1–1	0–1	0–4	0–2	0–0	1–0	3–2	2–0	1–0	1–1	—	1–2	1–2	0–2
Schalke 04	2–0	3–0	0–2	2–1	2–0	0–1	3–3	2–0	2–0	2–0	2–2	1–0	3–1	1–2	1–0	—	2–1	1–2
VfB Stuttgart	1–1	1–1	0–2	4–1	2–1	4–2	1–3	2–0	3–1	0–2	2–1	2–2	2–1	0–0	0–0	1–2	—	3–1
VfL Wolfsburg	1–5	4–1	2–4	1–3	3–1	2–2	2–4	4–2	4–0	2–3	2–3	3–3	2–1	1–3	2–3	2–1	2–0	—

Source: DFB
Legend: Blue = home team win; Yellow = draw; Red = away team win.

== Promotion/relegation play-offs ==
16th-placed Bundesliga team 1. FC Nürnberg faced third-placed 2. Bundesliga team FC Augsburg for a two-legged play-off. The winner on aggregate score after both matches earned a spot in the 2010–11 Bundesliga. Nürnberg was participating in their second playoff in a row after winning promotion at the expense of Energie Cottbus in the playoff at the end of the 2008–09 season. The matches took place on 13 and 16 May, with Nürnberg playing at home first. Nürnberg won 3–0 on aggregate, thus retaining their spot in the Bundesliga for the next season.

13 May 2010
20:30 CEST

1. FC Nürnberg	1–0	FC Augsburg
Eigler 84'	Report (in German)

EasyCredit-Stadion, Nuremberg
Attendance: 40,509
Referee: Babak Rafati (Hanover)

16 May 2010
18:00 CEST

FC Augsburg	0–2	1. FC Nürnberg
Traoré (red card) 56'	Report (in German)	Gündoğan 34'; Choupo-Moting 63' (pen.)

Impuls Arena, Augsburg
Attendance: 30,660
Referee: Manuel Gräfe (Berlin)

Nürnberg won 3 – 0 on aggregate.

== Statistics ==
Including matches played on 8 May 2010

=== Top scorers ===
Source: kicker.de

Rank	Player	Club	Goals
1	(Bosnia and Herzegovina) Edin Džeko	VfL Wolfsburg	22
2	(Germany) Stefan Kießling	Bayer Leverkusen	21
3	(Paraguay) Lucas Barrios	Borussia Dortmund	19
4	(Germany) Kevin Kurányi	Schalke 04	18
5	(Peru) Claudio Pizarro	Werder Bremen	16
5	(Netherlands) Arjen Robben	Bayern Munich	16
7	(Germany) Cacau	VfB Stuttgart	13
7	(Germany) Thomas Müller	Bayern Munich	13
9	(Bosnia and Herzegovina) Vedad Ibišević	1899 Hoffenheim	12
9	(Switzerland) Albert Bunjaku	1. FC Nürnberg	12
9	(Switzerland) Eren Derdiyok	Bayer Leverkusen	12

== Awards ==
=== Player of the Month ===
Month	Player	Team
August	(Germany) Stefan Kießling	Bayer Leverkusen
September	(Germany) Thomas Müller	Bayern Munich
October	(Paraguay) Lucas Barrios	Borussia Dortmund
November	(Germany) Mesut Özil	Werder Bremen
December	(Germany) Toni Kroos	Bayer Leverkusen
January	(Germany) Toni Kroos	Bayer Leverkusen
February	(Germany) Cacau	VfB Stuttgart
March	(Germany) Marko Marin	Werder Bremen
April	(Germany) Torsten Frings	Werder Bremen

=== Team of the Season ===
Team of the Season
Goalkeeper	(Germany) Hans-Jörg Butt (Bayern Munich)		
Defenders	(Brazil) Naldo (Werder Bremen)	(Finland) Sami Hyypiä (Bayer Leverkusen)	(Germany) Mats Hummels (Borussia Dortmund)
Midfielders	(Germany) Marko Marin (Werder Bremen)	(Germany) Toni Kroos (Bayer Leverkusen)	(Netherlands) Arjen Robben (Bayern Munich)
Forwards	(Germany) Kevin Kurányi (Schalke 04)	(Germany) Stefan Kießling (Bayer Leverkusen)	(Bosnia and Herzegovina) Edin Džeko (VfL Wolfsburg)

== Attendances ==
No.	Team	Matches	Total	Average
1	Borussia Dortmund	17	1,313,178	77,246
2	Bayern München	17	1,173,000	69,000
3	Schalke 04	17	1,042,368	61,316
4	Hamburger SV	17	939,108	55,242
5	1. FC Köln	17	817,000	48,059
6	Eintracht Frankfurt	17	801,900	47,171
7	Hertha BSC	17	793,576	46,681
8	Borussia Mönchengladbach	17	788,983	46,411
9	1. FC Nürnberg	17	719,705	42,336
10	VfB Stuttgart	17	698,100	41,065
11	Hannover 96	17	650,206	38,247
12	Werder Bremen	17	612,254	36,015
13	1899 Hoffenheim	17	504,700	29,688
14	Bayer Leverkusen	17	498,217	29,307
15	VfL Wolfsburg	17	496,950	29,232
16	VfL Bochum	17	421,876	24,816
17	SC Freiburg	17	389,300	22,900
18	Mainz 05	17	341,450	20,085
