= 2008–09 Bundesliga =

46th season of the Bundesliga

Bundesliga
- Season: 2008–09
- Dates: 15 August 2008 – 23 May 2009
- Champions: VfL Wolfsburg; 1st Bundesliga title 1st German title
- Relegated: Energie Cottbus (via play-off); Karlsruher SC; Arminia Bielefeld
- Champions League: VfL Wolfsburg; Bayern Munich; VfB Stuttgart
- Europa League: Hertha BSC; Hamburger SV; Werder Bremen (via domestic cup)
- Matches: 306
- Goals: 894 (2.92 per match)
- Top goalscorer: Grafite (28)
- Biggest home win: Dortmund 6–0 Bielefeld (16 May 2009)
- Biggest away win: Frankfurt 0–5 Bremen (13 May 2009); Hannover 0–5 Wolfsburg (16 May 2009)
- Highest scoring: Bremen 5–4 Hoffenheim (27 September 2008) (9 goals)
- Average attendance: 42,565

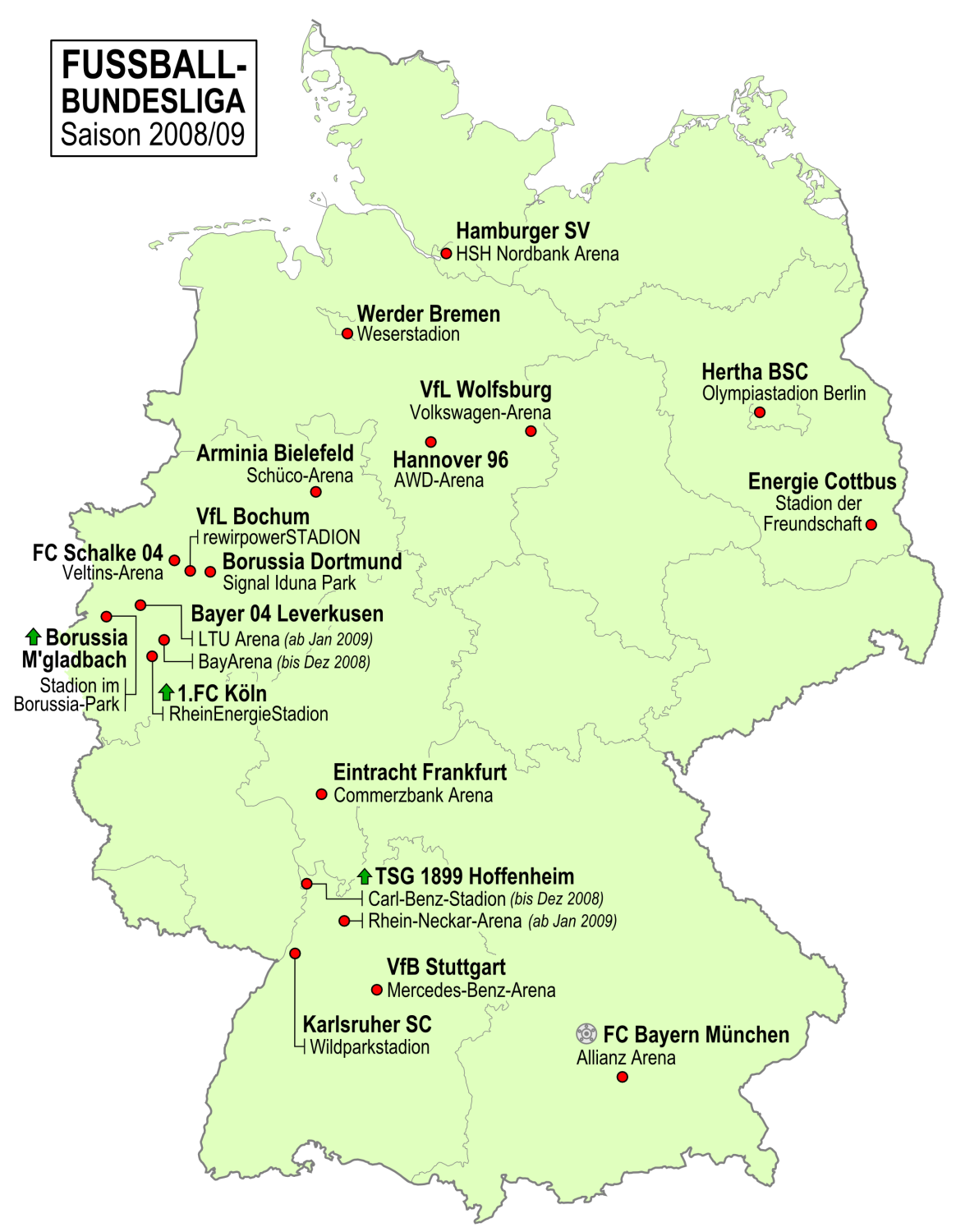
Fussball-Bundesliga Deutschland 2008-09

The 2008–09 Bundesliga was the 46th season of the Bundesliga, Germany's premier football league. The season began on 15 August 2008 with a 2–2 draw between defending champions Bayern Munich and Hamburger SV and ended with the last matches on 23 May 2009. VfL Wolfsburg secured their first national title in the last match after a 5–1 win at home against Werder Bremen.

== Changes from 2007–08 ==
=== Structural changes ===
Starting with the 2008–09 season, two-legged relegation playoffs between the third last team of the Bundesliga and the third team of the 2. Bundesliga at the end of the regular season were re-introduced.

Due to the restructuring of European competitions, the third-placed team qualified for the 2009–10 UEFA Champions League, entering in a separate qualifying round for non-champions. The fourth-placed team and the winner of the 2008–09 DFB-Pokal qualified for the 2009–10 UEFA Europa League play-off round; the fifth-placed team qualified for the third qualifying round. The sixth-placed team did not qualify for any European competitions because the UEFA Intertoto Cup was not continued after its final edition in 2008.

=== Promotion and relegation ===
1. FC Nürnberg, Hansa Rostock and MSV Duisburg finished the 2007–08 season in 16th through 18th place, respectively, and therefore were relegated to the 2. Bundesliga. They were replaced by the top three teams of 2007–08 2. Bundesliga: Borussia Mönchengladbach, 1899 Hoffenheim and 1. FC Köln, respectively.

== Teams ==
=== Stadia and locations ===
Location of teams in the 2008–09 Fußball-Bundesliga

Team	Location	Venue	Capacity
Hertha BSC	Berlin	Olympic Stadium	74,228
Arminia Bielefeld	Bielefeld	Bielefelder Alm	28,008
VfL Bochum	Bochum	rewirpowerSTADION	31,328
Werder Bremen	Bremen	Weserstadion	42,358
Energie Cottbus	Cottbus	Stadion der Freundschaft	22,450
Borussia Dortmund	Dortmund	Westfalenstadion	80,708
Eintracht Frankfurt	Frankfurt	Commerzbank-Arena	52,300
Hamburger SV	Hamburg	HSH Nordbank Arena	57,274
Hannover 96	Hanover	AWD-Arena	49,000
1899 Hoffenheim	Sinsheim	Rhein-Neckar-Arena^{1}	30,000
Karlsruher SC	Karlsruhe	Wildparkstadion	32,306
1. FC Köln	Cologne	RheinEnergieStadion	50,374
Bayer Leverkusen	Leverkusen	BayArena^{2}	22,500
Borussia Mönchengladbach	Mönchengladbach	Borussia-Park	54,067
Bayern Munich	Munich	Allianz Arena	69,901
Schalke 04	Gelsenkirchen	Veltins-Arena	61,673
VfB Stuttgart	Stuttgart	Mercedes-Benz Arena	58,000
VfL Wolfsburg	Wolfsburg	Volkswagen Arena	30,122

Notes

1. 1899 Hoffenheim played their 2008 home matches at Carl-Benz-Stadion in Mannheim because their Rhein-Neckar-Arena had not yet been completed.
2. Bayer Leverkusen played their 2009 home matches at LTU-Arena in Düsseldorf because their BayArena was being upgraded to a capacity of 30,000.

=== Personnel and sponsoring ===
Team	Head Coach	Team Captain	Kitmaker	Shirt sponsor
Hertha BSC	(Switzerland) Lucien Favre	(Germany) Arne Friedrich	Nike	Deutsche Bahn
Arminia Bielefeld	(Germany) Jörg Berger	(Germany) Rüdiger Kauf	Saller	Krombacher
VfL Bochum	(Switzerland) Marcel Koller	(Germany) Marcel Maltritz	Do You Football	KiK
Werder Bremen	(Germany) Thomas Schaaf	(Germany) Frank Baumann	Kappa	Citibank
Energie Cottbus	(Slovenia) Bojan Prašnikar	(Germany) Timo Rost	Saller	enviaM
Borussia Dortmund	(Germany) Jürgen Klopp	(Germany) Sebastian Kehl	Nike	Evonik
Eintracht Frankfurt	(Germany) Friedhelm Funkel	(Greece) Ioannis Amanatidis	Jako	Fraport
Hamburger SV	(Netherlands) Martin Jol	(Czech Republic) David Jarolím	adidas	Emirates
Hannover 96	(Germany) Dieter Hecking	(Germany) Robert Enke	Under Armour	TUI
1899 Hoffenheim	(Germany) Ralf Rangnick	(Germany) Selim Teber	Puma	TV Digital
Karlsruher SC	(Germany) Edmund Becker	(Germany) Maik Franz	Jako	EnBW
1. FC Köln	(Germany) Christoph Daum	(Slovenia) Milivoje Novaković	Reebok	REWE
Bayer Leverkusen	(Germany) Bruno Labbadia	(Germany) Simon Rolfes	adidas	TelDaFax
Borussia Mönchengladbach	(Germany) Hans Meyer	(Belgium) Filip Daems	Lotto	Kyocera
Bayern Munich	(Germany) Jupp Heynckes^{1}	(Netherlands) Mark van Bommel	adidas	T-Home
Schalke 04	(Germany) Mike Büskens, (Netherlands) Youri Mulder and (Germany) Oliver Reck^{2}	(Serbia) Mladen Krstajić	adidas	Gazprom
VfB Stuttgart	(Germany) Markus Babbel	(Germany) Thomas Hitzlsperger	Puma	EnBW
VfL Wolfsburg	(Germany) Felix Magath	(Brazil) Josué	Nike	Ein Herz Für Kinder*/Polo

Notes

1. Jupp Heynckes acted as caretaker for the remainder of the season.
2. Mike Büskens, Youri Mulder and Oliver Reck acted as caretakers for the remainder of the season.
- Ein Herz Für Kinder took the place of Volkswagen's sponsorship during the 2008–09 season to celebrate the 20th year of the Charity.

=== Managerial changes ===
Team	Outgoing manager	Manner of departure	Date of vacancy	Replaced by	Date of appointment	Position in table
Bayer Leverkusen	(Germany) Michael Skibbe	Sacked	30 June 2008	(Germany) Bruno Labbadia	1 July 2008	Pre-season
Bayern Munich	(Germany) Ottmar Hitzfeld	End of contract	30 June 2008	(Germany) Jürgen Klinsmann	1 July 2008	Pre-season
Borussia Dortmund	(Germany) Thomas Doll	Resigned	30 June 2008	(Germany) Jürgen Klopp	1 July 2008	Pre-season
Hamburger SV	(Netherlands) Huub Stevens	End of contract	30 June 2008	(Netherlands) Martin Jol	1 July 2008	Pre-season
Schalke 04	(Germany) Mike Büskens & (Netherlands) Youri Mulder	Stepped down to assistant position	30 June 2008	(Netherlands) Fred Rutten	1 July 2008	Pre-season
Borussia Mönchengladbach	(Netherlands) Jos Luhukay	Sacked	5 October 2008	(Germany) Hans Meyer	18 October 2008	18th
VfB Stuttgart	(Germany) Armin Veh	Sacked	23 November 2008	(Germany) Markus Babbel	23 November 2008	11th
Schalke 04	(Netherlands) Fred Rutten	Sacked	26 March 2009	(Germany) Mike Büskens, (Netherlands) Youri Mulder and (Germany) Oliver Reck	1 April 2009	8th
Bayern Munich	(Germany) Jürgen Klinsmann	Sacked	27 April 2009	(Germany) Jupp Heynckes	27 April 2009	3rd
Arminia Bielefeld	(Germany) Michael Frontzeck	Sacked	17 May 2009	(Germany) Jörg Berger	19 May 2009	16th

== League table ==
Pos	Team	Pld	W	D	L	GF	GA	GD	Pts	Qualification or relegation
1	VfL Wolfsburg (C)	34	21	6	7	80	41	+39	69	Qualification to Champions League group stage
2	Bayern Munich	34	20	7	7	71	42	+29	67	Qualification to Champions League group stage
3	VfB Stuttgart	34	19	7	8	63	43	+20	64	Qualification to Champions League play-off round
4	Hertha BSC	34	19	6	9	48	41	+7	63	Qualification to Europa League play-off round
5	Hamburger SV	34	19	4	11	49	47	+2	61	Qualification to Europa League third qualifying round
6	Borussia Dortmund	34	15	14	5	60	37	+23	59	
7	1899 Hoffenheim	34	15	10	9	63	49	+14	55	
8	Schalke 04	34	14	8	12	47	35	+12	50	
9	Bayer Leverkusen	34	14	7	13	59	46	+13	49	
10	Werder Bremen (Note: Werder Bremen qualified for the play-off round of the UEFA Europa League by winning the 2008–09 DFB-Pokal.)	34	12	9	13	64	50	+14	45	Qualification to Europa League play-off round
11	Hannover 96	34	10	10	14	49	69	−20	40	
12	1. FC Köln	34	11	6	17	35	50	−15	39	
13	Eintracht Frankfurt	34	8	9	17	39	60	−21	33	
14	VfL Bochum	34	7	11	16	39	55	−16	32	
15	Borussia Mönchengladbach	34	8	7	19	39	62	−23	31	
16	Energie Cottbus (R)	34	8	6	20	30	57	−27	30	Qualification to relegation play-offs
17	Karlsruher SC (R)	34	8	5	21	30	54	−24	29	Relegation to 2. Bundesliga
18	Arminia Bielefeld (R)	34	4	16	14	29	56	−27	28	Relegation to 2. Bundesliga

Source: kicker (in German)
Rules for classification: 1) points; 2) goal difference; 3) number of goals scored.
(C) Champions; (R) Relegated

== Results ==
Home \ Away	BSC	DSC	BOC	SVW	FCE	BVB	SGE	HSV	H96	TSG	KSC	KOE	B04	BMG	FCB	S04	VFB	WOB
Hertha BSC	—	1–1	2–0	2–1	0–1	1–3	2–1	2–1	3–0	1–0	4–0	2–1	1–0	2–1	2–1	0–0	2–1	2–2
Arminia Bielefeld	1–1	—	1–1	2–2	1–1	0–0	0–0	2–4	2–2	0–2	1–2	2–0	2–1	0–2	0–1	0–2	2–2	0–3
VfL Bochum	2–3	2–0	—	0–0	3–2	0–2	2–0	1–1	0–2	1–3	2–0	1–2	2–3	2–2	0–3	2–1	1–2	2–2
Werder Bremen	5–1	1–2	3–2	—	3–0	3–3	5–0	2–0	4–1	5–4	1–3	3–1	0–2	1–1	0–0	1–1	4–0	2–1
Energie Cottbus	1–3	2–1	1–1	2–1	—	0–1	2–3	1–2	3–1	0–3	1–0	0–2	3–0	0–1	1–3	0–2	0–3	2–0
Borussia Dortmund	1–1	6–0	1–1	1–0	1–1	—	4–0	2–0	1–1	0–0	4–0	3–1	1–1	2–1	1–1	3–3	3–0	0–0
Eintracht Frankfurt	0–2	1–1	4–0	0–5	2–1	0–2	—	2–3	4–0	1–1	2–1	2–2	0–2	4–1	1–2	1–2	2–2	0–2
Hamburger SV	1–1	2–0	3–1	2–1	2–0	2–1	1–0	—	2–1	1–0	2–1	0–1	3–2	1–0	1–0	1–1	2–0	1–3
Hannover 96	2–0	1–1	1–1	1–1	0–0	4–4	1–1	3–0	—	2–5	3–2	2–1	1–0	5–1	1–0	1–0	3–3	0–5
1899 Hoffenheim	0–1	3–0	0–3	0–0	2–0	4–1	2–1	3–0	2–2	—	4–1	2–0	1–4	1–0	2–2	1–1	0–0	3–2
Karlsruher SC	4–0	0–1	1–0	1–0	0–0	0–1	0–1	3–2	2–3	2–2	—	0–2	3–3	0–0	0–1	0–3	0–2	2–1
1. FC Köln	1–2	1–1	1–1	1–0	1–0	0–1	1–1	1–2	2–1	1–3	0–0	—	0–2	2–4	0–3	1–0	0–3	1–1
Bayer Leverkusen	0–1	2–2	1–1	1–1	1–1	2–3	1–1	1–2	4–0	5–2	0–1	2–0	—	5–0	0–2	2–1	2–4	2–0
Borussia Mönchengladbach	0–1	1–1	0–1	3–2	1–3	1–1	1–2	4–1	3–2	1–1	1–0	1–2	1–3	—	2–2	1–0	1–3	1–2
Bayern Munich	4–1	3–1	3–3	2–5	4–1	3–1	4–0	2–2	5–1	2–1	1–0	1–2	3–0	2–1	—	0–1	2–1	4–2
Schalke 04	1–0	0–0	1–0	1–0	4–0	1–1	1–0	1–2	3–0	2–3	2–0	1–0	1–2	3–1	1–2	—	1–2	2–2
VfB Stuttgart	2–0	0–0	2–0	4–1	2–0	2–1	2–0	1–0	2–0	3–3	3–1	1–3	0–2	2–0	2–2	2–0	—	4–1
VfL Wolfsburg	2–1	4–1	2–0	5–1	3–0	3–0	2–2	3–0	2–1	4–0	1–0	2–1	2–1	3–0	5–1	4–3	4–1	—

Source: DFB
Legend: Blue = home team win; Yellow = draw; Red = away team win.

== Promotion/relegation play-offs ==
Energie Cottbus, as the 16th-placed team, faced third-placed 2. Bundesliga team 1. FC Nürnberg for a two-legged playoff. Nürnberg won both matches on an aggregated score of 5–0 and thus secured promotion to the 2009–10 Bundesliga, while Cottbus were relegated to the 2009–10 2. Bundesliga.

After Energie were relegated, no teams from the former East Germany played in the Bundesliga until RB Leipzig earned promotion to the Bundesliga for 2016–17.

28 May 2009
18:00 CEST

Energie Cottbus	0–3	1. FC Nürnberg
	Report (in German)	Boakye 13', 89'; Eigler 56'

Stadion der Freundschaft, Cottbus
Attendance: 22,000 (capacity crowd)
Referee: Florian Meyer (Braunschweig)

31 May 2009
15:30 CEST

1. FC Nürnberg	2–0	Energie Cottbus
Eigler 29'; Mintál 37'	Report (in German)

Frankenstadion, Nuremberg
Attendance: 46,780 (capacity crowd)
Referee: Thorsten Kinhöfer (Herne)

== Statistics ==
=== Top goalscorers ===
Source: kicker.de (in German)

Rank	Player	Club	Goals
1	(Brazil) Grafite	VfL Wolfsburg	28
2	(Bosnia and Herzegovina) Edin Džeko	VfL Wolfsburg	26
3	(Germany) Mario Gómez	VfB Stuttgart	24
4	(Germany) Patrick Helmes	Bayer Leverkusen	21
5	(Bosnia and Herzegovina) Vedad Ibišević	1899 Hoffenheim	18
6	(Peru) Claudio Pizarro	Werder Bremen	17
7	(Slovenia) Milivoje Novaković	1. FC Köln	16
8	(Senegal) Demba Ba	1899 Hoffenheim	14
8	(Italy) Luca Toni	Bayern Munich	14
10	(Germany) Kevin Kurányi	Schalke 04	13
10	(Poland) Artur Wichniarek	Arminia Bielefeld	13

== Awards ==
=== Player of the Month ===
Month	Player	Team
August	(Poland) Artur Wichniarek	Arminia Bielefeld
September	(Germany) Mesut Özil	Werder Bremen
October	(Bosnia and Herzegovina) Vedad Ibišević	1899 Hoffenheim
November	(France) Franck Ribéry	Bayern Munich
December	(Germany) Sami Khedira	VfB Stuttgart
February	(Germany) Mario Gómez	VfB Stuttgart
March	(Brazil) Grafite	VfL Wolfsburg
April	(Germany) Mario Gómez	VfB Stuttgart
May	(Germany) Mario Gómez	VfB Stuttgart

=== Annual awards ===
Award	Winner	Club
Footballer of the Year	(Brazil) Grafite	VfL Wolfsburg
Top Scorer	(Brazil) Grafite	VfL Wolfsburg

Team of the Season
Goalkeeper	(Germany) Dennis Eilhoff (Arminia Bielefeld)			
Defence	(Croatia) Josip Šimunić (Hertha BSC)		(Germany) Philipp Lahm (Bayern Munich)	(Germany) Heiko Westermann (Schalke 04)
Midfield	(France) Franck Ribéry (Bayern Munich)	(Bosnia and Herzegovina) Zvjezdan Misimović (Wolfsburg)	(Bosnia and Herzegovina) Sejad Salihović (Hoffenheim)	(Germany) Jermaine Jones (Schalke 04)
Attack	(Bosnia and Herzegovina) Edin Džeko (Wolfsburg)		(Brazil) Grafite (Wolfsburg)	(Germany) Mario Gómez (VfB Stuttgart)

== Attendances ==
No.	Team	Matches	Total	Average
1	Borussia Dortmund	17	1,272,460	74,851
2	Bayern München	17	1,173,000	69,000
3	Schalke 04	17	1,043,580	61,387
4	Hamburger SV	17	931,165	54,774
5	Hertha BSC	17	886,668	52,157
6	VfB Stuttgart	17	883,646	51,979
7	1. FC Köln	17	838,367	49,316
8	Borussia Mönchengladbach	17	805,397	47,376
9	Eintracht Frankfurt	17	800,100	47,065
10	Hannover 96	17	711,616	41,860
11	Werder Bremen	17	686,381	40,375
12	1899 Hoffenheim	17	477,300	28,076
13	Karlsruher SC	17	476,312	28,018
14	VfL Wolfsburg	17	465,929	27,408
15	Bayer Leverkusen	17	442,750	26,044
16	VfL Bochum	17	433,762	25,515
17	Arminia Bielefeld	17	398,900	23,465
18	Energie Cottbus	17	284,245	16,720
