= Stephan Straub =

German footballer

Personal information
- Full name: Stephan Straub
- Date of birth: 25 January 1971 (age 55)
- Place of birth: Saarbrücken, West Germany
- Height: 1.83 m (6 ft 0 in)
- Position: Goalkeeper

Youth career
- 1979–1984: DJK Folsterhöhe
- 1984–1987: ATSV Saarbrücken

Senior career*
Years	Team	Apps	(Gls)
1993–1996	1. FC Saarbrücken	52	(0)
1996–1997	Eintracht Trier	11	(0)
1997–2000	Waldhof Mannheim	48	(0)
2000–2001	1. FC Saarbrücken	0	(0)
2001–2009	Alemannia Aachen	149	(0)
Total		260	(0)
- * Club domestic league appearances and goals

Stephan Straub (born 25 January 1971 in Saarbrücken) is a German former professional footballer who played as a goalkeeper.

== Career statistics ==
Appearances and goals by club, season and competition
Club	Season	League			National cup		Europe		Total	
Club	Season	Division	Apps	Goals	Apps	Goals	Apps	Goals	Apps	Goals
1. FC Saarbrücken	1993–94	2. Bundesliga	1	0	0	0	0	0	1	0
1. FC Saarbrücken	1994–95	2. Bundesliga	22	0	0	0	—		22	0
1. FC Saarbrücken	1995–96	Regionalliga West/Südwest	29	0	1	0	—		30	0
1. FC Saarbrücken	Total		52	0	1	0	—		53	0
Eintracht Trier	1996–97	Regionalliga West/Südwest	11	0	—		—		11	0
Waldhof Mannheim	1997–98	Regionalliga Süd	30	0	4	0	—		34	0
Waldhof Mannheim	1998–99	Regionalliga Süd	14	0	1	0	—		15	0
Waldhof Mannheim	1999–2000	2. Bundesliga	4	0	0	0	—		4	0
Waldhof Mannheim	Total		48	0	5	0	—		53	0
1. FC Saarbrücken	2000–01	2. Bundesliga	0	0	0	0	—		0	0
Alemannia Aachen	2001–02	2. Bundesliga	19	0	0	0	—		19	0
Alemannia Aachen	2002–03	2. Bundesliga	34	0	1	0	—		35	0
Alemannia Aachen	2003–04	2. Bundesliga	34	0	6	0	—		40	0
Alemannia Aachen	2004–05	2. Bundesliga	28	0	2	0	8	0	38	0
Alemannia Aachen	2005–06	2. Bundesliga	3	0	0	0	—		3	0
Alemannia Aachen	2006–07	Bundesliga	16	0	2	0	—		18	0
Alemannia Aachen	2007–08	2. Bundesliga	14	0	2	0	—		16	0
Alemannia Aachen	2008–09	2. Bundesliga	1	0	0	0	—		1	0
Alemannia Aachen	Total		149	0	13	0	8	0	160	0
Career total			260	0	19	0	8	0	287	0
