= Cristian Fiél =

German footballer and coach

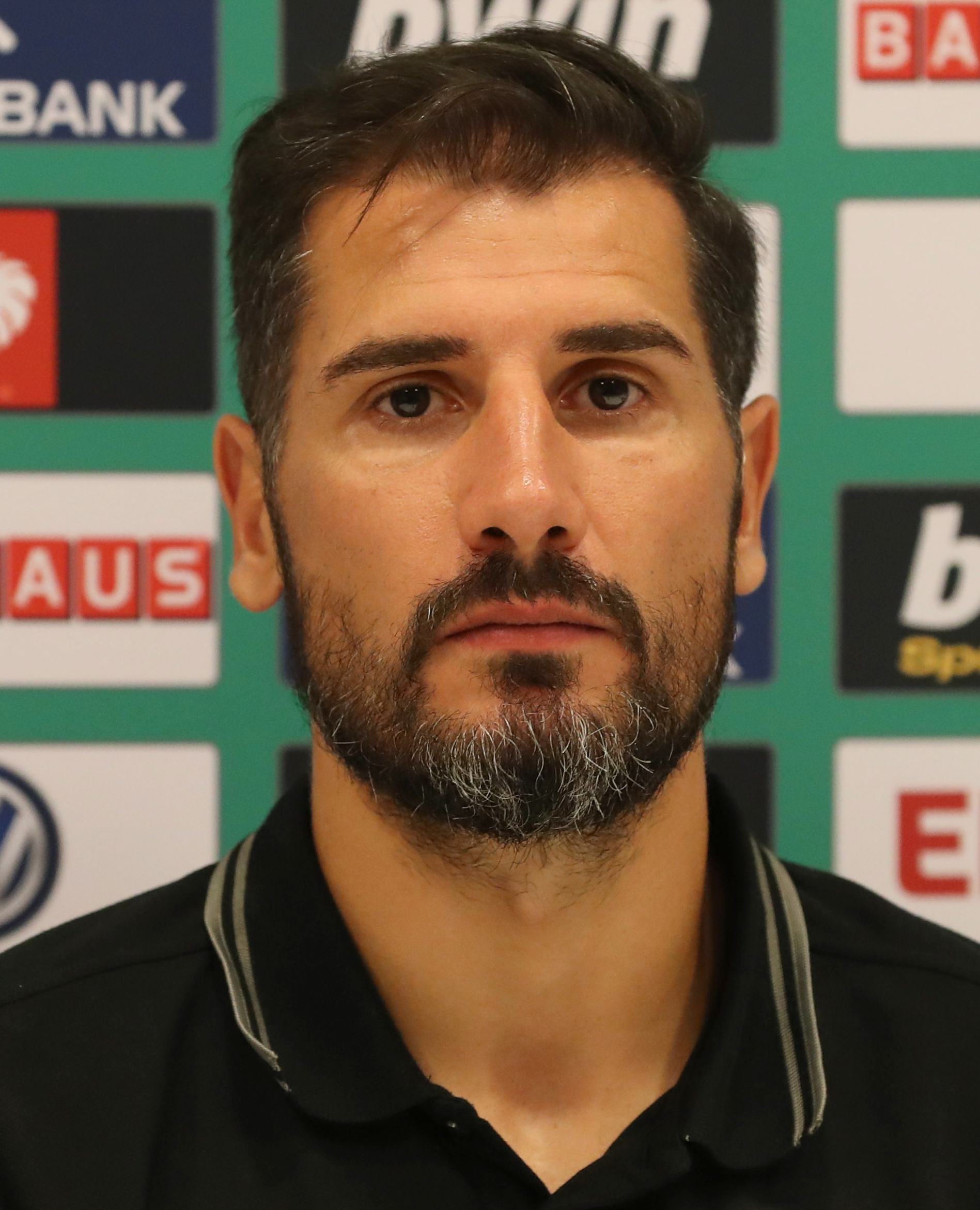
- Fiél with Dynamo Dresden in 2019

Personal information
- Date of birth: 12 March 1980 (age 46)
- Place of birth: Esslingen, West Germany
- Height: 1.82 m (6 ft 0 in)
- Position: Midfielder

Team information
- Current team: RB Leipzig (assistant)

Youth career
- 1986–1988: VfB Oberesslingen
- 1988–1994: VfB Stuttgart
- 1994–1997: VfL Kirchheim
- 1997–1999: Stuttgarter Kickers

Senior career*
Years	Team	Apps	(Gls)
1999–2001	Stuttgarter Kickers	27	(2)
2001–2003	Union Berlin	48	(8)
2003–2004	VfL Bochum	6	(0)
2003–2004	→ VfL Bochum II	5	(2)
2004–2010	Alemannia Aachen	179	(11)
2010–2015	Dynamo Dresden	108	(3)
Total		373	(26)

Managerial career
- 2018: Dynamo Dresden (interim)
- 2019: Dynamo Dresden
- 2021–2023: 1. FC Nürnberg II
- 2023–2024: 1. FC Nürnberg
- 2024–2025: Hertha BSC
- * Club domestic league appearances and goals

Cristian Fiél (born 12 March 1980) is a German-Spanish professional manager and former player who is currently the assistant coach of Bundesliga club RB Leipzig.

== Career ==
In his youth, Fiél played for various clubs in his native Baden-Württemberg, before joining Stuttgarter Kickers in 1997, and it was here that he made his professional debut, coming on as a substitute for Alexander Blessin in a 2. Bundesliga match against Waldhof Mannheim in April 2000. He made a further three appearances in the 1999–2000 season, and became a first-team regular the following season, where he scored two goals in 23 appearances, but was unable to prevent the club being relegated.

Fiél then signed for 1. FC Union Berlin, newly promoted to the second tier, and made 33 league appearances in his first season, scoring seven goals. He also got his first taste of European football, as Union had qualified for the UEFA Cup as the previous season's DFB-Pokal finalists, and Fiél played in four matches, assisting two goals in a first-round victory over Finnish side FC Haka, before Union were eliminated in the next round by Litex Lovech of Bulgaria. The following season, Union found themselves in financial trouble, and were forced to sell players, so Fiél was sold to VfL Bochum, getting his first chance to play in the Bundesliga. He finished the 2002–03 season by appearing in 16 appearances for Union Berlin and seven appearances for Bochum.

Fiél made his Bundesliga debut in January 2003, replacing Delron Buckley in a 2–1 victory over 1. FC Nürnberg. He made a further five appearances before the end of the season, but was not selected at all the following season, and in January 2004 he returned to the 2. Bundesliga, signing for Alemannia Aachen. Aachen were in the midst of a cup run, and Fiél helped the club to surprise victories over Bayern Munich and Borussia Mönchengladbach on the way 2004 DFB-Pokal final. Fiél was named as a substitute for the final, and came on for Willi Landgraf in the 73rd minute. He set up a last minute goal for Erik Meijer, but this proved to be only a consolation as Aachen lost 3–2 against Werder Bremen.

As Werder were double winners, Aachen entered the 2004–05 UEFA Cup, giving Fiél another opportunity to play in Europe, making four appearances as the club reached the group stage. The following season, Aachen finished in second place, and earned promotion to the Bundesliga. Fiél made 30 appearances at this level in the 2006–07 season, but the club were relegated, finishing 17th.

Fiél spent a further three seasons playing for Aachen in the second division, before leaving the club in 2010, after six and a half years, joining Dynamo Dresden of the 3. Liga. Despite injuries he was a key part of Dynamo's first-team, making 23 appearances in the 2010–11 season as the team won promotion to the 2. Bundesliga. The season almost ended in disaster, though, as Fiél scored an own goal in the last game of the season against Kickers Offenbach, which almost cost Dynamo their place in the promotion playoff. Dani Schahin saved the day, though, with a winner, and Dynamo secured third place. Fiél was able to make up for his earlier mistake in the playoff, scoring the equaliser in the second leg of the playoff against VfL Osnabrück, and setting up Schahin for the winning goal. Fiél was named as Dynamo's captain in summer 2011 after the departure of Thomas Hübener, but was replaced in this role by Robert Koch at the beginning of the 2012–13 season.

Fiél retired in the summer 2015.

== Managerial career ==
=== Dynamo Dresden ===
After retiring as a player in the summer 2015, Fiél was hired as a youth coach at Dynamo Dresden. He took over as the interim head coach on 23 August 2018 and was the interim head coach until Maik Walpurgis was hired on 11 September 2018. He lost his only match as interim head coach. On 24 February 2019 he was named head coach of Dresden again. On 2 December 2019 he left the club again after it dropped to last place in the 2019–20 2. Bundesliga.

=== 1. FC Nürnberg ===
Fiél was head coach of 1. FC Nürnberg II between 1 July 2021 and 20 February 2023. In Fiél first season as head coach, 1. FC Nürnberg II finished the in 11th place in the Regionalliga Bayern. He became assistant coach of the first team on 20 February 2023. The reserve team was in third place when he became assistant coach of the first team. Fiél took over the head coach position at 1. FC Nürnberg for the 2023–24 season, finishing 12th.

=== Hertha BSC ===
He moved to Hertha BSC in the summer of 2024 with a two-year contract. On 17 February 2025, he was sacked after a series of bad results, leaving the club in the 14th position.

== Personal life ==
Born in Germany, Fiél is of Spanish descent.

== Career statistics ==
=== Club ===
Appearances and goals by club, season and competition
Club	Season	League			DFB-Pokal		Continental		Other		Total		Ref.
Club	Season	Division	Apps	Goals	Apps	Goals	Apps	Goals	Apps	Goals	Apps	Goals	Ref.
Stuttgarter Kickers	1999–2000	2. Bundesliga	4	0	1	0	—		—		5	0	
Stuttgarter Kickers	2000–01	2. Bundesliga	23	2	0	0	—		—		23	2	
Stuttgarter Kickers	Total		27	2	1	0	—		—		28	2	—
Union Berlin	2001–02	2. Bundesliga	33	7	3	1	4 (Note: Appearances in UEFA Cup)	0	—		40	8	
Union Berlin	2002–03	2. Bundesliga	15	1	1	1	—		—		16	2	
Union Berlin	Total		48	8	4	2	4	0	—		56	10	—
VfL Bochum	2002–03	Bundesliga	6	0	1	0	—		—		7	0	
Alemannia Aachen	2003–04	2. Bundesliga	15	1	3	0	—		—		18	1	
Alemannia Aachen	2004–05	2. Bundesliga	24	2	2	0	6	0	—		32	2	
Alemannia Aachen	2005–06	2. Bundesliga	26	1	1	0	—		—		27	1	
Alemannia Aachen	2006–07	Bundesliga	30	2	3	0	—		—		33	2	
Alemannia Aachen	2007–08	2. Bundesliga	27	2	2	0	—		—		29	2	
Alemannia Aachen	2008–09	2. Bundesliga	28	2	1	0	—		—		29	2	
Alemannia Aachen	2009–10	2. Bundesliga	29	1	2	0	—		—		31	1	
Alemannia Aachen	Total		179	11	14	0	6	0	—		199	11	—
Dynamo Dresden	2010–11	3. Liga	23	0	0	0	—		2 (Note: Appearances in the promotion/relegation playoff.)	1	25	1	
Dynamo Dresden	2011–12	2. Bundesliga	24	1	2	0	—		—		26	1	
Dynamo Dresden	2012–13	2. Bundesliga	23	1	1	0	—		2	1	26	2	
Dynamo Dresden	2013–14	2. Bundesliga	17	1	0	0	—		—		17	1	
Dynamo Dresden	2014–15	3. Liga	21	0	2	0	—		—		23	0	
Dynamo Dresden	Total		108	3	5	0	—		4	2	117	5	—
Career total			368	24	25	2	10	0	4	2	407	28	—

=== Managerial record ===
As of match played 15 February 2025

Team	From	To	Record					
Team	From	To	G	W	D	L	Win %	Ref.
Dynamo Dresden	23 August 2018	11 September 2018	1	0	0	1	0.00	
Dynamo Dresden	24 February 2019	2 December 2019	28	8	7	13	28.57	
1. FC Nürnberg II	1 July 2021	20 February 2023	60	23	19	18	38.33	
1. FC Nürnberg	2 June 2023	7 June 2024	37	13	7	17	35.14	
Hertha BSC	7 June 2024	17 February 2025	25	9	4	12	36.00	
Total			151	53	37	61	35.10	—
