= Alexander Klitzpera =

German footballer

Personal information
- Date of birth: 19 October 1977 (age 49)
- Place of birth: Munich, West Germany
- Height: 1.84 m (6 ft 0 in)
- Position: Central defender

Team information
- Current team: Alemannia Aachen (Sporting director)

Youth career
- 1983–1988: TSV Waldtrudering
- 1988–1995: Bayern Munich

Senior career*
Years	Team	Apps	(Gls)
1995–1999	Bayern Munich (A)	85	(4)
1999–2002	Arminia Bielefeld	75	(5)
2002–2008	Alemannia Aachen	164	(15)
2008–2010	FSV Frankfurt	48	(2)
2010–2012	VfL Wolfsburg II	8	(0)
Total		370	(26)

International career
1997–1999	Germany U-21	19	(1)
1998	Germany Olympic	4	(1)
Medal record
Alemannia Aachen
Runner-up	DFB-Pokal	2004
- * Club domestic league appearances and goals

Alexander Klitzpera (born 19 October 1977) is a German former professional footballer who played as a central defender.

== Career ==
Born in Munich, Klitzpera played four years for FC Bayern Munich II, three years for Arminia Bielefeld and then six years successfully for Alemannia Aachen until 2008. With Aachen he was DFB-Pokal finalist in 2004 and playing in the 2004–05 UEFA Cup and the 2006–07 Bundesliga. In August 2008, he signed with FSV Frankfurt.

In February 2015 Klitzpera was hired by his former club Alemannia Aachen, in the position of sporting director.
