= Impuls =

German aircraft manufacturer

Impuls Flugdrachen GmbH
- Company type: Private company
- Industry: Aerospace
- Fate: No longer producing aircraft
- Headquarters: Munich, Germany
- Products: Hang gliders

Impuls Flugdrachen GmbH (English: Impulse Kites Limited), usually just called Impuls, was a German aircraft manufacturer that specialized in beginner and flight training hang gliders. The company was headquartered in Munich.

In February 2012 the company website carried an announcement that said: "Impuls Kites GmbH has stopped production of aircraft."

== Aircraft ==
Summary of aircraft built by Impuls
Model name	First flight	Number built	Type
Impuls 14			training hang glider
Impuls 17			training hang glider
Impuls IC			intermediate hang glider
