= Football Manager of the Year (Germany) =

Annual association football award

The title Football Manager of the Year (Trainer des Jahres) has been awarded in Germany since 2002. Eligible are German managers and non-German managers coaching in Germany. The award is determined by a poll of German football journalists from the Association of German Sports Journalists (Verband der Deutschen Sportjournalisten) and the publication kicker.

== Football Managers of the Year ==
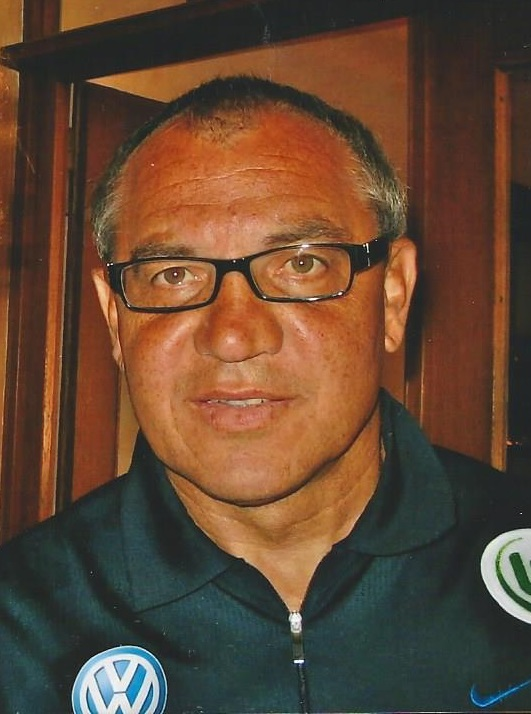
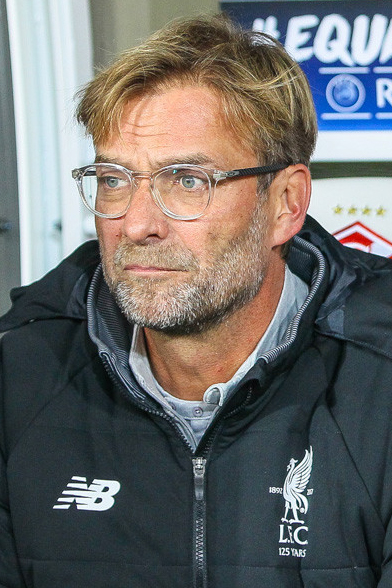
Felix Magath and Jürgen Klopp share the record for most award wins, with three each.

Year	Manager	Team
2002	Klaus Toppmöller	Bayer Leverkusen
2003	Felix Magath	VfB Stuttgart
2004	Thomas Schaaf	Werder Bremen
2005	Felix Magath	Bayern Munich
2006	Jürgen Klinsmann	Germany
2007	Armin Veh	VfB Stuttgart
2008	Ottmar Hitzfeld	Bayern Munich
2009	Felix Magath	VfL Wolfsburg
2010	(Netherlands) Louis van Gaal	Bayern Munich
2011	Jürgen Klopp	Borussia Dortmund
2012	Jürgen Klopp	Borussia Dortmund
2013	Jupp Heynckes	Bayern Munich
2014	Joachim Löw	Germany
2015	Dieter Hecking	VfL Wolfsburg
2016	Dirk Schuster	Darmstadt 98
2017	Julian Nagelsmann	TSG Hoffenheim
2018	Jupp Heynckes	Bayern Munich
2019	Jürgen Klopp	(England) Liverpool
2020	Hansi Flick	Bayern Munich
2021	Thomas Tuchel	(England) Chelsea
2022	Christian Streich	SC Freiburg
2023	(Switzerland) Urs Fischer	Union Berlin
2024	(Spain) Xabi Alonso	Bayer 04 Leverkusen
2025	Julian Schuster	SC Freiburg

== See also ==
- Footballer of the Year (Germany)
- German Sportspersonality of the Year
- VDV Awards
