= Faton Popova =

German footballer

Personal information
- Date of birth: 22 December 1984 (age 41)
- Place of birth: Stolberg, West Germany
- Height: 1.72 m (5 ft 8 in)
- Position: Midfielder

Youth career
- 1992–1994: TSV Donnerberg
- 1994–1996: Alemannia Aachen
- 1996–1999: Blau-Weiß Aachen
- 1999–2001: Alemannia Aachen
- 2001–2004: Roda JC

Senior career*
| Years | Team | Apps | (Gls) |
| 2005 | Borussia Freialdenhoven | 29 | (7) |
| 2005–2010 | Alemannia Aachen II | 110 | (31) |
| 2007–2010 | Alemannia Aachen | 1 | (0) |
| 2011 | Borussia Freialdenhoven | | |
| 2011–2012 | Hertha Walheim | 1 | (0) |
| 2012–2014 | SV Rott | 22 | (5) |
| 2014–2015 | Kohlscheider BC | 17 | (4) |
| 2017 | Sportfreunde Düren | 2 | (0) |
| Total | | 182 | (47) |

Managerial career
- 2011: Hertha Walheim U17
- 2013–2015: Alemannia Aachen U15
- 2015–2016: SV Rott
- 2016–2020: Sportfreunde Düren
- * Club domestic league appearances and goals

Faton Popova (born 22 December 1984 in Stolberg) is a German retired footballer. Popova also holds Albanian citizenship.
