= Mirko Casper =

German footballer

Personal information
- Date of birth: 1 March 1982 (age 44)
- Place of birth: Zell (Mosel), West Germany
- Height: 1.83 m (6 ft 0 in)
- Position: Defender

Youth career
- 1986–1997: SG Bremm
- 1997–2000: FSV Salmrohr
- 2001: Bayer Leverkusen

Senior career*
Years	Team	Apps	(Gls)
2001–2004	Fortuna Köln	56	(3)
2004	Yurdumspor Köln	17	(1)
2004–2012	Alemannia Aachen	105	(2)
2004–2012	Alemannia Aachen II	33	(2)
2012–2014	Bayer Leverkusen II	35	(1)
2014–2015	BV Burscheid	18	(25)
2018–2019	SV Wermelskirchen	10	(1)
Total		274	(35)

Managerial career
- 2017–2019: Bayer Leverkusen U15
- * Club domestic league appearances and goals

Mirko Casper (born 1 March 1982 in Zell (Mosel), Rhineland-Palatinate) is a German former professional footballer who played as a defender.
