= 2006–07 Bundesliga =

44th season of the Bundesliga

Bundesliga
- Season: 2006–07
- Dates: 11 August 2006 – 19 May 2007
- Champions: VfB Stuttgart; 3rd Bundesliga title 5th German title
- Runner up: Schalke 04
- Relegated: Mainz 05; Alemannia Aachen; Borussia M'gladbach
- Champions League: VfB Stuttgart; Schalke 04; Werder Bremen
- UEFA Cup: Bayern Munich; Bayer Leverkusen; 1. FC Nürnberg (via domestic cup)
- Intertoto Cup: Hamburger SV
- Matches: 306
- Goals: 837 (2.74 per match)
- Top goalscorer: Theofanis Gekas (20)
- Biggest home win: Hannover 5–0 Hertha
- Biggest away win: Bochum 0–6 Bremen
- Highest scoring: Frankfurt 2–6 Bremen

The 2006–07 Bundesliga was the 44th season of the Bundesliga, Germany's premier football league. It began on 11 August 2006 and ended on 19 May 2007. Bayern Munich were the defending champions.

== Team changes from 2005–06 ==
Three teams from the 2. Bundesliga were promoted at the end of previous season:

- VfL Bochum (champions)
- Alemannia Aachen (runners-up)
- Energie Cottbus

The three teams relegated were:

- 1. FC Kaiserslautern
- 1. FC Köln
- MSV Duisburg

== Season overview ==
VfB Stuttgart began the campaign with the youngest squad of the Bundesliga and were widely seen as a competitor for a UEFA Cup berth. They began their season with a 0–3 home defeat against 1. FC Nürnberg and even dropped in reach of the relegation zone after another home defeat against Borussia Dortmund during the third round.

During the rest of the season the team managed to stabilize in the upper third of the table, eventually winning the last eight games of the season while competitors Schalke 04, Werder Bremen and Bayern Munich struggled. Stuttgart went on to claim their third championship in the Bundesliga and fifth German championship overall with a 2–1 home victory against Energie Cottbus during the last round of the season.

One week after winning the league championship, Stuttgart failed to win the Double after losing the 2007 DFB-Pokal Final against Nürnberg with a score of 2–3.

Manager Armin Veh who claimed his first championship as a Bundesliga coach was elected German Football Manager of the Year, while striker Mario Gómez was named Footballer of the Year (Germany) in 2007.

== Team overview ==
Location of teams in the 2006–07 Fußball-Bundesliga

=== Stadia and locations ===
Team	Location	Venue	Capacity
Alemannia Aachen	Aachen	Tivoli	21,300
Arminia Bielefeld	Bielefeld	Schüco Arena	28,008
Bayer Leverkusen	Leverkusen	BayArena	22,500
Bayern Munich	Munich	Allianz Arena	69,901
VfL Bochum	Bochum	Ruhrstadion	31,328
Borussia Dortmund	Dortmund	Signal Iduna Park	80,708
Borussia Mönchengladbach	Mönchengladbach	Borussia-Park	54,067
Eintracht Frankfurt	Frankfurt	Commerzbank-Arena	52,300
Energie Cottbus	Cottbus	Stadion der Freundschaft	22,450
Hamburger SV	Hamburg	HSH Nordbank Arena	57,274
Hannover 96	Hanover	AWD-Arena	49,000
Hertha BSC	Berlin	Olympic Stadium	74,228
Mainz 05	Mainz	Stadion am Bruchweg	20,300
1. FC Nürnberg	Nuremberg	Easy Credit Stadion	47,559
Schalke 04	Gelsenkirchen	Veltins-Arena	61,673
VfB Stuttgart	Stuttgart	Gottlieb-Daimler-Stadion	58,000
Werder Bremen	Bremen	Weserstadion	42,358
VfL Wolfsburg	Wolfsburg	Volkswagen Arena	30,122

=== Personnel and kits ===
Team	Manager	Captain	Kit manufacturer	Shirt sponsor
Alemannia Aachen	(Germany) Michael Frontzeck	(Germany) Reiner Plaßhenrich	Jako	AachenMünchener
Arminia Bielefeld	(Germany) Ernst Middendorp	(Germany) Mathias Hain	Saller	Krombacher
Bayer Leverkusen	(Germany) Michael Skibbe	(Germany) Carsten Ramelow	Adidas	RWE
Bayern Munich	(Germany) Ottmar Hitzfeld	(Germany) Oliver Kahn	Adidas	Deutsche Telekom
VfL Bochum	(Switzerland) Marcel Koller	(Germany) Dariusz Wosz	Nike	DWS Group
Borussia Dortmund	(Germany) Thomas Doll	(Germany) Christian Wörns	Nike	! (Note: As a result of restructuring, the RAG business areas of chemicals, energy and real estate were transferred to a new business entity, but the company name was still unknown at that time. The placeholder during 2005–2006 was an artwork of an exclamation mark of the painter Otmar Alt.)
Borussia Mönchengladbach	(Netherlands) Jos Luhukay	(United States) Kasey Keller	Lotto	Kyocera
Eintracht Frankfurt	(Germany) Friedhelm Funkel	(Austria) Markus Weissenberger	Jako	Fraport
Energie Cottbus	(Germany) Petrik Sander	(Canada) Kevin McKenna	Saller	enviaM
Hamburger SV	(Netherlands) Huub Stevens	(Netherlands) Rafael van der Vaart	Puma	Fly Emirates
Hannover 96	(Germany) Dieter Hecking	(Albania) Altin Lala	Diadora	TUI Group
Hertha BSC	(Germany) Karsten Heine	(Germany) Arne Friedrich	Nike	Deutsche Bahn
Mainz 05	(Germany) Jürgen Klopp	(Germany) Dimo Wache	Lotto	DBV-Winterthur
1. FC Nürnberg	(Germany) Hans Meyer	(Germany) Raphael Schäfer	Adidas	mister*lady Jeans
Schalke 04	(Germany) Mirko Slomka	(Brazil) Marcelo Bordon	Adidas	Victoria Versicherung/Gazprom
VfB Stuttgart	(Germany) Armin Veh	(Portugal) Fernando Meira	Puma	EnBW
Werder Bremen	(Germany) Thomas Schaaf	(Germany) Torsten Frings	Kappa	Bwin (Note: The slogan "we win!" was featured on the shirt due to a ban on the promotion of commercial betting firms imposed by the City Municipality of Bremen.)
VfL Wolfsburg	(Germany) Klaus Augenthaler	(Netherlands) Kevin Hofland	Nike	Volkswagen/Tiguan

== Managerial changes ==
Team	Outgoing manager	Date of departure	Replaced by	Date of Appointment
Borussia Mönchengladbach	(Germany) Horst Köppel	30 June 2006	(Germany) Jupp Heynckes	1 July 2006
Hannover 96	(Germany) Peter Neururer	30 August 2006	(Germany) Dieter Hecking	10 September 2006
Alemannia Aachen	(Germany) Dieter Hecking	7 September 2006	(Germany) Michael Frontzeck	12 September 2006
Borussia Dortmund	(Netherlands) Bert van Marwijk	18 December 2006	(Germany) Jürgen Röber	19 December 2006
Borussia Mönchengladbach	(Germany) Jupp Heynckes	31 January 2007	(Netherlands) Jos Luhukay	1 February 2007
Bayern Munich	(Germany) Felix Magath	31 January 2007	(Germany) Ottmar Hitzfeld	1 February 2007
Hamburger SV	(Germany) Thomas Doll	1 February 2007	(Netherlands) Huub Stevens	3 February 2007
Arminia Bielefeld	(Germany) Thomas von Heesen	11 February 2007	(Germany) Frank Geideck	12 February 2007
Borussia Dortmund	(Germany) Jürgen Röber	12 March 2007	(Germany) Thomas Doll	13 March 2007
Arminia Bielefeld	(Germany) Frank Geideck	13 March 2007	(Germany) Ernst Middendorp	14 March 2007
Hertha BSC	(Germany) Falko Götz	10 April 2007	(Germany) Karsten Heine	11 April 2007

== League table ==
Pos	Team	Pld	W	D	L	GF	GA	GD	Pts	Qualification or relegation
1	VfB Stuttgart (C)	34	21	7	6	61	37	+24	70	Qualification to Champions League group stage
2	Schalke 04	34	21	5	8	53	32	+21	68	Qualification to Champions League group stage
3	Werder Bremen	34	20	6	8	76	40	+36	66	Qualification to Champions League third qualifying round
4	Bayern Munich	34	18	6	10	55	40	+15	60	Qualification to UEFA Cup first round (Note: Since 1. FC Nürnberg won the 2006–07 DFB-Pokal, thus qualifying for the UEFA Cup first round, Hamburger SV entered the Intertoto Cup third round.)
5	Bayer Leverkusen	34	15	6	13	54	49	+5	51	Qualification to UEFA Cup first round
6	1. FC Nürnberg	34	11	15	8	43	32	+11	48	Qualification to UEFA Cup first round
7	Hamburger SV	34	10	15	9	43	37	+6	45	Qualification to Intertoto Cup third round
8	VfL Bochum	34	13	6	15	49	50	−1	45	
9	Borussia Dortmund	34	12	8	14	41	43	−2	44	
10	Hertha BSC	34	12	8	14	50	55	−5	44	
11	Hannover 96	34	12	8	14	41	50	−9	44	
12	Arminia Bielefeld	34	11	9	14	47	49	−2	42	
13	Energie Cottbus	34	11	8	15	38	49	−11	41	
14	Eintracht Frankfurt	34	9	13	12	46	58	−12	40	
15	VfL Wolfsburg	34	8	13	13	37	45	−8	37	
16	Mainz 05 (R)	34	8	10	16	34	57	−23	34	Relegation to 2. Bundesliga
17	Alemannia Aachen (R)	34	9	7	18	46	70	−24	34	Relegation to 2. Bundesliga
18	Borussia Mönchengladbach (R)	34	6	8	20	23	44	−21	26	Relegation to 2. Bundesliga

Source: kicker.de
Rules for classification: 1) Points; 2) Goal difference; 3) Goals scored
(C) Champions; (R) Relegated

== Results ==
Home \ Away	AAC	BSC	DSC	BOC	SVW	FCE	BVB	SGE	HSV	H96	B04	M05	BMG	FCB	FCN	S04	VFB	WOB
Alemannia Aachen	—	0–4	2–0	2–1	2–2	1–2	1–4	2–3	3–3	1–4	2–3	2–1	4–2	1–0	1–1	0–1	2–4	2–2
Hertha BSC	2–1	—	1–1	3–3	1–4	0–1	0–1	1–0	2–1	4–0	2–3	1–2	2–1	2–3	2–1	2–0	2–2	2–1
Arminia Bielefeld	5–1	2–2	—	1–3	3–2	3–1	1–0	2–4	1–1	3–1	0–0	1–0	0–2	2–1	3–2	0–1	2–3	0–0
VfL Bochum	2–2	1–3	2–1	—	0–6	0–1	2–0	4–3	2–1	2–0	1–3	0–1	2–0	1–2	0–2	2–1	2–3	0–1
Werder Bremen	3–1	3–1	3–0	3–0	—	1–1	1–3	1–2	0–2	3–0	2–1	2–0	3–0	3–1	1–0	0–2	2–3	2–1
Energie Cottbus	0–2	2–0	2–1	0–0	0–0	—	2–3	0–1	2–2	0–1	2–1	2–0	3–1	0–3	1–1	2–4	0–0	3–2
Borussia Dortmund	0–0	1–2	1–1	1–1	0–2	2–3	—	2–0	1–0	2–2	1–2	1–1	1–0	3–2	0–0	2–0	0–1	1–0
Eintracht Frankfurt	4–0	1–2	0–3	0–3	2–6	1–3	1–1	—	2–2	2–0	3–1	0–0	1–0	1–0	2–2	1–3	0–4	0–0
Hamburger SV	4–0	1–1	1–1	0–3	1–1	1–1	3–0	3–1	—	0–0	0–0	2–2	1–1	1–2	0–0	1–2	2–4	1–0
Hannover 96	0–3	5–0	1–1	0–2	2–4	2–0	4–2	1–1	0–0	—	1–1	1–0	1–0	1–2	0–3	1–1	1–2	2–2
Bayer Leverkusen	3–0	2–1	1–2	1–4	0–2	3–1	2–1	2–2	1–2	0–1	—	1–1	1–0	2–3	2–0	3–1	3–1	1–1
Mainz 05	1–3	1–1	1–0	2–1	1–6	4–1	1–0	1–1	0–0	1–2	1–3	—	3–0	0–4	2–1	0–3	0–0	1–2
Borussia Mönchengladbach	0–0	3–1	1–0	0–2	2–2	2–0	1–0	1–1	0–1	0–1	0–2	1–1	—	1–1	0–0	0–2	0–1	3–1
Bayern Munich	2–1	4–2	1–0	0–0	1–1	2–1	2–0	2–0	1–2	0–1	2–1	5–2	1–1	—	0–0	2–0	2–1	2–1
1. FC Nürnberg	1–0	2–1	1–1	1–1	1–2	1–0	1–1	2–2	0–2	3–1	3–2	1–1	1–0	3–0	—	0–0	4–1	1–1
Schalke 04	2–1	2–0	2–1	2–1	2–0	2–0	3–1	1–1	0–2	2–1	0–1	4–0	2–0	2–2	1–0	—	1–0	2–0
VfB Stuttgart	3–1	0–0	3–2	1–0	4–1	2–1	1–3	1–1	2–0	2–1	3–0	2–0	1–0	2–0	0–3	3–0	—	0–0
VfL Wolfsburg	1–2	0–0	2–3	3–1	0–2	0–0	0–2	2–2	1–0	1–2	3–2	3–2	1–0	1–0	1–1	2–2	1–1	—

Source: DFB
Legend: Blue = home team win; Yellow = draw; Red = away team win.

== Statistics ==
=== Top goalscorers ===
Rank	Player	Club	Goals
1	(Greece) Theofanis Gekas	VfL Bochum	20
2	(Switzerland) Alexander Frei	Borussia Dortmund	16
2	(Netherlands) Roy Makaay	Bayern Munich	16
4	(Germany) Kevin Kurányi	Schalke 04	15
5	(Germany) Mario Gómez	VfB Stuttgart	14
5	(Serbia) Marko Pantelić	Hertha BSC	14
5	(Romania) Sergiu Radu	Energie Cottbus	14
5	(Egypt) Mohamed Zidan	Mainz 05	14
9	(Brazil) Cacau	VfB Stuttgart	13
9	(Brazil) Diego	Werder Bremen	13
9	(Germany) Miroslav Klose	Werder Bremen	13

== Awards ==
Annual awards
Footballer of the Year	(Germany) Mario Gómez (VfB Stuttgart)
VDV Player of the Season	(Brazil) Diego (Werder Bremen)
Coach of the Year	(Germany) Armin Veh (VfB Stuttgart)
Top scorer	(Greece) Theofanis Gekas (VfL Bochum)
Breakthrough Player of the Season	(Germany) Jan Schlaudraff (Alemannia Aachen)
Goal of the Year	(Brazil) Diego (Werder Bremen)

Team of the Season
Goalkeeper	(Germany) Timo Hildebrand (Stuttgart)			
Defenders	(France) Matthieu Delpierre (Stuttgart)	(Brazil) Naldo (Werder Bremen)	(Brazil) Marcelo Bordon (Schalke 04)	
Midfielders	(Germany) Thomas Hitzlsperger (Stuttgart)	(Germany) Bernd Schneider (Bayer Leverkusen)	(Germany) Torsten Frings (Werder Bremen)	(Brazil) Diego (Werder Bremen)
Forwards	(Germany) Jan Schlaudraff (Alemannia Aachen)	(Germany) Kevin Kurányi (Schalke 04)	(Greece) Theofanis Gekas (VfL Bochum)	

== Attendances ==
No.	Team	Average	Change	Highest
1	Borussia Dortmund	72,652	-0,2%	81,000
2	Bayern München	68,412	1,2%	69,000
3	Schalke 04	61,348	0,2%	61,482
4	Hamburger SV	56,024	6,4%	57,274
5	Hertha BSC	48,690	4,2%	74,220
6	Eintracht Frankfurt	47,625	13,8%	51,500
7	Borussia Mönchengladbach	47,485	-0,5%	54,067
8	VfB Stuttgart	45,888	17,3%	56,500
9	1. FC Nürnberg	41,555	27,4%	46,780
10	Werder Bremen	40,894	3,4%	42,500
11	Hannover 96	38,717	0,8%	49,000
12	VfL Bochum	24,969	37,1%	31,328
13	Arminia Bielefeld	23,127	5,4%	26,601
14	Bayer Leverkusen	22,412	0,3%	22,500
15	VfL Wolfsburg	22,327	1,1%	30,000
16	Alemannia Aachen	20,745	8,2%	21,300
17	Mainz 05	20,229	0,2%	20,300
18	Energie Cottbus	16,070	44,7%	22,450
