= Peter Neururer =

German football manager (born 1955)

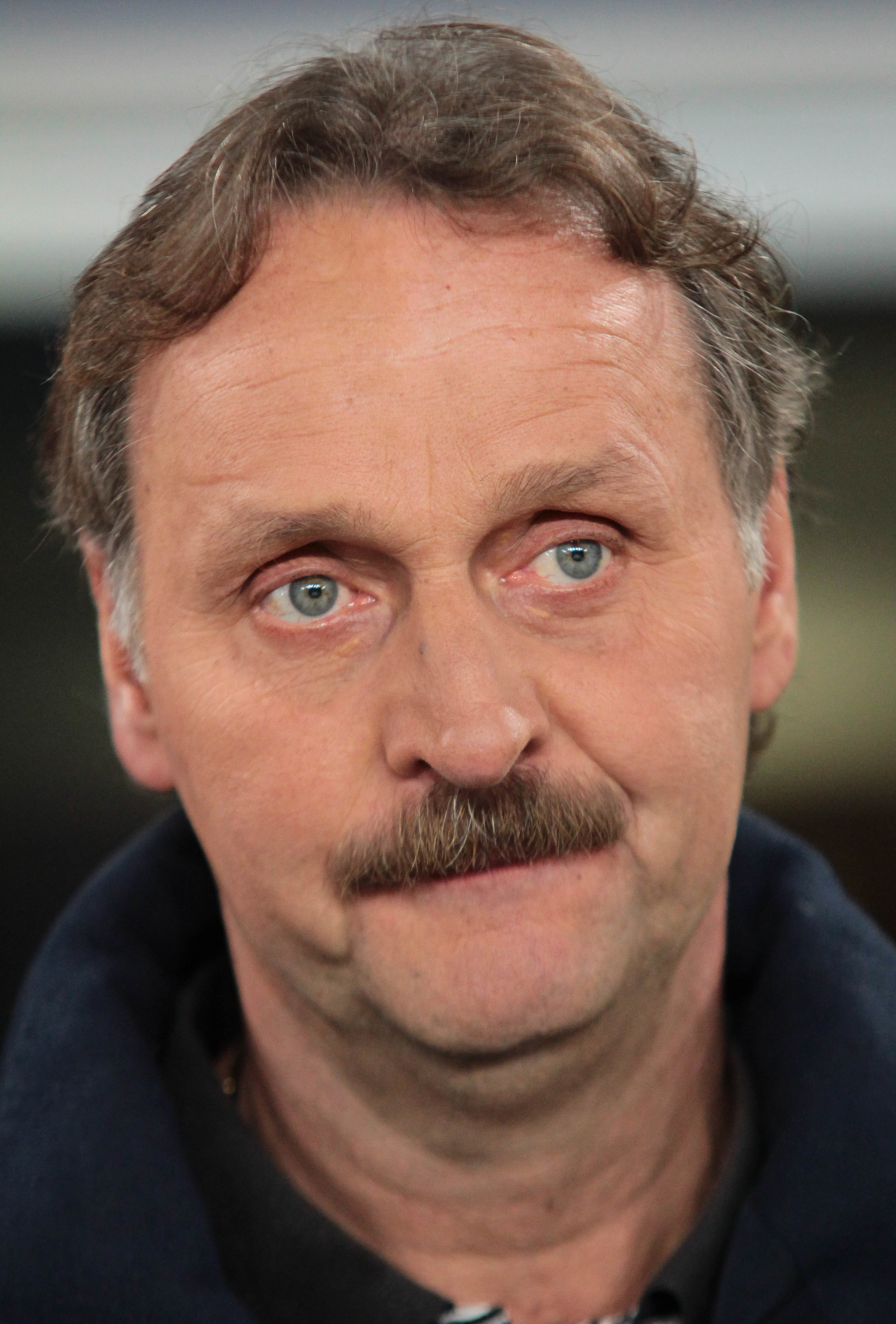
- Neururer in 2012

Personal information
- Date of birth: 26 April 1955 (age 71)
- Place of birth: Marl, North Rhine-Westphalia, West Germany
- Height: 1.88 m (6 ft 2 in)

Senior career*
Years	Team	Apps	(Gls)
- SpVgg Marl
- DJK Gütersloh
- VfB Remscheid
- STV Horst-Emscher
- ASC Schöppingen

Managerial career
- 1984–1985: TuS Haltern
- 1985–1986: SG Weitmar
- 1987: Rot-Weiss Essen
- 1988–1989: Alemannia Aachen
- 1989–1990: Schalke 04
- 1991: Hertha BSC
- 1991–1993: 1. FC Saarbrücken
- 1994–1995: Hannover 96
- 1996–1997: 1. FC Köln
- 1999–2000: Kickers Offenbach
- 2000–2001: LR Ahlen
- 2001–2005: VfL Bochum
- 2005–2006: Hannover 96
- 2008–2009: MSV Duisburg
- 2013–2014: VfL Bochum
- 2019: SG Wattenscheid 09 (sporting director)
- * Club domestic league appearances and goals

Peter Neururer (born 26 April 1955) is a German professional football manager, notable for coaching a number of Bundesliga clubs.

== Managerial career ==
Neururer had a minor playing career in the lower leagues before moving into coaching at TuS Haltern and SG Weitmar. He moved into the higher leagues as assistant manager of Horst Hrubesch at 2. Bundesliga club Rot-Weiss Essen in the 1986–87 season, and eventually had a two-month spell in sole command in late 1987. Neururer won two of his nine matches as manager.

Neururer then gained an outright managerial position at this level with Alemannia Aachen in January 1988. After landing the club a 6th-place finish where he won 10 out of 17 matches in the 1987–88 season and a strong following season, he was approached by Schalke 04, who were enduring a difficult season after relegation. Neururer left the club on 10 April 1989. His final match was a 1–0 loss against Darmstadt 98 on 7 April 1989. Alemannia Aachen were in seventh place when he left the club. He Finished with a record of 23 wins, nine draws, and 13 losses.

Neururer was chosen as manager of Schalke 04 on 11 April 1989. Neururer took the Ruhr club to 5th place in 1989–90 and started the following season brightly as well, with the club being second after the opening three months. However, this was not enough to satisfy the club president who fired him nonetheless in November 1990. He finished with a record of 33 wins, 16 draws, and 17 losses. In June 2007, Neururer created controversy when he claimed that doping had been rife in German football in the 1990s. He specifically referred to his time as manager of Schalke 04 in 1989–90 in this accusation, although this was refuted by the club itself.

Neururer did not have to wait too long for another opportunity as Bundesliga side Hertha BSC came calling after they had fired Pál Csernai. Neururer immediately took over in March 1991. The club were sat bottom the table at this point and Neururer was unable to stop the rot, as the team failed to win a single game in his 14 in charge and were duly relegated. Unsurprisingly, Neururer left Hertha BSC at this point in May 1991. He finished with a record of no wins, two draws, and 10 losses.

Neururer joined 1. FC Saarbrücken on 1 July 1991. At 1. FC Saarbrücken, Neururer enjoyed his greatest success yet as the team won the league and were promoted to the top flight. Their time in the Bundesliga was not to prove lengthy though, as they finished bottom in their first season back at this level, which also spelled the end for Neururer. Neururer left the club on 30 June 1993. He finished with a record of 21 wins, 25 draws, and 22 losses.

Neururer's next post was at second flight Hannover 96. Neururer took over on 7 November 1994. The club was at the bottom of the table. Neururer stabilised the team in his six months there and maintained their league status. Neururer left the club on 30 May 1995. He finished with a record of seven wins, seven draws, and six losses.

He had to wait until the following year for another management role, when Bundesliga side 1. FC Köln moved for him after firing Stephan Engels when they sunk into the relegation zone. Neururer again managed to retain a club's league status as they finished 12th. He managed a 10th-place finish the following season, but after a disappointing start to the 1997–98 season, he was fired in September 1997. He finished with a record of 25 wins, eight draws, and 27 losses.

Neururer was manager of Fortuna Düsseldorf from 22 April 1999 to the end of the season. He finished with a record of two wins, one draw, and five losses.

Neururer joined Kickers Offenbach in October 1999. The club were bottom of the 2. Bundesliga at the time, and Neururer was unable to reverse their fortunes and they slipped to the Regionalliga Süd. He began the following season still with the club but after failing to win either of their opening two games, the club acted swiftly and he was dismissed on 6 August 2000. He finished with a record of eight wins, nine draws, and 10 losses.

He returned to the second flight with LR Ahlen in October 2000. His first season brought a 7th-place finish, but an indifferent start to the 2001–02 season saw him leaving the club for fellow 2. Bundesliga outfit VfL Bochum.

VfL Bochum hired Neururer on 3 December 2001. VfL Bochum was another period of success for the coach as they were promoted in his first season and he retained their Bundesliga position for two seasons. Neururer left the club on 30 June 2005. He finished with a record of 53 wins, 33 draws, and 47 losses.

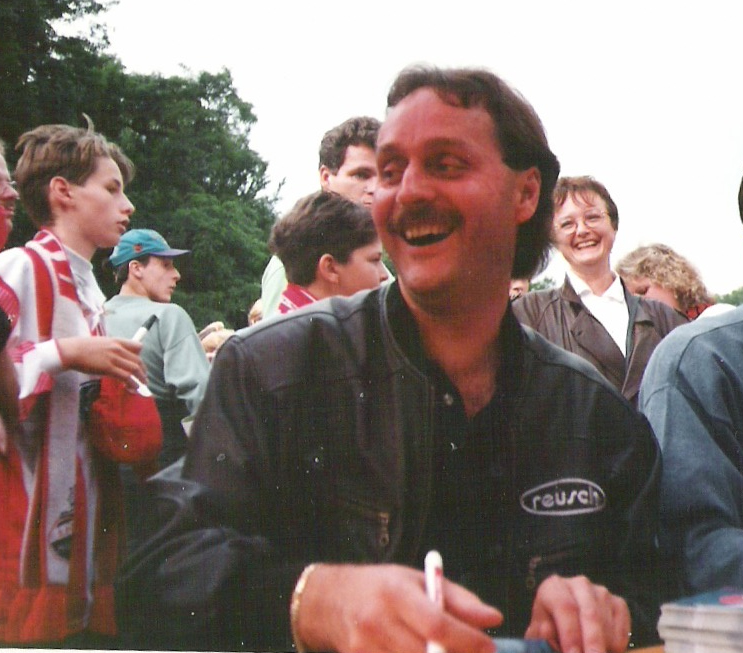
Neururer in 1996

In November 2005 he was given another shot at the top level, as Hannover took him on for a second spell after sacking Ewald Lienen. He guided the team to a comfortable 12th-place finish at the end of the 2005–06 season but a disastrous start to the 2006–07 season – conceding 11 goals in 3 defeats. Neururer resigned on 30 August 2006. He finished with a record of five wins, 11 draws, and 10 losses.

MSV Duisburg hired Neururer on 16 November 2008. He was fired by the club on 30 October 2009, finishing with a record of 16 wins, 11 draws, and seven losses.

On 8 April 2013, Neuruer returned as manager to Bochum. The club fired him on 9 December 2014. He finished with a record of 21 wins, 15 draws, and 24 losses.

In 2019, Neururer served as the sporting director for Regionalliga West club SG Wattenscheid 09.

== Managerial record ==
As of matches played on 16 January 2017.

Team	From	To	Record					
Team	From	To	M	W	D	L	Win %	Ref.
Rot-Weiss Essen	15 September 1987	16 November 1987	9	2	4	3	22.22	
Alemannia Aachen	11 January 1988	9 April 1989	45	23	9	13	51.11	
Schalke 04	11 April 1989	13 November 1990	69	35	16	18	50.72	
Hertha BSC	13 March 1991	28 May 1991	12	0	2	10	0.00	
1. FC Saarbrücken	1 July 1991	30 June 1993	68	21	25	22	30.88	
Hannover 96	7 November 1994	30 May 1995	20	7	7	6	35.00	
1. FC Köln	1 April 1996	30 September 1997	60	25	8	27	41.67	
Fortuna Düsseldorf	22 April 1999	30 June 1999	8	2	1	5	25.00	
Kickers Offenbach	25 October 1999	6 August 2000	27	8	9	10	29.63	
LR Ahlen	20 September 2000	27 November 2001	44	21	11	12	47.73	
VfL Bochum	3 December 2001	30 June 2005	133	53	33	47	39.85	
Hannover 96	9 November 2005	30 August 2006	26	5	11	10	19.23	
MSV Duisburg	16 November 2008	30 October 2009	34	16	11	7	47.06	
VfL Bochum	8 April 2013	9 December 2014	60	21	15	24	35.00	
Total			622	237	162	223	38.10	—
