= Benjamin Auer =

German footballer (born 1981)

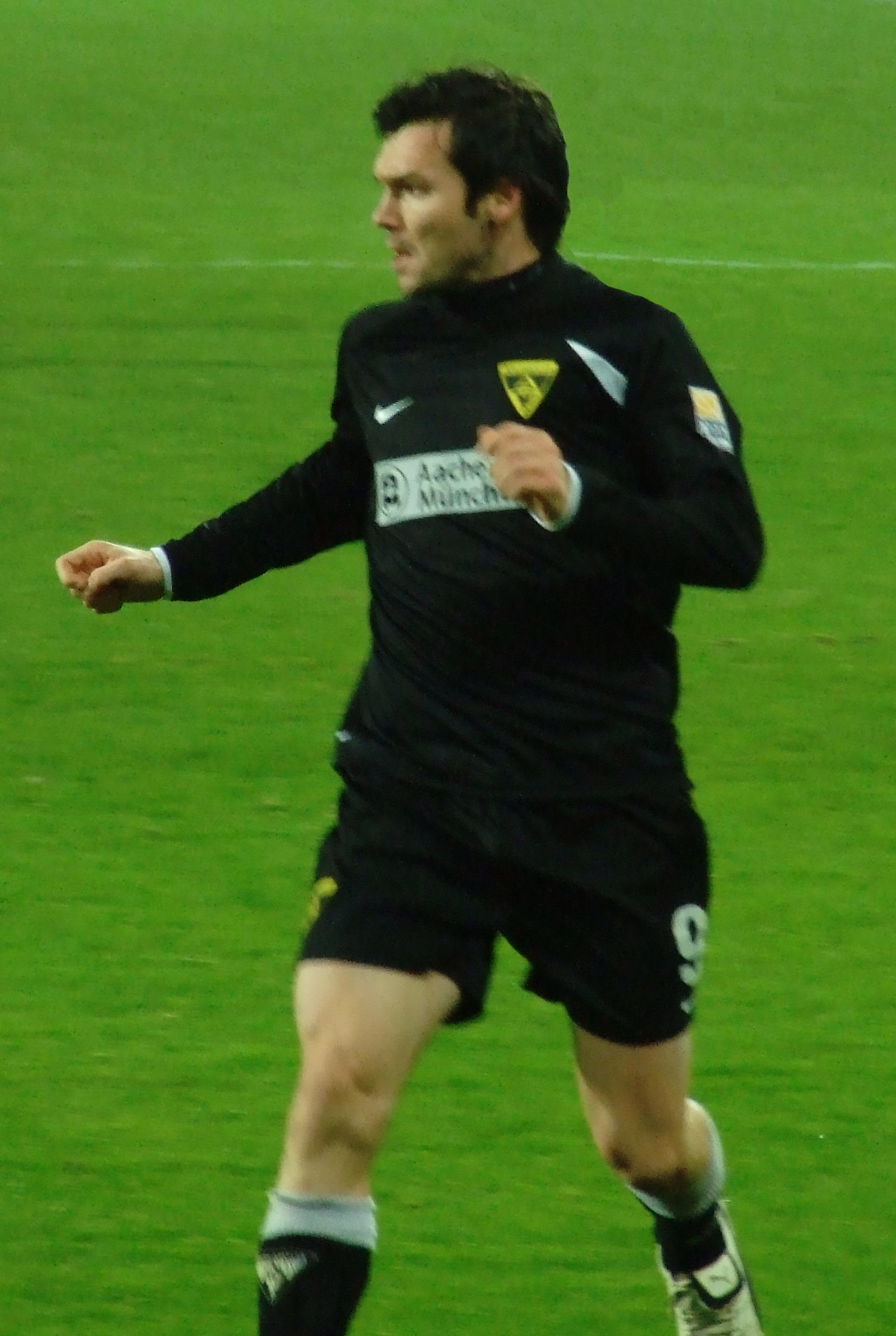
- Auer playing for Alemannia Aachen against Karlsruher SC in 2010

Personal information
- Full name: Benjamin Auer
- Date of birth: 11 January 1981 (age 45)
- Place of birth: Landau, West Germany
- Height: 1.86 m (6 ft 1 in)
- Position: Striker

Youth career
- –1988: ASV Landau
- 1988–1995: FSV Offenbach
- 1995–1999: 1. FC Kaiserslautern

Senior career*
| Years | Team | Apps | (Gls) |
| 1999–2000 | Karlsruher SC | 14 | (1) |
| 2000–2002 | Borussia Mönchengladbach | 25 | (3) |
| 2002–2006 | Mainz 05 | 116 | (30) |
| 2006–2008 | VfL Bochum | 19 | (5) |
| 2007 | → 1. FC Kaiserslautern (loan) | 7 | (0) |
| 2008–2012 | Alemannia Aachen | 125 | (56) |
| 2015-2017 | FK Pirmasens | 66 | (20) |
| Total | | 366 | (115) |

International career
| 2002–2004 | Germany U21 | 23 | (15) |
| 2004–2005 | Germany B | 3 | (4) |
- * Club domestic league appearances and goals

Benjamin Auer (born 11 January 1981) is a German former professional footballer who is a centre-forward.

Internationally, he represented Germany playing for the U21 and B teams.

== Career ==
Born in Landau, Auer played as a child for hometown club ASV Landau, before moving to his first bigger youth team, FSV Offenbach. At the age of 15 he moved to 1. FC Kaiserslautern, for whom he played until 1999. He moved to Karlsruher SC where he played for a year, before going to Borussia Mönchengladbach.

Auer played 23 times for the German under-21 team, scoring 15 goals, and played around 60 times in his youth between the ages of 16 and 20. He helped bring Mainz 05 up to the Bundesliga in 2004.

He joined 2. Bundesliga side Alemannia Aachen on 1 July 2008 and stayed there until Aachen's relegation to the 3. Liga in summer 2012.

After a career break from 2012 to January 2015, Auer signed for Regionalliga Südwest-side FK Pirmasens on 29 December 2014 before retiring in 2015.
