= Reiner Plaßhenrich =

German footballer

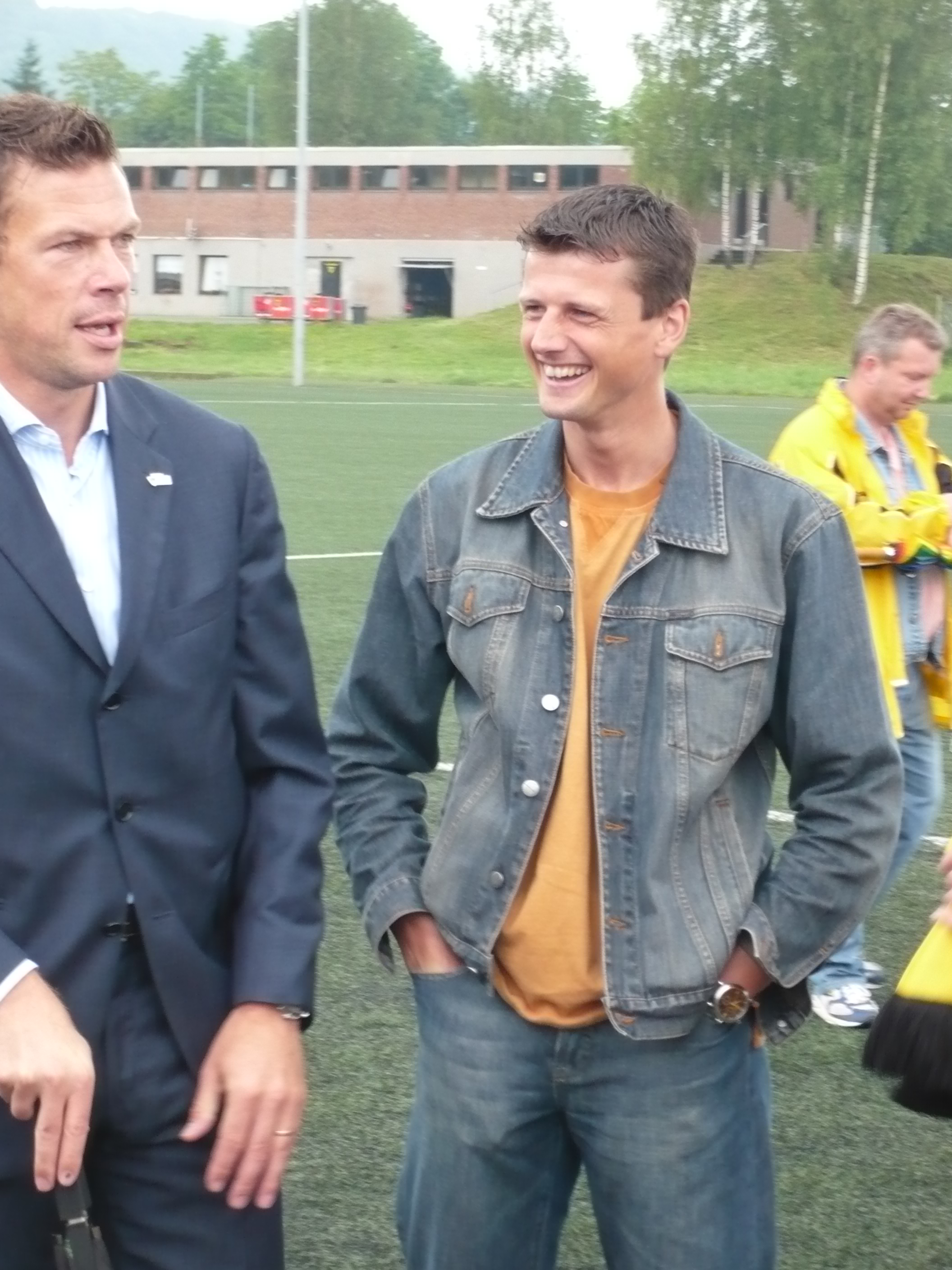
- Plaßhenrich (right) with Erik Meijer in 2008

Personal information
- Date of birth: 12 December 1976 (age 49)
- Place of birth: Paderborn, West Germany
- Height: 1.85 m (6 ft 1 in)
- Position: Midfielder

Youth career
- BSV Hövelriege-Liemke
- –1997: FC Stukenbrock

Senior career*
Years	Team	Apps	(Gls)
1997–2001	SC Verl	35	(5)
2001–2002	Greuther Fürth	5	(0)
2001–2002	SC Paderborn	0	(0)
2002–2004	VfB Lübeck	58	(3)
2004–2010	Alemannia Aachen	93	(8)
Total		191	(16)
- * Club domestic league appearances and goals

Reiner Plaßhenrich (born 12 December 1976) is a German former professional footballer who played as a midfielder. He spent his whole career in Germany, playing for SC Verl, SpVgg Greuther Fürth, SC Paderborn 07, VfB Lübeck and Alemannia Aachen.
