= 2009–10 Hannover 96 season =

Hannover 96
2009–10 season
- President: Martin Kind
- Manager: Dieter Hecking (until 19 August); Andreas Bergmann (20 August – 19 January); Mirko Slomka (from 20 January)
- Stadium: HDI-Arena
- Bundesliga: 15th
- DFB-Pokal: First round
- Top goalscorer: League: Didier Ya Konan (9); All: Didier Ya Konan (9)
- Highest home attendance: 49,000
- Lowest home attendance: 26,722
- Average home league attendance: 38,247
- Biggest win: Hannover 6–1 Gladbach
- Biggest defeat: Bayern 7–0 Hannover
| Home colours | Away colours |

The 2009–10 Hannover 96 season was the 114th season in the football club's history and 21st overall and eighth consecutive season in the top flight of German football, the Bundesliga, having been promoted from the 2. Bundesliga in 2002. Hannover 96 also participated in this season's edition of the domestic cup, the DFB-Pokal. This was the 51st season for Hannover in the HDI-Arena, located in Hanover, Lower Saxony, Germany. The season covered a period from 1 July 2009 to 30 June 2010.

The season was overshadowed by the suicide of the team's captain and goalkeeper Robert Enke on 10 November 2009.

== Players ==
=== Squad information ===
As of 8 May 2010

Note: Flags indicate national team as defined under FIFA eligibility rules; some limited exceptions apply. Players may hold more than one non-FIFA nationality.

| No. | Pos. | Nation | Player |
|---|---|---|---|
| 2 | DF | BRA | Vinícius |
| 3 | MF | DEN | Leon Andreasen |
| 4 | DF | SVK | Ján Ďurica (on loan from Lokomotiv Moscow) |
| 5 | DF | SUI | Mario Eggimann |
| 6 | DF | USA | Steve Cherundolo |
| 7 | MF | POR | Sérgio Pinto |
| 8 | MF | ALB | Altin Lala |
| 9 | FW | GER | Mike Hanke |
| 10 | MF | NED | Arnold Bruggink |
| 11 | FW | CIV | Didier Ya Konan |
| 13 | FW | GER | Jan Schlaudraff |
| 14 | MF | GER | Hanno Balitsch |
| 15 | DF | CIV | Constant Djakpa (on loan from Bayer Leverkusen) |
| 16 | GK | GER | Uwe Gospodarek |
| 17 | FW | GER | Rubic Ghasemi-Nobakht |
| 18 | FW | CIV | Arouna Koné (on loan from Sevilla) |
| 19 | DF | GER | Christian Schulz |
| 20 | MF | POL | Jacek Krzynówek |
| 21 | DF | TUN | Karim Haggui |

| No. | Pos. | Nation | Player |
|---|---|---|---|
| 22 | FW | ALB | Valdet Rama (Note: Rama was born in Mitrovica, Yugoslavia (now Kosovo), but also qualified to represent Albania internationally and made his international debut for Albania in March 2013 before changing his international allegiance to Kosovo in August 2016.) |
| 23 | DF | TUN | Sofian Chahed (Note: Chahed was born in West Berlin, West Germany (now Berlin, Germany), and represented Germany at U-19 and U-20 level, but also qualified to represent Tunisia internationally and made his debut for Tunisia in October 2009.) |
| 24 | FW | CZE | Jiří Štajner |
| 25 | MF | BRA | Élson (on loan from VfB Stuttgart) |
| 26 | MF | GER | Jan Rosenthal |
| 27 | GK | GER | Florian Fromlowitz |
| 28 | DF | GER | Leon Balogun (Note: Balogun was born in West Berlin, West Germany (now Berlin, Germany), but also qualified to represent Nigeria internationally through his father and made his international debut for Nigeria in March 2014.) |
| 30 | GK | GER | Morten Jensen |
| 31 | DF | GER | Tim Hofmann |
| 32 | FW | FIN | Mikael Forssell (Note: Forssell was born in Steinfurt, West Germany (now Germany), but also qualified to represent Finland internationally and made his international debut for Finland in June 1999.) |
| 33 | MF | GER | Manuel Schmiedebach |
| 34 | DF | GER | Konstantin Rausch (Note: Rausch was born in Kozhevnikovo, Soviet Union (now Russia), but was raised in Germany from the age of 6 and represented Germany at U-16, U-17, U-18, U-19 and U-21 level before making his international debut for Russia in October 2017.) |
| 35 | MF | TUN | Sofien Chahed |
| 36 | MF | GER | Hendrik Hahne |
| 37 | DF | USA | Sal Zizzo |
| 38 | FW | POL | Jarosław Lindner |
| 41 | MF | GER | Henrik Ernst |
| 42 | FW | GER | Florian Büchler |
| 44 | DF | GER | Christopher Avevor |

== Transfers ==
=== In ===
| No. | Pos | Player | From | Type | Window | Ends | Fee | Source |
|---|---|---|---|---|---|---|---|---|
| 11 | FW | (Ivory Coast) Didier Ya Konan | (Norway) Rosenborg | Transfer | Summer | 30 June 2012 | €550,000 | |
| 15 | DF | (Ivory Coast) Constant Djakpa | (Germany) Bayer Leverkusen | Loan | Summer | 30 June 2011 | €400,000 | |
| 21 | DF | (Tunisia) Karim Haggui | (Germany) Bayer Leverkusen | Transfer | Summer | 30 June 2011 | Free | |
| 22 | FW | (Albania) Valdet Rama | (Germany) FC Ingolstadt | Transfer | Summer | 30 June 2012 | Free | |
| 23 | DF | (Tunisia) Sofian Chahed | (Germany) Hertha BSC | Transfer | Summer | 30 June 2011 | Free | |
| 4 | DF | (Slovakia) Ján Ďurica | (Russia) Lokomotiv Moscow | Loan | Winter | 30 June 2010 | €300,000 | |
| 9 | GK | (Germany) Uwe Gospodarek | Free agent | Transfer | Winter | 30 June 2010 | – | |
| 18 | FW | (Ivory Coast) Arouna Koné | (Spain) Sevilla | Loan | Winter | 30 June 2010 | €500,000 | |
| 25 | MF | (Brazil) Élson | (Germany) VfB Stuttgart | Loan | Winter | 30 June 2010 | €300,000 | |
| – | MF | (Bulgaria) Chavdar Yankov | (Germany) MSV Duisburg | Return from loan | Winter | – | – | |

=== Out ===
| No. | Pos | Player | To | Type | Window | Fee | Source |
|---|---|---|---|---|---|---|---|
| 17 | MF | (France) Gaëtan Krebs | (Germany) Karlsruher SC | Transfer | Summer | Free | |
| 18 | DF | (Germany) Michael Tarnat | – | End of career | Summer | – | |
| 22 | DF | (Germany) Frank Fahrenhorst | (Germany) MSV Duisburg | Transfer | Summer | Free | |
| 23 | MF | (Bulgaria) Chavdar Yankov | (Germany) MSV Duisburg | Loan | Summer | €100,000 | |
| 25 | DF | (France) Valérien Ismaël | – | End of career | Summer | – | |
| 35 | MF | (Germany) Bastian Schulz | (Germany) 1. FC Kaiserslautern | Transfer | Summer | €100,000 | |
| – | MF | (Bulgaria) Chavdar Yankov | (Ukraine) Metalurh Donetsk | Transfer | Winter | €600,000 | |

== Competitions ==
Win Draw Loss

=== Overview ===
| Competition | First match | Last match | Starting round | Final position | Record | | | | | | | |
| Competition | First match | Last match | Starting round | Final position | Pld | W | D | L | GF | GA | GD | Win % |
|---|---|---|---|---|---|---|---|---|---|---|---|---|
| Bundesliga | 8 August 2009 | 8 May 2010 | Matchday 1 | 15th | 34 | 9 | 6 | 19 | 43 | 67 | −24 | 26.47 |
| DFB-Pokal | 2 August 2009 | | First round | First round | 1 | 0 | 0 | 1 | 1 | 3 | −2 | 0.00 |
| Total | | | | | 35 | 9 | 6 | 20 | 44 | 70 | −26 | 25.71 |

Last updated: 8 May 2010
Source: Competitions

=== Bundesliga ===
==== League table ====
| Pos | Team | Pld | W | D | L | GF | GA | GD | Pts | Qualification or relegation |
|---|---|---|---|---|---|---|---|---|---|---|
| 13 | 1. FC Köln | 34 | 9 | 11 | 14 | 33 | 42 | −9 | 38 | |
| 14 | SC Freiburg | 34 | 9 | 8 | 17 | 35 | 59 | −24 | 35 | |
| 15 | Hannover 96 | 34 | 9 | 6 | 19 | 43 | 67 | −24 | 33 | |
| 16 | 1. FC Nürnberg (O) | 34 | 8 | 7 | 19 | 32 | 58 | −26 | 31 | Qualification to relegation play-offs |
| 17 | VfL Bochum (R) | 34 | 6 | 10 | 18 | 33 | 64 | −31 | 28 | Relegation to 2. Bundesliga |

Source: kicker.de (in German)
Rules for classification: 1) points; 2) goal difference; 3) number of goals scored.
(O) Play-off winners; (R) Relegated

==== Results summary ====
| Overall | | | | | | | | Home | | | | | | Away | | | | | |
| Pld | W | D | L | GF | GA | GD | Pts | W | D | L | GF | GA | GD | W | D | L | GF | GA | GD |
|---|---|---|---|---|---|---|---|---|---|---|---|---|---|---|---|---|---|---|---|
| 34 | 9 | 6 | 19 | 43 | 67 | −24 | 33 | 5 | 4 | 8 | 27 | 33 | −6 | 4 | 2 | 11 | 16 | 34 | −18 |

Last updated: 8 May 2010.
Source: DFB

==== Results by round ====
| Round | 1 | 2 | 3 | 4 | 5 | 6 | 7 | 8 | 9 | 10 | 11 | 12 | 13 | 14 | 15 | 16 | 17 | 18 | 19 | 20 | 21 | 22 | 23 | 24 | 25 | 26 | 27 | 28 | 29 | 30 | 31 | 32 | 33 | 34 |
|---|---|---|---|---|---|---|---|---|---|---|---|---|---|---|---|---|---|---|---|---|---|---|---|---|---|---|---|---|---|---|---|---|---|---|
| Ground | A | H | A | H | A | H | A | H | A | H | A | H | A | H | H | A | H | H | A | H | A | H | A | H | A | H | A | H | A | H | A | A | H | A |
| Result | L | D | W | L | D | D | L | W | L | W | W | D | L | L | D | L | L | L | L | L | L | L | L | L | W | W | L | L | D | W | L | L | W | W |
| Position | 16 | 14 | 8 | 13 | 11 | 12 | 14 | 11 | 12 | 11 | 11 | 10 | 10 | 12 | 12 | 13 | 14 | 16 | 16 | 16 | 16 | 16 | 16 | 17 | 16 | 16 | 16 | 17 | 17 | 16 | 17 | 17 | 15 | 15 |

Updated to match(es) played on 8 May 2010. Source: DFB
A = Away; H = Home; W = Win; D = Draw; L = Loss

==== Matches ====
| 8 August 2009 1 | Hertha BSC | 1–0 | Hannover 96 | Berlin |
| 15:30 CEST (UTC+2) | Kačar 82' | Report | | Stadium: Olympiastadion; Attendance: 42,169; Referee: Guido Winkmann |

| 15 August 2009 2 | Hannover 96 | 1–1 | Mainz 05 | Hanover |
| 15:30 CEST (UTC+2) | Štajner 56' (pen.) | Report | Bancé 53' | Stadium: AWD-Arena; Attendance: 28,952; Referee: Felix Zwayer |

| 22 August 2009 3 | 1. FC Nürnberg | 0–2 | Hannover 96 | Nuremberg |
| 15:30 CEST (UTC+2) | | Report | Štajner 15', 86' | Stadium: easyCredit-Stadion; Attendance: 38,671; Referee: Jochen Drees |

| 29 August 2009 4 | Hannover 96 | 0–1 | 1899 Hoffenheim | Hanover |
| 15:30 CEST (UTC+2) | | Report | Carlos Eduardo 40' | Stadium: AWD-Arena; Attendance: 34,257; Referee: Lutz Wagner |

| 13 September 2009 5 | Werder Bremen | 0–0 | Hannover 96 | Bremen |
| 15:30 CEST (UTC+2) | | Report | | Stadium: Weser-Stadion; Attendance: 34,000; Referee: Markus Schmidt |

| 19 September 2009 6 | Hannover 96 | 1–1 | Borussia Dortmund | Hanover |
| 15:30 CEST (UTC+2) | Ya Konan 48' | Report | Şahin 45' | Stadium: AWD-Arena; Attendance: 43,754; Referee: Günter Perl |

| 26 September 2009 7 | VfL Wolfsburg | 4–2 | Hannover 96 | Wolfsburg |
| 15:30 CEST (UTC+2) | Misimović 8'; Gentner 45'; Hasebe 48'; Džeko 62' | Report | Balitsch 28'; Madlung 50' (o.g.) | Stadium: Volkswagen Arena; Attendance: 30,000; Referee: Peter Gagelmann |

| 3 October 2009 8 | Hannover 96 | 5–2 | SC Freiburg | Hanover |
| 15:30 CEST (UTC+2) | Chahed 7'; Bruggink 10'; Haggui 45+1'; Ya Konan 85'; Pinto 90+2' | Report | Banović 35'; Schuster 82' | Stadium: AWD-Arena; Attendance: 28,412; Referee: Wolfgang Stark |

| 17 October 2009 9 | Eintracht Frankfurt | 2–1 | Hannover 96 | Frankfurt |
| 15:30 CEST (UTC+2) | Liberopoulos 24'; Meier 74' | Report | Štajner 68' | Stadium: Commerzbank-Arena; Attendance: 40,700; Referee: Deniz Aytekin |

| 24 October 2009 10 | Hannover 96 | 1–0 | VfB Stuttgart | Hanover |
| 15:30 CEST (UTC+2) | Ya Konan 31' | Report | | Stadium: AWD-Arena; Attendance: 34,423; Referee: Guido Winkmann |

| 31 October 2009 11 | 1. FC Köln | 0–1 | Hannover 96 | Cologne |
| 15:30 CET (UTC+1) | | Report | Rosenthal 37' | Stadium: RheinEnergieStadion; Attendance: 45,000; Referee: Helmut Fleischer |

| 8 November 2009 12 | Hannover 96 | 2–2 | Hamburger SV | Hanover |
| 15:30 CET (UTC+1) | Jansen 15'; Elia 44' | Report | Ya Konan 28'; Štajner 88' (pen.) | Stadium: AWD-Arena; Attendance: 49,000; Referee: Jochen Drees |

| 21 November 2009 13 | Schalke 04 | 2–0 | Hannover 96 | Gelsenkirchen |
| 15:30 CET (UTC+1) | Farfán 69'; Morávek 90+1' | Report | | Stadium: Veltins-Arena; Attendance: 61,505; Referee: Lutz Wagner |

| 29 November 2009 14 | Hannover 96 | 0–3 | Bayern Munich | Hanover |
| 17:30 CET (UTC+1) | | Report | Müller 19'; Olić 47'; Gómez 90' | Stadium: AWD-Arena; Attendance: 49,000; Referee: Thorsten Kinhöfer |

| 5 December 2009 15 | Hannover 96 | 0–0 | Bayer Leverkusen | Hanover |
| 15:30 CET (UTC+1) | | Report | | Stadium: AWD-Arena; Attendance: 34,341; Referee: Peter Sippel |

| 12 December 2009 16 | Borussia Mönchengladbach | 5–3 | Hannover 96 | Mönchengladbach |
| 15:30 CET (UTC+1) | Haggui 14', 90+3' (o.g.); Friend 22'; Djakpa 58' (o.g.); Bradley 68' | Report | Ya Konan 36', 69'; Schulz 87' | Stadium: Borussia-Park; Attendance: 43,528; Referee: Michael Kempter |
Note: The three own-goals scored by Hannover 96 are considered an all-time record by the Bundesliga.

| 19 December 2009 17 | Hannover 96 | 2–3 | VfL Bochum | Hanover |
| 15:30 CET (UTC+1) | Schlaudraff 6', 33' | Report | Freier 51'; Epalle 54'; Fuchs 86' | Stadium: AWD-Arena; Attendance: 33,875; Referee: Knut Kircher |

| 16 January 2010 18 | Hannover 96 | 0–3 | Hertha BSC | Hanover |
| 15:30 CET (UTC+1) | | Report | Piszczek 30'; Raffael 33'; Gekas 80' | Stadium: AWD-Arena; Attendance: 28,712; Referee: Peter Gagelmann |

| 23 January 2010 19 | Mainz 05 | 1–0 | Hannover 96 | Mainz |
| 15:30 CET (UTC+1) | Schürrle 4' | Report | | Stadium: Bruchwegstadion; Attendance: 19,300; Referee: Guido Winkmann |

| 30 January 2010 20 | Hannover 96 | 1–3 | 1. FC Nürnberg | Hanover |
| 15:30 CET (UTC+1) | Štajner 65' | Report | Bunjaku 30', 64', 69' | Stadium: AWD-Arena; Attendance: 26,722; Referee: Knut Kircher |

| 6 February 2010 21 | 1899 Hoffenheim | 2–1 | Hannover 96 | Sinsheim |
| 15:30 CET (UTC+1) | Carlos Eduardo 35'; Salihović 40' (pen.) | Report | Koné 57' | Stadium: Rhein-Neckar-Arena; Attendance: 28,100; Referee: Helmut Fleischer |

| 13 February 2010 22 | Hannover 96 | 1–5 | Werder Bremen | Hanover |
| 15:30 CET (UTC+1) | Schulz 59' | Report | Niemeyer 11'; Naldo 18'; Andreasen 27' (o.g.); Hunt 44'; Pizarro 68' | Stadium: AWD-Arena; Attendance: 44,379; Referee: Markus Schmidt |

| 20 February 2010 23 | Borussia Dortmund | 4–1 | Hannover 96 | Dortmund |
| 15:30 CET (UTC+1) | Subotić 43'; Eggimann 60' (o.g.); Valdez 77'; Großkreutz 88' | Report | Koné 81' | Stadium: Signal Iduna Park; Attendance: 73,700; Referee: Lutz Wagner |

| 28 February 2010 24 | Hannover 96 | 0–1 | VfL Wolfsburg | Hanover |
| 15:30 CEST (UTC+2) | | Report | Misimović 78' | Stadium: AWD-Arena; Attendance: 34,312; Referee: Felix Brych |

| 6 March 2010 25 | SC Freiburg | 1–2 | Hannover 96 | Freiburg |
| 15:30 CET (UTC+1) | Abdessadki 70' | Report | Élson 63'; Cissé 73' (o.g.) | Stadium: Badenova-Stadion; Attendance: 19,100; Referee: Thorsten Kinhöfer |

| 13 March 2010 26 | Hannover 96 | 2–1 | Eintracht Frankfurt | Hanover |
| 15:30 CET (UTC+1) | Andreasen 14'; Pinto 57' | Report | Altıntop 45+2' | Stadium: AWD-Arena; Attendance: 38,847; Referee: Peter Gagelmann |

| 20 March 2010 27 | VfB Stuttgart | 2–0 | Hannover 96 | Stuttgart |
| 15:30 CET (UTC+1) | Marica 36', 54' | Report | | Stadium: Mercedes-Benz Arena; Attendance: 41,000; Referee: Guido Winkmann |

| 27 March 2010 28 | Hannover 96 | 1–4 | 1. FC Köln | Hanover |
| 15:30 CET (UTC+1) | Cherundolo 81' | Report | Tošić 12', 71'; Petit 20'; Novaković 28' (pen.) | Stadium: AWD-Arena; Attendance: 43,218; Referee: Jochen Drees |

| 4 April 2010 29 | Hamburger SV | 0–0 | Hannover 96 | Hamburg |
| 17:30 CEST (UTC+2) | | Report | | Stadium: HSH Nordbank Arena; Attendance: 57,000; Referee: Peter Sippel |

| 10 April 2010 30 | Hannover 96 | 4–2 | Schalke 04 | Hanover |
| 15:30 CEST (UTC+2) | Westermann 17' (o.g.); Ya Konan 29', 90+2'; Balitsch 80' | Report | Edu 46'; Rakitić 52' (pen.) | Stadium: AWD-Arena; Attendance: 49,000; Referee: Peter Gagelmann |

| 17 April 2010 31 | Bayern Munich | 7–0 | Hannover 96 | Munich |
| 18:30 CEST (UTC+2) | Olić 22', 49'; Robben 30', 50', 90+1'; Müller 44', 62' | Report | | Stadium: Allianz Arena; Attendance: 69,000; Referee: Markus Wingenbach |

| 24 April 2010 32 | Bayer Leverkusen | 3–0 | Hannover 96 | Leverkusen |
| 15:30 CEST (UTC+2) | Kießling 26', 88' (pen.); Kaplan 64' | Report | | Stadium: BayArena; Attendance: 30,210; Referee: Thorsten Kinhöfer |

| 1 May 2010 33 | Hannover 96 | 6–1 | Borussia Mönchengladbach | Hanover |
| 15:30 CEST (UTC+2) | Haggui 16'; Pinto 23'; Ya Konan 27'; Hanke 39'; Chahed 53'; Bruggink 74' | Report | Herrmann 69' | Stadium: AWD-Arena; Attendance: 49,000; Referee: Wolfgang Stark |

| 8 May 2010 34 | VfL Bochum | 0–3 | Hannover 96 | Bochum |
| 15:30 CEST (UTC+2) | | Report | Bruggink 9'; Hanke 23'; Pinto 45' | Stadium: rewirpowerSTADION; Attendance: 30,748; Referee: Manuel Gräfe |

=== DFB-Pokal ===
| 2 August 2009 First round | Eintracht Trier | 3–1 | Hannover 96 | Trier |
| 17:30 CEST (UTC+2) | Wagner 61'; Çınar 65'; Senesie 90+1' | Report | Rosenthal 40' | Stadium: Moselstadion; Attendance: 6,000; Referee: Markus Schmidt |

== Statistics ==
=== Appearances and goals ===
As of 8 May 2010

| No. | Pos | Player | Bundesliga | | DFB-Pokal | | Total | |
| No. | Pos | Player | Apps | Goals | Apps | Goals | Apps | Goals |
|---|---|---|---|---|---|---|---|---|
| 1 | GK | (Germany) Robert Enke | 6 | 0 | 1 | 0 | 7 | 0 |
| 2 | DF | (Brazil) Vinícius | 0 | 0 | 0 | 0 | 0 | 0 |
| 3 | MF | (Denmark) Leon Andreasen | 7 | 1 | 0 | 0 | 7 | 1 |
| 4 | DF | (Czech Republic) Ján Ďurica | 8+1 | 0 | 0 | 0 | 9 | 0 |
| 5 | DF | (Switzerland) Mario Eggimann | 12+7 | 0 | 0 | 0 | 19 | 0 |
| 6 | DF | (United States) Steve Cherundolo | 23+3 | 1 | 1 | 0 | 27 | 1 |
| 7 | MF | (Portugal) Sérgio Pinto | 20+6 | 4 | 0 | 0 | 26 | 4 |
| 8 | MF | (Albania) Altin Lala | 3+1 | 0 | 0 | 0 | 4 | 0 |
| 9 | FW | (Germany) Mike Hanke | 5+13 | 2 | 1 | 0 | 19 | 2 |
| 10 | MF | (Netherlands) Arnold Bruggink | 21+5 | 3 | 1 | 0 | 27 | 3 |
| 11 | FW | (Ivory Coast) Didier Ya Konan | 24+1 | 9 | 0 | 0 | 25 | 9 |
| 13 | FW | (Germany) Jan Schlaudraff | 5+5 | 2 | 0 | 0 | 10 | 2 |
| 14 | MF | (Germany) Hanno Balitsch | 25+2 | 2 | 1 | 0 | 28 | 2 |
| 15 | DF | (Ivory Coast) Constant Djakpa | 20+4 | 0 | 0 | 0 | 24 | 0 |
| 16 | GK | (Germany) Uwe Gospodarek | 0 | 0 | 0 | 0 | 0 | 0 |
| 17 | FW | (Germany) Rubic Ghasemi-Nobakht | 0+1 | 0 | 0 | 0 | 1 | 0 |
| 18 | FW | (Ivory Coast) Arouna Koné | 8 | 2 | 0 | 0 | 8 | 2 |
| 19 | DF | (Germany) Christian Schulz | 33 | 2 | 1 | 0 | 34 | 2 |
| 20 | MF | (Poland) Jacek Krzynówek | 3+8 | 0 | 0+1 | 0 | 12 | 0 |
| 21 | DF | (Tunisia) Karim Haggui | 30 | 2 | 1 | 0 | 31 | 2 |
| 22 | FW | (Albania) Valdet Rama | 4+11 | 0 | 1 | 0 | 16 | 0 |
| 23 | DF | (Tunisia) Sofian Chahed | 9+7 | 2 | 0 | 0 | 16 | 2 |
| 24 | FW | (Czech Republic) Jiří Štajner | 26+4 | 6 | 1 | 0 | 31 | 6 |
| 25 | MF | (Brazil) Élson | 9+9 | 1 | 0 | 0 | 18 | 1 |
| 26 | MF | (Germany) Jan Rosenthal | 13+3 | 1 | 1 | 1 | 17 | 2 |
| 27 | GK | (Germany) Florian Fromlowitz | 28 | 0 | 0 | 0 | 28 | 0 |
| 28 | DF | (Germany) Leon Balogun | 1+1 | 0 | 0 | 0 | 2 | 0 |
| 30 | GK | (Germany) Morten Jensen | 0 | 0 | 0 | 0 | 0 | 0 |
| 31 | DF | (Germany) Tim Hofmann | 0 | 0 | 0 | 0 | 0 | 0 |
| 32 | FW | (Finland) Mikael Forssell | 2 | 0 | 0+1 | 0 | 3 | 0 |
| 33 | MF | (Germany) Manuel Schmiedebach | 11+3 | 0 | 0+1 | 0 | 15 | 0 |
| 34 | DF | (Germany) Konstantin Rausch | 20+6 | 0 | 1 | 0 | 27 | 0 |
| 35 | MF | (Germany) Sofien Chahed | 0 | 0 | 0 | 0 | 0 | 0 |
| 36 | MF | (Germany) Hendrik Hahne | 0 | 0 | 0 | 0 | 0 | 0 |
| 37 | DF | (United States) Sal Zizzo | 0+1 | 0 | 0 | 0 | 1 | 0 |
| 38 | FW | (Poland) Jarosław Lindner | 0+1 | 0 | 0 | 0 | 1 | 0 |
| 41 | MF | (Germany) Henrik Ernst | 0+2 | 0 | 0 | 0 | 2 | 0 |
| 42 | FW | (Germany) Florian Büchler | 0+1 | 0 | 0 | 0 | 1 | 0 |
| 44 | DF | (Germany) Christopher Avevor | 0 | 0 | 0 | 0 | 0 | 0 |

=== Goalscorers ===
| Rank | No. | Pos | Name | Bundesliga | DFB-Pokal | Total |
|---|---|---|---|---|---|---|
| 1 | 11 | FW | (Ivory Coast) Didier Ya Konan | 9 | 0 | 9 |
| 2 | 24 | FW | (Czech Republic) Jiří Štajner | 6 | 0 | 6 |
| 3 | 7 | MF | (Portugal) Sérgio Pinto | 4 | 0 | 4 |
| 4 | 10 | MF | (Netherlands) Arnold Bruggink | 3 | 0 | 3 |
| 5 | 9 | FW | (Germany) Mike Hanke | 2 | 0 | 2 |
| 5 | 13 | FW | (Germany) Jan Schlaudraff | 2 | 0 | 2 |
| 5 | 14 | MF | (Germany) Hanno Balitsch | 2 | 0 | 2 |
| 5 | 18 | FW | (Ivory Coast) Arouna Koné | 2 | 0 | 2 |
| 5 | 19 | DF | (Germany) Christian Schulz | 2 | 0 | 2 |
| 5 | 21 | DF | (Tunisia) Karim Haggui | 2 | 0 | 2 |
| 5 | 23 | DF | (Tunisia) Sofian Chahed | 2 | 0 | 2 |
| 5 | 26 | MF | (Germany) Jan Rosenthal | 1 | 1 | 2 |
| 13 | 3 | MF | (Denmark) Leon Andreasen | 1 | 0 | 1 |
| 13 | 6 | DF | (United States) Steve Cherundolo | 1 | 0 | 1 |
| 13 | 25 | MF | (Brazil) Élson | 1 | 0 | 1 |
| Own goal | | | | 3 | 0 | 3 |
| Total | | | | 43 | 1 | 44 |

=== Clean sheets ===
| Rank | No. | Pos | Name | Bundesliga | DFB-Pokal | Total |
|---|---|---|---|---|---|---|
| 1 | 27 | GK | (Germany) Florian Fromlowitz | 5 | 0 | 5 |
| 2 | 1 | GK | (Germany) Robert Enke | 2 | 0 | 2 |
| Total | | | | 7 | 0 | 7 |

=== Disciplinary record ===
| Rank | No. | Pos | Name | Bundesliga | | | DFB-Pokal | | | Total | | |
| Rank | No. | Pos | Name | Yellow card | (yellow card) (yellow-red card) | Red card | Yellow card | (yellow card) (yellow-red card) | Red card | Yellow card | (yellow card) (yellow-red card) | Red card |
|---|---|---|---|---|---|---|---|---|---|---|---|---|
| 1 | 14 | MF | (Germany) Hanno Balitsch | 7 | 1 | 0 | 0 | 0 | 0 | 7 | 1 | 0 |
| 2 | 19 | DF | (Germany) Christian Schulz | 8 | 0 | 0 | 1 | 0 | 0 | 9 | 0 | 0 |
| 3 | 6 | DF | (United States) Steve Cherundolo | 8 | 0 | 0 | 0 | 0 | 0 | 8 | 0 | 0 |
| 4 | 7 | MF | (Portugal) Sérgio Pinto | 7 | 0 | 0 | 0 | 0 | 0 | 7 | 0 | 0 |
| 4 | 11 | FW | (Ivory Coast) Didier Ya Konan | 4 | 1 | 0 | 0 | 0 | 0 | 4 | 1 | 0 |
| 6 | 24 | FW | (Czech Republic) Jiří Štajner | 3 | 1 | 0 | 0 | 0 | 0 | 3 | 1 | 0 |
| 7 | 10 | MF | (Netherlands) Arnold Bruggink | 5 | 0 | 0 | 0 | 0 | 0 | 5 | 0 | 0 |
| 7 | 15 | DF | (Ivory Coast) Constant Djakpa | 5 | 0 | 0 | 0 | 0 | 0 | 5 | 0 | 0 |
| 9 | 25 | MF | (Brazil) Élson | 4 | 0 | 0 | 0 | 0 | 0 | 4 | 0 | 0 |
| 10 | 21 | DF | (Tunisia) Karim Haggui | 3 | 0 | 0 | 0 | 0 | 0 | 3 | 0 | 0 |
| 11 | 5 | DF | (Switzerland) Mario Eggimann | 2 | 0 | 0 | 0 | 0 | 0 | 2 | 0 | 0 |
| 11 | 13 | FW | (Germany) Jan Schlaudraff | 2 | 0 | 0 | 0 | 0 | 0 | 2 | 0 | 0 |
| 11 | 23 | DF | (Tunisia) Sofian Chahed | 2 | 0 | 0 | 0 | 0 | 0 | 2 | 0 | 0 |
| 11 | 26 | MF | (Germany) Jan Rosenthal | 1 | 0 | 0 | 1 | 0 | 0 | 2 | 0 | 0 |
| 15 | 3 | FW | (Denmark) Leon Andreasen | 1 | 0 | 0 | 0 | 0 | 0 | 1 | 0 | 0 |
| 15 | 4 | DF | (Czech Republic) Ján Ďurica | 1 | 0 | 0 | 0 | 0 | 0 | 1 | 0 | 0 |
| 15 | 8 | MF | (Albania) Altin Lala | 1 | 0 | 0 | 0 | 0 | 0 | 1 | 0 | 0 |
| 15 | 9 | FW | (Germany) Mike Hanke | 1 | 0 | 0 | 0 | 0 | 0 | 1 | 0 | 0 |
| 15 | 22 | FW | (Albania) Valdet Rama | 1 | 0 | 0 | 0 | 0 | 0 | 1 | 0 | 0 |
| 15 | 32 | FW | (Finland) Mikael Forssell | 0 | 0 | 0 | 1 | 0 | 0 | 1 | 0 | 0 |
| 15 | 34 | FW | (Germany) Konstantin Rausch | 1 | 0 | 0 | 0 | 0 | 0 | 1 | 0 | 0 |
| Total | | | | 67 | 3 | 0 | 3 | 0 | 0 | 70 | 3 | 0 |
