= 2009–10 in German football =

Football in Germany
- Season: 2009–10

Men's football
- Bundesliga: Bayern Munich
- 2. Bundesliga: 1. FC Kaiserslautern
- 3. Liga: VfL Osnabrück
- DFB-Pokal: Bayern Munich

Women's football
- Frauen-Bundesliga: Turbine Potsdam
- DFB-Pokal: FCR 2001 Duisburg

The 2009–10 season was the 100th season of competitive football in Germany. The season began on 1 July 2009 and concluded in May 2010.

== Diary of the season ==
24 July 2009 – The first 3rd Liga matches of the season are played.

3 August 2009 – Mainz sack coach Jørn Andersen in a surprise move after a Round 1 cup defeat against fourth-level side VfB Lübeck. U-19 coach Thomas Tuchel is appointed as his successor.

7 August 2009 – Defending Bundesliga champions Wolfsburg open the new Bundesliga season with a 2–0 win over Stuttgart. The first 2nd Bundesliga matches of the season are also played.

19 August 2009 – Edmund Becker is sacked as head coach of 2nd Bundesliga sides Karlsruher SC after four-and-a-half years. Reserves coach Markus Kauczinski is appointed as a caretaker. Just a few hours later, Dieter Hecking resigns as Hannover 96 head coach after a series of bad results during the preparation and early season stages. Hecking was in charge of Hannover since September 2006.

30 August 2009 – After acting as an interim coach for two matches, Andreas Bergmann is appointed as head coach for Hannover 96. Bergmann previously led the reserves team of the club.

3 September 2009 – Markus Schupp is appointed as new head coach of Karlsruher SC. Schupp signs a two-year contract with the club.

5 September 2009 – Jürgen Seeberger is sacked as head coach of Alemannia Aachen after 20 months. The club board cites "a situation where we had to act in order to save Alemannia from harm" as a reason. Assistant coach Willi Kronhardt is assigned as a caretaker.

10 September 2009 – The women's national football team wins the UEFA Women's Euro 2009. The team clinches its fifth title in a row and seventh overall by beating England, 6–2, in the Final at Olympic Stadium, Helsinki, Finland.

20 September 2009 – Women's Bundesliga seasons kicks off with the first matches.

20 September 2009 – Marcel Koller is sacked as head coach of VfL Bochum after a little more than four years. Assistant coach Frank Heinemann is assigned as a caretaker.
On the same day, Stefan Emmerling is also handed his working papers by Rot Weiss Ahlen after just five months with the club. U-19 coach Andreas Zimmermann is named as his successor.

22 September 2009 – Michael Krüger, former national coach of Sudan, is assigned as new head coach of Alemannia Aachen. Krüger signs a two-year contract with the club.

28 September 2009 – Lucien Favre is released from his duties as Hertha BSC coach after a series of bad results. Favre was in charge of the Berlin club since the beginning of the 2007–08 season. Karsten Heine is assigned as a caretaker.

3 October 2009 – Friedhelm Funkel takes the vacant head coaching position at Hertha BSC. Funkel signs a contract for the remainder of the season.

4 October 2009 – Tomas Oral resigns as head coach of FSV Frankfurt after two draws and six losses from the first eight matches of the 2. Bundesliga season. Oral was in charge of the club since the beginning of the 2006–07 season.

7 October 2009 – Hans-Jürgen Boysen signs a contract as FSV Frankfurt head coach for the remainder of the season after having stepped back as coach of nearby rivals Kickers Offenbach one day earlier.

10 October 2009 – The men's national football team qualifies for the 2010 FIFA World Cup after a 1–0 victory against Russia at Luzhniki Stadium, Moscow.

27 October 2009 – Heiko Herrlich replaces Frank Heinemann as manager of VfL Bochum who are in second to last in the Bundesliga.

30 October 2009 – MSV Duisburg and Peter Neururer mutually agree to end the 54-year-old's tenure as head coach of the team.

2 November 2009 – Milan Šašić assumes the vacant post as head coach of MSV Duisburg. Šašić had previously managed 1. FC Kaiserslautern and TuS Koblenz in the 2. Bundesliga.

10 November 2009 – Hannover 96 goalkeeper, Robert Enke commits suicide. Enke had been suffering from depression. As a mark of respect, the German national team cancels the friendly match against Chile scheduled for four days later.

6 December 2009 – VfB Stuttgart fires Markus Babbel who had been managing the club for just over a year. Swiss manager Christian Gross is hired to replace him.

13 December 2009 – The winter break in the Women's Bundesliga begins.

13 December 2009 – Facing relegation, TuS Koblenz relieves Uwe Rapolder of his duties as head coach. Rapolder had been at Koblenz since 2007.

20 December 2009 – The last matches before the winter break are played in the Bundesliga.

20 December 2009 – By mutual consent, Benno Möhlmann and SpVgg Greuther Fürth go their separate ways, ending Möhlmann's third spell as head coach in Fürth.

21 December 2009 – 2. Bundesliga breaks for winter.

21 December 2009 – Having achieved only three wins and three draws in their first half season since returning to the Bundesliga 1. FC Nürnerg dismiss manager Michael Oenning, under whom they had earned promotion the previous season.

22 December 2009 – Former Hannover 96 manager, Dieter Hecking takes over the post vacated by Michael Oenning just a day earlier. 1. FC Nürnberg is Hecking's third managerial post in the Bundesliga.

27 December 2009 – Both TuS Koblenz and SpVgg Greuther Fürth hire new head coaches. Petrik Sander, who had led Energie Cottbus to promotion, takes over in Koblenz, while Greuther Fürth hires Mike Büskens who previously had served as interim coach of FC Schalke 04 twice.

1 January 2010 – The winter transfer window opens, allowing clubs to add new players to their squads.

15 January 2010 – The Bundesliga and 2. Bundesliga resume after the winter break.

19 January 2010 – Hannover 96 sack manager Andreas Bergmann. Bergmann had assumed the post only five months earlier after the resignation of Dieter Hecking. Later the same day, Hannover announces that former FC Schalke manager, Mirko Slomka would replace Bergmann. Slomka had played for Hannover during his playing career, and had previously held positions as head coach of the youth team, and assistant coach for 96.

25 January 2010 – Defending German champions VfL Wolfsburg sack manager Armin Veh, after seven consecutive matches without a win. Reserve team manager Lorenz-Günther Köstner is appointed as interim coach.

1 February 2010 – With his team just one spot clear of the relegation zone, Jürgen Luginger resigns as manager of Rot-Weiß Oberhausen. Hans-Günter Bruns is appointed caretaker to replace him.

1 February 2010 – The winter transfer window closes. 44 players joined Bundesliga clubs, while 51 players left the top flight, and 12 players transferred from one bundesliga club to another. The 2. Bundesliga welcomed 42 new players, 37 players left the league, and four transferred internally.

22 February 2010 – After five straight games without a win and only three points clear of the relegation zone, F.C. Hansa Rostock sacks head coach Andreas Zachhuber. Zachhuber had been in charge of the club for just under a year. He is replaced by his assistant Thomas Finck.

11 March 2010 – With their chances of promotion diminishing, Arminia Bielefeld fires head coach Thomas Gerstner. Bielefeld had been Gerstner's first stint as head coach of a professional club. His asstants Frank Eulberg, and Jörg Böhme as well as Arminia sport director Detlev Dammeier take over the post in the interim.

16 March 2010 – Due to licensing irregularities the DFL deducts four points from Arminia Bielefeld.

26 April 2010 – Having won only one of their previous seven Bundesliga matches, Hamburger SV sack manager Bruno Labbadia, and places his assistant Ricardo Moniz in charge. Labbadia had assumed to post at the beginning of the season.

29 April 2010 – In 16th place and facing relegation, VfL Bochum sack manager Heiko Herrlich. The teams U-19 coach, Dariusz Wosz steps in as caretaker for the remainder of the season. Herrlich had replaced Marcel Koller earlier in the season.

8 May 2010 – The last Bundesliga matches are played. FC Bayern Munich win the championship, while VfL Bochum, and Hertha BSC are relegated.

8 May 2010 – The last matches in the 3rd Liga are played. VfL Osnabrück, and FC Erzgebirge Aue are promoted to 2. Bundesliga. Borussia Dortmund II, Wuppertaler SV Borussia, and Holstein Kiel had already been guaranteed relegation since 27 April.

9 May 2010 – The 2. Bundesliga season concludes. 1. FC Kaiserslautern, and FC St. Pauli are promoted to the Bundesliga, while TuS Koblenz, and Rot Weiss Ahlen are relegated to the 3rd Liga.

== Men's national team ==
The home team is on the left column; the away team is on the right column.

=== Friendly matches ===
5 September 2009
20:45 UTC+2

Germany	2–0	South Africa
Gómez 35'; Özil 77'	Report

BayArena, Leverkusen
Attendance: 29,569
Referee: Claudio Circhetta (Switzerland)

14 November 2009
20:30 UTC+1

Germany	Cancelled	Chile
	Report

RheinEnergieStadion, Cologne

18 November 2009^{1}
20:45 UTC+1

Germany	2–2	Ivory Coast
Podolski 11' (pen.), 90'	Report	Eboué 57'; Doumbia 85'

Veltins-Arena, Gelsenkirchen
Attendance: 33,015
Referee: Kuipers (Netherlands)

Note: The opponent for this date was changed after Egypt could have been, and ultimately was involved in a decision match against Algeria for a spot in the 2010 FIFA World Cup at the same date.

3 March 2010
20:45 UTC+1

Germany	0–1	Argentina
	Report	Higuaín 45'

Allianz Arena, Munich
Attendance: 65,152
Referee: Martin Atkinson (England)

13 May 2010
18:00 UTC+2

Germany	3–0	Malta
Cacau 16', 58'; Scicluna 61' (o.g.)	Report

New Tivoli, Aachen
Attendance: 27,000
Referee: Hamer (Luxemburg)

29 May 2010
20:00 UTC+2

Hungary	0–3	Germany
	Report	Podolski 5' (pen.); Gómez 69'; Cacau 72'

Budapest
Attendance: 15,000
Referee: Larsen (Denmark)

3 June 2010
20:30 UTC+2

Germany	3–1	Bosnia and Herzegovina
Lahm 50'; Schweinsteiger 73' (pen.), 77' (pen.)	Report	Džeko 15'

Commerzbank-Arena, Frankfurt
Attendance: 48,000
Referee: Nicola Rizzoli (Italy)

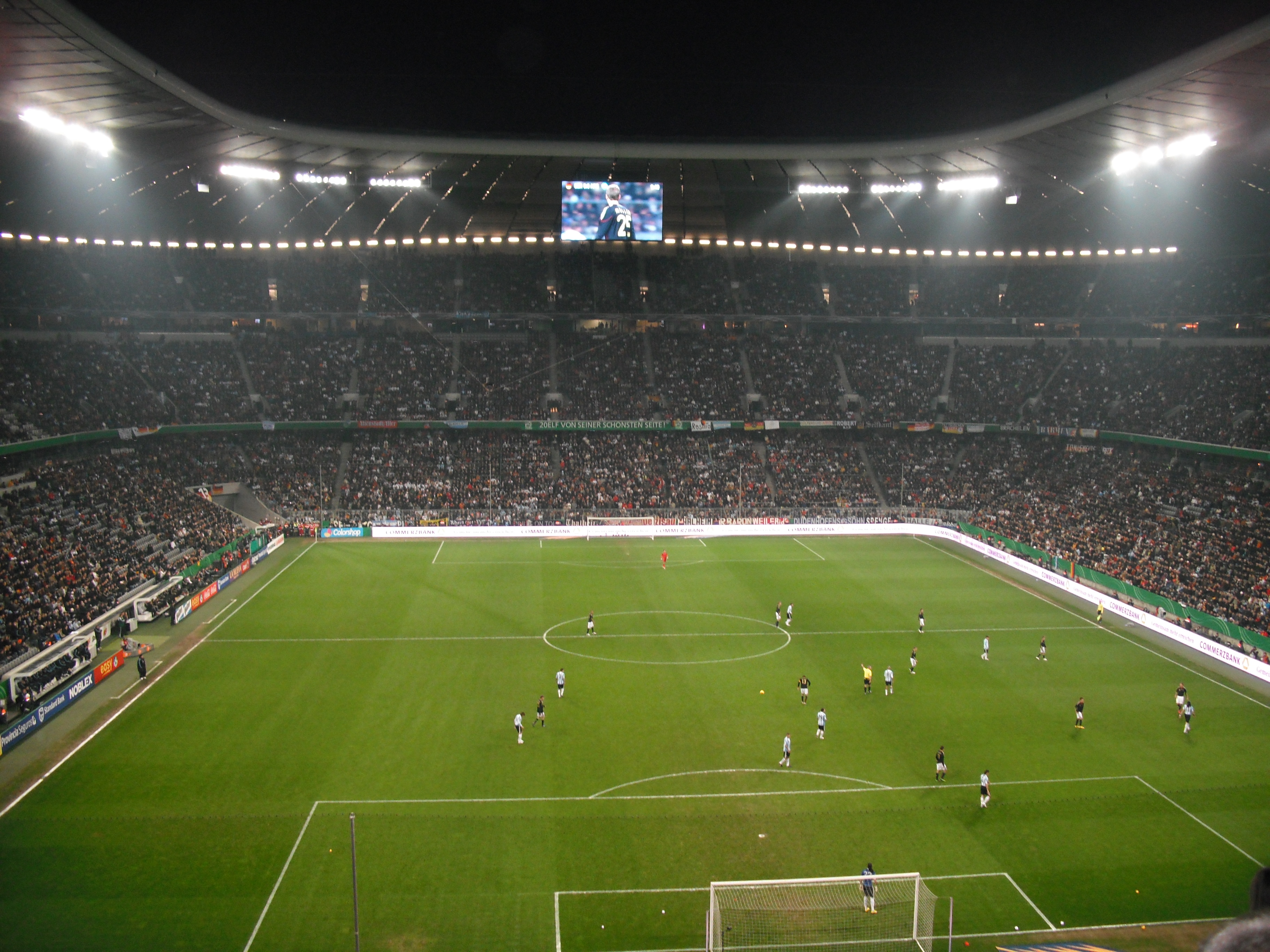
Germany v. Argentina in March 2010.

=== World Cup qualifiers ===
Germany qualified for the 2010 FIFA World Cup by finishing Group 4 of the UEFA qualification in first place.

12 August 2009
21:00 UTC+5

Azerbaijan	0–2	Germany
	Report	Schweinsteiger 12'; Klose 54'

Tofik Bakhramov Stadium, Baku
Attendance: 22,500
Referee: Alan Kelly (Republic of Ireland)

9 September 2009
20:45 UTC+2

Germany	4–0	Azerbaijan
Ballack 14' (pen.); Klose 55', 65'; Podolski 71'	Report

AWD-Arena, Hannover
Attendance: 35,369
Referee: Anastasios Kakos (Greece)

10 October 2009
19:00 UTC+4

Russia	0–1	Germany
	Report	Klose 35'

Luzhniki Stadium, Moscow
Attendance: 72,100
Referee: Massimo Busacca (Switzerland)

14 October 2009
18:00 UTC+2

Germany	1–1	Finland
Podolski 90'	Report	Johansson 11'

HSH Nordbank Arena, Hamburg
Attendance: 51,500
Referee: Martin Atkinson (England)

=== 2010 FIFA World Cup ===
13 June 2010
20:30 UTC+2

Germany	4–0	Australia
Podolski 8'; Klose 26'; Müller 68'; Cacau 70'	Report

Moses Mabhida Stadium, Durban
Attendance: 62,660
Referee: Marco Antonio Rodríguez (Mexico)

18 June 2010
13:30 UTC+2

Germany	0–1	Serbia
	Report	Jovanović 38'

Nelson Mandela Bay Stadium, Port Elizabeth
Attendance: 38,294
Referee: Alberto Undiano Mallenco (Spain)

23 June 2010
20:30 UTC+2

Ghana	0–1	Germany
	Report	Özil 60'

Soccer City, Johannesburg
Attendance: 83,391
Referee: Carlos Eugênio Simon (Brazil)

27 June 2010
16:00 UTC+2

Germany	4–1	England
Klose 20'; Podolski 32'; Müller 67', 70'	Report	Upson 37'

Free State Stadium, Bloemfontein
Attendance: 40,510
Referee: Jorge Larrionda (Uruguayan Football Association)

3 July 2010
16:00

Argentina	0–4	Germany
	Report	Müller 3'; Klose 68', 89'; Friedrich 74'

Cape Town Stadium, Cape Town
Attendance: 64,100
Referee: Ravshan Irmatov (Uzbekistan)

7 July 2010
20:30

Germany	0–1	Spain
	Report	Puyol 73'

Moses Mabhida Stadium, Durban
Attendance: 60,960
Referee: Viktor Kassai (Hungary)

10 July 2010
20:30

Uruguay	2–3	Germany
Cavani 28'; Forlán 51'	Report	Müller 19'; Jansen 56'; Khedira 82'

Nelson Mandela Bay Stadium, Port Elizabeth
Attendance: 36,254
Referee: Benito Archundia (Mexico)

== Women's national team ==
The home team is on the left column; the away team is on the right column.

=== Friendly matches ===
25 July 2009
18:00 UTC+2

Germany	6–0	Netherlands
Geurts 9' (o.g.); Grings 16'; Behringer 37'; Prinz 39'; Laudehr 57'; Okoyino da Mbabi 90'	Report

Rhein-Neckar-Arena, Sinsheim
Attendance: 22,537
Referee: Riem Hussein (Bad Harzburg)

29 July 2009
16:00 UTC+2

Germany	0–0	Japan
	Report

Carl-Benz-Stadion, Mannheim
Attendance: 10,158
Referee: Kurtes (Düsseldorf)

6 August 2009
17:25 UTC+2

Germany	3–1	Russia
Garefrekes 52'; Tsibutovich 63' (o.g.); Müller 90'	Report	Kurochkina 53'

Ruhrstadion, Bochum
Attendance: 13,303
Referee: Kunick (Leipzig)

29 October 2009
18:00 UTC+1

Germany	0–1	United States
	Report	Wambach 34'

Impuls Arena, Augsburg
Attendance: 28,367
Referee: Gaal (Hungary)

17 February 2010
16:30 UTC+1

Germany	3–0	North Korea
Bajramaj 21'; Laudehr 30'; Okoyino da Mbabi 50'	Report

MSV Arena, Duisburg
Attendance: 9,570
Referee: Guillemin (France)

24 February 2010
17:00 UTC+0

Germany	4–0	Denmark
Behringer 36'; Prinz 56'; Grings 58', 82'	Report

Parchal
Attendance: 200
Referee: Pye (Canada)

26 February 2010
17:00 UTC+0

Germany	7–0	Finland
Grings 32', 65', 70'; Popp 60', 66'; Keßler 70'; M. Müller 84'	Report

Parchal
Attendance: 200
Referee: Christina Pedersen (Norway)

1 March 2010
17:00 UTC+0

Germany	5–0	China
Garefrekes 2'; Mittag 16', 42'; Peter 75'; Zietz 90'	Report

Parchal
Attendance: 200
Referee: Godinez (Mexico)

3 March 2010
16:00 UTC+0

Germany	2–3	United States
Grings 40', 75'	Report	Lloyd 18'; Wambach 22'; Cheney 69'

Faro
Attendance: 250
Referee: Heikkinen (Finland)

22 May 2010
15:30 UTC-7

United States	4–0	Germany
Wambach 29' (pen.), 64'; O'Reilly 35'; Lilly 62'	Report

Cleveland
Attendance: 10,321
Referee: Margaret Domka (United States)

=== UEFA Women's Euro 2009 ===
Germany qualified for the UEFA Women's Euro 2009 in Finland. The team was drawn into Group B and faced Norway, France and Iceland. After ending the group as first-placed team, Germany successively defeated Italy, Norway and England for their fifth straight and seventh overall UEFA Women's Championship.

Group stage

24 August 2009
17:00 UTC+3

Germany	4–0	Norway
Bresonik 33' (pen.); Bajramaj 90', 90+4'; Mittag 90+2'	Report

Ratina Stadion, Tampere
Attendance: 6,552
Referee: Alexandra Ihringova (England)

27 August 2009
17:30 UTC+3

France	1–5	Germany
Thiney 51'	Report	Grings 9'; Krahn 17'; Behringer 45+1'; Bresonik 47' (pen.); Laudehr 90+1'

Ratina Stadion, Tampere
Attendance: 3,331
Referee: Kateryna Monzul (Ukraine)

30 August 2009
16:00 UTC+3

Germany	1–0	Iceland
Grings 50'	Report

Ratina Stadion, Tampere
Attendance: 3,101
Referee: Kirsi Heikkinen (Finland)

Quarterfinal

4 September 2009
16:00 UTC+3

Germany	2–1	Italy
Grings 4', 47'	Report	Panico 63'

Lahden Stadion, Lahti
Attendance: 1,866
Referee: Jenny Palmqvist (Sweden)

Semifinal

7 September 2009
19:00 UTC+3

Germany	3–1	Norway
Laudehr 59' da Mbabi 61'; Bajramaj 90+3'	Report	Herlovsen 10'

Finnair Stadium, Helsinki
Attendance: 2,765
Referee: Kirsi Heikkinen (Finland)

Final

10 September 2009
19:00 UTC+3

England	2–6	Germany
Carney 24'; K. Smith 55'	(Report)	Prinz 20', 76'; Behringer 22'; Kulig 51'; Grings 62', 73'

Olympic Stadium, Helsinki
Attendance: 15,877
Referee: Dagmar Damkova (Czech Republic)

== Deaths ==
- 20 August 2009 – Hans Biallas, 90, winger for TuS 48/99 Duisburg. He earned three caps for Germany in 1938 and 1939. Biallas was the last living player with international appearances for Germany before World War II.
- 30 August 2009 – Klaus-Peter Hanisch, 57, defender for Hertha BSC and Tennis Borussia Berlin, SC Wacker 04 Berlin, and Hertha Zehlendorf.
- 2 October 2009 – Rolf Rüssmann, 58, player for FC Schalke 04 and Borussia Dortmund and manager for Borussia Mönchengladbach and VfB Stuttgart. He earned twenty caps for Germany and was part of the team for the 1978 World Cup. Rüssmann died from prostate cancer shortly before his 59th birthday.
- 9 October 2009 – Horst Szymaniak, 75, midfielder for (among others) Wuppertaler SV, Karlsruher SC, Inter Milan and Tasmania Berlin. Szymaniak had 42 caps and two goals for Germany between 1956 and 1966 and was a regular for the 1958 and 1962 World Cup teams. His biggest success as a player was the victory in the 1964 European Cup Final.
- 10 November 2009 – Robert Enke, 32, goalkeeper for (among others) Carl Zeiss Jena, Borussia Mönchengladbach, Benfica, Barcelona and Hannover 96. (see above)
- 12 February 2010 – Werner Krämer, 70, midfielder for MSV Duisburg, VfL Bochum, and others. Member of 1966 West Germany world cup squad.
- 9 April 2010 – Zoltán Varga, 65, midfielder for Hertha BSC, Borussia Dortmund, and FC Augsburg.
- 11 April 2010 – Theodor Homann, 61, midfielder for Wuppertaler SV among others.
- 24 June 2010 – Jörg Berger, 65, striker for 1. FC Lokomotive Leipzig, and manager of (among others) the East German U-21 team, 1. FC Köln, Eintracht Frankfurt, and FC Schalke 04. In 1979, while managing the East German U-21, he fled to West Germany following a match against Yugoslavia.
