= Ghasemi =

Ghassemi (Persian: قاسمی) is a Persian/Iranian surname, derived from the given name "Ghasem" or "Ghassem". Other variations include "Ghasemi" and "Qasemi". It is especially common in Iran, United States and Great Britain. There are currently more than 2500 people with the last name "Ghassemi" living in the United States. Notable people with the surname include:

- Abbas Ghasemi, Iranian footballer
- Amir Ali Ghassemi, Iranian artist
- Komeil Ghasemi, Iranian wrestler
- Mehran Ghassemi, Iranian journalist
- Reza Ghassemi, Iranian writer
- Rubic Ghasemi-Nobakht, Iranian footballer
- Sebastian Ghasemi-Nobakht, German footballer

== See also ==
- Mirza Ghassemi
