= 2009–10 2. Bundesliga =

36th season of the second-tier football league in Germany

2. Bundesliga
- Season: 2009–10
- Champions: 1. FC Kaiserslautern
- Promoted: 1. FC Kaiserslautern; FC St. Pauli
- Relegated: Hansa Rostock (via play-off); TuS Koblenz; Rot Weiss Ahlen
- Matches: 306
- Goals: 808 (2.64 per match)
- Top goalscorer: Michael Thurk (23 goals)
- Biggest home win: St. Pauli 6–1 Koblenz; Duisburg 5–0 FSV Frankfurt
- Biggest away win: Aachen 0–5 St. Pauli; FSV Frankfurt 0–5 Greuther Fürth
- Highest scoring: Union Berlin 5–4 Paderborn; Greuther Fürth 4–5 Augsburg

The 2009–10 2. Bundesliga was the 36th season of the 2. Bundesliga, the second tier of Germany's football league. The season began on 7 August 2009 and ended on 9 May 2010. A winter break was held between 21 December 2009 and 14 January 2010, though the period has been reduced from six to three weeks.

== Teams ==
2008–09 2. Bundesliga champions SC Freiburg and runners-up 1. FSV Mainz 05 were promoted to the 2009–10 Bundesliga. They were replaced by Karlsruher SC and Arminia Bielefeld, who finished 17th and 18th respectively in the 2008–09 Bundesliga season.

FC Ingolstadt 04 and SV Wehen-Wiesbaden were relegated to the 2009–10 3. Liga following the 2008–09 season. They were replaced by 2008–09 3. Liga champions 1. FC Union Berlin and runners-up Fortuna Düsseldorf.

Two further spots were available through relegation/promotion play-offs. 1. FC Nürnberg gained promotion to the Bundesliga by beating Bundesliga side FC Energie Cottbus 5–0 on aggregate in the Bundesliga play-off, sending the team from the Eastern part of Germany to the second tier of German football. At the bottom end of the table, VfL Osnabrück lost both of their play-off matches against 3. Liga side SC Paderborn 07 and thus were relegated to the 2009–10 3. Liga.

=== Stadiums and locations ===
Several teams moved to different grounds for the 2009–10 season; Alemannia Aachen and Augsburg were relocating to new stadia, replacing their old structures, while FSV Frankfurt and Union Berlin returned to their original home grounds which had undergone renovation.

Location of teams in 2. Bundesliga 2009–10

Team	Location	Venue	Capacity	Avg. attendance
Alemannia Aachen	Aachen	New Tivoli	32,900	23,199
Rot-Weiß Ahlen	Ahlen	Wersestadion	12,500	4,600
FC Augsburg	Augsburg	Impuls Arena	30,660	16,061
1. FC Union Berlin	Berlin	Alte Försterei	18,955	14,534
Arminia Bielefeld	Bielefeld	Schüco-Arena	27,300	16,055
FC Energie Cottbus	Cottbus	Stadion der Freundschaft	22,528	11,079
MSV Duisburg	Duisburg	MSV-Arena	31,500	14,498
Fortuna Düsseldorf	Düsseldorf	Esprit Arena	51,500	28,007
FSV Frankfurt	Frankfurt am Main	Frankfurter Volksbank-Stadion	10,826	5,256
SpVgg Greuther Fürth	Fürth	Playmobil-Stadion	15,200	6,319
1. FC Kaiserslautern	Kaiserslautern	Fritz Walter Stadion	48,500	31,360
Karlsruher SC	Karlsruhe	Wildparkstadion	29,699	18,178
TuS Koblenz	Koblenz	Stadion Oberwerth	15,000	7,346
TSV 1860 Munich	Munich	Allianz Arena	69,000	24,844
Rot-Weiß Oberhausen	Oberhausen	Niederrheinstadion	21,318	6,631
SC Paderborn 07	Paderborn	Energieteam Arena	15,000	9,005
F.C. Hansa Rostock	Rostock	DKB-Arena	29,000	13,800
FC St. Pauli	Hamburg	Millerntor-Stadion	23,201	21,882

=== Personnel and sponsorship ===
Team	Head coach	Team captain	Kitmaker	Shirt sponsor
Alemannia Aachen	(Germany) Michael Krüger	(Germany) Benjamin Auer	Nike	Aachen Münchener
Rot Weiss Ahlen	(Germany) Christian Hock	(Germany) Daniel Thioune	Jako	Reflex
FC Augsburg	(Netherlands) Jos Luhukay	(Germany) Lars Müller	Do You Football	Impuls
1. FC Union Berlin	(Germany) Uwe Neuhaus	(Germany) Marco Gebhardt	Do You Football	KFZTeile24
Arminia Bielefeld	(Germany) Detlev Dammeier (Germany) Frank Eulberg (Germany) Jörg Böhme	(Germany) Rüdiger Kauf	Saller	Krombacher
FC Energie Cottbus	(Germany) Claus-Dieter Wollitz	(Germany) Timo Rost	Saller	enviaM
MSV Duisburg	(Croatia) Milan Šašić	(Germany) Tom Starke	uhlsport	Rheinpower
Fortuna Düsseldorf	(Germany) Norbert Meier	(Germany) Andreas Lambertz	Puma	Sparkasse Düsseldorf
FSV Frankfurt	(Germany) Hans-Jürgen Boysen	(Bosnia and Herzegovina) Sead Mehić	Legea	Hyundai
SpVgg Greuther Fürth	(Germany) Michael Büskens	(Croatia) Marino Biliskov	Jako	Karstadt Quelle Versicherungen
1. FC Kaiserslautern	(Germany) Marco Kurz	(Germany) Martin Amedick	Do You Football	Deutsche Vermögensberatung
Karlsruher SC	(Germany) Markus Schupp	(Georgia (country)) Alexander Iashvili	Nike	EnBW
TuS Koblenz	(Germany) Petrik Sander	(Germany) Manuel Hartmann	Nike	Rhein-Zeitung
TSV 1860 Munich	(Germany) Ewald Lienen	(Germany) Benjamin Lauth	erima	trenkwalder
Rot-Weiß Oberhausen	(Germany) Hans-Günter Bruns (Interim)	(Germany) Benjamin Reichert	uhlsport	Vatro
SC Paderborn 07	(Germany) Andre Schubert	(Germany) Markus Krösche	Puma	Finke
F.C. Hansa Rostock	(Germany) Marco Kostmann	(Denmark) Martin Retov	Masita	Windstärke 11
FC St. Pauli	(Germany) Holger Stanislawski	(Germany) Fabio Morena	Do You Football	Dacia

=== Managerial changes ===
Team	Outgoing manager	Manner of departure	Date of vacancy	Replaced by	Date of appointment	Position in table
Arminia Bielefeld	(Germany) Jörg Berger	Mutual consent	30 June 2009	(Germany) Thomas Gerstner	1 July 2009	Pre-season
Energie Cottbus	(Slovenia) Bojan Prašnikar	Mutual consent	30 June 2009	(Germany) Claus-Dieter Wollitz	1 July 2009	Pre-season
1. FC Kaiserslautern	(Germany) Alois Schwartz	End of tenure as caretaker	30 June 2009	(Germany) Marco Kurz	1 July 2009	Pre-season
Karlsruher SC	(Germany) Edmund Becker	Sacked	19 August 2009	(Germany) Markus Schupp	3 September 2009	14th
Alemannia Aachen	(Germany) Jürgen Seeberger	Sacked	5 September 2009	(Germany) Michael Krüger	22 September 2009	12th
Rot Weiss Ahlen	(Germany) Stefan Emmerling	Sacked	20 September 2009	(Germany) Christian Hock	14 October 2009	17th
FSV Frankfurt	(Germany) Tomas Oral	Resigned	4 October 2009	(Germany) Hans-Jürgen Boysen	7 October 2009	17th
MSV Duisburg	(Germany) Peter Neururer	Mutual Consent	30 October 2009	(Croatia) Milan Šašić	2 November 2009	9th
TuS Koblenz	(Germany) Uwe Rapolder	Sacked	13 December 2009	(Germany) Petrik Sander	27 December 2009	16th
SpVgg Greuther Fürth	(Germany) Benno Möhlmann	Sacked	20 December 2009	(Germany) Michael Büskens	27 December 2009	15th
Rot-Weiß Oberhausen	(Germany) Jürgen Luginger	Resigned	1 February 2010	(Germany) Hans-Günter Bruns (Interim)	1 February 2010	15th
F.C. Hansa Rostock	(Germany) Andreas Zachhuber	Sacked	22 February 2010	(Germany) Marco Kostmann	16 March 2010	14th
Arminia Bielefeld	(Germany) Thomas Gerstner	Sacked	11 March 2010	(Germany) Detlev Dammeier (Germany) Frank Eulberg (Germany) Jörg Böhme	11 March 2010	5th

== League table ==
Pos	Team	Pld	W	D	L	GF	GA	GD	Pts	Promotion, qualification or relegation
1	1. FC Kaiserslautern (C, P)	34	19	10	5	56	28	+28	67	Promotion to Bundesliga
2	FC St. Pauli (P)	34	20	4	10	72	37	+35	64	Promotion to Bundesliga
3	FC Augsburg	34	17	11	6	60	40	+20	62	Qualification for promotion play-offs
4	Fortuna Düsseldorf	34	17	8	9	48	31	+17	59	
5	SC Paderborn	34	14	9	11	49	49	0	51	
6	MSV Duisburg	34	14	8	12	51	46	+5	50	
7	Arminia Bielefeld	34	16	5	13	48	41	+7	49 (Note: Due to licensing irregularities the DFL deducted four points from Arminia Bielefeld.)	
8	1860 Munich	34	14	6	14	43	45	−2	48	
9	Energie Cottbus	34	13	8	13	55	49	+6	47	
10	Karlsruher SC	34	13	7	14	43	45	−2	46	
11	Greuther Fürth	34	12	8	14	51	50	+1	44	
12	Union Berlin	34	11	11	12	42	45	−3	44	
13	Alemannia Aachen	34	11	10	13	37	41	−4	43	
14	Rot-Weiß Oberhausen	34	12	5	17	38	52	−14	41	
15	FSV Frankfurt	34	9	11	14	29	50	−21	38	
16	Hansa Rostock (R)	34	10	6	18	33	45	−12	36	Qualification for relegation play-offs
17	TuS Koblenz (R)	34	7	10	17	35	60	−25	31	Relegation to 3. Liga
18	Rot Weiss Ahlen (R)	34	5	7	22	19	55	−36	22	Relegation to 3. Liga

Source: Bundesliga.de
Rules for classification: 1) points; 2) goal difference; 3) number of goals scored.
(C) Champions; (P) Promoted; (R) Relegated

== Results ==
Home \ Away	AAC	RWA	FCA	UNB	DSC	FCE	DUI	F95	FSV	SGF	FCK	KSC	KOB	M60	RWO	SCP	ROS	STP
Alemannia Aachen	—	0–2	4–0	1–4	2–1	1–1	1–1	0–1	3–0	2–2	0–3	3–1	1–1	2–0	2–1	1–1	1–0	0–5
Rot Weiss Ahlen	0–1	—	1–3	3–2	0–1	0–4	0–1	1–4	0–0	0–1	0–1	1–3	0–2	0–0	1–0	0–0	0–2	0–2
FC Augsburg	0–1	3–1	—	1–1	3–1	3–1	2–0	2–0	2–0	1–1	4–1	1–1	1–1	1–0	2–2	3–0	5–2	3–2
Union Berlin	0–0	2–1	0–0	—	3–0	1–1	0–1	1–0	1–0	1–2	0–2	1–1	3–2	1–1	1–0	5–4	1–0	2–1
Arminia Bielefeld	1–0	2–0	1–2	1–1	—	2–0	1–2	1–1	2–1	2–1	1–2	0–1	4–2	0–1	2–1	3–0	3–1	1–0
Energie Cottbus	3–1	4–1	3–1	4–2	4–1	—	0–1	4–2	3–0	1–3	1–2	2–4	1–1	1–0	3–0	1–2	0–0	0–1
MSV Duisburg	0–2	2–2	2–2	3–1	0–3	2–2	—	3–0	5–0	1–1	1–1	0–1	4–1	0–1	2–2	2–3	3–1	0–2
Fortuna Düsseldorf	0–0	4–0	1–1	1–0	3–2	2–1	2–0	—	4–1	0–0	0–0	1–0	1–0	2–0	2–0	3–0	3–1	1–0
FSV Frankfurt	1–1	0–0	1–1	2–1	0–0	0–0	1–2	2–0	—	0–5	1–1	2–1	1–1	3–2	1–0	0–0	0–1	2–3
Greuther Fürth	0–2	3–1	4–5	0–0	2–4	1–0	0–1	2–1	4–0	—	3–0	1–4	1–2	1–2	4–0	1–1	1–0	1–4
1. FC Kaiserslautern	1–1	0–0	1–1	1–1	1–0	4–1	4–1	0–2	1–1	2–1	—	2–0	3–0	4–0	3–1	3–0	0–1	3–0
Karlsruher SC	1–1	1–0	1–0	3–2	0–1	0–2	0–1	1–1	2–0	1–1	1–3	—	2–1	2–0	1–1	1–2	2–1	0–4
TuS Koblenz	1–0	1–1	0–1	1–1	3–2	0–2	0–3	1–0	0–1	2–0	2–2	2–2	—	2–2	0–1	2–1	0–0	1–5
1860 Munich	3–2	0–1	1–0	2–0	3–1	1–2	3–1	2–2	2–1	3–1	0–1	1–3	2–0	—	2–2	0–0	3–0	2–1
Rot-Weiß Oberhausen	1–0	2–0	0–3	0–3	0–0	4–1	1–0	0–1	1–3	0–1	2–1	1–0	2–0	0–1	—	3–2	2–1	1–3
SC Paderborn	2–1	2–0	2–2	3–0	0–2	5–1	1–3	1–1	0–2	1–0	0–0	2–0	2–1	3–1	1–2	—	2–2	2–1
Hansa Rostock	2–0	0–1	0–1	0–0	1–1	0–0	3–1	2–1	1–2	4–0	0–1	2–1	2–1	2–1	0–2	1–2	—	0–2
FC St. Pauli	1–0	2–1	3–0	3–0	0–1	1–1	2–2	2–1	0–0	2–2	1–2	2–1	6–1	3–1	5–3	1–2	2–0	—

Source: DFB
Legend: Blue = home team win; Yellow = draw; Red = away team win.

== Promotion/relegation play-offs ==
The 16th-placed Hansa Rostock faced the third-placed 3. Liga team FC Ingolstadt for a two-legged play-off. FC Ingolstadt, as the winner on aggregated score after both matches earned a spot in the 2010–11 2. Bundesliga. The matches took place on 14 and 17 May, with the 3. Liga club hosting the first leg at home.

14 May 2010
20:30 CEST

FC Ingolstadt	1–0	Hansa Rostock
Wohlfarth 73'	Report (in German)

Tuja-Stadion
Attendance: 7,538
Referee: Peter Gagelmann (Bremen)

17 May 2010
20:30 CEST

Hansa Rostock	0–2	FC Ingolstadt
	Report (in German)	Gerber 8', 78'

DKB-Arena
Attendance: 22,000
Referee: Knut Kircher (Rottenburg)

Hansa Rostock was relegated to 3. Liga and Ingolstadt was promoted to 2. Bundesliga for the 2010–11 season.

== Statistics ==
=== Top goalscorers ===
Source: kicker magazine

23 goals

- (Germany) Michael Thurk (FC Augsburg)

20 goals

- (Germany) Marius Ebbers (FC St. Pauli)

15 goals

- (Slovakia) Erik Jendrišek (1. FC Kaiserslautern)
- (Germany) Christopher Nöthe (Greuther Fürth)
- (Turkey) Mahir Sağlık (SC Paderborn)

14 goals

- (Germany) Benjamin Auer (Alemannia Aachen)

13 goals

- (Austria) Martin Harnik (Fortuna Düsseldorf)

12 goals

- (Tunisia) Sami Allagui (Greuther Fürth)
- (Italy) Giovanni Federico (Arminia Bielefeld)
- (Romania) Emil Jula (Energie Cottbus)

=== Top assistants ===
Source: kicker magazine

12 assists

- (Italy) Giovanni Federico (Arminia Bielefeld)
- (Romania) Emil Jula (Energie Cottbus)
- (Germany) Christian Tiffert (MSV Duisburg)

11 assists

- (Germany) Alexander Bugera (1. FC Kaiserslautern)
- (France) Ibrahima Traoré (FC Augsburg)

10 assists

- (Germany) Marco Christ (Fortuna Düsseldorf)
- (Germany) Deniz Naki (FC St. Pauli)

9 assists

- (Tunisia) Sami Allagui (Greuther Fürth)
- (Germany) Marius Ebbers (FC St. Pauli)
- (Germany) Jürgen Gjasula (FSV Frankfurt)
- (Cameroon) Marcel Ndjeng (FC Augsburg)
- (Turkey) Mahir Sağlık (SC Paderborn)
