= Dreieck Karlsruhe =

Half-stack interchange in Germany

- Autobahndreieck Karlsruhe, AD Karlsruhe
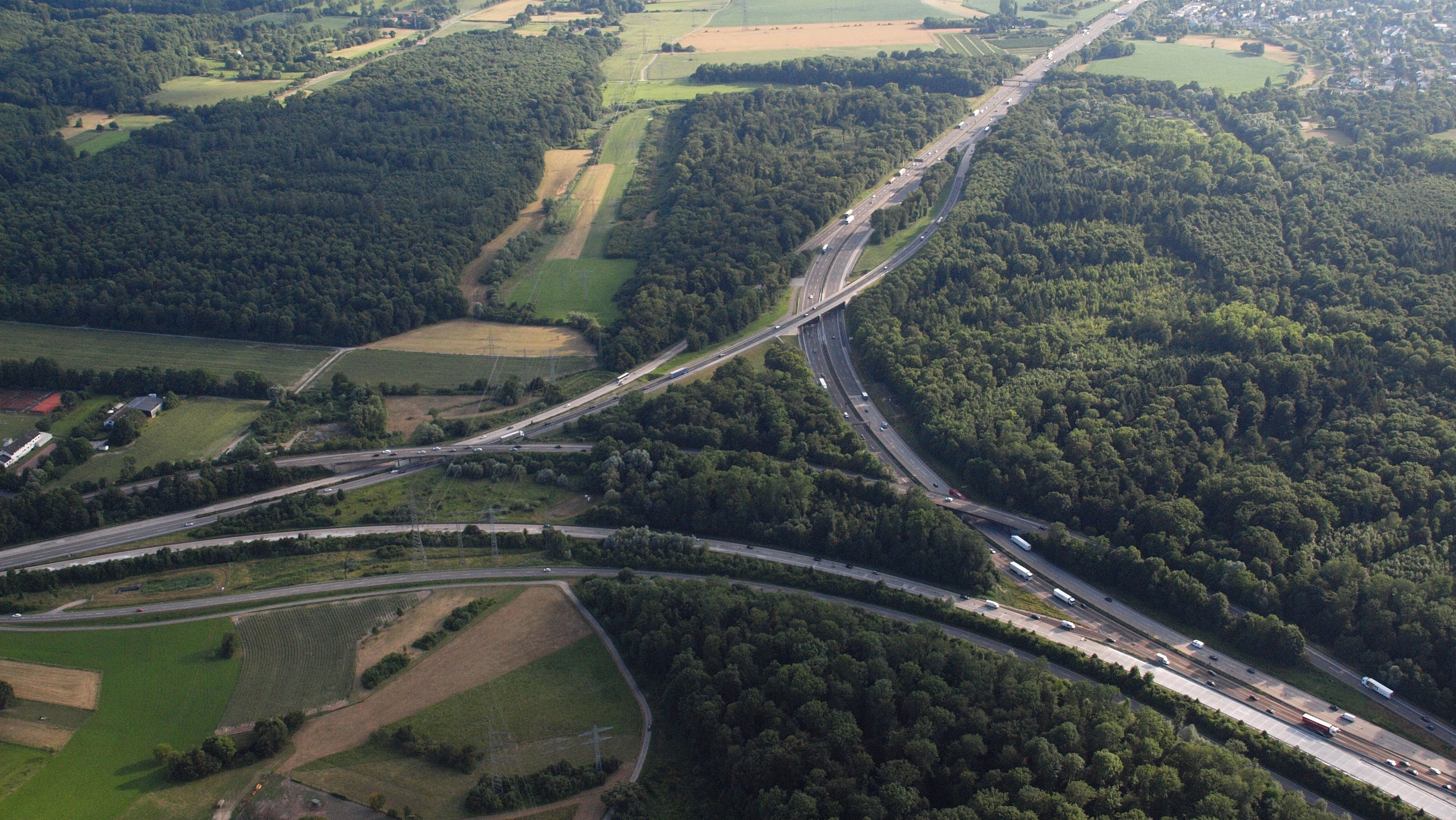
- Interactive map of Dreieck Karlsruhe

Location
- Karlsruhe, Germany
- Coordinates: 48°58′23.25″N 8°26′11.05″E: A 8; A 5

Construction
- Type: Half-stack interchange
- Lanes: 2x3/2x3
- Opened: 1938 (Last rebuilt 2011)

The Dreieck Karlsruhe (German: Autobahndreieck Karlsruhe, abbreviated AD Karlsruhe) is a half-stack interchange in the German state of Baden-Württemberg.

The motorway interchange terminates the section of A8 coming from Munich to the east, by connecting with A5. A5 travels from the north at Hattenbacher Dreieck to the south at the Swiss border near Basel.

== Geography ==
The motorway interchange is within the city limits of Karlsruhe. Nearby towns are Waldbronn and Ettlingen. The interchange lies 5 km southeast of the city centre of Karlsruhe.

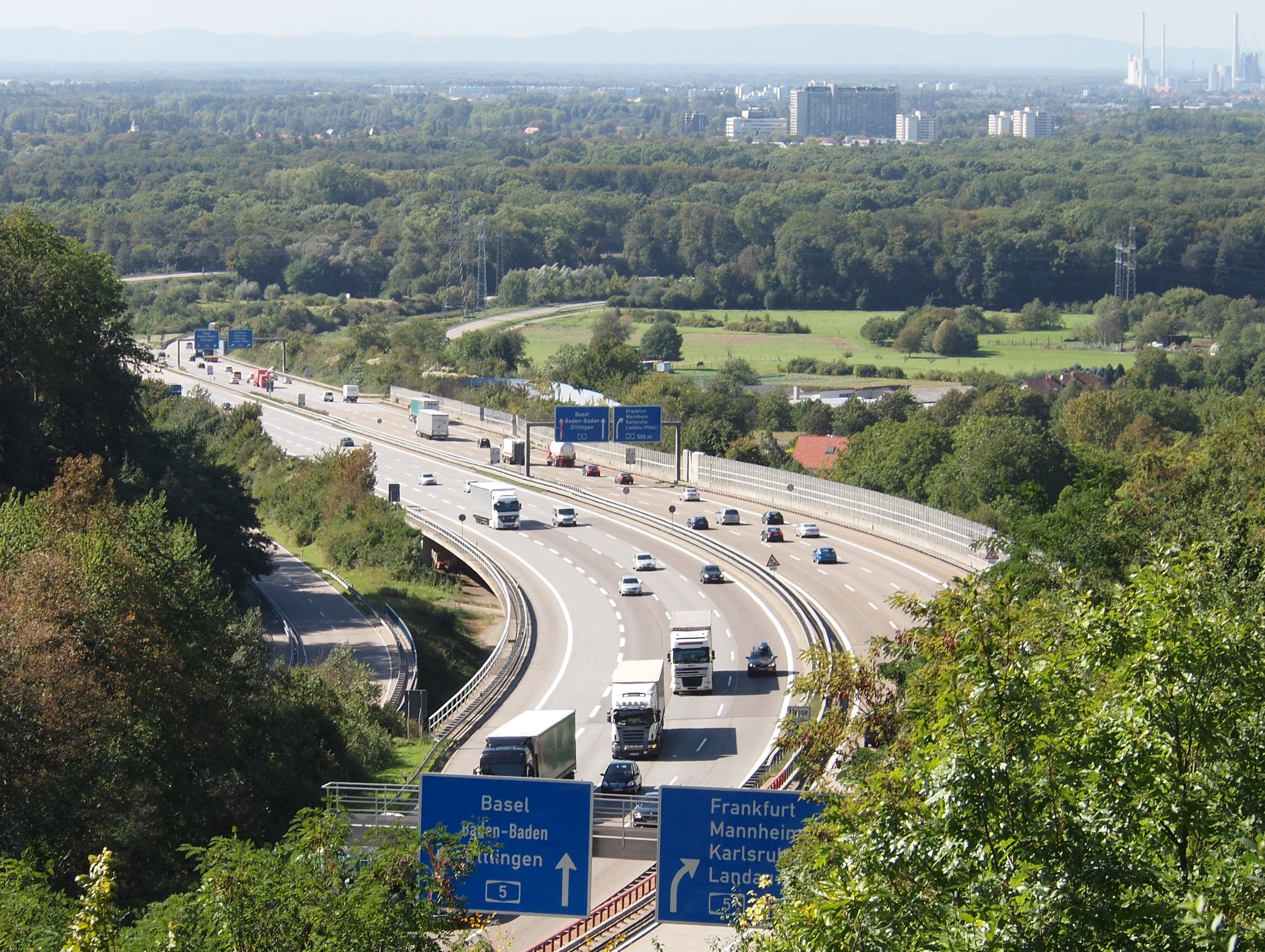
Dreieck Karlsruhe (2011)

== History ==
=== Before the Second World War ===
The motorway interchange was built together with the A8 to connect to Salzburg. The connection had to be ready before the Second World War. Construction began in 1936 and opened to traffic in 1938.

=== Karlsruher Dreiecksrennen ===
Between 1946 and 1951 they held motor races at the interchange, called the Karlsruher Dreiecksrennen.

=== Reconstruction 2011 ===
The bridgespan in the connection Stuttgart–Basel over the A 5 was newly built between August 2011 and the beginning of 2013. The old connecting bridge was torn down because of its sorry state. The new bridge was built next to the old one with an altered radius. The new connection now has two lanes instead of one.

== Road layout near the interchange ==
Near the motorway interchange the A 5 as well as the A 8 have a 1x3 layout. All connections in the interchange have two lanes.

The interchange is built as a half-stack interchange.

== Traffic near the interchange ==
Approximately 206,000 vehicles use the interchange on a daily basis, which makes it the most-used motorway interchange in Baden-Württemberg.

From	To	Average daily traffic	Percentage of heavy traffic
AS Karlsruhe-Mitte (A 5)	AD Karlsruhe	140,100	14.3%
AD Karlsruhe	AS Ettlingen (A 5)	84,800	14.5%
AD Karlsruhe	AS Karlsbad (A 8)	84,800	13.6%
