= Sebastian Ghasemi-Nobakht =

Iranian footballer (born 1985)

Personal information
- Full name: Sebastian Ghasemi-Nobakht
- Date of birth: 11 October 1985 (age 41)
- Place of birth: Göttingen, West Germany
- Height: 1.70 m (5 ft 7 in)
- Position: Striker

Team information
- Current team: CFC Hertha 06

Youth career
- 2000: TSV Waake/JSG Ost
- 2000–2001: SVG Göttingen
- 2001–2004: VfL Wolfsburg

Senior career*
| Years | Team | Apps | (Gls) |
| 2004–2006 | SCW Göttingen | | |
| 2006 | Eintracht Northeim | 1 | (3) |
| 2007–2009 | VfB Oldenburg | 80 | (30) |
| 2009–2010 | Greuther Fürth | 12 | (2) |
| 2009–2010 | Greuther Fürth II | 12 | (3) |
| 2010–2011 | Rot Weiss Ahlen | 22 | (2) |
| 2012 | I. SC Göttingen 05 | 2 | (0) |
| 2013 | BFC Viktoria 89 | 11 | (3) |
| 2014–2017 | CFC Hertha 06 | 54 | (21) |
| 2017–2018 | Berlin Türkspor 1965 | 19 | (11) |
| 2018– | CFC Hertha 06 | 25 | (6) |
- * Club domestic league appearances and goals as of 15 May 2019 ‡ National team caps and goals as of 25 July 2009

Sebastian Ghasemi-Nobakht (Persian: سباستین قاسمی نوبخت, born 11 October 1985, in Göttingen) is an Iranian footballer who plays as a striker for CFC Hertha 06.

== Personal life ==
Sebastian's younger brother Rubic is also a footballer.

== Career statistics ==
As of 16 May 2019

Appearances and goals by club, season and competition
| Club | Season | League | | | Cup | | Other | | Total | |
| Club | Season | Division | Apps | Goals | Apps | Goals | Apps | Goals | Apps | Goals |
|---|---|---|---|---|---|---|---|---|---|---|
| Eintracht Northeim | 2006–07 | Oberliga | 1 | 3 | 0 | 0 | – | | 1 | 3 |
| VfB Oldenburg | 2006–07 | Oberliga | 14 | 3 | 0 | 0 | – | | 14 | 3 |
| VfB Oldenburg | 2007–08 | Oberliga | 33 | 11 | 0 | 0 | – | | 33 | 11 |
| VfB Oldenburg | 2008–09 | Oberliga | 33 | 16 | 0 | 0 | 2 | 0 | 35 | 16 |
| VfB Oldenburg | Total | | 80 | 30 | 0 | 0 | 2 | 0 | 82 | 30 |
| Greuther Fürth II | 2009–10 | Regionalliga | 12 | 3 | 0 | 0 | – | | 12 | 3 |
| Greuther Fürth | 2009–10 | 2. Bundesliga | 12 | 2 | 0 | 0 | – | | 12 | 2 |
| Rot Weiss Ahlen | 2010–11 | 3. Liga | 22 | 2 | 1 | 0 | 1 | 0 | 24 | 2 |
| I. SC Göttingen 05 | 2011–12 | Oberliga | 2 | 0 | 0 | 0 | – | | 2 | 0 |
| BFC Viktoria 89 | 2012–13 | Oberliga | 11 | 3 | 0 | 0 | – | | 11 | 3 |
| CFC Hertha 06 | 2014–15 | Berlin-Liga | 22 | 12 | 0 | 0 | 1 | 0 | 23 | 12 |
| CFC Hertha 06 | 2015–16 | Oberliga | 19 | 8 | 0 | 0 | 1 | 0 | 20 | 8 |
| CFC Hertha 06 | 2016–17 | Oberliga | 13 | 1 | 0 | 0 | 0 | 0 | 13 | 1 |
| CFC Hertha 06 | Total | | 54 | 21 | 0 | 0 | 2 | 0 | 56 | 21 |
| Berlin Türkspor 1965 | 2016–17 | Landesliga | 14 | 9 | 0 | 0 | – | | 14 | 9 |
| Berlin Türkspor 1965 | 2017–18 | Berlin-Liga | 5 | 2 | 0 | 0 | 2 | 1 | 7 | 3 |
| Berlin Türkspor 1965 | Total | | 19 | 11 | 0 | 0 | 2 | 1 | 21 | 12 |
| CFC Hertha 06 | 2018–19 | Oberliga | 25 | 6 | 0 | 0 | 1 | 0 | 26 | 6 |
| Career total | | | 238 | 81 | 1 | 0 | 8 | 1 | 247 | 82 |
