= Rubic Ghasemi-Nobakht =

Iranian footballer (born 1987)

Personal information
- Date of birth: 27 July 1987 (age 39)
- Place of birth: Göttingen, West Germany
- Height: 1.79 m (5 ft 10 in)
- Position: Striker

Youth career
- –2004: Grün-Weiß Hagenbeck
- 2004–2006: Hannover 96

Senior career*
Years	Team	Apps	(Gls)
2007–2008	Eintracht Northeim	30	(24)
2008–2010	Hannover 96 II	20	(4)
2010	Hannover 96	1	(0)
2010–2011	FC Oberneuland	16	(7)
2012	1. SC Göttingen 05	13	(2)
2012–2013	Lichterfelder FC	25	(7)
2013–2014	CFC Hertha 06	1	(0)
2014	Berliner AK 07	8	(2)
- * Club domestic league appearances and goals

Rubic Ghasemi-Nobakht (Persian: روبیک قاسمی نوبخت; born 27 July 1987) is an Iranian former professional footballer who played as a striker.

== Personal life ==
Rubic's elder brother Sebastian is also a footballer.

== Career statistics ==
Appearances and goals by club, season and competition
Club	Season	League		Cup		Other		Total		
Club	Season	Division	Apps	Goals	Apps	Goals	Apps	Goals	Apps	Goals
Eintracht Northeim	2007–08	Oberliga	30	24	0	0	–		30	24
Hannover 96 II	2008–09	Regionalliga Nord	5	0	0	0	–		5	0
Hannover 96 II	2009–10	Regionalliga Nord	15	4	0	0	–		15	4
Hannover 96 II	Total		20	4	0	0	–		20	4
Hannover 96	2009–10	Bundesliga	1	0	0	0	–		1	0
FC Oberneuland	2010–11	Regionalliga Nord	16	7	1	0	2	0	19	7
1. SC Göttingen 05	2011–12	Oberliga	13	2	0	0	–		13	2
Lichterfelder FC	2012–13	Oberliga	25	7	0	0	–		25	7
CFC Hertha 06	2014–15	Berlin-Liga	1	0	0	0	–		1	0
Berliner AK 07	2014–15	Regionalliga Nordost	8	2	0	0	1	0	9	2
Career total			114	46	1	0	3	0	118	46
