= Waldbronn =

- Municipality
- Coat of arms

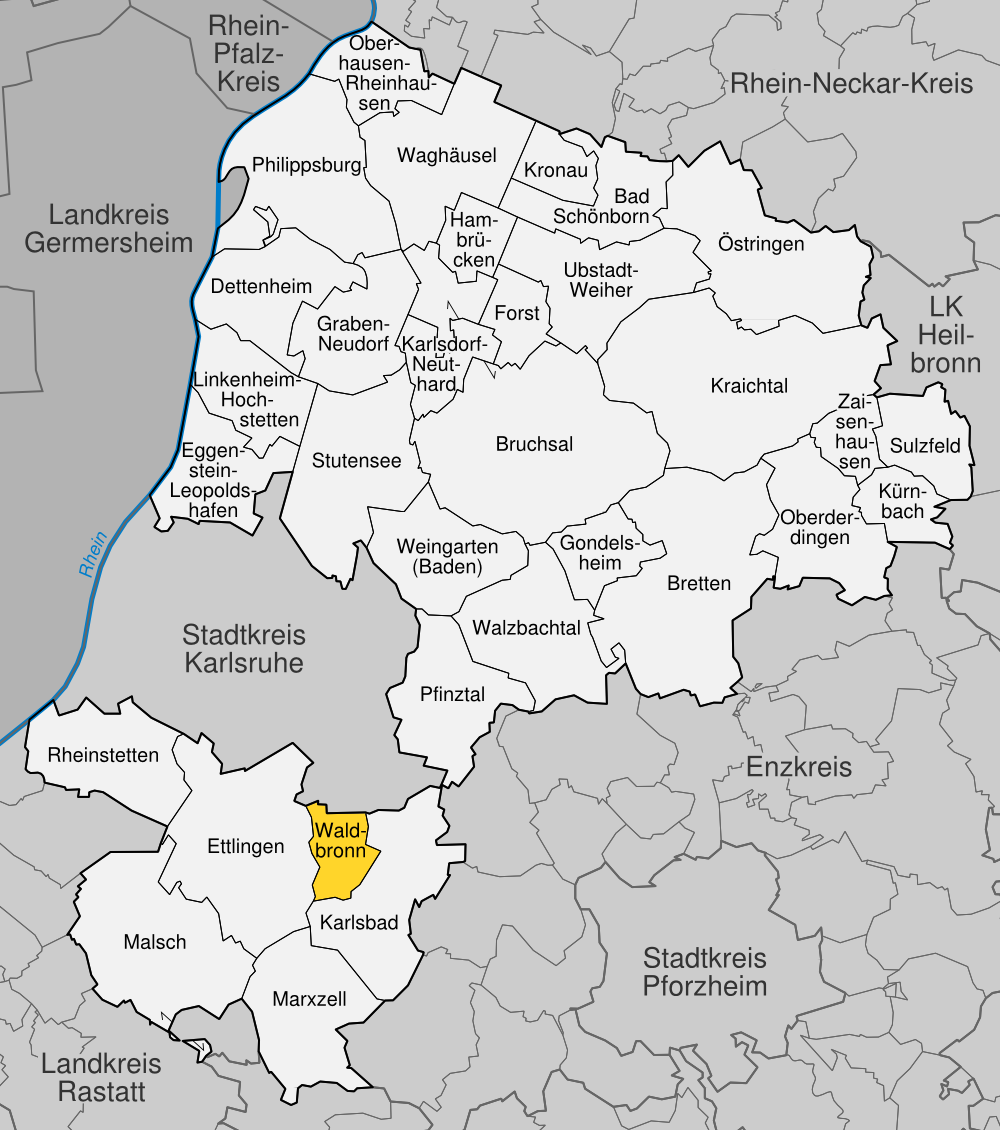
- Location of Waldbronn within Karlsruhe district
- Interactive map of Waldbronn
- Location within Germany Location within Baden-Württemberg
- Coordinates: 48°55′28″N 8°28′33″E
- Country: Germany
- State: Baden-Württemberg
- Admin. region: Karlsruhe
- District: Karlsruhe
- Subdivisions: 3

Government
  - Mayor (2022–30): Christian Stalf (CDU)

Area
  - Total: 11.35 km^{2} (4.38 sq mi)
- Elevation: 230–300 m (750–980 ft)

Population (2025-12-31)
  - Total: 13,799
  - Density: 1,216/km^{2} (3,149/sq mi)
- Time zone: UTC+01:00 (CET)
  - Summer (DST): UTC+02:00 (CEST)
- Postal codes: 76333–76337
- Dialling codes: 07243
- Vehicle registration: KA
- Website: www.waldbronn.de

Waldbronn is a municipality in the district of Karlsruhe, in Baden-Württemberg, Germany. It is situated in the northern Black Forest, 11 kilometres (7 miles) southeast of Karlsruhe.

== Geography ==
Waldbronn is located at the border of the Alb-Pfinz-Plateau in the valley of the river Alb.

== History ==
Waldbronn was founded in 1972 as a result of a municipal restructuring, when the communities Busenbach and Reichenbach merged. A year earlier the community of Etzenrot had been merged with Reichenbach already.

The three communities are first mentioned in historic documents in 1292.

In January 1994 Waldbronn was awarded the official status of "Ort mit Heilquellen-Kurbetrieb", indicating the medicinal benefits of its hot wells.

== Transport ==
Reichenbach is connected to the city of Karlsruhe by S 11 services operating over the Busenbach–Ittersbach railway, an electric railway that forms part of the Karlsruhe Stadtbahn.

== Events ==
Every year in September a party takes place where the mayor opens the party. It is called Kurparkfest. In 2025 the party took place on 6 and 7 September. There’s a morning run for kids around the lake for a short distance and a prize. Then party takes place till 1 am. There’s live music, concerts, lots of food and alcohol. Many traditional German dishes and drinks are served. A lot of youth is coming to celebrate.

== Sons and daughters ==
- Edmund Becker (born 1956), German football player and coach
- Max Giesinger (born 1988), German singer
