= Hendrik Hahne =

German footballer

Personal information
- Date of birth: 15 April 1986 (age 40)
- Place of birth: Gronau an der Leine, West Germany
- Height: 1.73 m (5 ft 8 in)
- Position: Midfielder

Team information
- Current team: TSV Bemerode
- Number: 7

Youth career
- 1993–1998: VfV Hildesheim
- 1998–2000: Duinger SC
- 2000–2005: Hannover 96

Senior career*
Years	Team	Apps	(Gls)
2004–2010	Hannover 96 II	144	(21)
2005–2010	Hannover 96	7	(0)
2010–2011	SV Babelsberg 03	22	(1)
2011–2012	1. FC Wunstorf		
2014–	TSV Bemerode	1	(0)
- * Club domestic league appearances and goals as of 23 June 2015

Hendrik Hahne (born 15 April 1986 in Gronau) is a German footballer who plays for TSV Bemerode.

== Career ==
He joined Hannover 96 in 2000 as a youth player, progressing through the ranks until he finally made his Bundesliga debut on 10 September 2005 in a 2–0 win over Eintracht Frankfurt. He managed seven appearances during this season, but did not feature at all during the 2006–07 campaign.

== Trivia ==
- He is nicknamed "Chicken" within the club, owing to his surname (Hahn meaning rooster in German).
- In 2005, he completed a qualification in business retail.
