= Hanno Balitsch =

German retired footballer

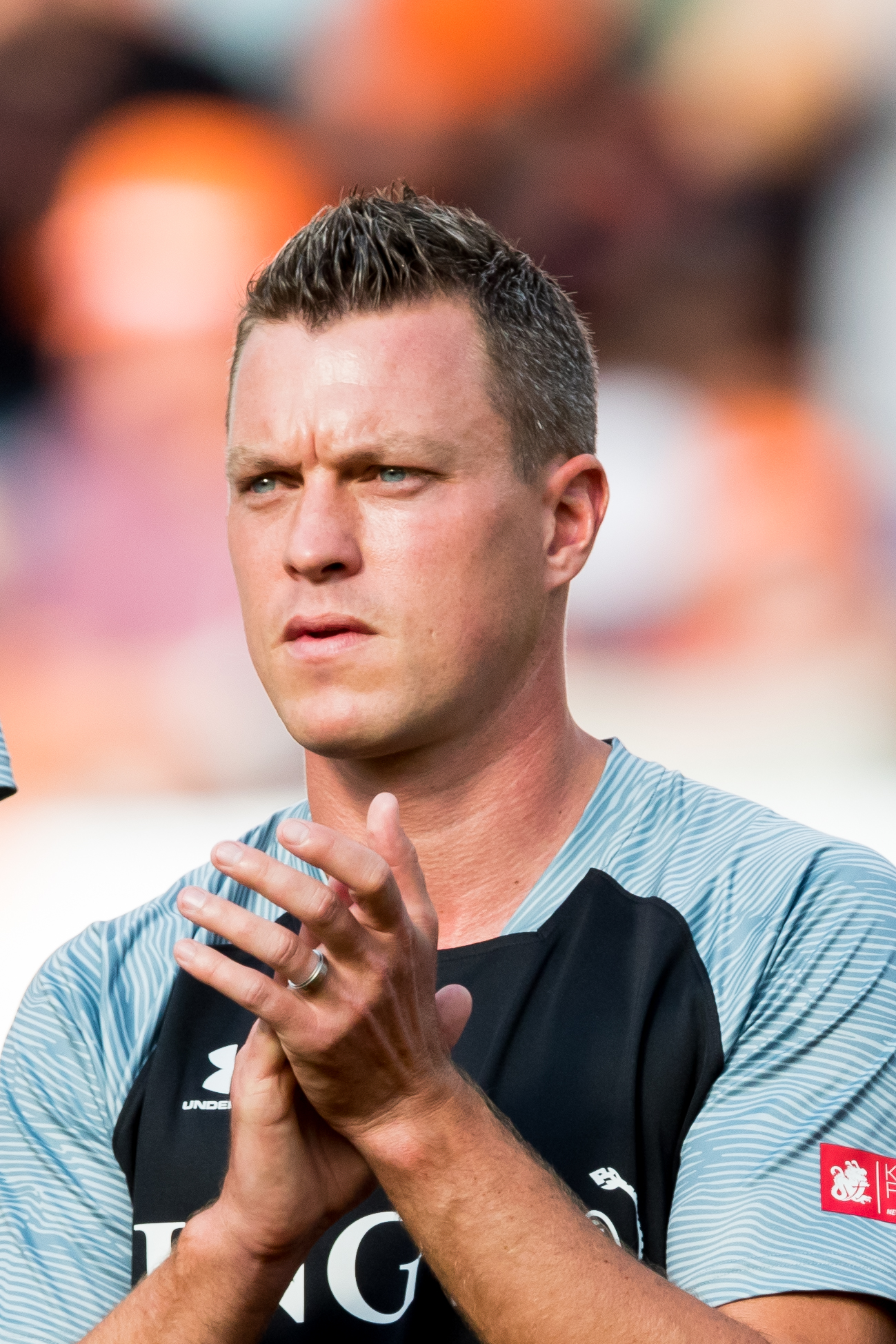
- Balitsch in 2019

Personal information
- Full name: Hanno Balitsch
- Date of birth: 2 January 1981 (age 45)
- Place of birth: Alsbach-Hähnlein, West Germany
- Height: 1.80 m (5 ft 11 in)
- Position: Midfielder

Team information
- Current team: Germany U18 (manager)

Youth career
- 1986–1998: FC Alsbach
- 1998–1999: SV Waldhof Mannheim

Senior career*
Years	Team	Apps	(Gls)
1999–2001	SV Waldhof Mannheim	32	(1)
2001–2002	1. FC Köln	24	(0)
2002–2005	Bayer 04 Leverkusen	64	(3)
2005	1. FSV Mainz 05	14	(0)
2005–2010	Hannover 96	150	(12)
2010–2012	Bayer 04 Leverkusen	32	(3)
2012–2014	1. FC Nürnberg	59	(2)
2013–2014	1. FC Nürnberg II	8	(0)
2014–2015	FSV Frankfurt	28	(1)
2015–2016	SV Waldhof Mannheim	31	(3)
Total		442	(25)

International career
2002–2004	Germany U21	20	(2)
2003	Germany	1	(0)

Managerial career
- 2023–2024: Germany U18
- 2024–2025: Germany U19
- 2025–: Germany U18
- * Club domestic league appearances and goals

Hanno Balitsch (born 2 January 1981) is a German professional football manager and former player who is currently in charge of the Germany national under-18 team.

== Club career ==
Balitsch was born in Alsbach-Hähnlein. In the 1999–2000 season, he transferred from his first team FC Alsbach to SV Waldhof Mannheim. In 2001–02 he moved to 1. FC Köln.

Rapid development with the team and consistent first team performances brought him to Bayer 04 Leverkusen for €2 million. However, he was unable to assert himself within international competition. He saw the opportunity to move to a newly promoted team, FSV Mainz 05, where he moved during the 2004–05 season, and found form amongst the first team. The top league once again beckoned, and the former German Under-21 international moved to Hannover 96.

On 29 May 2010, Balitsch returned to his former club Bayer 04 Leverkusen, signing a two-year deal. He retired from the professional stage after more than 400 first and second level matches in 2016.

== International career ==
He has made one appearance for the Germany national team, coming on as a substitute in a friendly against Spain on 12 February 2003 in Palma de Mallorca.

Sporting positions
Preceded by Robert Enke	Hannover captain 2009–2010	Succeeded by Steve Cherundolo
