= Morten Jensen (footballer) =

German footballer

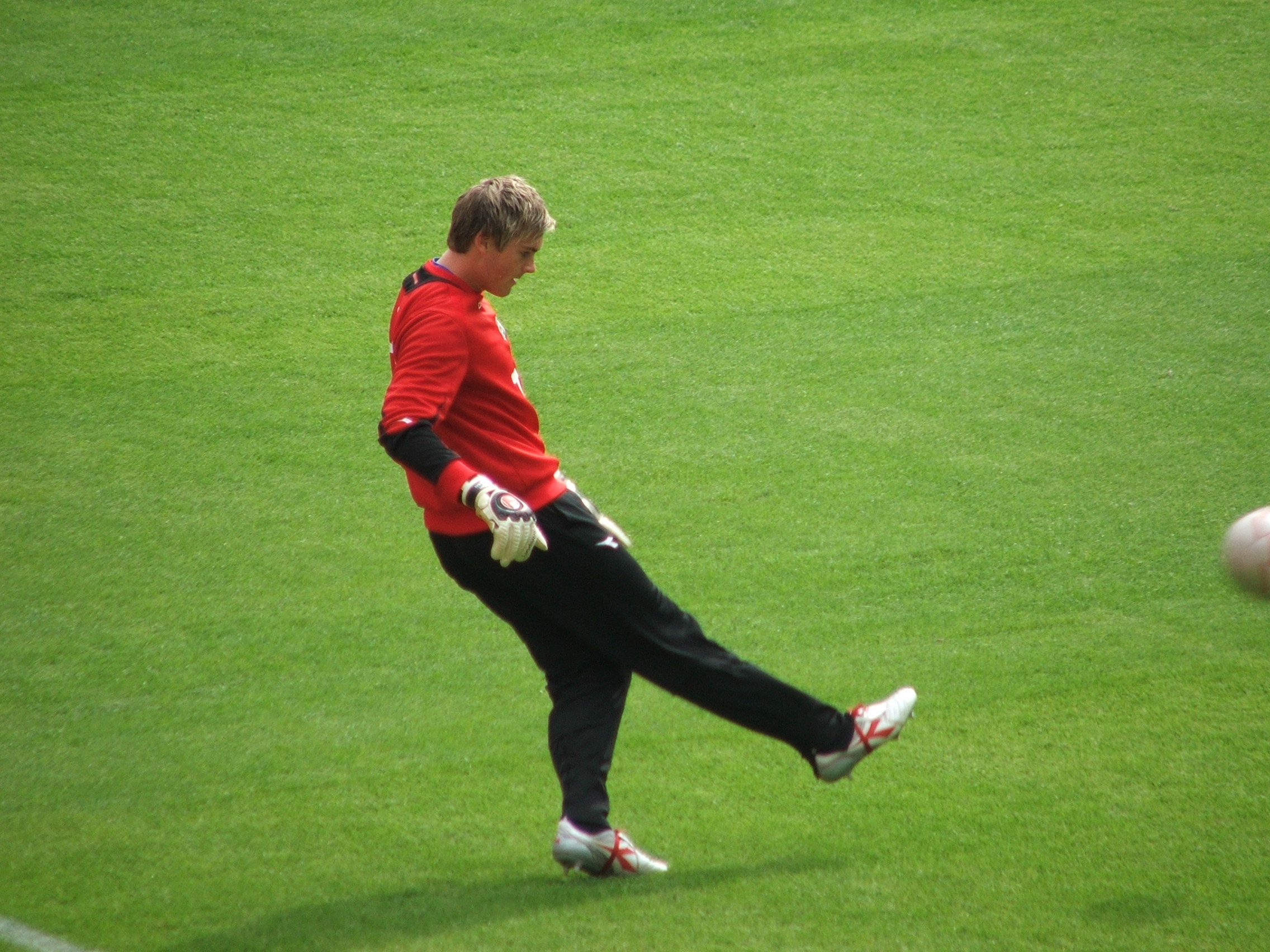
- Jensen warming up for Hannover in 2006.

Personal information
- Date of birth: 20 September 1987 (age 39)
- Place of birth: Husum, West Germany
- Height: 1.88 m (6 ft 2 in)
- Position: Goalkeeper

Team information
- Current team: TSV Havelse

Youth career
- –1995: Rödemisser SV
- 1995–2002: Husumer SV
- 2002–2003: DGF Flensborg

Senior career*
Years	Team	Apps	(Gls)
2003–2010	Hannover 96	2	(0)
2003–2010	Hannover 96 II	126	(0)
2010–2011	Hessen Kassel	28	(0)
2011–2013	Holstein Kiel	46	(0)
2013–2016	SV Elversberg II	3	(0)
2013–2016	SV Elversberg	50	(0)
2016–2018	TSV Havelse	34	(0)
- * Club domestic league appearances and goals as of 15 February 2018

Morten Jensen (born 20 September 1987) is a German former football goalkeeper.

== Career ==
Born in Husum, Jensen joined Hannover 96 in 2003 and established himself as the number one with their amateur side, playing in the Oberliga North. He debuted for the Bundesliga team, when he started in the final day 2–2 draw with Bayer Leverkusen on 13 May 2006. His opportunity arrived after Hannover had loaned out former third choice keeper Daniel Haas to TSG 1899 Hoffenheim. His contract with Hannover 96 expired in the summer of 2010. In July 2010, he signed a contract with Hessen Kassel, before moving to Holstein Kiel a year later.
