= Milan Šašić =

Croatian football manager (born 1958)

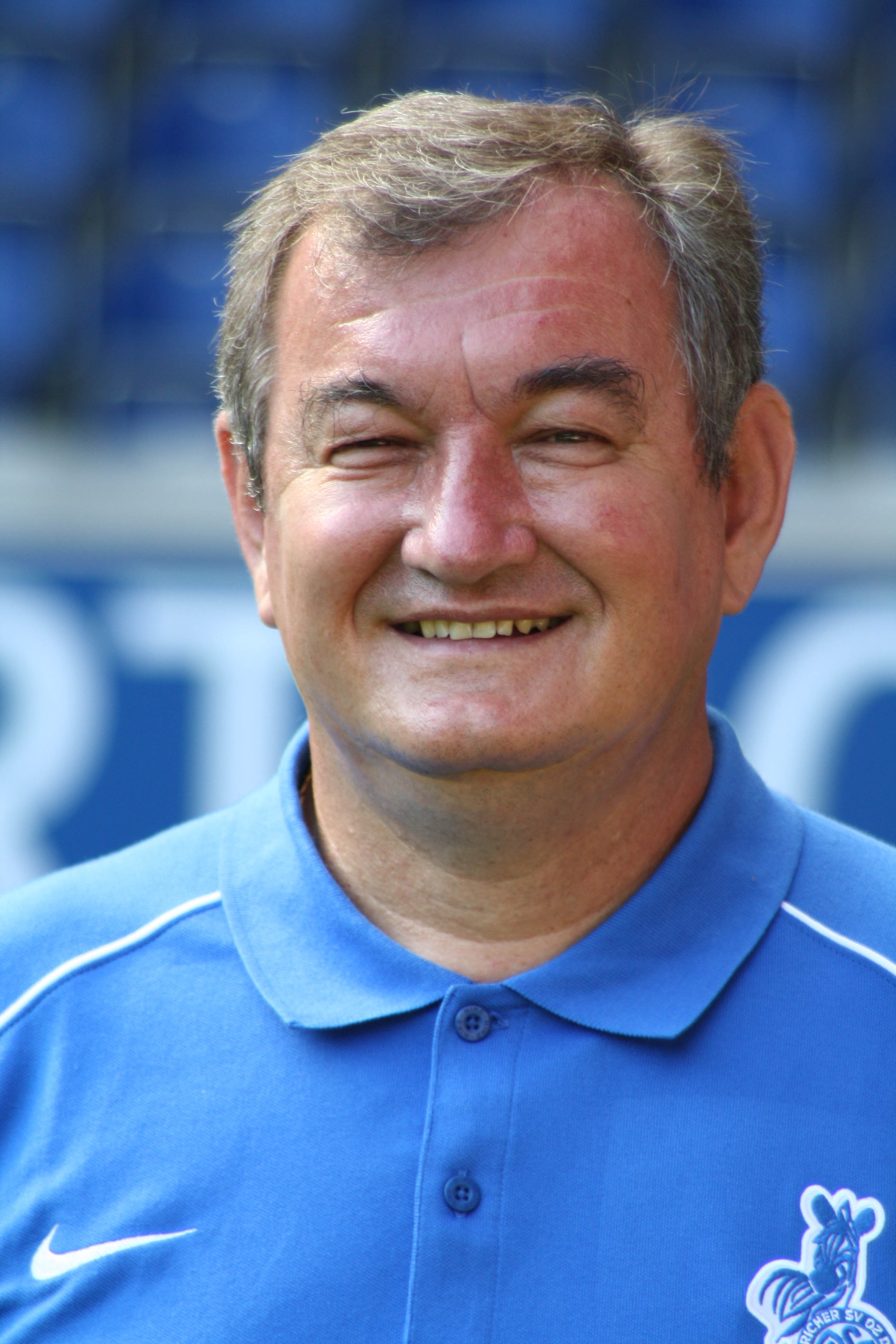
- Šašić with MSV Duisburg

Personal information
- Date of birth: 18 October 1958 (age 68)
- Place of birth: Karlovac, PR Croatia, Yugoslavia
- Position: Goalkeeper

Senior career*
Years	Team	Apps	(Gls)
- NK Karlovac

Managerial career
- 1988–1991: NK Karlovac
- 1994–1995: DJK Gebhardshain-Steinebach
- 1995–2001: VfL Hamm/Sieg
- 2002–2007: TuS Koblenz
- 2008–2009: 1. FC Kaiserslautern
- 2009–2011: MSV Duisburg
- 2013–2014: 1. FC Saarbrücken
- * Club domestic league appearances and goals

Milan Šašić (born 18 October 1958) is a Croatian football manager. Šašić has managed three clubs in the 2. Bundesliga for six seasons.

== Coaching career ==
Šašić managed NK Karlovac from July 1988 to June 1991, DJK Gebhardshain-Steinebach from July 1994 to June 1995, VfL Hamm/Sieg from July 1995 to June 2001, TuS Koblenz from May 2002 to April 2007, 1. FC Kaiserslautern from February 2008 to May 2009, and MSV Duisburg from November 2009 to October 2011. Šašić has managed 1. FC Saarbrücken from September 2013 to February 2014.

== Coaching record ==
As of 10 February 2014

Team	From	To	Record				
Team	From	To	G	W	D	L	Win %
NK Karlovac	1 July 1988	30 June 1991	—				
DJK Gebhardshain-Steinebach	1 July 1994	30 June 1995	—				
VfL Hamm/Sieg	1 July 1995	30 June 2001	—				
TuS Koblenz	1 July 2002	23 April 2007	169	70	52	47	41.42
1. FC Kaiserslautern	12 February 2008	4 May 2009	46	12	16	18	26.09
MSV Duisburg	2 November 2009	28 October 2011	81	34	17	30	41.98
1. FC Saarbrücken	13 September 2013	10 February 2014	17	4	5	8	23.53
Total			313	120	90	103	38.34

== Personal life ==
Šašić is the father-in-law of former female professional footballer Célia Šašić.

== Honours ==
=== Managerial ===
TuS Koblenz

- Oberliga Südwest: 2003-04
- Regionalliga Süd runners-up: 2005-06

MSV Duisburg

- DFB-Pokal runners-up: 2010–11
