= Thomas Gerstner =

German footballer (born 1966)

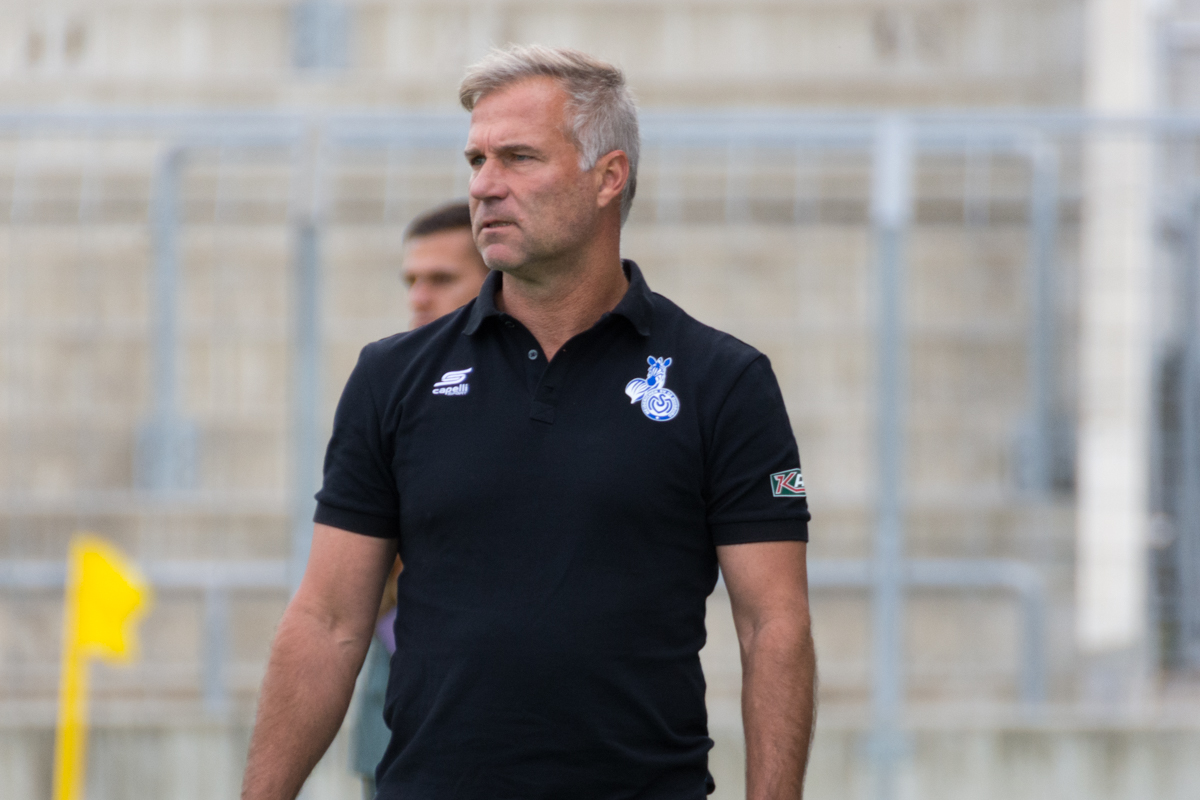
- Gerstner in 2018

Personal information
- Date of birth: 6 November 1966 (age 60)
- Place of birth: Worms, West Germany
- Height: 1.76 m (5 ft 9 in)
- Position: Defender

Team information
- Current team: SV Straelen

Youth career
- 1972–1978: TuS Dorn-Dürkheim
- 1978–1980: Wormatia Worms
- 1980–1984: 1. FC Kaiserslautern
- 1984–1985: Arminia Bielefeld

Senior career*
Years	Team	Apps	(Gls)
1985–1988	Arminia Bielefeld	99	(7)
1988–1990	FC 08 Homburg	54	(5)
1990–1993	VfB Oldenburg	105	(12)
1993–1994	VfL Wolfsburg	30	(5)
1994–1996	1. FC Saarbrücken	5	(0)
1996–1999	Carl Zeiss Jena	67	(5)
1999–2001	Dynamo Dresden	3	(0)
Total		363	(34)

Managerial career
- 1998–1999: Carl Zeiss Jena
- 2002–2003: SV Straelen
- 2006–2007: FC Schönberg
- 2007–2009: Sturm Graz (assistant manager)
- 2009–2010: Arminia Bielefeld
- 2011: Kickers Offenbach
- 2017: North Korea women U20
- 2018–2021: MSV Duisburg (women)
- 2021–: SV Straelen
- * Club domestic league appearances and goals

Thomas Gerstner (born 6 November 1966) is a German football manager and former player. He is the manager of the German club SV Straelen.

== Playing career ==
Gerstner was born in Worms, West Germany. He predominantly played in the 2. Bundesliga. In the 1989–90 season, he played for FC 08 Homburg in the Bundesliga. During this season, he scored his only first division goal on 22 August against FC St. Pauli. The next three years, he played for second division side VfB Oldenburg, who were almost promoted in the 1991–92 season.

== Managerial career ==
Towards the end of his playing career, he was a player-manager for FC Carl Zeiss Jena in the 1998–99 season. After the end of his playing career, he managed SV Straelen from 1 October 2002 to 30 June 2003.

From August 2006 to June 2006, he was with oberliga club FC Schönberg 95. After the end of his contract in Schönberg, he became the new assistant manager of Austrian club SK Sturm Graz. On 24 June 2009, he became the manager of the newly relegated Second Bundesliga team Arminia Bielefeld. His contract ran until 30 June 2010, but on 11 March 2010 Arminia Bielefeld officials dismissed Gerstner. The team was then managed by caretakers Frank Eulberg and Jörg Böhme until the end of the season. On 28 February 2011, Gerstner took over Kickers Offenbach, but he was fired after two months due to lack of success.

In May 2017 he became new manager of the North Korea women's national under-20 football team.

In 2018 he became new manager of the German Frauen-Bundesliga side MSV Duisburg (women). He managed them until June 2021. In November 2021 he returned as manager of his old club SV Straelen.
