= Edmund Becker =

German footballer and manager (born 1956)

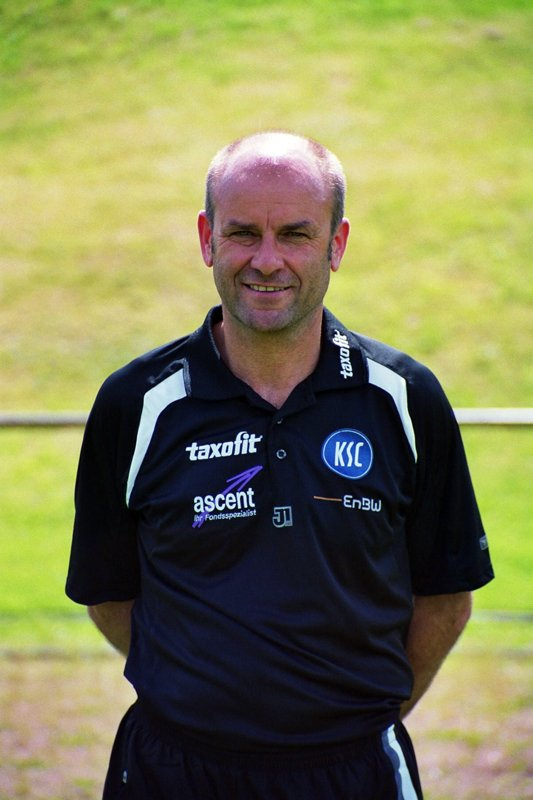
- Becker with Karlsruher SC in October 2007

Personal information
- Full name: Edmund Becker
- Date of birth: 18 July 1956 (age 70)
- Place of birth: Reichenbach, West Germany
- Height: 1.80 m (5 ft 11 in)
- Positions: Midfielder; defender

Senior career*
Years	Team	Apps	(Gls)
1980–1985	Karlsruher SC	94	(9)
1985–1990	TSV Reichenbach		

Managerial career
- 1985–1990: TSV Reichenbach
- 1990–2005: Karlsruher SC II
- 2005–2009: Karlsruher SC
- * Club domestic league appearances and goals

Edmund Becker (born 18 July 1956) is a German former professional footballer who works as manager of the Karlsruher SC youth centre.

== Career ==
Becker was born in Reichenbach.

His biggest success was as a player with Karlsruher SC, when he finished in tenth place in the Bundesliga. During his time with KSC, he played as a midfielder and a defender, playing 94 times between 1980 and 1985, scoring nine goals.

== Coaching career ==
Becker was given the training duties of Karlsruher SC on 13 January 2005. He is generally a quiet, receptive coach who spends much of his time listening to the views of his fans. Becker was fired on 19 August 2009.
