= CFC Hertha 06 =

German football club

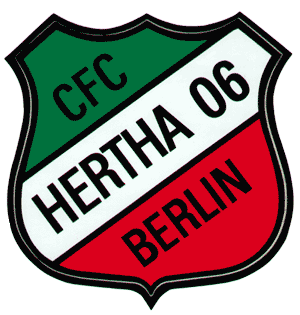
- Full name: Charlottenburger Fußball-Club Hertha 06 e.V.
- Founded: 5 March 1906; 120 years ago
- Dissolved: 2024; 2 years ago
- Ground: Brahestraße
Home colours

CFC Hertha 06 was a German association football club from the Charlottenburg district of Berlin. The club's greatest success was promotion to the tier five NOFV-Oberliga Nord in 2015.

Apart from football the club also offered chess, table tennis and bowling as other sports. The club should not be confused with two other clubs in Berlin bearing Hertha in their name, Hertha BSC and Hertha Zehlendorf.

== History ==
Formed in 1906 as FC Vorwärts Charlottenburg, the team changed its name to CFC Hertha 06 two years later. The club has, for the most part of its history, played in the lower leagues of Berlin football. It achieved brief success in the 1960s when it won promotion to the tier three Amateurliga Berlin and played there for five seasons from 1965 to 1970 before being relegated again. A tenth place in 1965–66 was the club's best result in this era.

The club experienced a revival from the mid-2000s when two consecutive promotions took the team from the tier nine Kreisliga B to the tier seven Bezirksliga by 2005. After three seasons there Hertha won another promotion, now to the Landesliga, where it played for three seasons until relegation in 2011. Back in the Bezirksliga the club quickly recovered, won another promotion and returned to the Landesliga. After two seasons there a championship in 2013–14 took Hertha up to the Berlin-Liga. At this level the club finished runners-up in its first season there. An expansion of the Regionalliga Nordost made an extra promotion spot available for the Berlin-Liga and CFC Hertha 06 moved up alongside league champions Tennis Borussia Berlin to the NOFV-Oberliga Nord for the first time for 2015–16.

On 21 December 2023, CFC Hertha filed an application to open insolvency proceedings at the Charlottenburg District Court, which was rejected due to a lack of assets. The club was subsequently insolvent. It was initially unclear whether the season could be played to the end, but forced relegation to the sixth-tier Berlin-Liga was considered relatively certain. In mid-February 2024, the Berlin Football Association (BFV) announced that Hertha was no longer a member of the association as a result of its dissolution. Because of this, a little later the Northeast German Football Association (NOFV) also excluded Hertha from playing in the Oberliga Nordost, with all 2023–24 season results and records expunged. Earlier, on 4 February, after 117 years of existence, Hertha won its last competitive game against city rivals Sparta Lichtenberg 2–1 at the local Hans Rosenthal sports facility.

== Honours ==
The club's honours:

- Berlin-Liga
  - Runners-up: 2015
- Landesliga Berlin II
  - Champions: 2014
- Bezirksliga Berlin II
  - Runners-up: 2012
- Bezirksliga Berlin III
  - Champions: 2008

== Recent seasons ==
The recent season-by-season performance of the club:

Season	Division	Tier	Position
2003–04	Kreisliga Berlin B	IX	1st ↑
2004–05	Kreisliga Berlin A	VIII	2nd ↑
2005–06	Bezirksliga Berlin III	VII	5th
2006–07	Bezirksliga Berlin II	VII	10th
2007–08	Bezirksliga Berlin III	VII	1st ↑
2008–09	Landesliga Berlin II	VII	6th
2009–10	Landesliga Berlin I	VII	10th
2010–11	Landesliga Berlin II	VII	15th ↓
2011–12	Bezirksliga Berlin II	VIII	2nd ↑
2012–13	Landesliga Berlin I	VII	4th
2013–14	Landesliga Berlin II	VII	1st ↑
2014–15	Berlin-Liga	VI	2nd ↑
2015–16	NOFV-Oberliga Nord	V	9th
2016–17	NOFV-Oberliga Nord	V	12th
2017–18	NOFV-Oberliga Nord	V	13th
2018–19	NOFV-Oberliga Nord	V	11th
2019–20	NOFV-Oberliga Nord	V	14th
2020–21	NOFV-Oberliga Nord	V	14th
2021–22	NOFV-Oberliga Nord	V	3rd
2022–23	NOFV-Oberliga Nord	V	6th
2023–24	NOFV-Oberliga Nord	V	18th

- With the introduction of the Regionalligas in 1994 and the 3. Liga in 2008 as the new third tier, below the 2. Bundesliga, all leagues below dropped one tier.

↑ Promoted	↓ Relegated
