= 2011–12 Hannover 96 season =

Hannover 96
2011–12 season
- Chairman: Martin Kind
- Manager: Mirko Slomka
- Bundesliga: 7th
- DFB-Pokal: Second round
- UEFA Europa League: Quarter-finals
- Top goalscorer: League: Mohammed Abdellaoue (11); All: Mohammed Abdellaoue (16)
- Highest home attendance: 49,000 vs. Multiple Opponents
- Lowest home attendance: 35,400 vs. 1. FC Nürnberg, 28 January 2012
Home colours	Away colours	Third colours

The 2011–12 season of Hannover 96 began on 26 June with their first friendly match.

== Off-season ==
Christian Pander of Schalke 04 became the first official signing of Hannover's 2011–12 season. The next two signings were Polonia Warszawa forward Artur Sobiech and Norwegen Henning Hauger. The remaining signings were Daniel Royer and Samuel Radlinger from SV Ried. Hannover brought Deniz Aycicek and Erdal Akdarı from the youth setup.

After losing his starter's spot, goalkeeper Florian Fromlowitz departed for DFB-Pokal runners-up MSV Duisburg. Constant Djakpa finished his loan and returned to Bayer Leverkusen, while American DaMarcus Beasley left after one season to join Mexican club Puebla after an injury-struck season left him surplus to requirements.

During January, Hannover 96 signed Mame Biram Diouf from Manchester United for a reported £1.5 million on a two-year deal. He made his debut against Hertha BSC as a substitute, then started his first game in a Hannover shirt against Mainz 05.

== Squad ==
Note: Flags indicate national team as defined under FIFA eligibility rules; some limited exceptions apply. Players may hold more than one non-FIFA nationality.

No.	Pos.	Nation	Player
1	GK	GER	Ron-Robert Zieler
2	DF	DEN	Leon Andreasen
3	DF	TUN	Karim Haggui
4	DF	AUT	Emanuel Pogatetz
5	DF	SUI	Mario Eggimann
6	DF	USA	Steve Cherundolo (captain)
7	MF	POR	Sérgio Pinto
8	MF	ALB	Altin Lala
9	FW	POL	Artur Sobiech
11	FW	CIV	Didier Ya Konan
13	FW	GER	Jan Schlaudraff
14	GK	GER	Markus Miller
15	MF	NOR	Henning Hauger
16	MF	AUT	Daniel Royer
17	MF	GER	Moritz Stoppelkamp
18	GK	GER	Pascal Nagel

No.	Pos.	Nation	Player
19	DF	GER	Christian Schulz
20	MF	POR	Carlitos
21	GK	AUT	Samuel Radlinger
23	DF	TUN	Sofian Chahed
24	DF	GER	Christian Pander
25	FW	NOR	Mohammed Abdellaoue
26	MF	GER	Deniz Aycicek
27	DF	TUR	Erdal Akdarı
28	FW	GER	Lars Stindl
30	MF	GER	Tim Wendel
31	MF	GER	Jannis Pläschke
33	MF	GER	Manuel Schmiedebach
34	MF	GER	Konstantin Rausch
35	MF	GER	Christopher Avevor
39	FW	SEN	Mame Biram Diouf

== Friendlies ==
26 June 2011	VfR Osterode (Germany)	1–9	(Germany) Hannover 96	Osterode
16:00 CET	Reinhold 76'		Stindl 10'; Schlaudraff 13', 22', 36', 70'; Schmiedebach 19'; Stoppelkamp 25', 37', 52'	Stadium: Jahnstadion

29 June 2011	SC Uchte (Germany)	0–13	(Germany) Hannover 96	Uchte
19:00 CET			Rausch 15'; Stindl 23'; Akdarı 38'; Schlaudraff 40'; Stoppelkamp 54', 57', 60', 67', 69', 79' unknown 56' (o.g.); Pinto 75'; Aycicek 81'	Stadium: Sandbergstadion

4 July 2011	TSG Emmerthal (Germany)	1–22	(Germany) Hannover 96	Emmerthal
18:00	Mohammed 89'		Schlaudraff 16', 61', 68', 83', 86'; Abdellaoue 17', 72', 84'; Stoppelkamp 23', 34', 36'; Stindl 27', 39', 45'; Aycicek 54', 64', 80', 91'; Chahed 71'; Schmiedebach 76'; Rausch 90'	Stadium: Sportplatz Emmerthal; Attendance: 2,500

6 July 2011	TSV Limmer (Germany)	0–21	(Germany) Hannover 96	Letter
18:00			Pogatetz 2', 12'; Stoppelkamp 17', 25', 31', 55', 62', 66', 70', 79', 80', 81', 83', 84'; Pinto 23', 41', 43'; Aycicek 48', 67', 75'	Stadium: Leinestadion; Attendance: 3096

9 July 2011	Sturm Graz (Austria)	3–3	(Germany) Hannover 96	Gleisdorf
17:30 CET	Szabics 20'; Bukva 50', 88'		Chahed 33'; Stoppelkamp 51'; Aycicek 81'	Attendance: 1,800

14 July 2011	Baník Ostrava (Czech Republic)	0–4	(Germany) Hannover 96	Feldbach
18:30 CET			Rausch 12'; Stoppelkamp 70'; Aycicek 82'; Stindl 88'	Attendance: 400

17 July 2011	Hapoel Tel Aviv (Israel)	2–1	(Germany) Hannover 96	Bad Radkersburg
17:00 CET	unknown 12', 32'		Abdellaoue 16'	Attendance: 400

20 July 2011	Hannover 96 (Germany)	3–1	(England) Sunderland	Hameln
19:00 CET	Abdellaoue 36'; Schlaudraff 38'; Akdarı 84'		Sessègnon 53'	Stadium: Weserberglandstadion; Attendance: 5000

24 July 2011	Hannover 96 (Germany)	0–0	(France) Lyon	Hanover
16:00 CET				Stadium: AWD-Arena; Attendance: 17,200; Referee: Peter Gagelmann (Bremen)

31 August 2011	Egestorf/Langreder (Germany)	0–4	(Germany) Hannover 96
18:00 CET			Aycicek 20'; Stoppelkamp 36'; Pander 30', 49'	Attendance: 2,000

6 October 2011	SC Langenhagen (Germany)	1–4	(Germany) Hannover 96	Langenhagen
17:00 CET	Tunc 74'		Aycicek 60', 69'; Schulz 67'; Rausch 75'	Stadium: Walter-Bettges-Stadion; Attendance: 1,000

8 January 2012	Hannover 96 (Germany)	1–1	(Germany) Köln	Portimão
15:00 CET	Clemens 44'		Schlaudraff 65'	Stadium: Penina Golf Resort; Attendance: 150

14 January 2012	Hannover 96 (Germany)	0–1	(Netherlands) Heerenveen	Vila Nova de Cacela
16:00 CET			Narsingh 7'	Stadium: Training camp Attendance: 200

17 January 2012	Paderborn (Germany)	2–3	(Germany) Hannover 96	Paderborn
18:30 CET	Proschwitz 17' (pen.); Kara 55'		Bertels 27' (o.g.); Royer 53'; Aycicek 90'	Stadium: Energieteam Arena; Attendance: 3328

== Season results ==
=== Bundesliga ===
The 2011–12 Bundesliga campaign began on 6 August when Hannover played in the opening game of the season against Hoffenheim.

==== Matches ====
6 August 2011 1	Hannover 96	2–1	1899 Hoffenheim	Hanover
15:30 CEST (UTC+02:00)	Schlaudraff 15'; Abdellaoue 30' (pen.); Pogatetz (yellow card) 36'; Schulz (yellow card) 42'	Report	Salihović 18' (pen.); Rudy (yellow card) 23'; Obasi (yellow card) 55'	Stadium: AWD-Arena; Attendance: 40,315; Referee: Thorsten Kinhöfer

13 August 2011 2	1. FC Nürnberg	1–2	Hannover 96	Nuremberg
15:30 CEST (UTC+02:00)	Chandler (yellow card) 22'; Schäfer (yellow card) 26'; Pekhart 56'	Report	Abdellaoue 16'; Rausch 27' (pen.); Stindl (yellow card) 29'; Pinto (yellow card) 52'; Zieler (yellow card) 78'	Stadium: EasyCredit-Stadion; Attendance: 40,000; Referee: Marco Fritz

21 August 2011 3	Hannover 96	1–1	Hertha BSC	Hanover
17:30 CEST (UTC+02:00)	Pinto 33', (yellow card) 70'	Report	Mijatović (yellow card) 36'; Ebert (yellow card) 45+2'; Torun (yellow card) 59'; Lasogga 83' (yellow card) 84'; Lell (yellow card) 84'; Franz (yellow card) 90+1'	Stadium: AWD-Arena; Attendance: 41,200; Referee: Robert Hartmann

28 August 2011 4	Hannover 96	1–1	Mainz 05	Hanover
15:30 CEST (UTC+02:00)	Abdellaoue 30'; Schmiedebach (yellow card) 90+2'; Stindl (yellow card) 90+3'	Report	Allagui 2'	Stadium: AWD-Arena; Attendance: 40,420; Referee: Deniz Aytekin

10 September 2011 5	VfB Stuttgart	3–0	Hannover 96	Stuttgart
15:30 CEST (UTC+02:00)	Okazaki 9'; Kuzmanović 79'; Tasci 86'	Report	Haggui (yellow card) 58'	Stadium: Mercedes-Benz Arena; Attendance: 52,000; Referee: Felix Brych

18 September 2011 6	Hannover 96	2–1	Borussia Dortmund	Hanover
15:30 CEST (UTC+02:00)	Pander (yellow card) 84'; Haggui 87'; Ya Konan 89'; Sobiech (red card) 90+1'	Report	Kagawa 63'	Stadium: AWD-Arena; Attendance: 49,000; Referee: Peter Gagelmann

24 September 2011 7	FC Augsburg	0–0	Hannover 96	Augsburg
15:30 CEST (UTC+02:00)	Gogia (yellow card) 78'	Report	Pogatetz (yellow card) 59'; Lala (yellow card) 75'	Stadium: SGL arena Attendance: 29,113; Referee: Christian Dingert

2 October 2011 8	Hannover 96	3–2	Werder Bremen	Hanover
15:30 CEST (UTC+02:00)	Abdellaoue 2' (pen.), 38', 59'; Stindl (yellow card) 44'; Schulz (yellow card) 54'; Pinto (yellow card) 56'; Cherundolo (yellow card) 74'; Schmiedebach (yellow card) 84'	Report	Wolf (yellow card) 30'; Marin (yellow card) 42'; Bargfrede (yellow card) 45'; Arnautović 45+3', (red card) 78'; Pizarro 83'	Stadium: AWD-Arena; Attendance: 49,000; Referee: Guido Winkmann

16 October 2011 9	1. FC Köln	2–0	Hannover 96	Cologne
17:30 CEST (UTC+02:00)	Podolski 24', 86', (yellow card) 65'; Chihi (yellow card) 80'; Lanig (yellow card) 84'	Report	Rausch (yellow card) 33'; Schmiedebach (yellow card) 57'; Pogatetz (yellow card) 62'; Pinto (yellow card) 77'	Stadium: RheinEnergieStadion; Attendance: 46,000; Referee: Jochen Drees

23 October 2011 10	Hannover 96	2–1	Bayern Munich	Hanover
17:30 CEST (UTC+02:00)	Abdellaoue 23' (pen.); Schulz (yellow card) 28'; Cherundolo (yellow card) 33' (yellow-red card) 63'; Pinto (yellow card) 43'; Schmiedebach (yellow card) 49'; Pander 50'; Zieler (yellow card) 58'	Report	Boateng (red card) 28'; Alaba 83'; Ribéry (yellow card) 84'	Stadium: AWD-Arena; Attendance: 49,000; Referee: Manuel Gräfe

29 October 2011 11	Borussia Mönchengladbach	2–1	Hannover 96	Mönchengladbach
15:30 CET (UTC+01:00)	Reus 21', 51'	Report	Schmiedebach (yellow card) 15'; Pogatetz 26'; Ya Konan (yellow card) 88'; Stindl (yellow card)	Stadium: Stadion im Borussia-Park; Attendance: 51,036; Referee: Thorsten Kinhöfer

6 November 2011 12	Hannover 96	2–2	Schalke 04	Hanover
15:30 CET (UTC+01:00)	Papadopoulos 29' (o.g.); Schlaudraff (yellow card) 44'; Abdellaoue 59'; Schulz (yellow card) 83'	Report	Pukki 26', 73'; Matip (yellow card) 32'; Jones (yellow card) 41'; Papadopoulos (yellow card) 53'; Höwedes (yellow card) 87'	Stadium: AWD-Arena; Attendance: 49,000; Referee: Wolfgang Stark

19 November 2011 13	VfL Wolfsburg	4–1	Hannover 96	Wolfsburg
15:30 CET (UTC+01:00)	Salihamidžić 22', 36'; Chris 55'; Mandžukić (yellow card) 67'; Madlung 74'	Report	Schulz 43'; Ya Konan (red card) 58'; Stindl (yellow card) 62'; Chahed (yellow card) 73'	Stadium: Volkswagen Arena; Attendance: 30,000; Referee: Deniz Aytekin

26 November 2011 14	Hannover 96	1–1	Hamburger SV	Hanover
18:30 CET (UTC+01:00)	Haggui (yellow card) 34'; Schlaudraff 79'; Pinto (yellow card) 80'	Report	Bruma 64'; Aogo (yellow card) 78'; Iličević (yellow card) 90'	Stadium: AWD-Arena; Attendance: 49,000; Referee: Felix Zwayer

3 December 2011 15	SC Freiburg	1–1	Hannover 96	Freiburg
15:30 CET (UTC+01:00)	Cissé 67'; Flum (yellow card) 90+3'	Report	Bastians 44' (o.g.); Rausch (yellow card) 60'; Pinto (yellow card) 82'	Stadium: Mage Solar Stadion; Attendance: 30,000; Referee: Jochen Drees

10 December 2011 16	Hannover 96	0–0	Bayer Leverkusen	Hanover
18:30 CET (UTC+01:00)		Report	Schürrle (yellow card) 45+1'; Leno (yellow card) 55'	Stadium: AWD-Arena; Attendance: 44,800; Referee: Peter Gagelmann

18 December 2011 17	1. FC Kaiserslautern	1–1	Hannover 96	Kaiserslautern
15:30 CET (UTC+01:00)	Tiffert (yellow card) 65'; Nemec 68'; Shechter (red card) 87'	Report	Abdellaoue 13', (yellow card) 53'; Rausch (yellow card) 50'	Stadium: Fritz-Walter-Stadion; Attendance: 36,019; Referee: Felix Brych

21 January 2012 18	1899 Hoffenheim	0–0	Hannover 96	Sinsheim
15:30 CET (UTC+01:00)	Beck (yellow card) 59'	Report	Rausch (yellow card) 90'	Stadium: Wirsol Rhein-Neckar-Arena; Attendance: 35,600; Referee: Christian Dingert

27 January 2012 19	Hannover 96	1–0	1. FC Nürnberg	Hanover
20:30 CET (UTC+01:00)	Abdellaoue 18', (yellow card) 65'; Schlaudraff (yellow card) 78'; Pinto (yellow card) 82'	Report	Wollscheid (yellow card) 61'; Eigler (yellow card) 68'	Stadium: AWD-Arena; Attendance: 35,400; Referee: Marco Fritz

4 February 2012 20	Hertha BSC	0–1	Hannover 96	Berlin
15:30 CET (UTC+01:00)	Neumann (yellow card) 26' (yellow-red card) 75'	Report	Cherundolo (yellow card) 56'; Abdellaoue 68'; Sobiech (yellow card) 90'	Stadium: Olympiastadion; Attendance: 36,997; Referee: Peter Sippel

11 February 2012 21	Mainz 05	1–1	Hannover 96	Mainz
15:30 CET (UTC+01:00)	Zidan 7'; Bungert (yellow card) 18'; Szalai (yellow card) 39'; Wetklo (yellow card) 90'	Report	Stindl (yellow card) 17'; Pinto (yellow card) 76'; Sobiech 89'; Schlaudraff (yellow card) 90'	Stadium: Coface Arena; Attendance: 30,173; Referee: Felix Zwayer

19 February 2012 22	Hannover 96	4–2	VfB Stuttgart	Hanover
17:30 CET (UTC+01:00)	Haggui 25'; Diouf 32'; Pander 46'; Stindl 73'	Report	Harnik 75'; Okazaki 79'	Stadium: AWD-Arena; Attendance: 37,800; Referee: Tobias Welz

26 February 2012 23	Borussia Dortmund	3–1	Hannover 96	Dortmund
17:30 CET (UTC+01:00)	Lewandowski 27', 54'; Schmelzer (yellow card) 67'; Kehl (yellow card) 71'; Gündoğan (yellow card) 74'; Perišić 90+2'	Report	Diouf (yellow card) 20'; Schmiedebach (yellow card) 24'; Ya Konan 60', (yellow card) 74'; Stindl (yellow card) 64'	Stadium: Signal Iduna Park; Attendance: 80,720; Referee: Manuel Gräfe

3 March 2012 24	Hannover 96	2–2	FC Augsburg	Hanover
15:30 CET (UTC+01:00)	Haggui 33'; Schulz (yellow card) 34'; Diouf 69'	Report	Bellinghausen 12'; Sankoh (yellow card) 38'; Callsen-Bracker 89' (pen.)	Stadium: AWD-Arena; Attendance: 42,300; Referee: Markus Schmidt

11 March 2012 25	Werder Bremen	3–0	Hannover 96	Bremen
15:30 CET (UTC+01:00)	Pizarro 31'; Prödl 49'; Rosenberg 56'	Report	Sobiech (yellow card) 67'; Royer (yellow card) 72'; Stindl (yellow card) 72'; Lala (yellow card) 90+1'	Stadium: Weserstadion; Attendance: 41,500; Referee: Christian Dingert

18 March 2012 26	Hannover 96	4–1	1. FC Köln	Hanover
17:30 CET (UTC+01:00)	Stindl 19'; Schlaudraff 61' (pen.); Diouf 67', 83'	Report	Pezzoni 43'; Sereno (yellow card) 61'	Stadium: AWD-Arena; Attendance: 45,000; Referee: Wolfgang Stark

24 March 2012 27	Bayern Munich	2–1	Hannover 96	Munich
15:30 CET (UTC+01:00)	Pranjić (yellow card) 7'; Kroos 36'; Gómez 68'	Report	Cherundolo (yellow card) 10'; Ya Konan 74', (yellow card) 89'	Stadium: Allianz Arena; Attendance: 43,300; Referee: Guido Winkmann

1 April 2012 28	Hannover 96	2–1	Borussia Mönchengladbach	Hanover
15:30 CEST (UTC+02:00)	Ya Konan 57'; Diouf 76'	Report	Dante (yellow card) 63'; Nordtveit 78'	Stadium: AWD-Arena; Attendance: 49,000; Referee: Felix Brych

8 April 2012 29	Schalke 04	3–0	Hannover 96	Gelsenkirchen
15:30 CEST (UTC+02:00)	Raúl 6', 47'; Huntelaar 63'	Report	Haggui (yellow card) 58'	Stadium: Veltins-Arena; Attendance: 61,673; Referee: Tobias Stieler

11 April 2012 30	Hannover 96	2–0	VfL Wolfsburg	Hanover
20:00 CEST (UTC+02:00)	Diouf 44'; Ya Konan 77'	Report	Lopes (yellow card) 63'	Stadium: AWD-Arena; Attendance: 43,800; Referee: Peter Sippel

14 April 2012 31	Hamburger SV	1–0	Hannover 96	Hamburg
15:30 CEST (UTC+02:00)	Son 12'; Jarolím (yellow card) 52'; Sala (yellow card) 89'	Report	Haggui (yellow card) 74'; Pinto (yellow card) 82'	Stadium: Imtech Arena; Attendance: 57,000; Referee: Günter Perl

22 April 2012 32	Hannover 96	0–0	SC Freiburg	Hanover
17:30 CEST (UTC+02:00)	Rausch (yellow card) 86'	Report	Freis (yellow card) 68'	Stadium: AWD-Arena; Attendance: 48,000; Referee: Guido Winkmann

28 April 2012 33	Bayer Leverkusen	1–0	Hannover 96	Leverkusen
15:30 CEST (UTC+02:00)	Reinartz (yellow card) 33'; Kießling 75'	Report		Stadium: BayArena; Attendance: 30,210; Referee: Tobias Welz

5 May 2012 34	Hannover 96	2–1	1. FC Kaiserslautern	Hanover
15:30 CEST (UTC+02:00)	Bugera 38' (o.g.); Pinto (yellow card) 60'; Schulz (yellow card) 61'; Ya Konan 71'	Report	De Wit 7'; Dick (yellow card) 33'	Stadium: AWD-Arena; Attendance: 49,000; Referee: Felix Brych

==== League table ====
Pos	Team	Pld	W	D	L	GF	GA	GD	Pts	Qualification or relegation
5	Bayer Leverkusen	34	15	9	10	52	44	+8	54	Qualification to Europa League group stage (Note: The 2011–12 DFB-Pokal champions (Borussia Dortmund) and runners-up (Bayern Munich) qualified for the 2012–13 UEFA Champions League, thus the three Europa League places were distributed through league positions.)
6	VfB Stuttgart	34	15	8	11	63	46	+17	53	Qualification to Europa League play-off round
7	Hannover 96	34	12	12	10	41	45	−4	48	Qualification to Europa League third qualifying round
8	VfL Wolfsburg	34	13	5	16	47	60	−13	44	
9	Werder Bremen	34	11	9	14	49	58	−9	42	

Source: kicker
Rules for classification: 1) points; 2) goal difference; 3) number of goals scored.

=== DFB-Pokal ===
Hannover kicked off the 2011–12 DFB-Pokal against FC Anker Wismar in Lübeck, where they advanced to the second round with a 6–0 victory.

31 August 2011 1st Round	Anker Wismar	0–6	Hannover 96	Lübeck
14:30	Heine (yellow card) 43'	(in German)	Abdellaoue 13', 25'; Stindl 34', 36'; Rausch (yellow card) 43'; Stoppelkamp 71', 76'	Stadium: Lohmühle Stadion; Attendance: 6,077; Referee: Peter Sippel

26 October 2011 2nd Round	Hannover 96	0–1 (a.e.t.)	Mainz 05	Hanover
19:00 CET	Cherundolo (yellow card) 93'; Pinto (yellow card) 115'	Report	Soto (yellow card) 56'; Ivanschitz 93', (yellow card) 104'	Stadium: AWD-Arena; Attendance: 30,100; Referee: Felix Brych

=== Europa League ===
Hannover 96 qualified for the play-off round of the 2011–12 UEFA Europa League by finishing fourth in the Bundesliga in 2010–11.

==== Play-off Round ====
18 August 2011 Play-off	Hannover 96 (Germany)	2–1	(Spain) Sevilla	Hannover, Germany
20:30 CET	Schlaudraff 6', 45'; Schulz (yellow card) 64'; Stindl (yellow card) 87'		Kanouté 37'; Navarro (yellow card) 54'; Fazio (yellow card) 72'	Stadium: AWD-Arena; Attendance: 43,500; Referee: Bas Nijhuis

25 August 2011 Play-off	Sevilla (Spain)	1–1 (2–3 agg.)	(Germany) Hannover 96	Seville, Spain
21:05 CET	Alexis (yellow card) 7'; Perotti (yellow card) 21'; Pogatetz 37' (o.g.); Kanouté (yellow card) 50'; Medel (yellow card) 65' (red card) 90'; Manu (yellow card) 76'		Abdellaoue 23'; Stindl (yellow card) 44'; Cherundolo (yellow card) 49'; Schulz (yellow card) 55'; Schlaudraff (yellow card) 56'; Schmiedebach (yellow card) 74'	Stadium: Ramón Sánchez Pizjuán Stadium; Attendance: 42,000; Referee: Serge Gumienny

After beating Sevilla 3–2 on aggregate in the play-offs, Hannover 96 advanced to Group B of the 2011–12 UEFA Europa League.

==== Group stage ====
Pos	Team	Pld	W	D	L	GF	GA	GD	Pts	Qualification
1	(Belgium) Standard Liège	6	4	2	0	9	1	+8	14	Advance to knockout phase
2	(Germany) Hannover 96	6	3	2	1	9	7	+2	11	Advance to knockout phase
3	(Denmark) Copenhagen	6	1	2	3	5	9	−4	5	
4	(Ukraine) Vorskla Poltava	6	0	2	4	4	10	−6	2	

Source: Soccerway

15 September 2011	Hannover 96 (Germany)	0–0	(Belgium) Standard Liège	AWD-Arena, Hannover
19:00	Stindl (yellow card) 90+1'		Vainqueur (yellow card) 8'; Van Damme (yellow card) 23'; Felipe (yellow card) 57'	Attendance: 42,350; Referee: Aleksander Stavrev (Macedonia)

29 September 2011	Vorskla Poltava (Ukraine)	1–2	(Germany) Hannover 96	Butovsky Vorskla Stadium, Poltava
21:05	Krasnopyorov (yellow card) 38'; Kurylov 50'; Bezus (yellow card) 86'		Lala (yellow card) 20'; Abdellaoue 32'; Pander 44'; Schlaudraff (yellow card) 46'; Cherundolo (yellow card) 60'; Pinto (yellow card) 83'	Attendance: 11,000; Referee: Kristinn Jakobsson (Iceland)

20 October 2011	Hannover 96 (Germany)	2–2	(Denmark) Copenhagen	AWD-Arena, Hannover
21:05	Pander 29'; Pinto 82'		N'Doye 68'; Grindheim (yellow card) 72'; Delaney (yellow card) 81'; Santin 89'	Attendance: 43,100; Referee: Laurent Duhamel (France)

3 November 2011	Copenhagen (Denmark)	1–2	(Germany) Hannover 96	Parken Stadium, Copenhagen
19:00	Oviedo (yellow card) 58'; N'Doye 67'		Pogatetz (yellow card) 45'; Schlaudraff 71'; Stindl 74'; Haggui (yellow card) 90+3'	Referee: Eric Bramhaar (Netherlands)

30 November 2011	Standard Liège (Belgium)	2–0	(Germany) Hannover 96	Stade Maurice Dufrasne, Liège
21:05	Tchité 26'; Cyriac 59'	Report	Schlaudraff (yellow card) 6'; Cherundolo (yellow card) 11'	Attendance: 18,104; Referee: Antonio Damato (Italy)

15 December 2011	Hannover 96 (Germany)	3–1	(Ukraine) Vorskla Poltava	AWD-Arena, Hanover
19:00	Rausch 25'; Ya Konan 33'; Sobiech (yellow card) 33', (goal) 78'	Report	Bezus 45+1' (pen.), (yellow card) 87'; Januzi (yellow card) 56'	Attendance: 42,000; Referee: Leontios Trattou (Cyprus)

==== Knockout phase ====
16 February 2012 RO32 1st Leg	Hannover 96 (Germany)	2–1	(Belgium) Club Brugge	AWD-Arena, Hanover
21:05 CET	Eggimann (yellow card) 18'; Stindl (yellow card) 61'; Cherundolo (yellow card) 72'; Sobiech 73', (yellow card) 86'; Schlaudraff 80' (pen.)	Report	Vázquez (yellow card) 40'; Kujović (yellow card) 49'; Lestienne 51'; Stenman (yellow card) 59'; Donk (yellow card) 80'; Van Acker (yellow card) 86'	Attendance: 42,000; Referee: Jorge Sousa, Portugal

23 February 2012 RO32 2nd Leg	Club Brugge (Belgium)	0–1 (1–3 agg.)	(Germany) Hannover 96	Jan Breydel Stadium, Bruges
19:00 CET	Zimling (yellow card) 10'; Refaelov (yellow card) 76'; Meunier (yellow card) 84'; Akpala (yellow card) 86'; Vleminckx (yellow card) 86'	Report	Diouf 21'; Zieler (yellow card) 37'; Chahed (yellow card) 52'; Schlaudraff (yellow card) 63'	Attendance: 22,000; Referee: William Collum (Scotland)

After winning 3–1 on aggregate, Hannover 96 advance to the round of 16 to play Standard Liège.

8 March 2012 RO16 1st Leg	Standard Liège (Belgium)	2–2	(Germany) Hannover 96	Stade Maurice Dufrasne, Liège
21:05	Buyens 27', (yellow card) 86'; Tchité 30'; Ciman (yellow card) 61'	Report	Stindl 22' (pen.); Diouf 56'; Sobiech (yellow card) 67'; Cherundolo (yellow card) 81'	Attendance: 25,000; Referee: Tony Chapron (France)

15 March 2012 RO16 2nd Leg	Hannover 96 (Germany)	4–0 (6–2 agg.)	(Belgium) Standard Liège	AWD-Arena, Hanover
19:00	Abdellaoue 4'; Kanu 21', 73' (o.g.); Haggui (yellow card) 45'; Schulz (yellow card) 69'; Pinto 90+3'	Report	Gakpé (yellow card) 18' (yellow-red card) 58'; Opare (yellow card) 26'; Van Damme (yellow card) 61'	Attendance: 42,000; Referee: Pavel Královec (Czech Republic)

After winning 6–2 on aggregate, Hannover 96 advance to the quarterfinals to play Atlético Madrid.

29 March 2012 Quarterfinals 1st Leg	Atlético Madrid (Spain)	2–1	(Germany) Hannover 96	Vicente Calderón Stadium, Madrid
21:05	Falcao 9'; Juanfran (yellow card) 15'; Gabi (yellow card) 58'; Godín (yellow card) 73'; Diego (yellow card) 78'; Salvio 89'; Turan (yellow card) 90+1'	Report	Diouf 38'; Pinto (yellow card) 43'; Schlaudraff (yellow card) 90+1'	Attendance: 35,000; Referee: Stéphane Lannoy (France)

5 April 2012 Quarterfinals 2nd Leg	Hannover 96 (Germany)	1–2 (2–4 agg.)	(Spain) Atlético Madrid	AWD-Arena, Hanover
21:05	Pinto (yellow card) 49'; Diouf 81'	Report	Falcao (yellow card) 16', (goal) 87'; Diego (yellow card) 43'; Godín (yellow card) 50'; Koke (yellow card) 54'; Adrián 63'; Miranda (yellow card) 68'	Attendance: 44,000; Referee: Mark Clattenburg (England)

Hannover 96 lose 2–4 on aggregate.

== Goalscorers ==
All competitions

Scorer	Goals
(Norway) Mohammed Abdellaoue	16
(Senegal) Mame Biram Diouf	11
(Ivory Coast) Didier Ya Konan	6
(Germany) Jan Schlaudraff	6
(Germany) Lars Stindl	5
(Germany) Moritz Stoppelkamp	4
(Germany) Christian Pander	3
(Portugal) Sérgio Pinto	3
(Poland) Artur Sobiech	2
(Tunisia) Karim Haggui	1
(Germany) Konstantin Rausch	1
(Austria) Emanuel Pogatetz	1

Bundesliga

Scorer	Goals
(Norway) Mohammed Abdellaoue	11
(Senegal) Mame Biram Diouf	8
(Ivory Coast) Didier Ya Konan	6
(Germany) Jan Schlaudraff	3
(Germany) Christian Pander	2
(Portugal) Sérgio Pinto	1
(Germany) Konstantin Rausch	1
(Tunisia) Karim Haggui	1
(Austria) Emanuel Pogatetz	1
(Poland) Artur Sobiech	1
(Germany) Lars Stindl	1

UEFA Europa League

Scorer	Goals
(Senegal) Mame Biram Diouf	3
(Germany) Jan Schlaudraff	3
(Norway) Mohammed Abdellaoue	3
(Germany) Moritz Stoppelkamp	2
(Portugal) Sérgio Pinto	2
(Germany) Lars Stindl	2
(Germany) Christian Pander	1
(Poland) Artur Sobiech	1

DFB-Pokal

Scorer	Goals
(Norway) Mohammed Abdellaoue	2
(Germany) Moritz Stoppelkamp	2
(Germany) Lars Stindl	2

Last updated: 7 May 2012

== Reserve team ==
Hannover's reserve team play in the fourth tier Regionalliga Nord and are coached by Jürgen Willmann.

=== Squad ===
Note: Flags indicate national team as defined under FIFA eligibility rules; some limited exceptions apply. Players may hold more than one non-FIFA nationality.

No.	Pos.	Nation	Player
—	GK	GER	Marcel Klonz
—	GK	GER	Pascal Nagel
—	DF	TUR	Erdal Akdarı
—	DF	GER	Christopher Avevor
—	DF	GER	Christian Brinkmann
—	DF	GER	Niko Gießelmann
—	DF	GER	Jannik Löhden
—	DF	ETH	Khaled Mesfin-Mulugeta
—	DF	GER	Jannis Pläschke
—	DF	GER	Florian Rutter
—	DF	GER	Tim Wendel
—	MF	GER	Deniz Aycicek
—	MF	GER	Lars Fuchs
—	MF	TUR	Engin Kiy

No.	Pos.	Nation	Player
—	MF	GER	Patrick Jöcks
—	MF	GER	Marc-Kemo Kranich
—	MF	GER	Tom Merkens
—	MF	KOS	Bajram Mustafa-Muzaqi
—	MF	JPN	Masahito Noto
—	MF	GER	Sascha Schünemann
—	FW	CMR	Conrad Azong
—	FW	GER	Florian Beil
—	FW	GER	Florian Büchler
—	FW	TUR	Ali Gökdemir
—	FW	SEN	Saliou Sane
—	FW	ITA	Giacomo Serrone
—	FW	LBN	Feiz Chamsine
