= Víctor Vázquez =

Víctor Vázquez may refer to:

- Víctor Vázquez (artist), Puerto Rican photographer and conceptual artist
- Víctor Vázquez (footballer, born 1989), Spanish football striker
- Víctor Vázquez (footballer, born 1987), Spanish football attacking midfielder

== See also ==
- Kool A.D., also known as Victor Vazquez (without diacritics)
- Victor Vásquez
