= Ron-Robert Zieler =

German footballer (born 1989)

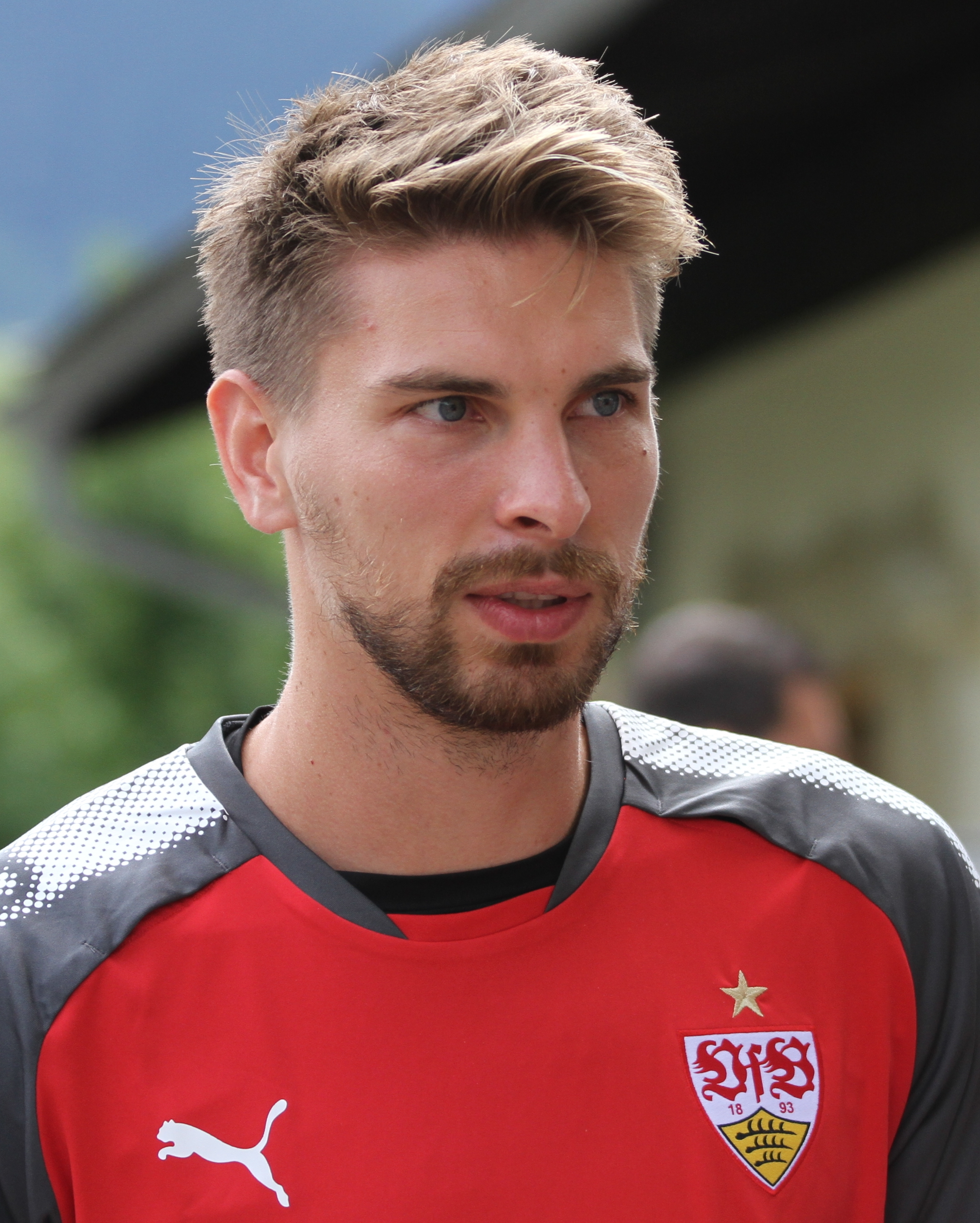
- Zieler with VfB Stuttgart in 2017

Personal information
- Full name: Ron-Robert Zieler
- Date of birth: 12 February 1989 (age 37)
- Place of birth: Cologne, West Germany
- Height: 1.88 m (6 ft 2 in)
- Position: Goalkeeper

Team information
- Current team: 1. FC Köln
- Number: 20

Youth career
- 1994–1999: SCB Viktoria Köln
- 1999–2005: 1. FC Köln
- 2005–2008: Manchester United

Senior career*
| Years | Team | Apps | (Gls) |
| 2008–2010 | Manchester United | 0 | (0) |
| 2008–2009 | → Northampton Town (loan) | 2 | (0) |
| 2010–2011 | Hannover 96 II | 15 | (0) |
| 2010–2016 | Hannover 96 | 185 | (0) |
| 2016–2017 | Leicester City | 9 | (0) |
| 2017–2019 | VfB Stuttgart | 68 | (0) |
| 2019–2025 | Hannover 96 | 158 | (0) |
| 2020–2021 | → 1. FC Köln (loan) | 1 | (0) |
| 2025– | 1. FC Köln | 0 | (0) |

International career
| 2004–2005 | Germany U16 | 5 | (0) |
| 2005–2006 | Germany U17 | 11 | (0) |
| 2007 | Germany U18 | 1 | (0) |
| 2008 | Germany U19 | 10 | (0) |
| 2009 | Germany U20 | 5 | (0) |
| 2011–2015 | Germany | 6 | (0) |
Medal record
Men's football
Representing Germany
FIFA World Cup
| Winner | 2014 Brazil |
UEFA European Under-19 Championship
| Winner | 2008 Czech Republic |
- * Club domestic league appearances and goals as of 7 July 2025

Ron-Robert Zieler (born 12 February 1989) is a German professional footballer who plays as a goalkeeper for Bundesliga club 1. FC Köln. Between 2011 and 2015, he made six appearances for the Germany national team.

He began his professional career at Manchester United, where he did not play a competitive match, making his debut on loan at Northampton Town. In 2010, he moved to Hannover 96, where he made 221 professional appearances across six seasons; he did not miss a Bundesliga game in any of his five final seasons. Zieler joined VfB Stuttgart in 2017 after one season with Leicester City before returning to Hannover in 2019.

A former German youth international, Zieler won the 2008 UEFA European Under-19 Championship. He made his senior international debut in 2011, and was part of Germany's squads which reached the semi-finals of UEFA Euro 2012 and won the 2014 FIFA World Cup.

== Club career ==
=== Early career ===
Zieler was born in Cologne, North Rhine-Westphalia. He began his football career with his hometown club SCB Viktoria Köln before joining 1. FC Köln in 2001. In July 2005, he moved to England as a trainee with Manchester United. By the time he moved to Manchester United, Zieler finished his education in Germany.

=== Manchester United ===
In his first season with Manchester United, Zieler played 22 times for the Under-18 side, including four in the FA Youth Cup. He was also named as an unused substitute in 11 reserve matches, including the final of the Manchester Senior Cup, earning him a winners medal. The following season, he shared Under-18 goalkeeping duties with Ben Amos, but also made his debut for the reserves on 15 March 2007, a 3–0 home defeat to Sheffield United. Despite that inauspicious start, he made amends four days later by keeping a clean sheet in the 2–0 Manchester Senior Cup win over Oldham Athletic.

The 2007–08 season marked Zieler's emergence as a full member of the reserve team, as he and Tom Heaton shared the majority of the goalkeeping duties, each making 11 appearances. In May 2008, Zieler won another Manchester Senior Cup winners medal, as he played the full 90 minutes and kept a clean sheet against Bolton Wanderers. He then played in the final of the Lancashire Senior Cup at the end of July 2008, restricting Liverpool to just two goals as United won 3–2.

At the start of the 2008–09 season, Zieler was given a first team squad number – 38 – for the first time. He got his first taste of first team action on 23 September 2008, when he was named on the bench for United's 3–1 League Cup win over Middlesbrough.

==== Northampton Town (loan) ====
On 28 November 2008, Zieler was sent on loan to Northampton Town until 31 December as cover for their one senior goalkeeper, Chris Dunn, as Frank Fielding's loan from Blackburn Rovers was coming to an end. The loan was subsequently extended until 31 January 2009, and then extended again on 2 February until 25 February.

Zieler made his debut for Northampton Town on 21 February 2009, playing for the full 90 minutes of the Cobblers' 2–0 home defeat by Walsall. He then played again three days later, in a 1–1 draw away to Brighton & Hove Albion, before returning to Manchester United on 26 February after his loan spell reached 93 days. The loan could not be extended as 93 days is the maximum loan spell allowed outside the transfer window.

==== Back to Manchester United ====
Upon returning to Manchester United, Zieler recommenced his duties as reserve team goalkeeper, conceding just one goal in his first four games back. However, in a match against Newcastle United Reserves on 30 March 2009, he suffered a broken arm after colliding with a Newcastle striker in mid-air. He returned to action in the 2009–10 pre-season, but struggled to regain his position in the reserve team; his appearances throughout the season were sporadic and he was most often named as an unused substitute.

=== Hannover 96 ===
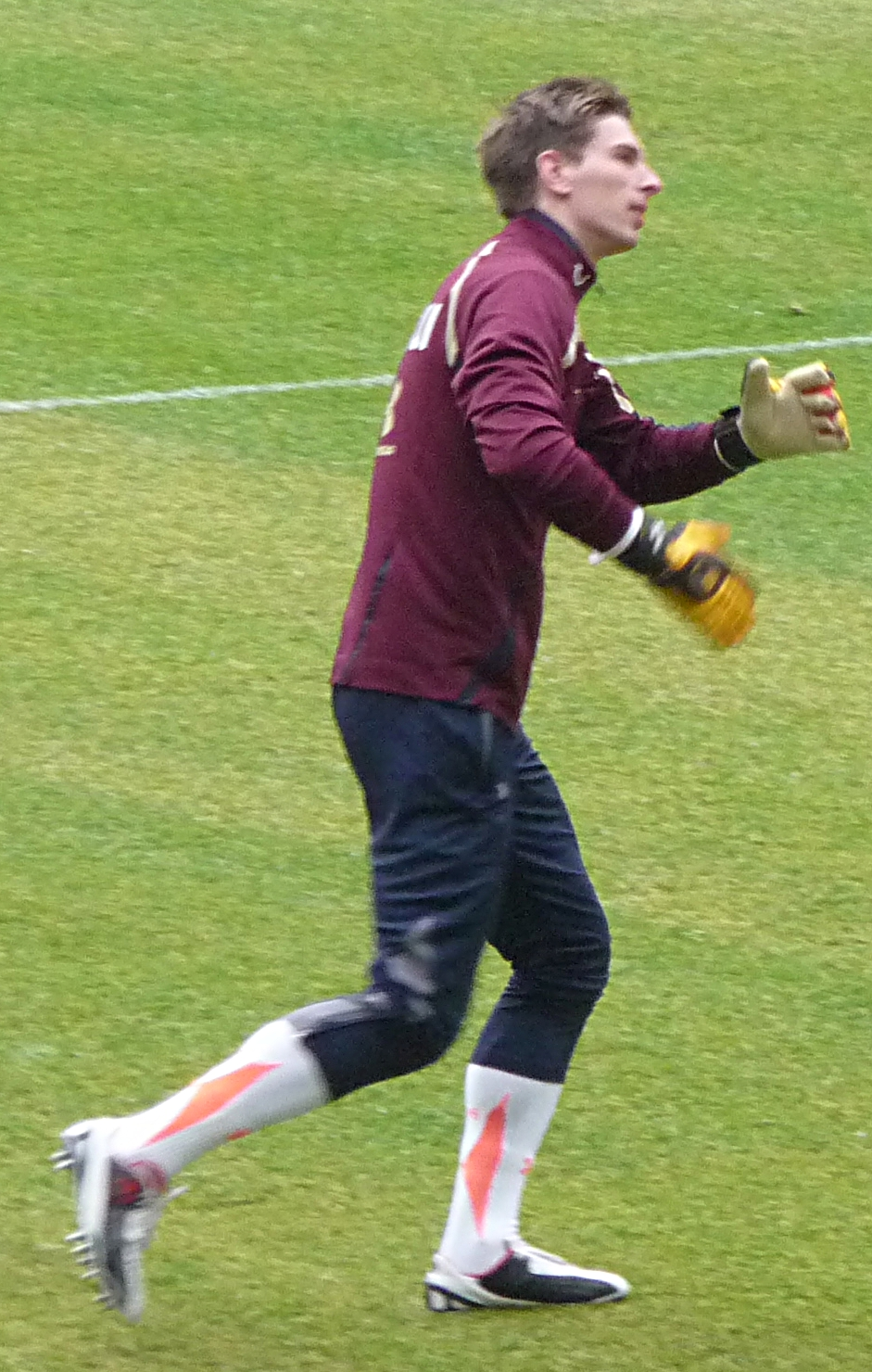
Zieler training at Hannover 96

On 22 April 2010, following a trial period, Zieler signed a two-year contract with German side Hannover 96. The contract began on 1 July 2010 and also included the option for a one-year extension. Upon joining the club, Zieler was given a number 20 shirt.

His consistent performances for Hannover 96 II earned him a promotion to the first team, appearing on the substitute bench against Borussia Mönchengladbach on 4 December 2010 and made his Bundesliga debut on 16 January 2011 away at Eintracht Frankfurt; he kept a clean sheet as his team won 3–0. Since his debut, he was made the first-choice goalkeeper for the rest of the season, dropping Florian Fromlowitz to the bench. However, Zieler suffered a shoulder injury and was substituted as a result after playing 52 minutes, which saw Hannover 96 lose 4–0 against his former club, 1. FC Köln, on 11 March 2011. After returning to training, Zieler returned to the first team, in a 1–1 draw against Mainz on 9 April 2011. Zieler went on to make fifteen appearances for the club in his first season.

Ahead of the 2011–12 season, it was announced on 24 June 2011 that Zieler signed a contract extension, keeping him until June 2015. It came after Zieler was linked with a move to Schalke 04 as a replacement for Manuel Neuer, who joined Bayern Munich. He also switched to the number 1 shirt previously worn by Fromlowitz, who transferred to MSV Duisburg. The 2011–12 season saw Zieler make his first Europa League appearance in the Qualification Round against Sevilla, which saw them win 3–1 in the first leg. In the return leg, Zieler conceded one goal, but helped the club draw 1–1 and helped them go through to the Group stage. Zieler remained the club's first choice goalkeeper for the 2011–12 season, both in the league and in the cup competitions, playing 4410 minutes in all competitions.

In the 2012–13 season, Zieler started the season well when he saved two penalties in the second round of DFB-Pokal in the penalty shootout against Dynamo Dresden; Hannover won 5–4 after playing 120 minutes and went through to the next round. In both encounters against Bayern Munich in the league, Zieler conceded eleven goals against the club, as Hannover lost 5–0 and 6–1 on 24 November 2012 and 20 April 2013 respectively. Despite this, Zieler continued to remain the first choice goalkeeper for the 2012–13 season, both in the league and in the cup competitions, playing 4440 minutes in all competitions.

Ahead of the 2013–14 season, Zieler was linked with a return move to England, with Liverpool keen on signing him, but was ruled out of a move, due to Hannover keen on continuing developing Zieler. Zieler remained at the club throughout the season and started well when he kept a clean sheet in the opening game of the season, with a 2–0 win over Wolfsburg. Zieler then made his 100th league appearance for the club on 21 December 2013 against Freiburg, but was booked in the 88th minute after fouling Admir Mehmedi, resulting in him being substituted and Hannover losing 2–1. Despite this, Zieler continued to remain the first choice goalkeeper for the 2013–14 season, both in the league and in the cup competitions, playing 3240 minutes in all competitions.

Ahead of the 2014–15 season, the club was keen on extending Zieler's contract, with his contract expected to expire at the end of the season. However, the talks over a new contract for Zieler were set to start after the conclusion of the World Cup. On 9 August 2014, Zieler signed a contract with the club, keeping him until 2017. Zieler made his 120th appearance, breaking Horst Podlasly's record of 120 consecutive appearances, in a 4–3 loss against Hoffenheim on 29 November 2014. After conceding fourteen goals in four games between 22 November 2014 and 13 December 2014, Zieler ended the drought when he finally kept a clean sheet on 16 December 2014, in a 2–0 win over Augsburg, ending a four match losing streak. Zieler went on to remain the first choice goalkeeper for the 2014–15 season, both in the league and in the cup competitions, playing 3240 minutes in all competitions.

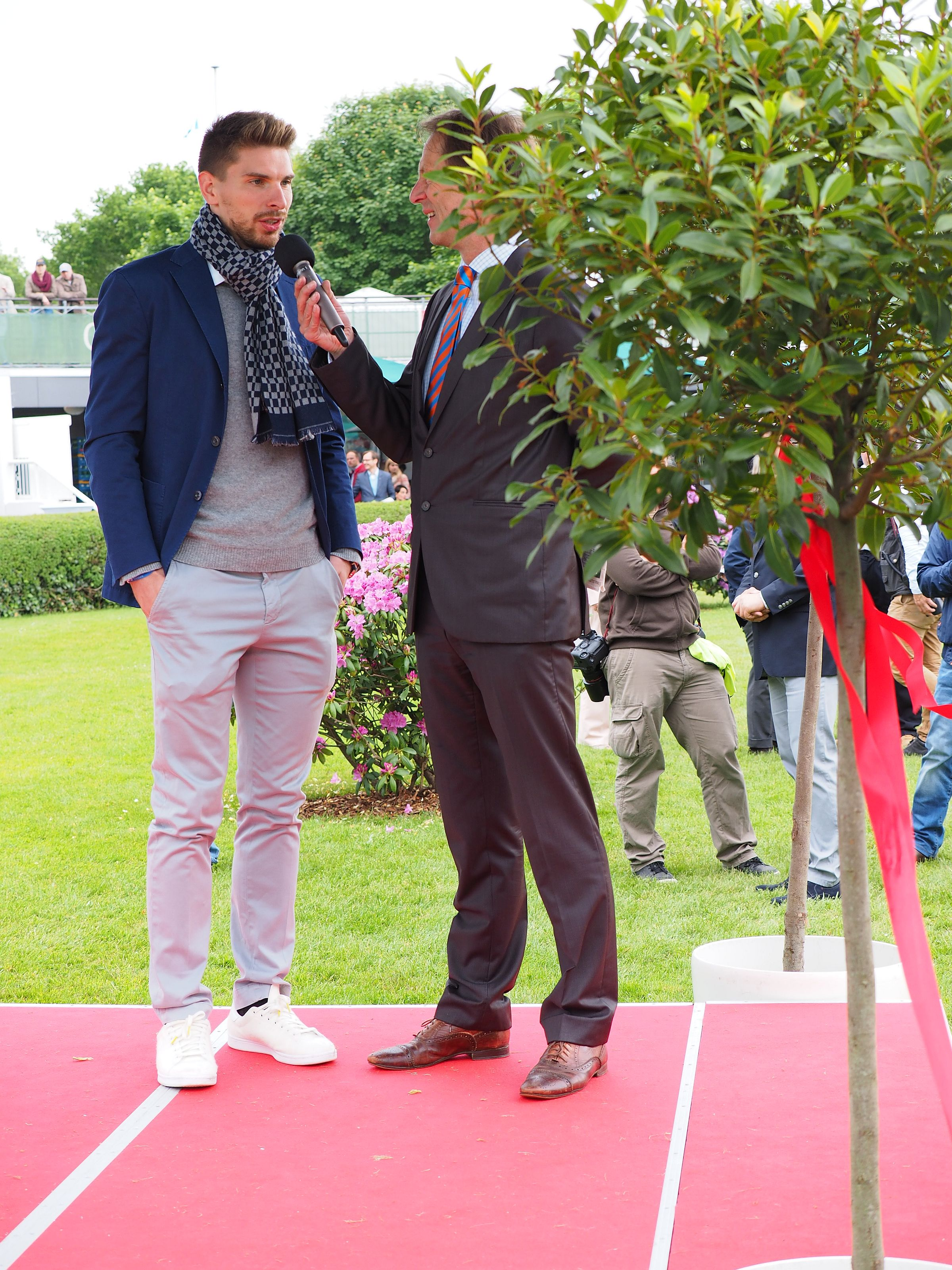
Zieler being interviewed at Neue Bult in 2015.

Ahead of the 2015–16 season, newly appointed manager Michael Frontzeck expected Zieler to be the new captain following the departure of Lars Stindl. Instead, Christian Schulz was appointed as the club's captain. Zieler captained his first match at Hannover 96 on 12 September 2015 against Borussia Dortmund, which saw Hannover 96 lose 4–2. In a 2–1 win over Hamburg on 1 November 2015, Zieler broke the club's record of 153 appearances; a record formerly held by Hans-Josef Hellingrath. Zieler went to captain Hannover on ten more occasions in the 2015–16 season, but was unable to help the club avoid relegation. Despite the relegation, Zieler continued to remain the first choice goalkeeper for the 2015–16 season, both in the league and in the cup competitions, playing 3240 minutes in all competitions.

It was announced on 16 April 2016 that Zieler would leave the club following the club's relegation, despite having a year to his contract left, citing his desire to continue playing top–flight football. Zieler was linked with a move to Manchester City, RB Leipzig and Köln. With his 3.5 million Euro release revealed, Zieler's departure to Hannover appeared to be increasingly imminent.

During his time at Hannover 96, Zieler was ever-present in each of Hannover's 34 league games over the next five seasons, which culminated in their relegation. He faced more shots on target than any other goalkeeper in the 2015–16 Bundesliga season, making a total of 148 saves, second behind Oliver Baumann, with 90 of them coming from inside the penalty area.

=== Leicester City ===
On 3 June 2016, Zieler returned to England for the first time in six years, signing for champions Leicester City on a four-year deal for an undisclosed fee. Upon joining the club, Zieler stated that the chance to join the English Champions and play in the Champions League was too good of an opportunity to turn down and was allocated the number 21 shirt. Zieler made his Leicester debut on 27 August 2016, replacing the injured Kasper Schmeichel in the 57th minute of the club's 2–1 home win against Swansea City. However, his spell at the club was not to be a successful one: having failed to dislodge Schmeichel from the starting line-up, Zieler made only 13 appearances for Leicester. Given that the team had another reserve goalkeeper in Ben Hamer, the club chose to sell Zieler to VfB Stuttgart for an undisclosed fee after just one season.

=== VfB Stuttgart ===
On 11 July 2017, Zieler signed a three-year contract with newly promoted Bundesliga side VfB Stuttgart. In his first season at the club, the team performed well, ending the season in 7th place, while Zieler started every match. During his second season, Stuttgart experienced a severe slump, which resulted in a 16th-place finish and the club's eventual relegation, after losing to Union Berlin in the 2018–19 play-offs. Although Zieler again started in every match, the goalkeeper had a difficult season. In a match against Werder Bremen on 29 September 2018, he was involved in a memorable incident: after a throw-in from his teammate Borna Sosa, he caused an own goal by briefly touching the ball as it rolled towards goal. The own goal generated significant media attention since the goal would not have counted had it not been touched by Zieler before crossing the goal line. Stuttgart went on to win the game.

=== Return to Hannover 96 ===
After being relegated from the Bundesliga, Stuttgart elected to re-organise its goalkeeping position and to move on from Zieler. Thus, it was announced in June 2019 that he would return to his long-time club Hannover 96, who had also been relegated that season. The club played an underwhelming 2019–20 season in the 2. Bundesliga and failed to return to the Bundesliga after a sixth-place finish. Zieler played as the team's starting goalkeeper for most of the year but fell out of favour with manager Kenan Koçak. Therefore, at the beginning of the 2020–21 season, the club announced that he was no longer in its first-team plans. In early August 2020, club chairman Martin Kind stirred controversy by publicly belittling Zieler and encouraging the player to seek a new employer.

=== 1. FC Köln ===
After Hannover 96 made it clear that Zieler would no longer be part of their playing squad, it emerged that his former youth club 1. FC Köln were interested in his services. On 13 August, the club announced they had signed Zieler on a one-year loan deal.

Zieler returned to 1. FC Köln permanently ahead of the 2025–26 season on a two-year contract.

== International career ==
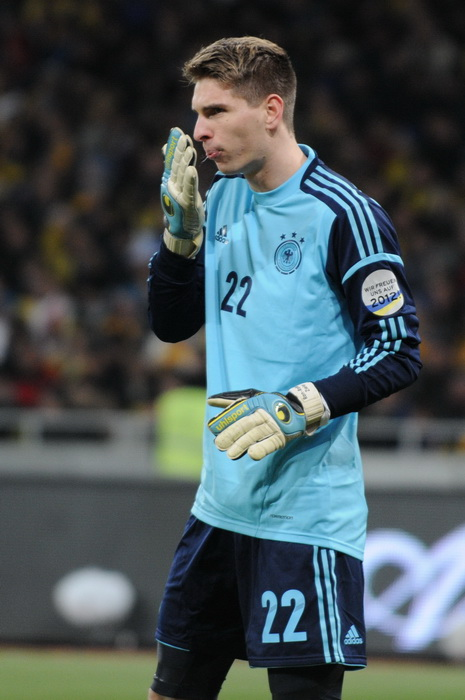
Zieler playing for the national team against Ukraine on 11 November 2011.

In 2008, Zieler kept goal for the German under-19 side that won the 2008 UEFA European Under-19 Championship and played with the U-20 at 2009 FIFA U-20 World Cup.

He was called up to the senior squad in August 2011, at first without making an appearance.

On 11 November 2011, 22-year-old Zieler played in the senior side 3–3 draw against Ukraine and was the 50th debutant of the Joachim Löw-era. He conceded all three goals within 17 minutes in the first half, without having saved a single shot until half time break, but observers found that all three goals were not his fault, and in the second half he showed a couple of brilliant saves to keep the score down. He is the first keeper since 1954 to concede as many as 3 goals (or more) in a debut match for Germany.

On 28 May 2012, Zieler was named the third goalkeeper of the German squad for the 2012 European Championship, remaining as back-up as they reached the semi-finals. On 15 August 2012, he started in net in a friendly match against Argentina and was sent off, becoming the first, and only, German goalkeeper to earn a red card since the founding of the Germany national team. He was sent off after half an hour for conceding a penalty with a foul on José Sosa, but replacement Marc-André ter Stegen saved the penalty from Lionel Messi.

On 2 June 2014, Zieler was again named the third goalkeeper of the German squad for the 2014 FIFA World Cup, remaining as back-up as they reached the final and won it for the fourth time. However, in the 2016 European Championship, Zieler was left out of the 23-man squad for Germany.

== Personal life ==
On New Year's Eve 2015, Zieler was at The Address Downtown Dubai and was on the 12th floor when a fire broke out. He escaped unharmed and returned to Germany on an emergency passport.

== Career statistics ==
=== Club ===
As of match played 29 October 2025

Appearances and goals by club, season and competition
| Club | Season | League | | | National cup (Note: Includes DFB-Pokal) | | Continental | | Other | | Total | | Ref. |
| Club | Season | Division | Apps | Goals | Apps | Goals | Apps | Goals | Apps | Goals | Apps | Goals | Ref. |
|---|---|---|---|---|---|---|---|---|---|---|---|---|---|
| Manchester United | 2008–09 | Premier League | 0 | 0 | 0 | 0 | 0 | 0 | 0 | 0 | 0 | 0 | |
| Manchester United | 2009–10 | Premier League | 0 | 0 | 0 | 0 | 0 | 0 | 0 | 0 | 0 | 0 | |
| Manchester United | Total | | 0 | 0 | 0 | 0 | 0 | 0 | 0 | 0 | 0 | 0 | — |
| Northampton Town (loan) | 2008–09 | League One | 2 | 0 | 0 | 0 | — | | — | | 2 | 0 | |
| Hannover 96 II | 2010–11 | Regionalliga Nord | 15 | 0 | — | | — | | — | | 15 | 0 | |
| Hannover 96 | 2010–11 | Bundesliga | 15 | 0 | 0 | 0 | — | | — | | 15 | 0 | |
| Hannover 96 | 2011–12 | Bundesliga | 34 | 0 | 2 | 0 | 13 (Note: Appearances in UEFA Europa League) | 0 | — | | 49 | 0 | |
| Hannover 96 | 2012–13 | Bundesliga | 34 | 0 | 3 | 0 | 12 | 0 | — | | 49 | 0 | |
| Hannover 96 | 2013–14 | Bundesliga | 34 | 0 | 3 | 0 | — | | — | | 37 | 0 | |
| Hannover 96 | 2014–15 | Bundesliga | 34 | 0 | 2 | 0 | — | | — | | 36 | 0 | |
| Hannover 96 | 2015–16 | Bundesliga | 34 | 0 | 2 | 0 | — | | — | | 36 | 0 | |
| Hannover 96 | Total | | 185 | 0 | 11 | 0 | 25 | 0 | — | | 221 | 0 | — |
| Leicester City | 2016–17 | Premier League | 9 | 0 | 0 | 0 | 1 (Note: Appearance in UEFA Champions League) | 0 | 1 (Note: Appearance in English League Cup) | 0 | 11 | 0 | |
| VfB Stuttgart | 2017–18 | Bundesliga | 34 | 0 | 3 | 0 | — | | — | | 37 | 0 | |
| VfB Stuttgart | 2018–19 | Bundesliga | 34 | 0 | 1 | 0 | — | | 2 (Note: Appearances in relegation play-offs) | 0 | 37 | 0 | |
| VfB Stuttgart | Total | | 68 | 0 | 4 | 0 | — | | 2 | 0 | 74 | 0 | — |
| Hannover 96 | 2019–20 | 2. Bundesliga | 31 | 0 | 1 | 0 | — | | — | | 32 | 0 | |
| Hannover 96 | 2021–22 | 2. Bundesliga | 25 | 0 | 2 | 0 | — | | — | | 27 | 0 | |
| Hannover 96 | 2022–23 | 2. Bundesliga | 30 | 0 | 0 | 0 | — | | — | | 30 | 0 | |
| Hannover 96 | 2023–24 | 2. Bundesliga | 34 | 0 | 0 | 0 | — | | — | | 34 | 0 | |
| Hannover 96 | 2024–25 | 2. Bundesliga | 34 | 0 | 0 | 0 | — | | — | | 34 | 0 | |
| Hannover 96 | Total | | 154 | 0 | 3 | 0 | — | | — | | 157 | 0 | — |
| 1. FC Köln (loan) | 2020–21 | Bundesliga | 1 | 0 | 0 | 0 | — | | — | | 1 | 0 | |
| 1. FC Köln | 2025–26 | Bundesliga | 0 | 0 | 2 | 0 | — | | — | | 2 | 0 | |
| Career total | | | 434 | 0 | 20 | 0 | 26 | 0 | 3 | 0 | 483 | 0 | — |

=== International ===
Appearances and goals by national team and year
| National team | Year | Apps | Goals |
|---|---|---|---|
| Germany | 2011 | 1 | 0 |
| Germany | 2012 | 1 | 0 |
| Germany | 2014 | 2 | 0 |
| Germany | 2015 | 2 | 0 |
| Total | | 6 | 0 |

== Honours ==
Germany U19

- UEFA European Under-19 Championship: 2008

Germany

- FIFA World Cup: 2014
