= Deniz Ayçiçek =

German footballer

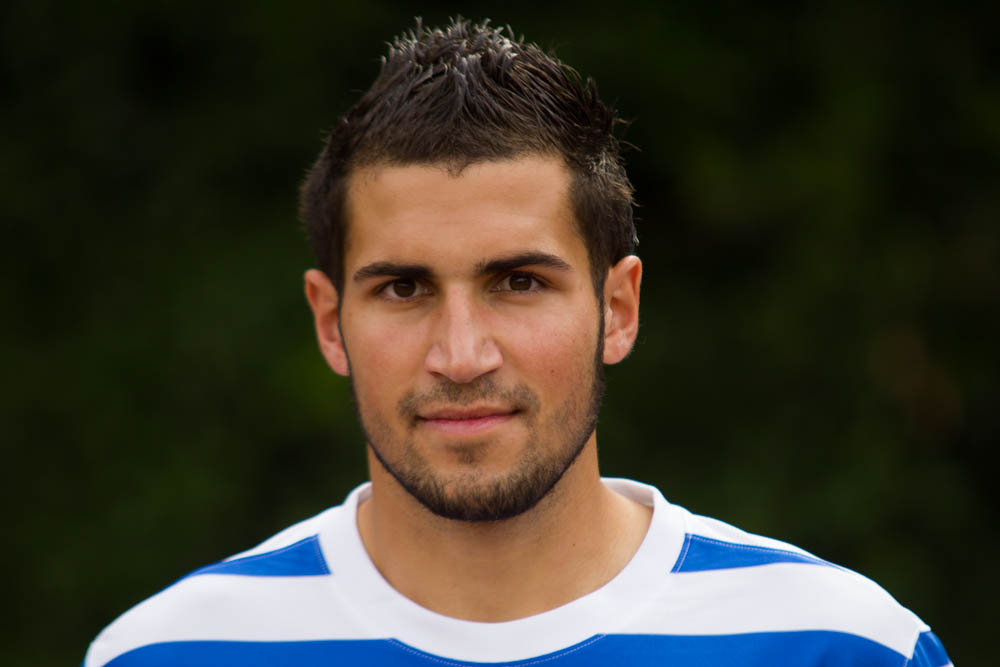
- Deniz Aycicek in 2013

Personal information
- Date of birth: 5 June 1990 (age 36)
- Place of birth: Neustadt am Rübenberge
- Height: 1.77 m (5 ft 10 in)
- Position: Midfielder

Team information
- Current team: TSV Kolenfeld
- Number: 10

Youth career
- RSV Rehburg
- –2002: TSV Loccum
- 2002–2009: Hannover 96

Senior career*
Years	Team	Apps	(Gls)
2009–2013	Hannover 96 II	91	(19)
2011–2013	Hannover 96	0	(0)
2013–2015	MSV Duisburg	21	(2)
2015–2020	1.FC Wunstorf	89	(25)
2020–	TSV Kolenfeld	0	(0)
- * Club domestic league appearances and goals as of 14 January 2021

Deniz Ayçiçek (born 5 June 1990) is a German footballer, who plays for TSV Kolenfeld.

On the career mode option of the video game FIFA 13, players using Ayçiçek experienced a glitch where he went from 58 overall to 90+ overall in the space of a few seasons, the quickest growing FIFA career mode overall to date.
