= Karim Haggui =

Tunisian footballer (born 1984)

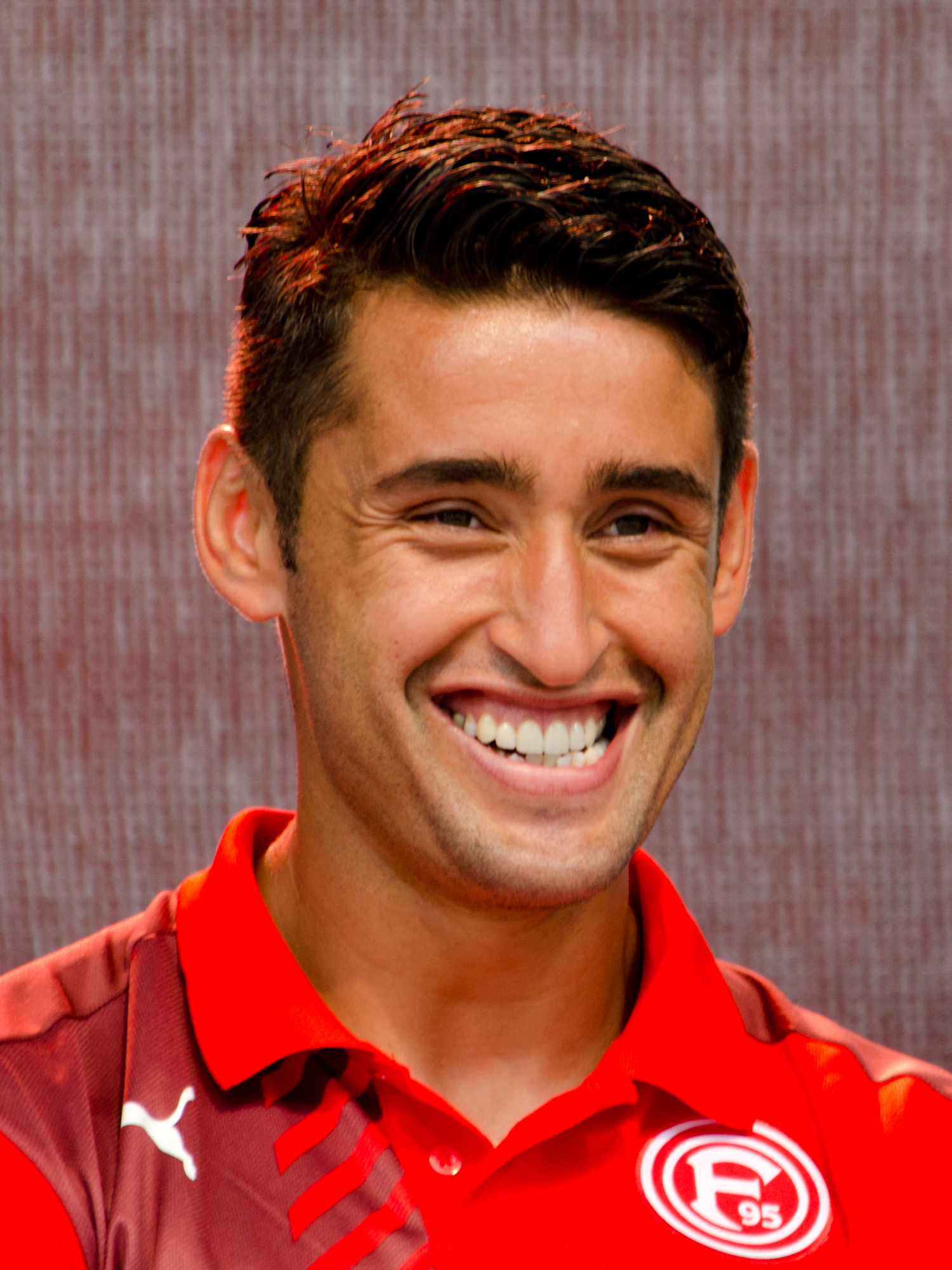
- Haggui in 2015

Personal information
- Full name: Karim Haggui
- Date of birth: 20 January 1984 (age 42)
- Place of birth: Kasserine, Tunisia
- Height: 1.90 m (6 ft 3 in)
- Position: Defender

Youth career
- 1998–2000: AS Kasserine
- 2000–2003: Etoile du Sahel

Senior career*
Years	Team	Apps	(Gls)
2003–2004	Etoile du Sahel		
2004–2006	RC Strasbourg	43	(2)
2006–2009	Bayer Leverkusen	59	(3)
2009–2013	Hannover 96	107	(7)
2013–2015	VfB Stuttgart	6	(1)
2014–2015	VfB Stuttgart II	8	(1)
2015–2016	Fortuna Düsseldorf	29	(1)
2016–2018	FC St. Gallen	52	(3)

International career^{‡}
2003–2013	Tunisia	82	(5)
Medal record
Men's football
Representing Tunisia
Africa Cup of Nations
Winner	2004 Tunisia
- * Club domestic league appearances and goals as of 23:46, 17 May 2016 (UTC) ‡ National team caps and goals as of 29 February 2012

Karim Haggui (Arabic: كَرِيم حَقِّيّ; born 20 January 1984) is a Tunisian former footballer who played as a defender. His last club was FC St. Gallen.

== Club career ==
=== Early career ===
Born in Kasserine, Haggui started his career in 1998 with AS Kasserine in his home town, eventually moving to Etoile du Sahel two years later and starting his professional career there in 2003. He only spent one season as a professional with Etoile du Sahel and moved to French club RC Strasbourg in the summer of 2004.

=== RC Strasbourg ===
Haggui made his Ligue 1 debut in Strasbourg's first game of the 2004–05 season, a 2–1 away defeat at SC Bastia on 7 August 2004, coming on as a substitute. He did not play very much in the first half of the season, but eventually managed to find his place as a regular in the final few months of the campaign, making a total of 20 Ligue 1 appearances in his first season with Strasbourg. The club also won the French League Cup that season and qualified for the UEFA Cup.

He started his second season with Strasbourg as a regular, scoring his only two Ligue 1 goals with a brace in the club's 4–2 defeat at home to Toulouse on 24 September 2005. After appearing in 11 consecutive league games since the beginning of the season, he lost his place as a regular, nevertheless managing to make a total of 23 appearances in the league that season. He also appeared in six UEFA Cup matches before Strasbourg were knocked out by Basel in the round of 16, scoring the opening goal in their 5–0 win at home to Grazer AK on 29 September 2005.

=== Bayer Leverkusen ===
Strasbourg were relegated to Ligue 2 following their 19th-place finish in the 2005–06 Ligue 1 season and Haggui decided to join German Bundesliga side Bayer Leverkusen in the summer of 2006 on an undisclosed fee.

Haggui made his Bayer Leverkusen debut on 29 July 2006 against Schalke 04 in the German League Cup, playing the entire match which Leverkusen lost 9–8 on penalties. He once again played the entire match on his Bundesliga debut in Leverkusen's first match of the 2006–07 season, a 3–0 win at home to Alemannia Aachen on 12 August 2006.

He experienced mixed fortunes in his first season with Leverkusen, playing regularly for the majority of the season, but also receiving a total of 11 yellow cards in the league and delivering a couple of poor performances, most notably against Bochum in April 2007, where he was substituted only 23 minutes into the game after being directly responsible for two of Bochum's three goals in the opening 22 minutes. He finished the season with a total of 24 Bundesliga appearances. His first and only goal for Leverkusen that season came in their 2–1 away defeat at RC Lens in the UEFA Cup, a match where he was later sent off following his second yellow card. He appeared in a total of nine UEFA Cup matches before Leverkusen were knocked out by Osasuna in the quarter-finals.

He once again played regularly for Leverkusen in his second season with the club, eventually scoring his first Bundesliga goal when he netted the opening goal in their 2–0 win at home to Bochum on 15 September 2007. He added another Bundesliga goal to his tally when he opened the scoring in Leverkusen's 4–1 win at home to Nürnberg on 16 March 2008. He once again finished the season with a total of 24 Bundesliga appearances. In the UEFA Cup, he appeared in 11 games before Leverkusen were knocked out by eventual winners of the competition, Zenit St. Petersburg, in the quarter-finals. His only UEFA Cup goal that season came when he scored the fourth goal in Leverkusen's 5–1 win at home to Galatasaray in the third round.

However, he lost his place in the team in his third season with Leverkusen, only appearing in 11 Bundesliga games throughout the season. He did, however, manage to score his third Bundesliga goal when he opened the scoring in Leverkusen's 5–2 win at home to 1899 Hoffenheim on 30 August 2008, his first game that season. He also appeared in two games during Leverkusen's run to the final of the DFB-Pokal, but was left an unused substitute in the Berlin final which they lost 1–0 to Werder Bremen.

=== Hannover 96 ===
On 1 June 2009, just two days after the German Cup final, Haggui decided to leave Leverkusen on a free transfer and signed a two-year contract with Bundesliga rivals Hannover 96.

Haggui made his competitive debut for Hannover on 2 August 2009 in their 3–1 defeat at Eintracht Trier in the first round of the German Cup, playing all 90 minutes. He also played the entire match on his Bundesliga debut for the club, in a 1–0 defeat at Hertha BSC on 8 August 2009. He scored his first competitive goal for Hannover in their 5–2 Bundesliga win at home to SC Freiburg on 3 October 2009, netting Hannover's third goal of the match. Haggui scored two own goals in a 5–3 loss to Borussia Mönchengladbach on 12 December 2009, thereby defeating his own team.

In August 2010, Haggui returned to the pitch for his second season as a starter with Hannover 96.

=== VfB Stuttgart ===
On 2 September 2013, Haggui signed a two-year deal with VfB Stuttgart, for an undisclosed fee.

=== Fortuna Düsseldorf ===
For the 2015–16 season Haggui moved to Fortuna Düsseldorf.

=== FC St. Gallen ===
On 15 August 2016, he joined FC St. Gallen on a two-year contract.

== International career ==
Haggui has been a member of the Tunisian national football team since 2003, making his international debut on 20 August 2003 in their friendly match against Guinea.

His first major tournament with the team was the 2004 African Cup of Nations on home soil in Tunisia. Haggui, who was the youngest member of the Tunisian squad at the tournament, appeared in all of the team's six matches on their way to the title. In the semifinals, he conceded a penalty which gave Nigeria the lead, but then he scored the decisive penalty as the team won 5–3 in the penalty shootout to book a place in the final, which they won 2–1 against Morocco. In 2004, he was also part of the Tunisian squad at the Summer Olympics, appearing in all three of the team's group matches before they were knocked out of the tournament following a third-place finish in their group.

Haggui made his second appearance at the African Cup of Nations during the 2006 finals in Egypt, appearing in all of Tunisia's four matches at the tournament. He also scored the equaliser in the quarterfinal match against Nigeria, but Tunisia eventually lost the match 6–5 on penalties and were knocked out of the tournament. The same year, he also made his FIFA World Cup debut at the 2006 finals in Germany, appearing in all of Tunisia's three group matches before they were knocked out in the first round after finishing third in their group. In the 2006 FIFA World Cup qualifying, he made a total of seven appearances and scored two goals in Tunisia's opening match of the campaign, a 4–1 win at home to Botswana on 5 June 2004.

In 2008, Haggui appeared in all of Tunisia's four matches at the African Cup of Nations in Ghana. At the tournament, Tunisia were knocked out in the quarterfinals after losing 3–2 to Cameroon in extra time, with Haggui forced to leave the pitch with an injury after 38 minutes.

== Career statistics ==
=== International ===
Scores and results list Tunisia's goal tally first, score column indicates score after each Haggui goal.

List of international goals scored by Karim Haggui
No.	Date	Venue	Opponent	Score	Result	Competition
1	14 January 2004	Stade Jerba Houmt Souk, Houmt El Souk, Tunisia	Benin	2–0	2–0	Friendly
2	5 June 2004	7 November Stadium, Radès, Tunisia	Botswana	2–0	4–1	2006 FIFA World Cup qualification
3	5 June 2004	7 November Stadium, Radès, Tunisia	Botswana	4–1	4–1	2006 FIFA World Cup qualification
4	4 February 2006	Port Said Stadium, Port Said, Egypt	Nigeria	1–1	1–1 (5–6 p)	2006 Africa Cup of Nations
5	20 June 2010	Khartoum Stadium, Khartoum, Sudan	Sudan	3–0	6–2	Friendly

== Honours ==
Bayer 04 Leverkusen

- DFB-Pokal runner-up: 2008–09

Tunisia

- Africa Cup of Nations: 2004
