= Tim Wendel (footballer) =

German footballer (born 1989)

Personal information
- Full name: Tim Wendel-Eichholz
- Date of birth: 12 January 1989 (age 37)
- Place of birth: Moers, Germany
- Height: 1.88 m (6 ft 2 in)
- Position: Centre-back

Youth career
- OSC Rheinhausen
- TV Asberg
- –2007: MSV Duisburg
- 2007–2008: Schalke 04

Senior career*
Years	Team	Apps	(Gls)
2008–2009	Schalke 04 II	27	(1)
2009	Kaiserslautern II	0	(0)
2010–2012	Hannover 96 II	69	(3)
2012–2013	TSV Havelse	29	(0)
2013–2020	Sportfreunde Lotte	170	(10)
2020–2021	Wuppertaler SV	9	(1)
2021–2022	VfB Homberg	8	(0)

Managerial career
- 2022: Sportfreunde Lotte (assistant)
- 2022: Sportfreunde Lotte
- * Club domestic league appearances and goals

Tim Wendel-Eichholz (born 12 January 1989) is a retired German footballer who played as a centre-back.

== Career ==
=== Coaching career ===
After retiring at the end of February 2022, Wendel was appointed assistant coach of his former club, Sportfreunde Lotte, on March 13, 2022. About a week later, the club sacked Andy Steinmann and appointed Wendel as new manager. Wendel left the club at the end of the season, as Fabian Lübbers was appointed manager ahead of the 2022-23 season.
