= Christian Pander =

German footballer (born 1983)

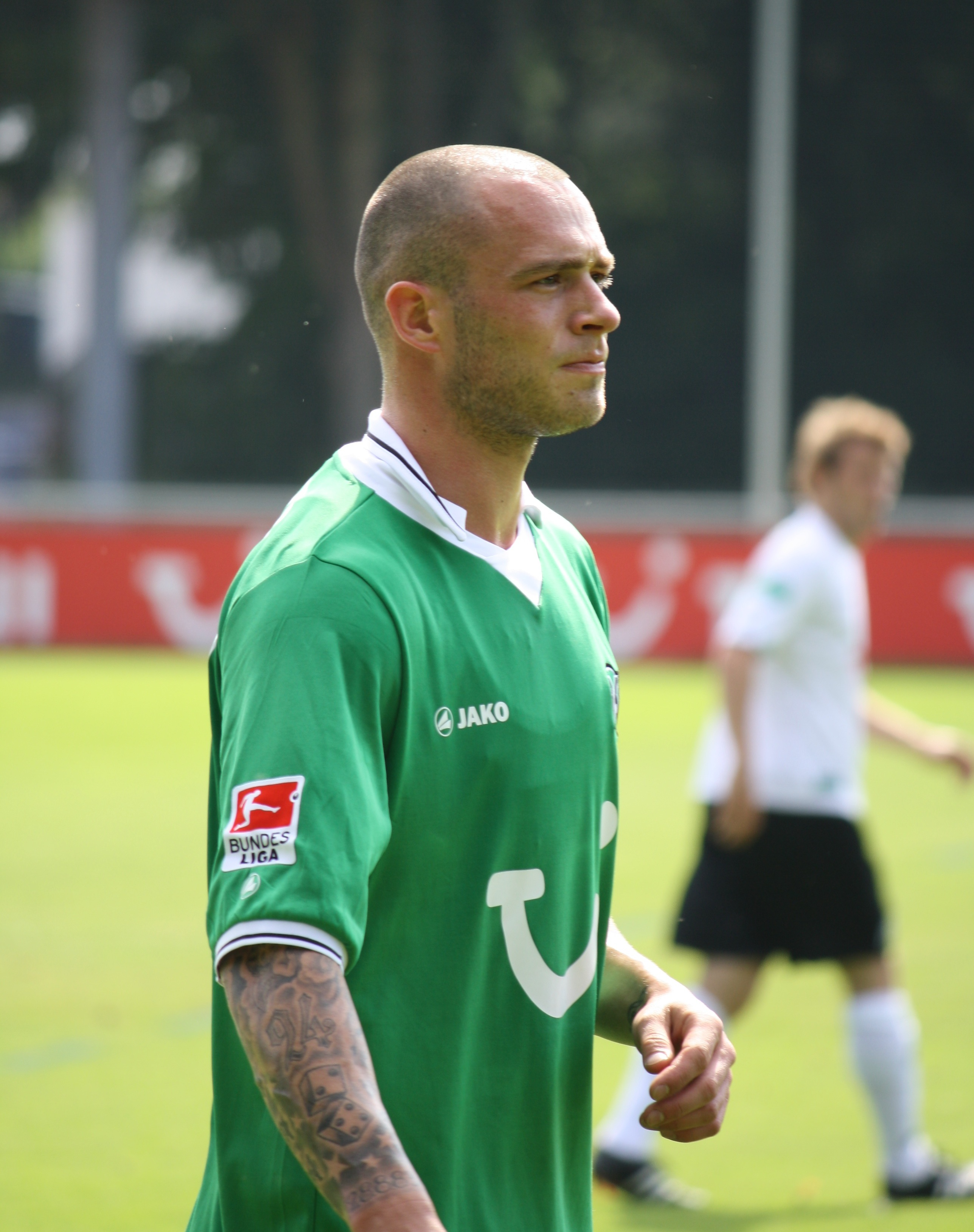
- Pander playing for Hanover in 2011

Personal information
- Full name: Christian Pander
- Date of birth: 28 August 1983 (age 43)
- Place of birth: Münster, West Germany
- Height: 1.86 m (6 ft 1 in)
- Position: Left back

Youth career
- 1992–1993: SC Nienberge
- 1993–1996: 1. FC Gievenbeck
- 1996–1997: SC Greven 09
- 1997–2001: Preußen Münster
- 2001–2003: Schalke 04

Senior career*
Years	Team	Apps	(Gls)
2002–2011	Schalke 04 II	36	(3)
2004–2011	Schalke 04	78	(5)
2011–2015	Hannover 96	63	(2)
Total		177	(10)

International career^{‡}
2004–2005	Germany U21	6	(0)
2007	Germany	2	(1)
- * Club domestic league appearances and goals as of 30 June 2015 ‡ National team caps and goals as of 25 November 2007

Christian Pander (born 28 August 1983 in Münster) is a German former footballer who played as a left back. He was known for his powerful left-foot free-kicks and willingness to burst up the left wing.

== Club career ==
=== FC Schalke 04 ===
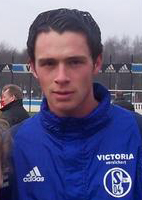
Pander during his time at Schalke 04.

Pander spent his youth career at SC Nienberge, 1. FC Gievenbeck, SC Greven 09 and Preußen Münster before becoming a product of the Schalke 04 youth system. He made his Schalke 04 debut on 19 September 2002 where he played for 17 minutes, in a 4–1 win over Gomel in the first round of the UEFA Cup and also made another appearance in the first round of the UEFA Cup the following season, in a 0–0 draw against Kamen Ingrad.

It was not until 2004 when Pander was promoted to the first team at Schalke 04 and made his Bundesliga debut on 6 August 2004 in a 1–0 away loss to Werder Bremen. However, his debut was a forgettable one when he made a mistake, leading Nelson Valdez to score the only goal in the game, though manager Jupp Heynckes praised his debut performance. Pander continued to be in the first team and scored the first goal of his professional career in a 3–2 win over Borussia Mönchengladbach on 18 September 2004. However, as the 2004–05 season progressed, Pander suffered a knee injury during a 3–0 loss against Stuttgart on 9 April 2005 and was out for the rest of the season.

Despite signing a contract with the club, keeping him until 2008, the 2005–06 season saw Pander making no appearance as he recovered from his knee injury. In April, it was announced that Pander's return was delayed when he was sidelined for six more months.

In the 2006–07 season, Pander remained sidelined and returned to training from injury in early September 2006. He made his first appearance after eighteen months on 5 November 2006, in a 2–2 draw against Bayern Munich. After that, Pander played eight of the fourteen matches, which saw Schalke 04 unbeaten between November and February, scoring two goals against Energie Cottbus and Borussia Dortmund. Pander tore his ligament in training on 26 January 2007 and was sidelined for two months. He returned to the first team on 17 March 2007 in a 1–0 win over Stuttgart and was given a handful of first team appearances until he missed out on the last game of the season, due to injury. He made sixteen appearances and scored two times despite the injuries.

In the 2007–08 season, Pander started the season well when he scored in the first round of the DFB-Pokal, in a 9–0 win over Eintracht Trier on 5 August 2007. On 14 August 2007, Pander signed a contract extension with the club, keeping him until 2011. Four days later on 18 August 2007, he scored and set up one of the goals, in a 4–1 win over Borussia Dortmund. The rest of the 2007 saw Pander again sidelined with injuries. It was not until on 8 March 2008 when he returned to the first team, making his first start in months, in a 2–0 win over Arminia Bielefeld. After suffering from another injury, Pander made his return to the first team in the last game of the season, where he provided two assists in a 2–0 win over Nürnberg. He scored two times in twenty-six appearances in all competitions.

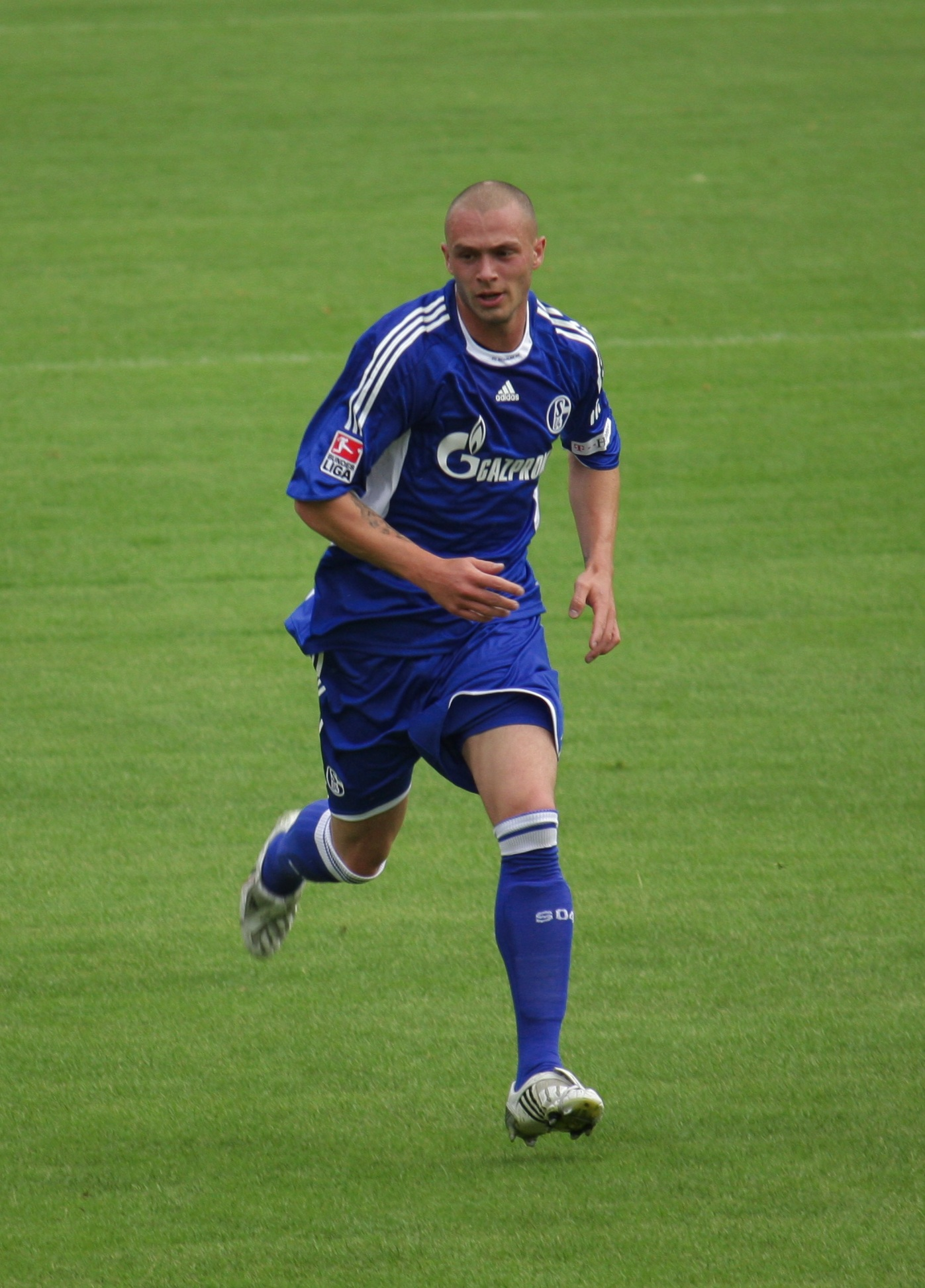
Pander playing for the club in 2008.

The 2008–09 season saw Pander making a good start to the season by helping the club go unbeaten throughout August. Against Atlético Madrid in the Champions League qualifier, he scored in the first leg in a 1–0 win, but was sent–off in the second leg, which saw Schalke 04 eliminated from the Champions League. Three weeks later, he was once again sent-off for a second bookable offence, in a 3–3 draw against Borussia Dortmund. Pander scored his first goal of the season on 2 October 2008 in a UEFA Cup match, resulting a 1–1 draw against APOEL. However, Pander's season was overshadowed with injuries. After scoring in the league against Energie Cottbus on 17 April 2009, Pander's last competitive game for Schalke was on 10 May 2009 where he injured his knee against Borussia Mönchengladbach and had to be taken off in the 16th minute. Despite this, Pander finished the 2008–09 season, making twenty-three appearances and scoring two times in all competitions.

Pander missed out nearly the whole 2009–10 season, as he continued to recover from his knee injury despite having hopes of making a comeback attempt. He made his comeback in April. The 2010–11 season saw Pander continue to recover from his knee injury and he returned on 5 December 2010 where he played for 13 minutes in a 2–0 win over Bayern Munich. After a four appearances, Pander suffered a toe injury that saw him sidelined for the rest of the 2010–11 season.

At the end of the 2010–11 season, it was announced that Pander's contract with Schalke 04 would not be renewed following the expiry of his contract.

=== Hannover 96 ===
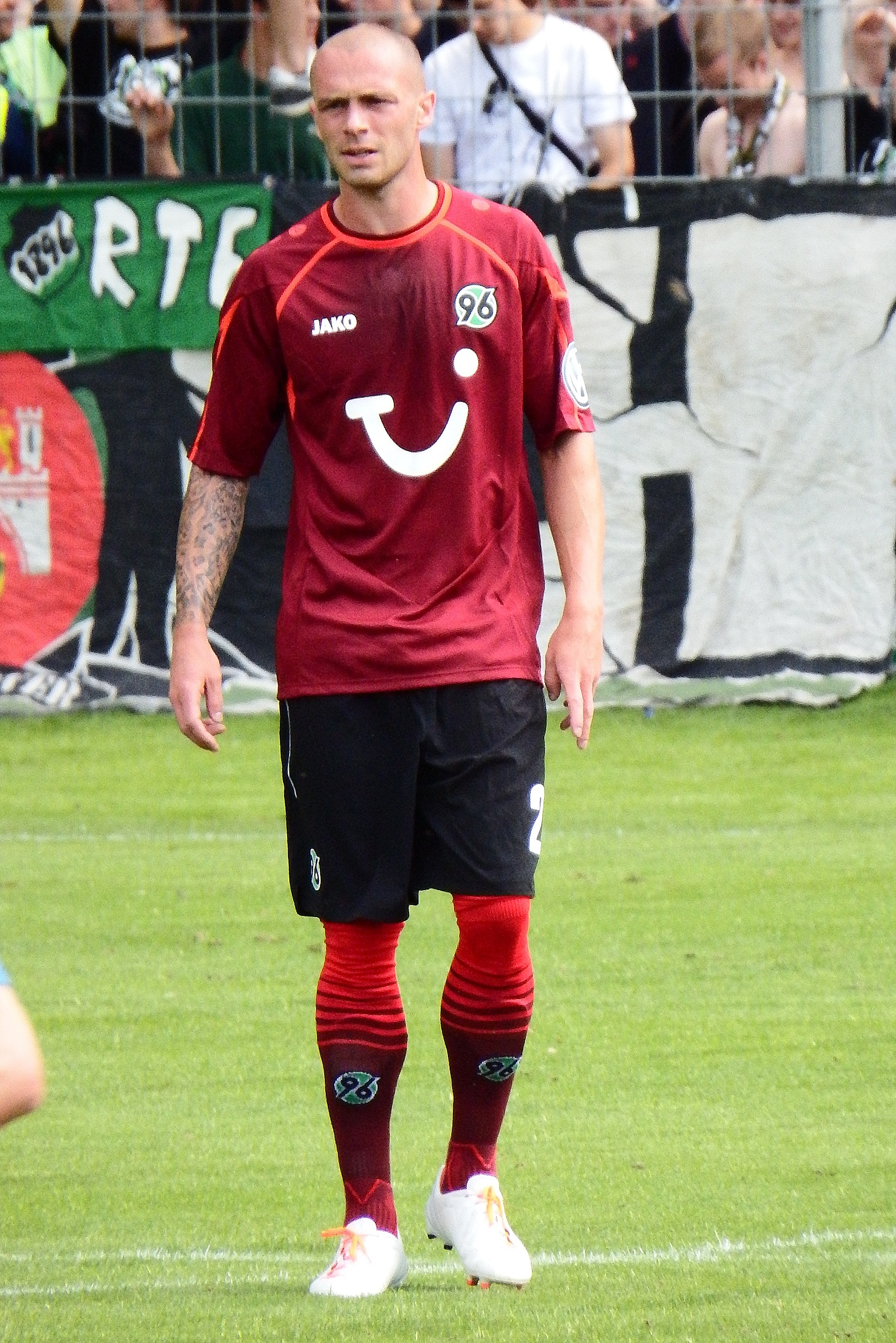
Pander playing for Hannover 96 in 2013.

Pander agreed to join league rival Hannover 96 on 19 June 2011, signing a one-year contract.

Pander made his Hannover 96 debut in the opening game of the season in a 2–1 win over Hoffenheim. Then in the group stage matches in the UEFA Europa League, Pander scored two goals against Vorskla Poltava and Copenhagen. On 23 October 2011, Pander scored his first league goal for the club, in a 2–1 win over Bayern Munich. It was announced on 19 January 2012 that Pander extended his contract with the club until 2015. On 19 February 2012, Pander scored his second league goal of the season and set up two goals in a 4–2 win over Stuttgart. After suffering from an illness, he made his first team return from illness on 3 March 2012, in a 2–2 against Augsburg. Pander made forty-four appearances and scored four times in all competitions.

In the 2012–13 season, Pander started the season well when he scored his first goal of the season in a 3–0 win over St Patrick's Athletic in the UEFA Europa League Qualifiers and went on to win 5–0 on aggregate. However, the 2012–13 season saw Pander suffering injuries restricting him to twenty-seven appearances in all competitions.

In the 2013–14 season, Pander appeared in the opening game of the season, in a 2–0 win over Wolfsburg. However, he suffered a ligament injury and after an operation, it was announced that he was out for months. It was not until on 7 December 2013 when he returned to the first team in a 4–2 loss against Stuttgart. His return was short-lived as he twisted his knee. This injury kept him again out for months. He made his return against Hamburg on 12 April 2014. Although his season was disrupted by injuries, Pander went on to make ten appearances in all competitions.

The 2014–15 season was again injury-ridden and restricted his appearances to nine in all competitions.

At the end of the 2014–15 season, he left Hannover as his contract ran out. Pander previously hinted that he would like to end his career in America once he left Hannover 96.

== International career ==
After being featured for the Germany U20 and Germany U21, Pander was called up by the national team for the first time on 17 August 2007.

Pander was capped twice for his country. He scored on his debut for Germany on 22 August 2007, a powerful strike from roughly 25 yards against England. The game ended with Germany winning 2–1. Pander also made another appearance for the national team, a 2–0 win over Wales on 8 September 2007. It was his last one.

== Personal life ==
Pander's hobbies include listening to R'n'B and hip hop music. Outside of football, Pander is working to become a businessman.

== International goals ==
Christian Pander: International goals
No.	Date	Venue	Opponent	Score	Result	Competition
1	22 August 2007	Wembley Stadium, London, England	England	1-2	1-2	Friendly

== Honours ==
=== Club ===
Schalke 04

- DFB-Pokal: 2010–11
