= Sérgio Pinto (footballer, born 1980) =

Portuguese footballer

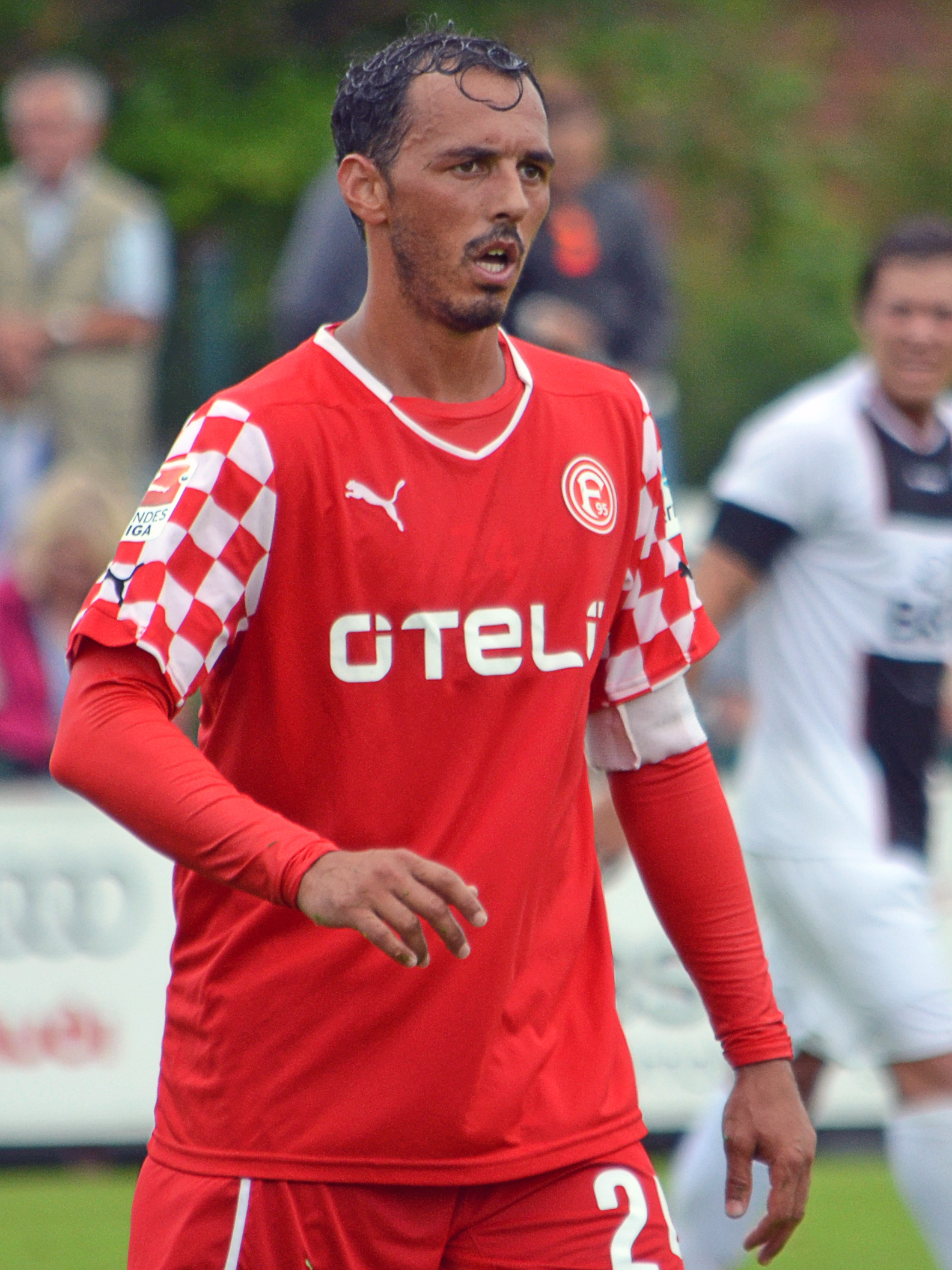
- Pinto with Fortuna Düsseldorf in 2014

Personal information
- Full name: Sérgio Ricardo da Silva Pinto
- Date of birth: 16 October 1980 (age 46)
- Place of birth: Vila Nova de Gaia, Portugal
- Height: 1.76 m (5 ft 9 in)
- Position: Winger

Youth career
- 1989–1993: Porto
- 1993–1995: TuS Haltern
- 1995–1999: Schalke 04

Senior career*
Years	Team	Apps	(Gls)
1999–2004	Schalke 04	23	(0)
2000–2004	Schalke 04 II	87	(35)
2004–2007	Alemannia Aachen	87	(10)
2007–2013	Hannover 96	160	(19)
2013–2014	Levante	18	(0)
2014–2016	Fortuna Düsseldorf	21	(1)
Total		396	(65)
- * Club domestic league appearances and goals

Sérgio Ricardo da Silva Pinto (born 16 October 1980) is a Portuguese former professional footballer who played as a right winger.

Having spent more than one decade playing in Germany, mainly with Schalke 04 and Hannover 96, he possessed dual nationality. He amassed Bundesliga totals of 212 matches and 21 goals over ten seasons.

== Club career ==
=== Early years and Schalke ===
Born in Vila Nova de Gaia, Porto District, Pinto played four years with Porto's youth teams, moving to Germany at the age of 12 with his family and settling in the North Rhine-Westphalia town of Haltern am See. He then continued his football development at TuS Haltern.

In 1999, Pinto made his Bundesliga debut with Schalke 04 after four years at the club as a youth, appearing twice for the first team in the 1999–2000 season, the first game being a 3–2 away loss against Bayer Leverkusen on 11 September. Most of his spell, however, was spent with the reserves, as he only took part in 21 matches more in four seasons.

=== Alemannia Aachen ===
Pinto signed for Alemannia Aachen of the 2. Bundesliga for 2004–05, for a transfer fee of €125,000. He totalled 58 league appearances in his first two years while scoring eight goals, achieving promotion in his second; on 25 November 2005, after helping to a 2–1 home win over SC Paderborn, he received the Tor des Monats (Goal of the Month) award from the ARD.

In the subsequent top-flight campaign, Pinto appeared regularly for the North Rhine-Westphalia side, netting in a 2–0 victory at Energie Cottbus on 10 March 2007, but the team eventually finished second-bottom and suffered relegation. In the ensuing summer, he reunited with former Aachen coach Dieter Hecking at Hannover 96, joining on a three-year contract that was previously agreed in February.

=== Hannover 96 ===
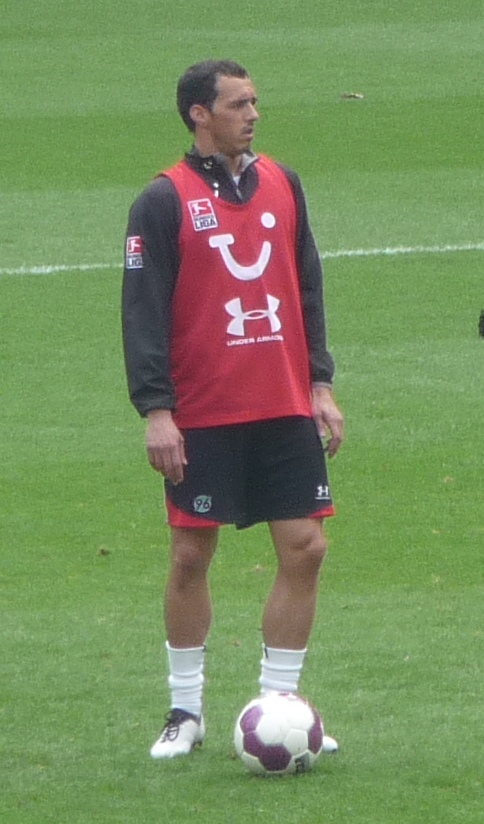
Pinto training with Hannover in 2010

Pinto played his first official game for his new club on 11 August 2007, starting and being replaced in the second half of a 1–0 home loss against Hamburger SV. He contributed 31 games and five goals – notably in a 3–1 win over Bayern Munich also at the Niedersachsenstadion– in the 2010–11 season as Hannover finished fourth and qualified for the UEFA Europa League, where he netted twice from 14 appearances in a quarter-final exit.

In late October 2011, following another league home defeat of Bayern (2–1), Pinto was accused by his opponents of "poor sportsmanship". He left the Lower Saxony side in June 2013, aged 32 and with 193 competitive appearances to his credit; he added to that 24 goals and 20 assists.

=== Later career ===
On 6 July 2013, Pinto moved to Levante from Spain, agreeing to a two-year deal. He played his first La Liga match on 18 August, featuring the first 45 minutes in a 7–0 away loss to Barcelona.

Pinto returned to Germany on 9 June 2014, signing a one-year contract with Fortuna Düsseldorf. He was released on 30 May 2016.
