= Khaled Mesfin =

German footballer

Personal information
- Full name: Khaled Mesfin-Mulugeta
- Date of birth: 2 June 1992 (age 34)
- Place of birth: Addis Ababa, Ethiopia
- Height: 1.77 m (5 ft 10 in)
- Positions: Left-back; left midfielder

Youth career
- –2011: Eintracht Frankfurt

Senior career*
Years	Team	Apps	(Gls)
2010–2011	Eintracht Frankfurt II	2	(0)
2011–2014	Hannover 96 II	33	(0)
2014–2016	Waldhof Mannheim	17	(0)
2016–2017	Inter Zaprešić	27	(0)
Total		79	(0)
- * Club domestic league appearances and goals

Khaled Mesfin-Mulugeta (born 2 June 1992) is a German former professional footballer who played as a left-back or left midfielder.

== Career ==
Mesfin was born in Addis Ababa, Ethiopia. After failing to make an appearance with Bundesliga sides Eintracht Frankfurt and Hannover 96, he joined Waldhof Mannheim in the fourth-tier Regionalliga, making 17 league appearances.

In 2016, he signed for Inter Zaprešić in the Croatian First Football League. Despite seeing to stay with the club for the long run, he left after one season.
