= Martin Kind =

German businessman

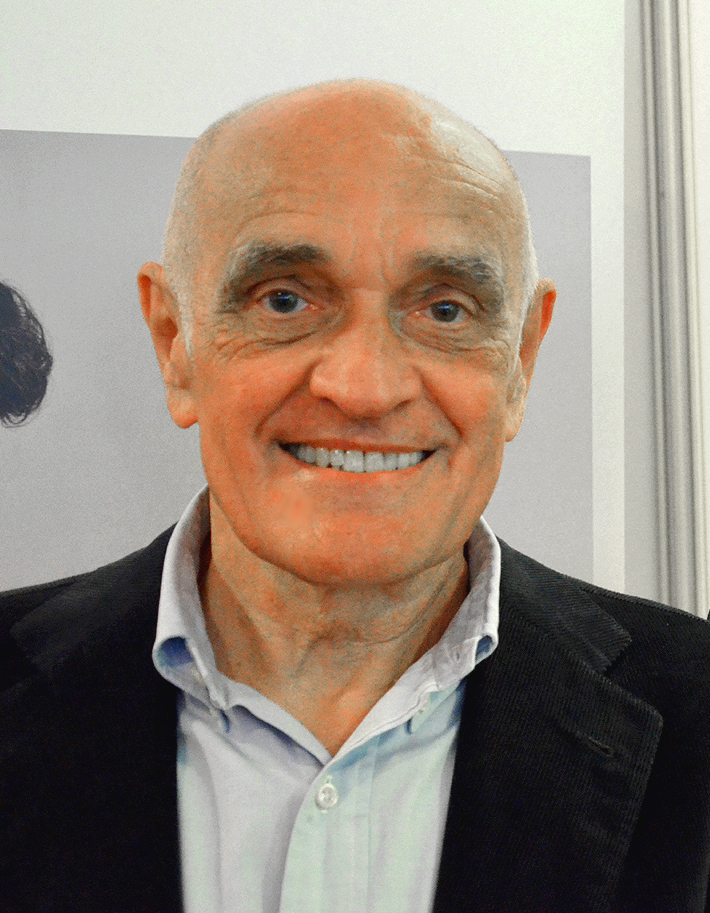
Kind in 2014

Martin Kind is a millionaire and businessman. Kind has Swiss and German nationality. He is the owner and managing director of the Kind Group.

Kind's family comes from the Chur region of Switzerland. He completed an apprenticeship at Siemens in Erlangen, Munich and Berlin. In 1970 he took over his father's hearing aid business and founded it in 1970 and expanded it into KIND Gruppe GmbH & Co. KG with around 2000 employees and over 550 specialist stores.

In 2006 he joined Hannover 96 as an investor, becoming chairman and managing director.

== Controversies ==
Kind is a vehement opponent of the 50+1 rule in the Bundesliga, which was installed as a restriction on the influence and voting rights of investors. Many clubs outsourced their professional teams to corporations. With the regulation, commercial corporations (e.g. Hannover 96 GmbH & Co. KGaA) do not have decision-making power.
