= Víctor Vázquez (artist) =

Puerto Rican artist

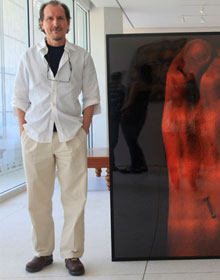
- Víctor Vázquez
- Born: San Juan, Puerto Rico
- Notable credit(s): Angel Ramos Foundation Award, Prize of adquisition, Museo de Arte Contemporáneo de Puerto Rico. Best Book Award of the year “The Realm of Waiting”, Puerto Rico Art Critics Association. Scholarship for Graduate Studies from New York University and New York State for Study abroad in India, China and Japan. Fellowship from Seton Hall University, New Jersey, United StatesRochester
- Website: http://www.victorvazquezpr.com

Víctor Vázquez is a photographer and a contemporary conceptual artist born in San Juan, Puerto Rico. Víctor Vázquez has been working as an artist for more than 20 years, creating photographs, three-dimensional objects, videos and installation works in which the human body figures both conceptually and formally. Vázquez offers a series of semiotic constructs that navigate identity, ritual, politics and anthropological inquiry. Themes include the duality of language and meaning and the relationships between nature and culture. He was an artist in resident at Cuerpos Pintados, Fundacion America in Santiago, Chile, in the year of 2002 and at Proyecto ´ace Art Center in Buenos Aires in the year 2006.

== Education ==
Received a BFA from the University of Puerto Rico and educated on the doctoral level at New York University before traveling to India, China and Japan to study art, literature and cultural history.

== Work ==
Víctor Vázquez Works are a complex amalgam of different medium. They are often difficult to decipher, yet invariably yield layers of profound meaning. His range is broad, and although he is best known for his photographs, he is essentially a maker of objects, video and installation. Vázquez art has been focused in exploring ideas related with the construction of knowledge, history, Memory, identity and migration. The intention has been to investigate and reflect on how the state imposes, reproduces and legitimizes acceptable social practices. His book "The Realm of Waiting", published in 1990 and produced by the Humanities of Art and the Ponce Museum of Art in Puerto Rico was awarded best book of art of the year by the Puerto Rico Art Critic Association for been one of the first works of art that has dealt with the Aid Epidemic in the United States.

His work has been shown in Paris, France, Germany, Amsterdam, Spain, New York City, Los Angeles, Chicago, Puerto Rico, the Caribbean and South America. He has participated in numerous biennial and Art Festival (notably, Habana Biennial, 1995-1997), Cuenca (1997), São Paulo (1995), Foto Fest (1994). His work is part of the collection of the Bibliothèque Nationale in Paris, the Museum of fine art in Houston, Texas, Museum of Art of Puerto Rico, and the Smithsonian Institution, OAS Art Museum in Washington DC.

=== Selected solo exhibitions ===
- 2011 - SLUCAG - Southeastern. Louisiana University Contemporary Art Gallery, Louisiana, United States (Curated by Dale Newkirk)
- 2009 - Displacement, Dislocation and Encounter. Seraphin Gallery, Philadelphia, United States
- 2008 - Tierra de Mudos. New York Photo Festival, Dumbo Art Center, Brooklyn, New York
- Body to Body. Museo de Arte Contemporáneo Puerto Rico, Puerto Rico
- 2007 - Dialogues. Museo de Arte de Ponce, Ponce, Puerto Rico
- 2006 - Selected Works, Galerie Lina Davidov, Paris, France
- Liquids and Signs. Espacio Proyecto ACE, Buenos Aires, Argentina
- Liquids and Signs. Walter Otero Gallery, San Juan, Puerto Rico
- 2005 - Selected Works. Walter Otero Gallery, San Juan, Puerto Rico
- El Ojo Ajeno. Photography Center, Lima, Peru
- Liquids and Signs. Martha Schneider Gallery, Chicago, Illinois, United States
- 2004 - Liquids and Signs, Seraphin Gallery, Philadelphia, United States
- 2003 - Requiem for / by a Culture. Museo de Arte de Puerto Rico, San Juan, Puerto Rico
- L.A. International Biennial Art Invitational. Couturier Gallery, Los Angeles, United States
- Ancestros. Galerie Baudoin Lebon, Paris, France
- Borders. Seraphin Gallery, Philadelphia, United States
- 2001 - Body and Memory. Installation, Galeria Universidad del Sagrado Corazón, San Juan, Puerto Rico
- Recent Works. Seraphin Gallery, Philadelphia, United States
- Selected Works. Galería de Arte Contemporáneo David Pérez-Mac Collum, Guayaquil, Ecuador
- 2000 - Cultura-Natura, Museo de las Américas, San Juan, Puerto Rico
- Recent Works. Photography/Installation, Sicardi Gallery, Houston, Texas, United States
- 1999 - The House of Souls. Martha Schneider Gallery, Chicago, Illinois, United States
- The House of Souls. Centro Wifredo Lam, Havana, Cuba
- 1997 - Body and the Bird. Martha Schneider Gallery, Chicago, Illinois, United States
- Cuenca Biennial, Cuenca, Ecuador
- 1996 - Body and the Bird. Galería Botello, San Juan, Puerto Rico
- 1994 - The Self Portrait and Extended Body. Galería Botello, San Juan, Puerto Rico
- 1993 - The Realm of Waiting. Hostos Gallery, Hostos Community College, Bronx, New York, United States
- 1992 - The Realm of Waiting. Museo de Arte de Ponce, Ponce, Puerto Rico
- 1991 - Victor Vazquez’s Photography. Galería Latinoamericana, San Juan, Puerto Rico
- 1989 - Rites. Galería Latinoamericana, Photography Collection, San Juan, Puerto Rico
- Rites. University of Puerto Rico, Recinto de Mayagüez, Puerto Rico
- 1987 - Eloquences : China and Its People, Liga de Arte, San Juan, Puerto Rico
- 1986 - Eloquences : China and Its People, Galeria Oller, University of Puerto Rico, San Juan, Puerto Rico

=== Awards ===
- Angel Ramos Foundation Award, Prize of acquisition, Museo de Arte Contemporáneo de Puerto Rico
- Best Book Award of the year “The Realm of Waiting”, Puerto Rico Art Critics Association
- Scholarship for Graduate Studies from New York University and New York State for Study abroad in India, China and Japan
- Fellowship from Seton Hall University, New Jersey, United States

=== Collections ===
- Artium Center, Museo Vasco de Arte Contemporáneo, Victoria Gasteiz, Spain
- Museum of Art Fort Lauderdale (MOAFL), Fort Lauderdale, Florida, United States
- Museum of Fine Arts Houston, Texas, United States
- Museo de Arte Latinoamericano de Buenos Aires (MALBA), Argentina
- Museo de Arte Contemporáneo de Puerto Rico, San Juan, Puerto Rico
- The Smithsonian Institution, OAS Art Museum, Washington D.C., United States
- Centro Wifredo Lam, Havana, Cuba
- Casa Las Américas, Havana, Cuba
- Lehigh Photography Collection, Lehigh, Pennsylvania, United States
- ARTIS, Paris, France
- El Museo del Barrio, New York, United States
- Museum of Art of Puerto Rico, San Juan, Puerto Rico
- Museum of Latin American Art (MoLAA), Los Angeles, United States
- Museo de Historia, Antropología y Arte, University of Puerto Rico, Río Piedras, Puerto Rico
- Point of Contact Gallery at Syracuse University, United States
- Fundacion América, Santiago, Chile
- Polytechnic University of Valencia, Valencia, Spain
- Museo de Arte de Ponce, Ponce, Puerto Rico
- Bibliothèque nationale de France, Paris, France
