= 2015–16 Hannover 96 season =

Hannover 96
2015–16 season
- Chairman: Martin Kind
- Manager: Michael Frontzeck (resigned 21 December 2015); Thomas Schaaf (appointed 28 December 2015; sacked 3 April 2016); Daniel Stendel (appointed 3 April 2016)
- Stadium: HDI-Arena, Hanover
- Bundesliga: 18th (relegated)
- DFB-Pokal: Second round
- Top goalscorer: League: Artur Sobiech (7); All: Artur Sobiech (8)
| Home colours | Away colours | Third colours |
- All statistics correct as of 15 April 2016.

The 2015–16 Hannover 96 season is the 120th season in the club's football history. In 2015–16 the club plays in the Bundesliga, the premier tier of German football. It is the club's 14th consecutive season in this league after the promotion from the 2. Fußball-Bundesliga in 2002.

The season saw Hannover relegated to the 2. Bundesliga, the first time they will play outside of the Bundesliga since 2002.

== Squad ==
As of 7 April 2016
Note: Flags indicate national team as defined under FIFA eligibility rules; some limited exceptions apply. Players may hold more than one non-FIFA nationality.

| No. | Pos. | Nation | Player |
|---|---|---|---|
| 1 | GK | GER | Ron-Robert Zieler (vice-captain) |
| 2 | MF | DEN | Leon Andreasen (vice-captain) |
| 3 | DF | CHI | Miiko Albornoz |
| 4 | DF | JPN | Hiroki Sakai |
| 5 | DF | SEN | Salif Sané |
| 6 | MF | TUR | Ceyhun Gülselam |
| 7 | MF | GER | Edgar Prib |
| 8 | MF | GER | Manuel Schmiedebach |
| 9 | FW | POL | Artur Sobiech |
| 10 | MF | JPN | Hiroshi Kiyotake |
| 11 | MF | GER | Felix Klaus |
| 13 | GK | GER | Philipp Tschauner |
| 14 | MF | FRA | Allan Saint-Maximin (on loan from Monaco) |
| 15 | MF | GER | André Hoffmann |
| 16 | MF | JPN | Hotaru Yamaguchi |
| 17 | FW | DEN | Uffe Bech |
| 18 | MF | NOR | Iver Fossum |

| No. | Pos. | Nation | Player |
|---|---|---|---|
| 19 | DF | GER | Christian Schulz (captain) |
| 20 | DF | BRA | Felipe |
| 21 | FW | GER | Marius Wolf |
| 22 | FW | POR | Hugo Almeida |
| 24 | DF | SWE | Alexander Milošević (on loan from Beşiktaş) |
| 26 | FW | TUR | Kenan Karaman |
| 27 | DF | GER | Vladimir Ranković |
| 28 | FW | HUN | Ádám Szalai (on loan from TSG Hoffenheim) |
| 29 | DF | GER | Oliver Sorg |
| 30 | GK | AUT | Samuel Radlinger |
| 31 | DF | GER | Waldemar Anton |
| 34 | MF | GER | Tim Dierßen |
| 35 | FW | NED | Charlison Benschop |
| 37 | FW | GER | Noah Sarenren Bazee |
| 38 | FW | KOS | Valmir Sulejmani |
| 40 | GK | GER | Timo Königsmann |

=== Players out on loan ===
Note: Flags indicate national team as defined under FIFA eligibility rules; some limited exceptions apply. Players may hold more than one non-FIFA nationality.

| No. | Pos. | Nation | Player |
|---|---|---|---|
| 23 | MF | GER | Maurice Hirsch (to SpVgg Greuther Fürth) |
| 25 | DF | BRA | Marcelo (to Beşiktaş) |
| 33 | MF | GER | Mike-Steven Bähre (to Hallescher FC) |
| 37 | DF | GER | Niklas Teichgräber (to VfV Borussia 06 Hildesheim) |
| 39 | FW | TUR | Mevlüt Erdinç (to Guingamp) |

=== Transfers ===
==== Transferred in ====
| No. | Pos. | Name | Age | Nat | Moving from | Type | Transfer Window | Contract ends | Transfer fee | Sources |
|---|---|---|---|---|---|---|---|---|---|---|
| 11 | Midfielder | Felix Klaus | 25 | (Germany) | SC Freiburg | Transfer | Summer | 30 June 2019 | €3.0 million | |
| 13 | Goalkeeper | Philipp Tschauner | 29 | (Germany) | St. Pauli | End of contract | Summer | 30 June 2017 | Free | |
| 14 | Midfielder | Allan Saint-Maximin | 18 | (France) | AS Monaco | Loan | Summer | 30 June 2016 | — | |
| 17 | Striker | Uffe Bech | 22 | (Denmark) | Nordsjælland | Transfer | Summer | 30 June 2019 | €2.0 million | |
| 27 | Defender | Vladimir Ranković | 22 | (Germany) | Erzgebirge Aue | Loan return | Summer | 30 June 2017 | — | |
| 29 | Defender | Oliver Sorg | 25 | (Germany) | SC Freiburg | Transfer | Summer | 30 June 2019 | €3.5 million | |
| 30 | Goalkeeper | Samuel Radlinger | 22 | (Austria) | 1. FC Nürnberg | Loan return | Summer | 30 June 2017 | — | |
| 35 | Striker | Charlison Benschop | 25 | (Netherlands) | Fortuna Düsseldorf | Transfer | Summer | 30 June 2018 | €1.5 million | |
| 38 | Striker | Valmir Sulejmani | 19 | (Kosovo) | Union Berlin | Loan return | Summer | 30 June 2017 | – | |
| 39 | Striker | Mevlüt Erdinç | 28 | (Turkey) | Saint-Étienne | Transfer | Summer | 30 June 2018 | €3.3 million | |
| 16 | Midfielder | Hotaru Yamaguchi | 25 | (Japan) | Cerezo Osaka | Transfer | Winter | 30 June 2019 | €1.5 million | |
| 18 | Midfielder | Iver Fossum | 19 | (Norway) | Strømsgodset | Transfer | Winter | 30 June 2020 | €2 million | |
| 21 | Striker | Marius Wolf | 20 | (Germany) | 1860 München | Transfer | Winter | 30 June 2019 | €1.5 million | |
| 22 | Striker | Hugo Almeida | 31 | (Portugal) | Anzhi Makhachkala | Transfer | Winter | 30 June 2017 | Free | |
| 24 | Defender | Alexander Milošević | 24 | (Sweden) | Beşiktaş | Loan | Winter | 30 June 2016 | – | |
| 28 | Striker | Ádám Szalai | 28 | (Hungary) | TSG Hoffenheim | Loan | Winter | 30 June 2016 | – | |

==== Transferred out ====
| No. | Pos. | Name | Age | Nat | Moving to | Type | Transfer Window | Transfer fee | Sources |
|---|---|---|---|---|---|---|---|---|---|
| 10 | Midfielder | Lars Stindl | 26 | (Germany) | Borussia Mönchengladbach | Transfer | Summer | €3.0 million | |
| 11 | Striker | Joselu | 25 | (Spain) | Stoke City | Transfer | Summer | €8.0 million | |
| 13 | Striker | Jan Schlaudraff | 31 | (Germany) | – | End of contract | Summer | – | |
| 14 | Goalkeeper | Markus Miller | 33 | (Germany) | – | End of contract | Summer | – | |
| 17 | Defender | João Pereira | 32 | (Portugal) | Sporting CP | End of contract | Summer | Free | |
| 18 | Defender | Marius Stankevičius | 34 | (Lithuania) | Córdoba | End of contract | Summer | Free | |
| 21 | Striker | Jimmy Briand | 30 | (France) | Guingamp | End of contract | Summer | Free | |
| 24 | Defender | Christian Pander | 31 | (Germany) | – | End of contract | Summer | – | |
| 31 | Striker | Didier Ya Konan | 31 | (Ivory Coast) | Fortuna Düsseldorf | End of contract | Summer | Free | |
| 32 | Midfielder | Leonardo Bittencourt | 21 | (Germany) | 1. FC Köln | Transfer | Summer | €2.5 million | |
| 33 | Defender | Yannik Schulze | 20 | (Germany) | – | End of contract | Summer | – | |
| 39 | Goalkeeper | Robert Almer | 31 | (Austria) | Austria Vienna | End of contract | Summer | Free | |
| 23 | Midfielder | Maurice Hirsch | 22 | (Germany) | Greuther Fürth | Loan | Winter | – | |
| 25 | Defender | Marcelo | 28 | (Brazil) | Beşiktaş | Loan | Winter | – | |
| 33 | Defender | Mike-Steven Bähre | 20 | (Germany) | Hallescher FC | Loan | Winter | – | |
| 36 | Midfielder | Sebastian Ernst | 20 | (Germany) | Magdeburg | Transfer | Winter | Undisclosed | |
| 37 | Defender | Niklas Teichgräber | 19 | (Germany) | VfV 06 Hildesheim | Loan | Winter | – | |
| 39 | Striker | Mevlüt Erdinç | 28 | (Turkey) | Guingamp | Loan | Winter | – | |

== Competitions ==
=== Bundesliga ===
==== League table ====
| Pos | Team | Pld | W | D | L | GF | GA | GD | Pts | Qualification or relegation |
|---|---|---|---|---|---|---|---|---|---|---|
| 14 | Darmstadt 98 | 34 | 9 | 11 | 14 | 38 | 53 | −15 | 38 | |
| 15 | 1899 Hoffenheim | 34 | 9 | 10 | 15 | 39 | 54 | −15 | 37 | |
| 16 | Eintracht Frankfurt (O) | 34 | 9 | 9 | 16 | 34 | 52 | −18 | 36 | Qualification for the relegation play-offs |
| 17 | VfB Stuttgart (R) | 34 | 9 | 6 | 19 | 50 | 75 | −25 | 33 | Relegation to 2. Bundesliga |
| 18 | Hannover 96 (R) | 34 | 7 | 4 | 23 | 31 | 62 | −31 | 25 | Relegation to 2. Bundesliga |

Source: DFB
Rules for classification: 1) Points; 2) Goal difference; 3) Goals scored; 4) Head-to-head points; 5) Head-to-head goal difference; 6) Head-to-head away goals scored; 7) Away goals scored; 8) Play-offs.
(O) Play-off winners; (R) Relegated

==== Results summary ====
| Overall | | | | | | | | Home | | | | | | Away | | | | | |
| Pld | W | D | L | GF | GA | GD | Pts | W | D | L | GF | GA | GD | W | D | L | GF | GA | GD |
|---|---|---|---|---|---|---|---|---|---|---|---|---|---|---|---|---|---|---|---|
| 34 | 7 | 4 | 23 | 31 | 62 | −31 | 25 | 4 | 0 | 13 | 15 | 30 | −15 | 3 | 4 | 10 | 16 | 32 | −16 |

Last updated: 14 May 2016.
Source: Bundesliga

==== Results by round ====
| Round | 1 | 2 | 3 | 4 | 5 | 6 | 7 | 8 | 9 | 10 | 11 | 12 | 13 | 14 | 15 | 16 | 17 | 18 | 19 | 20 | 21 | 22 | 23 | 24 | 25 | 26 | 27 | 28 | 29 | 30 | 31 | 32 | 33 | 34 |
|---|---|---|---|---|---|---|---|---|---|---|---|---|---|---|---|---|---|---|---|---|---|---|---|---|---|---|---|---|---|---|---|---|---|---|
| Ground | A | H | A | H | A | H | A | H | A | H | A | H | A | H | A | A | H | H | A | H | A | H | A | H | A | H | A | H | A | H | A | H | H | A |
| Result | D | L | L | L | L | L | D | W | W | L | W | L | L | W | L | L | L | L | L | L | L | L | W | L | L | L | L | L | D | W | D | L | W | L |
| Position | 9 | 12 | 16 | 16 | 16 | 18 | 18 | 17 | 14 | 15 | 14 | 15 | 15 | 14 | 14 | 16 | 17 | 18 | 18 | 18 | 18 | 18 | 18 | 18 | 18 | 18 | 18 | 18 | 18 | 18 | 18 | 18 | 18 | 18 |

Updated to match(es) played on 14 May 2016. Source: Bundesliga
A = Away; H = Home; W = Win; D = Draw; L = Loss

==== Matches ====
| 15 August 2015 1 | Darmstadt 98 | 2–2 | Hannover 96 | Darmstadt |
| 15:30 CEST (UTC+02:00) | Heller 31', 54'; Sulu (yellow card) 58' | Report | Marcelo (yellow card) 34'; Benschop 48'; Sulu 62' (o.g.); Sobiech (yellow card) 79' | Stadium: Merck-Stadion am Böllenfalltor; Attendance: 17,000; Referee: Felix Brych |

| 22 August 2015 2 | Hannover 96 | 0–1 | Bayer Leverkusen | Hanover |
| 15:30 CEST (UTC+02:00) | | Report | Çalhanoğlu 18' | Stadium: HDI-Arena; Attendance: 39,100; Referee: Wolfgang Stark |

| 29 August 2015 3 | Mainz 05 | 3–0 | Hannover 96 | Mainz |
| 15:30 CEST (UTC+02:00) | Muto 15', 29'; Mallı 47' | Report | Prib (yellow card) 67'; Sorg (yellow card) 85' | Stadium: Coface Arena; Attendance: 26,872; Referee: Peter Sippel |

| 12 September 2015 4 | Hannover 96 | 2–4 | Borussia Dortmund | Hanover |
| 15:30 CEST (UTC+02:00) | Sobiech 18', 53'; Felipe (yellow card) 84'; Zieler (yellow card) 85'; Sané (yellow card) 90+2' | Report | Aubameyang 35' (pen.), 85' (pen.); Mkhitaryan 44'; Hummels (yellow card) 56'; Felipe 67' (o.g.) | Stadium: HDI-Arena; Attendance: 49,000; Referee: Daniel Siebert |

| 20 September 2015 5 | FC Augsburg | 2–0 | Hannover 96 | Augsburg |
| 17:30 CEST (UTC+02:00) | Esswein 29'; Verhaegh 32' (pen.), (yellow card) 34' | Report | Sorg (yellow card) 23'; Marcelo (yellow card) 31'; Schulz (yellow card) 71'; Andreasen (yellow card) 89' | Stadium: WWK ARENA; Attendance: 28,511; Referee: Christian Dingert |

| 23 September 2015 6 | Hannover 96 | 1–3 | VfB Stuttgart | Hanover |
| 20:00 CEST (UTC+02:00) | Karaman 14'; Schulz (yellow card) 58'; Saint-Maximin (yellow card) 79'; Sobiech (yellow card) 81' | Report | Gentner 16'; Werner 18'; Didavi (yellow card) 38'; Die (yellow card) 45+1'; Rupp (yellow card) 88'; Maxim 90' | Stadium: HDI-Arena; Attendance: 36,800; Referee: Sascha Stegemann |

| 26 September 2015 7 | VfL Wolfsburg | 1–1 | Hannover 96 | Wolfsburg |
| 15:30 CEST (UTC+02:00) | Guilavogui (yellow card) 26'; Dost 40'; Arnold (yellow card) 69' | Report | Kiyotake 57'; Felipe (yellow card) 83'; Marcelo (yellow card) 90+3' | Stadium: Volkswagen Arena; Attendance: 29,236; Referee: Deniz Aytekin |

| 3 October 2015 8 | Hannover 96 | 1–0 | Werder Bremen | Hanover |
| 15:30 CEST (UTC+02:00) | Sané (yellow card) 19', (goal) 55'; Schulz (yellow card) 51'; Gülselam (yellow card) 89'; Zieler (yellow card) 90+2' | Report | Bartels (yellow card) 36' | Stadium: HDI-Arena; Attendance: 49,000; Referee: Peter Sippel |

| 18 October 2015 9 | 1. FC Köln | 0–1 | Hannover 96 | Cologne |
| 15:30 CEST (UTC+02:00) | Sørensen (yellow card) 21'; Osako (yellow card) 49'; Risse (yellow card) 81' | Report | Schmiedebach (yellow card) 23'; Andreasen 38'; Sané (yellow card) 67' | Stadium: RheinEnergieSTADION; Attendance: 48,700; Referee: Bastian Dankert |

| 24 October 2015 10 | Hannover 96 | 1–2 | Eintracht Frankfurt | Hanover |
| 15:30 CEST (UTC+02:00) | Klaus 51'; Sané (yellow card) 53' | Report | Reinartz (yellow card) 28'; Russ (yellow card) 35'; Stendera 57', 65'; Seferovic (yellow card) 68'; Zambrano (yellow card) 73' | Stadium: HDI-Arena; Attendance: 44,200; Referee: Felix Zwayer |

| 1 November 2015 11 | Hamburger SV | 1–2 | Hannover 96 | Hamburg |
| 17:30 CET (UTC+01:00) | Gregoritsch 6' | Report | Kiyotake 59' (pen.); Sané 67' | Stadium: Volksparkstadion; Attendance: 54,607; Referee: Sascha Stegemann |

| 6 November 2015 12 | Hannover 96 | 1–3 | Hertha BSC | Hanover |
| 20:30 CET (UTC+01:00) | Sobiech (yellow card) 5'; Andreasen (yellow card) 59'; Kiyotake 70' (pen.) | Report | Darida (yellow card) 28'; Kalou 33', 60', 87' (pen.); Plattenhardt (yellow card) 70'; Skjelbred (yellow card) 77' | Stadium: HDI-Arena; Attendance: 40,200; Referee: Christian Dingert |

| 21 November 2015 13 | Borussia Mönchengladbach | 2–1 | Hannover 96 | Mönchengladbach |
| 15:30 CET (UTC+01:00) | Traoré 34'; Wendt (yellow card) 57'; Raffael 84' | Report | Sorg (yellow card) 62'; Sobiech 65' | Stadium: Stadion im Borussia-Park; Attendance: 52,214; Referee: Felix Brych |

| 28 November 2015 14 | Hannover 96 | 4–0 | FC Ingolstadt | Hanover |
| 15:30 CET (UTC+01:00) | Marcelo 5'; Andreasen 11', (yellow card) 15'; Karaman 24'; Schulz (yellow card) 50'; Gülselam (yellow card) 79'; Bech 85' | Report | Levels (yellow card) 50'; Matip (yellow card) 56' da Costa (yellow card) 60' | Stadium: HDI-Arena; Attendance: 35,000; Referee: Tobias Stieler |

| 4 December 2015 15 | Schalke 04 | 3–1 | Hannover 96 | Gelsenkirchen |
| 20:30 CET (UTC+01:00) | Riether (yellow card) 9'; Geis 51' (pen.); Huntelaar 73'; Di Santo 82' | Report | Marcelo (yellow card) 51'; Saint-Maximin 81' | Stadium: Veltins-Arena; Attendance: 61,229; Referee: Wolfgang Stark |

| 12 December 2015 16 | TSG Hoffenheim | 1–0 | Hannover 96 | Sinsheim |
| 15:30 CET (UTC+01:00) | Schär (yellow card) 19'; Schmid 30' | Report | Gülselam (yellow card) 38'; Albornoz (yellow card) 72'; Andreasen (yellow card) 82' | Stadium: Wirsol Rhein-Neckar-Arena; Attendance: 25,531; Referee: Jochen Drees |

| 19 December 2015 17 | Hannover 96 | 0–1 | Bayern Munich | Hanover |
| 15:30 CET (UTC+01:00) | | Report | Müller 40' (pen.) | Stadium: HDI-Arena; Attendance: 49,000; Referee: Manuel Gräfe |

| 23 January 2016 18 | Hannover 96 | 1–2 | Darmstadt 98 | Hanover |
| 15:30 CET (UTC+01:00) | Almeida 10'; Sané (yellow card) 44'; Schulz (yellow card) 81' | Report | Niemeyer (yellow card) 22'; Wagner (yellow card) 25', (goal) 31', 47'; Gondorf (yellow card) 42'; Rausch (yellow card) 77'; Garics (yellow card) 84' | Stadium: HDI-Arena; Attendance: 35,600; Referee: Deniz Aytekin |

| 30 January 2016 19 | Bayer Leverkusen | 3–0 | Hannover 96 | Leverkusen |
| 15:30 CET (UTC+01:00) | Kießling 44'; Hernández 63' (pen.), 87' | Report | Gülselam (yellow card) 25'; Sakai (yellow card) 62'; Hoffmann (yellow card) 65' | Stadium: BayArena; Attendance: 28,790; Referee: Tobias Welz |

| 6 February 2016 20 | Hannover 96 | 0–1 | Mainz 05 | Hanover |
| 15:30 CET (UTC+01:00) | Milošević (yellow card) 81' | Report | Bell (yellow card) 2'; Jairo 24'; Muto (yellow card) 58' | Stadium: HDI-Arena; Attendance: 35,596; Referee: Robert Hartmann |

| 13 February 2016 21 | Borussia Dortmund | 1–0 | Hannover 96 | Dortmund |
| 15:30 CET (UTC+01:00) | Mkhitaryan 57'; Kagawa (yellow card) 69' | Report | Prib (yellow card) 36' | Stadium: Signal Iduna Park; Attendance: 80,900; Referee: Günter Perl |

| 21 February 2016 22 | Hannover 96 | 0–1 | FC Augsburg | Hanover |
| 17:30 CET (UTC+01:00) | Gülselam (yellow card) 48'; Sané (yellow card) 50' | Report | Koo 14'; Kohr (yellow card) 85'; Werner (yellow card) 89' | Stadium: HDI-Arena; Attendance: 32,400; Referee: Daniel Siebert |

| 27 February 2016 23 | VfB Stuttgart | 1–2 | Hannover 96 | Stuttgart |
| 15:30 CET (UTC+01:00) | Werner 18'; Niedermeier (yellow card) 54' | Report | Schulz 32', 83'; Hoffmann (yellow card) 56'; Yamaguchi (yellow card) 65'; Sorg (yellow card) 72' | Stadium: Mercedes-Benz Arena; Attendance: 54,356; Referee: Sascha Stegemann |

| 1 March 2016 24 | Hannover 96 | 0–4 | VfL Wolfsburg | Hanover |
| 20:00 CET (UTC+01:00) | Wolf (yellow card) 42'; Schulz (yellow card) 56' | Report | Luiz Gustavo (yellow card) 24'; Schürrle 36', 59', 62'; Draxler 69' | Stadium: HDI-Arena; Attendance: 34,500; Referee: Bastian Dankert |

| 5 March 2016 25 | Werder Bremen | 4–1 | Hannover 96 | Bremen |
| 15:30 CET (UTC+01:00) | Bartels 18'; Pizarro 26'; Gebre Selassie 56'; Junuzović 67', (yellow card) 85'; Fritz (yellow card) 69' | Report | Karaman (yellow card) 38', (goal) 45'; Gülselam (yellow card) 40' | Stadium: Weserstadion; Attendance: 42,100; Referee: Felix Zwayer |

| 12 March 2016 26 | Hannover 96 | 0–2 | 1. FC Köln | Hanover |
| 15:30 CET (UTC+01:00) | Schmiedebach (yellow card) 69' | Report | Bittencourt 43', 61'; Sørensen (yellow card) 49' | Stadium: HDI-Arena; Attendance: 40,600; Referee: Peter Sippel |

| 19 March 2016 27 | Eintracht Frankfurt | 1–0 | Hannover 96 | Frankfurt |
| 18:30 CET (UTC+01:00) | Ben-Hatira 33'; Seferovic (yellow card) 87' | Report | Zieler (yellow card) 77'; Gülselam (yellow card) 81'; Almeida (yellow card) 90+3' | Stadium: Commerzbank-Arena; Attendance: 43,300; Referee: Wolfgang Stark |

| 2 April 2016 28 | Hannover 96 | 0–3 | Hamburger SV | Hanover |
| 15:30 CEST (UTC+02:00) | Szalai (yellow card) 58' | Report | Cléber 61'; Iličević (yellow card) 68', (goal) 73'; N. Müller 75' | Stadium: HDI-Arena; Attendance: 49,000; Referee: Robert Hartmann |

| 8 April 2016 29 | Hertha BSC | 2–2 | Hannover 96 | Berlin |
| 20:30 CEST (UTC+02:00) | Ibišević 4'; Kalou (yellow card) 40', (goal) 72'; Weiser (yellow card) 57'; Langkamp (yellow card) 66' | Report | Sobiech 18'; Bech (yellow card) 26'; Sarenren Bazee (yellow card) 53'; Schmiedebach 58', (yellow card) 75'; Gülselam (yellow card) 82' | Stadium: Olympiastadion; Attendance: 45,229; Referee: Benjamin Brand |

| 15 April 2016 30 | Hannover 96 | 2–0 | Borussia Mönchengladbach | Hanover |
| 20:30 CEST (UTC+02:00) | Sané (yellow card) 45+1'; Anton 49'; Schmiedebach (yellow card) 56'; Sobiech 60' | Report | | Stadium: HDI-Arena; Attendance: 46,196; Referee: Markus Schmidt |

| 23 April 2016 31 | FC Ingolstadt | 2–2 | Hannover 96 | Ingolstadt |
| 15:30 CEST (UTC+02:00) | Hübner (yellow card) 3'; Morales 10'; Brégerie (red card) 20'; Hartmann 25', (yellow card) 55' | Report | Anton (yellow card) 32'; Szalai (yellow card) 47'; Sakai 58'; Kiyotake 82' | Stadium: Audi Sportpark; Attendance: 14,831; Referee: Sascha Stegemann |

| 30 April 2016 32 | Hannover 96 | 1–3 | Schalke 04 | Hanover |
| 15:30 CEST (UTC+02:00) | Sobiech 21' | Report | Choupo-Moting 11'; Huntelaar 45'; Schöpf 80' | Stadium: HDI-Arena; Attendance: 46,900; Referee: Günter Perl |

| 7 May 2016 33 | Hannover 96 | 1–0 | TSG Hoffenheim | Hanover |
| 15:30 CEST (UTC+02:00) | Sané (yellow card) 26'; Kiyotake 28'; Anton (yellow card) 54'; Prib (yellow card) 82' | Report | Polanski (yellow card) 10'; Volland (yellow card) 41' | Stadium: HDI-Arena; Attendance: 38,096; Referee: Wolfgang Stark |

| 14 May 2016 34 | Bayern Munich | 3–1 | Hannover 96 | Munich |
| 15:30 CEST (UTC+02:00) | Lewandowski 12'; Götze 28', 54' | Report | Klaus (yellow card) 56'; Sobiech 66' | Stadium: Allianz Arena; Attendance: 75,000; Referee: Knut Kircher |

=== DFB-Pokal ===
| 9 August 2015 Round 1 | Hessen Kassel | 0–2 | Hannover 96 | Kassel |
| 18:30 CEST (UTC+02:00) | Schmik (yellow card) 42'; Perrey (yellow card) 53'; Beqtasi (yellow card) 81' | Report | Sané 16'; Karaman 90+2' | Stadium: Auestadion; Attendance: 18,482; Referee: Patrick Alt |

| 27 October 2015 Round 2 | Darmstadt 98 | 2–1 | Hannover 96 | Darmstadt |
| 20:30 CET (UTC+01:00) | Caldirola (yellow card) 30'; Sulu 74'; Wagner 79' | Report | Andreasen (yellow card) 51'; Sobiech 75'; Albornoz (yellow card) 86'; Sané (yellow card) 90' | Stadium: Merck-Stadion am Böllenfalltor; Attendance: 15,900; Referee: Daniel Siebert |

== Statistics ==
=== Goalscorers ===
| Rank | No. | Pos | Nat | Name | Bundesliga | DFB-Pokal | Total |
|---|---|---|---|---|---|---|---|
| 1 | 9 | FW | (Poland) | Artur Sobiech | 7 | 1 | 8 |
| 2 | 10 | MF | (Japan) | Hiroshi Kiyotake | 5 | 0 | 5 |
| 3 | 26 | FW | (Turkey) | Kenan Karaman | 3 | 1 | 4 |
| 4 | 5 | MF | (Senegal) | Salif Sané | 2 | 1 | 3 |
| 5 | 2 | MF | (Denmark) | Leon Andreasen | 2 | 0 | 2 |
| 5 | 19 | DF | (Germany) | Christian Schulz | 2 | 0 | 2 |
| 7 | 4 | DF | (Japan) | Hiroki Sakai | 1 | 0 | 1 |
| 7 | 8 | MF | (Germany) | Manuel Schmiedebach | 1 | 0 | 1 |
| 7 | 11 | MF | (Germany) | Felix Klaus | 1 | 0 | 1 |
| 7 | 14 | MF | (France) | Allan Saint-Maximin | 1 | 0 | 1 |
| 7 | 17 | MF | (Denmark) | Uffe Bech | 1 | 0 | 1 |
| 7 | 22 | FW | (Portugal) | Hugo Almeida | 1 | 0 | 1 |
| 7 | 25 | DF | (Brazil) | Marcelo | 1 | 0 | 1 |
| 7 | 31 | DF | (Germany) | Waldemar Anton | 1 | 0 | 1 |
| 7 | 35 | FW | (Netherlands) | Charlison Benschop | 1 | 0 | 1 |
| Own goal | | | | | 1 | 0 | 1 |
| Totals | | | | | 31 | 3 | 34 |

Last updated: 14 May 2016

=== Clean sheets ===
| Rank | No. | Pos | Nat | Name | Bundesliga | DFB-Pokal | Total |
|---|---|---|---|---|---|---|---|
| 1 | 1 | GK | (Germany) | Ron-Robert Zieler | 5 | 1 | 6 |
| Totals | | | | | 5 | 1 | 6 |

Last updated: 14 May 2016

=== Disciplinary record ===
| No. | Pos | Nat | Player | Bundesliga | | | DFB-Pokal | | | Total | | |
| No. | Pos | Nat | Player | Yellow card | (yellow card) (yellow-red card) | Red card | Yellow card | (yellow card) (yellow-red card) | Red card | Yellow card | (yellow card) (yellow-red card) | Red card |
| 1 | GK | (Germany) | Ron-Robert Zieler | 3 | 0 | 0 | 0 | 0 | 0 | 3 | 0 | 0 |
| 2 | MF | (Denmark) | Leon Andreasen | 4 | 0 | 0 | 1 | 0 | 0 | 5 | 0 | 0 |
| 3 | DF | (Chile) | Miiko Albornoz | 1 | 0 | 0 | 1 | 0 | 0 | 2 | 0 | 0 |
| 4 | DF | (Japan) | Hiroki Sakai | 1 | 0 | 0 | 0 | 0 | 0 | 1 | 0 | 0 |
| 5 | MF | (Senegal) | Salif Sané | 8 | 0 | 0 | 1 | 0 | 0 | 9 | 0 | 0 |
| 6 | MF | (Turkey) | Ceyhun Gülselam | 8 | 0 | 0 | 0 | 0 | 0 | 8 | 0 | 0 |
| 7 | MF | (Germany) | Edgar Prib | 3 | 0 | 0 | 0 | 0 | 0 | 3 | 0 | 0 |
| 8 | MF | (Germany) | Manuel Schmiedebach | 4 | 0 | 0 | 0 | 0 | 0 | 4 | 0 | 0 |
| 9 | FW | (Poland) | Artur Sobiech | 3 | 0 | 0 | 0 | 0 | 0 | 3 | 0 | 0 |
| 11 | MF | (Germany) | Felix Klaus | 1 | 0 | 0 | 0 | 0 | 0 | 1 | 0 | 0 |
| 14 | MF | (France) | Allan Saint-Maximin | 1 | 0 | 0 | 0 | 0 | 0 | 1 | 0 | 0 |
| 15 | MF | (Germany) | Andre Hoffmann | 2 | 0 | 0 | 0 | 0 | 0 | 2 | 0 | 0 |
| 16 | MF | (Japan) | Hotaru Yamaguchi | 1 | 0 | 0 | 0 | 0 | 0 | 1 | 0 | 0 |
| 17 | FW | (Denmark) | Uffe Bech | 1 | 0 | 0 | 0 | 0 | 0 | 1 | 0 | 0 |
| 19 | DF | (Germany) | Christian Schulz | 6 | 0 | 0 | 0 | 0 | 0 | 6 | 0 | 0 |
| 20 | DF | (Brazil) | Felipe | 2 | 0 | 0 | 0 | 0 | 0 | 2 | 0 | 0 |
| 21 | FW | (Germany) | Marius Wolf | 1 | 0 | 0 | 0 | 0 | 0 | 1 | 0 | 0 |
| 22 | FW | (Portugal) | Hugo Almeida | 1 | 0 | 0 | 0 | 0 | 0 | 1 | 0 | 0 |
| 24 | DF | (Sweden) | Alexander Milošević | 1 | 0 | 0 | 0 | 0 | 0 | 1 | 0 | 0 |
| 25 | DF | (Brazil) | Marcelo | 4 | 0 | 0 | 0 | 0 | 0 | 4 | 0 | 0 |
| 26 | FW | (Turkey) | Kenan Karaman | 1 | 0 | 0 | 0 | 0 | 0 | 1 | 0 | 0 |
| 28 | FW | (Hungary) | Ádám Szalai | 2 | 0 | 0 | 0 | 0 | 0 | 2 | 0 | 0 |
| 29 | DF | (Germany) | Oliver Sorg | 4 | 0 | 0 | 0 | 0 | 0 | 4 | 0 | 0 |
| 31 | DF | (Germany) | Waldemar Anton | 2 | 0 | 0 | 0 | 0 | 0 | 2 | 0 | 0 |
| 37 | FW | (Germany) | Noah Sarenren Bazee | 1 | 0 | 0 | 0 | 0 | 0 | 1 | 0 | 0 |
| Totals | | | | 66 | 0 | 0 | 3 | 0 | 0 | 69 | 0 | 0 |

Last updated: 14 May 2016
