= 2014–15 Hannover 96 season =

Hannover 96
2014–15 season
- Chairman: Martin Kind
- Manager: Tayfun Korkut
- Stadium: HDI-Arena, Hannover
- Bundesliga: 13th
- DFB-Pokal: Second round
- Top goalscorer: League: Lars Stindl (10 goals); All: Lars Stindl (11 goals)
Home colours	Away colours	Third colours

The 2014–15 Hannover 96 season is the 119th season in the club's football history. In 2014–15 the club plays in the Bundesliga, the premier tier of German football. It is the club's 12th season in this league, having been promoted from the 2. Fußball-Bundesliga in 2002.

== Squad ==
As of 1 September 2014

Note: Flags indicate national team as defined under FIFA eligibility rules; some limited exceptions apply. Players may hold more than one non-FIFA nationality.

No.	Pos.	Nation	Player
1	GK	GER	Ron-Robert Zieler
2	DF	DEN	Leon Andreasen
3	DF	CHI	Miiko Albornoz
4	DF	JPN	Hiroki Sakai
5	DF	SEN	Salif Sané
6	MF	TUR	Ceyhun Gülselam
7	MF	GER	Edgar Prib
8	MF	GER	Manuel Schmiedebach
9	FW	POL	Artur Sobiech
10	MF	GER	Lars Stindl (captain)
11	FW	ESP	Joselu
13	FW	GER	Jan Schlaudraff
14	GK	GER	Markus Miller
15	MF	GER	André Hoffmann
17	DF	GER	Stefan Thesker
18	DF	LTU	Marius Stankevičius

No.	Pos.	Nation	Player
19	DF	GER	Christian Schulz
20	DF	BRA	Felipe
21	FW	FRA	Jimmy Briand
24	DF	GER	Christian Pander
25	DF	BRA	Marcelo
26	FW	TUR	Kenan Karaman
27	DF	GER	Vladimir Ranković
28	MF	JPN	Hiroshi Kiyotake
30	DF	GER	Florian Ballas
32	MF	GER	Leonardo Bittencourt
33	DF	GER	Yannik Schulze
34	MF	GER	Tim Dierßen
36	MF	GER	Sebastian Ernst
37	MF	GER	Niklas Teichgräber
38	FW	KOS	Valmir Sulejmani
39	GK	AUT	Robert Almer

=== Players out on loan ===
Note: Flags indicate national team as defined under FIFA eligibility rules; some limited exceptions apply. Players may hold more than one non-FIFA nationality.

No.	Pos.	Nation	Player
—	MF	BRA	França (at Figueirense)
—	MF	SUI	Adrian Nikçi (at Young Boys)

== Transfers ==
=== In ===
Note: Flags indicate national team as defined under FIFA eligibility rules; some limited exceptions apply. Players may hold more than one non-FIFA nationality.

No.	Pos.	Nation	Player
3	DF	CHI	Miiko Albornoz (from (Sweden) Malmö)
6	MF	TUR	Ceyhun Gülselam (from (Turkey) Galatasaray)
11	FW	ESP	Joselu (from (Germany) Hoffenheim)
17	DF	GER	Stefan Thesker (from (Germany) Hoffenheim)
18	DF	LTU	Marius Stankevičius (from (Turkey) Gaziantepspor)
21	FW	FRA	Jimmy Briand (from (France) Lyon)
26	FW	TUR	Kenan Karaman (from (Germany) Hoffenheim)
28	MF	JPN	Hiroshi Kiyotake (from (Germany) Nürnberg)
39	GK	AUT	Robert Almer (from (Germany) Energie Cottbus)

=== Out ===
Note: Flags indicate national team as defined under FIFA eligibility rules; some limited exceptions apply. Players may hold more than one non-FIFA nationality.

No.	Pos.	Nation	Player
—	DF	BEL	Sébastien Pocognoli (at (England) West Bromwich)
—	MF	HUN	Szabolcs Huszti (at (China) Changchun Yatai)
—	DF	GER	Christopher Avevor (at (Germany) Fortuna Düsseldorf)
—	FW	SEN	Mame Biram Diouf (at (England) Stoke)
—	FW	CIV	Didier Ya Konan (at (Saudi Arabia) Al-Ittihad)

== Competitions ==
=== Bundesliga ===
==== League table ====
Pos	Team	Pld	W	D	L	GF	GA	GD	Pts
11	Mainz 05	34	9	13	12	45	47	−2	40
12	1. FC Köln	34	9	13	12	34	40	−6	40
13	Hannover 96	34	9	10	15	40	56	−16	37
14	VfB Stuttgart	34	9	9	16	42	60	−18	36
15	Hertha BSC	34	9	8	17	36	52	−16	35

Source: DFB
Rules for classification: 1) points; 2) goal difference; 3) number of goals scored

==== Results summary ====
Overall								Home						Away					
Pld	W	D	L	GF	GA	GD	Pts	W	D	L	GF	GA	GD	W	D	L	GF	GA	GD
32	7	10	15	36	54	−18	31	5	4	7	19	24	−5	2	6	8	17	30	−13

Last updated: 9 May 2015.
Source: Competitive matches

==== Results by round ====
Round	1	2	3	4	5	6	7	8	9	10	11	12	13	14	15	16	17	18	19	20	21	22	23	24	25	26	27	28	29	30	31	32	33	34
Ground	H	A	H	A	H	A	A	H	A	H	A	H	A	H	A	H	A	A	H	A	H	A	H	H	A	H	A	H	A	H	A	H	A	H
Result	W	D	W	L	W	L	L	L	W	W	W	L	L	L	D	W	D	L	D	L	L	D	D	L	L	L	D	D	L	L	D	D	W	W
Position	3	7	3	6	3	6	8	10	7	6	4	5	8	9	9	8	8	8	8	10	10	10	11	12	13	14	14	15	15	15	17	16	15	13

Updated to match(es) played on 23 May 2015. Source: Competitive matches
A = Away; H = Home; W = Win; D = Draw; L = Loss

==== Matches ====
23 August 2014 1	Hannover 96	2–1	FC Schalke 04	Hanover
15:30 CEST (UTC+02:00)	Prib 67' (yellow card) 90+2'; Joselu 70'; Andreasen (yellow card) 78'	Report	Huntelaar 47'; Ayhan (yellow card) 76'	Stadium: Niedersachsenstadion; Attendance: 49,000; Referee: Peter Gagelmann

31 August 2014 2	1. FSV Mainz 05	0–0	Hannover 96	Mainz
15:30 CEST (UTC+02:00)		Report	Schulz (yellow card) 32'	Stadium: Coface Arena; Attendance: 27,647; Referee: Sascha Stegemann

14 August 2014 3	Hannover 96	2–0	Hamburger SV	Hanover
17:30 CEST (UTC+02:00)	Andreasen 13' (yellow card) 39'; Sobiech 24'; Bittencourt (yellow card) 45+3'; Marcelo (yellow card) 69'	Report	Holtby (yellow card) 26'; Diekmeier (yellow card) 73'; Jiráček (yellow card) 89'	Stadium: Niedersachsenstadion; Attendance: 49,000; Referee: Markus Schmidt

20 September 2014 4	SC Paderborn 07	2–0	Hannover 96	Paderborn
15:30 CEST (UTC+02:00)	Kachunga 71'; Stoppelkamp 90+3' (yellow card) 90+3'	Report		Stadium: Benteler Arena; Attendance: 15,000; Referee: Knut Kircher

24 August 2014 5	Hannover 96	1–0	1. FC Köln	Hanover
20:00 CEST (UTC+02:00)	Joselu 8'	Report	Peszko (yellow card) 49'; Ujah (yellow card) 90'	Stadium: Niedersachsenstadion; Attendance: 39,400; Referee: Tobias Stieler

27 September 2014 6	VfB Stuttgart	1–0	Hannover 96	Stuttgart
15:30 CEST (UTC+02:00)	Gentner (yellow card) 57'; Schwaab 69'; Leitner (yellow card) 75'; Kostić (yellow card) 90'	Report	Gülselam (yellow card) 44'; Bittencourt (yellow card) 86'	Stadium: Mercedes-Benz Arena; Attendance: 40,500; Referee: Günter Perl

4 October 2014 7	FC Bayern Munich	4–0	Hannover 96	Munich
15:30 CEST (UTC+02:00)	Lewandowski 6', 38'; Robben 13', 79'	Report		Stadium: Allianz Arena; Attendance: 71,000; Referee: Daniel Siebert

18 October 2014 8	Hannover 96	0–3	Borussia Mönchengladbach	Hanover
15:30 CEST (UTC+02:00)	Schulz (yellow card) 65'	Report	Kruse 14' 90'; Xhaka 49'; Stranzl (yellow card) 87'	Stadium: Niedersachsenstadion; Attendance: 49,000; Referee: Kinhöfer

25 October 2014 9	Borussia Dortmund	0–1	Hannover 96	Dortmund
15:30 CEST (UTC+02:00)	Mkhitaryan (yellow card) 51'; Reus (yellow card) 80'; Gündoğan (yellow card) 80'	Report	Joselu (yellow card) 36'; Schmiedebach (yellow card) 50'; Gülselam (yellow card) 51' (yellow-red card) 89'; Kiyotake 61'; Marcelo (yellow card) 68'; Zieler (yellow card) 90+2'	Stadium: Westfalenstadion; Attendance: 80,667; Referee: Tobias Stieler

1 November 2014 10	Hannover 96	1–0	Eintracht Frankfurt	Hanover
15:30 CET (UTC+01:00)	Schulz (yellow card) 4'; Hirsch (yellow card) 46'; Madlung 88' (o.g.)	Report	Madlung (yellow card) 43'; Kinsombi (yellow card) 59'	Stadium: Niedersachsenstadion; Attendance: 42,200; Referee: Sascha Stegemann

7 November 2014 11	Hertha BSC	0–2	Hannover 96	Berlin
20:30 CET (UTC+01:00)	Stocker (yellow card) 57'; Brooks (yellow card) 66'; Ronny (yellow card) 83'	Report	Briand 44'; Bittencourt (yellow card) 45+1'; Kiyotake (yellow card) 68' (goal) 76'	Stadium: Olympiastadion; Attendance: 39,710; Referee: Peter Sippel

22 November 2014 12	Hannover 96	1–3	Bayer 04 Leverkusen	Hanover
15:30 CET (UTC+01:00)	Gülselam (yellow card) 17' (goal) 60'; Prib (yellow card) 41'; Schmiedebach (yellow card) 79'	Report	Rolfes (yellow card) 16'; Kießling 46'; Son 58'; Bellarabi 71'	Stadium: Niedersachsenstadion; Attendance: 40,800; Referee: Marco Fritz

29 November 2014 13	TSG 1899 Hoffenheim	4–3	Hannover 96	Sinsheim
18:30 CET (UTC+01:00)	Schwegler 19'; Volland 37'; Polanski 59'; Süle 63'; Bičakčić (yellow card) 75'	Report	Sakai (yellow card) 19'; Schulz (yellow card) 39'; Stindl 43', 86' (yellow card) 84'; Joselu 52' (yellow card) 90+2'	Stadium: Rhein-Neckar Arena; Attendance: 22,716; Referee: Felix Brych

6 December 2014 14	Hannover 96	1–3	VfL Wolfsburg	Hanover
15:30 CET (UTC+01:00)	Joselu 45+1'; Marcelo (yellow card) 71'; Sakai (yellow card) 90+2'	Report	De Bruyne 4' (yellow card) 84'; Dost 69'; Arnold 85'	Stadium: Niedersachsenstadion; Attendance: 41,400; Referee: Markus Schmidt

13 December 2014 15	SV Werder Bremen	3–3	Hannover 96	Bremen
15:30 CET (UTC+01:00)	Kroos (yellow card) 20'; Junuzović 36'; Lorenzen 55'; Caldirola (yellow card) 68'; Selke 88'; Bartels (yellow card) 90+2'	Report	Stindl 12'; Sakai (yellow card) 35'; Joselu 62'; Kiyotake 64'; Schmiedebach (yellow card) 65'; Gülselam (yellow card) 83'	Stadium: Weserstadion; Attendance: 40,932; Referee: Tobias Welz

16 December 2014 16	Hannover 96	2–0	FC Augsburg	Hanover
20:00 CET (UTC+01:00)	Sané 20'; Joselu 55' (pen.)	Report	Bobadilla (yellow card) 67'; Baier (yellow card) 71'; Klavan (yellow card) 88'	Stadium: Niedersachsenstadion; Attendance: 30,800; Referee: Christian Dingert

21 December 2014 17	SC Freiburg	2–2	Hannover 96	Freiburg im Breisgau
17:30 CET (UTC+01:00)	Riether (yellow card) 38'; Frantz 45'; Kempf (yellow card) 47' (goal) 81'; Klaus (yellow card) 52'	Report	Hirsch (yellow card) 37'; Bittencourt 83'; Kiyotake (yellow card) 84'; Albornoz (yellow card) 90+1'; Joselu 90+3'	Stadium: Dreisamstadion; Attendance: 23,550; Referee: Günter Perl

31 January 2015 18	FC Schalke 04	1–0	Hannover 96	Gelsenkirchen
15:30 CET (UTC+01:00)	Giefer (yellow card) 30'; Höger 32'; Huntelaar (red card) 85'; Neustädter (yellow card) 88'	Report	Bittencourt (yellow card) 31'; Albornoz (yellow card) 42'; Stindl (yellow card) 68'	Stadium: Veltins-Arena; Attendance: 61,646; Referee: Sascha Stegemann

3 February 2015 19	Hannover 96	1–1	1. FSV Mainz 05	Hanover
20:00 CET (UTC+01:00)	Briand 26'; Sané (yellow card) 52'	Report	Soto 77'; Jara (yellow card) 88'	Stadium: Niedersachsenstadion; Attendance: 30,500; Referee: Thorsten Kinhöfer

7 February 2015 20	Hamburger SV	2–1	Hannover 96	Hamburg
18:30 CET (UTC+01:00)	Marcelo 26' (o.g.); Jansen 50' (yellow card) 90'	Report	Sobiech 66'	Stadium: Volksparkstadion; Attendance: 51,779; Referee: Manuel Gräfe

15 February 2015 21	Hannover 96	1–2	SC Paderborn 07	Hanover
17:30 CET (UTC+01:00)	Schulz (yellow card) 33'; Marcelo 66'; Sané (yellow card) 78'; Pereira (yellow card) 90+2'	Report	Heinloth (yellow card) 58'; Lakić 72'; Meha 79'	Stadium: Niedersachsenstadion; Attendance: 38,300; Referee: Jochen Drees

21 February 2015 22	1. FC Köln	1–1	Hannover 96	Cologne
18:30 CET (UTC+01:00)	Ujah 17'; Vogt (yellow card) 77'; Olkowski (yellow card) 79'	Report	Joselu 5'; Gülselam (yellow card) 27'; Hirsch (yellow card) 47'; João Pereira (yellow card) 71' (yellow-red card) 90+1'; Sané (yellow card) 75'	Stadium: RheinEnergieStadion; Attendance: 47,300; Referee: Günter Perl

28 February 2015 23	Hannover 96	1–1	VfB Stuttgart	Hanover
15:30 CET (UTC+01:00)	Prib (yellow card) 30'; Stindl 70' (yellow card) 89' (yellow-red card) 90'; Joselu (yellow card) 90+1'	Report	Gentner 52'; Ginczek (yellow card) 54'; Kirschbaum (yellow card) 86'; Harnik (red card) 90'	Stadium: Niedersachsenstadion; Attendance: 40,200; Referee: Wolfgang Stark

7 March 2015 24	Hannover 96	1–3	FC Bayern Munich	Hanover
15:30 CET (UTC+01:00)	Kiyotake 25'; Bittencourt (yellow card) 77'	Report	Alonso 28' (yellow card) 39'; Müller 61' (pen.), 72'; Bernat (yellow card) 64'; Ribéry (yellow card) 82'	Stadium: Niedersachsenstadion; Attendance: 49,000; Referee: Tobias Welz

15 March 2015 25	Borussia Mönchengladbach	2–0	Hannover 96	Mönchengladbach
17:30 CET (UTC+01:00)	Herrmann 43', 75'; Stranzl (yellow card) 70'	Report		Stadium: Borussia-Park; Attendance: 49,134; Referee: Jochen Drees

21 March 2015 26	Hannover 96	2–3	Borussia Dortmund	Hanover
15:30 CET (UTC+01:00)	Stindl 31', 82'; Bittencourt (yellow card) 49' (yellow-red card) 55'; Sané (yellow card) 71'	Report	Aubameyang 19', 61'; Subotić (yellow card) 46'; Kagawa 57'	Stadium: Niedersachsenstadion; Attendance: 49,000; Referee: Felix Brych

4 April 2015 27	Eintracht Frankfurt	2–2	Hannover 96	Frankfurt
15:30 CEST (UTC+02:00)	Madlung 27'; Oczipka (yellow card) 28'; Kittel (yellow card) 44'; Aigner 54'	Report	Sakai (yellow card) 13'; Stindl (yellow card) 39'; Marcelo 68'; Ya Konan 82' (yellow card) 90+1'	Stadium: Commerzbank-Arena; Attendance: 49,600; Referee: Deniz Aytekin

10 April 2015 28	Hannover 96	1–1	Hertha BSC	Hanover
20:30 CEST (UTC+02:00)	Schulz (yellow card) 53' (goal) 75'; Sané (yellow card) 85'; Felipe (yellow card) 90'	Report	Langkamp (yellow card) 77'; Stocker 83'	Stadium: Niedersachsenstadion; Attendance: 46,000; Referee: Marco Fritz

18 April 2015 29	Bayer 04 Leverkusen	4–0	Hannover 96	Leverkusen
15:30 CEST (UTC+02:00)	Toprak 20'; Brandt 40'; Papadopoulos 49'; Kießling 70' (yellow card) 88'	Report	Gülselam (yellow card) 61'; Sakai (yellow card) 72'; Stindl (yellow card) 88'	Stadium: BayArena; Attendance: 29,482; Referee: Daniel Siebert

25 April 2015 30	Hannover 96	1–2	TSG 1899 Hoffenheim	Hanover
15:30 CEST (UTC+02:00)	Stindl 24' (pen.) (yellow card) 90+1'; Sané (yellow card) 41'; Schmiedebach (yellow card) 64'; Zieler (yellow card) 70'; Joselu (yellow card) 89'	Report	Modeste 1'; Strobl (yellow card) 23'; Bičakčić (yellow card) 41'; Schipplock 83'	Stadium: Niedersachsenstadion; Attendance: 46,200; Referee: Günter Perl

2 May 2015 31	VfL Wolfsburg	2–2	Hannover 96	Wolfsburg
15:30 CEST (UTC+02:00)	Dost 24'; Perišić 45'; Vieirinha (yellow card) 88'	Report	Briand 47'; Prib (yellow card) 56'; Sané 58'	Stadium: Volkswagen Arena; Attendance: 29,514; Referee: Felix Brych

9 May 2015 32	Hannover 96	1–1	SV Werder Bremen	Hanover
15:30 CEST (UTC+02:00)	Stindl 21' (yellow card) 89'; Marcelo (yellow card) 34'; Briand (yellow card) 55'; Sané (yellow card) 85'	Report	Vestergaard (yellow card) 65'; Junuzović 78'	Stadium: Niedersachsenstadion; Attendance: 49,000; Referee: Deniz Aytekin

16 May 2015 33	FC Augsburg	1–2	Hannover 96	Augsburg
15:30 CEST (UTC+02:00)	Verhaegh 30' (pen.) (yellow card) 34' (yellow-red card) 90'; Mölders (yellow card) 89'; Bobadilla (red card) 90+5'	Report	Stindl 24', 54' (yellow card) 53'; Sakai (yellow card) 28' (yellow-red card) 77'; Zieler (yellow card) 29'; Gülselam (yellow card) 72'; Sané (yellow card) 90+4'	Stadium: SGL arena Attendance: 29,899; Referee: Felix Zwayer

23 May 2015 34	Hannover 96	2–1	SC Freiburg	Hanover
15:30 CEST (UTC+02:00)	Kiyotake 3'; Schmiedebach (yellow card) 14'; Briand (yellow card) 67'; Schulz (yellow card) 80'; Krmaš 84' (o.g.)	Report	Mitrović (yellow card) 68'; Petersen 90+2'; Krmaš (yellow card) 90+4'	Stadium: Niedersachsenstadion; Attendance: 49,000; Referee: Wolfgang Stark

=== DFB-Pokal ===
16 August 2014 Round 1	FC Astoria Walldorf	1–3	Hannover 96	Walldorf
15:30 CEST (UTC+02:00)	Hillenbrand (yellow card) 42' (goal) 59'; Kern (yellow card) 66'	Report	Joselu 29', 79'; Marcelo (red card) 40'; Schulz (yellow card) 58'; Stindl 76'	Stadium: FC-Astoria Stadion; Attendance: 3,400; Referee: Martin Petersen

28 October 2014 Round 2	VfR Aalen	2–0	Hannover 96	Aalen
19:00 CET (UTC+01:00)	Gülselam 24' (o.g.); Klauß 59'; Drexler (yellow card) 82'	Report	Felipe (yellow card) 27'; Gülselam (yellow card) 77'; Schulz (yellow card) 86'	Stadium: Scholz-Arena; Attendance: 5,448; Referee: Wolfgang Stark

== Statistics ==
=== Goalscorers ===
Rank	No.	Pos	Nat	Name	Bundesliga	DFB-Pokal	Total
1	10	MF	(Germany)	Lars Stindl	10	1	11
2	11	FW	(Spain)	Joselu	8	2	10
3	28	MF	(Japan)	Hiroshi Kiyotake	5	0	5
4	21	FW	(France)	Jimmy Briand	3	0	3
5	5	DF	(Senegal)	Salif Sané	2	0	2
5	9	FW	(Poland)	Artur Sobiech	2	0	2
5	4	DF	(Brazil)	Marcelo	2	0	2
8	2	DF	(Denmark)	Leon Andreasen	1	0	1
8	6	MF	(Turkey)	Ceyhun Gülselam	1	0	1
8	7	MF	(Germany)	Edgar Prib	1	0	1
8	19	DF	(Germany)	Christian Schulz	1	0	1
8	30	FW	(Ivory Coast)	Didier Ya Konan	1	0	1
8	32	MF	(Germany)	Leonardo Bittencourt	1	0	1
Own goal					2	0	2
Totals					40	3	43

Last updated: 23 May 2015

=== Clean sheets ===
Rank	No.	Pos	Nat	Name	Bundesliga	DFB-Pokal	Total
1	1	GK	(Germany)	Ron-Robert Zieler	7	0	7
Totals					7	0	7

Last updated: 23 May 2015

=== Disciplinary record ===
No.	Pos	Nat	Player	Bundesliga			DFB-Pokal			Total		
No.	Pos	Nat	Player	Yellow card	(yellow card) (yellow-red card)	Red card	Yellow card	(yellow card) (yellow-red card)	Red card	Yellow card	(yellow card) (yellow-red card)	Red card
1	GK	(Germany)	Ron-Robert Zieler	3	0	0	0	0	0	3	0	0
2	DF	(Denmark)	Leon Andreasen	2	0	0	0	0	0	2	0	0
3	DF	(Chile)	Miiko Albornoz	2	0	0	0	0	0	2	0	0
4	DF	(Japan)	Hiroki Sakai	5	1	0	0	0	0	5	1	0
5	DF	(Senegal)	Salif Sané	8	0	0	0	0	0	8	0	0
6	MF	(Turkey)	Ceyhun Gülselam	6	1	0	1	0	0	7	1	0
7	MF	(Germany)	Edgar Prib	4	0	0	0	0	0	4	0	0
8	MF	(Germany)	Manuel Schmiedebach	5	0	0	0	0	0	5	0	0
10	MF	(Germany)	Lars Stindl	7	1	0	0	0	0	7	1	0
11	FW	(Spain)	Joselu	4	0	0	0	0	0	4	0	0
17	DF	(Portugal)	João Pereira	1	1	0	0	0	0	1	1	0
19	DF	(Germany)	Christian Schulz	7	0	0	2	0	0	9	0	0
20	DF	(Brazil)	Felipe	1	0	0	1	0	0	2	0	0
21	FW	(France)	Jimmy Briand	2	0	0	0	0	0	2	0	0
23	MF	(Germany)	Maurice Hirsch	3	0	0	0	0	0	3	0	0
25	DF	(Brazil)	Marcelo	4	0	0	0	0	1	4	0	1
28	MF	(Japan)	Hiroshi Kiyotake	2	0	0	0	0	0	2	0	0
30	FW	(Ivory Coast)	Didier Ya Konan	1	0	0	0	0	0	1	0	0
32	MF	(Germany)	Leonardo Bittencourt	5	1	0	0	0	0	5	1	0
Totals				72	4	0	4	0	1	76	4	1

Last updated: 23 May 2015
