= Maurice Hirsch =

Maurice Hirsch may refer to:

- Maurice de Hirsch (1831–1896), German Jewish financier and philanthropist
- Maurice Hirsch (footballer) (born 1993), German footballer
