= Marcelo (footballer, born May 1987) =

Brazilian footballer

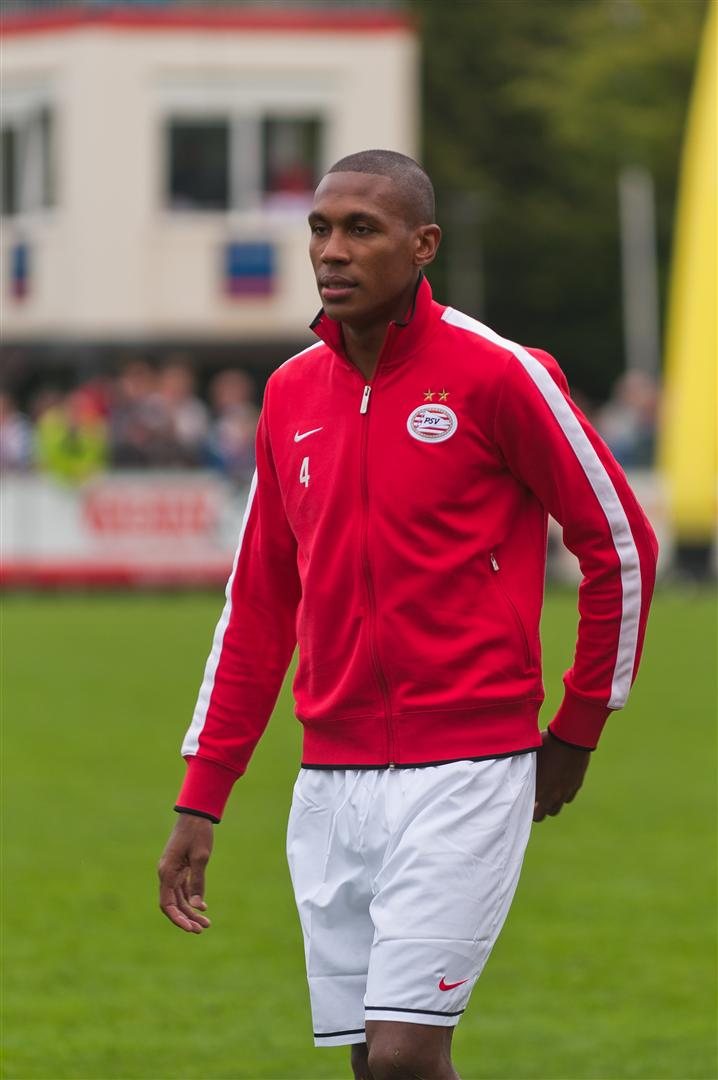
- Marcelo with PSV Eindhoven in 2011

Personal information
- Full name: Marcelo Antônio Guedes Filho
- Date of birth: 20 May 1987 (age 39)
- Place of birth: São Vicente, Brazil
- Height: 1.91 m (6 ft 3 in)
- Position: Centre-back

Youth career
- Santos

Senior career*
Years	Team	Apps	(Gls)
2007–2008	Santos	54	(3)
2008–2010	Wisła Kraków	49	(10)
2010–2013	PSV	91	(5)
2013–2016	Hannover 96	77	(3)
2016	→ Beşiktaş (loan)	14	(2)
2016–2017	Beşiktaş	32	(3)
2017–2021	Lyon	121	(6)
2021–2022	Lyon B	11	(3)
2022	Bordeaux	11	(0)
2022–2024	Western Sydney Wanderers	49	(3)

International career
2007	Brazil U20	4	(0)
- * Club domestic league appearances and goals as of 1 July 2024

Marcelo Antônio Guedes Filho (born 20 May 1987), commonly known as Marcelo, is a Brazilian professional former footballer who played as a centre-back.

== Career ==
=== Santos ===
Born in São Vicente, Marcelo began his career at Santos, making his first team debut in the 2007 season. He won the Campeonato Paulista with the club that season. He also helped his team qualify to Copa Libertadores semifinals in the 2007 season as well as to quarterfinals in the following campaign. Marcelo made 65 appearances for Santos in all competitions before his contract expired at the end of August 2008.

=== Wisła Kraków ===
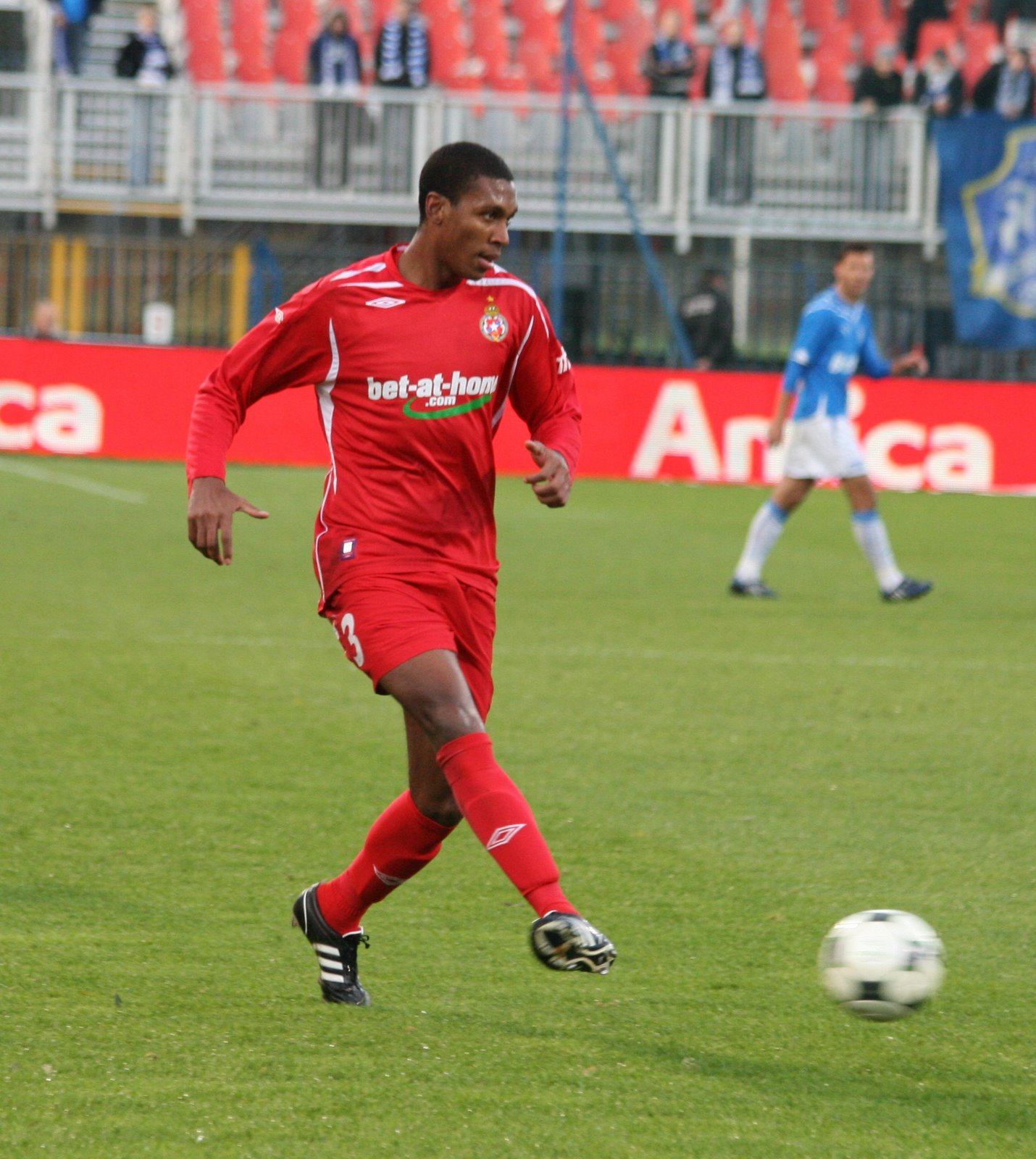
Marcelo in 2009

Marcelo subsequently signed a five-year contract with Polish Ekstraklasa champions Wisła Kraków on 1 September 2008. However, his former club Santos refused to issue his certificate stating that Marcelo has a contract with them until 2011. The court ultimately rejected these claims and Marcelo was successfully registered as a Wisła player.

Marcelo won the Ekstraklasa championship title in his debut season, contributing with 21 matches and three successful strikes. He formed a prominent partnership with Arkadiusz Głowacki in the centre of defence, both were among the three nominees for Ekstraklasa Defender of the Year award in 2009. In the 2009–10 season, Marcelo finished as the club's third top scorer with a seven goals in the league for the eventual Ekstraklasa runners up.

=== PSV ===
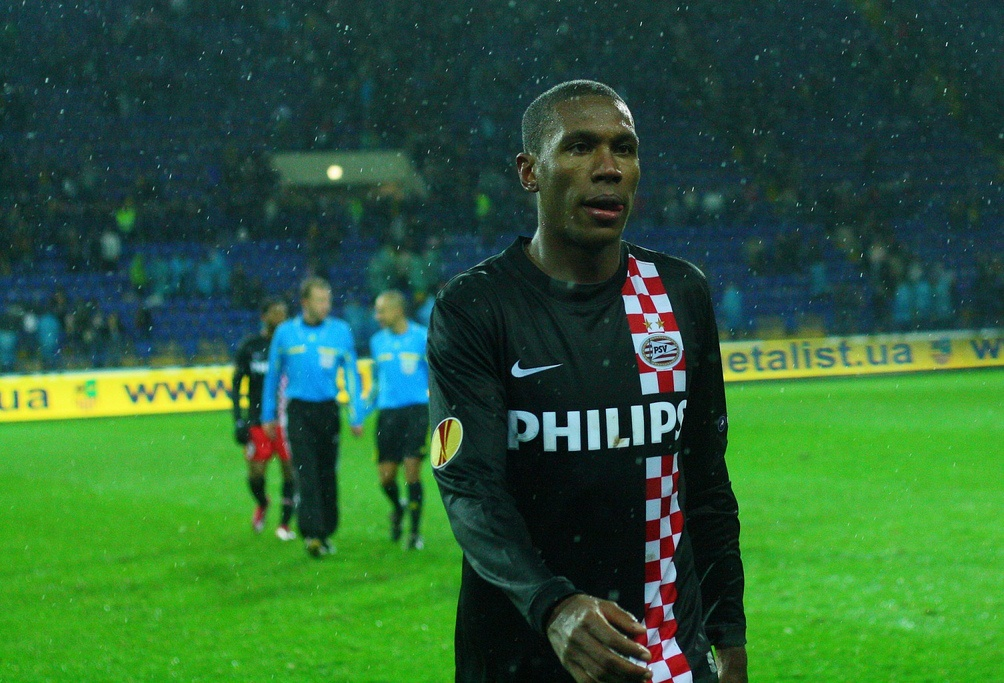
Marcelo in 2010

On 8 July 2010, Marcelo joined Eredivisie side PSV on a three-year deal for an undisclosed fee from Wisła Kraków. He immediately established himself as a regular in the team, playing in 45 matches in all competitions during his first season. In the following campaign, Marcelo won his first trophy with the Dutch outfit, beating Heracles Almelo in the KNVB Cup.

=== Hannover 96 ===
On 10 August 2013, it was announced that PSV had sold Marcelo to Hannover 96 for an undisclosed transfer fee.

==== Beşiktaş ====
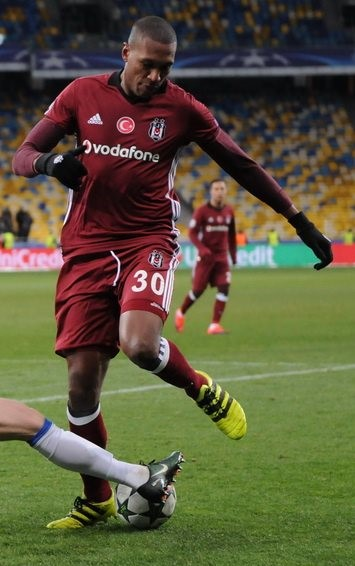
Marcelo in 2016

On 1 February 2016, Marcelo joined Turkish club Beşiktaş.

=== Lyon ===
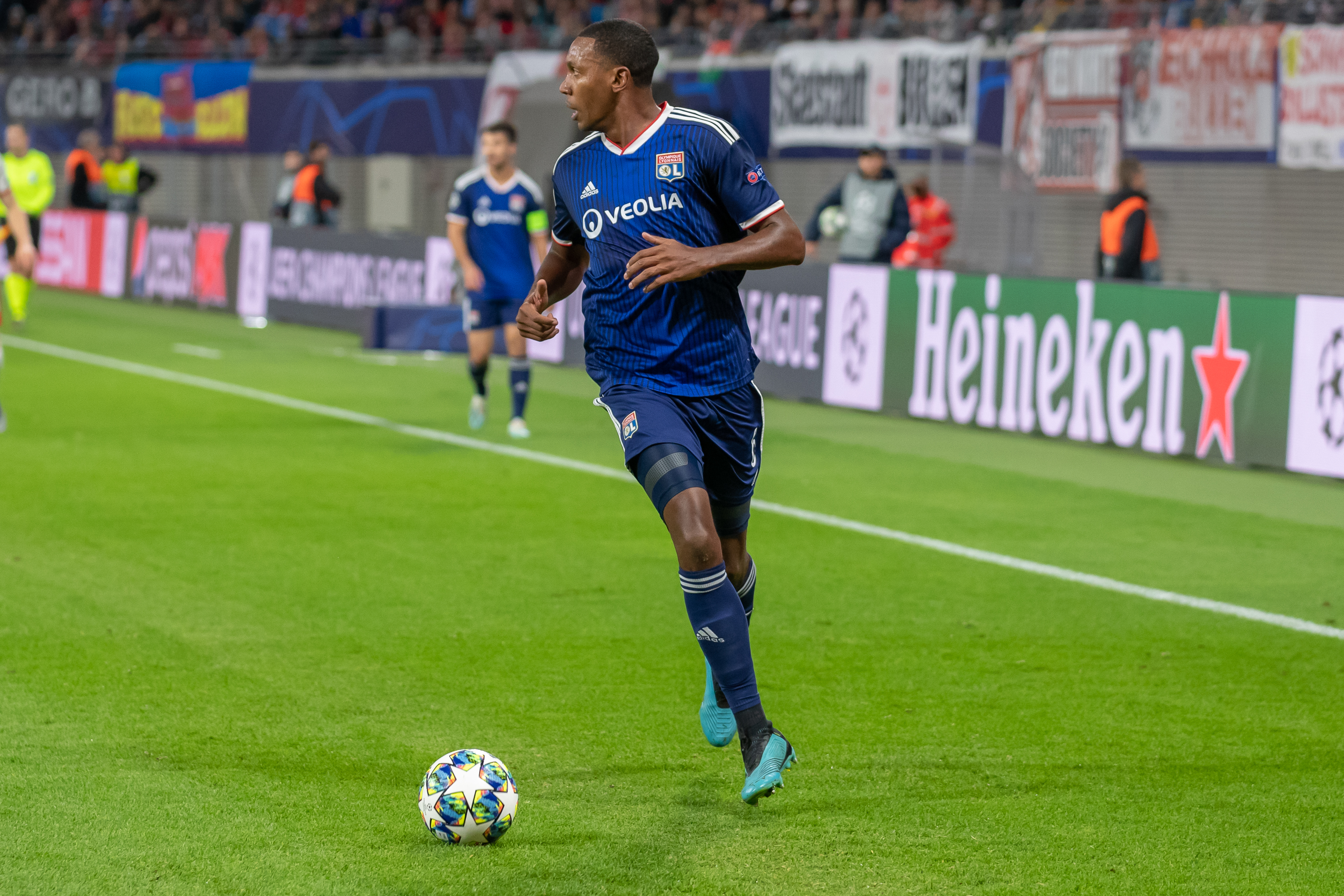
Marcelo with Lyon in 2019

On 13 July 2017, Marcelo joined Ligue 1 club Lyon. The transfer fee was an initial €7 million plus €0.5 million in bonuses.

In August 2021, Marcelo was demoted to Lyon's reserve team after inappropriate behaviour in the locker room following a 3–0 defeat to Angers, in which the player scored an own goal. On 26 January 2022, his contract at the club was terminated.

=== Bordeaux ===
On 28 January 2022, Marcelo joined French side Bordeaux on a contract until the end of the season. He was unveiled by the club's director Admar Lopes on 1 February in a press conference meeting.

Bordeaux went on to suffer relegation, and Marcelo left the club as a free agent at the end of his contract.

=== Western Sydney Wanderers ===
On 31 July 2022, Marcelo signed a one-year contract with Western Sydney Wanderers in Australia, having been interested in the club's project and overhaul of signings under Marko Rudan. He arrived in Sydney in late August, a week prior, to the club's training camp in Gold Coast where he proved to have an important impact on the team on and off the field. As a result, on 26 September, Western Sydney Wanderers announced Marcelo as their new captain for the upcoming A-League season. Marcelo made his league debut, alongside 8 other debutants, in the opening round on 9 October in a 1–0 win against Perth Glory at CommBank Stadium.

During an episode of A-Leagues All Access on 28 January 2023, Marcelo was assigned the task of marking Mariners' striker Jason Cummings, who was dealing with a rib injury during the match against Central Coast Mariners. Marcelo's assertive defensive display garnered both praise and criticism from the media; some characterised his treatment of Cummings, targeting the injured area with fouls, as "brutal" and "antagonistic." However, Marcelo did not offer an apology and instead expressed his perspective, stating, "Throughout my 20 years in football, I have never played without pain. It's a normal part of the game. Don't use it as an excuse. If you're on the field, you're open to everything. I don't care if he's injured; if he's out there, it means he's fit enough to play." The match concluded in a 2–2 draw at Central Coast Stadium. Subsequently, Marcelo experienced recurring groin injuries, causing him to miss the game against Adelaide United. However, he made a return in the following match against Macarthur FC.

In the returning match against Central Coast Mariners on 4 March, Marcelo was given a straight red after a challenge on Storm Roux just 26 minutes after Brandon Borrello opening goal. Two days later, the Wanderers issued a statement announcing that Marcelo would face a minimum one-match suspension in accordance with the A-Leagues Disciplinary Regulations for "Serious foul play." Nevertheless, Marcelo continued to receive praise for his contributions throughout the league season and was widely regarded as a key component, often referred to as the "lynchpin," within Marko Rudan's system. His statistical performance attested to this, with an average of 2.0 interceptions and 6.4 clearances per 90 minutes, and a mere 12 goals conceded while he was on the pitch. On 28 March, Marcelo extended his contract with the Western Sydney Wanderers up until the end of the 2023–24 A-League Men season.

On 31 March, in a match against Adelaide United, Marcelo was involved in an incident at stoppage time where he was sent off for putting Nestory Irankunda and Lachlan Barr into a chokehold following a challenge where Irankunda pushed teammate Calem Nieuwenhof. His actions received criticism from pundits and media as it was deemed "totally unnecessary" by analysts, however, Marko Rudan defended his actions saying, "What he does – and he’s done that from day one – when there’s a bit of a melee, he puts his hand around someone to make sure no one else gets involved. It might look aggressive but he hasn’t been pulled up on it so far this season," adding, “Maybe he shouldn’t have done what he did to young Irankunda, I think he got involved there, but I think you need to learn from that a little bit – but I don’t think it was as bad as everyone’s making it out to be." On 13 April, Marcelo received a two-match suspension and issued with a suspended sanction of a further two matches in A-League or Australia Cup matches.

On 28 April, Marcelo played his 600th game of his professional career, in a 3–2 defeat to Melbourne City in the last round of the A-League season.

== Career statistics ==
As of 27 April 2024

Appearances and goals by club, season and competition
Club	Season	League			State League		National cup		Continental		Total	
Club	Season	Division	Apps	Goals	Apps	Goals	Apps	Goals	Apps	Goals	Apps	Goals
Santos	2007	Série A	25	2	7	1	—		7	0	39	3
Santos	2008	Série A	16	0	6	0	—		4	0	26	0
Santos	Total		41	2	13	1	—		11	0	65	3
Wisła Kraków	2008–09	Ekstraklasa	21	3	—		8	0	1	0	30	3
Wisła Kraków	2009–10	Ekstraklasa	28	7	—		3	0	2	0	33	7
Wisła Kraków	Total		49	10	—		11	0	3	0	63	10
PSV Eindhoven	2010–11	Eredivisie	28	2	—		3	0	14	1	45	3
PSV Eindhoven	2011–12	Eredivisie	31	2	—		6	0	12	0	49	2
PSV Eindhoven	2012–13	Eredivisie	32	1	—		5	0	7	1	44	2
PSV Eindhoven	2013–14	Eredivisie	0	0	—		0	0	1	0	1	0
PSV Eindhoven	Total		91	5	—		14	0	34	2	139	7
Hannover 96	2013–14	Bundesliga	24	0	—		1	0	—		25	0
Hannover 96	2014–15	Bundesliga	34	2	—		1	0	—		35	2
Hannover 96	2015–16	Bundesliga	19	1	—		0	0	—		19	1
Hannover 96	Total		77	3	—		2	0	—		79	3
Beşiktaş (loan)	2015–16	Süper Lig	14	2	—		2	0	0	0	16	2
Beşiktaş	2016–17	Süper Lig	32	3	—		3	0	10	0	45	3
Lyon	2017–18	Ligue 1	35	3	—		4	1	10	1	49	5
Lyon	2018–19	Ligue 1	33	0	—		5	0	8	0	46	0
Lyon	2019–20	Ligue 1	17	0	—		6	0	10	0	33	0
Lyon	2020–21	Ligue 1	34	3	—		3	0	—		37	3
Lyon	2021–22	Ligue 1	2	0	—		0	0	0	0	2	0
Lyon	Total		121	6	—		18	1	28	1	177	8
Lyon B	2021–22	Championnat National 2	11	3	—		—		—		11	3
Bordeaux	2021–22	Ligue 1	11	0	—		—		—		11	0
Western Sydney Wanderers	2022–23	A-League Men	23	1	3	0	—		—		26	1
Western Sydney Wanderers	2023–24	A-League Men	26	2	—		—		—		26	0
Western Sydney Wanderers	Total		49	3	3	0	—		—		52	3
Career total			496	37	16	1	50	1	86	3	648	42

== Honours ==
Santos

- Campeonato Paulista: 2007

Wisła Kraków

- Ekstraklasa: 2008–09

PSV Eindhoven

- KNVB Cup: 2011–12
- Johan Cruyff Shield: 2012

Beşiktaş

- Süper Lig: 2015–16, 2016–17

Lyon

- Coupe de la Ligue runner-up: 2019–20

Individual

- Ekstraklasa Player of the Month: December 2009
- Süper Lig Team of the Season: 2016–17
- PFA A-League Team of the Season: 2022–23, 2023–24
- A-Leagues All Stars: 2024
