= Aidt =

Coordinates: 56.315°N 9.788°E

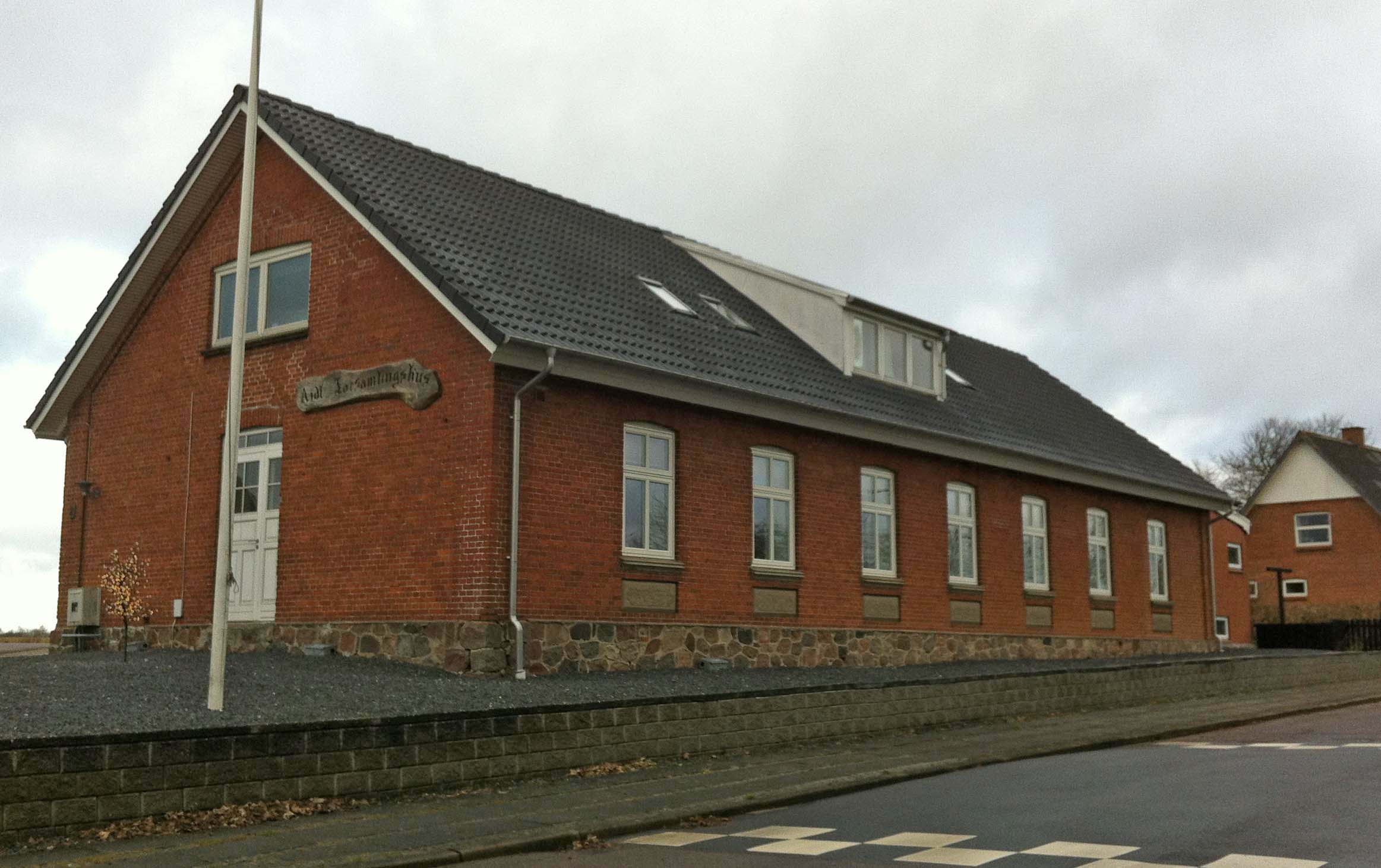
Aidt

Aidt is a town in the middle of Jutland, Denmark. Aidt Church is located there.

Aidt is also a rather rare East Frisian first name, also spelt Eid, Eidt, Aid, Ait, Eilt, and Eildt, and is found in several surnames, such "Eilts", meaning which means Eilt's son. It is also the last name of the Danish writer and poet Naja Marie Aidt.

== Notable people from Aidt ==
- Leon Andreasen (born 1983 in Aidt) a former Danish professional footballer with over 250 club caps
