= Hiroki Sakai =

Japanese footballer (born 1990)

Hiroki Sakai 酒井 宏樹
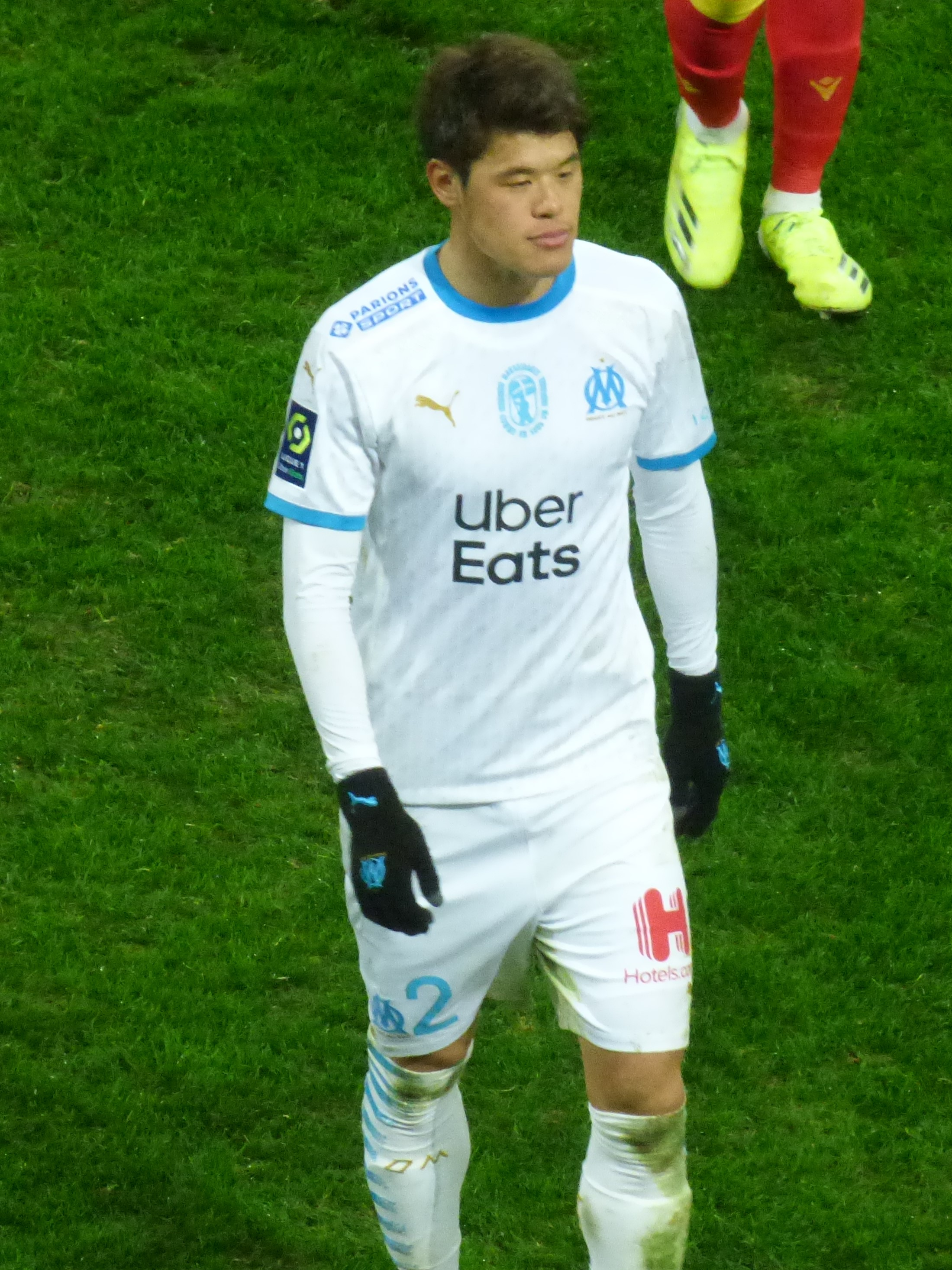
- Sakai With Marseille in 2021

Personal information
- Full name: Hiroki Sakai
- Date of birth: 12 April 1990 (age 36)
- Place of birth: Kashiwa, Japan
- Height: 1.83 m (6 ft 0 in)
- Position: Right-back

Team information
- Current team: Auckland FC
- Number: 2

Youth career
- 2003–2009: Kashiwa Reysol
- 2009: → Mogi Mirim (loan)

Senior career*
Years	Team	Apps	(Gls)
2009–2012	Kashiwa Reysol	51	(2)
2012–2016	Hannover 96	92	(2)
2016–2021	Marseille	145	(1)
2021–2024	Urawa Red Diamonds	69	(5)
2024–	Auckland FC	47	(3)

International career^{‡}
2011–2012	Japan U23	21	(2)
2021	Japan Olympic (O.P.)	5	(1)
2012–2022	Japan	74	(1)
Medal record
Representing Japan
AFC Asian Cup
Silver medal – second place	2019 United Arab Emirates
- * Club domestic league appearances and goals as of 24 May 2026 ‡ National team caps and goals as of 5 December 2022 (UTC)

Hiroki Sakai (酒井 宏樹, Sakai Hiroki; pronounced [sakai̯ hiɾoki]; born 12 April 1990) is a Japanese professional footballer who plays as a right back and the inaugural captain for A-League club Auckland FC.

== Club career ==
=== Kashiwa Reysol ===
Born on 12 April 1990, in Kashiwa, Chiba, Japan, Sakai was introduced to football by his two older brothers and joined a school football team when he was in the third grade of elementary school. Sakai initially played as a striker before converting to a full back, where he has played since. Sakai spent 10 years with the school football team before joining Kashiwa Reysol U15 side in 2003.

Sakai progressed through the ranks of the Kashiwa Reysol and learned his guidance under Tatsuma Yoshida. Eventually, he worked his way through to the U16 and U18 side despite suffering injuries along the way. During his progress, Sakai joined Mogi Mirim to study abroad on a short–term, though he said the experience benefited him to improve his right–back and centre–back positions. Sakai eventually returned to Japan in November 2009.

Ahead of the 2010 season, Sakai was promoted to Kashiwa Reysol's first team, where he signed a contract with the club and was given the number 30 shirt. At the start of the 2010 season, Sakai started out on the substitute bench in number of matches. It wasn't until on 5 May 2010 when he made his Kashiwa Reysol debut, coming on as a substitute for Yohei Kurakawa in the 77th minute, in a 1–1 draw against Ventforet Kofu. Sakai then made his first start for the side on 25 July 2010, starting the whole game and set up one of the goals, in a 2–2 draw against JEF United Chiba. It wasn't until on 31 October 2010 when he scored his first goal for the club, in a 4–1 win over Mito HollyHock. Sakai later helped Kashiwa Reysol secure promotion to J. League Division 1. Although he was featured several times later in the season, Sakai went on to make 12 appearances and scoring once for the side.

Ahead of the 2011 season, the club announced that Sakai were among players to agree to stay at Kashiwa Reysol and was given a number 4 shirt. However, he missed the start of the season, due to a metatarsal fracture injury, causing to miss six matches. It wasn't until on 23 April 2011 when Sakai made his first appearance of the season, in a 1–0 win over Omiya Ardija. He then quickly established himself in the starting eleven, playing in the right–back position. On 12 May 2011, it was announced that Sakai signed another contract with the club. He began to set up goals in number of matches for the side, including twice against Kawasaki Frontale on 16 July 2011. Sakai later helped Kashiwa Reysol win the league and lifted the trophy after beating Urawa Red Diamonds 3–2 in the last game of the season. As a result, the club qualified for the FIFA Club World Cup as part of winning the league. He played his first match of the tournament, starting the whole game, in the play-off for the quarter–finals, in a 2–0 win over Auckland City. Sakai then scored in the semi–final, in a 3–1 loss against Santos. He played four times in the tournament, as Kashiwa Reysol finished fourth place in the FIFA Club World Cup. At the end of the 2011 season, he was awarded J. League Rookie of the Year and was named in the J. League Best XI. Despite being sidelined on several occasions later in the season, Sakai made 35 appearances and scoring once in all competitions.

At the start of the 2012 season, Sakai started the season well when he helped Kashiwa Reysol win the Japanese Super Cup by beating FC Tokyo 2–1 on 3 March 2012. Three days after winning the Japanese Super Cup, he scored his first goal of the season in the AFC Champions League, in a 3–2 loss against Buriram United. Sakai scored and set up the club's third goal of the game, in a 3–3 draw against Yokohama F. Marinos in the opening game of the season. His third goal of the season then came on 17 April 2012, in a 3–1 loss against Guangzhou Evergrande Taobao in the AFC Champions League. A month later, on 17 May 2012, he set up two goals, in a 2–1 win over Cerezo Osaka. His performance attracted interests from clubs in Europe, mostly Germany, as the season progressed. With his move to Hannover 96 reached an agreement, Sakai made his last appearance for the club, which came on 30 June 2012, in a 6–2 win over Gamba Osaka. After his departure, he was given a farewell sendoff following an end of Kashiwa Reysol's match. Despite missing out one match by the time of his departure, Sakai continued to regain his first team place for the side this season, playing in the right–back position and went on to make 23 appearances and scoring 3 times in all competitions this season.

=== Hannover 96 ===
It was announced on 13 June 2012 that Hannover 96 agreed to sign Sakai from Kashiwa Reysol. It was later confirmed with he signed a four–year contract with the club, keeping him until 2016. The transfer reportedly cost 1 million euro (100 million yen).

However, at the start of the 2012–13 season, Sakai missed several matches, due to international commitment with Japan and his own injury concerns. It wasn't until on 31 August 2012 when he made his Hannover 96 debut in the Qualification Round Second Leg of the UEFA League Europa League and set up one of the goals, in a 5–1 win over Śląsk Wrocław. Sakai then made his league debut on 23 September 2012, where he came on as a substitute from 16 minutes to the end of the game, in a 3–1 loss against 1899 Hoffenheim. However, his first team opportunities with the club became limited and was on the substitute bench as a result. As the season progressed, Sakai began to receive more playing time for the last four matches. In his first season at Hannover 96, Sakai made 17 appearances in all competitions for the side.

Ahead of the 2013–14 season, Sakai was expected to compete in the right–back position with Steve Cherundolo once again. After Cherundolo injured his knee at the start of the season, he began to play in number of matches since the start of the season, playing in the right–back position. Sakai then scored his first goal for the club, in a 3–2 loss against Werder Bremen on 3 November 2013. In a follow–up match against local rivals’ Eintracht Braunschweig on 8 November 2013, he started and played the whole game to keep a clean sheet, in a 0–0 draw. However, Sakai soon lost his first team place around early–2014 and was placed on the substitute bench for several matches. He later returned to the starting lineup on 1 March 2014, in a 1–1 draw against FC Augsburg and regained his first team place for the rest of the season. However, Sakai missed the remaining two league matches of the 2013–14 season when he suffered a knee injury, having previously suffered a same injury earlier in April. In his second season at Hannover 96, Sakai went on to make 28 appearances and scoring once in all competitions.

At the start of the 2014–15 season, Sakai became Hannover 96's first choice right–back following the retirement of Cherundolo. Along the way, he faced his own injury concern in the first half of the season. By February, however, Sakai lost his first team place to new signing, João Pereira. Over the next months as the season progressed, both he and Pereira fought over the right–back position. However, Sakai had discipline issues when he was suspended on two occasions, including one when he was sent–off bookable offence, in a 2–1 win over FC Augsburg on 16 May 2015. Despite suffering from injuries during the season, Sakai made twenty–nine appearances in all competitions.

Ahead of the 2015–16 season, Sakai was linked with a move away from Hannover 96, as clubs like Napoli and other clubs among interested. Eventually, he stayed at the club throughout the summer transfer window. At the start of the season, Sakai continued to regain his first team place in the right–back position. This lasted until mid-September when he suffered a strain on his thigh and missed out two matches. It wasn't until on 18 October 2015 when Sakai returned from injury, coming on as a second–half substitute, in a 1–0 win over 1. FC Köln. Sakai was then sidelined again between late–November and early–December when he suffered injuries for the second time this season. Since returning from injuries, Sakai regained back his first team place in the right–back position. He then scored his first goal of the season on 23 April 2016, in a 2–2 draw against FC Ingolstadt 04. However, the draw resulted the club being relegated to 2. Bundesliga after a 14-year stay in Bundesliga. Shortly after, Sakai missed the rest of the season with a muscle injury. At the end of the 2015–16 season, he went on to make 28 appearances and scoring once in all competitions.

Following Hannover 96's relegation, Sakai expressed his desire to leave the club.

=== Marseille ===
After Hannover 96's relegation, Sakai moved to Ligue 1 side Marseille on a free transfer on 23 June 2016. It was revealed that his then national team manager Vahid Halilhodžić convinced him to join Olympique de Marseille. In addition, he became the second Japanese player to join Olympique de Marseille since Kōji Nakata. Upon joining the club, Sakai was given a number two shirt ahead of the new season.

Sakai made his Olympique de Marseille debut in the opening game of the season, where he set up a goal for Florian Thauvin, in a 4–0 win over Toulouse. Sakai quickly established himself in the starting eleven for the side, playing in the right–back position. This was due to the fact that he was the only player to play in the right–back position. At one point, Sakai played in the right–midfield position once during a 0–0 draw against rivals against Paris Saint-Germain on 23 October 2016. However, he suffered a muscle injury and was substituted in the 65th minute, in a 2–1 win against Clermont Foot on 26 October 2016. After missing one match, Sakai returned from injury, coming on as a second–half substitute, in a 3–1 loss against Montpellier HSC on 4 November 2016. As the 2016–17 season progressed, he continued to have discipline issues that saw him suspended on two separate occasions. In his first season at Olympique de Marseille, Sakai made make 40 appearances in all competitions. Reflecting on his performances, his teammate Florian Thauvin and Manager Rudi Garcia both praised his commitment and performance when the club were in a financial problems during the season.

At the start of the 2017–18 season, Sakai continued to establish himself in the starting eleven as a right–back despite facing competition from with Bouna Sarr over the position. Sakai stated in an interview with France Football that he has settled in France, having suffered difficulties in his previous season. His performance in a 2–0 win over Toulouse on 24 September 2017 led him to be named Team of the Week. Following good performance for the side this season so far, Sakai signed a four–year contract with the club, keeping him until 2021, on 29 September 2017. Having played in the right–back position in the first half of the season, he switched to playing in the left–back position following the departure of Patrice Evra and injury of Jordan Amavi. Sakai spent the next six matches, playing in the left–back position before returning to his original position. During a 3–2 loss against Lyon on 18 March 2018, he suffered an injury in the first–half and was substituted as a result, leading him to be sidelined between 7–10 days. Sakai made his return from injury on 5 April 2018 in the first leg of the UEFA Europa League quarter–final, in a 1–0 loss to RB Leipzig. On 12 April 2018, he scored his first UEFA Europa League goal on his 28th birthday in the quarter–final return leg, in a 5–2 win over RB Leipzig to progress into the next round and a 5–3 aggregate victory. Nine days later after the win, however, Sakai sustained an injury during a 5–1 win over Lille and was substituted in the first half as a result; which he was sidelined for three weeks. Despite recovering from his injury in mid–May, he, however, was featured on the substitute bench throughout 90 minutes, as Marseille lost 3–0 to Atlético Madrid in the UEFA Europa League Final. At the end of the 2017–18 season, Sakai finished the season, making 50 appearances and scoring twice in all competitions.

At the start of the 2018–19 season, Sakai continued to remain in the first team as Marseille's first choice right–back. By September, he set up two goals in the league, including one, which turned out to be a winning goal against RC Strasbourg. Sakai made his 100th appearance for the club, starting a match, in a 3–1 loss against Lazio in the UEFA Europa League match on 25 October 2018. Despite suffering two separate injuries by the end of the year, he switched into playing both left–back and centre–back positions. After spending a month with Japan in the AFC Asian Cup, Sakai made his first appearance for the club, starting a match, in a 1–0 win against Girondins de Bordeaux on 5 February 2019. Since returning to the first team, he regained his first team place in the right–back position. At times, Sakai rotated in playing either the left–back and right–midfield positions. He then scored his first goal of the season, scoring from a header, in a 5–1 win against Toulouse on 18 May 2019. Despite missing one more match due to suspension, Sakai went on to make 32 appearances and scoring once in all competitions. At the end of the 2018–19 season, he was named Olympique de Marseille Player of the Season.

Ahead of the 2019–20 season, Sakai was linked with a move to Premier League side Tottenham Hotspur, but he ended up staying at the club. Sakai started in the first four league matches of the 2019–20 season, playing in the right–back position. On 29 August 2019, he signed a contract extension with Marseille, keeping him until 2022. However, Sakai suffered a calf injury that saw him out for two matches. He made his return to the starting line–up against Dijon FCO on his 100th league appearance, in a 0–0 draw on 24 September 2019. Sakai then played three consecutive times in the left–back position between 4 October 2019 and 27 October 2019. Following this, he resumed playing in the right–back position once again. During a 2–0 win against Angers SCO on 3 December 2019, Sakai suffered a shoulder injury and was taken off at half–time. But he was able to make a full recovery and made his return to the starting line–up, in a 3–1 win against Bordeaux on 8 December 2019. However, Sakai found himself suspended on two occasions, including one when he received a second bookable offence, in a victory against Trélissac on penalties following a 1–1 draw in the third round of Coupe de France. Sakai suffered a further setback when he suffered an adductor injury that saw him out for two matches. It wasn't until on 6 March 2020 when he made his return from injury, coming on as a 77th-minute substitute, in a 2–2 draw against Amiens. This turned out to be the last match of the season, due to the COVID-19 pandemic, which caused the season to end abruptly. At the end of the 2019–20 season, Sakai made 25 appearances in all competitions. Following this, he underwent a surgery on his ankle.

The start of the 2020–21 season saw Sakai retain his first team place, playing in the right–back position. During a match against Paris Saint-Germain on 13 September 2020, he was caught in the centre of attention after Spanish radio station Cadena SER claimed to have footage of Neymar racially abusing him. In response to the attention, Sakai denied any racist comments from Neymar on social media. He set up the opening goal of the game for Florian Thauvin, in a 3–1 win against Bordeaux on 17 October 2020. Since the start of the 2020–21 season, Sakai started in every match until he missed one match, due to suspension. Sakai made his return to the starting line–up against FC Nantes on 28 November 2020 and helped the club win 3–1. Following his return from suspension, he regained his first team place, playing in the right–back position. However in mid–February, Sakai suffered a stomach problem that saw him out for one match. He made his return from an illness, starting a match, in a 3–2 win against OGC Nice on 17 February 2021. However, his return was short–lived when Sakai received a straight red card at the last minute for a foul on Kader Bamba, as Marseille drew 1–1 against FC Nantes in a follow–up. After serving a two match suspension, he returned as a substitute, in a 3–1 win against Stade Brestois on 13 March 2021. Despite suffering sciatica problems on three separate occasions later in the 2020–21 season, Sakai made two starts, playing either centre–back position, winning both matches. He made his last appearance for the club, starting in the left–back position, in a 3–2 win against Angers OSC on 16 May 2021. At the end of the 2020–21 season, Sakai made 29 appearances in all competitions.

On 24 May 2021, Sakai announced that he was leaving the club despite having a year contract left. During his time at Marseille, Sakai was a fan favourite among the club's supporters. He considered himself to be "a proud Marseillais".

=== Urawa Red Diamonds ===
On 10 June 2021, Sakai made his return to Japan, signing for Urawa Red Diamonds in the J1 League.

He made his debut for the club, starting the match, in a 2–1 win against Sagan Tosu on 14 August 2021. Sakai helped Urawa Red Diamonds keep five consecutive clean sheets in the league between 21 August 2021 and 25 September 2021. He scored his first goal for the club, in a 2–1 win against FC Tokyo on 25 September 2021. His second goal for Urawa Red Diamonds, in a 1–1 draw against Kawasaki Frontale on 3 November 2021. Sakai then started in Emperor's Cup final against Oita Trinita and helped the club win 2–1 to win the tournament. At the end of the 2021 season, Sakai made 18 appearances and scoring 2 times in all competitions.

In the Japanese Super Cup against Kawasaki Frontale, Sakai set up a goal for Ataru Esaka, who went on to score twice, in a 2–0 win. However during a match against Júbilo Iwata on 19 March 2022, he suffered a foot injury and was substituted in the 53rd minute, resulting in him out for three weeks. On 10 April 2022, Sakai made his return from injury, starting a match, against FC Tokyo and helped Urawa Red Diamonds keep a clean sheet, in a 0–0 draw. In a follow–up match, he captained the club for the first time, and set up one of the goals, in a 4–1 win against Lion City Sailors. However, Sakai's return was short–lived when he suffered a foot injury once again and was out for two months. It wasn't until on 26 June 2022 when Sakai made his return from injury, coming on as a second–half substitute, in a 1–0 win against Vissel Kobe. However during a 3–1 win against Kawasaki Frontale on 30 July 2022, he suffered a knee injury and was substituted in the 61st minute. Two weeks later on 10 August 2022, Sakai returned to the starting line–up from injury as captain, in a 3–0 win against Nagoya Grampus in the second leg of the J.League Cup quarter–finals. In the AFC Champions League semi–finals against Jeonbuk Hyundai Motors, he set up the opening goal of the game and started the whole game all the way to penalty–shootout in a 2–2 draw, as Urawa Red Diamonds won on penalties to help the club reach the final. However, his return was short–lived when Sakai suffered a calf injury that saw him out for two matches. On 14 September 2022, he made his return from injury, coming on as a second–half substitute, in a 1–0 loss against Cerezo Osaka. Following this, Sakai started in the next five matches until he missed the last game of the season, due to suspension. At the end of the 2022 season, Sakai made 28 appearances in all competitions.

Ahead of the 2023 season, Sakai was appointed as the new captain of Urawa Red Diamonds. He started in the first seven league matches of the season and led the club on winning their first four consecutive wins in the league for in over six years. Along the way, Sakai scored his first goal of the season, in a 2–1 win over Albirex Niigata on 18 March 2023. However during a match against Nagoya Grampus on 9 April 2023, he suffered an injury and was substituted in the 68th minute. But Sakai was able from injury when he led Urawa Red Diamonds secured a dramatic victory in the 2022 AFC Champions League final. Sakai led Urawa Red Diamonds' captain to beat the defending champions Al Hilal 2–1 on aggregate, making it their third win in the competition. This victory marked the club's third AFC Champions League title, solidifying their position as a powerhouse in Asian club football. For his performance, he was named AFC Champions League's Most Valuable Player. Following his return from injury, Sakai regained his first team place, as well as, his captaincy. He then scored his second goal of the season, in a 2–1 win against Sanfrecce Hiroshima on 31 May 2023. In the first leg of the J.League semi–final against Yokohama F. Marinos, Sakai received a red card for a second bookable offence, in a 1–0 loss. After serving a one match, he returned to the starting line–up as captain for the J.League Cup final against Avispa Fukuoka, but was unable to help Urawa Red Diamonds win the final after losing 2–1. Shortly after, Sakai suffered a meniscus injury on his right knee that expect him to be out for the rest of the season. But he made his return from injury, coming on as an 81st-minute substitute, in a 2–1 win against Club León in the second round of the FIFA Club World Cup. Sakai returned to the starting line–up as captain in third place play–offs, in a 4–2 loss against Al Ahly SC. At the end of the 2023 season, he went on to make 37 appearances and scoring 2 times in all competitions.

Ahead of the 2024 season, Urawa Red Diamonds announced that Sakai would retain his captaincy. He scored his first goal of the season, in a 1–0 win against Hokkaido Consadole Sapporo on 10 March 2024. Sakai then set up two goals in two matches between 30 March 2024 and 3 April 2024. However during a 2–1 loss against FC Tokyo on 3 April 2024, he suffered a knee injury that saw him out for a month. A month later on 15 May 2024, Sakai made his return from injury, coming on as a late substitute, in a 3–0 win against Kyoto Sanga. After announcing his departure, he and teammate Alexander Scholz were given a farewell sendoff following the club's matches against Júbilo Iwata on 30 June 2024.

=== Auckland FC ===
On 11 June 2024, it was reported by Andy Harper that Sakai had agreed to join Auckland FC ahead of their inaugural A-League Men season. Amid the transfer speculation, it was announced on 24 June 2024 by Urawa Red Diamonds that he had left the club.

On 24 July 2024, Sakai's transfer to Auckland FC was officially confirmed. On 15 October, Sakai was named club captain for the inaugural season, with Jake Brimmer and Tommy Smith appointed as vice-captains.

On 19 October 2024, Sakai made his competitive debut for Auckland FC in the club’s first-ever match, a 2–0 win over Brisbane Roar. He set up the club’s first goal by slicing a cross that was turned into an own goal by Harry Van Der Saag. On 28 December 2024, Sakai scored his first goal for the club in a 4–1 win over the Central Coast Mariners. On 17 February 2025, it was announced that Sakai had extended his contract with Auckland FC until the end of the 2025–26 season. Sakai captained Auckland to their first piece of silverware, winning the Premiers Plate at the end of the regular season. Sakai also featured in both semi-final legs against Melbourne Victory, where Auckland lost 2–1 on aggregate. Sakai ended his debut A-League season with 3 goals, and 4 assists in 25 appearances, earning him a place in the Professional Footballers Australia (PFA) A-League Team of the Season, alongside teammates Louis Verstraete, Francis de Vries, and Alex Paulsen.

Sakai captained Auckland FC in their first Australia Cup campaign during pre-season, assisting Jesse Randall after 30 seconds in the club's cup debut, a 4–0 win over Gold Coast Knights. Sakai also started in Auckland's opening match of the 2025–26 season, a 0–0 draw away to Melbourne Victory at AAMI Park. During the season, Sakai was sidelined by a recurring hamstring injury. He was substituted early in a 2–1 win over Adelaide United on 1 November, but returned four weeks later in early December. He was sidelined again for a further four weeks after suffering another hamstring injury in a 3–0 win over Melbourne City, before returning in early April. Shortly after returning from injury, the club announced that Sakai had signed a contract extension until the end of the 2026–27 season.

Sakai started and captained all four of Auckland FC's finals matches during the club's A-League Men finals series. This included playing the full 120 minutes in a 1–1 draw with Melbourne City in the elimination final, where he successfully converted his penalty in the shootout as Auckland progressed 7–6 on penalties. Following a 4–1 aggregate semi-final victory over Adelaide United, Auckland advanced to their first A-League Men Grand Final. Sakai again played the full 90 minutes in a 1–0 win over Sydney FC, captaining Auckland FC to the A-League Men Championship and becoming the first New Zealand club to win the title. The championship was also the second piece of silverware won in the club's first two years of existence.

== International career ==
=== Youth and Olympics career ===
After spending three years between 2008 and 2011, representing Japan's youth system, Sakai was called up by Japan U23 squad for the first time in May 2011. On 1 June 2011, he made his Japan U23 on the same day, in a 3–1 win over Australia U23. Three weeks later on 23 June 2011, Sakai scored his first goal for the U23 side, in second leg of the Asian Qualifiers Preliminary Round of the Summer Olympics, in a 2–1 loss against Kuwait U23, but Japan U23 won 4–3 on aggregate. After making his U23 debut, he became a regular for the U23 throughout the year in the right–back position. On 22 February 2012, Sakai scored again and set up one of the goals, in a 4–0 win over Malaysia U23.

On 2 July 2012, Sakai was called up for the 2012 Summer Olympics Football tournament in London. He started in a match, playing 74 minutes before being substituted, in a 1–0 win over Spain U23. Sakai went on to start three more matches in the tournament, as Japan U23 reached the semi–finals and finished fourth place.

Sakai was named as one of Japan's three over-age players for the Olympic on home soil, alongside Maya Yoshida and Wataru Endo. On 22 July 2021, he made his first appearance for the U23 side, starting a match, in a 3–0 win against South Africa. Sakai scored his first goal of the tournament, in a 4–0 win against France. After serving a one match suspension, he returned to the starting line–up, losing both matches in the semi–finals and bronze medal match against Spain and Mexico respectively.

=== Senior ===
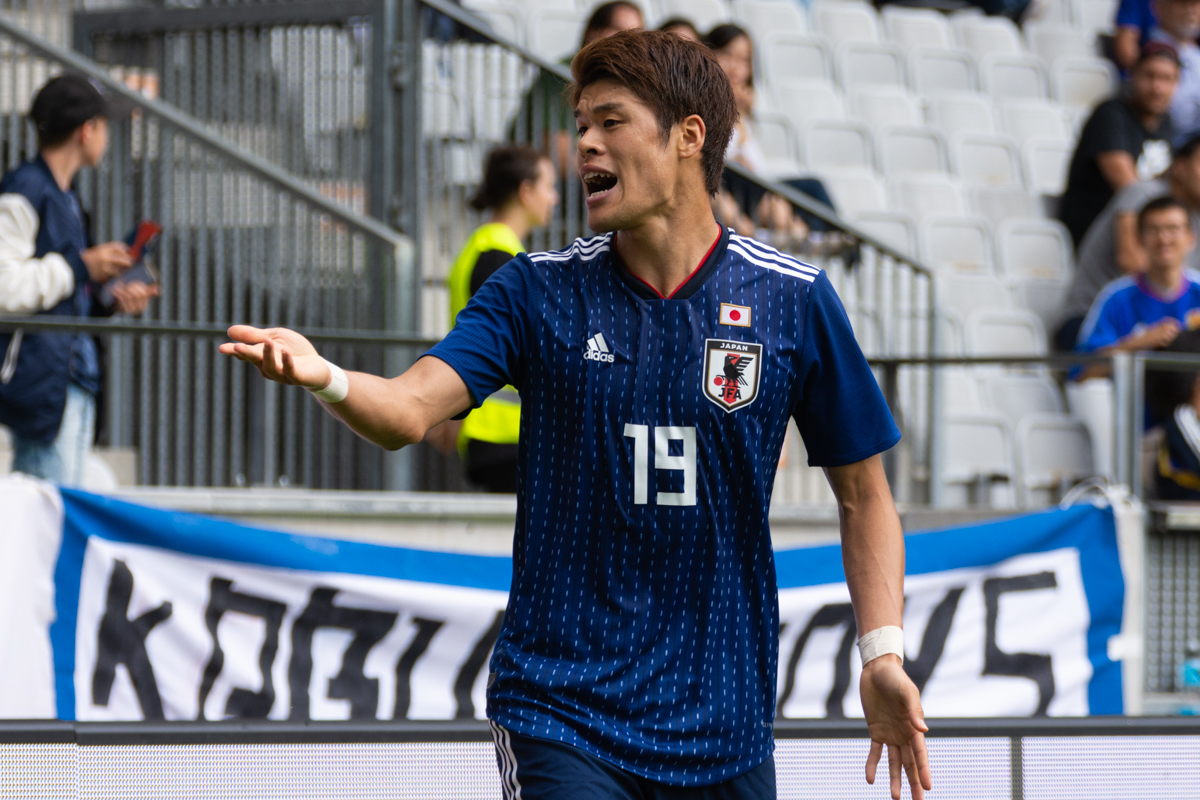
Sakai playing for Japan against Paraguay on 12 June 2018.

In October 2011, Sakai was called up for the first time to the senior squad for a match against Vietnam and Tajikistan, but he appeared as an unused substitute instead. After eight months since being called up to the Japan's national team, Sakai made his debut for the Samurai Blue, coming on as a second–half substitute, in a 2–0 win over Azerbaijan in the Kirin Challenge Cup on 23 May 2012. By April 2012, he began to adjust playing under Manager Alberto Zaccheroni, having understood his tactics and management. For the rest of 2012, Sakai continued to get more playing time for Japan, including making his first start for the Samurai Blue against United Arab Emirates on 6 September 2012.

In 2013, Sakai began to compete with Atsuto Uchida over the right–back position, which saw both each winning the position in number of matches. Six months later, he was called up by the Samurai Blue for the 2013 Confederations Cup squad. Sakai played two of the three matches in the group stage, losing both matches, and was eliminated from the tournament. Following the conclusion of the FIFA Confederations Cup tournament, he then started the next six Japan international matches in the absence of Uchida, who suffered a torn tendon and was eventually out for the 2013–14 season. During which, Sakai set up the equalising goal for Yoichiro Kakitani, in a 1–1 draw against Belgium on 19 November 2013.

In May 2014, Sakai was named in Japan's preliminary squad for the FIFA World Cup in Brazil. Eventually, he made it to the final cut for the 23-man squad. However, Sakai made no appearances in the FIFA World Cup, as he spent the rest of the campaign on the substitute bench. After the tournament ended, Sakai made his first appearance for the Samurai Blue in three months on 5 September 2014, in a 2–0 loss against Uruguay. However, he was absent from the AFC Asian Cup tournament under a new management of Javier Aguirre.

After Uchida's absent in recent matches of 2015, Sakai began to make an impact to keep his first team place for Japan. For the next two years, he established himself in the right–back position for the Samurai Blue and helped Japan qualify for the FIFA World Cup in Russia. Sakai also assisted five goals along the way, including two separate matches against Thailand.

In May 2018, Sakai was named in Japan's preliminary squad for the FIFA World Cup in Russia. Eventually, he made it to the final cut of the 23 men squad. Sakai made his World Cup debut against Colombia in Matchday 1 of the Group Stage, starting the whole game, in a 2–1 win. He started the next two matches for Samurai Blue, and eventually qualifying for the knockout stage, due to receiving fewer yellow cards than Senegal, becoming the only Asian team to do so in the 2018 World Cup. Sakai started in the match against Belgium in the round of 16 match, as Japan was knocked out of the tournament after losing 3–2.

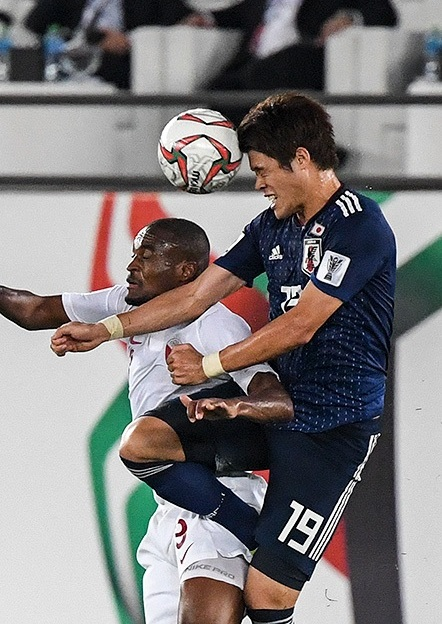
Sakai heading the ball away from Abdelkarim Hassan during the AFC Asian Cup final against Qatar.

Following the end of the World Cup, Sakai didn't receive another call–up from Japan until on 4 October 2018. He set up a goal for Ritsu Doan, in a 4–3 win against Uruguay on 16 October 2018. In a follow–up match against Venezuela, Sakai scored his first goal for the Samurai Blue, scoring the opening goal of the game, in a 1–1 draw. In December 2018, he was one of 23 Japanese players selected for the 2019 AFC Asian Cup. Sakai started in the right–back position and played two matches in the group stage to help Japan qualify for the knockout stage. He helped the Samurai Blue reach all the way to the AFC Asian Cup final and kept three consecutive clean sheets along the way. In the AFC Asian Cup final against Qatar, Sakai started the match in the right–back position, as Japan loss 3–1, finishing as runner–up in the process. Reflecting on the AFC Asian Cup final, he said: "It's a bad memory, I don't want to think about this final. Fortunately, OM was there when I came back and we won. Psychologically, I'm fine. Physically, I'm fine. Last season, we played every three days, I got used to that rhythm, so there's no problem."

Following the end of the AFC Asian Cup, Sakai didn't make another appearance for Japan until on 5 June 2019 against Trinidad and Tobago in the Kirin Challenge Cup, where he started the match, in a 0–0 draw. He then set up three goals in five matches for the Samurai Blue between 5 September 2019 and 14 November 2019.

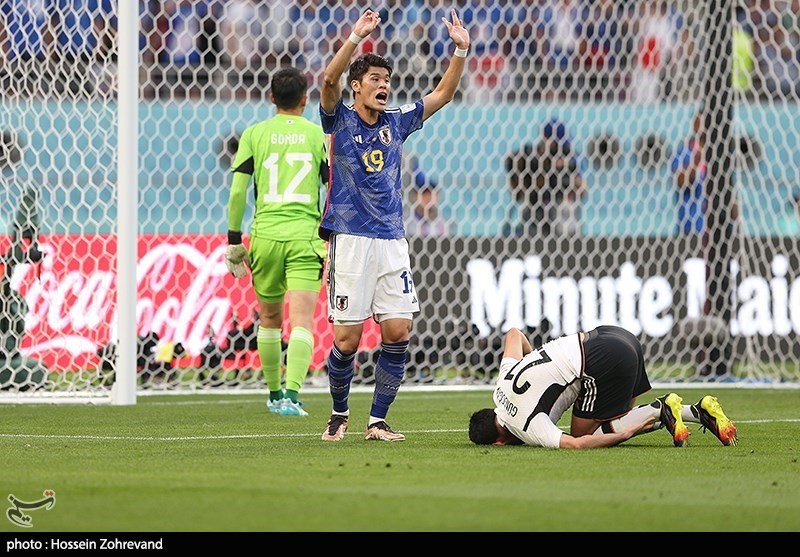
Sakai playing for Japan against Germany in the 2022 FIFA World Cup on 24 November 2022.

On 1 October 2020, Sakai was called up to the Japan's squad for the first time in eleven months, resulting in him making an appearance against Cameroon, drawing 0–0. In a match against Myanmar on 28 May 2021, he set up a goal for Yuya Osako, who scored five goals, in a 10–0. Sakai then five starts for the Samurai Blue in the FIFA World Cup qualification between September 2021 and February 2022.

Sakai had to wait until on 15 September 2022 when he was called up to the Japan's squad for the Kirin Cup Soccer. Sakai made his first appearance for the Samurai Blue in eight months, starting a match, in a 2–0 win against United States. On 1 November 2022, he was named in the final squad for the 2022 FIFA World Cup in Qatar. On 24 November 2022, Sakai started in the right–back position against Germany and played 75 minutes before being substituted for Takumi Minamino, who played a role for the equalising goal, in eventual Japan's 2–1 win. His next appearance for the Samurai Blue came against Croatia on 5 December 2022, coming on as a 75th-minute substitute, as the match eventually ended 1–1 with Japan crashing out after their defeat on penalties. Following the end of the tournament, he has not been called up the Samurai Blue's squad since.

== Personal life ==
Growing up, Sakai comes from a studious family, as his father is a doctor. One of his older brother is a researcher. Sakai said his idol growing up was Ronaldo and watched his performance in the 2002 FIFA World Cup. In 2014, Sakai revealed that he married a non-celebrity woman and described her as supportive of his football career. It was announced in November 2014 that Sakai would become a father and his wife gave birth to a baby girl in January 2015. On 27 September 2019, he announced that he's a father for the second time.

Sakai is a fan of Miso soup and once said: "Take only miso soup because miso soup is a necessity for me." In addition to speaking Japanese, Sakai speaks Portuguese, German (having learned the language twice a week during his time at Hannover 96), French and English. Since moving to Europe, Sakai spoke out the culture in Germany and France.

In May 2018, Sakai published his first book titled "Resetting Power 'Nature and the Mind Becomes Stronger' 46 Concept". In the wake of COVID-19 pandemic, he donated 20,000 euros to Phoceo Endowment Fund. Along with Yūki Ōtsu, they created a website to help the general public.

In August 2026, Sakai enrolled at Auckland University of Technology, where he began a part-time Master of Business Administration (MBA) through the Faculty of Business, Economics and Law, majoring in Business Studies.

== Career statistics ==
=== Club ===
As of match played 26 August 2026

Appearances and goals by club, season and competition
Club	Season	League			National cup (Note: Includes Emperor's Cup, DFB-Pokal, Coupe de France, Australia Cup)		League cup (Note: Includes J. League Cup, Coupe de la Ligue)		Continental		Other		Total	
Club	Season	Division	Apps	Goals	Apps	Goals	Apps	Goals	Apps	Goals	Apps	Goals	Apps	Goals
Kashiwa Reysol	2010	J2 League	9	1	3	0	—		—		—		12	1
Kashiwa Reysol	2011	J1 League	27	0	2	0	2	0	—		4 (Note: Appearances in FIFA Club World Cup)	1	35	1
Kashiwa Reysol	2012	J1 League	15	1	—		0	0	7 (Note: Appearances in AFC Champions League)	2	1 (Note: Appearance in Japanese Super Cup)	0	23	3
Kashiwa Reysol	Total		51	2	5	0	2	0	7	2	5	1	70	5
Hannover 96 II	2012–13	Regionalliga Nord	1	0	—		—		—		—		1	0
Hannover 96	2012–13	Bundesliga	13	0	1	0	—		3 (Note: Appearances in UEFA Europa League)	0	—		17	0
Hannover 96	2013–14	Bundesliga	26	1	2	0	—		—		—		28	1
Hannover 96	2014–15	Bundesliga	27	0	2	0	—		—		—		29	0
Hannover 96	2015–16	Bundesliga	26	1	2	0	—		—		—		28	1
Hannover 96	Total		93	2	7	0	—		3	0	0	0	103	2
Marseille	2016–17	Ligue 1	35	0	3	0	2	0	—		—		40	0
Marseille	2017–18	Ligue 1	33	0	2	0	1	0	14	1	—		50	1
Marseille	2018–19	Ligue 1	27	1	0	0	1	0	4	0	—		32	1
Marseille	2019–20	Ligue 1	21	0	3	0	1	0	—		—		25	0
Marseille	2020–21	Ligue 1	29	0	2	0	—		6 (Note: Appearances in UEFA Champions League)	0	1 (Note: Appearance in Trophée des Champions)	0	38	0
Marseille	Total		145	1	10	0	5	0	24	1	1	0	185	2
Urawa Red Diamonds	2021	J1 League	14	2	4	0	0	0	–		–		18	2
Urawa Red Diamonds	2022	J1 League	20	0	0	0	1	0	6	0	1	0	28	0
Urawa Red Diamonds	2023	J1 League	25	2	1	0	6	0	3	0	2 (Note: Appearances in FIFA Club World Cup)	0	37	2
Urawa Red Diamonds	2024	J1 League	10	0	–		1	0	–		–		11	0
Urawa Red Diamonds	Total		69	4	5	0	8	0	9	0	3	0	94	4
Auckland FC	2024–25	A League Men	25	3	–		–		–		2 (Note: Appearances in A-League Men finals series)	0	25	3
Auckland FC	2025–26	A League Men	18	0	4	0	–		–		4	0	26	0
Auckland FC	2026–27	A League Men	0	0	–		–		1 (Note: Appearance in FIFA Intercontinental Cup)	0	0	0	1	0
Career total			405	12	31	0	15	0	44	3	15	1	504	18

=== International ===
As of match played 5 December 2022

Appearances and goals by national team and year
National team	Year	Apps	Goals
Japan	2012	7	0
Japan	2013	7	0
Japan	2014	5	0
Japan	2015	6	0
Japan	2016	7	0
Japan	2017	9	0
Japan	2018	8	1
Japan	2019	12	0
Japan	2020	3	0
Japan	2021	4	0
Japan	2022	6	0
Total		74	1

Scores and results list Japan's goal tally first, score column indicates score after each Sakai goal.

List of international goals scored by Hiroki Sakai
No.	Date	Venue	Opponent	Score	Result	Competition
1	16 November 2018	Ōita Bank Dome, Ōita, Japan	Venezuela	1–0	1–1	2018 Kirin Challenge Cup

== Honours ==
Kashiwa Reysol

- J. League Division 1: 2011
- Japanese Super Cup: 2012
- J. League Division 2: 2010

Marseille

- UEFA Europa League runner-up: 2017–18

Urawa Red Diamonds

- AFC Champions League: 2022
- Emperor's Cup: 2021
- Japanese Super Cup: 2022

Auckland FC

- A-League Premiership: 2024–25
- A-League Men Championship: 2026

Japan

- AFC Asian Cup runner-up: 2019

Individual

- J. League Rookie of the Year: 2011
- J. League Best XI: 2011
- Olympique de Marseille Player of the Season: 2018–19
- AFC Champions League MVP: 2022
