= Robert Almer =

Austrian footballer (born 1984)

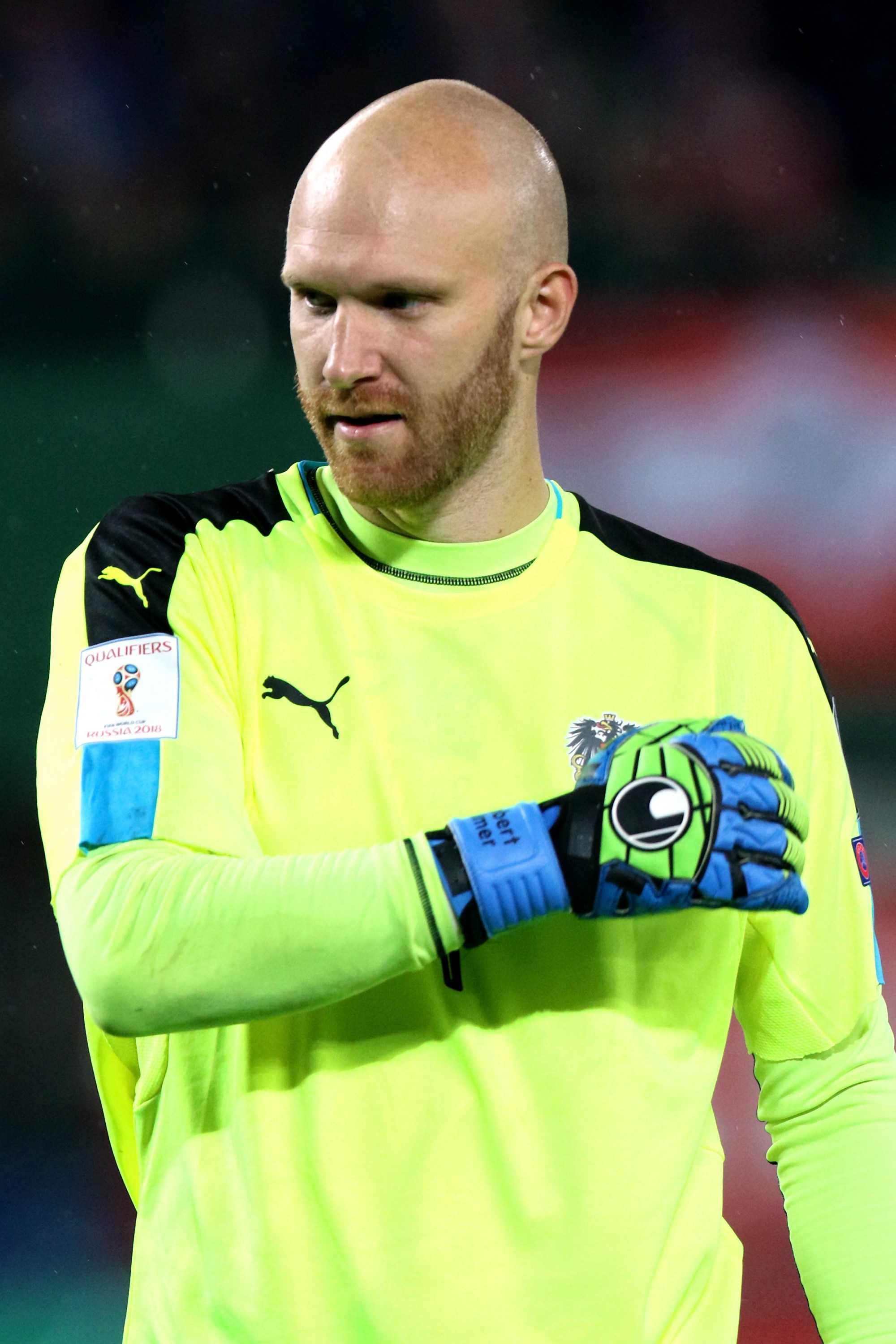
- Almer playing for Austria in 2016

Personal information
- Date of birth: 20 March 1984 (age 42)
- Place of birth: Bruck an der Mur, Austria
- Height: 1.94 m (6 ft 4 1/2 in)
- Position: Goalkeeper

Youth career
- SC Untersiebenbrunn

Senior career*
Years	Team	Apps	(Gls)
2002–2003	SC Untersiebenbrunn	10	(0)
2004–2005	DSV Leoben	13	(0)
2005–2006	FK Austria Wien Amateure	7	(0)
2006–2008	SV Mattersburg	20	(0)
2008–2011	Austria Wien	21	(0)
2011	Fortuna Düsseldorf II	2	(0)
2011–2013	Fortuna Düsseldorf	13	(0)
2013–2014	Energie Cottbus	18	(0)
2014–2015	Hannover 96	0	(0)
2015–2018	Austria Wien	31	(0)
Total		135	(0)

International career
2011–2016	Austria	33	(0)
- * Club domestic league appearances and goals

Robert Almer (born 20 March 1984) is an Austrian former professional footballer who played as a goalkeeper.

== Club career ==
After starting in the Austrian amateur leagues with SC Untersiebenbrunn and DSV Leoben, Almer was signed by FK Austria Wien and assigned to the club's reserve squad. In 2006, he joined SV Mattersburg and gained regular first team appearances for the team in the Austrian Bundesliga. He resigned for Austria Wien two years later as back-up for first choice goalkeeper Szabolcs Sáfár. During his first season back in Vienna, Almer was selected in goal for the 2009 Austrian Cup Final, winning his first major trophy.

Almer went on to play for Fortuna Düsseldorf and FC Energie Cottbus in the German 2. Bundesliga, before joining first division Hannover 96, where he failed to make a first team appearance. In 2015, he signed for Austria Wien for the third time, becoming the club's first choice goalkeeper and captain.

== International career ==
Almer debuted for the Austria national football team in a 2–1 loss to Ukraine on 15 November 2011. He was selected as first-choice goalkeeper for UEFA Euro 2016 and kept Austria's first clean sheet at a major tournament in 32 years during the 0–0 group stage draw with Portugal on 18 June 2016.

== Career statistics ==
=== Club ===
Appearances and goals by club, season and competition
Club	Season	League			National cup		League cup		Continental		Total	
Club	Season	Division	Apps	Goals	Apps	Goals	Apps	Goals	Apps	Goals	Apps	Goals
SC Untersiebenbrunn	2002–03	Austrian Regionalliga East	10	0	—		—		—		10	0
Rheindorf Altach	2003–04	Austrian Regionalliga West	0	0	—		—		—		0	0
DSV Leoben (loan)	2004–05	2. Liga	13	0	1	0	—		—		14	0
SV Mattersburg	2006–07	Austrian Bundesliga	9	0	3	0	0	0	—		12	0
SV Mattersburg	2007–08	Austrian Bundesliga	11	0	0	0	4	0	—		15	0
SV Mattersburg	Total		20	0	3	0	4	0	—		27	0
Austria Wien	2008–09	Austrian Bundesliga	5	0	4	0	0	0	—		9	0
Austria Wien	2009–10	Austrian Bundesliga	6	0	2	0	5	0	—		13	0
Austria Wien	2010–11	Austrian Bundesliga	10	0	3	0	0	0	—		13	0
Austria Wien	Total		21	0	9	0	5	0	—		35	0
Fortuna Düsseldorf II	2011–12	Regionalliga	2	0	—		—		—		2	0
Fortuna Düsseldorf	2011–12	2. Bundesliga	12	0	0	0	—		—		12	0
Fortuna Düsseldorf	2012–13	Bundesliga	1	0	0	0	—		—		1	0
Fortuna Düsseldorf	Total		13	0	0	0	—		—		13	0
Energie Cottbus	2013–14	2. Bundesliga	18	0	2	0	—		—		20	0
Hannover 96	2014–15	Bundesliga	0	0	0	0	—		—		0	0
Austria Wien	2015–16	Austrian Bundesliga	22	0	2	0	—		—		24	0
Austria Wien	2016–17	Austrian Bundesliga	9	0	0	0	7	0	—		16	0
Austria Wien	Total		31	0	2	0	7	0	—		40	0
Career total			128	0	17	0	16	0	0	0	161	0

=== International ===
Appearances and goals by national team and year
National team	Year	Apps	Goals
Austria	2011	1	0
Austria	2012	5	0
Austria	2013	7	0
Austria	2014	7	0
Austria	2015	6	0
Austria	2016	7	0
Total		33	0
