= Niklas Teichgräber =

German footballer (born 1996)

Personal information
- Date of birth: 7 February 1996 (age 30)
- Place of birth: Gehrden, Germany
- Height: 1.78 m (5 ft 10 in)
- Position: Left-back

Youth career
- –2007: VSV Hohenbostel
- 2007–2015: Hannover 96

Senior career*
Years	Team	Apps	(Gls)
2013–2017	Hannover 96 II	31	(0)
2015–2016	Hannover 96	0	(0)
2016	→ VfV Hildesheim (loan)	16	(1)
2017–2019	Germania Egestorf/Langreder	55	(2)
2019–2024	TSV Havelse	50	(1)

International career
2011–2012	Germany U16	4	(1)
2012–2013	Germany U17	5	(0)
- * Club domestic league appearances and goals

Niklas Teichgräber (born 7 February 1996) is a German former footballer who played as a left-back.

== Career ==
Teichgräber made his professional debut for TSV Havelse in the 3. Liga on 24 July 2021 against 1. FC Saarbrücken.
