= Leon Andreasen =

Danish footballer (born 1983)

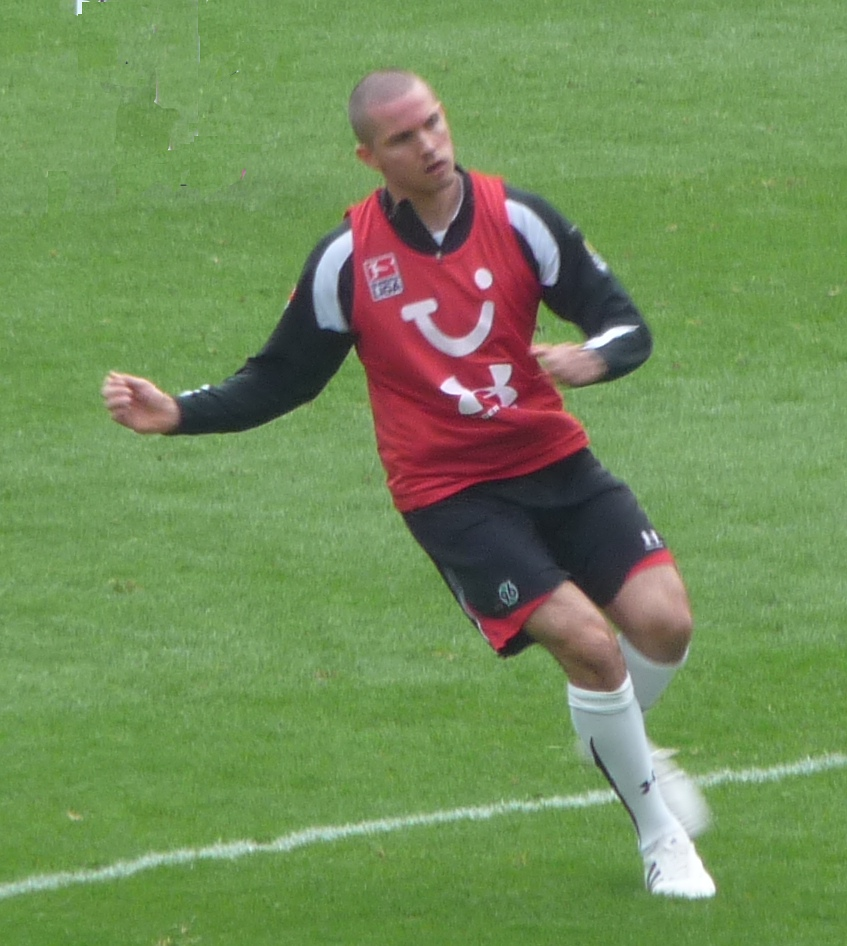
- Andreasen in 2010

Personal information
- Full name: Leon Hougaard Andreasen
- Date of birth: 23 April 1983 (age 43)
- Place of birth: Aidt, Denmark
- Height: 1.88 m (6 ft 2 in)
- Positions: Defender; midfielder

Youth career
- –1999: Hammel GF
- 1999–2001: AGF Aarhus

Senior career*
Years	Team	Apps	(Gls)
2001–2005	AGF Aarhus	105	(17)
2005–2008	Werder Bremen	32	(2)
2006–2007	→ Mainz 05 (loan)	15	(4)
2008–2009	Fulham	19	(0)
2009	→ Hannover 96 (loan)	11	(2)
2010–2016	Hannover 96	75	(9)
Total		257	(34)

International career
2001–2002	Denmark U19	6	(0)
2004	Denmark U20	2	(0)
2002–2006	Denmark U21	23	(6)
2007–2014	Denmark	20	(2)
- * Club domestic league appearances and goals

Leon Hougaard Andreasen (born 23 April 1983) is a Danish former professional footballer who played as a defender or midfielder. He won 20 caps and scored three goals for the Denmark national team.

== Biography ==
Born in Aidt, Jutland, Andreasen started playing football at local club Hammel GF. After a stay at the very popular football academy, Hessel Gods Fodboldkostskole in Grenaa, he moved on to the youth team of AGF Aarhus in 1999, where he signed his first contract in 2001. He established himself as a regular in AGF's squad for the top-flight Danish Superliga championship. He initially played as a right midfielder or right back, but eventually settled in the central defender position. He was called up for the Denmark under-19 national team in May 2001, and went on to play 31 games and score six goals for various Danish youth selections.

On 1 July 2005, he moved to Germany to play for SV Werder Bremen in Bundesliga championship. Due to the injury of Finnish defender Petri Pasanen, Andreasen played 12 of the first 17 league games for Werder Bremen. When Pasanen recovered in December 2005, Andreasen was often relegated to the reserves' bench for the second half of the season. In May 2006, he was selected for the Denmark under-21 national team squad for the 2006 European Under-21 Championship. As age restrictions were calculated from the start of the qualification matches in September 2004, he competed in the tournament at age 23. When the Denmark under-21s were eliminated in the preliminary group stage, Andreasen's youth national team career was over.

In his second season at Werder Bremen, Andreasen only played four games in the first half of the season. In January 2007, he was loaned out to German league rivals 1. FSV Mainz 05. He made his debut on 27 January against VfL Bochum, in the defensive midfielder position, and went on to score four goals in his first seven games for Mainz. Although he could not prevent Mainz from being relegated, his stay at Mainz was a great success. In March 2007, he was called up to the Denmark national team by national manager Morten Olsen. He made his debut against Spain, where he replaced Martin Jørgensen in the first half, before he was substituted for Nicklas Bendtner in the second half.

He joined Fulham in January 2008 for an undisclosed fee on a three-and-a-half-year deal that will see him at the club until the summer of 2011.

Andreasen had limited chances to establish a place at Fulham and therefore left the club for Germany's Hannover 96 in the winter break in 2009. He initially signed on loan for six months and after strong performances, made a permanent move.

On 18 October 2015, Andreasen scored one of the most blatant hand goals in football history when Hannover 96 defeated 1. FC Köln 1–0.

At the end of the 2015–16 season, when his contract with Hannover 96 ran out, Andreasen retired from playing.

=== International goals ===
Scores and results list Denmark's goal tally first, score column indicates score after each Andreasen goal.

List of international goals scored by Leon Andreasen
No.	Date	Venue	Opponent	Score	Result	Competition
1	1 April 2009	Parken Stadium, Copenhagen, Denmark	Albania	1–0	3–0	2010 FIFA World Cup qualification
2	6 September 2013	Ta' Qali National Stadium, Mdina, Malta	Malta	1–0	2–1	2014 FIFA World Cup qualification

== Honours ==
Werder Bremen

- DFL-Ligapokal: 2006
