= Vladimir Ranković =

German footballer

Personal information
- Date of birth: 27 June 1993 (age 33)
- Place of birth: Munich, Germany
- Height: 1.72 m (5 ft 7 1/2 in)
- Position: Right full-back

Youth career
- FC Hertha München
- SpVgg Unterhaching
- –2005: SV Pullach
- 2005–2012: Bayern Munich

Senior career*
Years	Team	Apps	(Gls)
2012–2014	Bayern Munich II	65	(3)
2013	Bayern Munich	0	(0)
2014–2016	Hannover 96	0	(0)
2014–2017	Hannover 96 II	47	(0)
2015	→ Erzgebirge Aue (loan)	11	(0)
2017–2019	Hansa Rostock	40	(1)
2020	FC Memmingen	0	(0)

International career
2009–2010	Germany U17	6	(0)
2011	Germany U18	2	(0)
2011–2012	Germany U19	8	(1)
2013	Germany U20	2	(0)
- * Club domestic league appearances and goals as of 17:26, 1 July 2020 (UTC)

Vladimir Ranković (born 27 June 1993) is a German professional footballer who plays as a right full-back.

== Club career ==
Ranković started playing football at the age of only four and joined then local FC Hertha München. Subsequently he went through the youth ranks of SpVgg Unterhaching and SV Pullach before moving to the youth academy of Bayern Munich in 2005 when he was twelve years old. Eventually he made it into Bayern Munich's second team, playing in fourth tier Regionalliga at that time, debuting as a starter in a league match versus SC Freiburg II on 11 March 2012. It remained his only cap in the 2011–12 season, although he became a team regular for the next and after next season (2012–14), playing 33 and 31 games respectively. On 4 May 2013, he received his first and only call for Bayern Munich in the Bundesliga, being an unused substitute in an away match against Borussia Dortmund. Under new head coach Pep Guardiola he also was allowed to participate in the first team's pre-season training for the 2013–14 Bundesliga.

In July 2014, when his contract with Bayern Munich had been expired, he moved to fellow Bundesliga side Hannover 96 on a free transfer, signing a three-year contract until 2017. For Hannover however, he did not receive a single call for an official match during the first leg of the 2014–15 campaign. In the winter break, he was consequently loaned to 2. Bundesliga side Erzgebirge Aue for the remainder of the season. For Aue he became a regular, starting in eleven matches consecutively. At the end of the season, Aue was relegated to the 3. Liga and Ranković returned to Hannover.

In June 2017, Ranković joined 3. Liga club Hansa Rostock on a free transfer, signing a two-year deal until 2019. Leaving Hansa at the end of his contract, he remained without club until 24 January 2020, where he signed for the rest of the season with Regionalliga Bayern club FC Memmingen.

== International career ==
Born in Germany, Ranković is of Serbian descent. From 2009 to 2013, Ranković has earned caps for several Germany national youth teams, most recently having served the U20 team.

== Career statistics ==
As of match played on 18 December 2018.

Club	Season	League			Cup		Other		Total		Ref.
Club	Season	Division	Apps	Goals	Apps	Goals	Apps	Goals	Apps	Goals	Ref.
Bayern Munich II	2011–12	Regionalliga Süd	1	0	—		—		1	0	
Bayern Munich II	2012–13	Regionalliga Bayern	32	1	—		—		32	1	
Bayern Munich II	2013–14	Regionalliga Bayern	30	2	—		1 (Note: Appearance in the Regionalliga promotion playoff.)	0	31	2	
Bayern Munich II	Totals		63	3	—		1	0	64	3	—
Hannover II	2014–15	Regionalliga Nord	11	0	—		—		11	0	
Hannover II	2015–16	Regionalliga Nord	16	0	—		—		16	0	
Hannover II	Totals		27	0	—		—		27	0	—
Erzgebirge Aue (loan)	2014–15	2. Bundesliga	11	0	0	0	—		11	0	
Hansa Rostock	2017–18	3. Liga	22	1	—		—		22	1	
Hansa Rostock	2018–19	3. Liga	11	0	1	0	—		12	0	
Hansa Rostock	Totals		33	1	1	0	—		34	1	—
Career totals			134	4	1	0	1	0	136	4	—

== Personal life ==
He is of Serbian ancestry and has three brothers.
