= Maurice Hirsch (footballer) =

German footballer

Personal information
- Date of birth: 30 May 1993 (age 33)
- Place of birth: Mannheim, Germany
- Height: 1.75 m (5 ft 9 in)
- Position: Defensive midfielder

Team information
- Current team: VfB Gartenstadt
- Number: 24

Youth career
- TSV Neckarau
- Waldhof Mannheim
- 2008–2012: 1899 Hoffenheim

Senior career*
Years	Team	Apps	(Gls)
2012–2014	1899 Hoffenheim II	47	(1)
2014–2017	Hannover 96 II	38	(1)
2014–2015	Hannover 96	7	(0)
2016	→ Greuther Fürth (loan)	6	(0)
2017–2018	Stuttgarter Kickers	17	(0)
2018–2019	Waldhof Mannheim	14	(1)
2019–	VfB Gartenstadt	15	(0)
- * Club domestic league appearances and goals as of 16:26, 27 November 2019 (UTC)

Maurice Hirsch (born 30 May 1993) is a German footballer who plays as a defensive midfielder for VfB Gartenstadt.

== Club career ==
Hirsch is a youth exponent from Hannover 96. He made his Bundesliga debut at 25 October 2014 against Borussia Dortmund substitung Marius Stankevičius after 72 minutes in a 0–1 away win. He joined SpVgg Greuther Fürth on 19 January 2016.
