= 2016–17 Hannover 96 season =

Hannover 96
2016–17 season
- President: Martin Kind
- Head Coach: Daniel Stendel (until 19 March); André Breitenreiter (from 20 March)
- Stadium: HDI-Arena
- 2. Bundesliga: 2nd (promoted)
- DFB–Pokal: Round of 16
- Top goalscorer: League: Martin Harnik (17); All: Martin Harnik (21)
- Highest home attendance: 49,000
- Lowest home attendance: 26,000
- Average home league attendance: 36,706
- Biggest win: Hannover 6–1 Düsseldorf
- Biggest defeat: Fürth 4–1 Hannover
Home colours	Away colours	Third colours

The 2016–17 Hannover 96 season was the first since being relegated from the Bundesliga.

== Background ==
Hannover were relegated from the Bundesliga. They had been in the Bundesliga for 14 seasons. This was the fifth time they were relegated from the Bundesliga. Hannover 96 are looking for a new coach. During the 2015–16 season, Michael Frontzeck resigned and Thomas Schaaf was sacked. Daniel Stendel took over for the rest of 2015–16 season as interim head coach and was eventually given the permanent job.

Florian Hübner and Sebastian Maier joined Hannover. Marcelo transferred to Beşiktaş after playing there on loan for the previous half year. Ron-Robert Zieler left the club.

== Players ==
Note: Flags indicate national team as defined under FIFA eligibility rules; some limited exceptions apply. Players may hold more than one non-FIFA nationality.

No.	Pos.	Nation	Player
1	GK	GER	Philipp Tschauner
3	DF	CHI	Miiko Albornoz
4	DF	NOR	Stefan Strandberg (on loan from (Russia) Krasnodar)
5	MF	SEN	Salif Sané
6	MF	GER	Marvin Bakalorz
7	MF	GER	Edgar Prib
8	MF	GER	Manuel Schmiedebach (captain)
9	FW	POL	Artur Sobiech
10	MF	GER	Sebastian Maier
11	MF	GER	Felix Klaus
13	GK	CRO	Marko Marić
14	FW	AUT	Martin Harnik
17	FW	DEN	Uffe Bech
18	MF	NOR	Iver Fossum

No.	Pos.	Nation	Player
19	DF	GER	Florian Hübner
20	DF	BRA	Felipe
22	DF	GER	Timo Hübers
24	FW	GER	Niclas Füllkrug
25	DF	GER	Oliver Sorg
26	FW	TUR	Kenan Karaman
28	DF	GER	Mike-Steven Bähre
30	GK	AUT	Samuel Şahin-Radlinger
31	DF	GER	Waldemar Anton
33	DF	GER	Fynn Arkenberg
35	FW	NED	Charlison Benschop
37	FW	GER	Noah Sarenren Bazee
40	GK	GER	Timo Königsmann

=== Out on loan ===
Note: Flags indicate national team as defined under FIFA eligibility rules; some limited exceptions apply. Players may hold more than one non-FIFA nationality.

No.	Pos.	Nation	Player
15	MF	GER	André Hoffmann (on loan to (Germany) Fortuna Düsseldorf until 30 June 2017)
21	FW	GER	Marius Wolf (on loan to (Germany) Eintracht Frankfurt until 30 June 2017)
29	FW	SEN	Babacar Guèye (on loan to (Belgium) Zulte Waregem until 30 June 2017)
39	FW	TUR	Mevlüt Erdinç (on loan to (France) FC Metz until 30 June 2017)

=== Transfers ===
==== In ====
No.	Pos.	Name	Age	Nat.	Moving from	Type	Transfer Window	Contract ends	Transfer fee	Ref.
4	DF	Stefan Strandberg	26	(Norway)	Krasnodar	Loan	Summer	30 June 2017	—	
6	MF	Marvin Bakalorz	26	(Germany)	Paderborn	Transfer	Summer	30 June 2019	Free	
10	MF	Sebastian Maier	22	(Germany)	St. Pauli	Transfer	Summer	30 June 2019	Free	
14	FW	Martin Harnik	29	(Austria)	Stuttgart	Transfer	Summer	30 June 2019	Free	
19	DF	Florian Hübner	25	(Germany)	Sandhausen	Transfer	Summer	30 June 2019	€500,000	
22	DF	Timo Hübers	19	(Germany)	Köln II	Transfer	Summer	30 June 2019	Free	
24	FW	Niclas Füllkrug	23	(Germany)	Nürnberg	Transfer	Summer	30 June 2020	€2.2 million	
28	MF	Mike-Steven Bähre	20	(Germany)	Halle	Return from loan	Summer	—	—	
29	FW	Babacar Guèye	21	(Senegal)	Troyes	Transfer	Summer	30 June 2019	Free	
—	FW	Mevlüt Erdinç	29	(Turkey)	Guingamp	Return from loan	Summer	—	—	
13	GK	Marko Marić	21	(Croatia)	1899 Hoffenheim	Loan	Winter	30 June 2017	—	

==== Out ====
No.	Pos.	Name	Age	Nat.	Moving to	Type	Transfer Window	Transfer fee	Ref.
1	GK	Ron-Robert Zieler	27	(Germany)	Leicester City	Transfer	Summer	€3.5 million	
2	MF	Leon Andreasen	33	(Denmark)	—	End of contract	Summer	—	
4	DF	Hiroki Sakai	26	(Japan)	Marseille	Transfer	Summer	Free	
6	MF	Ceyhun Gülselam	28	(Turkey)	Karabükspor	Release	Summer	—	
10	MF	Hiroshi Kiyotake	26	(Japan)	Sevilla	Transfer	Summer	€6.5 million	
14	MF	Allan Saint-Maximin	19	(France)	Monaco	End of loan	Summer	—	
16	MF	Hotaru Yamaguchi	25	(Japan)	Cerezo Osaka	Transfer	Summer	€1.5 million	
19	DF	Christian Schulz	33	(Germany)	Sturm Graz	End of contract	Summer	—	
22	FW	Hugo Almeida	32	(Portugal)	AEK Athens	Transfer	Summer	Free	
24	DF	Alexander Milošević	24	(Sweden)	Beşiktaş	End of loan	Summer	—	
28	FW	Ádám Szalai	28	(Hungary)	1899 Hoffenheim	End of loan	Summer	—	
—	FW	Mevlüt Erdinç	29	(Turkey)	Metz	Loan	Summer	—	
—	DF	Marcelo	29	(Brazil)	Beşiktaş	Transfer	Summer	€2 million	
15	MF	André Hoffmann	23	(Germany)	Düsseldorf	Loan	Winter	—	
21	FW	Marius Wolf	21	(Germany)	E. Frankfurt	Loan	Winter	—	
29	FW	Babacar Guèye	22	(Senegal)	Zulte Waregem	Loan	Winter	—	

== Friendlies ==
25 June 2016	Germania Walsrode	0–10	Hannover 96	Walsrode
16:00 CEST (UTC+02:00)		Report	Klaus 12'; Karaman 31', 41', 42'; Benschop 53'; Wolf 54', 70'; Dierßen 64', 85'; Maier 72'	Stadium: Grünenthal-Stadion

26 June 2016	TSV Barsinghausen	1–10	Hannover 96	Barsinghausen
15:00 CEST (UTC+02:00)	Just 86'	Report	Maier 16'; Benschop 23'; Klaus 30', 32'; Wolf 34'; Dierßen 38'; Hübner 43'; Karaman 48'; Fossum 75'; Sulejmani 88'	Stadium: REWE-Sportpark; Attendance: 1,100

6 July 2016	1. FC Wunstorf	1–3	Hannover 96	Wunstorf
18:00 CEST (UTC+02:00)	Scheffler 68'	Report	Sobiech 16', 33'; Prib 38'	Stadium: Barne-Arena

10 July 2016	SV Ramlingen-Ehlershausen	0–10	Hannover 96	Burgdorf-Ramlingen
15:00 CEST (UTC+02:00)		Report	Albornoz 3', 36'; Anton 13'; Sobiech 16', 26'; Sarenren Bazee 29'; Karaman 41'; Benschop 47'; Sulejmani 58'; Bakalorz 60'	Stadium: Waldstadion; Attendance: 2,010

14 July 2016	TuS Norderney	0–16	Hannover 96	Norderney
19:00 CEST (UTC+02:00)		Report	Benschop 6', 29'; Karaman 15', 22', 40'; Klaus 45'; Sané 47', 65'; Dierßen 48'; Sobiech 54'; Prib 60', 84'; Guèye 67', 76', 86'; Maier 87'	Stadium: Sportplatz an der Mühle

17 July 2016	NEC Nijmegen	2–5	Hannover 96	Rheine
15:00 CEST (UTC+02:00)	Quincy 32'; Dumić 53'	Report	Sané 18'; Maier 20'; Sulejmani 70'; Guèye 72'; Prib 83'	Stadium: OBI Arena

20 July 2016	Hannover 96	0–1	VfL Osnabrück	Barsinghausen
18:00 CEST (UTC+02:00)		Report	Reimerink 42'	Stadium: August-Wenzel-Stadion

23 July 2016	Hallescher FC	3–3	Hannover 96	Halle
15:00 CEST (UTC+02:00)	Röser 67', 78'; Stenzel 82'	Report	Füllkrug 22', 56'; Sobiech 74'	Stadium: Erdgas Sportpark

27 July 2016	Erzgebirge Aue	3–3	Hannover 96	Halberstadt
18:30 CEST (UTC+02:00)	Soukou 15'; Kvesić 47' (pen.); Köpke 52'	Report	Sobiech 3', 66'; Klaus 58'	Stadium: Friedensstadion

30 July 2016	Norwich City	2–3	Hannover 96	Norwich
15:00 BST (UTC+01:00)	Hoolahan 52', 58'	Report	Sobiech 5', 50'; Maier 12'	Stadium: Carrow Road

2 September 2016	Borussia Mönchengladbach	2–1	Hannover 96	Mönchengladbach
15:30 CEST (UTC+02:00)	Hahn 35'; Schulz 43'	Report	Guèye 20'	Stadium: Fohlenplatz, Borussia-Park; Attendance: 661

7 October 2016	Hannover 96	2–2	Holstein Kiel	Schneverdingen
16:30 CEST (UTC+02:00)	Prib 55'; Huth 79' (pen.)	Report	Dürholtz 68'; Siedschlag 76'	Stadium: Osterwald-Stadion; Attendance: 400

11 November 2016	Hannover 96	4–0	Carl Zeiss Jena	Hanover
18:00 CET (UTC+01:00)	Karaman 7'; Sarenren Bazee 11'; Füllkrug 45' (pen.), 51'	Report		Stadium: 96-Stadion

12 January 2017	Hannover 96	1–1	FC Augsburg	Algeciras
16:00 CET (UTC+01:00)	Sobiech 58'	Report	Bobadilla 63'	Stadium: Estadio Nuevo Mirador

15 January 2017	Hannover 96	2–1	BSC Young Boys	Jerez de la Frontera
15:00 CET (UTC+01:00)	Harnik 12'; Bech 55'	Report	Ravet 14'	Stadium: Campo Hotel Barceló Montecastillo Golf; Attendance: 60

21 January 2017	Hannover 96	4–1	Sportfreunde Lotte	Hanover
15:00 CET (UTC+01:00)	Füllkrug 2', 23'; Anton 68'; Sobiech 84'	Report	Pires-Rodrigues 33'	Stadium: 96-Stadion; Attendance: 1,750

23 March 2017	Hannover 96	3–1	FC Schalke 04	Hanover
18:30 CET (UTC+01:00)	Füllkrug 12'; Prib 60'; Sobiech 71'	Report	Coke 57'	Stadium: HDI-Arena; Attendance: 6,500; Referee: Bibiana Steinhaus

== 2. Bundesliga ==
=== Review ===
Hannover started the season on 5 August 2016 against 1. FC Kaiserslautern. Hannover won the match 4–0. Hannover then defeated Greuther Fürth 3–1. The first season loss came on the 4th matchday in a home match against Dynamo Dresden, which they lost 0–2. They recovered with three wins from the next four matches, only to lose two matches in a row against Union Berlin and 1. FC Nürnberg, respectively. From there on until the winter break they remained unbeaten, with four wins and three draws, causing them to spend the break in second place. They started the second half of the season with a 1–0 home win against Kaiserslautern, thereby moving up to first place for the first time since the second matchday.

On 20 March 2017, after only one win in the previous four matches, Hannover 96 sacked coach Daniel Stendel and appointed André Breitenreiter as new head coach.

=== League table ===
Pos	Team	Pld	W	D	L	GF	GA	GD	Pts	Promotion, qualification or relegation
1	VfB Stuttgart (C, P)	34	21	6	7	63	37	+26	69	Promotion to Bundesliga
2	Hannover 96 (P)	34	19	10	5	51	32	+19	67	Promotion to Bundesliga
3	Eintracht Braunschweig	34	19	9	6	50	36	+14	66	Qualification for promotion play-offs
4	Union Berlin	34	18	6	10	51	39	+12	60	
5	Dynamo Dresden	34	13	11	10	53	46	+7	50	

Source: DFB
Rules for classification: 1) Points; 2) Goal difference; 3) Goals scored
(C) Champions; (P) Promoted

=== Results summary ===
Overall								Home						Away					
Pld	W	D	L	GF	GA	GD	Pts	W	D	L	GF	GA	GD	W	D	L	GF	GA	GD
34	19	10	5	51	32	+19	67	14	2	1	26	9	+17	5	8	4	25	23	+2

Last updated: 21 May 2017.

=== Results by round ===
Round	1	2	3	4	5	6	7	8	9	10	11	12	13	14	15	16	17	18	19	20	21	22	23	24	25	26	27	28	29	30	31	32	33	34
Ground	A	H	A	H	A	H	A	H	A	A	H	A	H	A	H	A	H	H	A	H	A	H	A	H	A	H	H	A	H	A	H	A	H	A
Result	W	W	D	L	D	W	W	W	L	L	W	D	W	D	W	W	D	W	L	W	W	D	L	W	D	W	W	D	W	D	W	W	W	D
Position	1	1	2	3	6	4	3	2	3	5	3	4	3	3	3	3	2	1	2	2	2	2	3	3	4	4	1	3	2	3	3	3	2	2

Updated to match(es) played on 21 May 2017. Source: 2. Bundesliga
A = Away; H = Home; W = Win; D = Draw; L = Loss

=== League fixtures and results ===
5 August 2016 1	1. FC Kaiserslautern	0–4	Hannover 96	Kaiserslautern
20:30 CEST (UTC+02:00)		Report	Maier 16'; Anton 48'; Sobiech 63', 84'	Stadium: Fritz-Walter-Stadion; Attendance: 40,021; Referee: Wolfgang Stark

14 August 2016 2	Hannover 96	3–1	Greuther Fürth	Hanover
13:30 CEST (UTC+02:00)	Fossum 23'; Maier 74', (yellow card) 76'; Harnik 85'	Report	Gjasula (yellow card) 76'; Tripić (yellow card) 79'; Berisha 90', (yellow card) 90+2'	Stadium: HDI-Arena; Attendance: 38,400; Referee: Jochen Drees

27 August 2016 3	VfL Bochum	1–1	Hannover 96	Bochum
18:30 CEST (UTC+02:00)	Perthel (yellow card) 4'; Wurtz 72'	Report	Albornoz (yellow card) 27'; Schmiedebach (yellow card) 46'; Sané 74'; Harnik (yellow card) 90+2'	Stadium: Vonovia-Ruhrstadion; Attendance: 19,218; Referee: Markus Schmidt

11 September 2016 4	Hannover 96	0–2	Dynamo Dresden	Hanover
13:30 CEST (UTC+02:00)	Tschauner (yellow card) 79'; Sané (red card) 79'	Report	Stefaniak 18'; Lambertz (yellow card) 39'; Ballas 57'; Kutschke (yellow card) 79'; Teixeira (yellow card) 83'; Müller (yellow card) 84'	Stadium: HDI-Arena; Attendance: 39,200; Referee: Sören Storks

18 September 2016 5	Arminia Bielefeld	3–3	Hannover 96	Bielefeld
13:30 CEST (UTC+02:00)	Klos 26' (pen.), 31', (yellow card) 45+2'; Hemlein (yellow card) 45+3'; Mak (yellow card) 63'; Schütz (yellow card) 75'; Behrendt 79'; Hornig (yellow card) 84'	Report	Strandberg (yellow card) 25'; Schuppan 45+1', 90+1' (o.g.); Karaman 69'	Stadium: Schüco-Arena; Attendance: 25,138; Referee: Martin Petersen

21 September 2016 6	Hannover 96	1–0	Karlsruher SC	Hanover
17:30 CEST (UTC+02:00)	Klaus 7', (yellow card) 83'; Schmiedebach (yellow card) 73'	Report	Kom (yellow card) 20'; Rolim (yellow card) 33'; Diamantakos (yellow card) 67'	Stadium: HDI-Arena; Attendance: 31,700; Referee: Christian Dietz

25 September 2016 7	1860 Munich	0–2	Hannover 96	Munich
13:30 CEST (UTC+02:00)	Matmour (yellow card) 79'	Report	Karaman 67'; Albornoz (yellow card) 76'; Harnik 87'	Stadium: Allianz Arena; Attendance: 26,100; Referee: Timo Gerach

1 October 2016 8	Hannover 96	2–0	FC St. Pauli	Hanover
13:00 CEST (UTC+02:00)	Klaus (yellow card) 67', (goal) 90+3'; Karaman 75'	Report	Kalla (yellow card) 63'; Nehrig (yellow card) 74'	Stadium: HDI-Arena; Attendance: 49,000; Referee: Felix Brych

16 October 2016 9	Union Berlin	2–1	Hannover 96	Berlin
13:30 CEST (UTC+02:00)	Kreilach (yellow card) 10'; Trimmel (yellow card) 27'; Parensen (yellow card) 44'; Quaner 75'; Hosiner 79'; Fürstner (yellow card) 89'	Report	Anton (yellow card) 12'; Karaman (yellow card) 17'; Klaus 90+6', (yellow card) 90+8'	Stadium: Stadion An der Alten Försterei; Attendance: 22,012; Referee: Robert Hartmann

23 October 2016 10	1. FC Nürnberg	2–0	Hannover 96	Nuremberg
13:30 CEST (UTC+02:00)	Matavž 4'; Burgstaller 21'; Mühl (yellow card) 54'; Brečko (yellow card) 73'; Petrák (yellow card) 81'; Behrens (yellow card) 85'	Report	Bakalorz (yellow card) 19'; Anton (yellow card) 40'; Klaus (yellow card) 42'; Strandberg (yellow card) 48'; Sané (yellow card) 82'	Stadium: Grundig-Stadion; Attendance: 27,387; Referee: Matthias Jöllenbeck

30 October 2016 11	Hannover 96	3–1	Würzburger Kickers	Hanover
13:30 CET (UTC+01:00)	Felipe (yellow card) 50'; Harnik 59' (pen.), 90+6'; Klaus 67'	Report	Soriano 24'; Díaz (yellow card) 53'; Neumann (yellow card) 73'	Stadium: HDI-Arena; Attendance: 31,200; Referee: Martin Thomsen

6 November 2016 12	Eintracht Braunschweig	2–2	Hannover 96	Braunschweig
13:30 CET (UTC+01:00)	Reichel 17'; Correia (yellow card) 26'; Hernández 36'; Schönfeld (yellow card) 37'	Report	Prib (yellow card) 13'; Anton (yellow card) 22'; Felipe (yellow card) 31'; Harnik 38', (yellow card) 69'; Karaman 66'	Stadium: Eintracht-Stadion; Attendance: 23,000; Referee: Felix Zwayer

19 November 2016 13	Hannover 96	2–0	Erzgebirge Aue	Hanover
13:00 CET (UTC+01:00)	Harnik 23', (yellow card) 58'; Anton (yellow card) 72'; Füllkrug 77'	Report	Adler (yellow card) 69'; Kaufmann (yellow card) 72'; Köpke (yellow card) 82'; Fandrich (yellow card) 90+3'	Stadium: HDI-Arena; Attendance: 31,100; Referee: Christof Günsch

25 November 2016 14	Fortuna Düsseldorf	2–2	Hannover 96	Düsseldorf
18:30 CET (UTC+01:00)	Bebou 52'; Schauerte (yellow card) 54'; Schmitz (yellow card) 60'; Bormuth 67'; Bellinghausen (yellow card) 76'	Report	Karaman 17'; Strandberg (yellow card) 29'; Felipe (yellow card) 38' (yellow-red card) 70', (goal) 61'; Klaus (yellow card) 66'; Sané (yellow card) 84'	Stadium: Esprit Arena; Attendance: 28,122; Referee: Robert Kempter

2 December 2016 15	Hannover 96	3–2	1. FC Heidenheim	Hanover
18:30 CET (UTC+01:00)	Harnik 45+1'; Füllkrug 68'; Sarenren Bazee 70'	Report	Verhoek 42'; Titsch-Rivero (yellow card) 55'; Anton 60' (o.g.); Griesbeck (yellow card) 83'	Stadium: HDI-Arena; Attendance: 28,500; Referee: Thorben Siewer

12 December 2016 16	VfB Stuttgart	1–2	Hannover 96	Stuttgart
20:15 CET (UTC+01:00)	Terodde 12'; Großkreutz (yellow card) 39'; Pavard (yellow card) 76'; Baumgartl (red card) 90+3'	Report	Harnik 26'; Sorg (yellow card) 41'; Klaus 87'	Stadium: Mercedes-Benz Arena; Attendance: 47,125; Referee: Felix Brych

18 December 2016 17	Hannover 96	0–0	SV Sandhausen	Hanover
13:30 CET (UTC+01:00)	Füllkrug (yellow card) 58'; Klaus (yellow card) 68'	Report	Linsmayer (yellow card) 27'; Kosecki (yellow card) 35'; Klingmann (yellow card) 62'	Stadium: HDI-Arena; Attendance: 30,296; Referee: Christian Dingert

30 January 2017 18	Hannover 96	1–0	1. FC Kaiserslautern	Hanover
20:15 CET (UTC+01:00)	Bech 49'; Prib (yellow card) 63'; Karaman (yellow card) 90+3'	Report	Ziegler (yellow card) 51'	Stadium: HDI-Arena; Attendance: 28,800; Referee: Benjamin Cortus

3 February 2017 19	Greuther Fürth	4–1	Hannover 96	Fürth
18:30 CET (UTC+01:00)	Dursun 16', 64'; Franke 2'; Caligiuri (yellow card) 31'; Hofmann (yellow card) 39'; Žulj (yellow card) 63'; Berisha 67'; Pintér (yellow card) 84'; Gießelmann (yellow card) 87'	Report	Sané (yellow card) 27'; Strandberg (yellow card) 31'; Prib (yellow card) 52', (goal) 87'	Stadium: Sportpark Ronhof Thomas Sommer; Attendance: 8,465; Referee: Robert Kempter

13 February 2017 20	Hannover 96	2–1	VfL Bochum	Hanover
20:15 CET (UTC+01:00)	Harnik 45', 63' (pen.); Schmiedebach (yellow card) 61'; Prib (yellow card) 88'	Report	Wurtz 16'; Losilla (yellow card) 67'; Hoogland (yellow card) 90+1'	Stadium: HDI-Arena; Attendance: 26,000; Referee: Tobias Stieler

19 February 2017 21	Dynamo Dresden	1–2	Hannover 96	Dresden
13:30 CET (UTC+01:00)	Müller (yellow card) 6'; Kutschke 78'	Report	Prib (yellow card) 24'; Hübner (yellow card) 38'; Anton (yellow card) 40'; Bakalorz (yellow card) 54'; Klaus (yellow card) 57'; Harnik 64'; Karaman 80'	Stadium: DDV-Stadion; Attendance: 29,820; Referee: Florian Badstübner

25 February 2017 22	Hannover 96	2–2	Arminia Bielefeld	Hanover
13:00 CET (UTC+01:00)	Harnik 37' (pen.); Sané 57', (yellow card) 89'; Maier (yellow card) 75'; Schmiedebach (yellow card) 90+1'	Report	Hemlein 28'; Klos 45+2' (pen.), (yellow card) 70'; Schütz (yellow card) 50'; Voglsammer (yellow card) 84'	Stadium: HDI-Arena; Attendance: 36,700; Referee: Felix Brych

4 March 2017 23	Karlsruher SC	2–0	Hannover 96	Karlsruhe
13:00 CET (UTC+01:00)	Mugoša 10'; Prömel (yellow card) 21'; Valentini (yellow card) 37'; Diamantakos 70' (pen.)	Report	Bakalorz (yellow card) 26'; Sarenren Bazee (yellow card) 35'; Schmiedebach (yellow card) 59'; Albornoz (yellow card) 87'	Stadium: Wildparkstadion; Attendance: 15,415; Referee: Patrick Alt

11 March 2017 24	Hannover 96	1–0	1860 Munich	Hanover
13:00 CET (UTC+01:00)	Sané (yellow card) 49'; Harnik 55'; Maier (yellow card) 60'; Prib (yellow card) 81'	Report	Lacazette (yellow card) 90'	Stadium: HDI-Arena; Attendance: 34,600; Referee: Daniel Schlager

18 March 2017 25	FC St. Pauli	0–0	Hannover 96	Hamburg
13:00 CET (UTC+01:00)	Buchtmann (yellow card) 75'; Kalla (yellow card) 88'; Bouhaddouz (yellow card) 90'	Report	Schmiedebach (yellow card) 28'; Maier (yellow card) 58'	Stadium: Millerntor-Stadion; Attendance: 29,546; Referee: Felix Zwayer

1 April 2017 26	Hannover 96	2–0	Union Berlin	Hanover
13:00 CEST (UTC+02:00)	Füllkrug 54'; Kreilach 67' (o.g.)	Report	Daube (yellow card) 62'	Stadium: HDI-Arena; Attendance: 49,000; Referee: Robert Hartmann

4 April 2017 27	Hannover 96	1–0	1. FC Nürnberg	Hanover
17:30 CEST (UTC+02:00)	Sorg (yellow card) 28'; Schmiedebach (yellow card) 39'; Harnik 47'; Maier (yellow card) 90+1'	Report	Kammerbauer (yellow card) 71'; Schäfer (yellow card) 85'	Stadium: HDI-Arena; Attendance: 34,000; Referee: René Rohde

7 April 2017 28	Würzburger Kickers	0–0	Hannover 96	Würzburg
18:30 CEST (UTC+02:00)	Nagy (yellow card) 40'	Report	Schmiedebach (yellow card) 53'; Hübner (yellow card) 76'; Harnik (yellow card) 90+4'	Stadium: Flyeralarm Arena; Attendance: 12,450; Referee: Alexander Sather

15 April 2017 29	Hannover 96	1–0	Eintracht Braunschweig	Hanover
13:00 CEST (UTC+02:00)	Füllkrug 32'; Hübner (yellow card) 41'; Sobiech (yellow card) 90+2'	Report	Moll (yellow card) 37'	Stadium: HDI-Arena; Attendance: 42,700; Referee: Sascha Stegemann

22 April 2017 30	Erzgebirge Aue	2–2	Hannover 96	Aue
13:00 CEST (UTC+02:00)	Hertner (yellow card) 7'; Köpke 35'; Riese (yellow card) 90+1'; Nazarov 90+4'	Report	Anton 3'; Harnik 59'; Prib (yellow card) 62'; Hübner (yellow card) 87'	Stadium: Sparkassen-Erzgebirgsstadion; Attendance: 9,700; Referee: Benjamin Cortus

30 April 2017 31	Hannover 96	1–0	Fortuna Düsseldorf	Hanover
13:30 CEST (UTC+02:00)	Füllkrug 8'; Schmiedebach (yellow card) 20'; Prib (yellow card) 54'; Bakalorz (yellow card) 61'; Sané (yellow card) 85'	Report	Schmitz (yellow card) 70'; Yıldırım (yellow card) 73'; Ferati (yellow card) 82'; Madlung (yellow card) 90+3'	Stadium: HDI-Arena; Attendance: 42,800; Referee: Deniz Aytekin

5 May 2017 32	1. FC Heidenheim	0–2	Hannover 96	Heidenheim
18:30 CEST (UTC+02:00)	Kleindienst (yellow card) 38'; Strauß (yellow card) 41'; Schnatterer (yellow card) 58'	Report	Harnik 16', 25'; Sané (yellow card) 56'; Prib (yellow card) 71'; Albornoz (yellow card) 90+2'	Stadium: Voith-Arena; Attendance: 13,000; Referee: Christian Dingert

14 May 2017 33	Hannover 96	1–0	VfB Stuttgart	Hanover
15:30 CEST (UTC+02:00)	Klaus 40'; Prib (yellow card) 53'; Sané (red card) 86'; Harnik (yellow card) 89'	Report		Stadium: HDI-Arena; Attendance: 49,000; Referee: Wolfgang Stark

21 May 2017 34	SV Sandhausen	1–1	Hannover 96	Sandhausen
15:30 CEST (UTC+02:00)	Pledl 57'; Łukasik (yellow card) 64'	Report	Anton (yellow card) 33'; Fossum (yellow card) 40'; Klaus (yellow card) 56'; Hübner 60'; Felipe (yellow card) 64'; Karaman (yellow card) 69'	Stadium: BWT-Stadion am Hardtwald; Attendance: 12,470; Referee: Benjamin Cortus

== DFB-Pokal ==
=== DFB-Pokal review ===
In the first round draw, Hannover were drawn against Kickers Offenbach, beating them 3–2 after extra time by means of a last-minute penalty goal by Salif Sané. They went on to face Fortuna Düsseldorf in the second round, beating them 6–1, their highest season win. For the round of 16, they were drawn against Bundesliga side Eintracht Frankfurt, against who they lost 1–2 after initially taking the lead and were thereby eliminated.

=== DFB-Pokal fixtures and results ===
22 August 2016 1st Round	Kickers Offenbach	2–3 (a.e.t.)	Hannover 96	Offenbach
18:30 CEST (UTC+02:00)	Firat 29', 49'; Gaul (yellow card) 58'; Maslanka (yellow card) 59' (yellow-red card) 61'; Scheu (yellow card) 71'; Vetter (yellow card) 74'	Report	Harnik 3'; Klaus 22'; Anton (red card) 48'; Sorg (yellow card) 88'; Prib (yellow card) 112'; Sané 120+1' (pen.)	Stadium: Sparda-Bank-Hessen-Stadion; Attendance: 10,573; Referee: Thorben Siewer

26 October 2016 2nd Round	Hannover 96	6–1	Fortuna Düsseldorf	Hanover
18:30 CEST (UTC+02:00)	Sobiech 5'; Klaus 7', 34'; Harnik 15', 16'; Maier 53'	Report	Akpoguma 20', (yellow card) 69'; Schmitz (red card) 76'	Stadium: HDI-Arena; Attendance: 20,500; Referee: Benjamin Cortus

8 February 2017 Round of 16	Hannover 96	1–2	Eintracht Frankfurt	Hanover
20:45 CET (UTC+01:00)	Harnik 57'; Bakalorz (yellow card) 67'; Füllkrug (yellow card) 90+1'	Report	Tawatha 62'; Seferovic 66'; Mascarell (yellow card) 90+1'	Stadium: HDI-Arena; Attendance: 31,000; Referee: Robert Kampka

== Statistics ==
=== Appearances and goals ===
As of 21 May 2017

No.	Pos	Nat	Player	Total		2. Bundesliga		DFB-Pokal	
No.	Pos	Nat	Player	Apps	Goals	Apps	Goals	Apps	Goals
Goalkeepers
1	GK	(Germany) GER	Philipp Tschauner	32	0	32	0	0	0
13	GK	(Croatia) CRO	Marko Marić	0	0	0	0	0	0
30	GK	(Austria) AUT	Samuel Şahin-Radlinger	5	0	2	0	3	0
40	GK	(Germany) GER	Timo Königsmann	0	0	0	0	0	0
Defenders
3	DF	(Chile) CHI	Miiko Albornoz	27	0	23+4	0	0	0
4	DF	(Norway) NOR	Stefan Strandberg	13	0	12	0	1	0
19	DF	(Germany) GER	Florian Hübner	15	1	14+1	1	0	0
20	DF	(Brazil) BRA	Felipe	7	1	4+2	1	1	0
22	DF	(Germany) GER	Timo Hübers	0	0	0	0	0	0
25	DF	(Germany) GER	Oliver Sorg	28	0	26	0	2	0
27	DF	(Germany) GER	Vladimir Ranković	0	0	0	0	0	0
31	DF	(Germany) GER	Waldemar Anton	33	2	29+2	2	2	0
33	DF	(Germany) GER	Fynn Arkenberg	3	0	1	0	2	0
Midfielders
5	MF	(Senegal) SEN	Salif Sané	31	3	26+2	2	2+1	1
6	MF	(Germany) GER	Marvin Bakalorz	32	0	28+2	0	2	0
7	MF	(Germany) GER	Edgar Prib	30	1	22+5	1	3	0
8	MF	(Germany) GER	Manuel Schmiedebach	28	0	24+2	0	2	0
10	MF	(Germany) GER	Sebastian Maier	19	3	10+6	2	2+1	1
11	MF	(Germany) GER	Felix Klaus	33	9	28+2	6	3	3
18	MF	(Norway) NOR	Iver Fossum	27	1	15+10	1	1+1	0
28	MF	(Germany) GER	Mike-Steven Bähre	2	0	0+2	0	0	0
34	MF	(Germany) GER	Tim Dierßen	0	0	0	0	0	0
Forwards
9	FW	(Poland) POL	Artur Sobiech	24	3	11+11	2	1+1	1
14	FW	(Austria) AUT	Martin Harnik	33	21	25+5	17	3	4
17	FW	(Denmark) DEN	Uffe Bech	7	1	4+3	1	0	0
24	FW	(Germany) GER	Niclas Füllkrug	28	5	13+13	5	1+1	0
26	FW	(Turkey) TUR	Kenan Karaman	34	6	17+14	6	1+2	0
32	FW	(Germany) GER	Elias Huth	1	0	0+1	0	0	0
35	FW	(Netherlands) NED	Charlison Benschop	2	0	0+2	0	0	0
37	FW	(Germany) GER	Noah Sarenren Bazee	14	1	8+5	1	1	0
38	FW	(Kosovo) KOS	Valmir Sulejmani	1	0	0+1	0	0	0
Players transferred out during the season
15	MF	(Germany) GER	André Hoffmann	0	0	0	0	0	0
21	FW	(Germany) GER	Marius Wolf	0	0	0	0	0	0
29	FW	(Senegal) SEN	Babacar Guèye	4	0	0+2	0	0+2	0

=== Goalscorers ===
Rank	No.	Pos	Nat	Name	2. Bundesliga	DFB-Pokal	Total
1	14	FW	(Austria)	Martin Harnik	17	4	21
2	11	MF	(Germany)	Felix Klaus	6	3	9
3	26	FW	(Turkey)	Kenan Karaman	6	0	6
4	24	FW	(Germany)	Niclas Füllkrug	5	0	5
5	5	MF	(Senegal)	Salif Sané	2	1	3
5	9	FW	(Poland)	Artur Sobiech	2	1	3
5	10	MF	(Germany)	Sebastian Maier	2	1	3
8	31	DF	(Germany)	Waldemar Anton	2	0	2
9	7	MF	(Germany)	Edgar Prib	1	0	1
9	17	FW	(Denmark)	Uffe Bech	1	0	1
9	18	MF	(Norway)	Iver Fossum	1	0	1
9	19	DF	(Germany)	Florian Hübner	1	0	1
9	20	DF	(Brazil)	Felipe	1	0	1
9	37	FW	(Germany)	Noah Sarenren Bazee	1	0	1
Own goal					3	0	3
Totals					51	10	61

Last updated: 21 May 2017

=== Clean sheets ===
Rank	No.	Pos	Nat	Name	2. Bundesliga	DFB-Pokal	Total
1	1	GK	(Germany)	Philipp Tschauner	16	0	16
Totals					16	0	16

Last updated: 14 May 2017

=== Disciplinary record ===
No.	Pos	Nat	Player	2. Bundesliga			DFB-Pokal			Total		
No.	Pos	Nat	Player	Yellow card	(yellow card) (yellow-red card)	Red card	Yellow card	(yellow card) (yellow-red card)	Red card	Yellow card	(yellow card) (yellow-red card)	Red card
1	GK	(Germany)	Philipp Tschauner	1	0	0	0	0	0	1	0	0
3	DF	(Chile)	Miiko Albornoz	4	0	0	0	0	0	4	0	0
4	DF	(Norway)	Stefan Strandberg	4	0	0	0	0	0	4	0	0
5	MF	(Senegal)	Salif Sané	8	0	2	0	0	0	8	0	2
6	MF	(Germany)	Marvin Bakalorz	4	0	0	1	0	0	5	0	0
7	MF	(Germany)	Edgar Prib	10	0	0	1	0	0	11	0	0
8	MF	(Germany)	Manuel Schmiedebach	9	0	0	0	0	0	9	0	0
9	FW	(Poland)	Artur Sobiech	1	0	0	0	0	0	1	0	0
10	MF	(Germany)	Sebastian Maier	5	0	0	0	0	0	5	0	0
11	MF	(Germany)	Felix Klaus	8	0	0	0	0	0	8	0	0
14	FW	(Austria)	Martin Harnik	5	0	0	0	0	0	5	0	0
18	MF	(Norway)	Iver Fossum	1	0	0	0	0	0	1	0	0
19	DF	(Germany)	Florian Hübner	4	0	0	0	0	0	4	0	0
20	DF	(Brazil)	Felipe	3	1	0	0	0	0	3	1	0
24	FW	(Germany)	Niclas Füllkrug	1	0	0	1	0	0	2	0	0
25	DF	(Germany)	Oliver Sorg	2	0	0	1	0	0	3	0	0
26	FW	(Turkey)	Kenan Karaman	3	0	0	0	0	0	3	0	0
30	GK	(Austria)	Samuel Şahin-Radlinger	1	0	0	0	0	0	1	0	0
31	DF	(Germany)	Waldemar Anton	6	0	0	0	0	1	6	0	1
37	FW	(Germany)	Noah Sarenren Bazee	2	0	0	0	0	0	2	0	0
Totals				82	1	2	4	0	1	86	1	3

Last updated: 21 May 2017
