= 2013–14 Hannover 96 season =

Hannover 96 2013–14 football season

Hannover 96
2013–14 season
- Chairman: Martin Kind
- Manager: Tayfun Korkut
- Stadium: HDI-Arena, Hannover, Germany
- Bundesliga: 10th
- DFB-Pokal: Second round
- Top goalscorer: League: Mame Biram Diouf (8 goals); All: Szabolcs Huszti (9 goals)
- Highest home attendance: 49,000 vs. Schalke 04, vs. Bayern Munich, vs. Borussia Dortmund
- Lowest home attendance: 38,600 vs. Mainz 05
Home colours	Away colours	Third colours

The 2013–14 Hannover 96 season is the 118th season in the club's football history. In 2013–14 the club plays in the Bundesliga, the premier tier of German football. It is the club's eleventh season in this league, having been promoted from the 2. Bundesliga in 2002.

== Off-season ==
Hannover made five new signings over the summer period—Salif Sané from Nancy, Edgar Prib from Greuther Fürth, Leonardo Bittencourt from Borussia Dortmund, and youngsters Konstantin Fuhry from Stuttgart under-19's and Florian Ballas from Nürnberg II.

Hannover also lost Sérgio Pinto to Levante and both Mohammed Abdellaoue and Konstantin Rausch to Stuttgart. Additionally, Mario Eggimann left to join Union Berlin, Sofian Chahed left on a free transfer and Johan Djourou returned to Arsenal before signing on loan at rivals Hamburger SV.

During the winter break, rumours arose regarding the situation of manager Mirko Slomka due to the team's recent poor form, and on 27 December, he was fired.

As per the norm for German football teams, during the mid-season break, the teams have training camps in countries with warmer winter climates. This year, Hannover 96 will be in Belek, Turkey, between 9 January and 17 January, along with Hertha BSC and Borussia Mönchengladbach, prior to the Niedersaschen derby at Wolfsburg on 25 January.

On 31 December 2013, it was announced that Turkish manager Tayfun Korkut had become the new manager of Hannover on a contract running until 30 June 2016. He is the second Turkish coach to manage in the Bundesliga.

== Fixtures ==
=== Pre-season ===
27 June 2013	TSV Berenbostel (Germany)	0–14	(Germany) Hannover 96	Garbsen-Berenbostel
18:00			Bittencourt; Kadah; Prib; Schulz; Husztil; Nikçi; Hoffmann; Schlaudraff	Stadium: Sportanlage Philipp-Reis-Straße 2 Attendance: 2000

29 June 2013	TSV Krähenwinkel Kaltenweide (Germany)	1–2	(Germany) Hannover 96	Langenhagen
16:00	Linnemann 23'		Stindl 11'; Schlaudraff 53'	Stadium: Sportanlage Stucken-Mühlen-Weg 85; Attendance: 1600

30 June 2013	Schleswig 06 (Germany)	1–9	(Germany) Hannover 96	Schleswig
	Puttins 50'		Sobiech 15'; Avevor 25'; Schlaudraff 40', 45'; Kadah 55', 64'; Prib 78'; Nikçi 82'; Stindl 85'	Stadium: Alleestadion; Attendance: 2500

3 July 2013	ETSV Weiche Flensburg (Germany)	0–4	(Germany) Hannover 96	Flensburg
19:00			Bittencourt 4'; Hoffmann 15'; Stindl 56'; Sané 64'	Stadium: Manfred-Werner-Stadion; Attendance: 2200

6 July 2013	SV Ramlingen-Ehlershausen (Germany)	0–5	(Germany) Hannover 96	Burgdorf
17:00			Bittencourt 23', 31'; Hoffmann 45'; Nikçi 47'; Schlaudraff 50'	Stadium: Waldstadion; Attendance: 2600

9 July 2013	SV Quitt Ankum (Germany)	1–16	(Germany) Hannover 96	Ankum
18:30	Thale 64'		Sulejmani 4', 16', 25', 66', 89'; Stindl 11', 27', 29'; Huszti 13', 33', 34'; Schlaudraff 17', 32'; Nikçi 19', 54'	Stadium: Quitt-Stadion; Attendance: 1600

11 July 2013	TuS Celle FC (Germany)	0–8	(Germany) Hannover 96	Celle
18:30			Hoffmann 13'; Huszti 17'; Sobiech 24', 29'; Schlaudraff 34' unknown 62' (o.g.); Prib 70'; Sulejmani 83'	Stadium: Günther-Volker-Stadion; Attendance: 3000

14 July 2013	Hannover 96 (Germany)	0–3	(Netherlands) PSV	Hannover
16:00			Wijnaldum 13'; Locadia 57'; Strootman 76'	Stadium: HDI-Arena; Attendance: 13200; Referee: Peter Gagelmann

18 July 2013	West Bromwich Albion (England)	1–2	(Germany) Hannover 96	Gleisdorf
19:00	Rosenberg 42'		Diouf 28'; Dawson 81' (o.g.)	Stadium: Stadion des FC Gleisdorf 09; Attendance: 600

24 July 2013	Kasımpaşa (Turkey)	1–0	(Germany) Hannover 96	Stegersbach
19:00	Sam 45'			Stadium: Sportanlage in A-7551; Attendance: 100

29 July 2013	Hallescher FC (Germany)	0–1	(Germany) Hannover 96	Halle
19:30			Kadah 85'	Stadium: Erdgas Sportpark; Attendance: 3023

=== During the season ===
5 September 2013	OSC Hannover (Germany)	1–3	(Germany) Hannover 96	Hannover
18:00				Stadium: Oststadtstadion

10 October 2013	TSV Barsinghausen (Germany)	1–16	(Germany) Hannover 96	Barsinghausen
18:00				Stadium: August-Wenzel-Stadion

14 November 2013	Hannover 96 (Germany)	2–2	(Germany) St. Pauli	Celle
18:30	Thy 21'; Thorandt 38'		Prib 45'; Sulejmani 66'	Stadium: Günther-Volker-Stadion; Attendance: 1500

12 January 2014	Hannover 96 (Germany)	0–0	(Germany) Hertha BSC	Belek
16:00				Stadium: Hotel "Cornelia Diamond" football pitch Attendance: 350

16 January 2014	Hannover 96 (Germany)	1–2	(Turkey) Fenerbahçe	Aksu, Antalya
20:00	Diouf 27'		Webó 63'; Kuyt 90+2'	Stadium: Mardon Stadium; Attendance: 5,000

17 January 2014	Hannover 96 (Germany)	1–1	(Turkey) Çaykur Rizespor	Belek
15:00	Dierßen 12'		Cernat 90'	Stadium: Hotel "Kempinski" football pitch

2 February 2014	Hannover 96 (Germany)	2–2	(Germany) St. Pauli	Barsinghausen
12:00	Schlaudraff 78'; Prib 81'		Halstenberg 17'; Thy 23'	Stadium: August-Wenzel-Stadion

=== Post-season ===
19 May 2014 Friendly	TSV Havelse	3–3	Hannover 96	Garbsen
18:30	Hintzke 13'; El-Helwe 54'; Deppe 57'		Prib 59'; Sidra 68'; Sulejmani 83'	Stadium: Willhelm-Langrehr-Stadion

=== Bundesliga ===
==== League fixtures and results ====
10 August 2013 1	Hannover 96	2–0	VfL Wolfsburg	Hannover
15:30	Andreasen 17'; Huszti 84'	Report		Stadium: HDI-Arena; Attendance: 44,800; Referee: Dr. Felix Brych

17 August 2013 2	Borussia Mönchengladbach	3–0	Hannover 96	Mönchengladbach
18:30	Kruse 10'; Kramer 53'; Daems 66'	Report		Stadium: Borussia-Park; Attendance: 46089; Referee: Dr Jochen Drees (Münster/Sarmsheim)

24 August 2013 3	Hannover 96	2–1	Schalke 04	Hannover
15:30	Huszti 15'; Diouf 42'	Report	Szalai 54'	Stadium: HDI-Arena; Attendance: 49,000; Referee: Bastian Danker (Rostock)

31 August 2013 4	Hannover 96	4–1	Mainz 05	Hannover
15:30	Müller 12'	Report	Diouf 31'; Sobiech 37'; Ya Konan 80'; Prib 82'	Stadium: HDI-Arena; Attendance: 38,600; Referee: Guido Winkelmann

14 September 2013 5	Bayern Munich	2–0	Hannover 96	München
15:30	Mandžukić 51'; Ribéry 64'	Report		Stadium: Allianz Arena; Attendance: 71,000; Referee: Tobias Stieler (Offenbach)

21 September 2013 6	Hannover 96	2–1	Augsburg	Hannover
15:30	Sobiech 60'; Huszti 89' (pen.)	Report	Verhaegh 51' (pen.)	Stadium: HDI-Arena; Attendance: 39,200; Referee: Christian Dingert

28 September 2013 7	Bayer Leverkusen	2–0	Hannover 96	Leverkusen
15:30	Rolfes 23'; Sam 37'	Report		Stadium: BayArena; Attendance: 25198; Referee: Wolfgang Stark

4 October 2013 8	Hannover 96	1–1	Hertha BSC	Hannover
15:30	Schulz 23'	Report	Ronny 81'	Stadium: HDI-Arena; Attendance: 46,500; Referee: Günter Perl

19 October 2013 9	Borussia Dortmund	1–0	Hannover 96	Dortmund
15:30	Reus 4' (pen.)	Report		Stadium: Signal Iduna Park; Attendance: 80,645; Referee: Peter Gagelmann

26 October 2013 10	Hannover 96	1–4	1899 Hoffenheim	Hannover
15:30	Sané 56'	Report	Salihović 10' (pen.); Herdling 18'; Firmino 62', 64'	Stadium: HDI-Arena; Attendance: 45,000; Referee: Tobias Stieler

3 November 2013 11	Werder Bremen	3–2	Hannover 96	Bremen
17:30	Hunt 25' (pen.); Makiadi 38'; García 86'	Report	Huszti 20' (pen.); Sakai 41'	Stadium: Weserstadion; Attendance: 40,435; Referee: Thorsten Kinhöfer

8 November 2013 12	Hannover 96	0–0	Eintracht Braunschweig	Hannover
20:30		Report		Stadium: HDI-Arena; Attendance: 47,200; Referee: Knut Kircher

24 November 2013 13	Hamburg	3–1	Hannover 96	Hamburg
15:30	Badelj 31'; Beister 46'; Çalhanoğlu 84'	Report	Huszti 28'	Stadium: Imtech Arena; Attendance: 52,091; Referee: Marco Fritz

1 December 2013 14	Hannover 96	2–0	Eintracht Frankfurt	Hannover
15:30	Diouf 24'; Huszti 68'	Report		Stadium: HDI-Arena; Attendance: 40,700; Referee: Günter Perl

7 December 2013 15	VfB Stuttgart	4–2	Hannover 96	Stuttgart
15:30	Harnik 13'; Ibišević 33'; Traoré 52'; Rausch 84'	Report	Sobiech 28'; Sané 31'	Stadium: Mercedes-Benz Arena; Attendance: 47,630; Referee: Felix Brych

14 December 2013 16	Hannover 96	3–3	1. FC Nürnberg	Hannover
15:30	Bittencourt 60'; Diouf 87', 90+2'	Report	Hloušek 30'; Drmić 38'; Nilsson 41'	Stadium: HDI-Arena; Attendance: 38,100; Referee: Thorsten Kinhöfer

21 December 2013 17	Feiburg	2–1	Hannover 96	Freiburg
15:30	Mehmedi 25', 36'	Report	Bittencourt 90+3'	Stadium: Mage Solar Stadion; Attendance: 23,200; Referee: Dr. Jochen Drees

25 January 2014 18	VfL Wolfsburg	1–3	Hannover 96	Wolfsburg
15:30	Olić 35'	Report	Rudņevs 28'; Bittencourt 50', 72'	Stadium: Volkswagen Arena; Attendance: 28139; Referee: Markus Schmidt

1 February 2014 19	Hannover 96	3–1	Borussia Mönchengladbach	Hannover
15:30	Rudņevs 57'; Diouf 82', 90'	Report	Mlapa 84'	Stadium: HDI-Arena; Attendance: 47000; Referee: Bastian Dankert

8 February 2014 20	Schalke 04	2–0	Hannover 96	Gelsenkirchen
15:30	Farfán 39'; Meyer 44'	Report		Stadium: Veltins-Arena; Attendance: 61307; Referee: Christian Dingert

15 February 2014 21	Mainz 05	2–0	Hannover 96	Mainz
15:30	Mallı 51'; Choupo-Moting 90+3'	Report		Stadium: Coface Arena; Attendance: 26574; Referee: Manuel Gräfe

22 February 2014 22	Hannover 96	0–4	Bayern Munich	Hannover
15:30		Report	Müller 25', 59'; Thiago 34'; Mandžukić 66'	Stadium: HDI-Arena; Attendance: 49,000; Referee: Knut Kircher

1 March 2014 23	Augsburg	1–1	Hannover 96	Augsburg
15:30	Klavan 55'	Report	Diouf 21'	Stadium: SGL arena Attendance: 28,311; Referee: Tobias Stieler

8 March 2014 24	Hannover 96	1–1	Bayer Leverkusen	Hannover
15:30	Rudņevs 33'	Report	Castro 28'	Stadium: HDI-Arena; Attendance: 46,600; Referee: Felix Zwayer

15 March 2014 25	Hertha BSC	0–3	Hannover 96	Berlin
15:30		Report	Stindl 49'; Schlaudraff 57'; Huszti 90+1'	Stadium: Olympic Stadium; Attendance: 46,727; Referee: Guido Winkmann

22 March 2014 26	Hannover 96	0–3	Borussia Dortmund	Hannover
15:00		Report	Hummels 43'; Lewandowski 52'; Reus 90+1'	Stadium: HDI-Arena; Attendance: 49,000; Referee: Günter Perl

26 March 2014 27	1899 Hoffenheim	3–1	Hannover 96	Sinsheim
20:00	Polanski 13'; Modeste 51'; Rudy 90+3'	Report	Andreasen 10'	Stadium: Rhein-Neckar Arena; Attendance: 21,319; Referee: Peter Sippel

30 March 2014 28	Hannover 96	1–2	Werder Bremen	Hannover
17:30	Huszti 43'	Report	Di Santo 57'; Prödl 90'	Stadium: HDI-Arena; Attendance: 49,000; Referee: Markus Schmidt

6 April 2014 29	Eintracht Braunschweig	3–0	Hannover 96	Braunschweig
15:30	Kumbela 14'; Nielsen 21'; Hochscheidt 89'	Report		Stadium: Eintracht-Stadion; Attendance: 22,867; Referee: Peter Gagelmann

12 April 2014 30	Hannover 96	2–1	Hamburg	Hannover
15:30	Stindl 9'; Konan 86'	Report	Çalhanoğlu 48'	Stadium: HDI-Arena; Attendance: 49,000; Referee: Robert Hartmann

17 April 2014 31	Eintracht Frankfurt	2–3	Hannover 96	Frankfurt
20:30	Lanig 13'; Meier 68'	Report	Andreasen 2'; Stindl 20'; Ya Konan 29'	Stadium: Commerzbank-Arena; Attendance: 48100; Referee: Dr. Felix Brych

25 April 2014 32	Hannover 96	0–0	VfB Stuttgart	Hannover
20:30		Report		Stadium: HDI-Arena; Attendance: 49,000

3 May 2014 33	1. FC Nürnberg	0–2	Hannover 96	Nuremberg
15:30		Report	Huszti 5'; Schmiedebach 51'	Stadium: Stadion Nürnberg; Attendance: 46,104

10 May 2014 34	Hannover 96	3–2	Freiburg	Hannover
15:30	Huszti 45'; Rudņevs 65'; Prib 80'	Report	Schmid 50'; Zulechner 78'	Stadium: HDI-Arena; Attendance: 48,600

==== League table ====
Pos	Team	Pld	W	D	L	GF	GA	GD	Pts
8	FC Augsburg	34	15	7	12	47	47	0	52
9	1899 Hoffenheim	34	11	11	12	72	70	+2	44
10	Hannover 96	34	12	6	16	46	59	−13	42
11	Hertha BSC	34	11	8	15	40	48	−8	41
12	Werder Bremen	34	10	9	15	42	66	−24	39

Source: DFB
Rules for classification: 1) points; 2) goal difference; 3) number of goals scored.

=== DFB-Pokal ===
Hannover entered the 2013–14 DFB Pokal with an away game against Victoria Hamburg on Sunday 4 August 2013.

4 August 2013 1st Round	Victoria Hamburg	0–2	Hannover 96	Hamburg
14:30			Sobiech 69'; Huszti 90+3'	Stadium: Stadion Hoheluft; Attendance: 4784; Referee: Marcel Unger (Halle)

25 September 2013 2nd Round	Bayern Munich	4–1	Hannover 96	Munich
20:30	Müller 17', 64'; Pizarro 27'; Ribéry 78'		Ya Konan 37'	Stadium: Allianz Arena; Attendance: 66,000; Referee: Jochen Drees

== Squad ==
=== Squad information ===
Squad Season 2013–14
No.	Player	Nat.	Birthdate	at H96 since	previous club
Goalkeepers
1	Ron-Robert Zieler	(Germany)	12 Feb 1989	2010	Manchester United
14	Markus Miller	(Germany)	8 Apr 1982	2010	Karlsruhe
21	Konstantin Fuhry	(Germany)	8 Apr 1994	2013	Stuttgart
Defenders
3	Karim Haggui	(Tunisia)	20 Jan 1984	2009	Bayer Leverkusen
4	Hiroki Sakai	(Japan)	12 Apr 1990	2012	Kashiwa Reysol
5	Salif Sane	(Senegal)	25 Aug 1990	2013	Nancy
6	Steve Cherundolo	(United States)	19 Feb 1979	1999	University of Portland
18	Sébastien Pocognoli	(Belgium)	1 Aug 1987	2013	Standard Liège
19	Christian Schulz	(Germany)	1 Apr 1983	2007	Werder Bremen
20	Felipe	(Brazil)	15 May 1987	2012	Standard Liège
22	František Rajtoral	(Czech Republic)	12 Mar 1986	2014	Viktoria Plzeň (loan)
23	Christopher Avevor	(Germany)	11 Feb 1992	2013	St. Pauli
24	Christian Pander	(Germany)	28 Aug 1983	2011	Schalke 04
25	Marcelo	(Brazil)	20 May 1987	2013	PSV
30	Florian Ballas	(Germany)	8 Jan 1993	2013	Nürnberg
33	Yannik Schulze	(Germany)	5 Feb 1995	2008	TSV Isernhagen
35	Ali Gökdemir	(Azerbaijan)	17 Sep 1991	2013	Stuttgart
Midfielders
2	Leon Andreasen	(Denmark)	23 Apr 1983	2009	Fulham
7	Edgar Prib	(Germany)	15 Dec 1989	2013	Greuther Fürth
8	Manuel Schmiedebach	(Germany)	5 Dec 1988	2008	Hertha BSC
10	Szabolcs Huszti	(Hungary)	18 Apr 1983	2012	Zenit Saint Petersburg
15	André Hoffmann	(Germany)	28 Feb 1993	2013	Duisburg
16	França	(Brazil)	21 Apr 1991	2013	Criciúma
22	Adrian Nikçi	(Switzerland)	10 Nov 1989	2012	Zürich
28	Lars Stindl	(Germany)	26 Aug 1988	2010	Karlsruhe
32	Leonardo Bittencourt	(Germany)	19 Dec 1993	2013	Borussia Dortmund
38	Valmir Sulejmani	(Albania)	1 Feb 1996	2013	Hannover 96 II
Forwards
9	Artur Sobiech	(Poland)	12 Jun 1990	2011	Polonia Warsaw
11	Didier Ya Konan	(Ivory Coast)	22 May 1984	2009	Rosenborg
13	Jan Schlaudraff	(Germany)	18 Jul 1983	2008	Bayern Munich
16	Artjoms Rudņevs	(Latvia)	13 Jan 1988	2014	Hamburg (loan)
27	Deniz Kadah	(Germany)	2 Mar 1986	2012	Lübeck
39	Mame Biram Diouf	(Senegal)	16 Dec 1987	2012	Manchester United
40	Almir Kasumović	(Bosnia and Herzegovina)	3 Jun 1994	2005	Sparta Langenhagen
Last updated: 12 April 2014

=== Season statistics ===
As of 12 April 2013

No.	Pos	Nat	Player	Total		Bundesliga		DFB-Pokal	
No.	Pos	Nat	Player	Apps	Goals	Apps	Goals	Apps	Goals
Goalkeepers
1	GK	(Germany) GER	Ron-Robert Zieler	33	0	31	0	2	0
14	GK	(Germany) GER	Markus Miller	0	0	0	0	0	0
21	GK	(Germany) GER	Konstantin Fuhry	0	0	0	0	0	0
Defenders
3	DF	(Tunisia) TUN	Karim Haggui	4	0	3	0	1	0
4	DF	(Japan) JPN	Hiroki Sakai	27	1	25	1	2	0
5	DF	(Senegal) SEN	Salif Sane	20	2	19	2	1	0
6	DF	(United States) USA	Steve Cherundolo	2	0	2	0	0	0
18	DF	(Belgium) BEL	Sébastien Pocognoli	21	0	20	0	1	0
19	DF	(Germany) GER	Christian Schulz	25	1	24	1	1	0
20	DF	(Brazil) BRA	Felipe	0	0	0	0	0	0
22	DF	(Czech Republic) CZE	František Rajtoral	5	0	5	0	0	0
23	DF	(Germany) GER	Christopher Avevor	0	0	0	0	0	0
24	DF	(Germany) GER	Christian Pander	6	0	5	0	1	0
25	DF	(Brazil) BRA	Marcelo	23	0	22	0	1	0
30	DF	(Germany) GER	Florian Ballas	0	0	0	0	0	0
33	DF	(Germany) GER	Yannik Schulze	0	0	0	0	0	0
35	DF	(Azerbaijan) AZE	Ali Gökdemir	0	0	0	0	0	0
Midfielders
2	MF	(Denmark) DEN	Leon Andreasen	30	3	28	3	2	0
7	MF	(Germany) GER	Edgar Prib	27	1	26	1	1	0
8	MF	(Germany) GER	Manuel Schmiedebach	23	0	21	0	2	0
10	MF	(Hungary) HUN	Szabolcs Huszti	29	9	27	8	2	1
15	MF	(Germany) GER	André Hoffmann	23	0	22	0	1	0
16	MF	(Brazil) BRA	França	0	0	0	0	0	0
22	MF	(Switzerland) SUI	Adrian Nikçi	0	0	0	0	0	0
28	MF	(Germany) GER	Lars Stindl	30	3	28	3	2	0
32	MF	(Germany) GER	Leonardo Bittencourt	31	4	29	4	2	0
38	MF	(Albania) ALB	Valmir Sulejmani	4	0	4	0	0	0
Forwards
9	FW	(Poland) POL	Artur Sobiech	18	4	17	3	1	1
11	FW	(Ivory Coast) CIV	Didier Ya Konan	15	4	14	3	1	1
13	FW	(Germany) GER	Jan Schlaudraff	21	1	19	1	2	0
16	FW	(Latvia) LAT	Artjoms Rudņevs	12	3	12	3	0	0
27	FW	(Germany) GER	Deniz Kadah	4	0	3	0	1	0
39	FW	(Senegal) SEN	Mame Biram Diouf	24	8	23	8	1	0
40	FW	(Bosnia and Herzegovina) BIH	Almir Kasumović	0	0	0	0	0	0

==== Results summary ====
Overall								Home						Away					
Pld	W	D	L	GF	GA	GD	Pts	W	D	L	GF	GA	GD	W	D	L	GF	GA	GD
31	10	5	16	38	60	−22	35	7	4	4	24	23	+1	3	1	12	14	37	−23

Last updated: 18 April 2014.

==== Points breakdown ====
Points at home: 25
Points away from home: 10

Points against promoted teams: 5

6 points: Wolfsburg, Eintracht Frankfurt
4 points: vs. Hertha BSC, Augsburg
3 points: vs. Schalke 04, Mainz 05, Borussia Mönchengladbach, Hamburg
2 points:
1 point: vs. Eintracht Braunschweig, Nürnberg, Bayer Leverkusen
0 points: vs. Bayern Munich, Borussia Dortmund, 1899 Hoffenheim, Werder Bremen, Stuttgart, Freiburg

==== Biggest & smallest ====
Biggest home win: 4 – 1 vs. 1. Mainz 05, 31 August 2013
Biggest home defeat: 0 – 4 vs. Bayern Munich, 23 February 2014
Biggest away win: 1 – 3 vs. Wolfsburg, 25 January 2014
Biggest away defeat: 3 – 0 vs. Borussia Mönchengladbach, 17 August 2013

Biggest home attendance: 49,000 vs. Schalke 04, 24 August 2013
Smallest home attendance: 38,600 vs. Mainz 05, 31 August 2013
Biggest away attendance: 80,645 vs. Borussia Dortmund, 19 October 2013
Smallest away attendance: 4,787 vs. Victoria Hamburg, 4 August 2013

==== Results by match ====
Round	1	2	3	4	5	6	7	8	9	10	11	12	13	14	15	16	17	18	19	20	21	22	23	24	25	26	27	28	29	30	31	32	33	34
Ground	H	A	H	H	A	H	A	H	A	H	A	H	A	H	A	H	A	A	H	A	A	H	A	H	A	H	A	H	A	H	A	H	A	H
Result	W	L	W	W	L	W	L	D	L	L	L	D	L	W	L	D	L	W	W	L	L	L	D	D	W	L	L	L	L	W	W	D	W	W
Position	5	10	7	3	4	4	4	5	7	10	11	11	13	9	12	12	13	10	10	10	11	11	11	12	11	11	12	13	13	13	14	13	11	10

Updated to match(es) played on 10 May 2014. Source:
A = Away; H = Home; W = Win; D = Draw; L = Loss

== Goal scorers ==
All competitions

Scorer	Goals
(Hungary) Szabolcs Huszti	9
(Senegal) Mame Biram Diouf	8
(Poland) Artur Sobiech	4
(Germany) Leonardo Bittencourt	4
(Ivory Coast) Didier Ya Konan	4
(Latvia) Artjoms Rudņevs	3
(Germany) Lars Stindl	3
(Senegal) Salif Sané	2
(Denmark) Leon Andreasen	2
(Germany) Jan Schlaudraff	1
(Germany) Christian Schulz	1
(Japan) Hiroki Sakai	1
(Germany) Edgar Prib	1

2013–14 Bundesliga

Scorer	Goals
(Senegal) Mame Biram Diouf	8
(Hungary) Szabolcs Huszti	8
(Germany) Leonardo Bittencourt	4
(Ivory Coast) Didier Ya Konan	3
(Latvia) Artjoms Rudņevs	3
(Poland) Artur Sobiech	3
(Germany) Lars Stindl	3
(Senegal) Salif Sané	2
(Denmark) Leon Andreasen	2
(Germany) Jan Schlaudraff	1
(Germany) Christian Schulz	1
(Japan) Hiroki Sakai	1
(Germany) Edgar Prib	1

2013–14 DFB-Pokal

Scorer	Goals
(Poland) Artur Sobiech	1
(Hungary) Szabolcs Huszti	1
(Ivory Coast) Didier Ya Konan	1

Last updated: 18 April 2014
