= Sobiech =

Sobiech (Polish pronunciation: [ˈsɔbʲɛx]) is a surname of Polish origin. It may refer to:

- Artur Sobiech (born 1990), Polish footballer
- Bogna Sobiech (born 1990), Polish handball player
- Jörg Sobiech (born 1969), German footballer
- Lasse Sobiech (born 1991), German footballer
- Zach Sobiech (1995–2013), American pop singer
