= Dybul =

Dybul is a Polish surname. Notable people with the surname include:

- Bogna Dybul (born 1990), Polish handball player
- Mark R. Dybul (born 1963), American diplomat and physician
