= Waldemar Anton =

German footballer (born 1996)

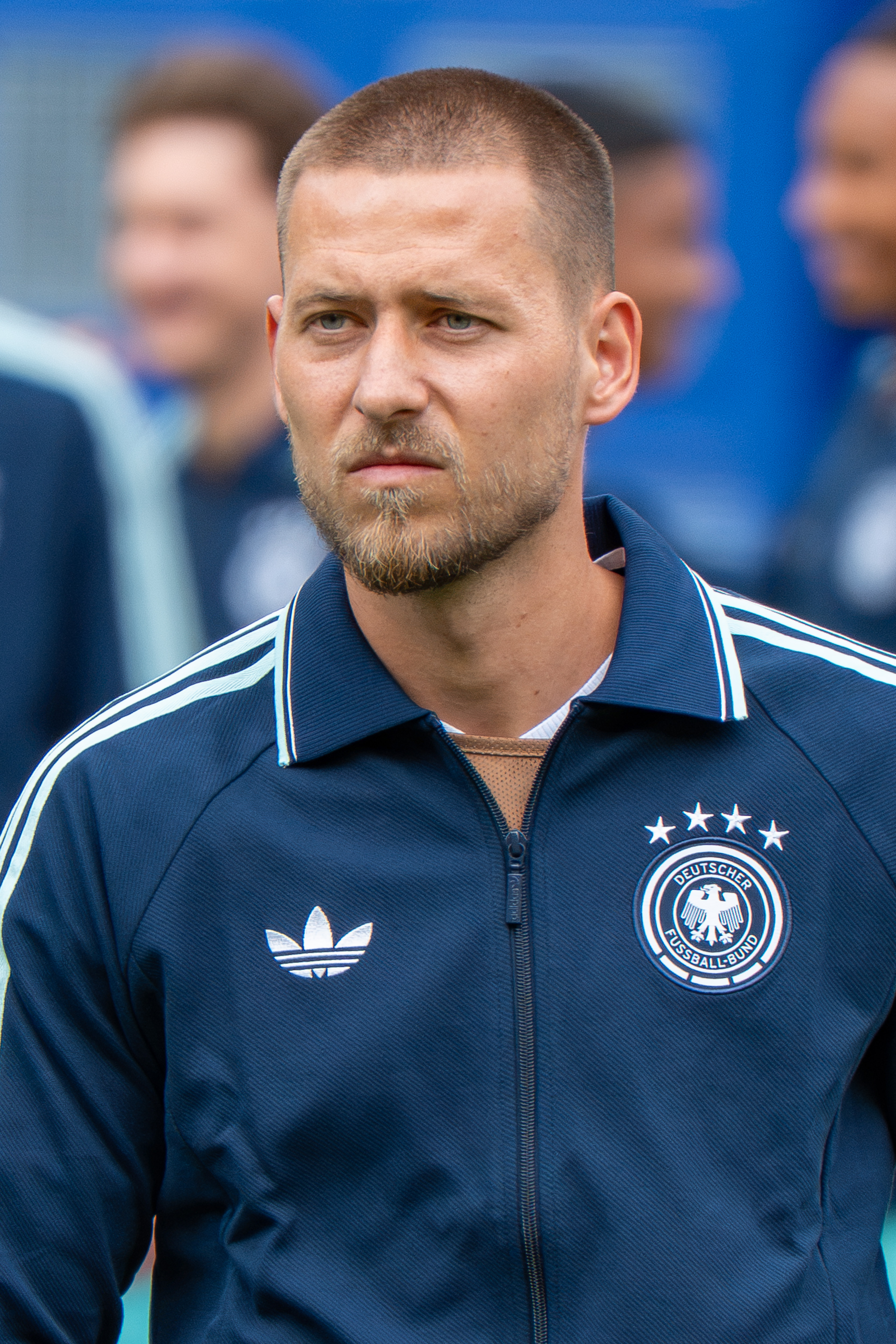
- Anton with Germany in 2026

Personal information
- Full name: Waldemar Anton
- Birth name: Vladimir Anton
- Date of birth: 20 July 1996 (age 30)
- Place of birth: Olmaliq, Uzbekistan
- Height: 1.89 m (6 ft 2 in)
- Position: Centre-back

Team information
- Current team: Borussia Dortmund
- Number: 3

Youth career
- –2007: Mühlenberger SV
- 2007–2015: Hannover 96

Senior career*
Years	Team	Apps	(Gls)
2015–2016	Hannover 96 II	11	(1)
2016–2020	Hannover 96	130	(6)
2020–2024	VfB Stuttgart	127	(3)
2024–	Borussia Dortmund	66	(4)

International career^{‡}
2016–2019	Germany U21	11	(0)
2024–	Germany	17	(0)
Medal record
Men's football
Representing Germany
UEFA European Under-21 Championship
Winner	Poland 2017
Runner-up	2019 Italy–San Marino
- * Club domestic league appearances and goals as of 31 October 2026 ‡ National team caps and goals as of 08:38, 5 October 2026 (UTC)

Waldemar Anton (German pronunciation: [ˈvaldəmaːʁ ˈantɔn]; born Vladimir Anton; 20 July 1996) is a German professional footballer who plays as a centre-back for Bundesliga club Borussia Dortmund and the Germany national team.

== Club career ==
=== Hannover 96 ===
Anton played eleven matches for Hannover 96 II and scored one goal. Since Hannover 96 were in relegation, Anton and Mike-Steven Bähre were signed to professional contracts to help the club.

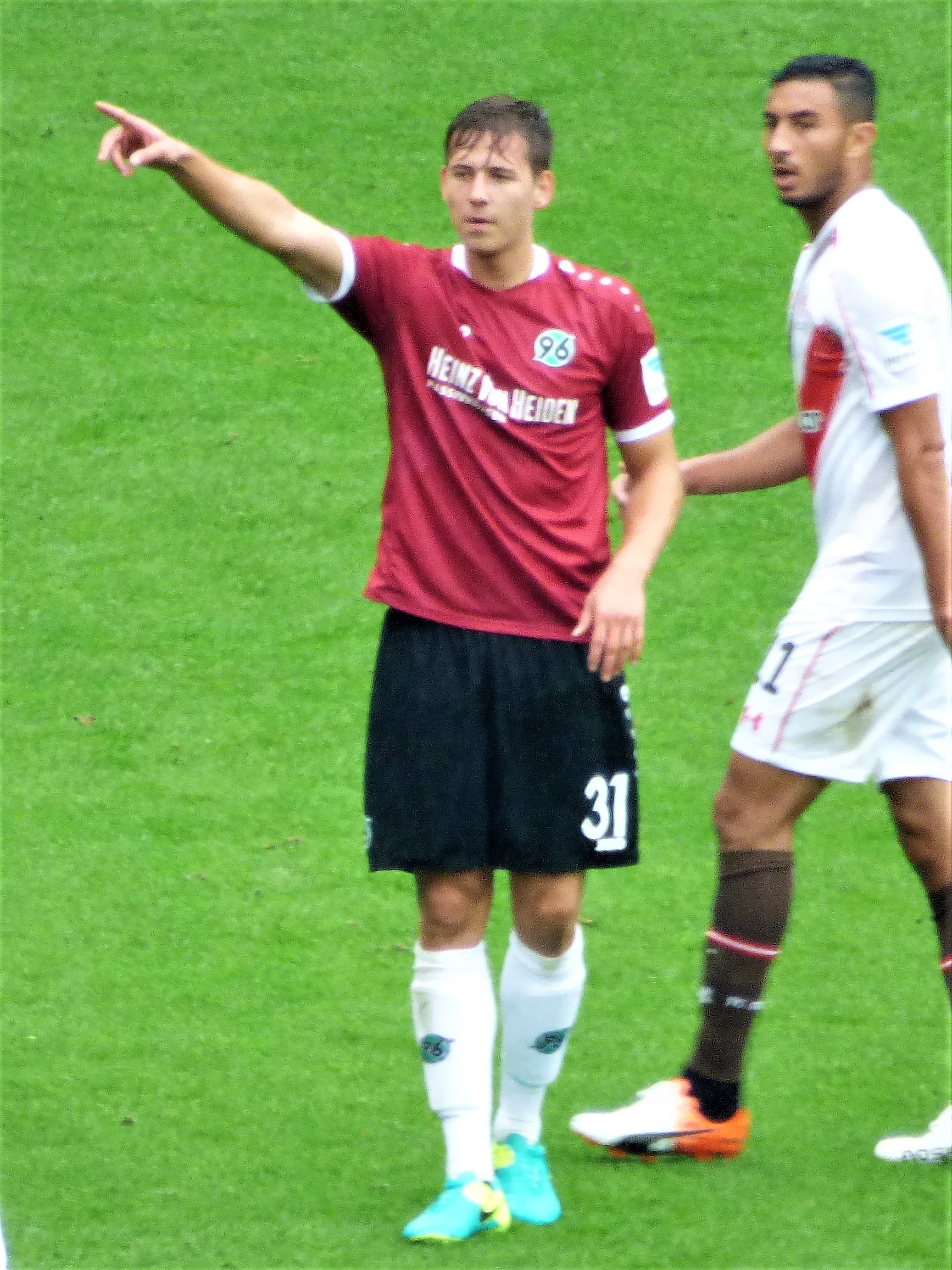
Anton with Hannover 96 in 2016

During the 2015–16 season, Anton made two appearances for Hannover 96, playing in a 2–1 win against VfB Stuttgart on 27 February 2016 and a 1–0 loss against Eintracht Frankfurt on 19 March 2016. His first Bundesliga goal was against Borussia Mönchengladbach on 15 April 2016.

=== VfB Stuttgart ===
On 28 July 2020, Anton transferred to VfB Stuttgart on a four-year deal. On 5 November 2021, he extended his contract until 2025.

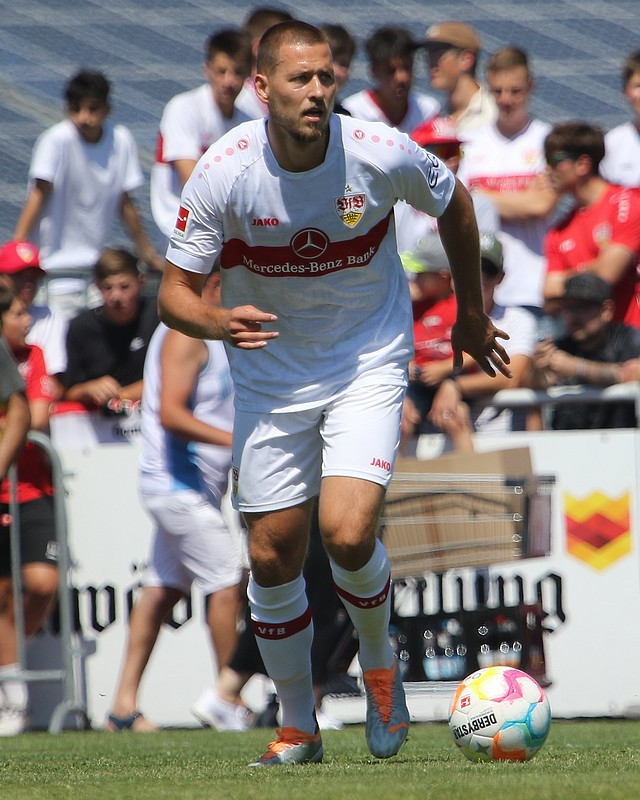
Anton with VfB Stuttgart in 2022

Anton became the team captain of VfB Stuttgart in August 2023 and extended his contract until 2027 on 14 January 2024. On 4 May 2024, the final matchday of the Bundesliga season, Anton would help his side win 3–1 over Bayern Munich, thus finishing Bundesliga runner-up behind champions Bayer Leverkusen.

=== Borussia Dortmund ===
On 8 July 2024, Anton joined fellow Bundesliga club Borussia Dortmund, signing a four-year contract, for a reported transfer fee of €22.5m, as a replacement for Mats Hummels, who left the club in the same summer. The transfer has caused major controversies among Stuttgart supporters, since Anton declared his loyalty towards the club four months prior to his move.

"[...] I hadn't originally planned on changing clubs – but then Borussia Dortmund came along. A top club that just reached the Champions League final. That shows the potential this club has [...]."

— Waldemar Anton on joining Borussia Dortmund

On 17 August 2024, Anton made his Dortmund debut in the first round of the DFB-Pokal against Phönix Lübeck, scoring three minutes into the match, and thus his first goal. On 18 September, he'd celebrate his European debut coming on as a substitute in a 3–0 away victory over Club Brugge, on the first matchday of the Champions League league phase. On 1 October, he'd feature in the starting line-up in the Champions League for the first time, in a 7–1 home win over Celtic Glasgow. On 8 February 2025, Anton scored an own goal for his former club VfB Stuttgart in a 2–1 loss. On 12 April, he scored his first Bundesliga goal for Dortmund away in Munich, to tie the game 2–2 and secure a point for his team. Three days later, he'd play full 90 minutes in a 3–1 home victory over FC Barcelona, in the quarter-final of the Champions League, though his side was eliminated. On 26 April, he'd score the winning goal for Dortmund in the sixth minute of extra time in a 3–2 away victory over Hoffenheim, climbing up to the sixth place of the league table, making a crucial step towards Champions League qualification for the following season. On the last matchday, he would help his team win 3–0 against Kiel and qualify for the Champions League.

In the first matchday of the following Bundesliga season, he'd score a goal in a 3–3 draw over St. Pauli. On 5 November 2025, he'd score Dortmund's only goal in a 1–4 away loss to Manchester City, marking Dortmund's first defeat of the Champions League season. On 4 April 2026, Dortmund would win 2–0 against VfB Stuttgart away, marking Anton's first victory with Dortmund over his ex-club after three winless matches in a row. With Dortmund, he'd finish Bundesliga runner-up, thus qualifying for the Champions League and the Supercup, which his side lost 2–1 on 22 August against Bayern.

On 31 October, he played his 100th match in all competitions for Borussia Dortmund in a 2–2 away draw against Bayern Munich.

== International career ==
Anton was eligible to play for Germany, Russia and Uzbekistan. He was a youth international for Germany. He won the UEFA Under-21 Championship in 2017 and was a runner-up in 2019.

In March 2024, he was called up for the Germany national team ahead of the friendly matches against France and the Netherlands. He made his debut on 23 March 2024 in a 2–0 away win over France getting subbed on for Toni Kroos.

Anton was named in Germany's squad for UEFA Euro 2024, making his tournament debut in the round of 16 against Denmark, a 2–0 win in Dortmund. In the quarter-final against Spain, he'd be subbed on for Kai Havertz and play the full extra time, a 2–1 loss. After the Euros, he featured in Germany's 2024–25 UEFA Nations League campaign, reaching the finals and finishing fourth place. Later, he successfully qualified with Germany for the 2026 FIFA World Cup, featuring in four out of their six qualifying matches and would be called up for the final tournament squad. He made his World Cup debut on 14 June 2026, replacing Joshua Kimmich as a late substitute in a 7–1 win over Curaçao, in Germany's opening match. He featured in the round of 32 match against Paraguay, which saw his side knocked out on penalties after a 1–1 draw, with Germany’s defeat sealed before Anton even had the chance to take his spot-kick.

== Personal life ==
A Spätaussiedler, Anton was born in the ex-Soviet region of Olmaliq, Uzbekistan, to Russia-German parents and moved to Germany at the age of two. His father is from Ekaterinburg, Russia, and his mother is Volga German. When in Germany, his parents legally changed his birth name Vladimir to its German equivalent Waldemar due to assimilation reasons. He is Christian.

== Career statistics ==
=== Club ===
As of match played 31 October 2026

Appearances and goals by club, season and competition
Club	Season	League			DFB-Pokal		Europe		Other		Total	
Club	Season	Division	Apps	Goals	Apps	Goals	Apps	Goals	Apps	Goals	Apps	Goals
Hannover 96 II	2015–16	Regionalliga Nord	11	1	—		—		—		11	1
Hannover 96	2015–16	Bundesliga	8	1	0	0	—		—		8	1
Hannover 96	2016–17	2. Bundesliga	31	2	2	0	—		—		33	2
Hannover 96	2017–18	Bundesliga	27	1	2	0	—		—		29	1
Hannover 96	2018–19	Bundesliga	34	1	2	0	—		—		36	1
Hannover 96	2019–20	2. Bundesliga	30	0	1	0	—		—		31	0
Hannover 96	Total		130	5	7	0	—		—		137	5
VfB Stuttgart	2020–21	Bundesliga	31	0	3	0	—		—		21	0
VfB Stuttgart	2021–22	Bundesliga	29	2	2	0	—		—		31	2
VfB Stuttgart	2022–23	Bundesliga	34	1	4	0	—		2 (Note: Appearances in Bundesliga relegation play-offs)	0	40	1
VfB Stuttgart	2023–24	Bundesliga	33	0	4	1	—		—		37	1
VfB Stuttgart	Total		127	3	13	1	—		2	0	129	4
Borussia Dortmund	2024–25	Bundesliga	26	2	1	1	10 (Note: Appearances in UEFA Champions League)	0	5 (Note: Appearances in FIFA Club World Cup)	0	42	3
Borussia Dortmund	2025–26	Bundesliga	32	2	3	0	9	1	—		44	3
Borussia Dortmund	2026–27	Bundesliga	8	0	2	0	3	0	1 (Note: Appearance in Franz Beckenbauer Supercup)	0	14	0
Borussia Dortmund	Total		66	4	6	1	22	1	6	0	100	6
Career total			321	13	26	2	22	1	8	0	377	16

=== International ===
As of match played 4 October 2026

Appearances and goals by national team and year
National team	Year	Apps	Goals
Germany	2024	7	0
Germany	2025	5	0
Germany	2026	5	0
Total		17	0

== Honours ==
Germany U21

- UEFA European Under-21 Championship: 2017; runner-up: 2019

VfB Stuttgart

- Bundesliga runner-up: 2023–24

Individual

- Bundesliga Team of the Season: 2023–24
- VDV Bundesliga Team of the Season: 2023–24
