= Benjamin Hübner =

German footballer

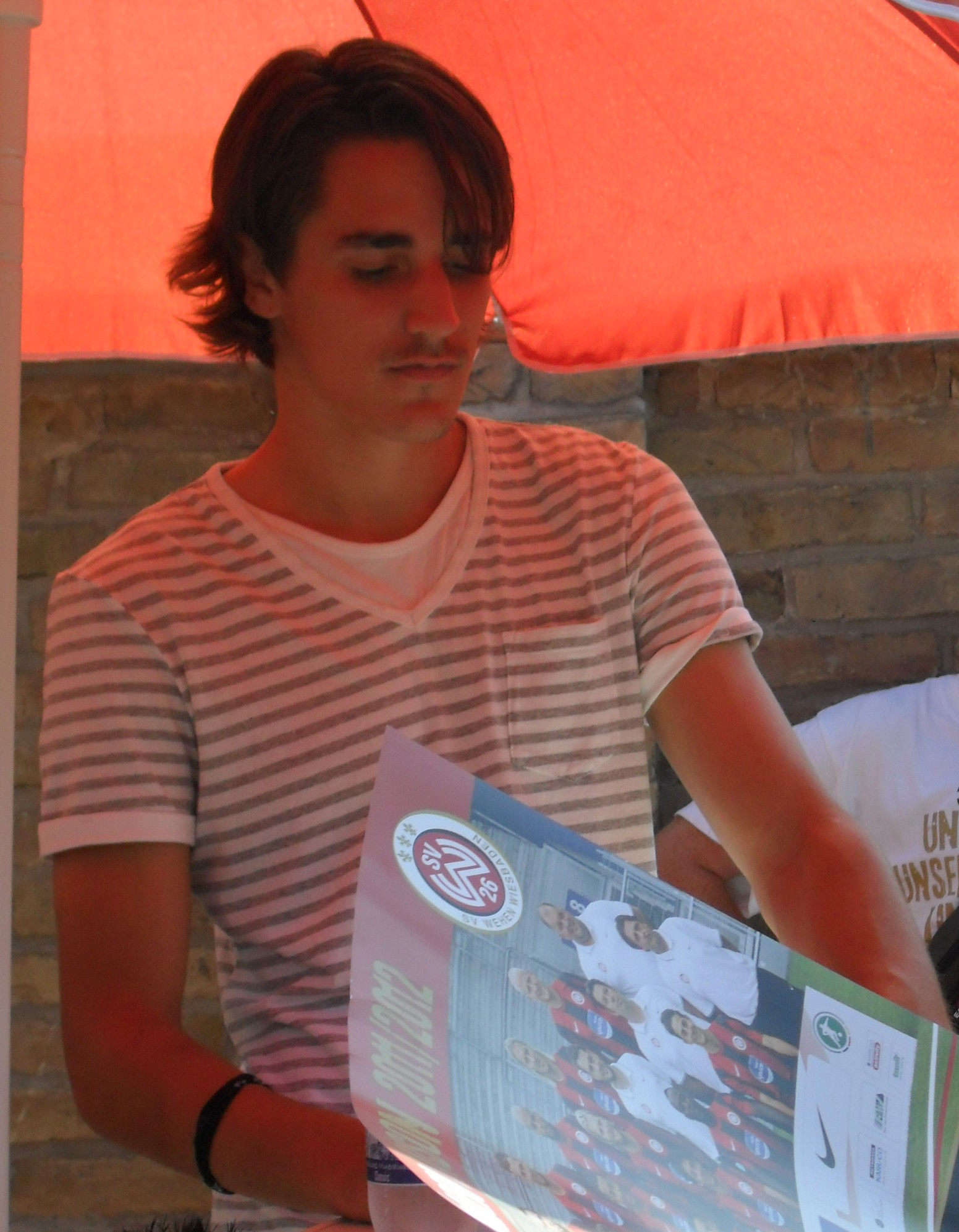
- Benjamin Hübner in 2011

Personal information
- Date of birth: 4 July 1989 (age 37)
- Place of birth: Wiesbaden, West Germany
- Height: 1.93 m (6 ft 4 in)
- Position: Centre-back

Youth career
- 1993–2007: Wehen Wiesbaden

Senior career*
Years	Team	Apps	(Gls)
2007–2012	Wehen Wiesbaden	105	(4)
2008–2011	Wehen Wiesbaden II	21	(2)
2012–2014	VfR Aalen	54	(4)
2014–2016	FC Ingolstadt	61	(3)
2016–2022	TSG Hoffenheim	92	(7)
Total		333	(20)
- * Club domestic league appearances and goals as of 16:20, 6 December 2022 (UTC)

Benjamin Hübner (born 4 July 1989) is a German former professional footballer who played as a centre-back.

== Career ==
=== Early career ===
Born in Wiesbaden, Hübner made his professional debut in the 2. Bundesliga for Wehen Wiesbaden on 18 May 2008 when he came on as a substitute for Benjamin Siegert in the 90th minute in a game against Freiburg.

=== Ingolstadt ===
On 6 May 2014, he signed a three-year contract with FC Ingolstadt.

=== TSG Hoffenheim ===
On 18 May 2016, he signed a contract with TSG Hoffenheim.

=== Retirement ===
On 6 December 2022, Hübner announced his retirement from football after persistent injuries had resulted in him playing just 478 minutes in two-and-a-half years.

== Personal life ==
His brothers Christopher and Florian are professional footballers and his father Bruno is director of sports at Eintracht Frankfurt.

== Career statistics ==
Appearances and goals by club, season and competition
Club	Season	League			DFB-Pokal		Continental		Total	
Club	Season	Division	Apps	Goals	Apps	Goals	Apps	Goals	Apps	Goals
Wehen Wiesbaden	2007–08	2. Bundesliga	1	0	0	0	—		1	0
Wehen Wiesbaden	2008–09	2. Bundesliga	17	0	1	0	—		18	0
Wehen Wiesbaden	2009–10	3. Liga	34	1	1	0	—		35	1
Wehen Wiesbaden	2010–11	3. Liga	24	0	—		—		24	0
Wehen Wiesbaden	2011–12	3. Liga	31	2	1	0	—		32	2
Wehen Wiesbaden	Total		107	3	3	0	0	0	110	3
Wehen Wiesbaden II	2007–08	Oberliga Hessen	7	0	—		—		7	0
Wehen Wiesbaden II	2008–09	Regionalliga Süd	16	2	—		—		16	2
Wehen Wiesbaden II	2009–10	Regionalliga Süd	4	0	—		—		4	0
Wehen Wiesbaden II	2010–11	Regionalliga Süd	4	0	—		—		4	0
Wehen Wiesbaden II	Total		31	2	0	0	0	0	31	2
VfR Aalen	2012–13	2. Bundesliga	25	2	2	0	—		27	2
VfR Aalen	2013–14	2. Bundesliga	32	2	2	0	—		34	2
VfR Aalen	Total		57	4	4	0	0	0	61	4
FC Ingolstadt	2014–15	2. Bundesliga	31	2	1	0	—		32	2
FC Ingolstadt	2015–16	Bundesliga	30	1	1	0	—		31	1
FC Ingolstadt	Total		61	3	2	0	0	0	63	3
TSG Hoffenheim	2016–17	Bundesliga	25	2	1	1	—		26	3
TSG Hoffenheim	2017–18	Bundesliga	27	3	1	0	4 (Note: Appearances in the UEFA Champions League and UEFA Europa League)	1	32	4
TSG Hoffenheim	2018–19	Bundesliga	10	0	0	0	1 (Note: Appearances in the UEFA Champions League)	0	11	0
TSG Hoffenheim	2019–20	Bundesliga	25	1	2	0	—		27	1
TSG Hoffenheim	2020–21	Bundesliga	0	0	0	0	0	0	0	0
TSG Hoffenheim	2021–22	Bundesliga	5	1	1	0	0	0	6	1
TSG Hoffenheim	2022–23	Bundesliga	0	0	1	0	0	0	1	0
TSG Hoffenheim	Total		92	7	6	1	5	1	103	9
Career total			348	19	15	1	5	1	368	21

== Honours ==
FC Ingolstadt

- 2. Bundesliga: 2014–15
