= Florian Hübner =

German footballer

Personal information
- Date of birth: 1 March 1991 (age 35)
- Place of birth: Wiesbaden, Germany
- Height: 1.91 m (6 ft 3 in)
- Position: Centre back

Team information
- Current team: SV Wehen Wiesbaden
- Number: 19

Youth career
- –2009: SV Wehen Wiesbaden

Senior career*
Years	Team	Apps	(Gls)
2009–2011	SV Wehen Wiesbaden II	23	(1)
2009–2011	SV Wehen Wiesbaden	23	(0)
2011–2013	Borussia Dortmund II	48	(4)
2013–2016	SV Sandhausen	65	(6)
2016–2018	Hannover 96	24	(1)
2018–2021	Union Berlin	45	(2)
2021–2024	1. FC Nürnberg	38	(1)
2024–	SV Wehen Wiesbaden	28	(1)

International career
2010–2011	Germany U20	2	(0)
- * Club domestic league appearances and goals as of 24 May 2026

Florian Hübner (born 1 March 1991) is a German professional footballer who plays as a centre back for 3. Liga club SV Wehen Wiesbaden.

== Career ==
=== SV Wehen Wiesbaden ===
Hübner began his career in the youth system of SV Wehen Wiesbaden and was promoted to the first team in the 2009–10 season.

=== Borussia Dortmund II ===
On 18 May 2011, Hübner signed a two-year contract and moved to Borussia Dortmund II on a free transfer. Hübner was promoted to team captain following the transfer of Christian Eggert to 1. FC Saarbrücken at the start of the 2011–12 season. He missed the second half of the 2011–12 season with a syndesmosis injury.

=== SV Sandhausen ===
In 2013, he joined SV Sandhausen.

=== Hannover 96 ===
He signed for Hannover 96 for the 2016–17 season.

=== Union Berlin ===
In June 2018, Hübner transferred to Union Berlin, signing a contract there until 2020.

=== 1. FC Nürnberg ===
After three years Hübner left 1. FC Nürnberg.

=== Return to Wiesbaden ===
On 29 July 2024, Hübner returned to his first club SV Wehen Wiesbaden.

== Personal life ==
His brothers Christopher and Benjamin are professional footballers and his father Bruno is director of sports at Eintracht Frankfurt.

== Career statistics ==
As of 1 July 2021

Appearances and goals by club, season and competition
Club	Season	League			Cup		Other		Total	
Club	Season	League	Apps	Goals	Apps	Goals	Apps	Goals	Apps	Goals
SV Wehen Wiesbaden II	2008–09	Regionalliga Süd	4	0	—		–		4	0
SV Wehen Wiesbaden II	2009–10	Regionalliga Süd	14	0	—		–		14	0
SV Wehen Wiesbaden II	2010–11	Regionalliga Süd	5	1	—		–		5	1
SV Wehen Wiesbaden II	Total		23	1	0	0	0	0	23	1
SV Wehen Wiesbaden	2009–10	3. Liga	6	0	0	0	–		6	0
SV Wehen Wiesbaden	2010–11	3. Liga	17	0	0	0	–		17	0
SV Wehen Wiesbaden	Total		23	0	0	0	0	0	23	0
Borussia Dortmund II	2011–12	Regionalliga West	17	3	—		–		17	3
Borussia Dortmund II	2012–13	3. Liga	31	1	—		–		31	1
Borussia Dortmund II	Total		48	4	0	0	0	0	48	4
SV Sandhausen	2013–14	2. Bundesliga	17	2	1	0	–		18	2
SV Sandhausen	2014–15	2. Bundesliga	22	1	0	0	–		22	1
SV Sandhausen	2015–16	2. Bundesliga	26	3	2	0	–		28	3
SV Sandhausen	Total		65	6	3	0	0	0	68	6
Hannover 96	2016–17	2. Bundesliga	15	1	0	0	–		15	1
Hannover 96	2017–18	Bundesliga	9	0	0	0	–		9	0
Hannover 96	Total		24	1	0	0	0	0	24	1
Union Berlin	2018–19	2. Bundesliga	28	2	2	0	1	0	31	2
Union Berlin	2019–20	Bundesliga	11	0	0	0	–		11	0
Union Berlin	2020–21	Bundesliga	6	0	0	0	–		6	0
Union Berlin	Total		45	2	2	0	1	0	48	2
Career total			228	14	5	0	1	0	234	14
