= Felix Klaus =

German footballer

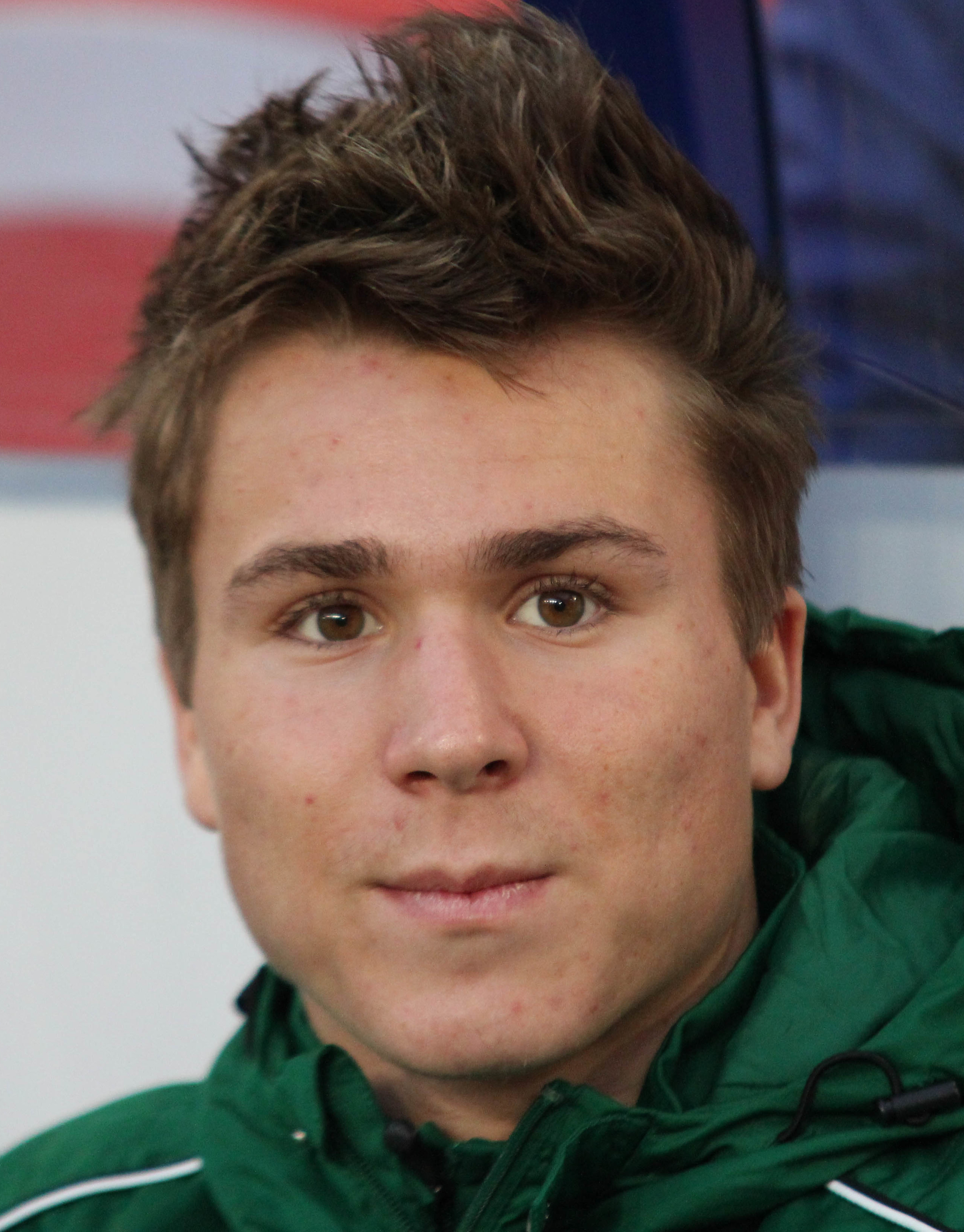
- Klaus with Greuther Fürth in 2012

Personal information
- Date of birth: 13 September 1992 (age 34)
- Place of birth: Osnabrück, Germany
- Height: 1.80 m (5 ft 11 in)
- Position: Winger

Team information
- Current team: Greuther Fürth
- Number: 30

Youth career
- SV Bösensell
- 1997–2004: SC Weismain
- 2004–2005: SCW Obermain
- 2005–2006: 1. FC Lichtenfels
- 2006–2010: Greuther Fürth

Senior career*
Years	Team	Apps	(Gls)
2009–2012	Greuther Fürth II	28	(9)
2010–2013	Greuther Fürth	62	(6)
2013	SC Freiburg II	5	(0)
2013–2015	SC Freiburg	52	(7)
2015–2018	Hannover 96	76	(11)
2018–2021	VfL Wolfsburg	44	(1)
2021	→ Fortuna Düsseldorf (loan)	16	(2)
2021–2025	Fortuna Düsseldorf	99	(14)
2025–	Greuther Fürth	42	(11)

International career
2008–2009	Germany U17	6	(2)
2009–2010	Germany U18	6	(0)
2010–2011	Germany U19	3	(0)
2012	Germany U20	3	(1)
2014–2015	Germany U21	4	(0)
- * Club domestic league appearances and goals as of 18 May 2026

Felix Klaus (born 13 September 1992) is a German professional footballer who plays as a winger for 2. Bundesliga club Greuther Fürth.

== Club career ==
=== Greuther Fürth ===
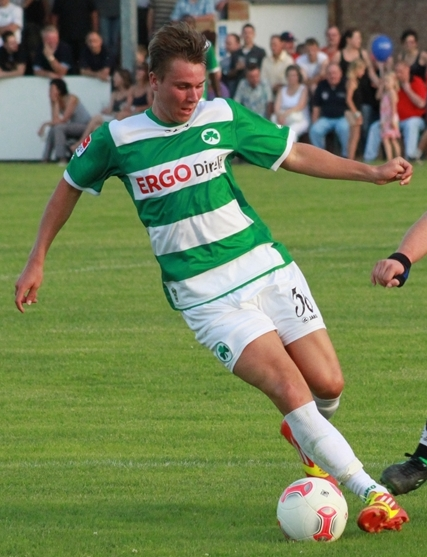
Klaus playing for Greuther Fürth, 2012

Klaus started his professional career with SpVgg Greuther Fürth, making his debut in the 2010–11 2. Bundesliga season. At the end of the season, he was voted by the fans as "Player of the Season", with his side being promoted to Bundesliga. On 31 August 2012, he scored the first ever Bundesliga goal of Greuther Fürth in a victory against 1. FSV Mainz 05.

=== SC Freiburg ===
On 20 May 2013, Klaus switched to SC Freiburg. Upon his arrival at the club, the club's sports director commented "With Felix Klaus we win a variably deployable offensive player who has already proven his talent in the Bundesliga". On 3 October, he made his debut for the club in a 2–0 defeat against Sevilla FC in the UEFA Europa League. On 25 January 2014, he scored a goal in the dying minutes of a 3–2 league victory against Bayer Leverkusen; as a result of which the club came out of the relegation zone. He went on to collect more than 50 caps during his stay at the club.

=== Hannover 96 ===
On 30 June 2015, Klaus joined Hannover 96 from freshly relegated SC Freiburg and signed a four-year contract. On 9 August, he made his debut for the club in a 2–0 victory against KSV Hessen Kassel in the DFB Pokal; and provided an assist to Salif Sané. On 24 October, he scored his first goal for the club in a 2–1 defeat against Eintracht Frankfurt.

=== VfL Wolfsburg ===
On 31 January 2018, it was announced that Klaus would join VfL Wolfsburg in the summer transfer window. However, at the pre-season, he suffered a stomach muscle injury, and in August it was announced that he would undergo an operation. On 12 August, he underwent an operation in Berlin and later wrote on Instagram that everything was fine with him.

==== Loan to Fortuna Düsseldorf ====
On 14 January 2021, Klaus joined Fortuna Düsseldorf on a loan deal until the end of the season.

=== Return to Greuther Fürth ===
On 13 January 2025, Klaus returned to Greuther Fürth on a two-and-a-half-year contract.

== International career ==
Klaus has been capped at the youth international level. He went on to represent the Germany under-21 team at the 2015 UEFA European Under-21 Championship.

== Personal life ==
Although Klaus was born in Osnabrück, he moved to Franconia at the age of 5. His father Fred Klaus is a retired footballer and a current coach.

== Career statistics ==
=== Club ===
As of match played on 30 May 2023

Appearances and goals by club, season and competition
Club	Season	League			Cup		International		Total	
Club	Season	Division	Apps	Goals	Apps	Goals	Apps	Goals	Apps	Goals
Greuther Fürth II	2009–10	Regionalliga	4	1	—		—		4	1
Greuther Fürth II	2010–11	Regionalliga	14	3	—		—		14	3
Greuther Fürth II	2011–12	Regionalliga	5	1	—		—		5	1
Greuther Fürth II	2012–13	Regionalliga	5	4	—		—		5	4
Greuther Fürth II	Total		28	9	—		—		28	9
Greuther Fürth	2010–11	2. Bundesliga	18	2	0	0	—		18	2
Greuther Fürth	2011–12	2. Bundesliga	20	2	2	0	—		22	2
Greuther Fürth	2012–13	Bundesliga	24	2	0	0	—		24	2
Greuther Fürth	Total		62	6	2	0	—		64	6
SC Freiburg	2013–14	Bundesliga	21	5	0	0	1 (Note: Appearance in UEFA Europa League)	0	22	5
SC Freiburg	2014–15	Bundesliga	31	2	3	0	—		34	2
SC Freiburg	Total		52	7	3	0	1	0	56	7
Hannover 96	2015–16	Bundesliga	18	1	2	0	—		20	1
Hannover 96	2016–17	2. Bundesliga	30	6	3	3	—		33	9
Hannover 96	2017–18	Bundesliga	28	4	1	0	—		29	4
Hannover 96	Total		76	11	6	3	—		82	14
VfL Wolfsburg	2018–19	Bundesliga	15	1	1	0	—		16	1
VfL Wolfsburg	2019–20	Bundesliga	23	0	1	0	5	0	29	0
VfL Wolfsburg	2020-21	Bundesliga	6	0	1	0	1	0	8	0
VfL Wolfsburg	Total		44	1	3	0	6	0	53	1
Fortuna Düsseldorf (loan)	2020-21	2. Bundesliga	16	2	—		—		16	2
Fortuna Düsseldorf	2021-22	2. Bundesliga	23	1	2	0	—		25	1
Fortuna Düsseldorf	2022-23	2. Bundesliga	32	6	3	0	—		35	6
Fortuna Düsseldorf	Total		71	9	5	0	—		76	9
Career total			333	43	19	3	7	0	359	46
