= Fred Klaus =

German footballer

Personal information
- Date of birth: 27 February 1967 (age 59)
- Place of birth: Eckental, Germany
- Position: Forward

Senior career*
Years	Team	Apps	(Gls)
1984–1987	1. FC Nürnberg	26	(2)
1986–1988	FC St. Pauli	55	(12)
1988–1989	Hamburger SV	15	(2)
1989–1990	Hertha BSC	31	(7)
1991–1995	VfL Osnabrück	78	(24)
1995–1997	Preußen Münster		
1997–1999	SC Weismain		
1999–2002	Quelle Fürth		

Managerial career
- 2002–2003: FC Bayern Hof
- * Club domestic league appearances and goals

Fred Klaus (born 27 February 1967) is a German former professional footballer who played as a forward. His son Felix Klaus is also a footballer.
