= Christopher Hübner =

German footballer

Personal information
- Date of birth: 15 November 1986 (age 39)
- Place of birth: Wiesbaden, West Germany
- Height: 1.89 m (6 ft 2 in)
- Position: Midfielder

Youth career
- –2005: SV Wehen Wiesbaden

Senior career*
| Years | Team | Apps | (Gls) |
| 2005–2011 | SV Wehen Wiesbaden II | 63 | (8) |
| 2008–2009 | SV Wehen Wiesbaden | 0 | (0) |
| 2011–2012 | Darmstadt 98 | 8 | (0) |
| 2012–2016 | SV Wiesbaden | 109 | (24) |
| Total | | 180 | (32) |
- * Club domestic league appearances and goals

Christopher Hübner (born 15 November 1986) is a German former professional footballer who played as a midfielder.

== Personal life ==
His brothers Benjamin and Florian are professional footballers and his father Bruno Hübner is director of sports at Eintracht Frankfurt.
