= Timo Königsmann =

German footballer

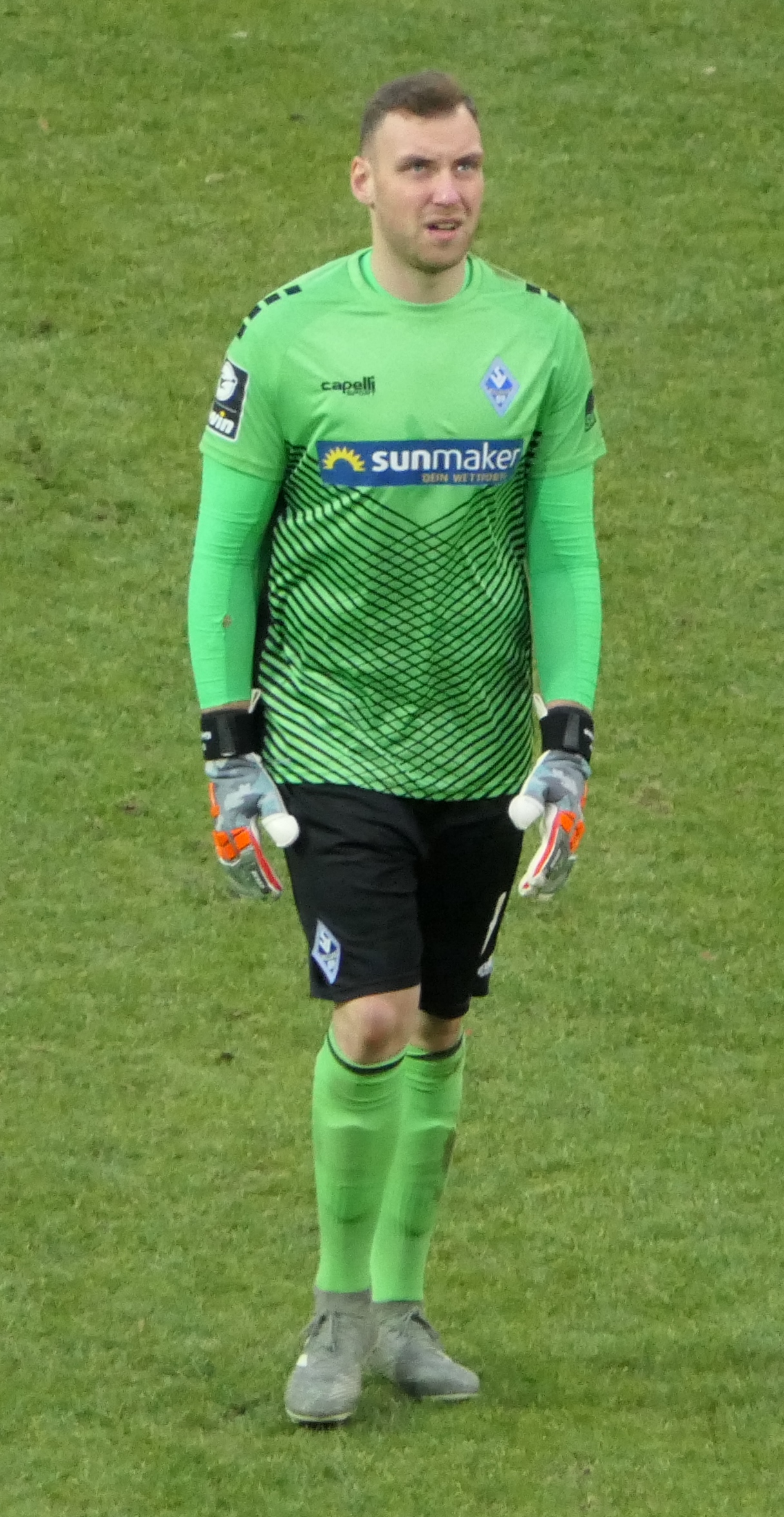
- Königsmann with Waldhof Mannheim in 2019

Personal information
- Date of birth: 5 April 1997 (age 29)
- Place of birth: Hanover, Germany
- Height: 1.86 m (6 ft 1 in)
- Position: Goalkeeper

Team information
- Current team: SV Sandhausen
- Number: 21

Youth career
- 2007–2016: Hannover 96

Senior career*
Years	Team	Apps	(Gls)
2014–2017	Hannover 96 II	39	(0)
2015–2016	Hannover 96	0	(0)
2017–2019	Greuther Fürth II	9	(0)
2017–2019	Greuther Fürth	0	(0)
2019	VfR Aalen	0	(0)
2019–2022	Waldhof Mannheim	83	(0)
2022–	SV Sandhausen	15	(0)

International career
2013–2014	Germany U17	11	(0)
2015	Germany U18	3	(0)
2015–2016	Germany U19	4	(0)
2016	Germany U20	1	(0)
- * Club domestic league appearances and goals as of 24 May 2025

Timo Königsmann (born 5 April 1997) is a German professional footballer who plays as a goalkeeper for club SV Sandhausen.

Königsmann joined 2. Bundesliga club SV Sandhausen on 21 October 2022, after regular goalkeepers Patrick Drewes and Benedikt Grawe were sidelined with injury. He had previously trialled with the club, and according to goalkeepers coach Daniel Ischdonat, Königsmann had "impressed" during training sessions and fit in well with the team.

== Honours ==
Individual

- Fritz Walter Medal U17 Bronze: 2014
