= Salif Sané =

Senegalese footballer (born 1990)

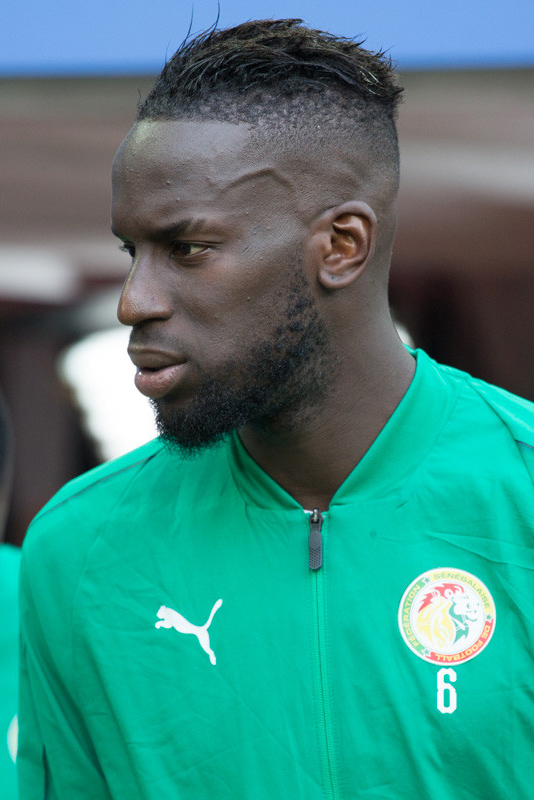
- Sané with Senegal at the 2018 FIFA World Cup

Personal information
- Full name: Salif Sané
- Date of birth: 25 August 1990 (age 36)
- Place of birth: Lormont, France
- Height: 1.96 m (6 ft 5 in)
- Position: Defender

Team information
- Current team: Mérignac

Senior career*
Years	Team	Apps	(Gls)
2010–2012	Bordeaux	4	(0)
2011–2012	→ Nancy (loan)	32	(2)
2011–2012	→ Nancy B (loan)	3	(0)
2012–2013	Nancy	34	(3)
2012–2013	Nancy B	1	(0)
2013–2018	Hannover 96	128	(12)
2013–2014	→ Hannover 96 II	13	(2)
2018–2022	Schalke 04	70	(4)
2024–2025	Libourne	7	(0)
2025–	Mérignac		

International career
2013–2020	Senegal	33	(0)
Medal record
Representing Senegal
Men's football
Africa Cup of Nations
Runner-up	2019
- * Club domestic league appearances and goals

Salif Sané (born 25 August 1990) is a professional footballer who plays as a defender for Mérignac.

Born in France, he represents Senegal at international level.

== Early and personal life ==
Sané was born in Lormont, France to Senegalese parents. His older half brother is fellow footballer Lamine Sané.

== Club career ==
Born in Lormont, Sané spent his early career playing club football in France for Bordeaux, Nancy and Nancy II. In June 2012 Sané rejected an offer from Belgian club Anderlecht. In May 2013 it was announced that he would transfer to German club Hannover 96 on 1 July 2013, signing a four-year contract with the club.

On 11 April 2018, Sané announced that he would be leaving Hannover 96 at the end of the season. It was announced that he would sign for Schalke 04 for the 2018–19 season. Whilst playing in defence for Schalke, he contested and won more aerial duels than any other player in the Bundesliga.

After leaving Schalke, he returned to France, playing for Libourne, and Mérignac.

== International career ==
In September 2012, Sané announced his intention to play international football for Senegal. He received his first international call up from Senegal in May 2013. He made his international debut later that year, and he has played in FIFA World Cup qualifying matches. In December 2014 he was named as part of Senegal's preliminary squad for the 2015 Africa Cup of Nations.

In May 2018 he was named in Senegal's 23 man squad for the 2018 World Cup in Russia.

== Career statistics ==
=== Club ===
As of 17 May 2022

Club	Season	League			National Cup		League Cup		Europe		Total	
Club	Season	Division	Apps	Goals	Apps	Goals	Apps	Goals	Apps	Goals	Apps	Goals
Bordeaux	2010–11	Ligue 1	4	0	1	0	0	0	—		5	0
Nancy	2011–12 (loan)	Ligue 1	32	2	1	0	0	0	—		33	2
Nancy	2012–13	Ligue 1	34	3	2	0	1	0	—		37	3
Nancy	Total		66	5	3	0	1	0	—		70	5
Hannover 96	2013–14	Bundesliga	19	2	1	0	—		—		20	2
Hannover 96	2014–15	Bundesliga	18	2	0	0	—		—		18	2
Hannover 96	2015–16	Bundesliga	31	2	2	1	—		—		33	3
Hannover 96	2016–17	2. Bundesliga	28	2	3	1	—		—		31	3
Hannover 96	2017–18	Bundesliga	32	4	2	0	—		—		34	4
Hannover 96	Total		128	12	8	2	—		—		136	14
Schalke 04	2018–19	Bundesliga	30	2	4	2	—		6 (Note: Appearances in UEFA Champions League)	0	40	4
Schalke 04	2019–20	Bundesliga	15	2	1	0	—		—		16	2
Schalke 04	2020–21	Bundesliga	14	0	1	0	—		—		15	0
Schalke 04	2021–22	2. Bundesliga	11	0	0	0	—		—		11	0
Schalke 04	Total		70	4	6	2	—		6	0	82	6
Career total			268	21	18	4	1	0	6	0	293	25

=== International ===
As of match played 15 November 2020

National team	Year	Apps	Goals
Senegal	2013	4	0
Senegal	2014	3	0
Senegal	2015	0	0
Senegal	2016	0	0
Senegal	2017	6	0
Senegal	2018	9	0
Senegal	2019	8	0
Senegal	2020	3	0
Total		33	0

== Honours ==
Senegal

- Africa Cup of Nations runner-up: 2019

Schalke 04

- 2. Bundesliga: 2021–22
