= Adrian Nikçi =

Footballer (born 1989)

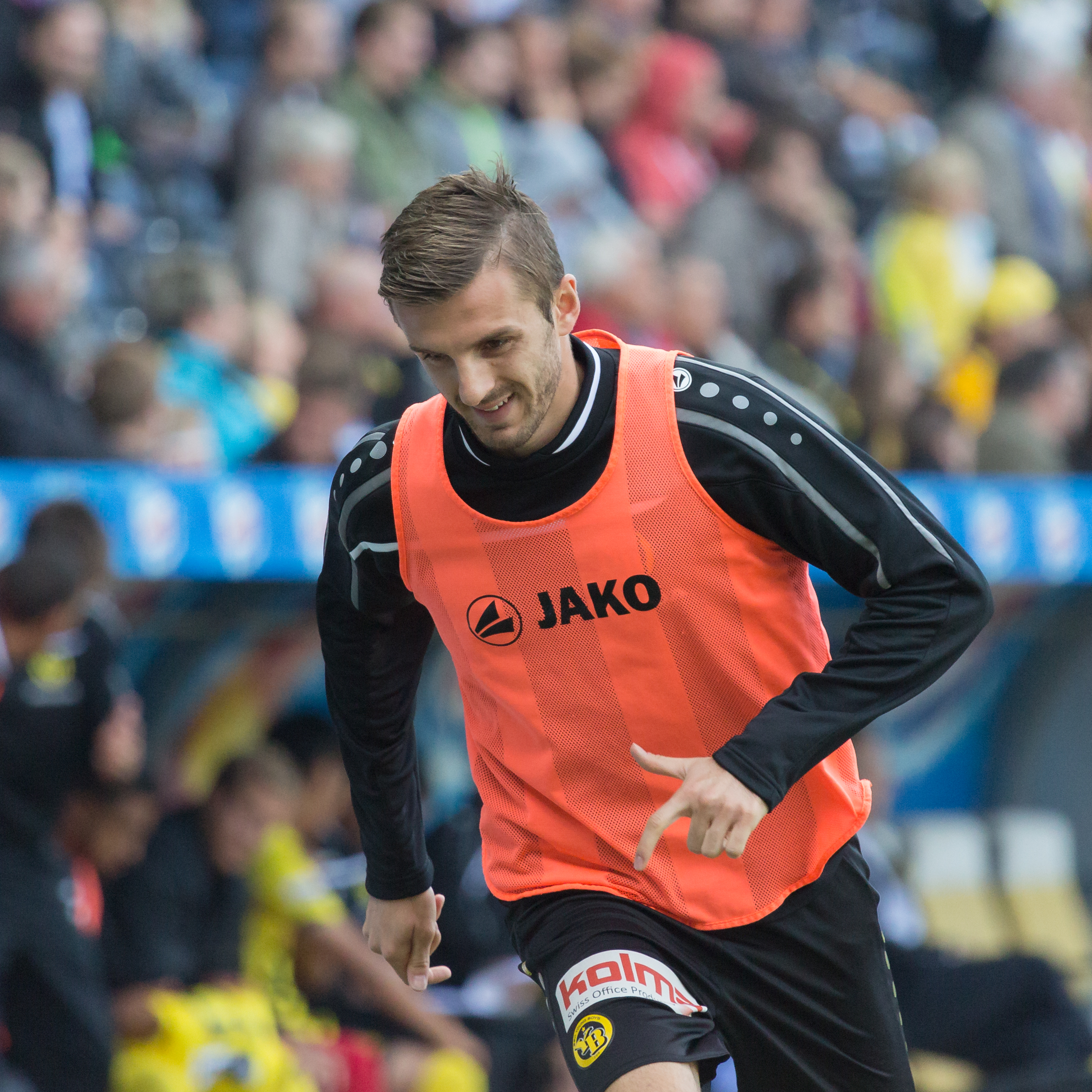
- Nikçi with Young Boys in 2014

Personal information
- Date of birth: 10 November 1989 (age 37)
- Place of birth: Sarajevo, SR Bosnia and Herzegovina, SFR Yugoslavia
- Height: 1.78 m (5 ft 10 in)
- Position: Midfielder

Youth career
- FC Uster
- 2002–2007: FC Zürich

Senior career*
Years	Team	Apps	(Gls)
2007–2012	FC Zürich	112	(17)
2012–2015	Hannover 96	4	(1)
2014	→ FC Thun (loan)	16	(3)
2014–2015	→ Young Boys (loan)	8	(0)
2015	1. FC Nürnberg	5	(0)
2015–2017	Union Berlin	12	(2)
2018–2020	Schaffhausen	9	(0)
2020–2021	FC Weesen	0	(0)
Total		166	(23)

International career
2008–2010	Switzerland U21	16	(3)
- * Club domestic league appearances and goals

Adrian Nikçi (born 10 November 1989) is a former professional footballer who played as a midfielder. Born in Bosnia and Herzegovina, Nikçi represented Switzerland internationally.

== Club career ==
Nikçi previously played with FC Zürich in the Swiss Super League.

At the end of the 2016–17 season, he was released by Union Berlin.

== International career ==
While Nikçi represented Switzerland at U19 and U21 levels, he expressed his interest in playing for Albania. He manifested this also in celebrating a goal by making the eagle sign with his two hands, the eagle being the symbol of the Albanian flag.
