= Bogna Sobiech =

Polish handball player (born 1990)

Personal information
- Nationality: Polish
- Born: 25 March 1990 (age 36) Chorzów, Poland
- Height: 1.68 m (5 ft 6 in)

Sport
- Sport: Handball
- Position: Left wing

Youth career
- Years: Team
- 2002–2007: Zryw Chorzów
- 2007–2008: Ruch Chorzów

Senior clubs
- Years: Team
- 2008–2011: Ruch Chorzów
- 2011: TSV Hannover-Burgdorf
- 2011–2012: VfL Wolfsburg
- 2012–2015: SVG Celle
- 2015–2017: HSG Hannover-Badenstedt
- 2017–2019: HSG Bensheim/Auerbach
- 2019–2020: Borussia Dortmund
- 2020–2021: Uskudar Istanbul
National team
- Years: Team
- 2009–2020: Poland

Bogna Sobiech (née Dybul; born 25 March 1990) is a Polish former female handball player for the Polish national team.

She participated at the 2018 European Women's Handball Championship.

== Personal life ==
She married Polish football player Artur Sobiech in 2017.
