= Edgar Prib =

Russian footballer (born 1989)

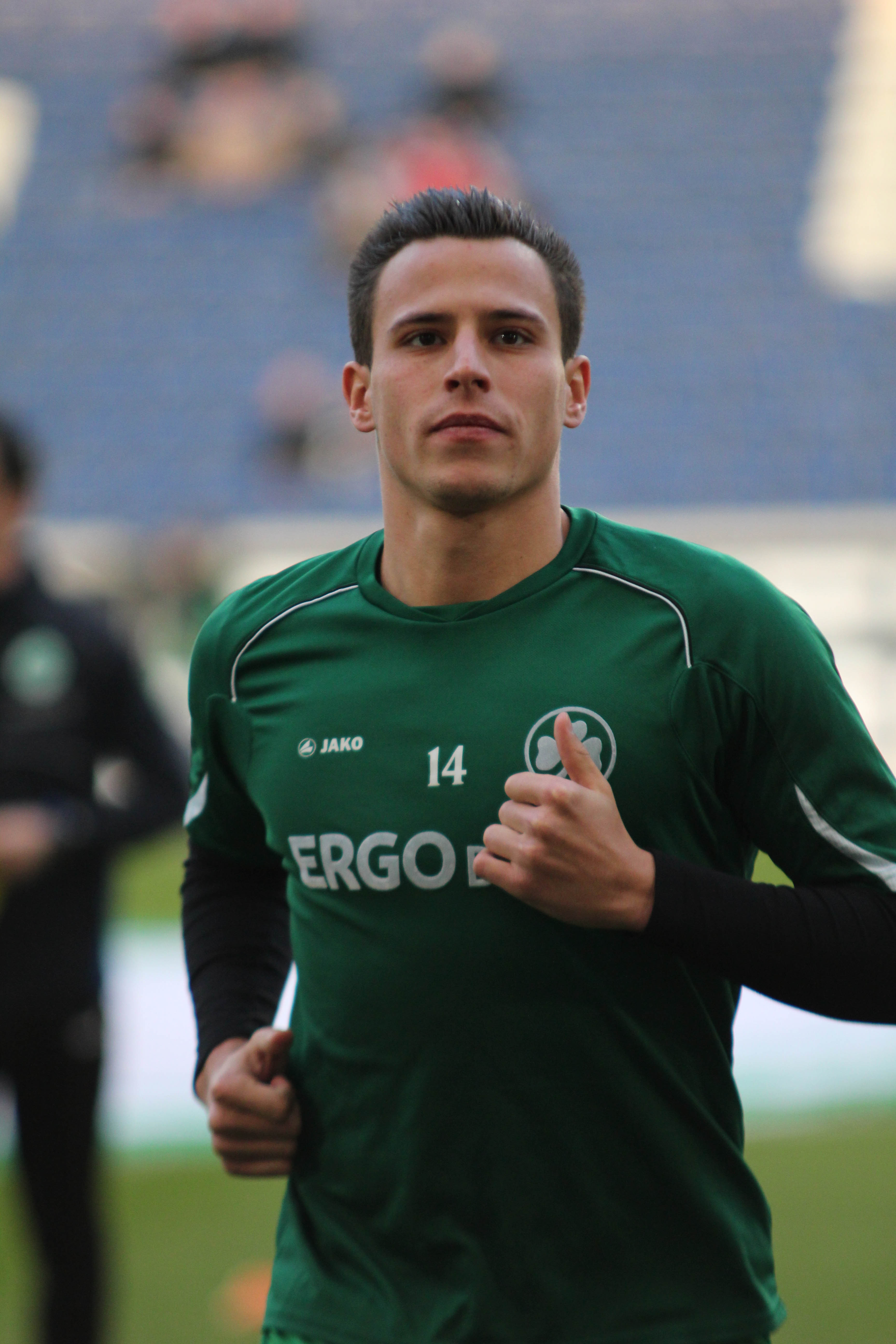
- Prib training with Greuther Fürth in 2012

Personal information
- Date of birth: 15 December 1989 (age 36)
- Place of birth: Neryungri, Sakha, Soviet Union
- Height: 1.81 m (5 ft 11 in)
- Position: Midfielder

Team information
- Current team: Greuther Fürth II
- Number: 14

Youth career
- 1996–2008: Greuther Fürth

Senior career*
Years	Team	Apps	(Gls)
2008–2009	Greuther Fürth II	35	(5)
2009–2013	Greuther Fürth	101	(9)
2013–2020	Hannover 96	128	(9)
2015–2019	→ Hannover 96 II	3	(3)
2020–2022	Fortuna Düsseldorf	43	(1)
2022–2023	Manisa	24	(3)
2023–	Greuther Fürth II	35	(1)
- * Club domestic league appearances and goals as of 1 January 2025

Edgar Prib (Russian: Эдгар Приб; born 15 December 1989) is a Russian professional footballer who plays as a midfielder for Greuther Fürth II.

== Early life ==
Prib was born in Neryungri, now Russia, in 1989 into an ethnic German family. He emigrated to Germany with his family when he was two years old, settling in Fürth, where he enrolled the SpVgg Greuther Fürth academy.

== Club career ==
=== Greuther Fürth ===
Prib made it to the Shamrocks′ first team during the 2009–10 2. Bundesliga season. He missed a major part of the campaign due to torn ankle joint ligament, but he managed to play a total of 11 games anyway. Next season, this number increased to 13, and in the 2011–12 season he became a regular starter, gaining 27 league appearances and helping his team win the 2. Bundesliga and promote to the top division for the first time in their history. The first top-flight season was, however, unsuccessful as Greuther Fürth bottomed the 2012–13 Bundesliga table, resulting in relegation. In spite of that, Prib managed to stay in the Bundesliga: during the 2013 summer transfer window he signed with Hannover 96 for an estimated fee of €2.5 million.

=== Hannover 96 ===
Prib made his debut for the new club on 10 August 2013, starting the initial game of the season against VfL Wolfsburg at home, the fixture die Rote won 2–0. He scored twice in his 31 league games that season, also receiving 5 yellow cards. His club finished 10th in the Bundesliga. Next year, he scored against Schalke 04 helping his team win their very first match of the 2014–15 Bundesliga season, this was, however, his only goal in that competition as he injured his meniscus shortly after, reducing his number of league appearances to 20 but helping Hannover avoid relegation. A similar thing happened next season: Prib was ruled out with an injury early in September 2015, missing nine games in a row. The only difference was that the Reds finished last in the table, relegating to 2. Bundesliga gaining only 25 points.

Hannover successfully returned to the top flight at the first attempt, promoting directly after finishing second in the 2016–17 2. Bundesliga. Prib played most of his team's games scoring once against his former club, Greuther Fürth. He also received a total of 10 bookings in that campaign.

On 9 August 2017, Prib was appointed the club captain. He only played once in the 2017–18 season, spending 90 minutes in the German Cup 1st Round away fixture against Bonner SC, a game that Hannover won 6–2. Shortly after he was diagnosed with cruciate ligament rupture, an injury he picked up during the training. Prib was due to return in April, but was injured again and failed to make a single league appearance. On 3 May 2018, his contract was extended until May 2019. Prib made his comeback for Hannover on 27 April 2019, coming on as a half-time substitute in a 1–0 home win against Mainz 05 in the Bundesliga.

=== Fortuna Düsseldorf ===
On 1 September 2020, Prib agreed the termination of his contract with Hannover 96. One day later, he signed a two-year contract with Fortuna Düsseldorf.

=== Manisa ===
On 29 July 2022, Prib signed with Manisa in Turkey.

=== Return to Greuther Fürth ===
On 19 September 2023, Prib returned to Greuther Fürth, joining their reserves team in Regionalliga.

== International career ==
Since Prib was born in Russia, he is eligible for both Russian and German national teams, although in 2016 he said he ″dreams of representing Russia internationally″.
