= Tim Dierßen =

German footballer

Personal information
- Date of birth: 15 January 1996 (age 30)
- Place of birth: Stadthagen, Germany
- Height: 1.72 m (5 ft 8 in)
- Position: Attacking midfielder

Youth career
- Viktoria Lauenau
- DSG Feggendorf
- 2007–2013: Hannover 96

Senior career*
Years	Team	Apps	(Gls)
2013–2019	Hannover 96 II	128	(11)
2014–2019	Hannover 96	4	(0)
2020–2021	Kickers Offenbach	18	(0)
2022–2024	Hessen Kassel	30	(1)
2024–2026	TSV Havelse	7	(0)

International career
2010	Germany U15	1	(0)
2011–2012	Germany U16	4	(0)
2012–2013	Germany U17	7	(1)
- * Club domestic league appearances and goals as of 16 May 2026

Tim Dierßen (born 15 January 1996) is a German footballer who plays as an attacking midfielder.

== Club career ==
Dierßen is a youth exponent from Hannover 96. He made his Bundesliga debut at 25 April 2014 against VfB Stuttgart. He substituted Szabolcs Huszti in the extra time.

On 7 July 2020, Dierßen joined Kickers Offenbach on a deal until June 2021.

On 12 July 2024, Dierßen joined Regionalliga Nord club TSV Havelse.

== Career statistics ==
As of 14 May 2016

Appearances and goals by club, season and competition
Club	Season	League			Cup^{1}		Total		Ref.
Club	Season	League	Apps	Goals	Apps	Goals	Apps	Goals	Ref.
Hannover II	2013–14	Regionalliga Nord	10	2	—		10	2	
Hannover II	2014–15	Regionalliga Nord	21	1	—		21	1	
Hannover II	2015–16	Regionalliga Nord	29	2	—		29	2	
Hannover II	Total		60	5	0	0	60	5	—
Hannover	2014–15	Bundesliga	2	0	0	0	2	0	
Hannover	2015–16	Bundesliga	1	0	0	0	1	0	
Hannover	Total		3	0	0	0	3	0	—
Career total			63	5	0	0	63	5	—
