= Artur Sobiech =

Polish footballer (born 1990)

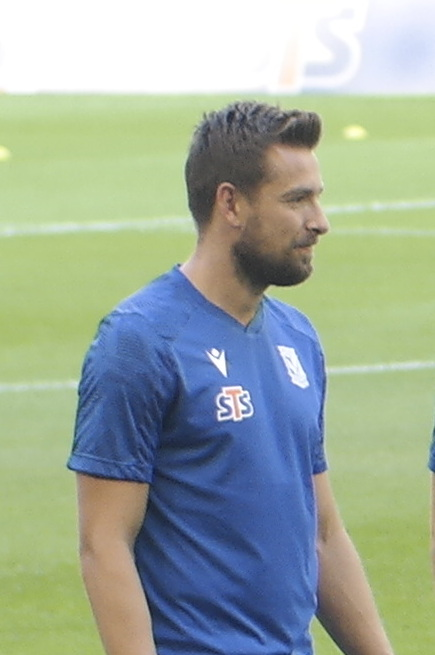
- Sobiech with Lech Poznań in 2022

Personal information
- Full name: Artur Adam Sobiech
- Date of birth: 12 June 1990 (age 36)
- Place of birth: Ruda Śląska, Poland
- Height: 1.85 m (6 ft 1 in)
- Position: Forward

Team information
- Current team: Cracovia (director of football)

Youth career
- 2005–2006: Grunwald Ruda Śląska
- 2006–2008: Ruch Chorzów

Senior career*
Years	Team	Apps	(Gls)
2008–2010	Ruch Chorzów	47	(12)
2010–2011	Polonia Warsaw	23	(9)
2011–2017	Hannover 96	121	(20)
2017–2018	Darmstadt 98	22	(2)
2018–2020	Lechia Gdańsk	44	(13)
2020–2021	Fatih Karagümrük	51	(16)
2021–2024	Lech Poznań	38	(3)
2022–2023	Lech Poznań II	5	(2)
2024–2025	Ethnikos Achna	18	(0)
Total		369	(77)

International career
2011	Poland U20	1	(0)
2009–2012	Poland U21	10	(3)
2010–2015	Poland	13	(2)
- * Club domestic league appearances and goals

Artur Adam Sobiech ([ˈartur ˈsɔbjɛx]; born 12 June 1990) is a Polish former professional footballer who played as a forward. He is currently the director of football of Ekstraklasa club Cracovia. From 2008 to 2025, he represented clubs such as Polonia Warsaw, Hannover 96, Lechia Gdańsk and Lech Poznań, among others.

== Club career ==
Sobiech was born in Ruda Śląska. After spending four years at Ruch Chorzów, where he started his professional career, Sobiech joined Polonia Warsaw in July 2010. Polonia paid €1 million for him. He was named Ekstraklasa discovery of the year.

On 30 June 2011, Sobiech transferred to Bundesliga side Hannover 96, signing a contract until June 2014. In May 2013, the club announced that he had extended his contract until 30 June 2017.

On 9 August 2018, Sobiech joined Lechia Gdańsk on a three-year contract. In his first season at Lechia Sobiech found himself to be the second choice forward behind Flávio Paixão. His season started well, scoring a hat-trick against Zagłębie Lubin, but then only managed to score another four league goals in his next 23 games. Sobiech fared better in the Polish Cup that season, scoring three goals in four games, including scoring the only goal in the 2019 Polish Cup final against Jagiellonia Białystok to secure the cup win for Lechia. Despite statistically not having the best season, Sobiech played an important role in Lechia securing their joint highest league finish in their history of third, and leading the club to cup success. The following season started well for both Sobiech and Lechia, with Sobiech coming on as a substitute as Lechia won the Polish Super Cup.

After a promising start for Lechia in the 2019–20 season, Sobiech left the club during the winter break for Fatih Karagümrük. In total Sobiech made 52 appearances and scored 16 goals in the club's most successful period in their modern history.

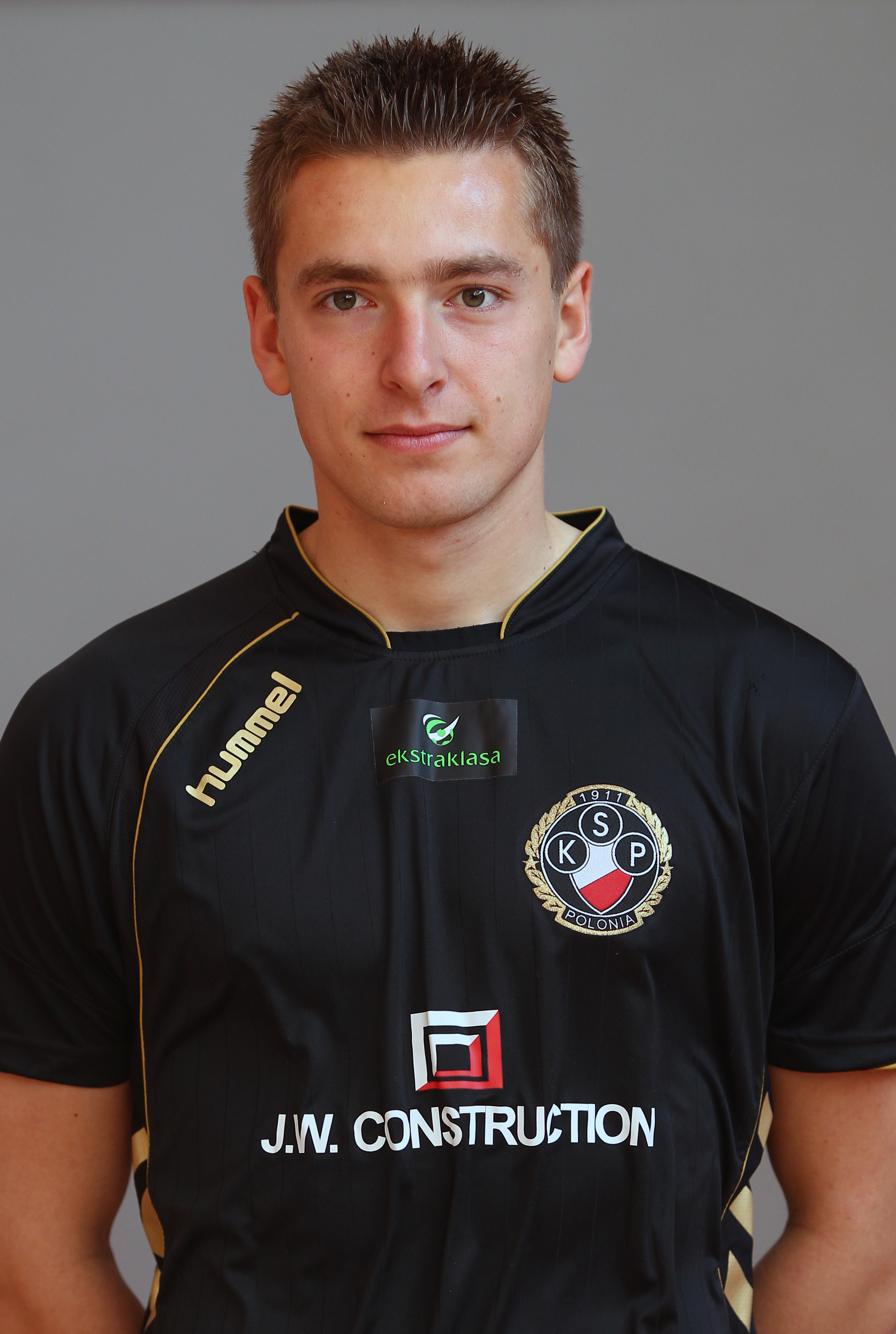
Sobiech as a Polonia Warsaw player in 2011

On 29 June 2021, Sobiech made his return to Polish football by signing a two-year contract with Lech Poznań. Brought in as a back-up for club's captain Mikael Ishak, Sobiech saw limited playing time due to health issues. He contributed to the club's Ekstraklasa championship in the 2021–22 campaign, and scored the third of Lech's goals in a 3–2 away win over Italian side Fiorentina in a UEFA Europa Conference League quarter-final match on 20 April 2023. On 23 May 2024, having not made a single appearance that year after suffering a knee injury during the winter break, Lech announced Sobiech would leave the club at the end of the season.

On 30 August 2024, Sobiech joined Cypriot First Division club Ethnikos Achna on a one-year deal, with an option for another year.

On 4 July 2025, Sobiech retired from professional football after enrolling in the UEFA Executive Master for International Players course.

== International career ==
After playing for the Poland U-21 team, Sobiech received his first call-up to the Poland national team in May 2010. He debuted on 29 May against Finland, replacing Ireneusz Jeleń in the 89th minute. The match ended in a goalless 0–0 result. He scored his first goal on 22 May 2012 in a 1–0 friendly win against Latvia. He represented the national team at the UEFA Euro 2012.

== Post-playing career ==
On 31 March 2026, Sobiech was appointed director of football of Ekstraklasa club Cracovia.

== Personal life ==
He married Polish handball player Bogna Sobiech in 2017.

== Career statistics ==
=== Club ===
Appearances and goals by club, season and competition
Club	Season	League			National cup (Note: Includes Polish Cup, DFB-Pokal, Turkish Cup, Cypriot Cup)		Continental		Other		Total	
Club	Season	Division	Apps	Goals	Apps	Goals	Apps	Goals	Apps	Goals	Apps	Goals
Ruch Chorzów	2008–09	Ekstraklasa	19	2	1	0	—		—		20	2
Ruch Chorzów	2009–10	Ekstraklasa	28	10	6	2	—		—		34	12
Ruch Chorzów	2010–11	Ekstraklasa	0	0	—		4 (Note: Appearances in UEFA Europa League)	1	—		4	1
Ruch Chorzów	Total		47	12	7	2	4	1	—		58	15
Polonia Warsaw	2010–11	Ekstraklasa	23	9	4	0	—		—		27	9
Hannover 96	2011–12	Bundesliga	12	1	0	0	6	2	—		18	3
Hannover 96	2012–13	Bundesliga	25	5	2	0	10	3	—		37	8
Hannover 96	2013–14	Bundesliga	17	3	1	1	—		—		18	4
Hannover 96	2014–15	Bundesliga	19	2	1	0	—		—		20	2
Hannover 96	2015–16	Bundesliga	25	7	2	1	—		—		27	8
Hannover 96	2016–17	2. Bundesliga	23	2	2	1	—		—		25	3
Hannover 96	Total		121	20	8	3	16	5	—		145	28
Darmstadt 98	2017–18	2. Bundesliga	22	2	1	1	—		—		23	3
Lechia Gdańsk	2018–19	Ekstraklasa	26	7	4	3	—		—		30	10
Lechia Gdańsk	2019–20	Ekstraklasa	18	6	2	0	2	0	1 (Note: Appearance in Polish Super Cup)	0	23	6
Lechia Gdańsk	Total		44	13	6	3	2	0	1	0	53	16
Fatih Karagümrük	2019–20	TFF First League	17	7	—		—		—		17	7
Fatih Karagümrük	2020–21	Süper Lig	34	9	1	0	—		—		35	9
Fatih Karagümrük	Total		51	16	1	0	—		—		52	16
Lech Poznań	2021–22	Ekstraklasa	12	0	3	1	—		—		15	1
Lech Poznań	2022–23	Ekstraklasa	15	3	1	0	7 (Note: Appearances in UEFA Europa Conference League)	1	1	0	24	4
Lech Poznań	2023–24	Ekstraklasa	11	0	1	0	3	0	—		15	0
Lech Poznań	Total		38	3	5	1	10	1	1	0	54	5
Lech Poznań II	2022–23	II liga	3	1	0	0	—		—		3	1
Lech Poznań II	2023–24	II liga	2	1	0	0	—		—		2	1
Lech Poznań II	Total		5	2	0	0	—		—		5	2
Ethnikos Achna	2024–25	Cypriot First Division	18	0	1	1	—		—		19	1
Career total			369	77	33	11	32	7	2	0	436	95

=== International ===
Appearances and goals by national team and year
National team	Year	Apps	Goals
Poland	2010	3	0
Poland	2012	5	1
Poland	2013	3	1
Poland	2015	2	0
Total		13	2

Scores and results list Poland's goal tally first, score column indicates score after each Sobiech goal.

List of international goals scored by Artur Sobiech
No.	Date	Venue	Opponent	Score	Result	Competition
1	22 May 2012	Hypo-Arena, Klagenfurt, Austria	Latvia	1–0	1–0	Friendly
2	4 June 2013	Marshal Józef Piłsudski Stadium, Kraków, Poland	Liechtenstein	1–0	2–0	Friendly

== Honours ==
Lechia Gdańsk

- Polish Cup: 2018–19
- Polish Super Cup: 2019

Lech Poznań

- Ekstraklasa: 2021–22

Individual

- Ekstraklasa Discovery of the Season: 2009–10
