= 2024–25 Al Sadd SC season =

Al Sadd SC
2024–25 season
- Chairman: Muhammed bin Khalifa Al Thani
- Head coach: Félix Sánchez (from 23 July 2024)
- Stadium: Jassim Bin Hamad Stadium
- Qatar Stars League: 1st
- Emir of Qatar Cup: Quarter-finals
- Qatar Cup: Winners
- Champions League: Quarter-finals
- Top goalscorer: League: Rafa Mújica, Akram Afif (18); All: Akram Afif (23)
Home colours	Away colours	Third colours

In the 2024–25 season, Al Sadd SC is competing in the Qatar Stars League for the 52nd season, as well as the Emir of Qatar Cup, and the AFC Champions League Elite.

== Review ==
=== Background ===
On May 16, 2024, Al Sadd announced the departure of Baghdad Bounedjah, after nine years with the team, during which Bounedjah became the club's all-time top scorer, according to what the team announced in an official press release. The club wrote in its message: “In your career with Al-Zaeem, you created a feat and sometimes a miracle. You were the best representative of the Arab player and the best ambassador of beloved Algeria. Everyone who was in the locker room loved you. Thank you for every moment of joy you gave us, for every smile. You will remain an important part of the club’s history for everyone.” On May 30, Al Sadd concluded its first deal by signing the Spanish striker Rafa Mújica from Arouca in a four-year deal. On July 23, Al Sadd Club announced the appointment of Spanish coach Félix Sánchez to lead the first team. The club explained in a statement that Sanchez signed a two-year contract, which will continue until the summer of 2026. Sánchez is scheduled to begin his duties with the team during its preparatory camp in Malaga, Spain.

On July 18, rumors of Abdessamed Bounacer's departure have increased since the beginning of the transfer market, and according to some journalists, the 19-year-old young defender is in Qatar with his agent to negotiate his transfer to Al Sadd. The club would be ready to pay the player's release clause which would amount to 500,000 euros. On July 24, Al Sadd announced its official contract with Bounacer for a period of five years. Bounacer suffered a very serious injury during training. The club announced on August 21, that he will undergo ankle surgery at Aspetar and that he will be out for three months, with a return in November or December. During the international break in September, Al Sadd signed right-back Youcef Atal and Cristo González from Arouca in a deal worth 6 million euros. Atal will not be able to participate in Qatari league matches until next January. This situation follows the rules imposed by the Qatari Football Association, which limits the number of foreign players to seven per team. However, Al Sadd SC has already reached this limit.

== Squad list ==
Players and squad numbers last updated on 4 May 2023.
Note: Flags indicate national team as has been defined under FIFA eligibility rules. Players may hold more than one non-FIFA nationality.

No.	Nat.	Name	Position	Date of birth (age)	Signed from
Goalkeepers
1	(Qatar)	Saad Al Sheeb	GK	19 February 1990 (aged 34)	(Qatar) Youth system
22	(Qatar)	Meshaal Barsham	GK	14 February 1998 (aged 26)	(Qatar) Youth system
31	(Qatar)	Youssef Abdullah	GK	30 October 2002 (aged 21)	(Qatar) Al-Shamal
Defenders
2	(Qatar)	Pedro Miguel	CB	6 August 1990 (aged 34)	(Qatar) Al Ahli
5	(Qatar)	Tarek Salman	CB	5 December 1997 (aged 26)	(Spain) Júpiter Leonés
6	(Brazil)	Paulo Otávio	LB	23 November 1994 (aged 29)	(Germany) VfL Wolfsburg
13	(Qatar)	Abdullah Al-Yazidi	RB	28 March 2002 (aged 22)	(Qatar) Youth system
16	(Qatar)	Boualem Khoukhi	LB / CB	7 September 1990 (aged 33)	(Qatar) Al Arabi
37	(Qatar)	Ahmed Suhail	CB	8 February 1999 (aged 25)	(Qatar) Youth system
66	(Qatar)	Abdulrahman Al-Ameen	CB	9 March 2004 (aged 20)	(Qatar) Youth system
70	(Qatar)	Musab Kheder	RB	1 January 1993 (aged 31)	(Qatar) Youth system
81	(Algeria)	Abdessamed Bounacer	CB	11 December 2004 (aged 19)	(Algeria) USM Alger
29	(Morocco)	Romain Saïss	CB	26 March 1990 (aged 34)	(Saudi Arabia) Al Shabab (loan Return)
77	(Algeria)	Youcef Atal	RB	17 May 1996 (aged 28)	(Turkey) Adana Demirspor
Midfielders
3	(Qatar)	Ahmed Sayyar	DM	6 October 1993 (aged 30)	(Qatar) Al-Gharafa
4	(Mali)	Mohamed Camara	DM	6 January 2000 (aged 24)	(France) AS Monaco
7	(Qatar)	Mohammed Waad	CM / DM / AM	18 September 1999 (aged 24)	(Qatar) Youth system
8	(Qatar)	Ali Assadalla	CM	19 January 1993 (aged 31)	(Bahrain) Al Muharraq
10	(Qatar)	Hassan Al-Haidos (C.)	RW / LW / AM	11 December 1990 (aged 33)	(Qatar) Youth system
18	(Brazil)	Guilherme Torres	DM	5 April 1991 (aged 33)	(Greece) Olympiacos
88	(Colombia)	Mateus Uribe	CM / DM	21 March 1991 (aged 33)	(Portugal) Porto
96	(Algeria)	Adam Ounas	RW / AM	11 November 1996 (aged 27)	Unattached
11	(Brazil)	Claudinho	AM	28 January 1997 (aged 27)	(Russia) Zenit Saint Petersburg
Forwards
9	(Qatar)	Yusuf Abdurisag	CF	6 August 1999 (aged 25)	(Qatar) Youth system
19	(Spain)	Rafa Mújica	CF	29 October 1998 (aged 25)	(Portugal) Arouca
21	(Brazil)	Giovanni Henrique	RW	1 January 2004 (aged 20)	(Brazil) Palmeiras
23	(Qatar)	Hashim Ali	RW	17 August 2000 (aged 23)	(Qatar) Al-Rayyan (Loan return)
84	(Qatar)	Akram Afif	LW / RW	18 November 1996 (aged 27)	(Spain) Villarreal
17	(Spain)	Cristo González	SS	24 October 1997 (aged 26)	(Portugal) Arouca

== Pre-season and friendlies ==
15 July 2024 Friendly	Al Sadd SC (Qatar)	8–0	(Gibraltar) Manchester 62	Málaga, Spain
19:00 UTC+2		Report		Stadium: Banus football center

19 July 2024 Friendly	Al Sadd SC (Qatar)	3–2	(South Africa) Orlando Pirates	Málaga, Spain
19:30 UTC+2	Hashim Ali 3'; Sesane 40' (o.g.); Plata 54'	Report	Mabaso 9', 10'	Stadium: Marbella football center

23 July 2024 Friendly	UD Las Palmas (Spain)	0–0	(Qatar) Al Sadd SC	Málaga, Spain
19:30 UTC+2		Report		Stadium: Marbella football center Referee: Manuel Jesús Orellana Cid

28 July 2024 Friendly	UD Almería (Spain)	1–1	(Qatar) Al Sadd SC	Málaga, Spain
19:00 UTC+2	Baptistão 42'	Report	Otávio 65'	Stadium: La Quinta Football Center; Referee: Ignacio De Santisteban Adame

5 August 2024 Friendly	Al Sadd SC (Qatar)	1–0	(Egypt) Ismaily SC	Doha
19:30 UTC+3	Giovanni 90'	Report		Stadium: Jassim bin Hamad Stadium

== Transfers ==
=== In ===
Date	Pos	Player	From club	Transfer fee	Source
30 May 2024	FW	(Spain) Rafa Mújica	(Portugal) Arouca	10,000,000 €	
30 June 2024	CB	(Morocco) Romain Saïss	(Saudi Arabia) Al Shabab	Loan Return	
24 July 2024	CB	(Algeria) Abdessamed Bounacer	(Algeria) USM Alger	500,000 €	
30 July 2024	DM	(Mali) Mohamed Camara	(France) AS Monaco	16,500,000 €	
9 September 2024	RB	(Algeria) Youcef Atal	(Turkey) Adana Demirspor	Free transfer	
9 September 2024	SS	(Spain) Cristo González	(Portugal) Arouca	6,000,000 €	
2 November 2024	RW / AM	(Algeria) Adam Ounas	Unattached	Free transfer	
22 January 2025	AM	(Brazil) Claudinho	(Russia) Zenit Saint Petersburg	Undisclosed	

=== Out ===
Date	Pos	Player	To club	Transfer fee	Source
23 June 2024	ST	(Algeria) Baghdad Bounedjah	Al-Shamal SC	Free transfer	
11 July 2024	DF	(Iran) Amin Hazbavi	(Iran) Sepahan	Free transfer	
30 August 2024	RW	(Ecuador) Gonzalo Plata	(Brazil) Flamengo	Free transfer	
17 January 2025	CM / DM	(Colombia) Mateus Uribe	(Colombia) Atlético Nacional	Free transfer (Released)	

== Competitions ==
=== Overview ===
Competition	Record								Started round	Final position / round	First match	Last match
Competition	G	W	D	L	GF	GA	GD	Win %	Started round	Final position / round	First match	Last match
Qatar Stars League	22	17	1	4	62	23	+39	77.27	Matchday 1	Winner	10 August 2024	18 April 2025
Emir of Qatar Cup	2	1	1	0	5	3	+2	50.00	Round of 16	Quarter-finals	6 May 2025	14 May 2025
Qatar Cup	2	1	1	0	5	2	+3	50.00	Semi-finals	Winner	22 April 2025	10 May 2025
Champions League	11	4	4	3	16	14	+2	36.36	Group stage	Quarter-finals	16 September 2024	27 April 2025
Total	37	23	7	7	88	42	+46	62.16				

Updated to match played 14 May 2025
Source: Competitions

=== Qatar Stars League ===
==== League table ====
Pos	Team	Pld	W	D	L	GF	GA	GD	Pts	Qualification or relegation
1	Al Sadd (C)	22	17	1	4	62	23	+39	52	Qualification for the AFC Champions League Elite League stage (Note: Al-Gharafa qualified for the AFC Champions League Elite as the 2025 Emir of Qatar Cup winners. As a result, the second AFC Champions League Two berth was passed to the team in 4th place.)
2	Al-Duhail	22	16	2	4	51	20	+31	50	Qualification for the AFC Champions League Elite play-off round
3	Al-Gharafa	22	12	5	5	41	30	+11	41	Qualification for the AFC Champions League Elite League stage
4	Al Ahli	22	10	5	7	38	39	−1	35	Qualification for the AFC Champions League Two group stage
5	Al-Rayyan	22	10	3	9	45	35	+10	33	Qualification for the AGCFF Gulf Club Champions League group stage

Source: QSL, Soccerway
Rules for classification: 1) Points; 2) Goal difference; 3) Number of goals scored;
(C) Champions

==== Results summary ====
Overall								Home						Away					
Pld	W	D	L	GF	GA	GD	Pts	W	D	L	GF	GA	GD	W	D	L	GF	GA	GD
22	17	1	4	62	23	+39	52	9	0	2	30	9	+21	8	1	2	32	14	+18

Last updated: 18 April 2025.
Source: Competitive matches

==== Results by round ====
Round	1	2	3	4	5	6	7	8	9	10	11	12	13	14	15	16	17	18	19	20	21	22
Ground	A	A	H	H	A	H	H	A	H	A	A	H	H	A	A	H	A	A	H	A	H	H
Result	L	W	W	L	L	W	W	W	W	W	D	W	L	W	W	W	W	W	W	W	W	W
Position	10	3	3	3	7	5	3	2	2	2	2	2	3	2	2	2	2	2	2	1	1	1

Updated to match(es) played on 18 April 2025. Source: Competitive matches
A = Away; H = Home; W = Win; D = Draw; L = Loss

==== Matches ====
Win Draw Loss

10 August 2024 Round 1	Al-Shamal SC	2–1	Al Sadd	Al Rayyan
20:30	Bounedjah 31', 74'	Report	Murillo 89' (o.g.)	Stadium: Ahmad bin Ali Stadium; Referee: Nayef Mohamed El-Kadiri

17 August 2024 Round 2	Qatar SC	1–5	Al Sadd	Al Rayyan
18:30	Martínez 14'	Report	Mújica 2', 88'; Waad 48'; Khoukhi 55'; Bostami 90+5' (o.g.)	Stadium: Khalifa International Stadium; Referee: Abdulrahman Al-Jassim

22 August 2024 Round 3	Al Sadd	5–0	Al-Arabi SC	Doha
20:30	Mújica 8' (pen.), 26', 89'; Akram Afif 19'; Giovanni 60'	Report		Stadium: Jassim bin Hamad Stadium; Referee: Salman Ahmad Falahi

13 September 2024 Round 4	Al Sadd	1–3	Umm Salal SC	Doha
20:00	Al-Haidos 70' (pen.)	Report	Gorré 2'; Mance 22'; Essien 90+3'	Stadium: Jassim bin Hamad Stadium; Referee: Moatasem Al Mazyed

21 September 2024 Round 5	Al-Duhail SC	5–1	Al Sadd	Al Rayyan
18:00	Olunga 13'; Edmilson 28', 40'; Ahmed 33'; Almoez Ali 56'	Report	Al-Haidos 45+2'	Stadium: Khalifa International Stadium; Referee: Khamis Al Marri

26 September 2024 Round 6	Al Sadd	4–2	Al-Gharafa SC	Doha
20:00	Miguel 4'; González 7'; Akram Afif 27'; Al-Haidos 90+9'	Report	Joselu 42'; Brahimi 59'	Stadium: Jassim bin Hamad Stadium; Referee: Mohammed Al-Sherif

18 October 2024 Round 7	Al Sadd	4–2	Al Shahaniya SC	Doha
19:30	Meshaal 2'; Mújica 19'; González 23'; Amersfoort 78' (o.g.)	Report	Koroma 54', 89'	Stadium: Jassim bin Hamad Stadium; Referee: Nayef Mohamed El-Kadiri

27 October 2024 Round 8	Al-Wakrah	0–3	Al Sadd	Al Wakrah
17:30		Report	Mújica 24', 86'; Akram Afif 59'	Stadium: Al Janoub Stadium; Referee: Mohamed Al-Shammari

31 October 2024 Round 9	Al Sadd	2–1	Al-Rayyan	Doha
19:30	Waad 69'; Akram Afif 89'	Report	Trézéguet 67'	Stadium: Jassim bin Hamad Stadium; Referee: Salman Ahmad Falahi

22 November 2024 Round 10	Al-Khor	2–5	Al Sadd	Al Khor
16:00	Semedo 3'; Hanni 8'	Report	Suhail 10'; Saïss 27'; Akram Afif 48', 54'; González 68'	Stadium: Al-Khor SC Stadium; Referee: Moatasem Al Mazyed

7 December 2024 Round 11	Al-Ahli	2–2	Al Sadd	Doha
15:00	Draxler 45+3', 52'	Report	Akram Afif 13', 59'	Stadium: Al Thumama Stadium; Referee: Abdulrahman Al-Jassim

12 January 2025 Round 12	Al Sadd	1–0	Al-Shamal SC	Doha
18:30	Abdurisag 74'	Report		Stadium: Jassim bin Hamad Stadium; Referee: Abdulhadi Al Ruaile

23 January 2025 Round 13	Al Sadd	0–1	Qatar SC	Doha
16:30		Report	Abdel Kader 83'	Stadium: Jassim bin Hamad Stadium; Referee: Mohammed Al-Sherif

30 January 2025 Round 14	Al-Arabi SC	1–3	Al Sadd	Doha
18:45	Alaaeldin 18'	Report	Mújica 54', 88'; Akram Afif 76' (pen.)	Stadium: Al Thumama Stadium; Referee: Mohammed Al-Shammari

7 February 2025 Round 15	Umm Salal SC	0–1	Al Sadd	Doha
18:45		Report	Akram Afif 6'	Stadium: Grand Hamad Stadium; Referee: Abdulla Al Marri

22 February 2025 Round 16	Al Sadd	2–0	Al-Duhail SC	Doha
19:00	Mostafa Meshaal 70'; Mújica 90+5'	Report		Stadium: Jassim bin Hamad Stadium; Referee: Salman Ahmad Falahi

27 February 2025 Round 17	Al-Gharafa SC	0–4	Al Sadd	Doha
16:45		Report	Akram Afif 25'; Mújica 55', 70', 77'	Stadium: Thani bin Jassim Stadium; Referee: Mohamed Al-Shammari

7 March 2025 Round 18	Al Shahaniya SC	0–5	Al Sadd	Doha
21:30		Report	Giovanni 33', 45+3'; Mújica 53'; Akram Afif 59' (pen.), 83'	Stadium: Suheim bin Hamad Stadium; Referee: Mohammed Al-Sherif

29 March 2025 Round 19	Al Sadd	3–0	Al-Wakrah	Doha
21:00	Akram Afif 72' (pen.), 86' (pen.); Atal 90+10'	Report		Stadium: Jassim bin Hamad Stadium; Referee: Abdulhadi Al Ruaile

5 April 2025 Round 20	Al-Rayyan	1–2	Al Sadd	Al Rayyan
20:15	Bareiro 56'	Report	Mújica 67'; Giovanni 69'	Stadium: Ahmad bin Ali Stadium; Referee: Abdulrahman Al Jassim

11 April 2025 Round 21	Al Sadd	3–0	Al-Khor	Doha
19:30	Mújica 17'; Akram Afif 41' (pen.), 63'	Report		Stadium: Jassim bin Hamad Stadium; Referee: Mohammed Al-Sherif

18 April 2025 Round 22	Al Sadd	5–0	Al-Ahli	Doha
19:30	Akram Afif 13' (pen.); Mostafa Meshaal 44'; Otávio 45+2'; Mújica 67'; Claudinho 81'	Report		Stadium: Jassim bin Hamad Stadium; Referee: Abdullah Al Athbah

=== Emir of Qatar Cup ===
6 May 2025 Round of 16	Al Sadd SC	3–1	Al Kharaitiyat	Doha
20:15	Giovanni 24', 57'; Mújica 55'	Report	Anne 14'	Stadium: Al Thumama Stadium; Referee: Mohamed Ahmed Al Mazid
Note: Lineup for Al Sadd SC – Barsham, Suhail, Otávio, Tarek Salman (substituted off) 66' (Camara, (substituted on) 66'), Al-Yazidi (substituted off) 65' (Pedro Miguel, (substituted on) 65'), Mostafa Meshaal, Assadalla, Claudinho (substituted off) 81' (Hashim Ali, (substituted on) 81'), Giovanni (substituted off) 74' (Al-Haidos, (substituted on) 74'), Akram Afif, Mújica.

14 May 2025 Quarter-finals	Al-Gharafa SC	2–2 (a.e.t.) (5–4 p)	Al Sadd SC	Doha
17:15	Joselu 45+3' (pen.); Brahimi 53' (pen.)	Report	Gunnarsson 67'; Khoukhi 90+9'	Stadium: Al Thumama Stadium; Referee: Mohammed Al-Shammari
	Penalties
	Joselu (penalty scored); Muntari (penalty scored); Sassi (penalty scored); Gunnarsson (penalty scored); Al Ganehi (penalty missed); Hamed (penalty scored)		(penalty scored) Al-Haidos; (penalty scored) Akram Afif; (penalty scored) Mújica; (penalty scored) Khoukhi; (penalty missed) Claudinho; (penalty missed) Pedro Miguel

=== Qatar Cup ===
22 April 2025 Semi-finals	Al Sadd SC	3–0	Al Ahli	Doha
19:00	Mitrović 30' (o.g.); Salman 76'; Mújica 82'	Report		Stadium: Jassim bin Hamad Stadium; Referee: Abdulhadi Al Ruaile

10 May 2025 Final	Al Sadd SC	2–2 (a.e.t.) (4–3 p)	Al-Duhail	Doha
19:00	Claudinho 63' (pen.); Mújica 86'	Report	Olunga 49'; Bourigeaud 65'	Stadium: Jassim bin Hamad Stadium; Referee: Ali Al Ali (Saudi Arabia)
	Penalties
	Al-Haidos (penalty scored); Akram Afif (penalty scored); Mújica (penalty scored); Pedro Miguel (penalty missed); Claudinho (penalty scored)		(penalty scored) Almoez Ali; (penalty scored) Ziyech; (penalty scored) Bourigeaud; (penalty missed) Olunga; (penalty missed) Boudiaf

=== AFC Champions League ===
==== Group stage ====
Pos	Team	Pld	W	D	L	GF	GA	GD	Pts	Qualification
1	(Saudi Arabia) Al-Hilal	8	7	1	0	26	7	+19	22	Advance to round of 16
2	(Saudi Arabia) Al-Ahli	8	7	1	0	21	8	+13	22	Advance to round of 16
3	(Saudi Arabia) Al-Nassr	8	5	2	1	17	6	+11	17	Advance to round of 16
4	(Qatar) Al-Sadd	8	3	3	2	10	9	+1	12	Advance to round of 16
5	(United Arab Emirates) Al Wasl	8	3	2	3	8	12	−4	11	Advance to round of 16
6	(Iran) Esteghlal	8	2	3	3	8	9	−1	9	Advance to round of 16
7	(Qatar) Al-Rayyan	8	2	2	4	8	12	−4	8	Advance to round of 16
8	(Uzbekistan) Pakhtakor	8	1	4	3	4	6	−2	7	Advance to round of 16
9	(Iran) Persepolis	8	1	4	3	6	10	−4	7	
10	(Qatar) Al-Gharafa	8	2	1	5	10	18	−8	7	
11	(Iraq) Al-Shorta	8	1	3	4	7	17	−10	6	
12	(United Arab Emirates) Al Ain	8	0	2	6	11	22	−11	2	

Source: Asian Football Confederation

16 September 2024 1	Al Ain (United Arab Emirates)	1–1	(Qatar) Al-Sadd	Al Ain
20:00 UTC+4	Palacios 80'	Report	Akram Afif 45+1'	Stadium: Hazza bin Zayed Stadium; Attendance: 18,926; Referee: Sadullo Gulmurodi (Tajikistan)

30 September 2024 2	Al-Sadd (Qatar)	2–0	(Iran) Esteghlal	Doha
19:00 UTC+3	Hosseini 40' (o.g.); Akram Afif 68' (pen.)	Report		Stadium: Jassim bin Hamad Stadium; Attendance: 6,599; Referee: Kim Jong-hyeok (South Korea)

21 October 2024 3	Al-Sadd (Qatar)	1–0	(Iran) Persepolis	Doha
19:00 UTC+3	Uribe 45+2'	Report		Stadium: Jassim bin Hamad Stadium; Attendance: 4,071; Referee: Yusuke Araki (Japan)

4 November 2024 4	Al Wasl (United Arab Emirates)	1–1	(Qatar) Al-Sadd	Dubai
18:00 UTC+4	Pérez 29'	Report	Saïss 61'	Stadium: Zabeel Stadium; Attendance: 3,376; Referee: Nazmi Nasaruddin (Malaysia)

26 November 2024 5	Al-Sadd (Qatar)	1–1	(Saudi Arabia) Al-Hilal	Doha
19:00 UTC+3	Otávio 71'	Report	Al-Bulaihi 10'	Stadium: Jassim bin Hamad Stadium; Attendance: 11,327; Referee: Kim Jong-hyeok (South Korea)

2 December 2024 6	Al-Nassr (Saudi Arabia)	1–2	(Qatar) Al-Sadd	Riyadh
21:00 UTC+3	Saïss 80' (o.g.)	Report	Afif 53'; Ounas 90+9' (pen.)	Stadium: Al-Awwal Park; Attendance: 13,091; Referee: Yusuke Araki (Japan)

3 February 2025 7	Al-Sadd (Qatar)	1–3	(Saudi Arabia) Al-Ahli	Doha
19:00 UTC+3	Afif 1'	Report	Firmino 10'; Ibañez 39'; Mahrez 81'	Stadium: Jassim bin Hamad Stadium; Attendance: 9,335; Referee: Adel Ali Ahmed Khamis Al Naqbi (United Arab Emirates)

17 February 2025 8	Pakhtakor (Uzbekistan)	2–1	(Qatar) Al-Sadd	Tashkent (Note: Pakhtakor played their home matches at Bunyodkor Stadium, Tashkent, instead of their regular home stadium Pakhtakor Central Stadium, Tashkent.)
19:00 UTC+5	Riascos 18', 56'	Report	Al-Haydos 37' (pen.)	Stadium: Bunyodkor Stadium; Attendance: 5,000; Referee: Shaun Evans (Australia)

=== Knockout stage ===
==== Round of 16 ====
3 March 2025 First leg	Al-Wasl (United Arab Emirates)	1–1	(Qatar) Al Sadd SC	Dubai
22:00 UTC+4	Saleh 3'	Report	Al-Yazidi 68'	Stadium: Zabeel Stadium; Attendance: 3,188; Referee: Nazmi Nasaruddin (Malaysia)

10 March 2025 Second leg	Al Sadd SC (Qatar)	3–1	(United Arab Emirates) Al-Wasl	Al Rayyan
21:00 UTC+3	Meshaal 26'; Atal 30'; Afif 37'	Report	Lima 10'	Stadium: Jassim bin Hamad Stadium; Attendance: 8,693; Referee: Majed Al-Shamrani (Saudi Arabia)

==== Quarter-finals ====
27 April 2025	Kawasaki Frontale (Japan)	3–2 (a.e.t.)	(Qatar) Al Sadd SC	Jeddah
19:30 UTC+3	Erison 4'; Marcinho 21'; Wakizaka 98'	Report	Otávio 9'; Claudinho 71'	Stadium: Prince Abdullah Al-Faisal Sports City; Attendance: 2,873; Referee: Ma Ning (China)

== Squad information ==
=== Appearances and goals ===
As of 27 April 2025

No.	Pos	Player	Nat	QSL			Emir of Qatar Cup			Qatar Cup			Champions League			Total		
No.	Pos	Player	Nat	App	St	G	App	St	G	App	St	G	App	St	G	App	St	G
Goalkeepers
1	GK	Saad Al Sheeb	(Qatar)	2	2	0	0	0	0	0	0	0	1	1	0	3	3	0
22	GK	Meshaal Barsham	(Qatar)	19	19	0	0	0	0	0	0	0	10	10	0	29	29	0
31	GK	Youssef Abdullah	(Qatar)	1	1	0	0	0	0	0	0	0	0	0	0	1	1	0
Defenders
2	DF	Pedro Miguel	(Qatar)	17	15	1	0	0	0	0	0	0	6	5	0	23	20	1
5	DF	Tarek Salman	(Qatar)	19	19	0	0	0	0	0	0	0	10	8	0	29	27	0
6	DF	Paulo Otávio	(Brazil)	16	16	1	0	0	0	0	0	0	9	8	2	25	24	2
16	DF	Boualem Khoukhi	(Qatar)	16	12	1	0	0	0	0	0	0	11	11	0	27	23	1
29	DF	Romain Saïss	(Morocco)	5	4	1	0	0	0	0	0	0	6	6	1	11	10	2
37	DF	Ahmed Suhail	(Qatar)	13	10	1	0	0	0	0	0	0	5	1	0	18	11	1
66	DF	Abdulrahman Al-Ameen	(Qatar)	0	0	0	0	0	0	0	0	0	0	0	0	0	0	0
70	DF	Musab Kheder	(Qatar)	7	2	0	0	0	0	0	0	0	1	0	0	8	2	0
77	DF	Youcef Atal	(Algeria)	6	5	1	0	0	0	0	0	0	10	10	1	16	15	2
81	DF	Abdessamed Bounacer	(Algeria)	4	0	0	0	0	0	0	0	0	1	1	0	5	1	0
Midfielders
3	MF	Ahmed Sayyar	(Qatar)	1	0	0	0	0	0	0	0	0	1	0	0	2	0	0
4	MF	Mohamed Camara	(Mali)	17	16	0	0	0	0	0	0	0	10	10	0	27	26	0
7	MF	Mohammed Waad	(Qatar)	9	8	2	0	0	0	0	0	0	6	3	0	15	11	2
8	MF	Ali Assadalla	(Qatar)	13	1	0	0	0	0	0	0	0	1	1	0	14	2	0
13	MF	Abdullah Al-Yazidi	(Qatar)	13	9	0	0	0	0	0	0	0	6	1	1	19	10	1
14	MF	Mostafa Meshaal	(Qatar)	17	12	3	0	0	0	0	0	0	8	6	1	25	18	4
18	MF	Guilherme Torres	(Brazil)	5	5	0	0	0	0	0	0	0	7	5	0	12	10	0
33	MF	Claudinho	(Brazil)	9	9	1	0	0	0	0	0	0	4	4	1	13	13	2
96	MF	Adam Ounas	(Algeria)	–	–	–	0	0	0	0	0	0	5	1	1	5	1	1
Forwards
9	FW	Yusuf Abdurisag	(Qatar)	17	4	1	0	0	0	0	0	0	4	3	0	21	7	0
10	FW	Hassan Al-Haidos	(Qatar)	19	6	3	0	0	0	0	0	0	6	1	1	25	7	4
11	FW	Akram Afif	(Qatar)	22	20	18	0	0	0	0	0	0	10	10	5	32	30	23
17	FW	Cristo González	(Spain)	10	9	3	0	0	0	0	0	0	10	6	0	20	15	3
19	FW	Rafa Mújica	(Spain)	18	18	18	0	0	0	0	0	0	7	6	0	25	24	18
21	FW	Giovanni Henrique	(Brazil)	20	14	4	0	0	0	0	0	0	4	0	0	24	14	4
23	FW	Hashim Ali	(Qatar)	12	3	0	0	0	0	0	0	0	2	0	0	14	3	0
Players transferred out during the season
~~88~~	MF	Mateus Uribe	(Colombia)	6	3	0	0	0	0	0	0	0	5	3	1	11	6	1
Total				22		62	0		0	0		0	11		16	33		78

Last updated: 27 April 2025
Source: Soccerway

=== Goalscorers ===
As of 14 May 2025

Includes all competitive matches. The list is sorted alphabetically by surname when total goals are equal.

No.	Nat.	Player	Pos.	QSL	QEC	QC	CL 1	TOTAL
84	(Qatar)	Akram Afif	LW / RW	18	0	0	5	23
19	(Spain)	Rafa Mújica	CF	18	1	2	0	21
21	(Brazil)	Giovanni Henrique	RW	4	2	0	0	6
10	(Qatar)	Hassan Al-Haidos	RW / LW / AM	3	0	0	1	4
14	(Qatar)	Mostafa Meshaal	MF	3	0	0	1	4
17	(Spain)	Cristo González	SS	3	0	0	0	3
6	(Brazil)	Paulo Otávio	DF	1	0	0	2	3
33	(Brazil)	Claudinho	MF	1	0	1	1	3
7	(Qatar)	Mohammed Waad	MF	2	0	0	0	2
29	(Morocco)	Romain Saïss	DF	1	0	0	1	2
77	(Algeria)	Youcef Atal	DF	1	0	0	1	2
16	(Qatar)	Boualem Khoukhi	CB	1	1	0	0	2
2	(Qatar)	Pedro Miguel	CB	1	0	0	0	1
88	(Colombia)	Mateus Uribe	MF	0	0	0	1	1
37	(Qatar)	Ahmed Suhail	DF	1	0	0	0	1
9	(Qatar)	Yusuf Abdurisag	CF	1	0	0	0	1
96	(Algeria)	Adam Ounas	MF	0	0	0	1	1
13	(Qatar)	Abdullah Al-Yazidi	DF	0	0	0	1	1
5	(Qatar)	Tarek Salman	DF	0	0	1	0	1
Own Goals				3	1	1	1	6
Totals				62	5	5	16	88

=== Assists ===
As of 14 May 2025

No.	Nat.	Player	Pos.	QSL	QEC	QC	CL 1	TOTAL
84	(Qatar)	Akram Afif	LW / RW	14	2	0	3	19
17	(Spain)	Cristo González	SS	3	0	0	1	4
6	(Brazil)	Paulo Otávio	LB	3	0	1	0	4
9	(Qatar)	Yusuf Abdurisag	FW	3	0	0	0	3
77	(Algeria)	Youcef Atal	DF	2	0	0	1	3
14	(Qatar)	Mostafa Meshaal	MF	2	0	0	1	3
13	(Qatar)	Abdullah Al-Yazidi	DF	3	0	0	0	3
11	(Brazil)	Claudinho	AM	1	0	1	1	3
16	(Qatar)	Boualem Khoukhi	DF	1	0	0	1	2
21	(Brazil)	Giovanni Henrique	FW	1	0	0	1	2
10	(Qatar)	Hassan Al-Haidos	MF	1	1	0	0	2
23	(Qatar)	Hashim Ali	FW	1	0	0	0	1
88	(Colombia)	Mateus Uribe	MF	1	0	0	0	1
18	(Brazil)	Guilherme Torres	MF	1	0	0	0	1
7	(Qatar)	Mohammed Waad	MF	1	0	0	0	1
4	(Mali)	Mohamed Camara	MF	1	0	0	0	1
8	(Qatar)	Ali Assadalla	MF	1	0	0	0	1
2	(Qatar)	Pedro Miguel	DF	1	0	0	0	1
5	(Qatar)	Tarek Salman	DF	0	1	0	0	1
29	(Morocco)	Romain Saïss	DF	1	0	0	0	1
Totals				42	4	2	9	57

=== Clean sheets ===
As of 14 May 2025

Includes all competitive matches.

					Clean sheets				
No.	Nat	Name	GP	GA	QSL	QEC	QC	CL 1	Total
22	(Qatar)	Meshaal Barsham	33	33	10	0	1	2	13
1	(Qatar)	Saad Al Sheeb	3	7	0	0	0	0	0
31	(Qatar)	Youssef Abdullah	1	2	0	0	0	0	0
		TOTALS		42	10	0	1	2	13
