= 2013–14 Eintracht Frankfurt season =

Eintracht Frankfurt
2013–14 season
- Chairman: Heribert Bruchhagen
- Manager: Armin Veh
- Bundesliga: 13th
- DFB-Pokal: Quarter-finals
- UEFA Europa League: Round of 32
- Top goalscorer: League: Joselu (9); All: Alexander Meier (15)
- Highest home attendance: 51,500 (sold out) on three occasions (league)
- Lowest home attendance: 40,500 8 February 2014 v Eintracht Braunschweig (league)
- Average home league attendance: 47,053
Home colours	Away colours	Third colours

The 2013–14 Eintracht Frankfurt season was the club's 114th season in its history. In 2013–14, the club played in the Bundesliga, the top tier of German football, the club's second season back in this league and its 45th overall. The club also participated in the UEFA Europa League, where it began in the play-off round and reached the round of 32.

== Matches ==
=== Legend ===
Win Draw Loss Postponed

=== Friendlies ===
6 July 2013	SKN St. Pölten	2–3	Eintracht Frankfurt	Sankt Pölten, Austria
18:00 CEST	Schibany 31'; Noel 84'	(Report)	Lakić 14'; Meier 17'; Wisio 78' (o.g.)	Stadium: NV Arena; Attendance: 2,500; Referee: Hameter

10 July 2013	SV Buchonia Flieden (1st half) / Flieden regional XI (2nd half)	0–11	Eintracht Frankfurt	Flieden, Germany
18:30 CEST		(Report)	Joselu 9', 16', 29', 64', 74'; Meier 12'; Flum 49'; Lanig 52', 78'; Lakić 61', 66'	Stadium: Königreich-Stadion; Attendance: 3,600; Referee: Müller

13 July 2013	Eintracht Frankfurt	4–1	VfR Aalen	Frankfurt, Germany
16:00 CEST	Aigner 52'; Joselu 53', 82'; Stendera 68'	(Report)	Barth 15'	Stadium: Sportpark Frankfurt-Hoechst; Attendance: 3,000; Referee: Tobias Welz

19 July 2013	Eintracht Frankfurt	5–1	Bursaspor	Schwaz, Austria
18:30 CEST	Flum 12', 36'; Oczipka 18'; Rosenthal 22'; Lakić 80'		Ünal 80'	Stadium: Sportzentrum Schwaz; Attendance: 400

23 July 2013	Eintracht Frankfurt	3–2	Kayserispor	Längenfeld, Austria
18:00 CEST	Meier 65'; Simić 80' (o.g.); Waldschmidt 85'	(Report)	Nobre 12'; Khizanishvili 20'	Stadium: Stadion Längenfeld; Attendance: 500

27 July 2013	Luxembourg national team	1–4	Eintracht Frankfurt	Differdange, Luxembourg
17:00 CEST	Turpel 11'		Meier 10'; Flum 57'; Lanig 76'; Lakić 82'	Stadium: Stade Municipal de la Ville de Differdange; Attendance: 1,800; Referee: Sven Bindels

7 September 2013	FSV Frankfurt	2–3	Eintracht Frankfurt	Frankfurt, Germany
14:00 CEST	Djengoue 70'; Epstein 89'		Inui 16', 78'; Schröck 62'	Stadium: Stadion am Bornheimer Hang; Attendance: 4,278; Referee: Martin Petersen

16 November 2013	SV Traisa	0–9	Eintracht Frankfurt	Mühltal, Germany
14:00 CEST			Kittel 12'; Joselu 29'; Lanig 38', 63'; Waldschmidt 49', 50'; Lakić 80'; Genzgiher 82'; Oczipka 83'	Stadium: Datron-Arena; Attendance: 800; Referee: Lukas Müller

11 January 2013	Eintracht Frankfurt	2–3	Schalke 04	Abu Dhabi, United Arab Emirates
13:00 CEST	Rosenthal 18'; Joselu 46'	(Report)	Farfán 44', 65'; Boateng 57'	Stadium: Al Nahyan Stadium; Attendance: 500; Referee: Naqbi

16 January 2013	Eintracht Frankfurt	0–1	Shakhtar Donetsk	Abu Dhabi, United Arab Emirates
14:00 CEST		(Report)	Teixeira 14'	Stadium: Al Nahyan Stadium; Referee: Ali Salem

19 January 2013	Eintracht Frankfurt	2–0	Wisła Kraków	Frankfurt, Germany
15:00 CEST	Meier 15', 34' (pen.)	(Report)		Stadium: Commerzbank-Arena; Attendance: Private match

12 May 2014	VfB Schrecksbach	3–9	Eintracht Frankfurt	Schrecksbach, Germany
18:30 CEST	Petersohn 51'; Reitz 55'; Langhof 70'	(Report)	Kadlec 7'; Russ 10'; Stendera 30'; Lanig 33'; Waldschmidt 53', 68', 77'; Joselu 58'; Oczipka 65'	Stadium: Metzenbergstadion; Attendance: 3,400

13 May 2014	1. FC Langen	2–10	Eintracht Frankfurt	Langen, Germany
18:30 CEST	Joselu 5'; Aigner 32', 34', 44'; Inui 50'; Kadlec 59'; 61' (o.g.); Madlung 62', 70'; Stendera 89'	(Report)	Özkan 39'; Frick 85'	Stadium: Waldstadion

14 May 2014	Alemannia Groß-Rohrheim	2–14	Eintracht Frankfurt	Groß-Rohrheim, Germany
18:30 CEST	Malik 13'; Schulz 90'	(Report)	Russ 9', 26'; Rosenthal 15'; Aigner 32', 45'; Joselu 38', 88'; Findik 54'; Madlung 58', 62', 76', 76', 78'; Oczipka 85'	Stadium: Sportplatz Groß-Rohrheim; Attendance: 1,600

15 May 2014	SV Oberdorfelden 1967	1–19	Eintracht Frankfurt	Schöneck, Germany
18:30 CEST	Braun 19'	(Report)	Joselu 3', 39', 43', 55', 66'; Madlung 12', 16', 30', 41'; Stendera 22', 23', 45', 67', 83'; Almpanis 37', 60'; Celozzi 52'; Findik 74'; Azouaghi 78'	Attendance: 2,200

=== Bundesliga ===
==== League table ====
Pos	Team	Pld	W	D	L	GF	GA	GD	Pts
11	Hertha BSC	34	11	8	15	40	48	−8	41
12	Werder Bremen	34	10	9	15	42	66	−24	39
13	Eintracht Frankfurt	34	9	9	16	40	57	−17	36
14	SC Freiburg	34	9	9	16	43	61	−18	36
15	VfB Stuttgart	34	8	8	18	49	62	−13	32

Source: DFB
Rules for classification: 1) points; 2) goal difference; 3) number of goals scored.

==== Results summary ====
Overall								Home						Away					
Pld	W	D	L	GF	GA	GD	Pts	W	D	L	GF	GA	GD	W	D	L	GF	GA	GD
34	9	9	16	40	57	−17	36	5	5	7	22	24	−2	4	4	9	18	33	−15

Source: Competitive matches

==== Results by round ====
Round	1	2	3	4	5	6	7	8	9	10	11	12	13	14	15	16	17	18	19	20	21	22	23	24	25	26	27	28	29	30	31	32	33	34
Ground	A	H	A	H	A	A	H	A	H	A	H	A	H	A	H	A	H	H	A	H	A	H	H	A	H	A	H	A	H	A	H	A	H	A
Result	L	L	W	L	W	D	D	D	D	L	L	L	D	L	L	W	D	W	L	W	L	D	W	D	L	W	W	L	W	L	L	D	L	L
Position	18	18	11	15	13	13	13	13	12	14	15	15	15	15	15	15	15	13	14	12	12	13	12	13	13	12	11	11	11	11	12	11	13	13

Source: kicker.de
A = Away; H = Home; W = Win; D = Draw; L = Loss

==== Matches ====
10 August 2013 1	Hertha BSC	6–1	Eintracht Frankfurt	Berlin
15:30 CEST	Ramos 18', 71'; Brooks 32'; Allagui 58', 60'; Ronny 89'	(Report)	Flum (yellow card) 24'; Zambrano (yellow card) 33'; Meier 37' (pen.)	Stadium: Olympiastadion; Attendance: 54,376; Referee: Michael Weiner

17 August 2013 2	Eintracht Frankfurt	0–1	Bayern Munich	Frankfurt
15:30 CEST	Aigner (yellow card) 90+2'	(Report)	Mandžukić 13'; Dante (yellow card) 55'	Stadium: Commerzbank-Arena; Attendance: 51,500; Referee: Peter Gagelmann

25 August 2013 3	Eintracht Braunschweig	0–2	Eintracht Frankfurt	Braunschweig
15:30 CEST	Theuerkauf (yellow card) 53'; Kratz (yellow card) 55'	(Report)	Meier 52', (yellow card) 74'; Aigner 62'	Stadium: Eintracht-Stadion; Attendance: 23,325; Referee: Wolfgang Stark

1 September 2013 4	Eintracht Frankfurt	1–2	Borussia Dortmund	Frankfurt
17:30 CEST	Kadlec 36'	(Report)	Mkhitaryan 10', 56'	Stadium: Commerzbank-Arena; Attendance: 51,500; Referee: Manuel Gräfe

14 September 2013 5	Werder Bremen	0–3	Eintracht Frankfurt	Bremen
15:30 CEST	Di Santo (red card) 26'; Caldirola (yellow card) 33'; Makiadi (yellow card) 64'	(Report)	Kadlec 14', 34'; Prödl 77' (o.g.)	Stadium: Weserstadion; Attendance: 40,060; Referee: Felix Brych

22 September 2013 6	VfB Stuttgart	1–1	Eintracht Frankfurt	Stuttgart
17:30 CEST	Werner 16'; Kvist (yellow card) 28'; Sakai (yellow card) 61'; Harnik (yellow card) 87'	(Report)	Russ 14'; Djakpa (yellow card) 39'; Anderson Bamba (yellow card) 90+5'	Stadium: Mercedes-Benz Arena; Attendance: 44,810; Referee: Felix Zwayer

28 September 2013 7	Eintracht Frankfurt	2–2	Hamburger SV	Frankfurt
18:30 CEST	Flum 31'; Russ 54', (yellow card) 90+1'; Oczipka (yellow card) 82'	(Report)	Lasogga 45+3'; Arslan (yellow card) 46'; Jansen 86'	Stadium: Commerzbank-Arena; Attendance: 50,700; Referee: Thorsten Kinhöfer

6 October 2013 8	SC Freiburg	1–1	Eintracht Frankfurt	Freiburg
17:30 CEST	Schmid (yellow card) 75'; Höfler 85'; Schuster (yellow card) 90'	(Report)	Djakpa (yellow card) 48'; Günter 64' (o.g.); Flum (yellow card) 80' (yellow-red card) 90'; Russ (yellow card) 90'	Stadium: Dreisamstadion; Attendance: 23,300; Referee: Deniz Aytekin

19 October 2013 9	Eintracht Frankfurt	1–1	1. FC Nürnberg	Frankfurt
15:30 CEST	Anderson Bamba (yellow card) 37'; Kadlec 50'; Zambrano (yellow card) 67'	(Report)	Pekhart (yellow card) 26'; Nilsson (yellow card) 73'; Drmić 86'; Čolak (yellow card) 90'	Stadium: Commerzbank-Arena; Attendance: 50,200; Referee: Christian Dingert

27 October 2013 10	Borussia Mönchengladbach	4–1	Eintracht Frankfurt	Mönchengladbach
17:30 CEST	Arango 11', (yellow card) 38'; Wendt 18'; Kruse (yellow card) 54'; Herrmann 60'; Raffael 66'	(Report)	Aigner 15', (yellow card) 29'; Zambrano (yellow card) 30'; Rode (yellow card) 62'; Jung (yellow card) 79'	Stadium: Borussia-Park; Attendance: 53,418; Referee: Felix Zwayer

2 November 2013 11	Eintracht Frankfurt	1–2	VfL Wolfsburg	Frankfurt
18:30 CEST	Meier 35'; Oczipka (yellow card) 37'; Celozzi (yellow card) 87'; Zambrano (yellow card) 90+2'	(Report)	Anderson Bamba 2' (o.g.); Luiz Gustavo (yellow card) 34'; Arnold 82'; Schäfer (yellow card) 90+3'	Stadium: Commerzbank-Arena; Attendance: 44,300; Referee: Marco Fritz

10 November 2013 12	Mainz 05	1–0	Eintracht Frankfurt	Mainz
15:30 CEST	Geis (yellow card) 16'; Soto (yellow card) 41'; Bell (yellow card) 66'; Choupo-Moting (yellow card) 83', (goal) 88'	(Report)	Flum (yellow card) 48'	Stadium: Coface Arena; Attendance: 34,000; Referee: Michael Weiner

23 November 2013 13	Eintracht Frankfurt	3–3	Schalke 04	Frankfurt
15:30 CEST	Rode (yellow card) 22'; Zambrano (yellow card) 37'; Trapp (yellow card) 42'; Flum 56'; Joselu 61', 68'; Russ (yellow card) 63'	(Report)	Flum 14' (o.g.); Matip 18'; Höwedes 86'	Stadium: Commerzbank-Arena; Attendance: 51,500; Referee: Markus Schmidt

1 December 2013 14	Hannover 96	2–0	Eintracht Frankfurt	Hanover
15:30 CEST	Diouf 25'; Marcelo (yellow card) 48'; Huszti 67'	(Report)	Barnetta (yellow card) 35'; Lanig (yellow card) 42' (yellow-red card) 57'; Zambrano (yellow card) 50'	Stadium: AWD-Arena; Attendance: 40,700; Referee: Günter Perl

7 December 2013 15	Eintracht Frankfurt	1–2	1899 Hoffenheim	Frankfurt
15:30 CEST	Flum (yellow card) 32'; Schwegler (yellow card) 36'; Joselu 48', (yellow card) 76'; Rode (yellow card) 83'; Anderson Bamba (yellow card) 90+1'	(Report)	Schipplock 46'; Roberto Firmino 51', (yellow card) 78'; Volland (yellow card) 76'	Stadium: Commerzbank-Arena; Attendance: 41,300; Referee: Peter Sippel

15 December 2013 16	Bayer Leverkusen	0–1	Eintracht Frankfurt	Leverkusen
17:30 CEST	Kießling (yellow card) 10'; Hegeler (yellow card) 70'; Rolfes (yellow card) 86'; Wollscheid (yellow card) 87'	(Report)	Russ 61'	Stadium: BayArena; Attendance: 26,242; Referee: Wolfgang Stark

20 December 2013 17	Eintracht Frankfurt	1–1	FC Augsburg	Frankfurt
15:30 CEST	Flum (yellow card) 10'; Rosenthal 42'; Rode (yellow card) 74'; Schwegler (yellow card) 79'	(Report)	Baier (yellow card) 8'; Bobadilla 33'; Vogt (yellow card) 40'	Stadium: Commerzbank-Arena; Attendance: 46,400; Referee: Michael Weiner

25 January 2014 18	Eintracht Frankfurt	1–0	Hertha BSC	Frankfurt
18:30 CEST	Zambrano (yellow card) 21'; Meier 36'; Schwegler (yellow card) 90+1'	(Report)	Ramos (yellow card) 26'; Ronny (yellow card) 72'; Skjelbred (yellow card) 75'	Stadium: Commerzbank-Arena; Attendance: 41,600; Referee: Jochen Drees

2 February 2014 19	Bayern Munich	5–0	Eintracht Frankfurt	Munich
17:30 CEST	Götze 12'; Ribéry 44'; Robben 67'; Dante 69'; Mandžukić 89'	(Report)		Stadium: Allianz Arena; Attendance: 71,000; Referee: Florian Meyer

8 February 2014 20	Eintracht Frankfurt	3–0	Eintracht Braunschweig	Frankfurt
15:30 CEST	Flum 7'; Meier 43', (yellow card) 80'; Aigner 44'; Jung (yellow card) 73'	(Report)	Theuerkauf (yellow card) 74'	Stadium: Commerzbank-Arena; Attendance: 40,500; Referee: Markus Schmidt

15 February 2014 21	Borussia Dortmund	4–0	Eintracht Frankfurt	Dortmund
15:30 CEST	Aubameyang 10', 21'; Lewandowski 47' (pen.); Jojić 68'; Şahin (yellow card) 83'	(Report)	Kempf (yellow card) 70'; Russ (yellow card) 83'; Schröck (yellow card) 85'	Stadium: Westfalenstadion; Attendance: 80,000; Referee: Peter Sippel

23 February 2014 22	Eintracht Frankfurt	0–0	Werder Bremen	Frankfurt
15:30 CEST	Schwegler (yellow card) 20'	(Report)	Kroos (yellow card) 20' (yellow-red card) 34'; Caldirola (yellow card) 60'; Prödl (yellow card) 73'; Bargfrede (yellow card) 90+2'	Stadium: Commerzbank-Arena; Attendance: 44,300; Referee: Felix Zwayer

2 March 2014 23	Eintracht Frankfurt	2–1	VfB Stuttgart	Frankfurt
17:30 CEST	Jung (yellow card) 52'; Rosenthal 80'; Meier 89'	(Report)	Harnik 31'; Niedermeier (yellow card) 76'	Stadium: Commerzbank-Arena; Attendance: 43,200; Referee: Deniz Aytekin

8 March 2014 24	Hamburger SV	1–1	Eintracht Frankfurt	Hamburg
15:30 CEST	Westermann (yellow card) 58'; Badelj (yellow card) 66'; Çalhanoğlu 72' (pen.); Zoua (yellow card) 79'	(Report)	Madlung 29'; Barnetta (yellow card) 42'; Djakpa (yellow card) 60'; Zambrano (yellow card) 71'	Stadium: Volksparkstadion; Attendance: 51,191; Referee: Michael Weiner

16 March 2014 25	Eintracht Frankfurt	1–4	SC Freiburg	Frankfurt
17:30 CEST	Schwegler (yellow card) 58'; Joselu 59', (yellow card) 83'	(Report)	Schmid (yellow card) 30'; Schuster 34', (yellow card) 61'; Guédé 54', 90'; Mehmedi (yellow card) 60'; Fernandes (yellow card) 67'; Klaus 70'; Krmaš (yellow card) 79'	Stadium: Commerzbank-Arena; Attendance: 45,400; Referee: Wolfgang Stark

23 March 2014 26	1. FC Nürnberg	2–5	Eintracht Frankfurt	Nuremberg
15:30 CEST	Drmić 64'; Campaña 71'; Pinola (red card) 80'	(Report)	Barnetta 21'; Joselu 49', 88'; Madlung 53'; Kadlec 90+2'; Flum (yellow card) 90+3'	Stadium: Frankenstadion; Attendance: 40,079; Referee: Knut Kircher

26 March 2014 27	Eintracht Frankfurt	1–0	Borussia Mönchengladbach	Frankfurt
20:00 CEST	Joselu 16'; Russ (yellow card) 45+1'; Flum (yellow card) 56'; Kadlec (yellow card) 86'	(Report)	Daems (yellow card) 50'	Stadium: Commerzbank-Arena; Attendance: 48,000; Referee: Manuel Gräfe

29 March 2014 28	VfL Wolfsburg	2–1	Eintracht Frankfurt	Wolfsburg
15:30 CEST	Luiz Gustavo (yellow card) 37'; Olić 64'; Rodríguez (yellow card) 71'; Naldo 89'	(Report)	Aigner 11'; Djakpa (yellow card) 42'; Flum (yellow card) 68'; Zambrano (yellow card) 79'; Rosenthal (yellow card) 82'	Stadium: Volkswagen Arena; Attendance: 29,159; Referee: Peter Gagelmann

5 April 2014 29	Eintracht Frankfurt	2–0	Mainz 05	Frankfurt
15:30 CEST	Russ (yellow card) 20'; Lanig (yellow card) 45+1'; Joselu 52'; Flum (yellow card) 55'; Meier 85'	(Report)	Zimling (yellow card) 38'; Pospěch (yellow card) 52'; Moritz (yellow card) 55'; Bell (yellow card) 58'	Stadium: Commerzbank-Arena; Attendance: 50,400; Referee: Wolfgang Stark

11 April 2014 30	Schalke 04	2–0	Eintracht Frankfurt	Gelsenkirchen
20:30 CEST	Draxler (yellow card) 27'; Meyer 59'; Farfán 90+1'	(Report)		Stadium: Veltins-Arena; Attendance: 61,973; Referee: Christian Dingert

17 April 2014 31	Eintracht Frankfurt	2–3	Hannover 96	Frankfurt
20:30 CEST	Lanig 13'; Aigner (yellow card) 45+1'; Zambrano (yellow card) 63'; Meier 68'; Madlung (yellow card) 85'; Jung (yellow card) 90+2'	(Report)	Andreasen 2', (yellow card) 89'; Stindl 20'; Ya Konan 29'; Bittencourt (yellow card) 36'; Prib (yellow card) 73'; Zieler (yellow card) 90'	Stadium: Commerzbank-Arena; Attendance: 48,100; Referee: Felix Brych

26 April 2014 32	1899 Hoffenheim	0–0	Eintracht Frankfurt	Sinsheim
15:30 CEST	Modeste (red card) 85'	(Report)	Lanig (yellow card) 24'; Joselu (yellow card) 70'; Schröck (yellow card) 74'; Trapp (yellow card) 84'	Stadium: Rhein-Neckar Arena; Attendance: 30,150; Referee: Florian Meyer

3 May 2014 33	Eintracht Frankfurt	0–2	Bayer Leverkusen	Frankfurt
15:30 CEST	Zambrano (yellow card) 54'; Russ (yellow card) 69'	(Report)	Castro 27'; Can 36'; Spahić (yellow card) 77'	Stadium: Commerzbank-Arena; Attendance: 51,000; Referee: Jochen Drees

10 May 2014 34	FC Augsburg	2–1	Eintracht Frankfurt	Augsburg
15:30 CEST	Klavan 29'; Hahn 80'	(Report)	Joselu 15'; Schwegler (yellow card) 36'; Lanig (yellow card) 67'	Stadium: SGL Arena; Attendance: 30,660; Referee: Daniel Siebert

=== DFB-Pokal ===
4 August 2013 1st Round	FV Illertissen	0–2	Eintracht Frankfurt	Augsburg
18:30 CEST	Hämmerle (yellow card) 69'	(Report)	Joselu 64'; Flum (yellow card) 69'; Schwegler (yellow card) 70'; Rode 90+2'	Stadium: SGL Arena; Attendance: 6,081; Referee: Ittrich

25 September 2013 2nd Round	Eintracht Frankfurt	2–0	VfL Bochum	Frankfurt
19:00 CEST	Inui 23'; Aigner 25', (yellow card) 37'; Kadlec (yellow card) 74'	(Report)	Freier (yellow card) 78'; Eyjólfsson (yellow card) 90'; Ilsø (yellow card) 90'	Stadium: Commerzbank-Arena; Attendance: 28,100; Referee: Guido Winkmann

4 December 2013 3rd Round	Eintracht Frankfurt	4–2	SV Sandhausen	Frankfurt
20:30 CEST	Joselu 19', 49' (pen.), 90+2'; Kadlec 72'	(Report)	Olajengbesi (yellow card) 49'; Rode 64' (o.g.); Tüting 66'; Schulz (yellow card) 72'; Riemann (yellow card) 90+3'	Stadium: Commerzbank-Arena; Attendance: 18,200; Referee: Bastian Dankert

11 February 2014 Quarterfinals	Eintracht Frankfurt	0–1	Borussia Dortmund	Frankfurt
20:45 CEST	Russ (yellow card) 14'; Rode (yellow card) 33'; Flum (yellow card) 72'	(Report)	Papastathopoulos (yellow card) 15'; Schmelzer (yellow card) 77'; Aubameyang 83', (yellow card) 90+2'	Stadium: Commerzbank-Arena; Attendance: 51,500; Referee: Knut Kircher

=== UEFA Europa League ===
Eintracht Frankfurt's opponents in the 2013–14 UEFA Europa League
Red: Eintracht
Yellow: Play-off round
Black: Group stage
Blue: Knockout stage

22 August 2013 Play-off round	Qarabağ	0–2	Eintracht Frankfurt	Baku, Azerbaijan
18:00 CEST	Agolli (yellow card) 45'	(Report)	Meier 6', 75'; Flum (yellow card) 17'; Inui (yellow card) 35'; Lanig (yellow card) 76'	Stadium: Tofiq Bahramov Stadium; Attendance: 30,500; Referee: Szymon Marciniak (Poland)

29 August 2013 Play-off round	Eintracht Frankfurt	2–1	Qarabağ	Frankfurt, Germany
20:30 CEST	Meier 10'; Inui 75'	(Report)	Reynaldo 58'; Medvedev (yellow card) 62'; Almeida (yellow card) 72'	Stadium: Commerzbank-Arena; Attendance: 47,000; Referee: Duarte Gomes (Portugal)

19 September 2013 Group stage day 1	Eintracht Frankfurt	3–0	Bordeaux	Frankfurt, Germany
19:00 CEST	Kadlec 4'; Russ 16', (yellow card) 58'; Djakpa 52'; Celozzi (yellow card) 84'	(Report)	Orbán (red card) 61'; Rolán (yellow card) 82'; Traoré (yellow card) 90+1'	Stadium: Commerzbank-Arena; Attendance: 44,000; Referee: Andre Marriner (England)

3 October 2013 Group stage day 2	APOEL	0–3	Eintracht Frankfurt	Nicosia, Cyprus
21:05 CEST	Gonçalves (yellow card) 18'; Oliveira (yellow card) 64'; João Guilherme (yellow card) 66'; Sotiriou (yellow card) 72'; Borda (yellow card) 90+2'	(Report)	Alexandrou 27' (o.g.); Lakić 59'; Jung 66'	Stadium: GSP Stadium; Attendance: 13,729; Referee: Alexandru Tudor (Romania)

24 October 2013 Group stage day 3	Eintracht Frankfurt	2–0	Maccabi Tel Aviv	Frankfurt, Germany
21:05 CEST	Russ (yellow card) 11'; Kadlec 13'; Zambrano (yellow card) 16'; Meier 54'	(Report	Ben Haim (yellow card) 30' (yellow-red card) 34'; Mitrović (yellow card) 69'	Stadium: Commerzbank-Arena; Attendance: 40,800; Referee: Antonio Damato (Italy)

7 November 2013 Group stage day 4	Maccabi Tel Aviv	4–2	Eintracht Frankfurt	Tel Aviv, Israel
19:00 CEST	Zahavi 14', 90+4' (pen.); Yitzhaki 30', 35'; García (yellow card) 45+2'; Yeini (yellow card) 65'; Ben Harush (yellow card) 68'	(Report)	Zambrano (yellow card) 41'; Lakić (yellow card) 45+2', (goal) 63'; Meier 67' (pen.)	Stadium: Bloomfield Stadium; Attendance: 13,232; Referee: Serge Gumienny (Belgium)

28 November 2013 Group stage day 5	Bordeaux	0–1	Eintracht Frankfurt	Bordeaux, France
21:05 CEST	Poundjé (yellow card) 47'; Faubert (yellow card) 73'	(Report)	Rode (yellow card) 42'; Oczipka (yellow card) 55'; Schwegler (yellow card) 66'; Lanig 83'; Barnetta (yellow card) 84'	Stadium: Stade Chaban-Delmas; Attendance: 19,013; Referee: Alberto Undiano Mallenco (Spain)

12 December 2013 Group stage day 6	Eintracht Frankfurt	2–0	APOEL	Frankfurt, Germany
19:00 CEST	Schröck (yellow card) 35', (goal) 68'; Djakpa 77'	(Report)	Solomou (yellow card) 37'; Vinícius (yellow card) 63'; Manduca (yellow card) 77'; Christian (yellow card) 80'	Stadium: Commerzbank-Arena; Attendance: 32,400; Referee: Stephan Studer (Switzerland)

20 February 2014 Round of 32	Porto	2–2	Eintracht Frankfurt	Porto, Portugal
21:05 CEST	Quaresma 44'; Varela 68'	(Report)	Schwegler (yellow card) 29'; Russ (yellow card) 36'; Joselu 72'; Alex Sandro , 77' (o.g.)	Stadium: Estádio do Dragão; Attendance: 25,107; Referee: Matej Jug (Slovenia)

27 February 2014 Round of 32	Eintracht Frankfurt	3–3	Porto	Frankfurt, Germany
19:00 CEST	Aigner (yellow card) 25', (goal) 37'; Meier 52', 76', (yellow card) 75'; Zambrano (yellow card) 62'; Jung (yellow card) 88'	(Report)	Maicon (yellow card) 41'; Herrera (yellow card) 51'; Mangala 58', 71'; Ghilas (yellow card) 62', (goal) 86'	Stadium: Commerzbank-Arena; Attendance: 48,000; Referee: Björn Kuipers (Netherlands)

=== Indoor soccer tournament (Frankfurt Cup) ===
5 January 2014 1st Match	Eintracht Frankfurt	2–1	SC Paderborn	Frankfurt, Germany
19:06 CEST	Kittel	(Report)	Hartherz	Stadium: Fraport Arena; Attendance: 4,000

5 January 2014 2nd Match	Eintracht Frankfurt	1–3	Kickers Offenbach	Frankfurt, Germany
20:00 CEST	Waldschmidt	(Report)	Pintol; Gjasula; Korb	Stadium: Fraport Arena; Attendance: 4,000

5 January 2014 Semi-final	Eintracht Frankfurt	2–1	SV Wehen Wiesbaden	Frankfurt, Germany
21:00 CEST	Schröck	(Report)		Stadium: Fraport Arena; Attendance: 4,000

5 January 2014 Final	Eintracht Frankfurt	2–4	Greuther Fürth	Frankfurt, Germany
20:00 CEST	Amin; Kempf	(Report)	Azemi; Weilandt; Baba; Füllkrug	Stadium: Fraport Arena; Attendance: 4,000

== Squad ==
=== Squad and statistics ===
As of 16 May 2014

No.	Pos	Nat	Player	Total		Bundesliga		DFB-Pokal		Europa League	
No.	Pos	Nat	Player	Apps	Goals	Apps	Goals	Apps	Goals	Apps	Goals
1	GK	(Germany) GER	Kevin Trapp	45	0	34	0	3	0	8	0
4	DF	(Germany) GER	Marco Russ	38	4	28	3	3	0	7	1
5	DF	(Peru) PER	Carlos Zambrano	42	0	30	0	4	0	8	0
6	DF	(Germany) GER	Bastian Oczipka	24	0	20	0	2	0	2	0
7	MF	(Germany) GER	Jan Rosenthal	25	2	18	2	3	0	4	0
8	MF	(Japan) JPN	Takashi Inui	20	2	13	0	2	1	5	1
9	FW	(Spain) ESP	Joselu	33	14	24	9	2	4	7	1
10	FW	(Czech Republic) CZE	Václav Kadlec	28	7	21	5	3	1	4	1
11	FW	(Croatia) CRO	Srđan Lakić	16	2	8	0	3	0	5	2
13	MF	(Germany) GER	Martin Lanig	21	1	15	0	1	0	5	1
14	MF	(Germany) GER	Alexander Meier	30	15	22	8	2	0	6	7
15	DF	(Ivory Coast) CIV	Constant Djapka	26	2	20	0	2	0	4	2
16	MF	(Germany) GER	Stefan Aigner	37	6	28	4	3	1	6	1
17	DF	(Philippines) PHI	Stephan Schröck	17	1	12	0	2	0	3	1
18	MF	(Germany) GER	Johannes Flum	39	3	26	3	4	0	9	0
19	MF	(Germany) GER	Marvin Bakalorz	3	0	2	0	0	0	1	0
20	MF	(Germany) GER	Sebastian Rode	30	1	19	0	4	1	7	0
21	MF	(Germany) GER	Marc Stendera	5	0	5	0	0	0	0	0
22	DF	(Germany) GER	Stefano Celozzi	15	0	10	0	0	0	5	0
23	DF	(Brazil) BRA	Anderson Bamba	21	0	14	0	1	0	6	0
24	DF	(Germany) GER	Sebastian Jung	39	1	30	0	4	0	5	1
25	MF	(Switzerland) SUI	Tranquillo Barnetta	30	0	22	0	2	0	6	0
26	MF	(Germany) GER	Tobias Weis	5	0	4	0	1	0	0	0
27	MF	(Switzerland) SUI	Pirmin Schwegler	21	1	16	0	2	1	3	0
28	MF	(Germany) GER	Sonny Kittel	1	0	0	0	0	0	1	0
30	GK	(Germany) GER	Felix Wiedwald	2	0	1	0	0	0	1	0
32	GK	(Turkey) TUR	Aykut Özer	1	0	0	0	1	0	0	0
33	DF	(Germany) GER	Alexander Hien	0	0	0	0	0	0	0	0
34	DF	(Germany) GER	Erik Wille	0	0	0	0	0	0	0	0
36	DF	(Germany) GER	Marc-Oliver Kempf	4	0	3	0	0	0	1	0
39	DF	(Germany) GER	Alexander Madlung	18	2	15	2	1	0	2	0

=== Transfers ===
==== Transferred in ====
No.	Pos.	Name	Age	EU	Moving from	Type	Transfer Window	Contract ends	Transfer fee	Sources
4	Defender	Marco Russ	27	Yes	VfL Wolfsburg	Transfer	Summer	30 June 2016	€400,000	
7	Midfield	Jan Rosenthal	27	Yes	SC Freiburg	End of contract	Summer	30 June 2016	Free	
9	Striker	Joselu	23	Yes	1899 Hoffenheim	Loan	Summer	30 June 2014	€1,000,000	
10	Striker	Václav Kadlec	21	Yes	Sparta Prague	Transfer	Summer	30 June 2017	€3,200,000	
17	Defender	Stephan Schröck	26	Yes	1899 Hoffenheim	Termination of contract	Summer	30 June 2016	Free	
18	Midfield	Johannes Flum	25	Yes	SC Freiburg	Transfer	Summer	30 June 2016	€2,200,000	
19	Midfield	Marvin Bakalorz	23	Yes	Borussia Dortmund II	Transfer	Summer	30 June 2015	€200,000	
25	Midfield	Tranquillo Barnetta	28	Yes	Schalke 04	Loan	Summer	30 June 2014	€300,000	
26	Midfielder	Tobias Weis	28	Yes	1899 Hoffenheim	Loan	Winter	30 June 2014	Undisclosed	
30	Goalkeeper	Felix Wiedwald	23	Yes	MSV Duisburg	End of contract	Summer	30 June 2015	Free	
39	Defender	Alexander Madlung	31	Yes	Free Agent	Free Agent	Winter	30 June 2015	Free	

==== Transferred out ====
No.	Pos.	Name	Age	EU	Moving to	Type	Transfer Window	Transfer fee	Sources
1	Goalkeeper	Oka Nikolov	39	Yes	Philadelphia Union	Termination of contract	Summer	Free	
2	Defender	Heiko Butscher	32	Yes	VfL Bochum	End of contract	Summer	Free	
4	Defender	Vadim Demidov	26	Yes	Anzhi Makhachkala	Termination of contract	Summer	Free	
5	Defender	Martin Amedick	30	Yes	SC Paderborn	Termination of contract	Summer	Free	
9	Striker	Olivier Occéan	32	No	1. FC Kaiserslautern	Loan	Summer	€500,000	
11	Striker	Srđan Lakić	30	No	1. FC Kaiserslautern	Loan end	Summer	Was previously loaned from VfL Wolfsburg	
19	Midfielder	Marvin Bakalorz	24	Yes	SC Paderborn	Loan	Winter	Undisclosed	
21	Midfielder	Karim Matmour	28	Yes	1. FC Kaiserslautern	End of contract	Summer	Free	
29	Midfielder	Rob Friend	32	No	LA Galaxy	Termination of contract	Winter	Free	
39	Defender	Julian Dudda	20	Yes	Werder Bremen II	Termination of contract	Summer	Free	
