= Mutaz =

Mutaz, Mu'taz, Motaz, Motez, or Moataz (Arabic: معتز) is a masculine given name and surname of Arabic origin. Notable people with the name include:

== Given name ==
=== Moataz ===
- Moataz Ben Amer (born 1981), Libyan footballer
- Moataz Al-Baqaawi (born 1998), Saudi footballer
- Moataz Bostami (born 1996), Jordanian footballer
- Moataz Eno (born 1983), Egyptian footballer
- Moataz Mahrous (born 1984), Egyptian footballer
- Moataz Matar (born 1974), Egyptian journalist
- Moataz Al-Mehdi (born 1990), Libyan footballer
- Moataz Mohamed (born 2005), Egyptian footballer
- Moataz Al-Musa (born 1987), Saudi footballer
- Moataz Nasr (born 1961), Egyptian painter, sculptor, multimedia artist, and cultural activist
- Moataz Salhani (born 1987), Syrian footballer
- Moataz Tombakti (born 1994), Saudi footballer
- Moataz Wadnan, Egyptian journalist
- Moataz Yaseen (born 1982), Jordanian footballer
- Moataz Zemzemi (born 1999), Tunisian footballer

=== Mootaz ===
- Mootaz Elnozahy (born 1962), Egyptian-American computer scientist
- Mootaz El Jounaidi (born 1986), Lebanese footballer

=== Motaz ===
- Motaz Azaiza (born 1999), Palestinian photojournalist
- Motaz Hawsawi (born 1992), Saudi Arabian footballer
- Motaz Malhees (born 1992), Palestinian actor
- Motaz Okasha (born 1990), Egyptian basketball player

=== Motazz ===
- Motazz Moussa (born 1967), Sudanese politician who was Prime Minister of Sudan from September 2018 until February 2019

=== Motez ===
- Motez (musician), Iraqi-Australian record producer, musician, installation artist and DJ
- Motez Nourani (born 2002), Tunisian footballer

=== Mutaz ===
- Al-Mu'tazz (847–869), the Abbasid caliph from 866 to 869
- Mutaz Abdulla (born 1974), Emirati footballer
- Mutaz Barsham (born 1991), Qatari track and field athlete
- Mutaz Ibrahim (born 1990), Libyan football referee
- Mutaz Kabair (born 1980), Sudanese footballer
- Mutaz Kailouni (born 1985), Syrian footballer

== Surname ==
- Abdallah ibn al-Mu'tazz (861–908), son of the caliph al-Mu'tazz and poet
- Hana Moataz (born 2000), Egyptian squash player
