= Giovani (footballer, born 2004) =

Brazilian footballer (born 2004)

Personal information
- Full name: Giovani Henrique Amorim da Silva
- Date of birth: 1 January 2004 (age 22)
- Place of birth: Itaquaquecetuba, Brazil
- Height: 1.84 m (6 ft 0 in)
- Position: Forward

Team information
- Current team: Al Sadd
- Number: 21

Youth career
- 2014–2022: Palmeiras

Senior career*
Years	Team	Apps	(Gls)
2021–2023	Palmeiras	31	(2)
2023–	Al Sadd	30	(8)
- * Club domestic league appearances and goals as of 17 January 2026

Giovani Henrique Amorim da Silva (born 1 January 2004), simply known as Giovani, is a Brazilian professional footballer who plays as a forward for Qatari club Al Sadd.

Giovani started his career at Palmeiras, making his debut in 2021. During his time at the club, he won several trophies, including the 2022 Campeonato Paulista. In 2023, he joined Al Sadd.

== Club career ==
Born in Itaquaquecetuba, São Paulo, Giovani joined Palmeiras' youth setup in 2014, aged ten. In September 2020, aged just 16, he was included in the main squad's 50-men list for the 2020 Copa Libertadores.

Giovani made his first team debut on 3 March 2021, coming on as a late substitute for Gustavo Scarpa in a 2–2 Campeonato Paulista away draw against Corinthians. On 1 June, he renewed his contract until 2024. Giovani made his Série A debut on 30 November 2021, starting and scoring his team's second in a 3–1 away win over Cuiabá.

On 27 June 2023, Giovani joined Qatar Stars League club Al Sadd on a five-year contract for a fee reported to be around €9 million. With just under a month at the club, Giovani suffered a significant setback, sustaining a torn cruciate ligament and cartilage injury during a recent friendly match against Raja CA of Morocco, with an estimated recovery time of 8 to 9 months before returning to the field." On 22 August 2024, Giovani scored his first goal for the club against Al-Arabi, scoring in the 60th minute.

== International career ==
On 28 April 2023, Giovani was called up to the Brazil national under-20 football team for the 2023 FIFA U-20 World Cup held in Argentina.

== Career statistics ==
As of match played 27 April 2025

Club	Season	League			State league (Note: Includes Campeonato Paulista)		National cup (Note: Includes Copa do Brasil, Qatar Cup)		Continental		Other		Total	
Club	Season	Division	Apps	Goals	Apps	Goals	Apps	Goals	Apps	Goals	Apps	Goals	Apps	Goals
Palmeiras	2021	Série A	3	1	10	0	0	0	1 (Note: Appearance in Copa Libertadores)	0	0	0	14	1
Palmeiras	2022	Série A	2	0	3	0	0	0	1	0	0	0	6	0
Palmeiras	2023	Série A	2	0	11	1	2	0	0	0	0	0	15	1
Palmeiras	Total		7	1	24	1	2	0	2	0	0	0	35	2
Al-Sadd	2024–25	Qatar Stars League	20	4	–		1	0	4 (Note: Appearances in AFC Champions League Elite)	0	0	0	25	4
Career total			27	5	24	1	3	0	6	0	0	0	60	6

== Honours ==
Palmeiras

- Copa Libertadores: 2021
- Recopa Sudamericana: 2022
- Série A: 2022
- Supercopa do Brasil: 2022
- Campeonato Paulista: 2022, 2023
