= Benjamin Pintol =

Bosnian footballer

Personal information
- Full name: Benjamin Pintol
- Date of birth: 19 May 1990 (age 36)
- Place of birth: Sarajevo, SFR Yugoslavia
- Height: 1.88 m (6 ft 2 in)
- Position: Forward

Youth career
- 1998–2000: Schwarz Weiß Griesheim
- 2000–2001: FSV Frankfurt
- 2001–2003: Eintracht Frankfurt
- 2003–2004: Mainz 05
- 2004–2005: Kickers Offenbach
- 2005–2009: FSV Frankfurt

Senior career*
Years	Team	Apps	(Gls)
2009–2011	FSV Frankfurt II	20	(4)
2009–2011	FSV Frankfurt	6	(0)
2012	Eintracht Trier	9	(2)
2012–2013	Eintracht Frankfurt II	26	(2)
2013–2016	Kickers Offenbach	81	(18)
2016–2018	Hallescher FC	46	(9)
2018–2019	Fortuna Köln	11	(0)
- * Club domestic league appearances and goals as of 11:30, 1 August 2019 (UTC)

Benjamin Pintol (born 19 May 1990) is a Bosnian professional footballer who most recently played for SC Fortuna Köln.
