= Joselu =

Spanish footballer (born 1990)

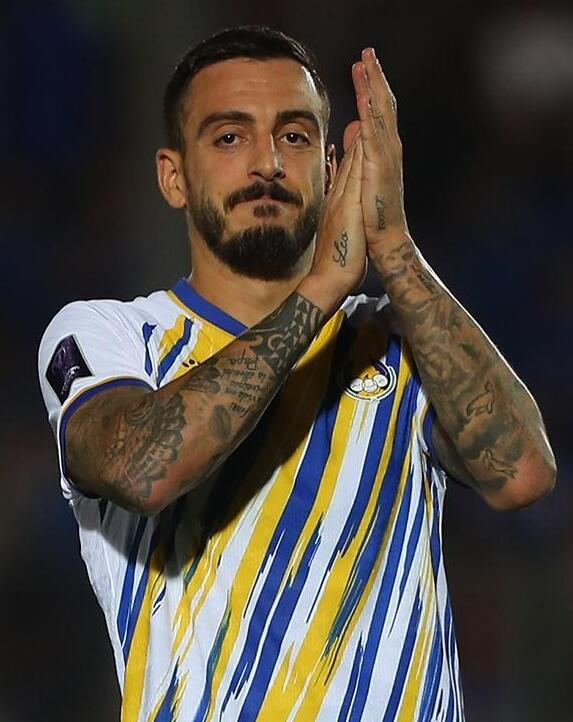
- Joselu with Al Gharafa in 2024

Personal information
- Full name: José Luis Mato Sanmartín
- Date of birth: 27 March 1990 (age 36)
- Place of birth: Stuttgart, West Germany
- Height: 1.92 m (6 ft 4 in)
- Position: Striker

Team information
- Current team: Al-Sailiya
- Number: 13

Youth career
- 2000–2002: SD Silleda
- 2002–2008: Celta

Senior career*
Years	Team	Apps	(Gls)
2008–2009	Celta B	21	(4)
2008–2009	Celta	2	(0)
2009–2012	Real Madrid B	67	(33)
2009–2010	→ Celta (loan)	24	(4)
2011–2012	Real Madrid	1	(1)
2012–2014	TSG Hoffenheim	25	(5)
2013–2014	→ Eintracht Frankfurt (loan)	24	(9)
2014–2015	Hannover 96	30	(8)
2015–2017	Stoke City	22	(4)
2016–2017	→ Deportivo La Coruña (loan)	20	(5)
2017–2019	Newcastle United	46	(6)
2019–2022	Alavés	110	(36)
2022–2024	Espanyol	34	(16)
2023–2024	→ Real Madrid (loan)	34	(10)
2024	Real Madrid	0	(0)
2024–2026	Al-Gharafa	33	(15)
2026–	Al-Sailiya	3	(1)

International career^{‡}
2008–2009	Spain U19	11	(3)
2009	Spain U20	1	(0)
2009–2010	Spain U21	4	(1)
2016	Galicia	1	(0)
2023–2024	Spain	17	(6)
Medal record
Men's football
Representing Spain
UEFA European Championship
Winner	2024 Germany	Team
UEFA Nations League
Winner	2023 Netherlands	Team
- * Club domestic league appearances and goals as of 30 October 2026 ‡ National team caps and goals as of 23:15, 15 October 2024 (UTC)

José Luis Mato Sanmartín (born 27 March 1990), known as Joselu, is a professional footballer who plays as a striker for Qatar Stars League club Al-Sailiya FC.

Joselu began his career with Celta Vigo, before being purchased by Real Madrid in the summer of 2009. He was a prolific goalscorer for their B-team, scoring 40 goals in 72 appearances, but was unable to break into the first team, and sold to Bundesliga side TSG Hoffenheim in August 2012. Following a loan spell at Eintracht Frankfurt, Joselu joined Hannover 96 in June 2014, and then Premier League side Stoke City a year later for a fee of £5.75 million. In 2017, he moved to Newcastle United for £5 million, where he spent two seasons, before signing for Alavés for an undisclosed fee. Joselu then played for Espanyol, before rejoining Real Madrid on loan for the 2023–24 season, where he won the UEFA Champions League.

Born in Germany, Joselu played for Spain at multiple youth levels, and made his debut for the senior national team in 2023. He was a member of the squad that won the 2022–23 UEFA Nations League and the UEFA Euro 2024.

== Early life ==
Joselu was born in Stuttgart, West Germany, and attended school in the country for four years, until the age of 10, before his family returned to Galicia, Spain.

== Club career ==
=== Celta ===
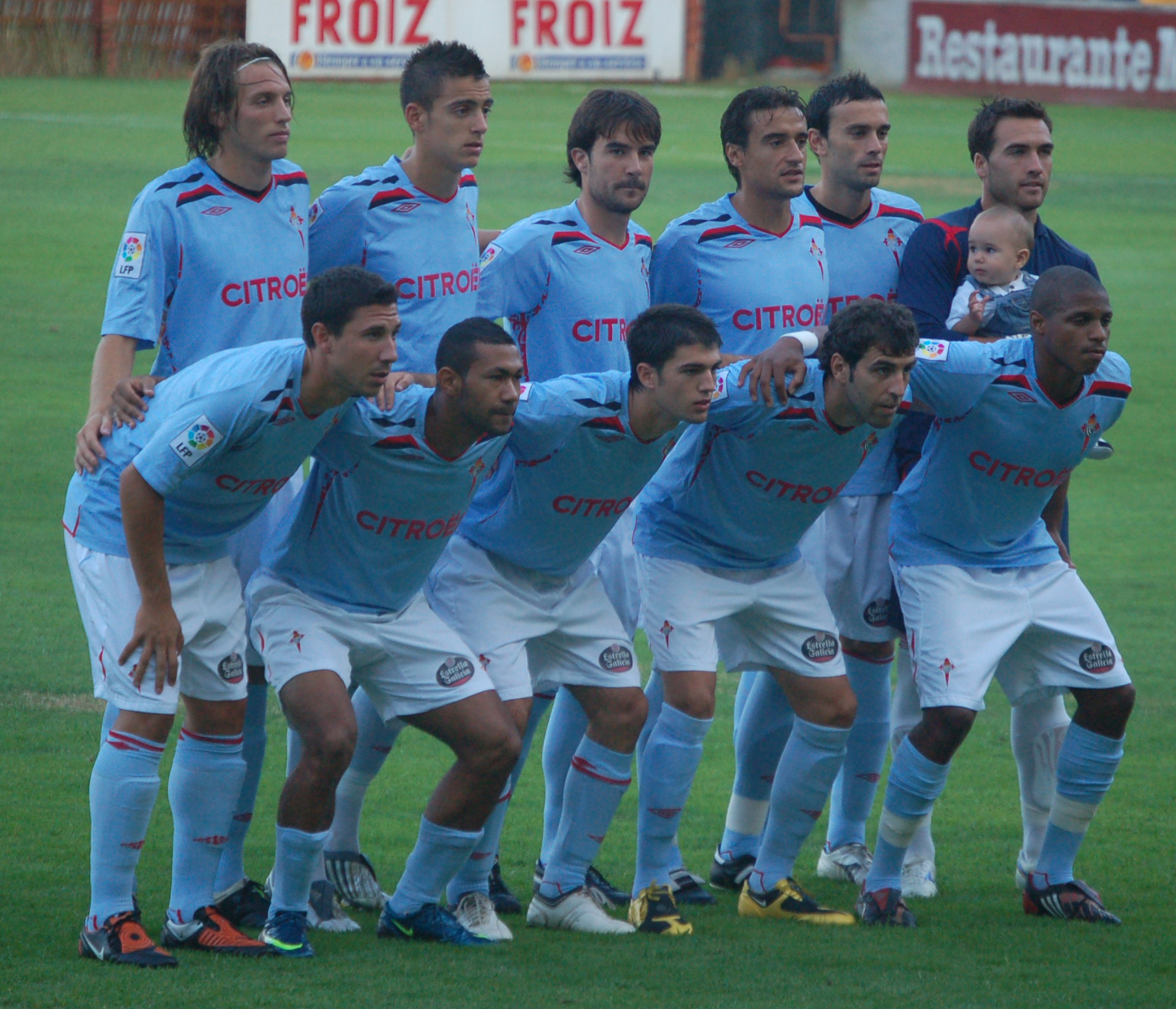
Joselu (top row, second from left) lined up with the teammates for Celta de Vigo in 2009

Joselu played his two first professional matches for local Celta Vigo in the second division, late in the 2008–09 season. Since the age of 18, at about the same time he made his debuts with the main squad, he played with the B-team in the third level.

In late summer 2009, Joselu was purchased by Real Madrid, being immediately loaned to his former team for a further campaign. He was relatively used during the division two campaign, but only scored four goals as the team finished in 12th position.

=== Real Madrid ===
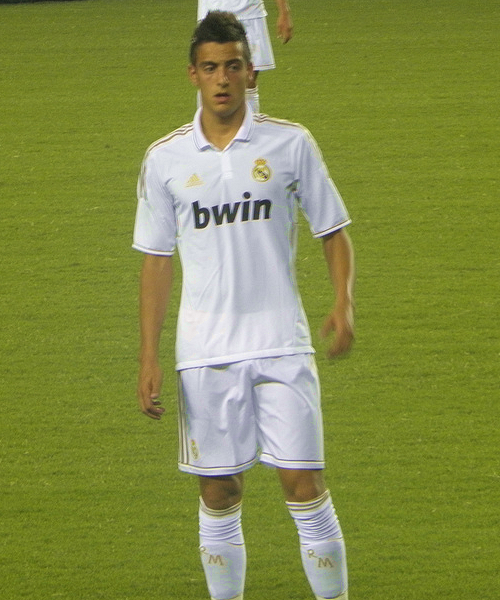
Joselu playing for Real Madrid in 2011

Joselu was Real Madrid Castilla's top scorer in the 2010–11 season, alongside Álvaro Morata, but the team failed to win promotion in the playoffs. On 21 May 2011, he made his first-team – and La Liga – debut, coming on as a substitute for Karim Benzema for the last ten minutes of a home fixture against Almería: he scored almost immediately from a Cristiano Ronaldo cross, making it 8–1 to the hosts.

On 20 December 2011, in his second official appearance for the main squad, Joselu replaced Benzema in the 77th minute of the home match against Ponferradina, for the season's Copa del Rey. He scored the goal to make the match 4–1 two minutes later, in an eventual 5–1 win.

In his second season with Castilla, Joselu became an essential offensive unit for manager Alberto Toril, and responded by netting 26 goals (19 in the regular season and seven in the playoffs) which made him the competition's top scorer, as his team were promoted to division two after five years, as champions. He subsequently attracted the attention of several European clubs.

Joselu said in 2015 that he did not regret his time at Real Madrid despite his limited first-team opportunities, due to his experiences training with its players and manager José Mourinho.

=== TSG Hoffenheim ===
On 8 August 2012, Joselu signed a four-year contract with TSG Hoffenheim for an undisclosed fee. He made his Bundesliga debut on 16 September, playing 30 minutes in a 3–5 away loss against SC Freiburg, and scored his first goal for his new club ten days later, contributing to a 3–0 success at VfB Stuttgart, and added a brace against SpVgg Greuther Fürth on 19 October 2012. He played 25 times for 1899 Hoffenheim, scoring five goals as they finished in 16th position.

==== Loan to Eintracht Frankfurt ====
At the end of his first season with Hoffenheim, Joselu admitted that he struggled to adapt to his new surroundings and was loaned out to Bundesliga rivals Eintracht Frankfurt for the 2013–14 season. He rediscovered his form under Frankfurt manager Armin Veh at the Commerzbank-Arena, scoring 14 goals in 33 appearances as the club finished in 13th position and reached the knockout stages of the UEFA Europa League.

=== Hannover 96 ===
On 9 June 2014, Joselu joined Hannover 96 on a four-year deal for a €5 million transfer fee. In his only season there he made 32 appearances, scoring 10 goals.

=== Stoke City ===
On 16 June 2015, Joselu joined English side Stoke City for a fee of £5.75 million, therefore fulfilling a lifelong ambition to play in England's top division. He made his Premier League debut on 15 August away to Tottenham Hotspur, as a 59th-minute substitute for Jonathan Walters; he won a penalty when fouled by Toby Alderweireld, converted by Marko Arnautović as Stoke came from 2–0 down to draw 2–2. On 28 December, after coming on in place of compatriot Bojan, Joselu scored his first goal for the Potters in a 4–3 win at Everton. He played 27 times for Stoke in 2015–16, scoring four goals as the team finished in ninth position. Towards the end of the campaign, Stoke manager Mark Hughes stated that Joselu had made a slow start to life in English football.

==== Loan to Deportivo La Coruña ====
On 31 August 2016, Joselu returned to Galicia to join Celta's rivals Deportivo La Coruña on a season-long loan deal. He scored his first goals for the team on 10 December, a two-minute brace as a substitute to give them the lead in an eventual 3–2 loss on his return to Real Madrid. Joselu scored six goals in 24 appearances for Deportivo before his season was ended due to an Achilles injury.

=== Newcastle United ===
On 16 August 2017, Joselu joined Premier League side Newcastle United on a three-year deal for a fee of £5 million. He made his debut four days later as a 52nd-minute substitute for Dwight Gayle in a 1–0 loss at Huddersfield Town, and scored his first goal for the club in a 3–0 home win over West Ham United on 26 August. Much like his fellow forwards, Joselu's form was inconsistent as Newcastle faltered in the league, but he was still top scorer by January when he scored in a 1–1 draw with Swansea City, although he also had his penalty saved by Nick Pope in a 1–1 draw with Burnley. He ended up finishing the season as third highest top scorer behind Gayle and Ayoze Pérez.

In the 2018–19 season, Joselu was fourth choice behind Pérez and new signings Salomón Rondón and Yoshinori Muto. The two league goals he scored all season both came in August in losses to Tottenham Hotspur and Chelsea. His final goal for the club came in a FA Cup third round replay victory over Blackburn Rovers on 15 January 2019, but by March, he was out of the squad altogether.

=== Alavés ===
On 15 July 2019, Joselu returned to La Liga to join Alavés on a three-year contract, for an undisclosed fee, reported to be around £2.5 million. On his debut on 18 August, he scored the only goal at home to Levante, while on 24 November he netted both goals in the last six minutes away to fellow Basque club Eibar. In 2020–21, he scored home and away against Real Madrid, including in a 2–1 win at the Santiago Bernabéu on 28 November for his club's first victory at that venue since May 2000.

In Joselu's final season at the Mendizorrotza Stadium before the end of his contract in 2022, he was the league's seventh highest scorer with 14 goals in 37 games.

=== Espanyol ===
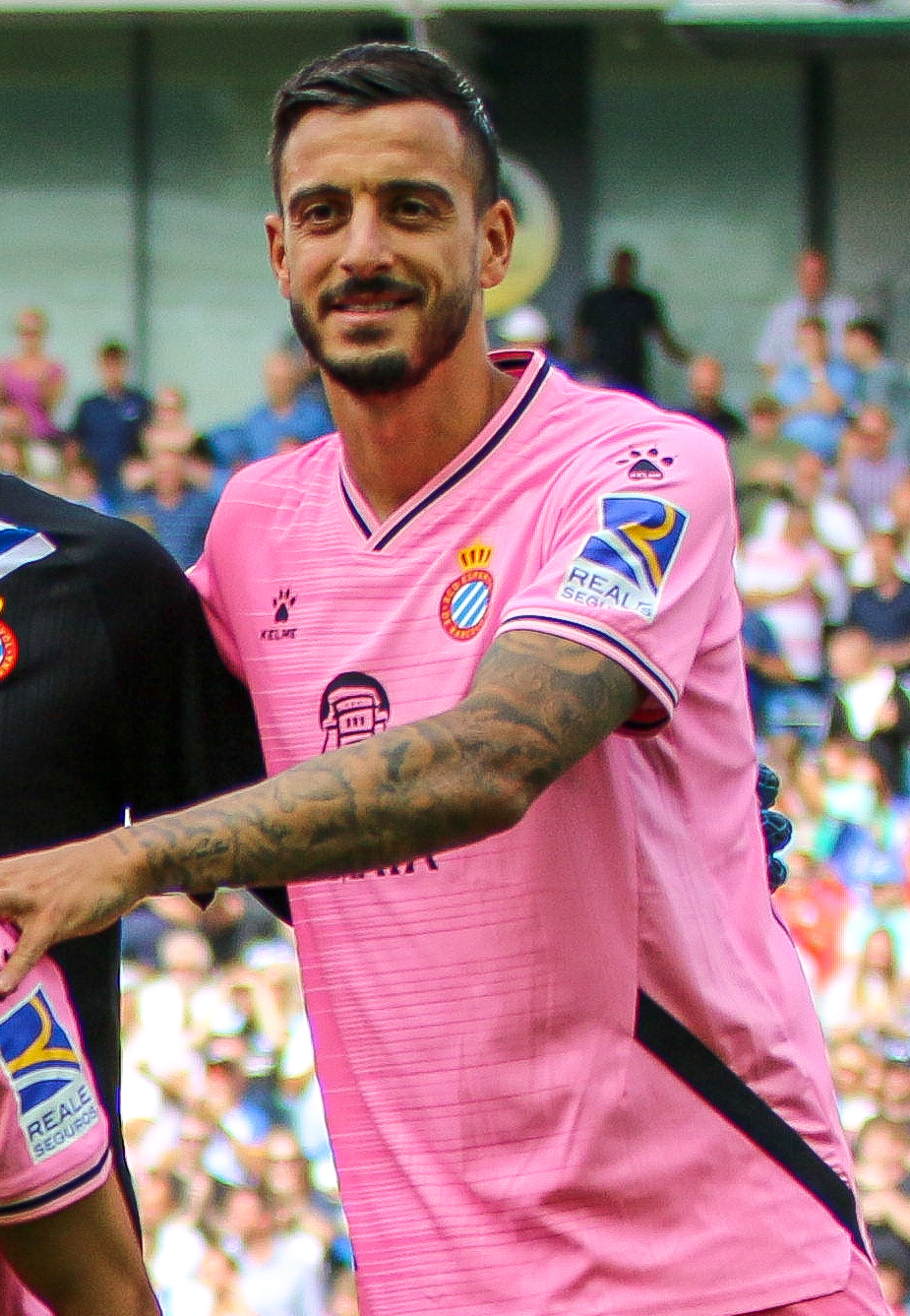
Joselu with Espanyol in 2022

On 27 June 2022, following Alavés relegation from La Liga, Joselu signed a three-year deal with Espanyol as a free agent. He made his debut for the club on 13 August against former club Celta where he scored from a penalty, after being awarded via VAR for a 2–2 draw. With 16 goals in 34 games for the relegated Catalans, he was La Liga's third highest scorer, behind Robert Lewandowski of Barcelona and Karim Benzema of Real Madrid.

==== Return to Real Madrid on loan ====
On 19 June 2023, Real Madrid announced the return of Joselu on a loan deal until 30 June 2024, with an option to buy at the end of the season. On 12 August 2023, he made his first appearance after the return coming on at the 80th minute in a 2–0 win against Athletic Bilbao in the league. On 2 September 2023, Joselu scored his first goal of the season against Getafe in a 2–1 win.

On 20 September 2023, Joselu made his first UEFA Champions League appearance in a group stage match against Union Berlin. On 29 November, he scored his first Champions League goal, securing a 4–2 win against Napoli. On 12 December, he scored a brace in a 3–2 away win over Union Berlin, in which Real Madrid finished top of their Group C with six wins out of six matches. On 14 January 2024, Joselu won his first club career trophy, as he participated in Madrid's 2024 Supercopa de España triumph, scoring the winning goal in the semi-final against Atlético Madrid and coming on as a substitute in the final versus Barcelona. On 8 May, Joselu scored two late and decisive goals for Real Madrid in a 2–1 victory against Bayern Munich in the Champions League semi-finals second leg to send them through to the final, which Real Madrid later ended up winning 2–0 against Borussia Dortmund at Wembley Stadium in London. After the season, Madrid picked up the option to sign him permanently for the price of 1.5 million euros.

=== Al-Gharafa ===
On 28 June 2024, it was announced that Joselu had joined Qatar Stars League side Al Gharafa from Real Madrid on a two-year deal, exactly one day after the Spanish club signed the player.

Joselu made his debut for Gharafa against Al-Khor on 9 August 2024. He scored his first goal for the club against Qatar SC in the 72nd minute.

Joselu was instrumental in Gharafa's success helping them reach a third-place finish in the Qatar Stars League and scoring 15 goals in 30 matches. He also contributed in winning the 2025 Emir Cup. In the final, Joselu scored a spectacular header which doubled his side’s advantage in the 18th minute, leaping to power in a precise header from a loose ball, enabling Al-Gharafa to win over Al-Rayyan.

=== Al-Sailiya ===
On 6 October 2026, Joselu joined Qatar Stars League side Al-Sailiya FC on a free transfer.

== International career ==
Joselu represented Spain at under-19, under-20 and under-21 level, but never received a call-up to the senior squad until he was nearly 33. He was also capped for Galicia in 2016.

On 17 March 2023, Joselu received his first call-up to the Spain national team for the UEFA Euro 2024 qualifying matches against Norway and Scotland. He came off the bench against Norway on 25 March, making him the oldest Spain debutant since 2006, and scored twice in two minutes to help Spain achieve a 3–0 win. On 15 June 2023, he scored the winner for Spain in the 88th minute, four minutes after being subbed on, in a 2–1 victory over Italy in the Nations League semi-finals.

In 2024, he was named to the squad for the UEFA Euro 2024. He helped Spain secure a record-breaking fourth European championship.

== Style of play ==
Joselu plays as a forward and has been described by his former manager Mark Hughes as a "technically adept forward...He's a good technical player, he's got good ability and I like his movement. His link-up play is very good and with the finishing we've done so far in training I've been very pleased. You can see technically he's very adept, getting his body in the right position to take chances".

== Personal life ==
Joselu is married to Melanie Cañizares, with whom he has two children. His wife is a twin sister to Daphne, wife of his former Real Madrid teammate, Dani Carvajal.

== Career statistics ==
=== Club ===
As of match played 18 March 2026

Appearances and goals by club, season and competition
Club	Season	League			National cup (Note: Includes Copa del Rey, DFB-Pokal, FA Cup, Emir of Qatar Cup)		League cup (Note: Includes EFL Cup)		Continental		Other		Total	
Club	Season	Division	Apps	Goals	Apps	Goals	Apps	Goals	Apps	Goals	Apps	Goals	Apps	Goals
Celta Vigo B	2008–09	Segunda División B	21	3	—		—		—		—		21	3
Celta Vigo	2008–09	Segunda División	2	0	0	0	—		—		—		2	0
Celta Vigo (loan)	2009–10	Segunda División	24	4	4	0	—		—		—		28	4
Celta Vigo (loan)	Total		26	4	4	0	—		—		—		30	4
Real Madrid B	2010–11	Segunda División B	34	14	—		—		—		2 (Note: Appearances in Segunda División B play-offs)	0	36	14
Real Madrid B	2011–12	Segunda División B	33	19	—		—		—		4	7	37	26
Real Madrid B	Total		67	33	—		—		—		6	7	73	40
Real Madrid	2010–11	La Liga	1	1	0	0	—		0	0	—		1	1
Real Madrid	2011–12	La Liga	0	0	1	1	—		0	0	—		1	1
Real Madrid	Total		1	1	1	1	—		0	0	—		2	2
TSG Hoffenheim	2012–13	Bundesliga	25	5	0	0	—		—		—		25	5
Eintracht Frankfurt (loan)	2013–14	Bundesliga	24	9	2	4	—		7 (Note: Appearances in UEFA Europa League)	1	—		33	14
Hannover 96	2014–15	Bundesliga	30	8	2	2	—		0	0	—		32	10
Stoke City	2015–16	Premier League	22	4	2	0	3	0	—		—		27	4
Deportivo La Coruña (loan)	2016–17	La Liga	20	5	4	1	—		—		—		24	6
Newcastle United	2017–18	Premier League	30	4	1	0	1	0	—		—		32	4
Newcastle United	2018–19	Premier League	16	2	3	1	1	0	—		—		20	3
Newcastle United	Total		46	6	4	1	2	0	—		—		52	7
Alavés	2019–20	La Liga	36	11	1	0	—		—		—		37	11
Alavés	2020–21	La Liga	37	11	1	0	—		—		—		38	11
Alavés	2021–22	La Liga	37	14	1	0	—		—		—		38	14
Alavés	Total		110	36	3	0	—		—		—		113	36
Espanyol	2022–23	La Liga	34	16	4	1	—		—		—		38	17
Real Madrid (loan)	2023–24	La Liga	34	10	2	2	—		11 (Note: Appearances in UEFA Champions League)	5	2 (Note: Appearances in Supercopa de España)	1	49	18
Al-Gharafa	2024–25	Qatar Stars League	21	10	4	4	0	0	9 (Note: Appearances in AFC Champions League Elite)	4	1 (Note: Appearance in Qatar Cup)	0	35	18
Al-Gharafa	2025–26	Qatar Stars League	16	6	0	0	0	0	6	3	0	0	22	9
Al-Gharafa	Total		37	16	4	4	0	0	15	7	1	0	57	27
Career total			497	156	32	16	5	0	33	13	9	8	576	193

=== International ===
As of match played 15 October 2024

Appearances and goals by national team and year
National team	Year	Apps	Goals
Spain
Spain	2023	9	5
Spain	2024	8	1
Total		17	6

As of match played 15 October 2024
Scores and results list Spain's goal tally first.

List of international goals scored by Joselu
No.	Date	Venue	Cap	Opponent	Score	Result	Competition
1	25 March 2023	La Rosaleda, Málaga, Spain	1	Norway	2–0	3–0	UEFA Euro 2024 qualifying
2	25 March 2023	La Rosaleda, Málaga, Spain	1	Norway	3–0	3–0	UEFA Euro 2024 qualifying
3	15 June 2023	De Grolsch Veste, Enschede, Netherlands	3	Italy	2–1	2–1	2023 UEFA Nations League Finals
4	12 September 2023	Nuevo Estadio de Los Cármenes, Granada, Spain	6	Cyprus	3–0	6–0	UEFA Euro 2024 qualifying
5	16 November 2023	Alphamega Stadium, Limassol, Cyprus	9	Cyprus	3–0	3–1	UEFA Euro 2024 qualifying
6	8 September 2024	Stade de Genève, Geneva, Switzerland	15	Switzerland	1–0	4–1	2024–25 UEFA Nations League A

== Honours ==
Real Madrid

- La Liga: 2023–24
- Supercopa de España: 2024
- UEFA Champions League: 2023–24

Al-Gharafa

- Emir of Qatar Cup: 2025, 2026

Spain

- UEFA European Championship: 2024
- UEFA Nations League: 2022–23

Individual

- Zarra Trophy: 2022–23
