= 2025 Amir of Qatar Cup =

Amir Cup 2025 (Qatar)
Tournament details
- Country: Qatar
- Dates: 21 April – 24 May 2025
- Teams: 20

Final positions
- Champions: Al-Gharafa (8th title)
- Runners-up: Al-Rayyan
- Champions League Elite: Al-Gharafa

Tournament statistics
- Matches played: 12
- Goals scored: 38 (3.17 per match)

The 2025 Emir of Qatar Cup (named Amir Cup since 2019) is the 53rd edition of the Qatari cup tournament in men's football. It is played by the first and second level divisions of the Qatari football league structure. Al Sadd are the defending champions. The winner qualified to the group stage of the 2025–26 AFC Champions League Elite.

== Preliminary Round ==
21 April 2024	Al Markhiya	1–2	Al Mesaimeer	Al Gharafa
19:00 AST (UTC+3)				Stadium: Thani bin Jassim Stadium

21 April 2024	Al Waab	0–1	Lusail	Al-Rayyan
19:00 AST (UTC+3)				Stadium: Grand Hamad Stadium

21 April 2024	Al Kharaitiyat	1–1 (a.e.t.) (3–2 p)	Al Bidda SC	Doha
19:00 AST (UTC+3)				Stadium: Thani bin Jassim Stadium

21 April 2024	Al-Sailiya	1–0 (a.e.t.)	Muaither	Doha
19:00 AST (UTC+3)				Stadium: Abdullah bin Khalifa Stadium

== Bracket ==
Round of 16
4 May – Doha (JBHS)
Al-Ahli (a.e.t.)	1
Qatar SC	0
4 May – Doha (ATS)
Al Shahaniya	2
Al Mesaimeer	0
5 May – Doha (ABKS)
Al-Rayyan	4
Lusail	2
5 May – Al Rayyan (KIS)
Al-Duhail	4
Al-Sailiya	2
6 May – Doha (JBHS)
Al-Gharafa	2
Al-Khor SC	1
6 May – Doha (ATS)
Al-Sadd	3
Al Kharaitiyat	1
7 May – Al Rayyan (KIS)
Al-Wakrah	1
Umm Salal	4
7 May – Doha (ABKS)
Al-Shamal	3
Al-Arabi	1

Quarter-finals
13 May – Doha (JBHS)
Al-Ahli (a.e.t.)	2
Al Shahaniya	1
14 May – Doha (JBHS)
Al-Rayyan (p)	2(5)
Al-Duhail	2(4)
14 May – Doha (ATS)
Al-Gharafa (p)	2(5)
Al-Sadd	2(4)
13 May – Doha (ABKS)
Umm Salal (p)	1(3)
Al-Shamal	1(2)

Semi-finals
18 May – Doha (ATS)
Al-Ahli	0
Al-Rayyan	3
19 May – Al Gharafa (TBJS)
Al-Gharafa	4
Umm Salal	2

Final
24 May – Al Rayyan (KIS)
Al-Rayyan	1
Al-Gharafa	2

=== Final ===
24 May 2025
19:00 AST (UTC+3)

Al-Gharafa	2–1	Al-Rayyan
Sassi 4'; Joselu 18'		Róger Guedes 49' (pen.)

Khalifa International Stadium, Al Rayyan
Attendance: 38,149
Referee: Mohammed Ahmed Al-Shammari
