= Abdullah Al-Yazidi =

Qatari footballer (born 2002)

Personal information
- Full name: Abdulla Badr Abdrab Abdulla Al-Yazidi
- Date of birth: 28 March 2002 (age 24)
- Place of birth: Qatar
- Height: 1.76 m (5 ft 9 in)
- Position: Right-back

Team information
- Current team: Al Sadd
- Number: 13

Youth career
- –2020: Al Sadd

Senior career*
Years	Team	Apps	(Gls)
2020–	Al Sadd	42	(0)

International career
2023–	Qatar	5	(0)
- * Club domestic league appearances and goals as of 17 January 2026

Abdullah Al-Yazidi (Arabic: عبدالله اليزيدي; born 28 March 2002) is a Qatari professional footballer who plays as a defender for Al Sadd in the Qatar Stars League. He has also represents the Qatar national football team.

== International career ==
In June 2023, he took part in the Maurice Revello Tournament in France with Qatar.
