= Moataz Bostami =

Jordanian footballer (born 1996)

Moataz Bostami معتز البسطامي
Personal information
- Full name: Moataz Majed Bostami
- Date of birth: 16 May 1996 (age 30)
- Place of birth: Jordan
- Position: Midfielder

Team information
- Current team: Al-Sailiya
- Number: 6

Youth career
- –2014: Qatar

Senior career*
Years	Team	Apps	(Gls)
2014–2026	Qatar	81	(2)
2018–2019	→ Al-Kharaitiyat (loan)	12	(0)
2024	→ Muaither (loan)	10	(0)
2026–	Al-Sailiya	1	(0)
- * Club domestic league appearances and goals

Moataz Bostami (Arabic:معتز البسطامي; born 16 May 1996) is a Jordanian footballer who plays as a midfielder for Al-Sailiya.

== Personal life ==
Moatasem is the Brother of the footballer Motasem Al Bustami.
